= Marthoma Church, Cheppad =

Church in Cheppad, India

Cheppad Mar Thoma Syrian Church is a Mar Thoma Syrian Church located at Cheppad, near Haripad in Alappuzha, Kerala, India. Over the course of its history, approximately 30 priests served the parish. The old church contains several features associated with the parish's history, including its altar, pulpit, bell, baptismal font, twelve pillars representing the twelve apostles, stained-glass windows and other architectural elements.

== History ==
The Cheppad Mar Thoma parish was established in 1894, under the leadership of the Rev. Koshy Mathai Kathanar of Kannampally. The land on which the present church stands was purchased from Chandy Thomas and his mother of the Pallithekkathil family. According to parish records, the family agreed to sell the property despite pressure and other offers, enabling the congregation to acquire the site.

In its early years, worship services were conducted in a temporary shed, which was later replaced by a more substantial structure. The foundation stone of the present church was laid in 1908 in the presence of Titus I Mar Thoma and Titus II Mar Thoma, the then suffragan. Although the foundation stone was laid in 1908, construction of the church began only in 1918.

The construction was affected by recurring financial difficulties and was interrupted on several occasions. Parish members contributed labour according to their ability, while those unable to participate personally arranged for others to work on their behalf at their own expense. Titus I supervised and directed the construction through parish authorities.

During one period when construction was halted because of a shortage of funds, the parish trustee Ittiyaveera of the Poonthuruthyil family, following the Metropolitan's instructions, pledged his own property to obtain the funds necessary to continue the work. The amount was subsequently repaid in instalments from the income of the church. Chummaru Varghese of the Purackal family and Kurian Kurian of the Manjade family played significant roles in obtaining the necessary permission for the construction.

Approximately ₹15,000 was spent on the construction of the church. During the construction period, Rev. P. V. Zacharia of the Purackal family, who was also a member of the parish, served as its vicar. In view of the parish's financial difficulties, he reportedly served for a period without receiving a salary.

The church was consecrated in 1938, by Titus II, assisted by Abraham Mar Thoma. The consecration marked an important event in the history of the parish. The first reception held by the congregation following the ordination of Rev. C. M. John as Juhanon Mar Thoma and Rev. C. T. Mathew as Mathews Mar Athanasius. was also conducted in connection with the consecration.

As part of the centenary observances of the parish, the madhbaha of the old church was renovated in 1993. The renovated madhbaha was consecrated on 22 January 1994 by Rev. Dr. Euyakim Mar Coorilos in the presence of Rev. Dr. Alexander Mar Thoma Metropolitan.
