= Mar Thoma Yuvajana Sakhyam =

Mar Thoma Yuvajana Sakhyam is the youth wing of the Malankara Mar Thoma Syrian Church (known as Mar Thoma Church); founded at the 1933 Maramon Convention, it has spread its wings to all the continents. It was established by a resolution of the Sabha Prathinidhi Mandalam. In its long history, it has produced many eminent personalities in the church and in the society.

It was in Kerala, in the 1st century CE, Thomas the Apostle arrived to preach the gospel to the Jewish community. Some of the Jews and locals became followers of Jesus of Nazareth. They were known as Nasrani people and their church was Malankara Church. They followed a unique Hebrew-Syriac Christian tradition which included several Jewish elements and Indian customs. Mar Thoma Church is part of this Malankara Church, still fully independent, without being part of any other Churches.

== Objectives ==
The Mar Thoma Yuvajana Sakhyam was organized with a view to help the youths of the Mar Thoma church to accept Jesus Christ as their Lord and Saviour; to train in worship and the fellowship of Christian life; to participate in the mission of the Church; to have faith in Christian values; to organize and conduct camps, meetings, discussions to increase the knowledge and experience of youth in the Holy Bible, church's faith and practice.

== History ==
As a programme of the centenary celebration of reformation in Malankara Church, Yuvajana Sakhyam was organized in 1933 by a resolution of the Sabha Prathinithi Mandalam (representative assembly of the Church). The first committee included Rev. V. P. Mammen as President; Rev. K. E. Oommen and Rev. C. M. John (later Dr. Juhanon Mar Thoma Metropolitan) as Vice Presidents; and Mr. V. E. Thomas (later Rev. V. E. Thomas, Singapore) as Secretary. The first meeting was held on 11 November 1933.

By 1937, there were 40 branches for the Sakhyam. 40 representatives attended the first general body meeting held on 26 February, that year.

In 1945, Mr. M. M. Thomas (later Dr. M. M. Thomas) was appointed as a full-time Organizing Secretary. Under his dynamic leadership the Sakhyam struck deep roots and spread its branches far and wide. (In 1966, Dr. M.M.Thomas was the delegate of the Mar Thoma church to the fourth assembly of the World Council of Churches. He was the chairman of the WCC Central Committee till 1975. Later he was appointed by the Government of India as the Governor of a state in India.)

By 2007, the organisation had over 1,000 around the world.

== Organization ==
Most of the Mar Thoma parishes have branches of the Sakhyam. A group of such a branches form a Center. There are a number of such centers under each Diocese. The constitution prescribes that the President should be a bishop of the Church.

Branches are set up with a four-fold program focusing on the pillars of worship, study, witness, and service.

The organisation is open to church members aged 13-35.

== Establishments ==
The Golden Jubilee Memorial building, main office building is at Tiruvalla was opened in 1986. It is close to the Mar Thoma Church office.

In connection with Silver Jubilee celebrations, a Youth Center was built in Adoor; it can accommodate about 200 young people to camp there and 1,000 people in the auditorium.

The Sakhyam has its own printing press to provide training and employment to the youth.

In 2006, another Mar Thoma Youth Center was inaugurated in Bangalore, Karnataka, South India.

== Publications ==
- From 1956, Sakhyam publishes a monthly magazine, Yuva Deepam in Malayalam.
- Ripples, English version of Yuva Deepam first published in 1994.
- In 2003 Jeeva Vani, the Kannada Quarterly publication commenced.

== See also ==
- Mar Thoma Church
- Titus II Mar Thoma
- XIII MAR THOMA YUVAJANA SAKHYAM NATIONAL CONFERENCE 2011
