= Mathews Athanasius (born 1907) =

Indian bishop (1907-1973)

Mathews Mar Athenasius Episcopa (18 February 1907 – 30 November 1973) was the first missionary bishop of the Malankara Mar Thoma Syrian Church. As a diocesan Episcopa he did pioneering work in organising parishes and new mission fields. His evangelical ardour and concern for the unreached area, made him forge ahead expansion programmes and colonisation schemes besides establishing of several institutions.

He was noted for his deep personal dedication to Jesus Christ and his zeal for the spread of the Gospel, continuity in the Evangelical tradition of the Malankara Mar Thoma Syrian Church. He was full of energy and sacrificial spirit.

== Early days ==
Mathews Mar Athenasius Episcopa was born on 18 February 1907 at Ayroor, in Kerala. He was the son of Thomas Kurudamannil, Ayroor. His mother was Aleyamma, sister of Titus II Mar Thoma Metropolitan, Palakunnathu, Maramon. Parents called him Mathaichen.

=== Education ===
Primary education was at Ayroor, Kozhencherry and at Kottayam. For higher studies he joined Kolkata (Calcutta) Bishops College high school and Saint Paul's College. In 1925 he was able to obtain a BA degree and in 1929 a BEd degree. In 1934, he proceeded to join Wycliffe College at the University of Toronto, Ontario, Canada.

== Keezhillam school ==
At the age of 21 he left home to go to the North Travancore which was an underdeveloped area. It had been selected as a mission field of the Evangelistic Association. In 1929 he and fellow workers started a school at Keezhillam as a means to reach out and help the people living in that area, with a group of fellow workers, having only their faith in God as their resource. They worked hard and opened the way for education for hundreds of children in poor families. In those days education wasn't free and many of the people couldn't afford schooling. By giving concessions in fees to such students, they were encouraged to study and the money for their education was taken from the meagre salary of the teachers who were gracious enough to accept it as a way of serving the Lord. Gradually education began to spread in those areas and people began to see the truth of the Gospel in the lives of their teachers.

== Perumbavoor School ==
Rev. C T Mathew (Mar Athanasius) moved to Perumbavoor seeing the need of that area. He was supported by a small group of friends including Rev.C.I. Abraham and Mr.A. Cherian (who later became a judge). A High School was opened and classes began on 1 June 1931. Here teachers worked on fellowship basis, on the pattern of the Union Christian College, Aluva and of Madras Christian College, Chennai. A group of dedicated teachers under the leadership of Rev. C T Mathew, the headmaster, became the nucleus of an Ashram. The school was known as the Ashram High School. The teachers shared everything in common and lived a life of fellowship as the first century Christians, devoting all their time to the welfare of the students. The boarding home and the school became highly reputed across the state.

== Ordination ==
Soon after opening the school at Keezhillam, he was ordained as a Semmasan (deacon) by Abraham Mar Thoma in 1929. While at Perumbavoor, in 1933 he was made a Kassessa (priest). Then while he was studying at Wycliffe College, Rev.C.T. Mathew was selected by the Prathinidhi Mandalam (Church Parliament) to be an episcopa of the church.

== Consecration ==
Rev.C.T. Mathew along with Rev.C.M. John were consecrated as Episcopas on 30 December 1937 at Tiruvalla, by Titus II Mar Thoma Metropolitan assisted by Abraham Mar Thoma Suffragan Metropolitan and Kuriakose Mar Koorilose of Malabar Independent Syrian Church. Rev. C.T. Mathew was given the episcopal title Mathews Mar Athenasius and Rev. C.M. John, Juhanon Mar Timotheous (later Juhanon Mar Thoma and Metropolitan.)

== As an episcopa ==
=== North Kerala area ===
His deep devotion and sacrificial life and the spirit of fellowship were the special characteristics of his service as Bishop. This spirit of adventure and trust in God made him a master builder of the Church. Wherever he saw the need, he ventured into action even when no resources were in sight. Undeveloped areas in Malabar became his concern as the Diocesan Bishop. He went to un-accessed areas and helped small congregation of people who had migrated from Central Travancore, seeking opportunity to make a living. They were helped to settle down and developed as on small communities in a spirit of co-operation. Nilambur and Chungathara and other places up to Gudalloor were all reached by him and the small congregations were encouraged and supported in various ways.

=== Travancore area ===
Later when he was in charge of the diocese in Central Travancore, he concentrated his efforts in developing the congregations among the new settlers in Chittar, Seethathodu, Angamoozhy and other places which were very difficult to reach in those days.

=== Outside Kerala ===
When the Evangelistic work of the Church expanded he was the first Missionary Bishop of the Church, travelling all over India, visiting the scattered congregations and encouraging the Ashrams. He was present in many international Evangelistic conferences in Tokyo and other places.

=== Other developments ===
He opened dispensaries, clinics and schools. The Olivet Aramana at Chengannur, the Retreat Centre at Maramon and the Kalalayam at Ayroor came into being as a result of his initiative. It was owing to his farsight that the Charal Mount which has since become a favourite camp sight was bought and made available for the church.

== Last days ==
Even though suffering from diabetes for many years, nothing could stop him from all out endeavour in the cause of the spread of the Gospel. After a short period, he succumbed to his illness and died on 30 November 1973 at the age of 73. He was buried in the Bishops' cemetery in the SCS Compound, Tiruvalla.

== See also ==
- Mar Thoma Church
- Syrian Malabar Nasrani
- Saint Thomas Christians
- List of Syrian Malabar Nasranis

== Bibliography ==
English

  1. Juhanon Marthoma Metropolitan, The Most Rev. Dr. (1952). Christianity in India and a Brief History of the Marthoma Syrian Church.. Pub: K.M. Cherian.
  2. Zac Varghese Dr. & Mathew A. Kallumpram. (2003). Glimpses of Mar Thoma Church History. London, England. ISBN 8190085441

Malayalam.

  1. Eapen, Prof. Dr. K.V. (2001). Malankara Marthoma Suryani Sabha Charitram. (History of Malankara Marthoma Syrian Church). Pub: Kallettu, Muttambalam, Kottayam.
  2. Mathew, N.M. Malankara Marthoma Sabha Charitram, (History of the Marthoma Church), Volume 1.(2006), Volume II (2007). Volume III (2008) Pub. E.J. Institute, Thiruvalla
