= Titus II Mar Thoma =

Indian bishop (1866–1944)

His Beatitude The Most Reverend Aboon Titus II Mar Thoma XVI Mar Thoma Metropolitan
- of the Apostolic Throne of St Thomas
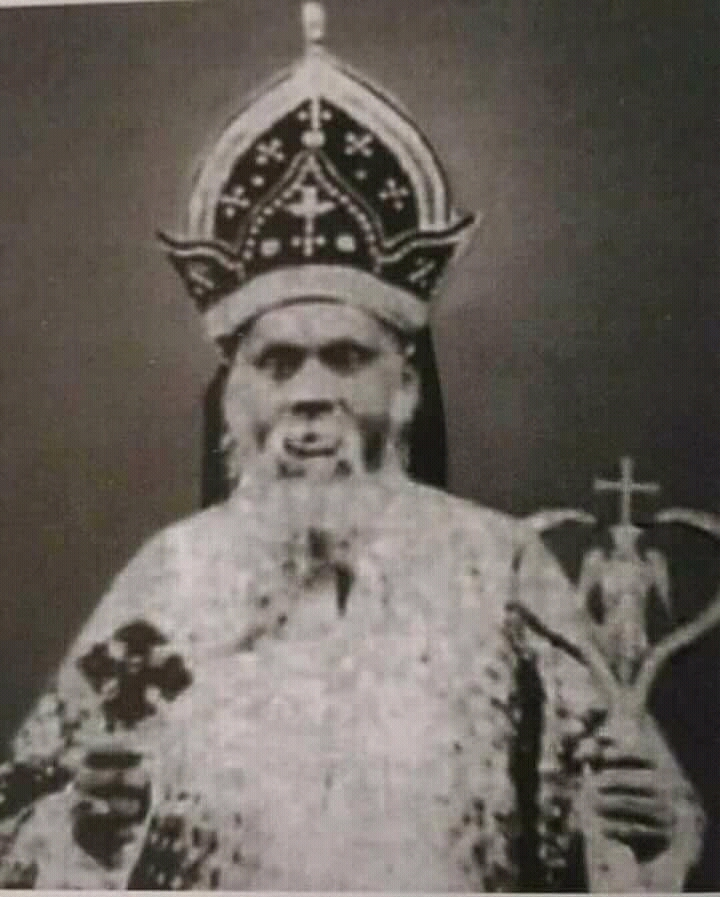
- Titus II Mar Thoma in 1914
- Church: Mar Thoma Syrian Church
- Installed: 5 November 1909
- Term ended: 6 July 1944
- Predecessor: Titus I Mar Thoma
- Successor: Abraham Mar Thoma

Orders
- Ordination: 1889
- Consecration: 9 December 1894
- Rank: Mar Thoma Metropolitan (Ecclesiastical Title of the Head of the Ancient Indian Church)

Personal details
- Born: P. J. Dethos; 6 May 1866 Maramon
- Died: 6 July 1944 (aged 78) Tiruvalla
- Buried: Tiruvalla

Titus II Mar Thoma XVI (born P. J. Dethos; 6 May 1866 – 6 July 1944) was the Metropolitan of the Malankara Mar Thoma Syrian Church with its center in Kerala state in south-western India. He was known as Thithoos Dwitheeyan Mar Thoma Metropolitan among his people. (Thithoos is Aramaic and Malayalam) and served as the third Metropolitan of the Mar Thoma Church from 1909 to 1944.

He was the nephew of Mathews Mar Athanasius Metropolitan and belonged to the Palakunnathu family of Maramon.

== Early life and education ==
P. J. Dethos (the Aramaic form of the name Titus) was born on 6 May 1866 as the youngest son of Maramon Palakunnathu Joseph (brother of Mathews Mar Athanasius Metropolitan) and Mavelikara Vadakkethalackal Mariamma.

After primary education at Maramon he joined Kottayam seminary. He was at C.M.S. High school, Kottayam and at St. Joseph's school, Trivandrum, before returning home to study Syriac.

=== Palakunnathu Family ===
In the 17th century, Kuruvilla a member of the Panamkuzhy family (a branch of the Pakalomattam family), came and settled in Kozhencherry on the banks of river Pampa. Later they moved to Maramon, and lived at Chackkalyil, on the other side of the river.

Mathen, the second son of Kuruvilla, moved to a nearby house at Palakunnathu. He had six sons and a daughter. The daughter was married to Mallapally Pavoothikunnel family and the first four sons moved to Themoottil, Neduvelil (Kozhenchery), Periyilel and Punamadom (Othera). The fifth son was a celibate hermit priest (Palakunnathu Thomas Malpan). As was the custom, the youngest son Mathew (grandfather of Dethos) lived at Palakunnathu family house, which still exists.

As members of the ancient Malankara Church, the Palakunnathu family produced several prominent ecclesiastical leaders. Notable figures from the family include his uncle Malankara Metropolitan Mathews Mar Athanasius and Marthoma Metropolitans such as Abraham Malpan's sons Thomas Mar Athanasius and Titus I Mar Thoma, and other relatives such as Joseph Mar Thoma.

== Ordination ==
Dethos was ordained by Thomas Mar Athanasius Metropolitan in 1889 and was appointed as assistant vicar in his home parish at Maramon church.

He was elected as a member of the Managing Committee (now known as Sabha Council) and a Representative Assembly (now known as Prathinidhi Mandalam) of the church. During this period he took active participation in the consecration of Titus I Mar Thoma.

== Consecration ==
Malankara Throne

In 1896, the Representative Assembly of the church decided to consecrate Rev. P. J. Dethos as the successor of Titus I Mar Thoma.

On 9 December 1896, he was consecrated by Titus I Mar Thoma with the assistance of Geevarghese Mar Koorilose V (of Karumamkuzhi Pulikkottil family) Metropolitan of the Malabar Independent Syrian Church with the Episcopal title Thithoos Dwitheeyan Mar Thoma Metropolitan (Titus II Mar Thoma). It was held in Puthencavu palli, one of the biggest churches in Kerala at that time.

=== Suffragan Metropolitan ===
He was given proper training and guidance by Titus I Mar Thoma. It was a period when the church was growing. This continued until the end of his life in 1944. For eleven years he was suffragan Metropolitan and was able to consecrate 33 new parishes.

=== Enthronement ===
Titus I Mar Thoma, died on 20 October 1909. The enthronement of Titus II Mar Thoma took place on 20 October 1909 at St. Mary's Orthodox Cathedral, Puthencavu.

== Administration ==
=== Infrastructural reforms ===
Several significant developments took place during the episcopate of Titus II Mar Thoma.

During this period, the reformist faction of the Malankara Church, which had previously been referred to as the Bava Kakshi, formally adopted the name Mar Thoma Syrian Church (commonly known as the Mar Thoma Church), reflecting its association with the apostolic tradition attributed to St. Thomas the Apostle.

In 1919, Poolatheen, the official residence of the Metropolitan, was constructed at Thiruvalla.

The Church had lost possession of many of its historic parish churches following the Seminary Case judgment of 1889. Consequently, numerous congregations conducted worship services in temporary structures for several years. During the tenure of Titus II Mar Thoma, efforts were undertaken to provide permanent church buildings for these parishes, leading to the construction of new places of worship across the Church.

Many parishes of the Mar Thoma Syrian Church were established through the initiative of lay members. Typically, after forming a worshipping community, the congregation would seek formal recognition from the Metropolitan, requesting approval for parish status and the appointment of a priest.

This pattern of expansion contributed to the growth of the Church beyond India. The first parish established outside the country was the Klang Parish in Malaysia, which was founded in 1936.

=== Finance ===
In 1937, the Mar Thoma Syrian Church adopted a policy whereby all church activities would be supported through voluntary contributions from its members. At the time, the decision was regarded as a significant departure from existing financial practices and was initially met with some skepticism. Nevertheless, it subsequently became an important development in the Church’s administration and financial stewardship, contributing to its institutional growth and self-sufficiency.

=== Organizations ===
A number of organizations were started during his tenure such as Mar Thoma Suvisesha Sevika Sanghom (1919), Mar Thoma Voluntary Evangelists' Association (1924), Mar Thoma Yuvajana Sakhyam (1933).

=== Schools & colleges ===
Some of the schools that were opened during his time: S.C. Seminary School, Tiruvalla (1902), Kozhencherry School (1904), Maramon School (1918, Kottayam Theological College (1923) Tiruvalla S.C. Training School (1925).

Union Christian College Aluva, one of the prominent educational institutions in Kerala state in South India was founded in 1921 as a joint effort of four churches in Kerala: Malankara Jacobite Syrian Church, Malankara Orthodox Syrian Church, Church of South India and Malankara Mar Thoma Syrian Church.

=== Successors ===
Even before Rev. M. N. Abraham of Maret family was ordained as a deacon in 1911, the leadership of the Mar Thoma Syrian Church had unanimously identified him as a future candidate for the episcopate. He was consecrated as a bishop on 27 December 1917 at Thiruvalla and received the episcopal title Abraham Mar Thoma, who later became the first Metropolitan of the Malankara Mar Thoma Syrian Church, who was not a member of the Palakunnathu family.

As the number of parishes continued to increase, the Representative Assembly (Mandalam) resolved to consecrate two additional bishops to assist in the administration of the Church. The assembly selected Rev. C. M. John of Ayroor Cherukara family and Rev. C. T. Mathew of Ayroor Kurudamannil family. They were consecrated as bishops on 30 December 1937 at Thiruvalla.

Upon consecration, Rev. C. M. John received the episcopal title Juhanon Mar Thoma, while Rev. C. T. Mathew was given the title Mathews Mar Athanasius.

Juhanon Mar Thoma later succeeded Abraham Mar Thoma as the Metropolitan of the Malankara Mar Thoma Syrian Church.

== Death ==
Titus II Metropolitan was a diabetic for a long time. By 1941 he lost his eyesight also. At this time, he was assisted by the other Metropolitans. On Thursday 6 July 1944, Titus II Metropolitan died. He was interred in the Bishops' cemetery in the SCS Compound, Tiruvalla.

== See also ==
- Malankara Mar Thoma Syrian Church
- Throne of St. Thomas
- List of Malankara metropolitans
- Syrian Malabar Nasrani
- Saint Thomas Christians
- Christianity in India
- Malankara Metropolitan
- List of Saint Thomas Christians
- Titus I Mar Thoma
- Abraham Mar Thoma

Mar Thoma Church Titles
Preceded by Titus I Mar Thoma	XVI Mar Thoma Metropolitan of the Malankara Mar Thoma Syrian Church; 1909–1944	Succeeded by Abraham Mar Thoma
