= Euyakim Coorilos =

Senior bishop of the Mar Thoma Syrian Church

The Right Reverend Doctor Euyakim Mar Coorilos
- Suffragan Metropolitan
- Church: Mar Thoma Syrian Church

Orders
- Ordination: 16 May 1978 (Priest)
- Consecration: 9 December 1989 (Episcopa)
- Rank: Suffragan Metropolitan (since 2021)

Personal details
- Born: Euyakim I. Cheeran; 25 November 1951 (age 74) Kunnamkulam, Travancore-Cochin, India
- Parents: Ittimani Ittyachan Kunju and Saramma
- Education: Sacred Heart College, Thevara, Christ College, Irinjalakuda, Mar Thoma Vaideeka Seminary

Euyakim Mar Coorilos (born Euyakim I. Cheeran; 25 November 1951) is an Indian religious leader who is Suffragan Metropolitan of the Mar Thoma Syrian Church. He was consecrated as a bishop in 1989 and was elevated to the rank of Suffragan Metropolitan in July 2021.

== Early life and education ==
Euyakim I. Cheeran was born on 25 November 1951 into the Cheeranveedu family in Arthat, Kunnamkulam, Kerala. He attended CMS LP School and Erumapetty Government High School for his early education.

He pursued higher studies at Sacred Heart College, Thevara, and earned both his B.Sc. and M.Sc. degrees from Christ College, Irinjalakuda. Following his secular studies, he entered the Mar Thoma Vaideeka Seminary in Kottayam for theological training.

== Ecclesiastical career ==
He was ordained as a Deacon (Semmas) on 29 April 1978 and was later ordained as a Priest (Kassissa) on 16 May 1978. During his ministry as a priest, he served several parishes including those in Mumbai, Palarivattom, and the United States.

On 4 November 1989, he was elevated to the rank of Ramban. He was consecrated as an Episcopa (Bishop) on 9 December 1989, assuming the title Euyakim Mar Coorilos. On 18 July 2021, he was formally installed as a Suffragan Metropolitan during a service presided over by Theodosius Mar Thoma Metropolitan.
