= Joseph Barnabas =

The Right Reverend Dr. Joseph Mar Barnabas
- Suffragan Metropolitan of the Malankara Mar Thoma Syrian Church
- Church: Malankara Mar Thoma Syrian Church
- Diocese: Ranni-Nilackal diocese

Orders
- Ordination: 12 June 1976
- Consecration: 2 October 1993

Personal details
- Born: Joseph Jacob; 8 September 1949 (age 77) Kottayam, Travancore (now Kerala), India
- Parents: E. V. Jacob and Saramma Jacob
- Education: CMS College, Kottayam; Bishop's College, Calcutta

Joseph Mar Barnabas (born 8 September 1949) is an Indian prelate and the current Suffragan Metropolitan of the Malankara Mar Thoma Syrian Church. He was consecrated as an Episcopa (bishop) in 1993 and elevated to the rank of Suffragan Metropolitan in 2021.

== Early life and education ==
Born as Joseph Jacob in the Ancherry Christos Parish near Kottayam, he was the son of E. V. Jacob and Saramma. He completed his primary and high school education in Erikad and Puthuppally. He earned his bachelor's degree from CMS College Kottayam and later pursued theological studies, obtaining a Bachelor of Divinity (BD) degree from Bishop's College, Calcutta.

== Ecclesiastical career ==
Joseph Jacob was ordained as a deacon (Semmas) on 29 May 1976 and as a priest (Kassissa) on 12 June 1976. He served as a vicar in various parishes, including those in Mumbai, Chennai, and Edmonton, Canada.

On 31 August 1993, he was ordained as a Ramban. He was consecrated as a bishop (Episcopa) on 2 October 1993 at the SCS Compound in Thiruvalla, taking the titular name Joseph Mar Barnabas. During his tenure as Episcopa, he led several dioceses, including Chengannur-Kozhenchery, Delhi-Mumbai, and Adoor-Malaysia.

On 18 July 2021, he was installed as a Suffragan Metropolitan, a senior rank within the Mar Thoma Church hierarchy.

== Contributions ==
Mar Barnabas has served as the Chairman of the Lectionary Committee and the Liturgical Commission of the Mar Thoma Church. He is noted for his work in sacred music, having published several liturgical song collections including Thybooso and Hasa Kramam. In 2022, he visited the Vatican, an event that contributed to the initiation of formal dialogue between the Mar Thoma Church and the Holy See.
