= Theodosius Mar Thoma =

22nd Metropolitan of the Malankara Mar Thoma Syrian Church

His Grace Theodosius Mar Thoma XXII
- Mar Thoma Metropolitan and Primate of the Apostolic See of St.Thomas
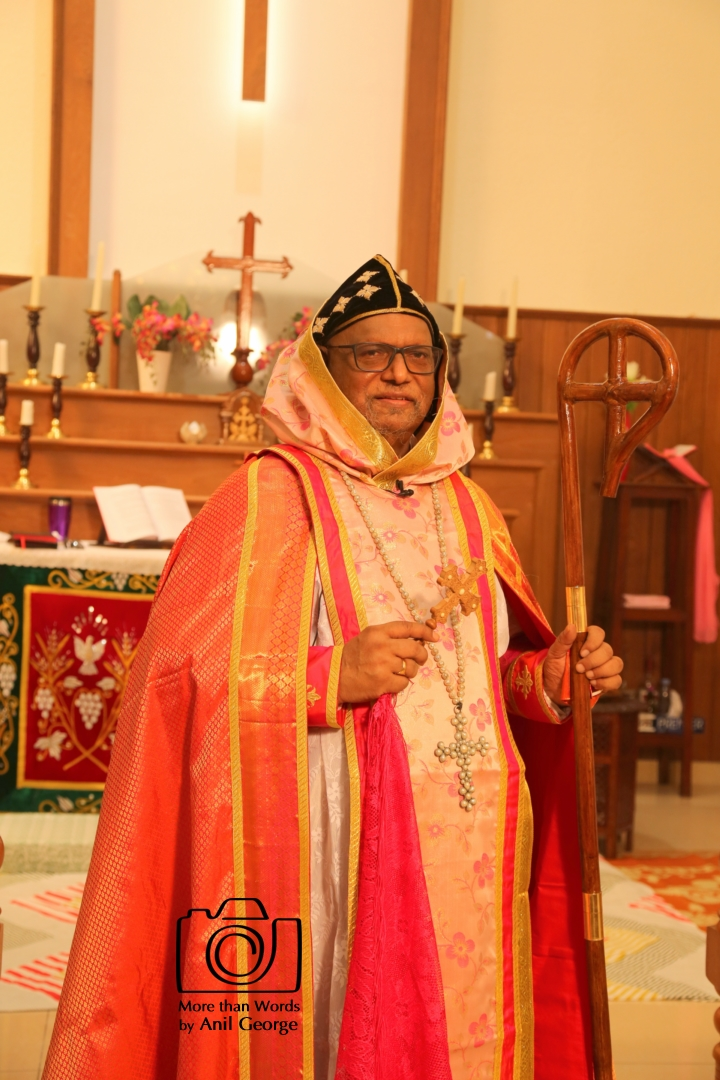
- Theodosius Mar Thoma XXII in 2021
- Church: Malankara Mar Thoma Syrian Church
- See: Apostolic See of St Thomas in India
- Installed: 14 November 2020
- Predecessor: Joseph Mar Thoma

Orders
- Ordination: 24 June 1972
- Consecration: 9 December 1989
- Rank: Mar Thoma Metropolitan (Ecclesiastical Title of the Head of the Ancient Indian Church)

Personal details
- Born: 19 February 1949 (age 77) Kollam, Dominion of India
- Residence: Poolatheen Aramana, Thiruvalla, Kerala, India
- Parents: Ashtamudi Kizhakkechakkalayil Dr. K J Chacko and Simoni (Mariamma)Chacko
- Education: Mahatma Gandhi University, Kerala; Serampore University; McMaster University

Theodosius Mar Thoma XXII Metropolitan (born 19 February 1949) is the Mar Thoma Metropolitan and the Primate of the Mar Thoma Syrian Church. Theodosius Mar Thoma presently occupies the Apostolic Throne of St Thomas and is also the first Mar Thoma Metropolitan to be born in post-independence India.

== Ordination ==
Theodosius studied at Baselius College, Kottayam (1966) and Mar Thoma College, Thiruvalla (1969). After taking a degree in Science, he joined Leonard Theological College and took BD Degree in 1972. His ordination as Kasseesa was on 24 February 1973. From 1979 to 1980, he studied Comparative Religions in Visva-Bharati University, Shantiniketan. He did his MA and Ph.D. from McMaster University, Hamilton, Canada from 1980 to 1986.

=== Episcopa ===
He was consecrated as Episcopa, Geevarghese Mar Theodosius, on 9 December 1989, along with Geevarghese Mar Athanasius and Euyakim Mar Coorilos Episcopa.

=== Suffragan metropolitan ===
On 12 July 2020, he was given the title Suffragan Metropolitan during the service at Poolatheen Chapel officiated by the Metropolitan The Joseph Mar Thoma in the presence of bishops, clergy, and laity of the church.

== Mar Thoma Metropolitanate ==
After the swearing-in of 1653, it became necessary to appoint a bishop. For this purpose, a special chair was made and Mar Thoma I the first bishop of Malankara Church was enthroned. This throne, used for the consecration of Mar Thoma I, is in the possession of the Mar Thoma Church and is kept at Tiruvalla. It has been used in the installation of every Mar Thoma metropolitan to this day so that the continuity of the throne of Mar Thoma is ensured. This was the throne used for the consecration of Mar Thoma XXII, Theodosius Mar Thoma.

It is said that after Thomas Mar Athanasius lost the case against the Orthodox Faction he had come back to the old seminary in Kottayam to vacate his room; some members of the church out of resentment had emptied everything inside and kept it outside the premises along with the Malankara Throne. By seeing the insignificance of a chair, they put out the chair to say isn't this the claim of your independent roots, take this degradable "Throne of Mar Thoma", Thomas Mar Athanasius had to then take that chair also which had by then broken a leg back to Maramon. The faction led by Thomas Mar Athanasius Metropolitan started to use the title of Mar Thoma Metropolitan.

=== Enthronement ===
On 14 November 2020, Thirumeni was installed as the 22nd Mar Thoma Metropolitan with the title Theodosius Mar Thoma Metropolitan. The installation service was held at Dr. Alexander Mar Thoma Valiya Metropolitan Smaraka Auditorium, Thiruvalla.

== Ordination dates ==
- Ordained as Deacon - 24 June 1972
- Ordained as Kassissa - 24 February 1973
- Ordained as Ramban - 11 April 1989
- Consecrated as Episcopa - 12 September 1989
- Installed as Suffragan Metropolitan - 12 July 2020
- Installed as Mar Thoma Metropolitan - 14 November 2020

== See also ==
- Throne of St. Thomas
- Syrian Malabar Nasrani
- Saint Thomas Christians
- Christianity in India
- List of Syrian Malabar Nasranis

Mar Thoma Church Titles
Preceded by Joseph Mar Thoma	XXII Mar Thoma Metropolitan of Marthoma Syrian Church; 14 November 2020–Present	Incumbent
