= Mar Thoma Syrian Church =

Oriental Reformed Indian Church

- Emblem of the Mar Thoma Church
- Abbreviation: MTSC
- Classification: Oriental Protestant; Syriac
- Orientation: Oriental Reformed
- Scripture: Bible
- Theology: Protestant theology
- Polity: Episcopal
- Mar Thoma Metropolitan: Theodosius Mar Thoma
- Region: India; parishes also in Australia, Canada, Germany, Middle East (Gulf Region), Ireland, Malaysia, New Zealand, Singapore, South Africa, United States, United Kingdom, Switzerland, Nigeria
- Language: Malayalam, English, Tamil, Kannada, Telugu, Hindi
- Liturgy: Reformed Liturgy of Saint James (West Syriac Rite)
- Headquarters: SCS Campus, Thiruvalla, Kerala, India (Metropolitan's residence: Poolatheen)
- Founder: Saint Thomas the Apostle (AD 52), through apostolic succession by sacred tradition; Abraham Malpan, leader of the Anglican inspired, 19th century reformation
- Separated from: Malankara Church
- Separations: St. Thomas Evangelical Church of India (1961)
- Number of followers: 1 million
- Ministers: Bishops: 12; Clergy: 1,184
- Missionaries: 700 (approx.)
- Places of worship: 1,246
- Hospitals: 12
- Nursing homes: 13
- Official website: marthoma.in
- Slogan: Lighted to Lighten

The Malankara Mar Thoma Syrian Church, commonly called the Mar Thoma Church, is an autonomous Oriental Protestant church based in Kerala, India. It combines Reformed Protestant theology with the episcopal and liturgical traditions of Syriac Christianity. Its principal liturgy is a reformed form of the Liturgy of Saint James in the West Syriac Rite, used in Malayalam and other languages. The church is headquartered at Thiruvalla and reports about one million followers, with dioceses in India and among communities overseas.

The church traces its heritage to the Saint Thomas Christians, whose tradition holds that their community originated with the mission of Thomas the Apostle to the Malabar Coast. After the divisions among the Saint Thomas Christians that followed Portuguese intervention and the Coonan Cross Oath of 1653, the branch from which the Mar Thoma Church developed adopted the West Syriac tradition. During the British period, contact with Anglican missionaries contributed to a 19th-century reform movement within the Malankara Church. Led especially by Abraham Malpan, the reformers revised the liturgy, rejected practices including the invocation of saints and prayers for the dead, and placed greater emphasis on the Bible and doctrines such as justification by faith. After the reformist bishops and their followers were excommunicated by the Syriac Orthodox patriarch in 1875, a decade of litigation ended with an 1889 judgment against their claim to the Malankara Metropolitanate and church property. The reformist faction continued independently as the Mar Thoma Syrian Church.

The church retains an episcopal ministry headed by the Mar Thoma Metropolitan, while its administration also includes elected parish, diocesan and central representative bodies. It is divided into fourteen dioceses, including dioceses serving North America, Europe, Africa, Southeast Asia, Australia and New Zealand. Its faith and worship preserve Eastern Christian forms while reflecting Reformed teaching; the church accepts the Bible and the Nicene Creed as the basis of its doctrine, emphasizes salvation by grace through faith and the priesthood of all believers, and does not seek the intercession of saints.

Ecumenism has been a prominent part of the church's modern life. The Mar Thoma Church is in full communion with the churches of the Anglican Communion and, since 2024, with the Old Catholic Churches of the Union of Utrecht. It also participates in the World Council of Churches and works in India with the Church of South India and Church of North India. Its missionary wing, the Mar Thoma Evangelistic Association, organizes the annual Maramon Convention, which the article describes as one of the largest Christian gatherings in Asia. The church also operates educational, theological and social-welfare institutions.

== Definitions ==
Malankara Mar Thoma Syrian Church is commonly called the Mar Thoma Church. In official and legal records the church is referred to as Mar Thoma Syrian Church of Malabar or as Malankara Mar Thoma Syrian Church. Malabar is a term used to denote the Kerala coast in earlier days. The original Church was referred to as the Church of Malabar by the Jesuits and as the Syrian Church of Malabar in Missionary Registers from 1801 onward. Malankara is an ancient name derived from the name 'Maliankara', Maliankara Island is on the Southwestern side of the Indian Peninsula. It is between Gokarnam and Kanyakumari the southernmost point of India. Kerala, the present southwestern state of India is only a part of Malankara. It is also thought to be a cognate of this name Maliankara, a place near Muziris, where Thomas the Apostle first landed in Kerala.

Mar Thoma is Aramaic, and means Saint Thomas. Members of the Mar Thoma Syrian Church are commonly called as Mar Thomiyar, Mar Thomites, or Mar Thoma Syrians. The original liturgical language used by Saint Thomas Christians was the East Syriac language which is a variant of Aramaic. The Reformation movement in the Malankara Syrian Church later resulted in the evolution of an independent indigenous Malankara church under the Mathoma Metropolitan, breaking all the ecclesiastical and temporal control from outside Malankara. In 1898, during the reign of Titus I Mar Thoma the church accepted as its name, Malankara Mar Thoma Syrian Church or Mar Thoma Syrian Church of Malabar to comprise its order and heritage. The members of this church are known as Mar Thoma Nasrani or Mar Thoma Syrian Nasrani.

== Administration ==
The Mar Thoma Syrian Church has a well-defined constitution and has a democratic pattern of administration. The central administrative setup consists of the Metropolitan, the Episcopal Synod (consisting of all the bishops of the church), the Prathinithi Mandalam (House of Representatives) and the Sabha Council (executive body of the house of representatives / Mandalam), and the Vaideeka Selection Committee (to select candidates for the ordained ministry of the church).

The central administration of the church is backed by the Dioceses. Each diocese has its own council and an assembly. The assembly members are elected by the individual parishes, and the diocesan council members are elected by the assembly.

All members of a parish are members of the Edavaka Sangham (General Body) and they also have the right to elect their representatives to the Diocesan Assembly and Prathinidhi Mandalam (Church Parliament).

The title of the head of the church is "Mar Thoma Metropolitan". He is ordained from among the duly-consecrated bishops (Episcopas) of the church, the choice being ordinarily that of the senior-most among them. The present Mar Thoma Metropolitan is Theodosius Mar Thoma who resides at Poolatheen at church Headquarters in Tiruvalla, Kerala. He is the 22nd Mar Thoma in the line that began with the re-establishment of the episcopacy after the Coonan Cross Oath (1653).

If the Metropolitan is personally satisfied that he has difficulty continuing to perform the duties pertaining to his office, he may relinquish the powers and responsibilities of Metropolitan. Then he becomes the Mar Thoma Metropolitan Emeritus and is addressed as "Mar Thoma Valiya Metropolitan". The most recent holder of the title was Philipose Mar Chrysostom, who died on 5 May 2021.

To assist the metropolitan there are Episcopas, the senior-most among them is called the Suffragan Metropolitan.

=== Administrative divisions ===
The church is divided into 14 dioceses (bhadrasanam; Malayalam: ഭദ്രാസനം), each headed by the Metropolitan, a Suffragan Metropolitan or an Episcopa. The United Kingdom–Europe–Africa diocese was separated from the former Diocese of North America and Europe in January 2024.

Dioceses and diocesan bishops (assignments effective 1 January 2024)
Diocese	Bishop	Centre	Location
Niranam–Maramon	Theodosius Mar Thoma (Metropolitan)	Poolatheen Aramana	Thiruvalla
Chengannur–Mavelikkara	Euyakim Mar Coorilos (Suffragan Metropolitan)	Olivet Aramana	Chengannur
Adoor	Mathews Mar Seraphim	Hermon Aramana	Adoor
Kottarakkara–Punalur	Thomas Mar Theethos	Oorshalem Aramana	Kottarakkara
Thiruvananthapuram–Kollam	Isaac Mar Philoxenos	Mar Thoma Kendram	Mannanthala, Thiruvananthapuram
Kottayam–Kochi	Thomas Mar Timotheos	Bethel Aramana	Manganam, Kottayam
Ranni–Nilackal	Joseph Mar Barnabas (Suffragan Metropolitan)	Mar Thoma Centre	Ranni
Kunnamkulam–Malabar	Mathews Mar Makarios	Mar Thoma Centre	Kozhikode
Chennai–Bangalore	Gregorios Mar Stephanos	Mar Thoma Bhavan	Chennai
Mumbai	Joseph Mar Ivanios	Mar Thoma Centre	Mumbai
Delhi	Zacharias Mar Aprem	Mar Thoma Centre	New Delhi
North America	Abraham Mar Paulos	Sinai Mar Thoma Center	Merrick, New York
United Kingdom–Europe–Africa	Joseph Mar Ivanios		
Malaysia–Singapore–Australia–New Zealand	Gregorios Mar Stephanos		

== Metropolitans and bishops ==
=== Present episcopal synod ===
The Episcopal Synod consists of the Metropolitan, two Suffragan Metropolitans and nine Episcopas. They are listed with their dioceses in the table under Administrative divisions.

=== Mar Thoma metropolitans ===
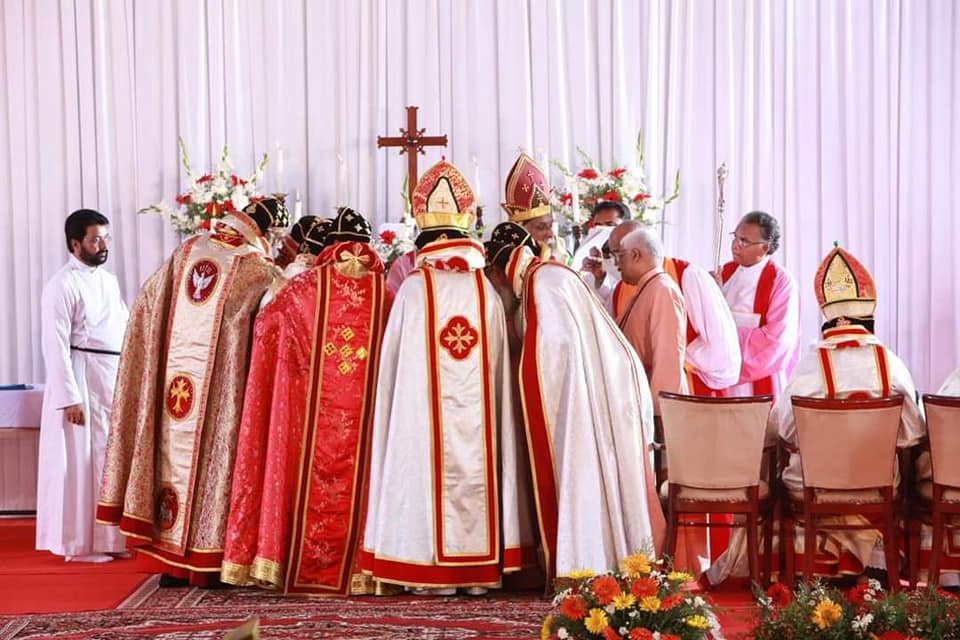
Presentation of crozier during Mar Thoma bishopric ordination by Joseph Mar Thoma, with the assistance of other Mar Thoma, as well as CSI bishops Thomas Samuel and KG Daniel as co-consecrators

The excommunication of Reformist bishops and their followers by the Syriac Orthodox Patriarch in 1875, the Synod of 1876 (Mulanthuruthy) and the Royal Court Verdict of 1889 were turning points in the history of the Malankara Syrian Church of Malabar. The Reformist (Metran) faction continued to consecrate bishops to the Malankara See without the consent of Patriarch as they claimed Malankara church is independent of the Syrian Church. Before the death of Malankara Metropolitan Mathews Athanasius, he consecrated Thomas Athanasius as Suffragan bishop of Malankara Church. Following the death of Mathews Athanasius, the suffragan succeeded as the Metropolitan of the Malankara See in 1877 which led to a schism in the Malankara church. Those who supported reformation loyally followed the Malankara Metropolitan who was legally evicted from the Malankara Syrian Church. He died in 1893 without consecrating a successor and suggesting a new name for the church. The Metropolitan of Malabar Independent Syrian Church stepped in and consecrated Titus Mar Thoma as the new bishop.

The Mar Thoma Syrian Church usually follow the traditional West Syriac episcopal consecration practice, by which only the presiding bishop or Mar Thoma Metropolitan lays hands on the bishop-elect. Participation as co-consecrators is effectuated while bestowing the pastoral staff. For that, the bishops of the Malabar Independent Syrian Church, Church of South India and Tamil Evangelical Lutheran Church have historically joined the Mar Thoma Metropolitan.

=== Clergy ===
Semmasan (deacons): The Sabha Prathinidhi Mandalam elects a Vaidika Selection board to select candidates for the ordained ministry of the church through recommendations (letters from bishops-clergy by the level of exposure in church or by personal sponsorships of bishops or written support pledged from bishops), exams (English, General knowledge and Bible) and pre- and post- theological training interviews (with theological-sociological aspects and scrutiny through psychological and health evaluations).

Following a Malankara Church tradition and from diasporic influence, the church follows a compulsory twelve-month (or 24 months with relocation, if failed in the first attempt) unpaid missionary service to those who are inclined to be a priest, before selection process as a "Tithe of Youth" program for "evaluation purposes". Additionally, this program was challenged in youth meets of the church at the time of its conception on the basis of non-guarantee in an entry, fast-changing world, career stagnation, and other economic factors and have arrived at a discussion level resolution of implementing this process after the pursual of their theological training and integrating the "Deacon" status during the time period under mentorship which enables the church to fill up NGO's, projects and mission fields with trained and theologically equipped individuals for staff duties and pastoring, thus avoid stress and negligence that would be otherwise imparted on the youth. During the intensive field training, when the inclined candidate is counted to be worthy for the controlled influx in church duties, the trained and experienced Deacons can be nominated for ordinations as Kassessas, by each diocese as the allotment.

Kassessa (clergy priests): Persons receiving ordination as ministers shall be duly ordained deacons. They all have had their Bachelor of Divinity degree from the Mar Thoma Theological Seminary, Kottayam, Kerala, or from other recognized theological seminaries of India. The wife of a Kassissa is known as "Baskiamma" derived from" Baskiyomo in Syriac.

Vicars general: From among the clergy who have completed 25 years of service in the ordained ministry and not less than sixty years of age are selected according to their contributions and ordained as vicars general. In the absence of the diocesan bishop, they may be appointed as deputy head of the bishopric.

== History ==
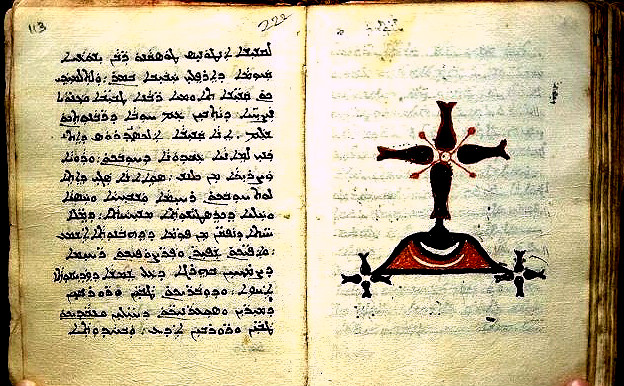
East Syriac Rite Liturgy of Addai and Mari

Thomas Christians are popularly and traditionally called as Syrian Christians, in view of the Syriac liturgy (a variant of the classical form of Aramaic) used in church services since the early days of Christianity in India.

The Saint Thomas Christians remained as the Church of Malabar with fraternity relationship with Church of East, Church of Antioch, Church of Alexandria, etc. till the Advent of Portuguese and Jesuits of Roman Catholic church in the 15th century. Thereafter, the Christians of St Thomas had been influenced by multiple belief streams at different points of time. These influences have later resulted in serious rifts and in the breaking down of the monolithic apostolic church to different fragments under different faith streams. They were organised as a church in the 8th century, served by foreign bishops, and with a hereditary local chief called Archdeacon (Arkadiyokon). In the 16th century the overtures of the Portuguese padroado to bring the Saint Thomas Christians into the Latin Church of the Catholic Church led to the first of several rifts in the community and the establishment of Pazhayakoor (Catholic) and Puthenkoor factions. Since that time further splits have occurred, and the Saint Thomas Christians are now divided into several denominations, each with their own liturgies and traditions.

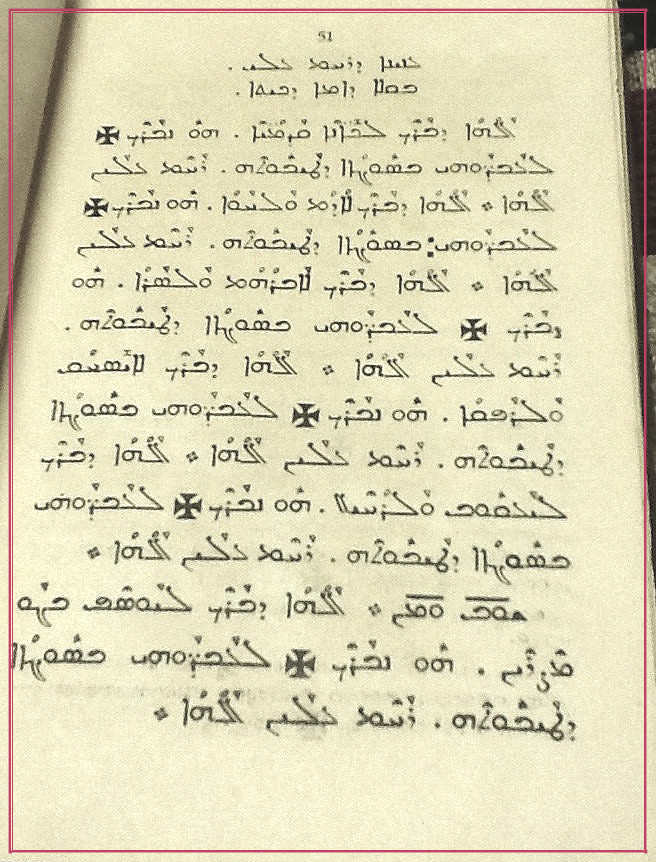
West Syriac Rite Liturgy of St James

=== First century BC ===
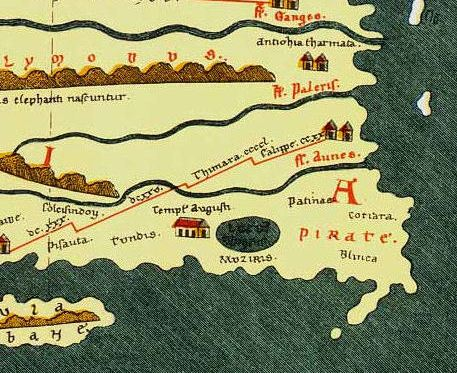
Muziris, near the tip of India, in the Peutinger Table

On the southwestern side of the Indian peninsula; between the mountains and the Erythraean Sea (now the Arabian Sea); stretching from Kannur to Kanyakumari was the land called Cherarajyam, which was ruled by local chieftains. Later this land came to be known as the Malabar region and (now Kerala). Muziris (near Kochi) was the important entry port. After the discovery of Hippalus, every year 100 ships arrived here from various parts of the then known world, including Red Sea ports.

According to the Bible, during the time of Moses and Solomon, the Malabar Coast traded spices and luxury articles with Israel (I Kings 9:26–28, 10:11, 22; 2 Chronicles 8:18, 9:21).

Excavations carried out at Pattanam (near Kochi) from 2005 provided evidence that the maritime trade between Kerala and the Mediterranean ports existed even before 500 BC or earlier. It is possible that some of those traders who arrived from the west, including Jews, remained in Kerala.

While Augustus (31 BC- 14 AD) was the Roman emperor and Herod the Great (37–4 BC) was King of Judea, ambassadors from Malabar visited the Emperor according to an account of Nicolaus of Damascus. Certain nasrani writings hypothesize that these ambassadors were the Biblical Magi of Matthew 2:1, as a tradition.

=== First 15 centuries ===
==== Arrival of Saint Thomas ====
Saint Thomas Christians believe that Thomas the Apostle arrived in the Malabar Coast around AD 52. He landed at Muziris (now estimated as Pattanam, near Kochi on the Malabar Coast), after his first mission in the Parthian empire, during the era of King Gondophares. It is believed that St. Thomas itinerated for 30 years in Kerala and proceeded to the east coast of India from Malankara and died a martyrs' death at a place called Mylapore-Chinnamalai in Tamil Nadu.

The Nazarenes in Malabar were either proselytized from mainstream Judaism by 'Mar Thomas' or 'Mar Bartholomeu'. Pantaneius's reference to the gift of 'Gospel of Matthew in Hebrew' by Bartholomeu to the Nazereans in Malabar is a clear pointer to the fact that Mar Thomas did evangelize Malabar, It could be further stated that either Mar Nathanael (John 21:2) aided in Mar Thomas' mission in India for a brief time before heading to Armenia or bar-Tau'ma, Son of Thomas assisted in his father's missionary activities per norms in Leviticus 21:7: this could also explain why most of the priests in the order of St. Thomas were later allowed to be married, which led to the prerogative of sacerdotalism to certain groups/families and to people supported by them.

==== First Christians ====
In early Christian times, 'Nazranis' was not a separate religion, but a sect in the Jewish community. The term was used to denote followers of Jesus of Nazareth. (Acts. 24:5; 28:22). 'Khristianos' (or Christians) was initially used largely to refer non-Jewish people who followed Christ (Acts 11:26). In Kerala, the sect was known as 'Nazraani Margam'. Margam in Malayalam means, 'The Way'. (Acts 9:2; 19:9, 23; 22:4; 24:22). Thus, the word Nazraani shows that some who joined them were Jews. But in Kerala, this name was replaced by the word 'Christians' in the 20th century.

The earliest families within the Jewish community to accept the path of Christianity through St. Thomas, later intermarried with the ethnic local community and Brahmins of the 6th century. This led to the upbringing of marginal class or 'sambandham' Brahminic family clans like Pakalomattom, Sankarapuri and Kalli to a different socioeconomic status, they are now widely accepted as the first families who adopted an emigre way of life or 'Christianity' in Kerala. According to recent DNA research by Dr. Mini Kariappa, a significant number of Knanaya's share their ancestral roots with the West Eurasian gene pool of Jews.

==== Administration ====
Saint Thomas Christians were administratively under the single native dynastic leadership of Arkadyaqon (East Syrian term for an ecclesiastical head with extensive administrative powers, deriving from Greek αρχιδιάκονος = archdeacon) commonly referred as "Jathikku Karthavyan" ( Malayalam term meaning "Leader of The Community"). The Malankara Church believes that St. Thomas appointed elders at every place he preached to lead the believers. He prayed and laid his hands upon them, in the same way as the other disciples did (Book of Acts 6:1–6; 8:14–17; 13: 1–3). This was the system used until the arrival of Portuguese. By 1500, Malankara Church had Parish elders and a church leader. Before the arrival of Portuguese, Latin was unknown to Malankara people. In the Decrees of The Synod of Udayamperoor presented to the St. Thomas Christians in their mother tongue Malayalam, Malankara Mooppen was the name used to refer the Church leader, except on three occasions. During the period of Colonialism, (i.e., from the 16th century), the Portuguese Jesuits began deliberate attempts to annex the community into the Latin Church of the Catholic Church, and in 1599 AD, they succeeded in their attempt through the infamous Synod of Diamper. Resentment against these forceful measures led the majority of the community under their Arkadyaqon Thomas to swear an oath never to submit to the Portuguese, known as the Coonan Cross Oath in 1653. For the first time in 1653, the church leader was given the title Mar Thoma when Thomas Arkadyaqon was consecrated as Mar Thoma I. The present head of the Mar Thoma Church is the twenty-second Mar Thoma.

==== Pantaenus from Alexandria ====
In the 2nd century (189-190 AD) AD, Pantaenus, the Philosopher and Missionary sent by Bishop Demetrius of Alexandria to India, found that there were a number of Christians in India with a Persian Bishop and that they had a copy of the Gospel according to Matthew in Aramaic. These Christians were the early evangelists of Malankara Church.

==== Arrival of Knanaya Nazranis ====
During the time of King Shapur II (310–379) of Persia, a group of 400 immigrants (72 families) from Persia arrived in Malabar under the leadership of merchant Knai Thomman. They were engaged in trade and settled down in Kodungallur. Another immigration from Persia occurred around 825 under the leadership of Persian merchant Marwan Sabriso, with two Bishops, Sapro and Prodh. Together they were known as Knanaya/Kanai people. They continued to remain partially in an endogamous group within the Nasrani community. They cooperated with the Malankara Church, attended worship services together but remained a separate identity. By the 10th century, in Malabar there were two Nazrani groups, the Saint Thomas Christians and Knanaya community.

==== Bishops from Persia ====
Following the arrival of Christians from Persia, their bishops, priests or laymen began visiting them. Most of them were not able to return due to financial difficulties and travelling long distances. The Knanaya people were worshipping together with the St. Thomas Christians. So these visitors also attended these services. It was a matter of ongoing dispute between different churches in Kerala whether the Syrian bishops had any administrative responsibility or jurisdiction over the St. Thomas Nazrani Christians.

==== Persian crosses ====
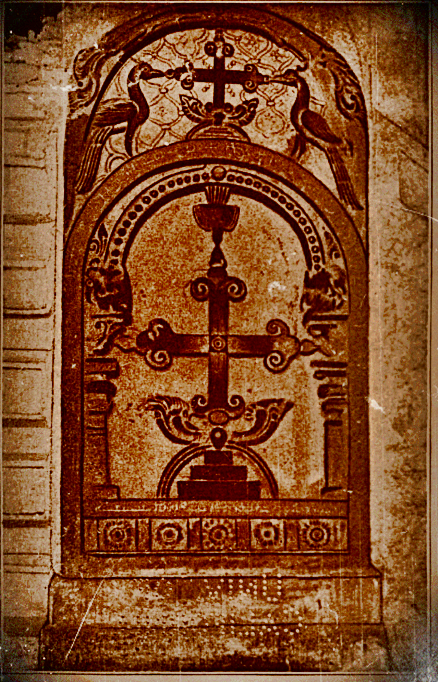
Persian cross at Kottayam valiya pally

Persian crosses were in churches once attended by Nasranis. Out of five Persian crosses, two are in Kottayam Knanaya Valia Palli. According to the archaeologists, the earliest one was made in the 7th century. The cross became a symbol of Christianity in the west, during the time of Constantine (272–337). Saint Thomas Christians of Malabar had hardly any contact with other Christians before the arrival of Knanaya people from Persia. Moreover, two of the oldest church buildings that still exist in South India do not have any marking of a Cross on their original structure. So most probably it was during the 7th century that the cross became a symbol of St. Thomas Christians.

==== Visits corroborating the existence of the Malankara Church ====
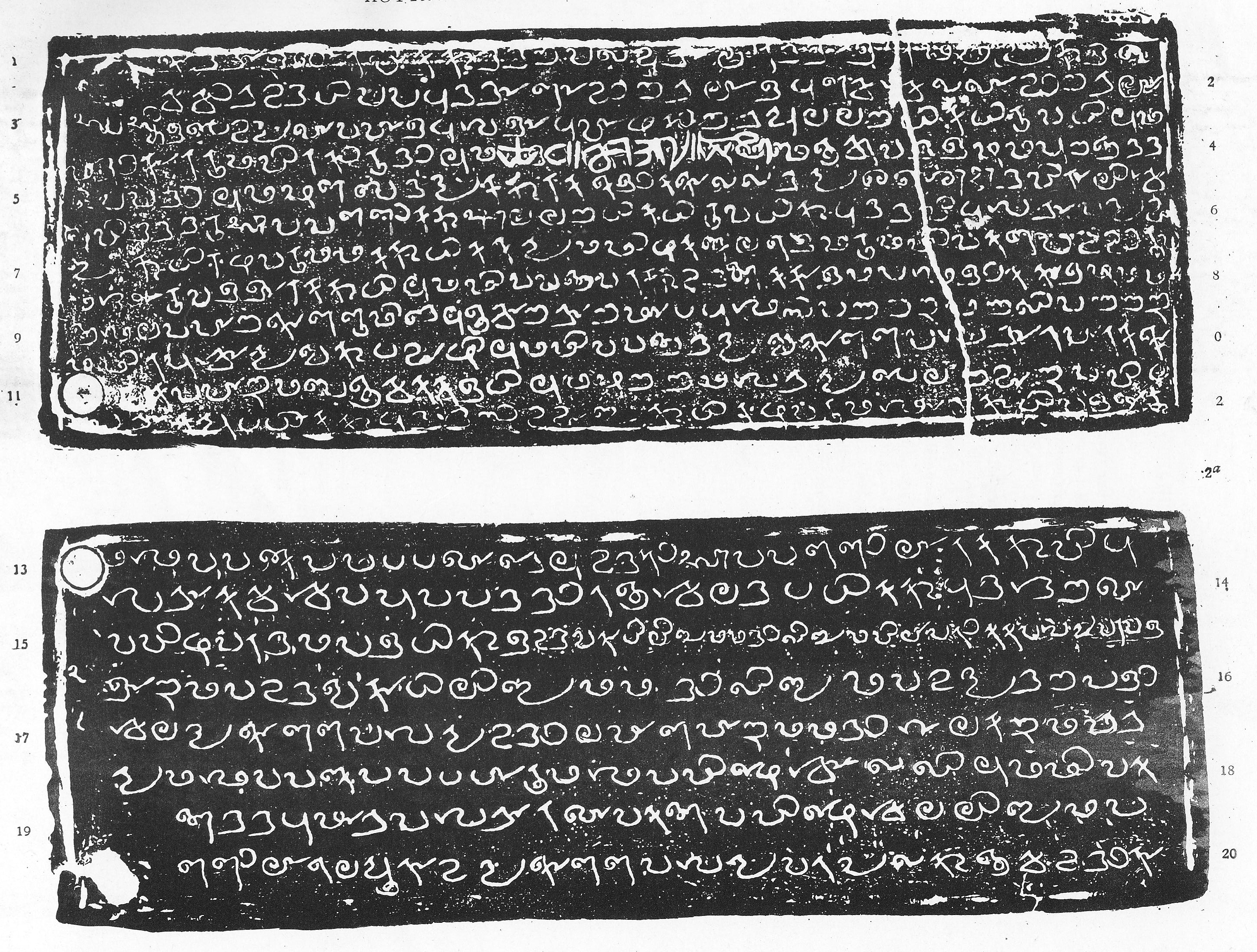
Tharisapalli Copper plate grant (9th century) – One of the reliable documentary evidences of the privileges and influence that Saint Thomas Christians enjoyed in early Malabar. The document contains signatures of the witnesses in Pahlavi, Kufic and Hebrew scripts. It is the oldest documentary evidence available to attest the presence of a Persian Christian community in South India.

The existence of this church in the early centuries is evident in the writings of ancient travelers.

- 325 AD – It is recorded that there was a Syro-Chaldean bishop John "from India and Persia" who assisted at the Council of Nicea in 325 AD.
- 522 AD – an Egyptian Monk, Cosmas Indicopleustes in his writings, Universal Christian Topography mentions that there was this church with a bishop from Persia.
- 883 AD – Alfred the Great (849–899), King of Wessex, England reportedly sent gifts "in India to St. Thomas and to St. Bartholomew", through Sighelm, bishop of Sherborne.
- 1225 AD – Chau Ju-Kua a Chinese traveller visited Kerala.
- 1282 AD – Kublai Khan (1215–1294) Emperor of China sent an emissary to Kollam, It was followed by an emissary from Kollam under the leadership of a St. Thomas Christian.
- 1292 AD – Marco Polo (1254–1324) on his return journey from China visited Kerala, mentions that "The people are idolaters, though there are some Christians and Jews among them".

==== Collection of deeds ====
The rulers of Kerala, in appreciation of their assistance, had given to the Malankara Nazranis, three deeds on copper plates. These are known as Cheppeds, Royal Grants, Sasanam etc. Five sheets of them are now in the custody of the Malankara Mar Thoma Syrian Church Headquarters at Thiruvalla.

1. Iravi Corttan Deed: In the year 774 AD. Sri Vira Raghava Chakravarti, gave a deed to Iravi Corttan of Mahadevarpattanam.
2. Tharissa palli Deed I: Perumal Sthanu Ravi Gupta (844–885) gave a deed in 849 AD, to Isodatta Virai for Tharissa Palli (church) at Curakkeni Kollam. According to historians, this is the first deed in Kerala that gives the exact date.
3. Tharissa palli Deed II: A continuation of the above deed was given sometime after 849 AD.

=== Portuguese period ===
The Portuguese started settling in India with the arrival of Vasco da Gama in 1498. For the next 200 years, they took control over the sea routes and were powerful in the western parts of India. By 1500, Malankara Church was spread from Kannur in the North to Kollam in the South. It included the Saint Thomas Christians and the endogamous group, Knanaya Christians. The Saint Thomas Christians went through changes with the encounter of Portuguese in 1599. In the 16th century the overtures of the Portuguese padroado to initiate the Saint Thomas Christians into the Catholic Church led to the first of several rifts in the community and the establishment of Pazhayakoor and Puthenkoor factions. Since that time further splits have occurred.

==== Synod of Diamper ====
The Malankara Church had hardly any contact with the Western Church. The Portuguese used their power to bring the Malankara Church under Latin jurisdiction. A powerful Archbishop Aleixo de Menezes arrived in Goa in 1595. He then convened a Synod at Udayamperoor, south of Ernakulam, from 20 to 26 June 1599, known as the Synod of Diamper. Here the Archbishop demanded complete submission to the Latin jurisdiction. The representatives sent from various parishes in and around Cochin were forced to accept the decrees read out by the Archbishop.

==== Divisions among Saint Thomas Christians ====
Saint Thomas Christian's – Divisions – History

A protest took place in 1653 with the Coonan Cross Oath. Under the leadership of Archdeacon Thomas (Mar Thoma I), the Thomas Christians publicly took an oath that they wouldn't obey the Jesuit bishops.

Rome sent Carmelites in two groups from the Propagation of the Faith to Malabar headed by Fr. Sebastiani and Fr. Hyacinth. Fr. Sebastiani arrived first in 1655. He began to deal directly with the Archdeacon Thomas (Mar Thoma I). Fr. Sebastiani gained the support of some, especially with the support of Palliveettil Chandy, Alexandar Kadavil and the Vicar of Muttam. These were the three councilors of Mar Thoma I, who was reconciled with Gracia (SJ) before the arrival of Sebastaini, according to Jesuit reports.

The Pazhayakūr Catholic faction persistently challenged the validity of the ordination of Mar Thoma I by laying hands of 12 priests. It led some people to believe what they said and chose to rejoin with the catholic faction.

Between 1661 and 1662, out of the 116 churches, the Carmelites reclaimed eighty-four churches, leaving Archdeacon Mar Thomas I with thirty-two churches. The eighty-four churches and their congregations were the body from which the Syro Malabar Church and the Chaldean Syrian Church have descended. The other thirty-two churches and their congregations represented the nucleus from which the Syriac Orthodox (Jacobites & Orthodox), Thozhiyur, Mar Thoma (Reformed Syrians), Syro Malankara Catholics have originated.

In 1665 with the request of the Archdeacon, Gregorios Abdul Jaleel a Bishop sent by the Syriac Orthodox Patriarch of Antioch, arrived in India. A faithful group under the leadership of the Archdeacon welcomed him. The arrival of the Bishop Gregory of the Syriac Orthodox Church in 1665 marked the beginning of a formal schism among the St. Thomas Christians. Those who accepted the West Syrian theological and liturgical tradition of the Syriac Orthodox Church of Antioch of Gregory became known as the Jacobite, while the Syrian Catholics remained in communion with Rome and later came to be known as the Syro Malabar Church.

==== Oath of the Bent Cross ====
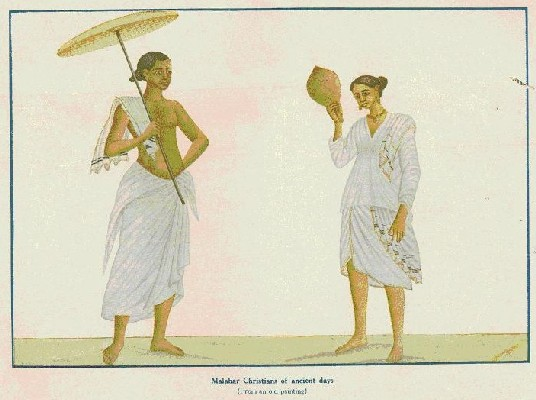
Nasranis or Syrian Christians of Kerala in ancient days (from an old painting). Photo published in the Cochin Government Royal War Efforts Souvenir in 1938.

Under the leadership of their elder Thomas, Nazranis around Cochin gathered at Mattancherry church on Friday, 24 January 1653 (M.E. 828 Makaram 3) and made an oath that is known as the Great Oath of Bent Cross.

Thomas Whitehouse, an Anglican Protestant missionary quotes from the "Church Missionary Society Report for 1818–19, p. 317.

"These Portuguese having murdered Mar Ignatius, we will no longer join them. We renounce them, and do not want either their love or their favour. The present Francis, bishop, shall not be our governor. We are not his children or followers. We will not again acknowledge Portuguese bishops."

Those who were not able to touch the cross-tied ropes on the cross held the rope in their hands and made the oath. Because of the weight it is believed by the followers that the cross bent a little and so it is known as "Oath of the bent cross" (Coonen Kurisu Sathyam).

Four months after this event, according to the beliefs, 12 elders of the church ordained the elder Thomas as their prelate with the ecclesiastical title Mar Thoma I.

Their beliefs and practices before the arrival of the Portuguese as evident in the canons of the Synod of Diamper.

Malankara Church,

- maintained the spiritual presence of the body and blood of Christ in the sacrament.
- had no knowledge of the term purgatory, but prayed for the dead.
- had irregular practice of auricular confession.
- only had a few celibacy clergy in monastic rank, while celibate bishops visited periodically from the Middle East.

=== Dutch period ===
The Dutch East India Company defeated Portuguese for the supremacy of spice trade in Malabar in the year CE 1663. Malankara Nazranis used this opportunity to escape from Latin persecution with the help of the Dutch East India Company. The Dutch brought Bishop Gregorios Abdul Jaleel of Jerusalem of the Syrian Orthodox Church in their trading vessel in CE 1665. Thomas Arkadyaqon who was consecrated as Mar Thoma I entered into a relationship with the West Syriac Orthodox Church and gradually adopted West Syriac liturgy and practices. The Dutch were on the Malabar Coast from 11 November 1604 – 1795. Mar Thoma I to Mar Thoma VI were the prelates during this period.

=== British period ===
The English defeated the Dutch in 1795 and took over Cochin during the time of Mar Thoma VI. In 1806, Rev. Dr. Claudius Buchanan, an Anglican missionary visited Malankara and met Mar Thoma VI. The Bible that was translated from the original Aramaic into Malayalam by two Malpans (Syriac Professors) was printed with the help of Buchanan.

The early British Residents happened to be people of evangelical persuasions and were curious about the native church. In 1808, a bond for the sum of 3000 Star Pagoda (Rs. 10,500) was handed over by General Colin Macaulay, the British Resident in Travancore to the Govt. for Mar Thoma VII with the condition that the interest (known as Vattipanam) be paid to the Metropolitan of the Syrian Church of Malabar. The next Resident Colonel John Munro was approached by a monk (Ramban) Pulikkottil Joseph Ittoop, with the idea of setting up a seminary for the Malankara church. The idea appealed to Munro and under his patronage, the Ramban got the construction completed by 1815. At the resident's behest, the Anglican Church Mission Society sent its missionaries on a Mission of Help, to educate the seminarians. In 1815, Joseph Ramban was consecrated by Philexenos of the Thozhyoor Church and was given the ecclesiastical title Dionysius II. To make the Malankara Church accept him as their head, Col. Munro had to get the rulers of Travancore and Cochin issue Royal proclamations ordering Christians to render obedience to Dionysius II. The next two prelates were also selected by Col. Munro and Royal proclamations were issued to them also.

The British missionaries believed that a reformation of the Malankara Church was imperative (since, for instance, they found in the Indian church "those doctrines which we threw off at the Reformation: "Purgatory ... worshipping and adoration of images and relics, and also invocation of saints'") whose presence made reform imperative, and ventured to bring it about through a process of theological instruction and subtle persuasion. By and by, they prodded Metropolitan Punnathra Dionysius III into convening an assembly of his leading kathanars and missionaries at Mavelikkara to discuss the matter. This meeting which took place on 3 December 1818, appointed a committee of six elder kathanars to come up with scheme for reformation, in consultation with the metropolitan and missionaries. Some priests like Abraham Malpan, Kaithayil Gheevarghese Malpan etc., who worked along with the missionaries at the Kottayam seminary were part of this committee. They were especially receptive to Anglican ideas. Before the committee brought their findings Punnathra Dionosyus died and Cheppad Dionosyus became the Malankara Metropolitan. Cheppad Dionosyus rejected the committee findings and went on with actions that was against the reforms made by his predecessors. Later, as Anglicans such as Joseph Peet tried to dominate the Pazhaya Seminary and started to create other issue in the church, Malankara metropolitan Dionysius IV convened a synod at Mavelikkara on 16 January 1836, where-in the participants resolved not to deviate from their Oriental Orthodox faith or traditions and to remain faithful to the Patriarch of Antioch. This ended the official partnership between the missionaries and the Malankara Syrian Church.

== Reformation in Malankara Church ==
The British Anglicans had a number of well-wishers in the Malankara Church. Priests like Abraham Malpan and others continued to collaborate with the missionaries to reform the church from within. In 1836, Abraham Malpan, Kaithayil Gheevarghese malpan and other reformist kathanars submitted a memorandum to Resident Col. Fraser, levelling charges of abuse against metropolitan Dionysius IV and a 23-point stratagem for the reformation of the church. But as the metropolitan was against all reforms, nothing came of it. Regardless, Abraham Malpan produced a reformed revision of the West Syriac Rite and used it in the seminary and his parishes. Consequently, Abraham Malpan was excommunicated. Malankara metropolitan Dionysius IV refused to ordain anyone trained by reformist malpans.

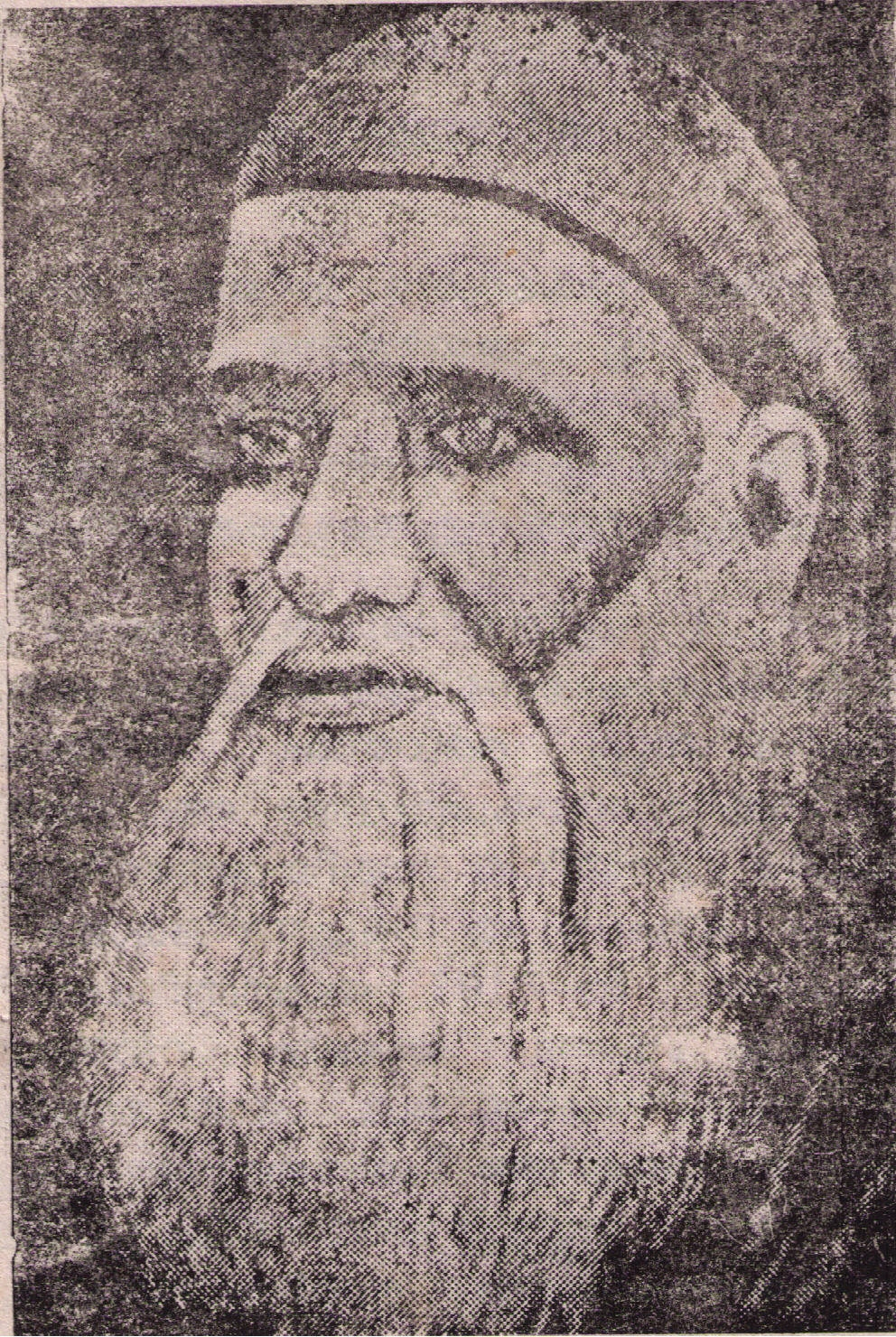
Abraham Malpan

=== Abraham Malpan ===
Though Maramon Palakunnathu Abraham Malpan was bounteous in his temperament, he never hesitated to introduce reforms in both teaching and practice. He also insisted on a high moral standard of conduct for laity and clergy alike. All this created a ferment in the Malankara Church and its effects are still discernible in the church as a whole.

=== Principal reforms ===
Changes carried out during reformation:

1. Icons, pictures, statues, and drawings of saints were removed from churches, and places of worship.
2. Considered the practice of praying for the dead and of doing obeisance at their graves with lighted candles as abhorrent.
3. Intercession of saints and prayers for the dead were discarded. All prayers, worship and devotion to the Blessed Virgin Mary and the saints were omitted. All prayer requests to dead and prayers to uplift the dead from sin and suffering were omitted.
4. Insisted that Sunday services are to be held in a reverent and spiritual way. During that time reading and expounding scriptures is to be done.
5. Conducted worship services, including Holy Communion in the mother tongue, Malayalam along with Syriac.
6. Liturgy amended to eliminate all Monophysite influences.
7. Holy Communion was not celebrated when there were none to receive.
8. Mandated that communion under both kinds should be distributed separately.
9. Auricular confession was discontinued.
10. Believed that those who come for confession should ask for forgiveness with fasting and prayer, instead of offering oil, incense and candles.
11. Insisted that bishops should ordain only candidates who have been examined by them and the malpans (Meaning:- Syriac scholars).
12. Repudiated the custom of smearing charcoal on the forehead on Ash Wednesday.

Doctrinal positions

1. The church accepts the Bible and the Nicene creed as the basis for all matters of faith and doctrine.
2. The church accepts the principle of justification by faith alone.
3. The church accepts the principle of salvation by grace alone.
4. The church adheres to the doctrine of sole mediation of Christ
5. The church emphasizes the Priesthood of All Believers
6. Only the councils of Nicea, Constantinople and Ephesus are commemorated in the Eucharist.
7. The church is neither Nestorian nor Monophysite, but an Oriental Protestant church.
8. The church does not subscribe to the concept of Eucharistic Sacrifice.
9. The Clergy is dedicated to avoiding benefices other than the regulated salary, as a part of the principle of simple life (a Christian ideal of being poor and humble with unclouded conscientious and to be guarded away from mortal greed) for self and the adult laity.
10. Child Baptism is upheld and given to children born in Christian families. Adult Baptism is given to new believers who come from other religions.
11. The church accepts the Perpetual virginity, Divine motherhood and Assumption of Mary, but regards that it has nothing to do with saintly intercession or a mediatrix role.
12. With regard to the title of St. Mary as the Mother of God, the church affirms that the title was used by early Church Fathers. The church also recognises her as the Blessed Virgin Mary, Mother of Christ, who is God, not that the nature of the Word or his divinity received the beginning of its existence from the holy Virgin, but that, since the holy body, which the Word of God became, was born from her, the Word is said to be born according to the flesh (Gospel of St.John:1:14).
13. As to her titles 'Mother of the Church' and 'Mother of all true Christians', biblical interpretation is used (Revelation to St.John:12:17).
14. The church calls St. Mary as Blessed and Holy as expressed in the liturgy.
15. The church endorses in the remembrance and respect of Saints, Martyrs, and acknowledgment of their feast days, but prohibits veneration and intercession through them.
16. The lives of Saints and Martyrs are seen as an exemplar and inspiring to the Christian Model of living.
17. The church does not declare anyone saint or sinner but people who have led exceptionally devout (saintly)lives are acknowledged; and saints declared by all Christian denominations are called Saints thereupon with respect.
18. Identifies Iconography (icons, images and drawings) as Christian or religious art. They are seen as spirituality in art but they are not supposed to be used for worship.
19. Remembrance of dead loved ones is seen as natural and human but prayers for the departed were cancelled out to signify that salvation does not occur after death. There is no belief in purgatory.
20. The Mission of spreading the Gospel is observed as the duty of the church. The church must work with an evangelical zeal.
21. Expounding of the Holy Scriptures and their interpretations are seen as vital to religious services.
22. Syriac is acknowledged as the liturgical language of the church and is used alongside the vernacular for all occasions.
23. The Holy Communion (Holy Qurbana), being a Dominical Sacrament and thus divinely instituted by Christ must be observed utmost spiritually and reverently and not just as a mere ritual.
24. The church gives freedom to the believers on the experience of the Holy Communion (on substantiation). It is understood as the grace of God to the individual. Nevertheless, the experience is viewed as a "Sacred Mystery".
25. Confession is General and is said through prayer before the Holy Communion. The Faithful are supposed to confess their sins privately to God (at home, church, etc.) and to their brethren, if they have sinned against them (Epistle of St.James:5:16).

=== Course of events ===
The first printed Malayalam Bible, translated from Syriac was published in 1811. Known as Ramban Bible it contained only the four Gospels. By 1841, the whole Bible was translated, printed and released. Counselled by Anglican missionaries who taught at the Orthodox Theological Seminary, Mar Thoma XI convened a meeting of representatives of the Malankara Church with the missionaries at Mavelikkara in 1818. In that meeting, a review committee was appointed to recommend reforms, in consultation with the metropolitan and the missionaries. Abraham Malpan, Kaithayil Geevarghese Malpan, Eruthikkal Markose Kathanar, Adangapurathu Joseph Kathanar were members of this committee. This was the first step in carrying out Reformation in Malankara Church.

On 5 September 1836, the reformation was planned. The strategy was determined by a group of 12 clergymen under the leadership of Abraham Malpan. They issued an encyclical describing what they believed were the wrong teachings, a statement listing twenty-four practices of the church which they believed were "evil" and had crept in by its association with other Churches and religions and the same as a petition to a British Resident.

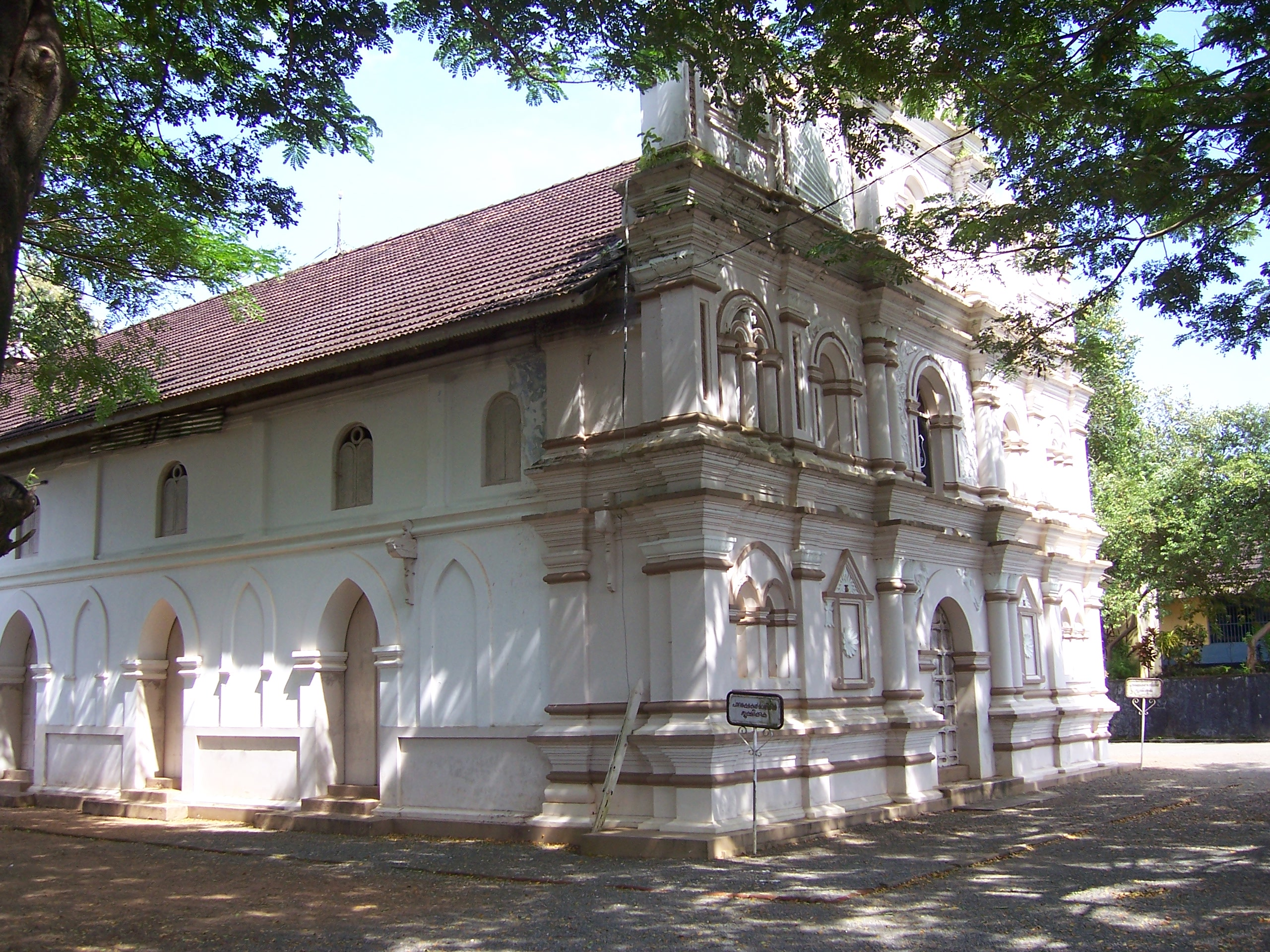
Maramon Mar Thoma Church (2005)

On 27 August 1837 (Sunday), then suspended Abraham Malpan conducted the Holy Communion service in mother tongue Malayalam at his home parish at Maramon. Clergymen, who supported him also did the same thing in various other parishes on the same day.

Connected with a saint (Baselios Yeldo), every year in the first week of October, there was a church festival at Maramon. During that time a wooden statue of that saint, they called "Muthappen" (Meaning:- Elder father) was taken around in procession, and people used to venerate the saint by offering prayers and ask for intercession. In 1837, Abraham Malpan from deeper biblical understandings and of the spiritual scruples surrounding it, took the statue and threw it into a well saying, "Why consult the dead on behalf of the living?" (Isaiah 8:19). So when the festival came there was no statue to be taken out for the procession.

The use of the revised liturgy and the changes he brought about in practices disgruntled Mar Thoma XII. So Abraham Malpan was excommunicated. Deacons trained by him were refused priesthood. But Abraham Malpan was not disheartened. He continued with his spirited reforms. He returned to Maramon. A number of his students joined him to continue their studies. All those who believed that "The Church" needed a revitalization also joined him. Members of parishes in Kozhencherry, Kumbanad, Eraviperoor, Thumpamon, Elanthoor, Kundara, Kottarakara, Mavelikkara, Mallapally, and other places made trips to Maramon to attend the service in Malayalam and listen to his sermons. Doors were also opened for reformation in other places by ministers who supported him.

At this stage, he had three choices in front of him. Repent and go to the beliefs under Antioch; join the Anglican Church with western aid; or go forward with the Cleansing and restoring "The Church" to what he thought would bring it to a pristine position, A church uncontaminated by avarice, venality, licentiousness, and rapacity. He selected the third one. Abraham Malpan died in 1845.

Realising the need for a bishop to lead the reformists, Abraham malpan sent his nephew Deacon Matthews to the patriarch in Antioch. The patriarch, unaware of Mathew's reformation leanings, ordained him as bishop Mathews Athanasius in 1842 and he returned to Travancore in 1843. Metropolitan Dionysius IV sent word to the patriarch that he has been deceived and called for prompt corrective action. Mathews Athanasius did not have the approval of the majority of Malankara Christians who were opposed to reforms. In spite of that, the initial patriarchate delegations failed in their mission to help their loyalists. More than anything else, this was due to the British support for the Reformist bishop and Mathews Athanasius ultimately became Malankara Metropolitan in 1852. Mathews Athanasius published the liturgy without the prayer to St. Mary. He consecrated Ouseph Koorilos, as Metropolitan/Bishop for Malabar Independent Church. The entirety of strong-arm actions incited a number of clergymen and Pulikkottil Ouseph Kathanar went to Antioch in 1864. He returned as Dionysious V in 1865.

The Orthodox conservatives led by Dionysious V repeatedly sought intervention from the See of Antioch. Discerning the source of the reformists' strength, Patriarch Ignatius Peter IV travelled to London. Whilst being there, he made multiple supplications to several high ecclesiastical and governmental authorities, pleading to end the partisan British support for Mathews Athanasius in India. Eventually, the British government and churchmen came to accept a position of neutrality with respect to the affairs of the Malankara Church. The Archbishop of Canterbury Archibald Campbell Tait apprised the patriarch of this change in British stance. Armed with significant success, the patriarch sailed for India.

=== Separation of the Reformists and establishment of Mar Thoma Church ===
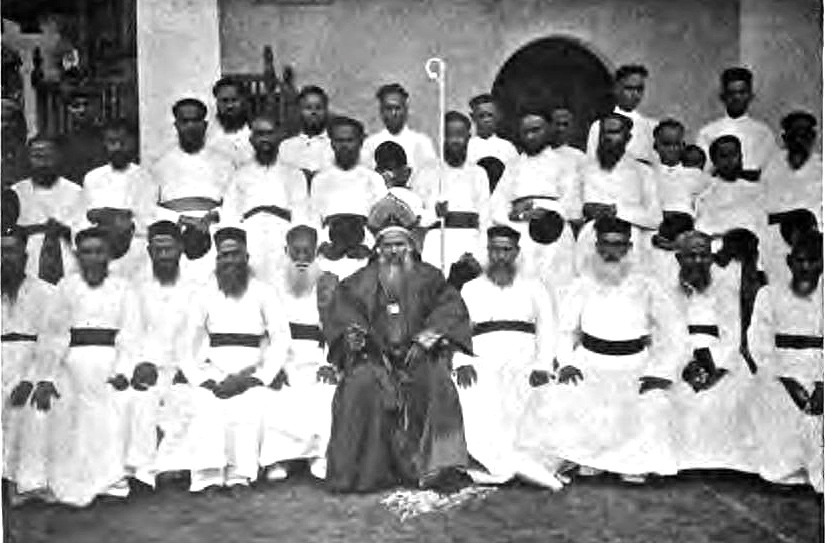
Palakkunnathu Thomas Athanasious (Marthoma XIV) with Kathanars and Deacons of Marthoma Faction, 16 October 1879

After reaching India, the Antiochian patriarch did everything within his power to aid the traditionalist Orthodox faithful. In 1875, Patriarch Ignatius Peter IV excommunicated Mathews Athanasius, Thomas Athanasius (ordained by Mathews Athanasius as his successor) and their Reformist followers from the Malankara Syrian Church. The Reformists desperately besought the Archbishop of Canterbury as well as British authorities, to intervene on their behalf, but to no avail. The British colonial administration abstained from extending their crucial endorsement to any one faction, thereby disengaging themselves from local church matters. Thus, the rival parties had to settle their disputes, entirely by means of court litigations.

Dionysious V and his supporters filed a case on 4 March 1879. (Case O.S. No. 439 of 1054) demanding the possession of the seminary and the control of assets of the church. Thomas Athanasius was then the Metropolitan.

During the course of this litigation (1879–1889), answering a question Thomas Athanasius Metropolitan said,

The Episcopal throne of Patriarch is the throne of St. Peter, while the throne of Malankara Church is that of St. Thomas. Malankara Church is as old as the Church in Antioch, equal in status, and both are independent.

A meeting was convened by the maharaja of Travancore, before the final verdict was given, Athanasius testified that,

Malankara Church was never under any foreign rule and that he was unwilling to move away from the teachings or give the authority and the Church possessions to a foreign Patriarch.

The final verdict which came on 12 July 1889, upheld the conservative position on the Syriac Orthodox Patriarchate of Antioch, as being the only competent ecclesiastical authority historically authorized to ordain and appoint bishops to the Malankara Metropolitanate. The ruling declared Dionysious V the rightful Malankara Metropolitan owing to his loyalty to the Antiochian patriarchate known as Jacobite Syrian Christian Church wherefrom he received direct consecration and his acceptance by the majority of Malankara Christians. The judgement also dismissed all claims of the reformists and their leader Thomas Athanasius to the Metropolitanate or its assets. The Metran Kakshi decided to remain as an independent Malankara Church, and to give primary authority to the Holy Bible and continue as the successors of St. Thomas throne. They separated and established the Oriental Protestant Mar Thoma Syrian Church.

== Independence movement and the Emergency ==
The wider Syrian Christian community, to which the church belongs, was in open conflict with the Travancore government and its Diwan during the 1930s. The church's annual Maramon Convention also gave a platform to reformers from outside it. On 9 March 1936 the Ezhava leader C. V. Kunhiraman addressed the convention and declared that the Ezhava community would convert to Christianity, part of a campaign in which Ezhava leaders used the prospect of conversion to press for temple entry. The Temple Entry Proclamation followed that November.

During his tour of Travancore in January 1937, Mahatma Gandhi stayed at the church's M.T. Seminary School in Kottayam as the guest of its principal, K. K. Kuruvilla, who also headed the Mar Thoma Theological Seminary and was a follower of Gandhi. Titus Theverthundiyil of Maramon, known as Titusji and a member of the church, was the only Christian among the marchers who accompanied Gandhi on the 1930 Salt March. Other members included O. C. Chacko of Kuriannoor, who served in the Indian National Army, and C. V. George of Ranni, a lawyer later ordained as a priest of the church, who was recognised by the government as a freedom fighter.

In 1947, when the Diwan, C. P. Ramaswami Iyer, moved to declare Travancore independent, Metropolitan Abraham Mar Thoma argued publicly that the state should join the Indian Union, and the church's Sabha Council passed a resolution condemning the plan. According to a later account by Metropolitan Joseph Mar Thoma, the government responded by taking back land in Thiruvananthapuram that Maharaja Moolam Thirunal had granted to the church and assigning it to the university. He wrote that it also considered imprisoning the Metropolitan, and that people from central Travancore gathered around his residence to prevent this.

According to the Christian Institute for the Study of Religion and Society (CISRS), most established churches in India endorsed the Emergency when it was declared in 1975. In August 1976 Metropolitan Juhanon Mar Thoma wrote to Prime Minister Indira Gandhi asking that it be withdrawn in stages, citing the detention of opposition leaders and restrictions on the press. Joseph Mar Thoma later wrote that Juhanon Mar Thoma was threatened with arrest and that the Chief Minister of Kerala, C. Achutha Menon, prevented it. M. M. Thomas, a lay theologian of the church, criticised the Emergency as an assault on democracy, a position he set out in Response to Tyranny (1979).

Juhanon Mar Thoma had earlier started a programme to provide land and houses for the landless, which the church says preceded the Bhoodan movement.

== Faith and practices of the church ==
=== Liturgy ===
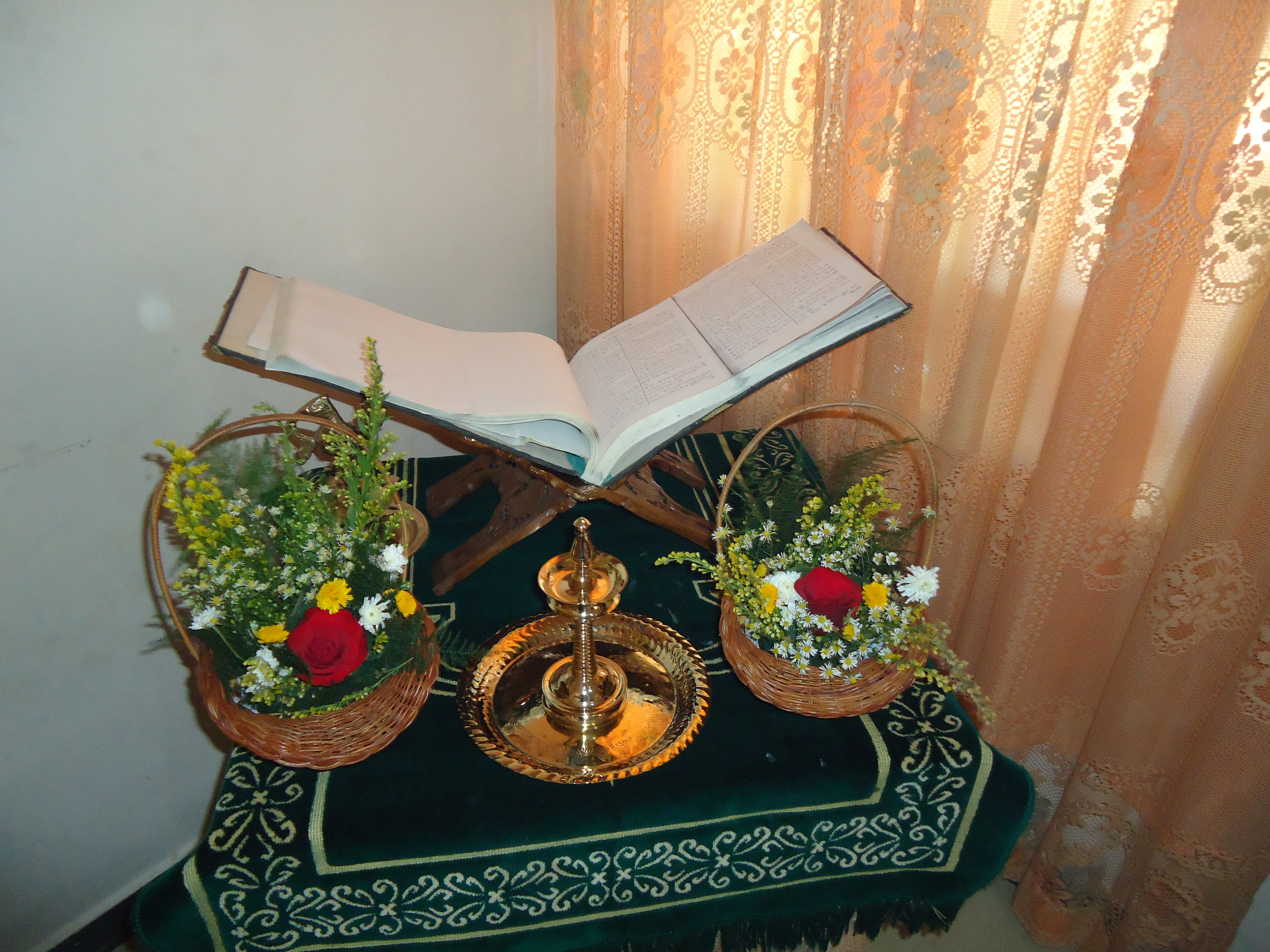
Ramban Bible, translated by Kayamkulam Philipose Ramban

The word "liturgy" is derived from the Greek word leitourgia (leitos/loas: people +ergos: work) which means a service rendered to God and people. When the Bible was not available, the liturgy took the role of the Bible, much of the scripture is formed in the liturgical context. The original liturgical language used by the Malankara Church was Aramaic and Hebrew. The Bible that was in use also was in Hebrew. Later when Syriac replaced Aramaic in eastern countries, and the arrival of Knanaya people from Persia in AD 345, the Malankara Church began using Syriac. The Bible used in the Malankara Church is called the "Peshitta" and was in Estrangelo Syriac. This was the Bible that was in use till Malayalam (the language of Kerala) translation was available. The first printed Malayalam Bible, translated from Syriac was published in 1811 by Philipose Ramban with the provision of Claudius Buchanan, known as Ramban Bible it contained the four Gospels. (A copy of this Bible was later presented to Buchanan and is kept at Cambridge University Library.) By 1841, the whole Bible was translated, printed and released by missionary-scholar Benjamin Bailey with the help of Chandu Menon, a tahsildar in the Madras State service. Even though bishops from Syrian churches visited Kerala, they did not attempt to change the Bible into the newer forms of Syriac or to the native language. In June 1876, Patriarch of Antioch Ignatius Pathrose IV visited Kerala and a majority of the Malankara Church accepted him as the head of their church. But those who did not join them continued to follow their own leaders and kept their peculiar identity garnered from reformation. After Mar Thoma Church had begun to use the liturgy in mother tongue Malayalam, other churches continued to follow the same for a deeper engagement with the laity. A revised version of the ancient and apostolic liturgy known as People's liturgy, the Liturgy of St James (Gal.1:18-19), was adopted in the church, later the liturgy has been translated into various languages, including English, Hindi, Tamil, Telugu, and Kannada. The Mar Thoma church follows the West Syrian liturgical tradition and is Eastern in the nature of its worship and ethos.

There are six liturgies other than Saint James liturgy (Mar Yakub liturgy) used in the church and a priest can exercise freedom in using them but should satisfy the requirement of "joint congregation act/involvement" and permission from the respective diocese head. The six other liturgies are:

- Mar Dionysius Liturgy
- Patriarch Mar Christos Liturgy
- Mar Peter Liturgy
- Mar Juhanon Liturgy
- Mar Thoma of Harkalia Liturgy
- Mar Ivanios Liturgy

=== Canonical hours ===
The Marthomites pray the canonical hours as contained in the Shehimo at seven fixed prayer times while facing the eastward direction.

=== Sacraments of the church ===
The seven sacraments (Koodashas) of Mar Thoma Church are:

- Chrismation (Smearing of Holy Muron)
- Baptism (Mamodisa)
- Common Confession (Kumbasaram)
- Holy Communion (Qurbana)
- Marriage
- Unction (Anointing of the Sick)
- Ordination

== Fasts and festivals of Mar Thoma Church ==
Mar Thoma Church's evolution from a reformation base only strengthened it to follow best practices of its Syriac traditions. Lents (Nombu) and other church festivals are church's structural and liturgical base. Feasts and fasts are an integral part of the traditions of a Christian community. However, the way believers follow these fasts and feasts differ from church to church. Mar Thoma church being a part of Antiochian tradition churches, follows all the canonical feasts and fasts which are related to important events in the life of Jesus Christ. The constitution of the church states that the feasts, fasts or lents are not to be removed or altered from the church at any time. It Includes Observance of the Sunday as the day of the lord and other fast and feast days in the church calendar. Each Sunday is dedicated to meditating on subjects prescribed in church lectionary.

=== Fasts of the Church ===
The church mainly observes the fifty days before the period of Easter and twenty-five days before Christmas as fast days. Mar Thoma church doesn't have a canonical instruction on how a believer should follow the Lents. However, as a matter of practice believers follow certain dietary restrictions with the right spiritual diet as followed over generations. A person committed to lent, is in a spiritual training with introspection and renewal of their commitment to be an imitation of set principles by Jesus Christ. With the will for fellowship, each person anchors bio-psycho-spiritually with Jesus Christ through prayer. Lent is often considered as a refreshful practice for thoughts and soul for cultivating seven gifts of the Holy Spirit (Book of Isaiah 11:1–3). An amount of money that is saved by giving up certain types of luxuries during the lent period is typically deposited in the offertory on Good Friday for the church's social services for the afflicted and hungry (Book of Isaiah 58:7–12). Post-modernistic view about lent is as an empowering practice that transforms a person for making social and interpersonal impact. Every weekday in Great Lent there are specific liturgical services which include prostration or profound bows a number of times. The lents of the church are:

- Great Fast: consists of 40 days from the second week of February (Petrutha:Reconciliation) ending with 40th Friday, this symbolizes the forty days fast of Jesus Christ in the desert and extends with a ten days fast, that signifies the betrayal, passion, and crucifixion of Jesus Christ (Passion Week-Hasha) as per oriental tradition. It spreads to 7 weeks with a total of 50 days (Ambathu Nombu). Ash Wednesday is the first Wednesday of the lent, it is not observed with significance.
- Nativity Fast (Yeldo lent): 25 days prior to Christmas which includes annunciation to Zechariah and to Joseph.
- Dormition of Mary (Shunoyo Lent): 15 days, in August. (This is not observed widely but some may fulfill this fast along with the reformation day celebration without the doctrinal underpinnings.)
- Fast of Nineveh (Lent of Yonah): 3 days in January.
- Apostles' Fast (Lent of Sleeha's): 13 specific days from the second week of June.

=== Feasts of the Church ===
The main feast or festival days of the church are Feast of Nativity, Baptism of Jesus, Feast of Annunciation, Palm Sunday, Easter, Feast of the Ascension, Day of Pentecost, and Feast of the Transfiguration. The most important festivals of the church are that of in Holy Week (Hasha) and Christmas. The festivals of Mar Thoma Church can be divided into 4 categories, they are:

- Maranaya Festivals- Festivals that are based on events in the life of Jesus Christ: Mainly they are Danaha (Baptism of Christ/Epiphany), Mayaltho (Presentation of Jesus at the Temple), Suboro (Feast of the Annunciation), Hosanna (Palm Sunday), Easter (Resurrection Sunday or Kyomtho), Christmas (Feast of Nativity or Yaldo).
- Roohanaya Festivals- Festivals related to Holy Spirit. Mainly they are Suloko (Feast of the Ascension), Sunday of Pentecost or Trinity Sunday- It is fifty days after Easter Day (at times it is observed separately), it commemorates the descent of the holy spirit on to the Church, Day of Transfiguration- 10th week after the day of Pentecost, this is when traditionally low abv vinification is started at homes for Christmas.
- Ethanaya Festivals- Festivals related to the church like Kudos Etho: The sanctification of the church and beginning of liturgical year, Hudos Etho – The dedication or renewal of the church, Reformation Day (August), Mar Thoma Church Day (In relation to Thomas the Apostle on 21 December).
- Dukrano Festivals: Church day separated for meditation on Martyrdom of Apostles without intercession (This is not observed widely except Saint Stephen's Day).

The Ethanaya Feasts Kudos Etho and Hudos Etho is in the second and third Sundays of November, it is also considered as the beginning of a liturgical year. The Holy Week or Passion Week (Hasha) is the week before Easter and the last week of Great Lent, this includes Palm Sunday (Hosanna- Commemorating princely entry of Christ into Jerusalem), Maundy Thursday (Pesach- Commemorating last meal or passover of Jesus Christ with his disciples and the Holy Communion was instituted on this day (Note: First Corinthians 11:23-26)), Good Friday (Holy Friday – Commemorating crucifixion of Christ at Golgotha), Joyous Saturday, and Easter (Resurrection Sunday – Commemorating Resurrection of Christ).

Christmas is celebrated by all members of the Church, to commemorate the birth of Jesus Christ. During this time, parishes will be involved in Christmas carols and the celebration of Christmas Day church services with Christmas cakes. Before the 1850s, Mar Thoma church celebrated Christmas on 6 January, the day of Epiphany. By the end of last century, Christmas trees, Christmas Stars-an illuminative paper decoration made in the form of star or sunburst, Christmas lights, Sky lanterns, Nativity crib, Santa Claus' and other related festive traditions have appeared in the church.

== Ordination of women and transgender people ==
There are no theological impediments to the ordination of women, in the Mar Thoma Syrian Church. Being theologically Protestant, this church endorses the Priesthood of all believers. However the church hasn't ordained women yet, as it is not in accordance with Eastern Christian traditions. Female Archbishop Kay Goldsworthy of the Anglican Church of Australia, was one of the main speakers at the 2020 Maramon Convention, organized by the Mar Thoma Church. On the question of women's ordination, the Mar Thoma church's official response to the Baptism, Eucharist and Ministry document of the World Council of Churches reads,

Women now are able to share responsibilities which were formerly exclusively male. This change in society must be seen as an act of God. This must be reflected in increased sharing by women in the priestly ministry of the church. There is no theological barrier to such a development in the Mar Thoma Church. However, the Mar Thoma Church presently has barriers due to custom, culture and tradition in allowing women to share in the ordained ministry of the church. It is earnestly hoped that these will break down as men develop greater consciousness of the change of times and women become willing and open to new challenges that God is opening before them. At the same time we also earnestly hope that ways will be found so that ordination of women does not create new barriers on the way to mutual recognition of ministry and sacraments.

However, the Mar Thoma Church has provided caution that the BEM Document should not be considered as a confession of faith and order, rather it should be seen as a document that closes that gap between churches across the world.

A word of caution is necessary before we conclude this response. While the Mar Thoma Church accepts the BEM document as a satisfactory starting point for interchurch conversation, we are eager that it should not be made a confession of faith and order. The churches should be free to develop patterns of church life drawing upon the indigenous cultural heritage remaining in continuity and faithfulness to the authentic tradition of the church across the ages.

— Mar Thoma Sabha Council, Churches respond to BEM VOL 4, Faith and order. Page 13

The Mar Thoma Church is involved with several movements and projects, aiming at the upliftment and empowerment of the Transgender community. In 2018, two transgender speakers were given the stage, to address the Maramon convention of the Mar Thoma Church. Joseph Mar Thoma, a former head of the Mar Thoma Church, made it clear that there are no biblical grounds to deny priesthood and baptism for transgender individuals. It is also noteworthy that Joseph Mar Thoma, the former head of the Mar Thoma Church took the example of "Philip and the Eunuch", and how the Eunuch played an important role in development of Ethiopian Christianity.

Theodosius Mar Thoma the current head of the Mar Thoma Church, has said that the time will come, when transgender people would be ordained as priests in the church. He said,

It is quite possible. But don't expect this all of a sudden. It may take time, but it is likely.

== Political and inter-religious engagement ==
The lay theologian M. M. Thomas, a member of the church, was influenced by Marxist thought in the 1940s without fully embracing it, and later saw value in liberation theology while cautioning against treating people's movements as beyond criticism.

The former Metropolitan Philipose Mar Chrysostom cooperated with communist leaders in Kerala on social justice initiatives and drew criticism for it. He had opposed communism earlier in his career and continued to clash with communist politicians when he felt they intruded on religious groups.

During protests against the Waqf (Amendment) Act, Y. T. Vinayaraj, a Mar Thoma priest who has published on Dalit theology, spoke in opposition to the legislation, describing it as discriminatory toward Muslims.

Mar Thoma clergy have also participated in interfaith events, including Ramadan programs in Qatar and India, where speakers emphasized dialogue, coexistence, and mutual respect between Christians and Muslims.

== Organizations ==
=== Educational institutions ===
Nine colleges, six higher secondary schools, one vocational higher secondary school, eight high schools, one training school, five technical institutions plus other educational institutions owned and managed by individuals and by parishes.

=== Other institutions ===
There are 38 social welfare institutions, 14 destitute homes and ten hospitals.

Theological education for clergy and laity is provided by the Mar Thoma Theological Seminary in Kottayam, established in 1926, which has an annexe at Karukachal; by Dharma Jyoti Vidya Peeth in Haryana; by the Episcopal Jubilee Institute of Evangelism in Thiruvalla; and by four other institutes: the Easow Mar Timotheos Memorial centres at Sihora and Hoskote, and the A.M.M. Bible Institute and Vanitha Mandiram near Thiruvalla.

The church has three study centres, at Manganam, Kottayam and Thiruvananthapuram, which run study programmes and host dialogue between church and society on ethical, social and religious questions.

The religious education of children is the work of the Sunday School Samajam, founded in 1905. Work among young people is carried on by the Yuvajana Sakhyam, organised in 1933, and the women's department is the Mar Thoma Suvishesha Sevika Sangham, organised in 1919.

==== Ashrams and religious communities ====
The church also runs ashrams and religious communities, in Kerala and in mission areas elsewhere in India.

Ashrams and religious communities of the Mar Thoma Church
Name	Place	State
Christa Mitra Ashram	Ankola	Karnataka
Christa Panthi Ashram	Sihora	Madhya Pradesh
Suvartha Premi Samithi	Pithoragarh	Uttarakhand
Christu Dasa Ashram	Palakkad	Kerala
Mar Thoma Dayaraya Samooham	Punalur	Kerala
Santhigiri Ashram	Aluva	Kerala
Mar Thoma Sanyasini Samooham	Elanthoor	Kerala

== Maramon Convention ==
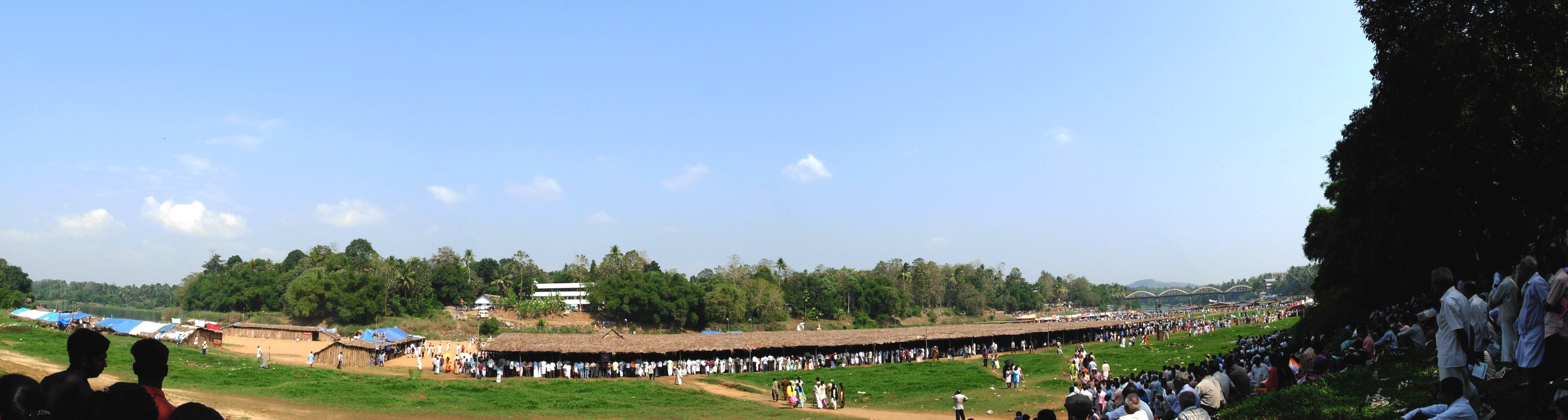
113th Maramon Convention – 2008
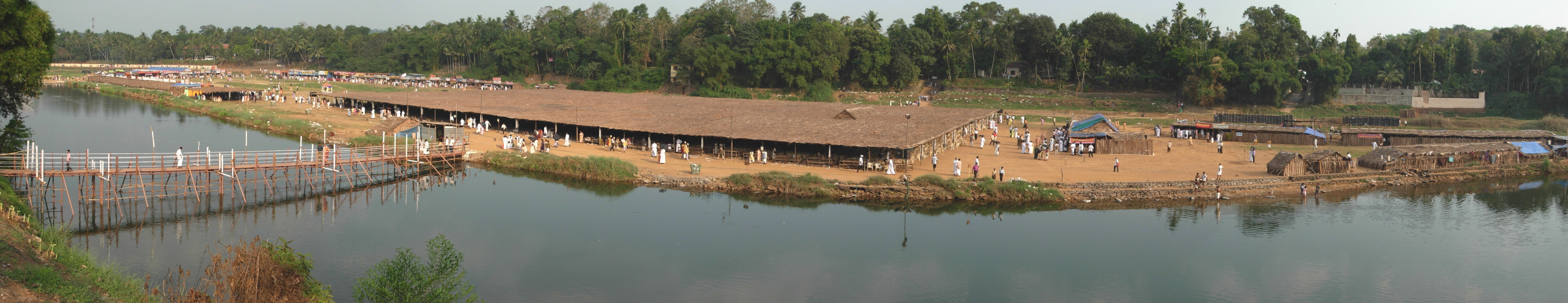
114th Maramon Convention – 2009

The Mar Thoma Evangelistic Association, the missionary wing of the Mar Thoma Church, is in charge of organising the Maramon Convention, One of the largest annual Christian gathering in Asia. It takes place in Maramon, near Kozhencherry, during February on the vast sand-bed of the Pampa River next to the Kozhencherry Bridge. The first convention was held in March 1895 for 10 days.

The Maramon Convention is principally an assembly of Christians who go there once a year to listen to the gospel as read and expounded by Christian leaders from all over India as well as abroad. This provides a revived ideological and experiential faith in accordance to the need of the laity and period of time. It is in tune with Mathew 6:5. Attendees sit on the sand bed, Old and invalid people are given chairs with separate sponsored or paid seating arrangements. Generally, one session is for ecumenical messages by invited leaders of other churches.

== Ecumenical relations ==
The church actively participates in the programs of the World Council of Churches, the Christian Conference of Asia, the National Council of Churches and the Kerala Christian Council. Mar Thoma Church was attending meetings of World Council of Churches from its first meeting in 1948 at Amsterdam. At the WCC meetings held in Evanston, Juhanon Mar Thoma Metropolitan was elected as one of its presidents. Since then the Church representatives attended all the General meetings.

=== Relationship with the Anglican Communion ===
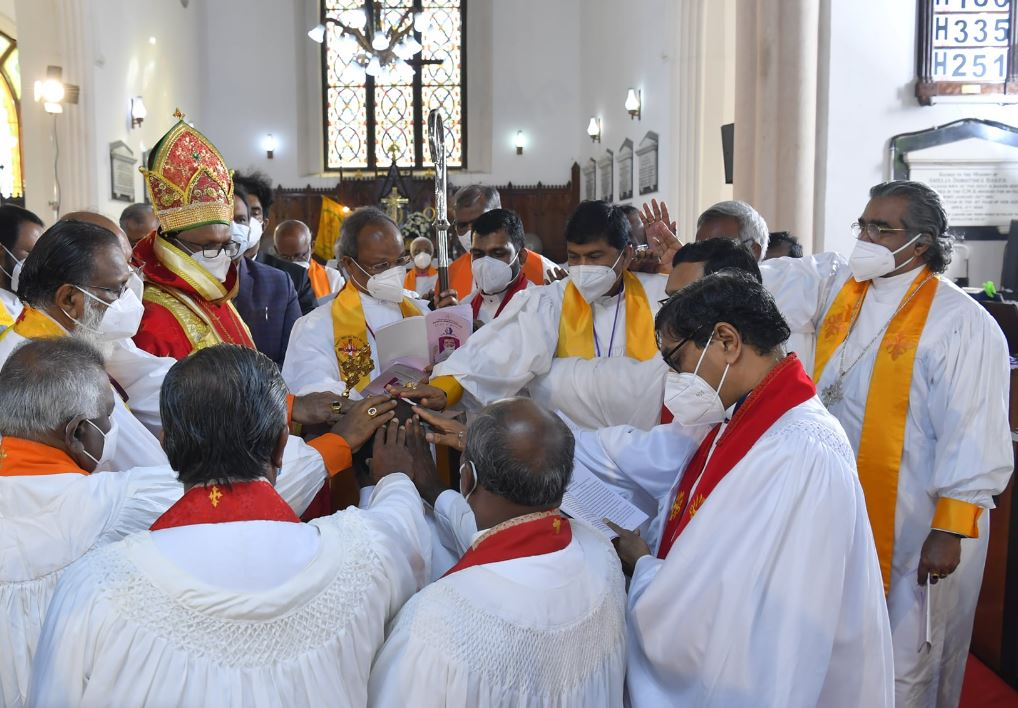
Laying on of hands by CSI Moderator Dharmaraj Rasalam, Theodosius Mar Thoma Metropolitan and other bishops, during the bishopric consecration of Sabu Koshy Cherian

Rev. Canagasabey being consecrated as bishop by Rt. Rev. Duleep Chickera, Rt. Rev. Shantha Francis and Rt. Rev. Dr. Euyakim Mar Coorilos Episcopa

Due to the historic links of the Malankara reformation to the Anglican missionary enterprise in colonial India and the resultant formative influence, the Mar Thoma Church maintain close relations with the Anglican Church. The Church's theology and doctrines are closest to that of Anglicans; hence Mar Thoma as well as some Anglican Churches commemorate each other's bishops, in their respective Eucharists. The Mar Thoma church is in full communion with all the churches of the Anglican Communion. The two denominations fully accept each other's ministry. Mar Thoma bishops also take part in the Lambeth Conferences. Pastoral care and episcopal oversight for Mar Thoma congregations and dioceses in the Western world, comes from territorial Anglican provinces, on an as-needed basis. In the UK, such a partnership exists with the Church of England, in Ireland with the Church of Ireland, in the US with the Episcopal Church, in Canada with the Anglican Church of Canada and in Australia with the Anglican Church of Australia. In India, their communion partners are the Church of South India and the Church of North India. These three churches work together on various issues as the Communion of Churches in India. One such issue is focusing on transgender rights.

Mar Thoma bishops have acted as co-consecrators in the ordination of Anglican bishops, on a number of occasions. In 1970, Mar Thoma bishop Alexander Mar Theophilus was a co-consecrator, who ordained seven original CNI bishops, as part of the inauguration of the united Church of North India. In 2011, Joseph Mar Thoma participated as co-consecrator, in the episcopal ordination of Thomas K. Oommen of the Church of South India. In 2011, Mar Thoma bishop Euyakim Mar Coorilos participated as co-consecrator, in the episcopal ordination of Dhiloraj Canagasabey of the Church of Ceylon. In 2015, Mar Thoma bishop Geevarghese Mar Theodosius participated as co-consecrator, in the episcopal ordination of Peter Eaton of the Episcopal Church (United States). Female primate Katharine Jefferts Schori was the principal consecrator for this ordination.

=== Relationship with the Old Catholic Churches of the Union of Utrecht ===
Talks between the Mar Thoma Syrian Church and the Old Catholic Churches of the Union of Utrecht began in 2005. From the very beginning, the representatives of these churches were optimistic about a positive outcome. This was due to the fact that both Mar Thoma and Old Catholic churches were already in full communion with the Anglican Communion, separately, for a long time. This pre-existing relationship with Anglicans made the relations between Mar Thoma and Old Catholic denominations essentially transitive.

During the course of discussions, Mar Thoma delegates clarified that even though their church commemorates only the first three ecumenical councils in its liturgy, it still recognizes and respects the four subsequent councils, without formally accepting them. Meanwhile, the Old Catholic churches officially accepted the first seven councils. Most importantly, both churches affirmed that the one incarnate Christ is fully human and fully divine in agreement with the essence of the christological teachings of the fourth Council of Chalcedon. Therefore, it emerged that the only real difference between the Old Catholic and Mar Thoma churches in this regard was that the former used the language of the council of Chalcedon to express its faith, while the latter did not. Findings from earlier Anglican–Mar Thoma dialogues dispelled all doubts about the possible persistence of Nestorianism within the Mar Thoma church. Eventually, the Mar Thoma Syrian Church and the Old Catholic Churches of the Union of Utrecht entered into a relationship of full communion in February 2024.

=== Relationship with Lutheran churches ===
There is an ongoing ecumenical dialogue between the Mar Thoma Syrian Church and the Lutheran churches. Swedish bishop Johannes Sandegren of the Tamil Evangelical Lutheran Church, acted as co-consecrator in the episcopal ordination of five Mar Thoma bishops. In 1937, bishop Sandegren assisted Titus II Mar Thoma to ordain Juhanon Mar Timotheus and Mathews Mar Athanasius. In 1953, bishop Sandegren took part in the ordination of Alexander Mar Theophilus, Thomas Mar Athanasius and Philipose Mar Chrysostom.

=== Relationship with the Malabar Independent Syrian Church ===
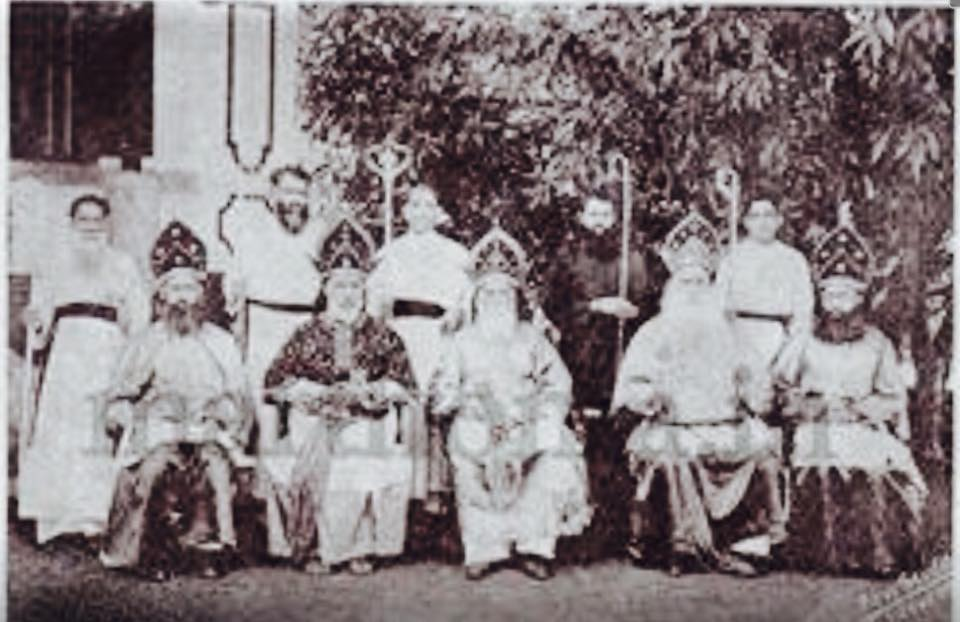
The ordinations of Juhanon Thimothious (later Juhanon Thoma) and Mathews Athanasius, by Titus II Mar Thoma, Abraham Mar Thoma and Metropolitan of Thozhiyoor Kuriakose Koorilos

The Malabar Independent Syrian Church, also called the Thozhiyur or Anjoor Church, has strong links with the Mar Thoma Church, although the doctrinal positions of each are not fully accepted by the other. The Thozhiyur Church has always followed the Syriac Orthodox rite, while the Mar Thoma Church uses a reformed liturgy and tends towards reformed theology.

In the early 19th century, episcopal consecration for the Malankara Church was sought from Thozhiyur. Geevarghese Mar Philoxenos II consecrated three successive Malankara Metropolitans: Pulikkottil Dionysius II (Mar Thoma X), Punnathra Dionysius III and Cheppad Dionysius IV. He also held the office himself for several years, by royal proclamation, and gave up the title each time a successor was consecrated.

Legal rulings in the 1850s established the Thozhiyur Church's independence of both the Patriarch of Antioch and the Malankara Metropolitan. In the early 1860s Metropolitan Mathews Athanasius defended that independence in the Madras High Court against Euyakim Mar Koorilos, who sought to place the Thozhiyur Church under Antioch, and the church has been known as the Malabar Independent Syrian Church since that verdict.

The death of Thomas Athanasius in 1893 without a consecrated successor left the reformist party in crisis. The two Thozhiyur bishops, Mar Athanasius I and Mar Koorilose V, travelled to Kottayam and in 1894 consecrated Titus I Mar Thoma as Metropolitan. Thozhiyur bishops have taken part in every Mar Thoma episcopal consecration since, including those of 1937 and 1953, and Mar Thoma Metropolitans have in turn consecrated bishops for Thozhiyur.

According to its constitution, the Thozhiyur Church should seek the advice and guidance of the Mar Thoma Metropolitan when difficulties arise, although neither church has authority over the other. The centenary of the relationship was celebrated in the Sabha Mandalam on 14 September 1994.

=== Relationship with Malankara Orthodox Syrian Church ===
Malankara Mar Thoma Syrian Church and Malankara Orthodox Syrian Church have the same Malankara antiquity and heritage that dates back to Saint Thomas' mission in Kerala, as well as West Syriac St James liturgical traditions dating back to the Puthenkoor faction. These churches are often referred as Swadeshi churches as both have their spiritual and temporal leaders based within Kerala, India unlike some other Christian Churches of Kerala. However, there is no official Holy communion relationship between both the churches.

At the same time, both clergy and laity come together in matters of social and public concern. Ecumenical worship services during Christmas season is common outside Kerala among the diaspora, and also at a number of places within Kerala.

Marriages between the members of the two churches are common given the mutual historical privileged caste status of Kerala Syrian Christian community, although ecclesiastical authorities like to discourage such alliances and may not grant proper documents. Leaders of both churches have held ecumenical dialogues to discuss their differences in theology, traditions or practices that still remain pending clarification for mutual recognition, joint theological education and research, and communion; such efforts remain ongoing.

There are a number of church leaders in both the churches who are respected across the larger Syrian Christian community, irrespective of their individual affiliation. Mar Thoma church has established an internal tradition that it will never consecrate an Episcopal or Metropolitan with the Greek name Baselios The ecclesiastical title of Catholicos of Edessa, which is now being used for primates of the Malankara Orthodox Syrian Church (holding the ecclesiastical title of Catholicos of the East) and Jacobite Syrian Christian Church (holding ecclesiastical title of Catholicos of India). Both Mar Thoma Church and Malankara Orthodox Church believes that their Primates are occupying the Ecclesiastical Throne of St Thomas.

Both churches share church buildings to conduct their worship services at several places such as Chengannur, Koorthamala, Bahrain, Hyderabad etc. with peace and mutual love. These serve as examples of Christian Unity and brotherhood that other churches can learn from and replicate.

=== Relationship with the Catholic Church ===
Bishop Philipose Mar Chrysostom of the Mar Thoma Syrian Church attended the Second Vatican Council as an observer. However, official ecumenical dialogues between Mar Thoma and Catholic churches began only in December 2023. On 11 November 2024, an episcopal delegation from the Mar Thoma Church, led by Joseph Mar Barnabas Suffragan Metropolitan met with Pope Francis, in Rome. In an address to the Mar Thoma delegates, Pope Francis acknowledged the usual Mar Thoma self-identification as a church that bridges Syriac Christianity and Protestantism. He said,

Your Church, heir to both the Syriac tradition of the Saint Thomas Christians and the Reformed tradition, rightly defines itself as a "bridge Church" between East and West.

The second meeting of the bilateral dialogue was held in Kottayam on 9 December 2024.

== See also ==
- Saint Thomas Christians
- Malankara Church
- Eastern Protestant Christianity
- West Syriac Rite
- List of Marthoma Syrian Christians
- Saint Thomas Christians
- Malankara Syrian Metropolitans
- South India Reformed Churches
