= Abraham Mar Thoma =

His Beatitude The Most Reverend Aboon Dr. Abraham Mar Thoma XVII Mar Thoma Metropolitan
- of the Apostolic Throne of St Thomas
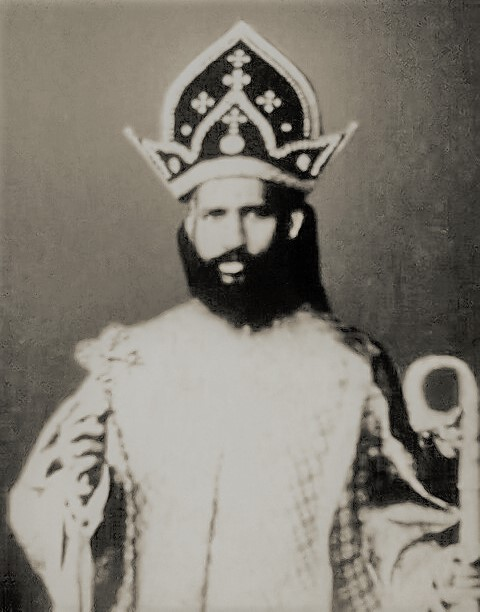
- Church: Mar Thoma Syrian Church
- Installed: 1944
- Term ended: 1 September 1947
- Predecessor: Titus II Mar Thoma
- Successor: Juhanon Mar Thoma

Orders
- Ordination: 5 December 1914
- Consecration: 24 December 1916
- Rank: Mar Thoma Metropolitan (Ecclesiastical Title of the Head of the Ancient Indian Church)

Personal details
- Born: M. N. Abraham; 30 October 1879 Kalloopara
- Died: 1 September 1947 (aged 67) Tiruvalla
- Buried: Tiruvalla

Abraham Mar Thoma XVII (born Maret Ninan Abraham; 30 October 1879 – 1 September 1947) was the Metropolitan of the Malankara Mar Thoma Syrian Church from 1944 to 1947. He was called Maret Kochu Thirumeni by his people. Among the bishops of Malankara Churches Including Malankara Mar Thoma Syrian Church, Abraham Mar Thoma was the first to earn a Doctoral degree.

== Early life ==
Abraham Mar Thoma was born as M. N. Abraham on 30 October 1879 and was the only son of M. A. Ninan and Mariamma. His father, Ninan, was the son of Abraham of the Maret house. Mariamma was the eldest daughter of Oommachen of the Karikattu family in Eraviperoor.

Abraham was named after his paternal grandfather Abraham. He had two elder sisters. His parents called him Kochavarachen.

He was not good as a student, failing many times in his school final exam and degree examination.

== Ordination ==
M. N. Abraham and M. P. Pothen (Philipose), Velliyampallil, Mallappally, were the first Indians with university degrees to be ordained as deacons in the Malankara Mar Thoma Syrian Church. Titus II Mar Thoma ordained them on 30 April 1912.

On 5 December 1914, at his native place Eraviperoor, Deacon Abraham, and Deacon Pothen were ordained as priests. Abraham was appointed as Kayamkulam divisional secretary.

== Politics ==
The Metropolitan was a staunch nationalist who stood for the people's democratic rights. He resisted the undemocratic and dictatorial actions of Dewan Sir C. P. Ramaswami Iyer and was instrumental in getting a resolution passed by the Sabha Council (church council) condemning Sir C. P.'s move to proclaim Travancore as an independent state.

== See also ==
- Mar Thoma Church
- Throne of St. Thomas
- List of Malankara metropolitans
- Syrian Malabar Nasrani
- Saint Thomas Christians
- Christianity in India
- Malankara Metropolitan
- List of Saint Thomas Christians

== Bibliography ==
English

- Juhanon Marthoma Metropolitan. (1952). Christianity in India and a Brief History of the Marthoma Syrian Church. Pub: K.M. Cherian.
- Zac Varghese Dr. & Mathew A. Kallumpram. (2003). Glimpses of Mar Thoma Church History. London, England. ISBN 978-81-900854-4-1.
- Zac Varghese Dr. & Mathew A. Kallumpram. Metropolitan Abraham Mar Thoma. "Light of Life", Vol. 3, Issue 11, September 2004.

Malayalam.

- Eapen, Prof. Dr. K. V. (2001). Malankara Marthoma Suryani Sabha Charitram (History of Malankara Marthoma Syrian Church). Pub: Kallettu, Muttambalam, Kottayam.
- Mar Thoma Voluntary Evangelistic Association, (1998). Abraham Mar Thoma
- Mathew, N. M. Malankara Marthoma Sabha Charitram (History of the Marthoma Church), Volume I (2006), Volume II (2007), Volume III (2008). Pub. E.J. Institute, Thiruvalla.
- Varghese, (1950) Dr. Abraham Mar Thoma Metropolitan.
- Daniel, K. N. Dr. Abraham Marthoma Metropolitan – Biography. V.V. Press, Kollam. 1948.

Mar Thoma Church Titles
Preceded by Titus II Mar Thoma	XVII Mar Thoma Metropolitan of the Malankara Mar Thoma Syrian Church; 1944–1947	Succeeded by Juhanon Mar Thoma
