= Juhanon Mar Thoma =

Indian Mar Thoma Church bishop

His Beatitude The Most Reverend Aboon Dr. Juhanon Mar Thoma XVIII Mar Thoma Metropolitan
- of the Apostolic Throne of St Thomas
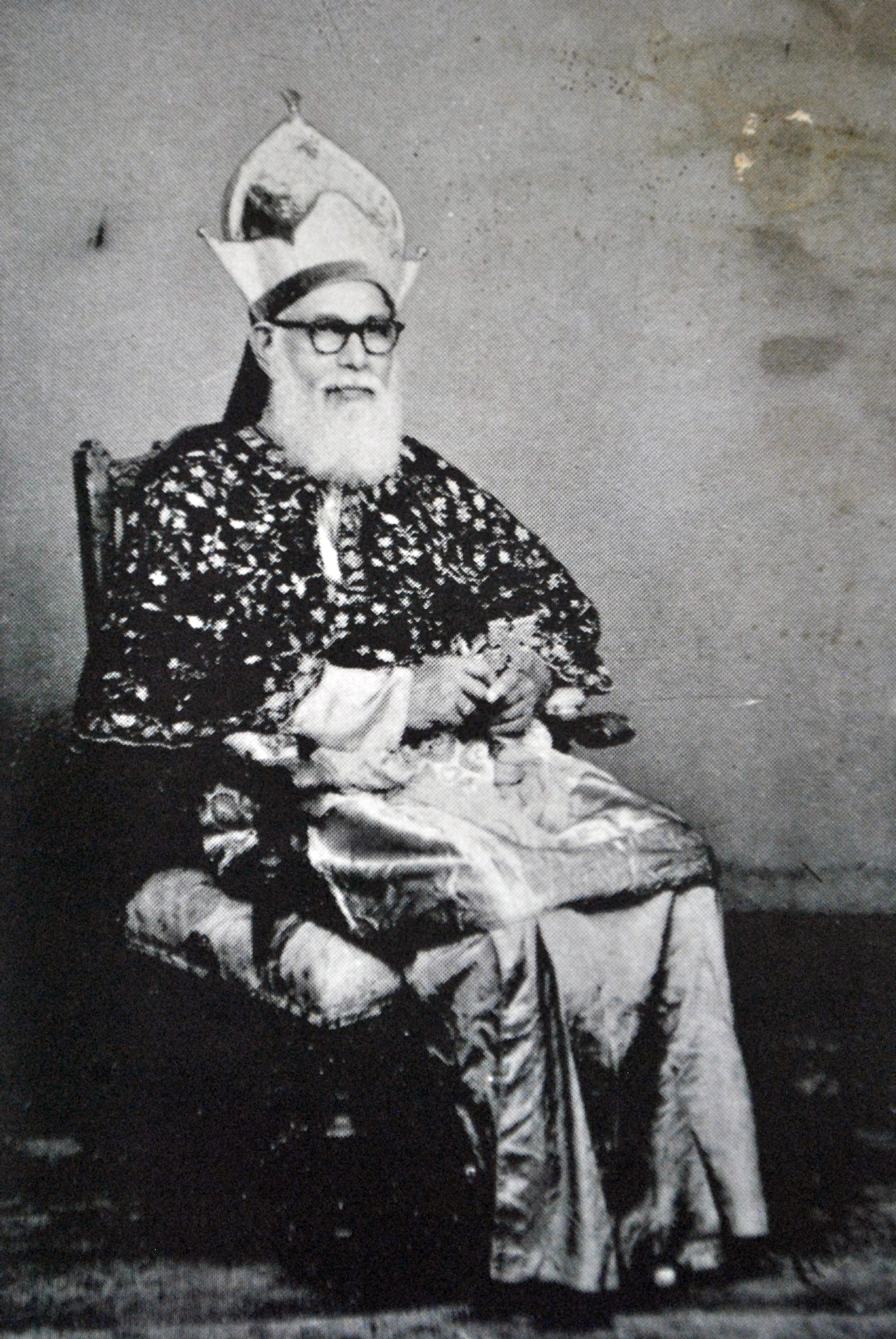
- Church: Mar Thoma Syrian Church
- Installed: 1 September 1949
- Term ended: 27 September 1976
- Predecessor: Abraham Mar Thoma
- Successor: Alexander Mar Thoma

Orders
- Ordination: 7 October 1932
- Consecration: 30 December 1937
- Rank: Mar Thoma Metropolitan (Ecclesiastical Title of the Head of the Ancient Indian Church)

Personal details
- Born: C. M. John; 7 August 1894 Ayroor
- Died: 27 September 1976 (aged 82) Kottayam
- Buried: Tiruvalla

Juhanon Mar Thoma XVIII (7 August 1894 – 27 September 1976) was the Metropolitan of the Malankara Mar Thoma Syrian Church from 1947 to 1976. He gave leadership to the church and at the same time actively participated in social and political arenas. He was respected by people from all walks of life, from all religions and from all age groups. He is remembered for providing the church with its famous motto "Lighted to Lighten". His humanistic and socially-engaged approach to the Christian faith was embodied in his personal credo: "The Church must be interested where human life is interested."

== Early life ==
Juhanon Mar Thoma was born on 7 August 1894 and was christened as C. M. John. His father was C. P. Mathew Munsiff (judge) Cherukara Paravelithundiyil, Ayroor, in Kerala. His mother was Annamma Kollenkeril, Aymanam, Kottayam. His parents called him Yohannachen. C. P. Mathew was the grandson of the sister of Mathews Mar Athanasius Metropolitan.

=== Education ===
John was educated at Kottayam M.T. Seminary High School, Thiruvananthapuram (Trivandrum) Maharaja's college, Madras Wesley College, and Madras Christian College. The stay at Madras, made changes in his attitude, outlook, and lifestyle. He was attracted to Indian Nationalism, and started to wear Khadi, following the principles of Mahatma Gandhi. He was able to meet a number of foreign missionaries that made him decide to select gospel work as his ambition.

After completing his education at Madras, he joined the United Theological College, Bangalore, and obtained BD Degree in 1922.

=== As a teacher ===
For six years after leaving Bangalore he taught at Mar Thoma Seminary High school, Kottayam. There, in addition to his teaching, he was the boarding master and Scout Master also. In 1927, John was ordained as a deacon by Titus II Mar Thoma. In 1928 he left for higher studies at Union Theological Seminary in the city of New York. After obtaining STM. degree from there, he joined Wycliffe Hall, Oxford, England. He returned to Kerala and continued to teach at Mar Thoma Seminary High school and at the Theological Seminary, Kottayam.

=== Scout leader ===
While teaching at M.T. Seminary Kottayam he was a Scoutmaster and later became the Scout commissioner. He was able to obtain Wood Badge, in Scouting. Third World Scout Jamboree was held Birkenhead, England in 1929 from 31 July to 6 August. From 70 countries about 50,000 Scouts attended. John attended this jamboree as a member of the Indian contingent. While in Canada he was also able to attend the YMCA Boys' camp held in Canada.

=== Ordination ===
John was ordained as a Kassessa/Kassesso (clergy) at Ayroor church on 7 October 1932. He was appointed as vicar of Jerusalem church, Kottayam. There he was very active and motivated the youth for the church and social work, took part in youth camps, sports, and boat races, and was able to instill in them religious and social ideals. His tireless work affected his health and he had to retreat to a sanatorium for rest and treatment.

== Consecration ==
=== Malankara throne ===
Malankara Throne

After the Koonen Cross Oath in 1653 it became necessary to appoint a bishop. For this purpose, a special chair was made and Mar Thoma I the first bishop of Malankara church was enthroned. This throne, used for the consecration of Mar Thoma I, is in the possession of the Malankara Mar Thoma Syrian Church and is kept at Tiruvalla. It has been used in the installation of every Mar Thoma Metropolitan, to this day, so that the continuity of the throne of Mar Thoma is ensured. This was the throne used for the consecration of Mar Thoma XVIII, Juhanon Mar Thoma Metropolitan.

=== Installation ===
To enhance the work of the church it was decided to consecrate two more bishops and the lot fell to John and C. T. Mathew. On 30 December 1937 both of them were consecrated at Tiruvalla. John was given the episcopal title Juhanon Mar Timotheos and Mathew was given the title Mathews Mar Athanasius. Mar Timotheos episcopa took charge of the Southern diocese.

== Mar Thoma Metropolitan ==
Abraham Mar Thoma died on 1 September 1949. Juhanon Mar Timotheos was enthroned as Metropolitan Juhanon Mar Thoma at Kozhencherry church. From 1947 to 1953 the administration of the church was reinforced by the appointment of two Diocesan Secretaries. They gave valuable service to the church and that was a great relief for the two bishops, Juhanon Mar Thoma and Mathews Mar Athanasius Episcopa.

== Three new bishops ==
During this period, members of the Mar Thoma church spread to Malaya, Singapore, and the Gulf region in addition to various parts of India. As the church was growing and the workload was increasing the Prathinidhi Mandalam (Parliament of elected members from each parish and the clergy) of the church decided to consecrate M.G. Chandy, P. Thomas, and Philip Oommen as bishops. Their consecration was held on 23 May 1953 at Tiruvalla. They were given the episcopal titles Alexander Mar Theophilus (later Alexander Mar Thoma Metropolitan), Thomas Mar Athanasius (later Suffragan Metropolitan) and Philipose Mar Chrysostem (later Philipose Mar Chrysostem Mar Thoma Metropolitan).

== Pathiopodesa Samiti and Formation of St. Thomas Evangelical Church of India. ==
Even before the consecration of the three bishops, Mr. K. N. Daniel, Kurumthottical, a renowned church historian and seminary professor criticised Juhanon Mar Thoma and accused him of going against the reformation ideals. Mr. Daniel and his followers formed an organization called Pathiopodesa Samiti (Organization for the propagation of sound doctrine). Several attempts were made for reconciliations. In 1955, Mr.K.N.Daniel filed a case against the Metropolitan. Rev. C. V. John a true friend and supporter of the Metropolitan was the co-defendant. In 1965 the supreme court of India gave the judgment in favor of the Metropolitan. In June 1960, 14 clergymen resigned and decided to leave the church. On 26 January 1961, they with their followers formed St. Thomas Evangelical Church of India.

== Consecration of bishops ==
P. T. Joseph and V. T. Koshy were consecrated bishops by Juhanon Mar Thoma in February 1975. P. T. Joseph was given the episcopal title Joseph Mar Irenaeus (Later Joseph Mar Thoma) and V. T. Koshy, Easow Mar Timotheos.

== Ecumenical efforts ==
Ecumenism was a reality for him; he restored peace with the Indian Orthodox Church. He actively participated in ecumenical councils such as the World Council of Churches. In 1948, he led the delegation to the first Assembly of the World Council of Churches in Amsterdam, and at its second meeting at Evanston, Illinois in 1954 he was elected as one of the presidents of WCC. During the third Assembly in New Delhi in 1961, he was the chairman and guided the deliberations with distinction.

It was in 1974, it was decided enter into full communion with the Churches of South India, North India and with various provinces in the Anglican communion.

== Social activities ==
On 26 June 1975 Prime Minister Indira Gandhi declared Emergency. At that time on 25 August 1976, Juhanon Mar Thoma sent a letter to the Prime Minister arguing for the restoration of democracy. He was the only Indian Christian leader to do so.

Education was also a major interest for the Metropolitan. He established four institutions of higher education. In 1974, Mar Thoma Theological Seminary was upgraded to a BD Undergraduate college affiliated to the Serampore University.

Hospitals and social welfare institutions were opened during his lifetime. Realizing the pain of a family without a house of their own, he introduced the idea of building houses for the poor and providing land by the landless even in 1949. In 1967, before moving to the new residence built for the Metropolitan (known as Poolatheen), he made it a point to present a house to a poor homeless TB patient who was a non-Christian. For many years he served as the President of Ayroor Pakalomattam Thazhamon Family. He was a philanthropist and an advocate of justice.

Juhanon Mar Thoma died on 27 September 1976 at Kottayam. The funeral service was held St. Thomas Church in Tiruvalla. A huge crowd was present to bid farewell to their beloved Metropolitan. He was interred in the Bishops' cemetery in the SCS Compound, Tiruvalla.

Mar Thoma Church Titles
Preceded by Abraham Mar Thoma	XVIII Mar Thoma Metropolitan of the Malankara Mar Thoma Syrian Church; 1947–1976	Succeeded by Alexander Mar Thoma

== See also ==
- Throne of St. Thomas
- Mar Thoma Church
- Syrian Malabar Nasrani
- Saint Thomas Christians
- Christianity in India
- List of Saint Thomas Christians
- List of Malankara metropolitans

== Bibliography ==
English.

  1. Juhanon Mar Thoma Metropolitan, The Most Rev. Dr. (1952). Christianity in India and a Brief History of the Marthoma Syrian Church. Pub: K.M. Cherian.
  2. Zac Varghese Dr. & Mathew A. Kallumpram. (2003). Glimpses of Mar Thoma Church History. London, England. ISBN 8190085441.
  3. Zac Varghese Dr. & Mathew A. Kallumpram. Metropolitan Juhanon Mar Thoma. "Light of Life", Vol. 3, Issue 7, July 2004.

Malayalam.

  1. Alexander Mar Thoma (1977). Dr. Juhanon Mar Thoma, Jeevithaum Sandessavum (Life and Message of Dr.Juhanon Mar Thoma). Pub: Mar Thoma Church.
  2. Eapen, Prof. Dr. K. V. (2001). Malankara Marthoma Suryani Sabha Charitram (History of Malankara Marthoma Syrian Church). Pub: Kallettu, Muttambalam, Kottayam.
  3. Mathew, N. M. Malankara Marthoma Sabha Charitram (History of the Marthoma Church), Volume II (2007) and Volume III (2008). Pub. E.J.Institute, Tiruvalla.
