= Ayiroor, Pathanamthitta =

Ayroor ‍
- Village
- Location in Kerala, India Ayroor (India)
- Coordinates: 9°22′0″N 76°43′0″E
- Country: India
- State: Kerala
- District: Pathanamthitta

Languages
  - Official: Malayalam, English
- Time zone: UTC+5:30 (IST)
- PIN: 689611/689612
- Telephone code: 04735/0469
- Vehicle registration: KL-03/KL 62
- Nearest city: Thiruvalla
- Literacy: 97%
- Lok Sabha constituency: Pathanamthitta

Ayroor (also spelled Ayiroor) is a village near Thiruvalla, located in the western part of Ranni taluk, in Thiruvalla Revenue Division of the Pathanamthitta district in Kerala state, India. It is bordered by hills and located near the Western Ghats. Ayroor was previously part of Thiruvalla taluk in Alappuzha district and is considered part of the Edanadu region in Kerala. The Pamba River flows on the southern side of the village.

== Tourism ==
The Pamba River and the surrounding hills make Ayiroor a picturesque location in central Travancore. Residents of Ayiroor cultivate coconut, rubber, cocoa, tapioca, plantains, cinnamon, pepper, nutmeg, vanilla, rambutan and other crops, making the per capita income of the residents higher than the state average. The nearest airports are the Cochin International Airport, located 127 kilometers away, and Thiruvananthapuram International Airport, 120 kilometers away.

One of the highlights of Ayroor is the Cherukolpuzha Hindu Parishad, a religious festival that is held for a week in February. Every year since 1912, the festival is held on the dry bed of the Pamba River. Snake boat races also attract people to the village.

== Religion ==
Hinduism and Christianity are the only religions in the region, with a similar number of followers.

Ayroor village used to be a part of the erstwhile Kingdom of Travancore. It is believed that the Kovilans ruled Ayroor in the past.

The prominent Nair families are Thottavallil and Pulluvizha. The branches of these families are mostly in Thadiyoor and Ayroor areas. Thadiyoor Market is a private market running by the Thottavallil Family Trust. Former Travancore Devaswom Board President Shri T.N Upendranatha Kurup is the head of the family of Thottavallil. He is the president of Hindumatha Mahamandalam [Ayroor Cherukolepuzha Hindumatha Convention Trust]. His father is late. Shri. Pulluvizha Krishnapanicker belongs to the Pulluvizha family, and her mother belongs to the Thottavallil family.

It is believed that the Thekencore kingdom's Kovilans ruled Ayroor in the past. The Kovilans brought a Christian family from the north, as they believed that the kingdom will become prosperous with the presence of Christians. The descendants of this family are still present in Ayroor and are known as the Ayyakkavil family.

== Notable people ==
- K. Surendranatha Thilakan (1935–2012), actor and playwright
- The Most Rev. Dr. *Juhanon Mar Thoma Metropolitan (1894–1976)
- The Most Rev. Mathews Athanasius the Malankara Metropolitan (1907–1973)
- T. K. A. Nair (born 1939), former civil servant
- Ayroor Vasudeva Kurup Vanchipattu Singer

== Main attractions ==
- Ayroor Chathayam Boat Race
- Cherukolpuzha Hindu Matha Maha Mandalam (Convention)

== See also ==
- Pathanamthitta
- Thiruvalla
- Ranni
