= List of Nair Service Society educational institutions =

This is the list of Educational Institutions of Nair Service Society

== Colleges ==
=== Arts and science colleges ===
Name	Established	Location	Type
Velu Thampi Memorial N.S.S. College, Dhanuvachapuram	1964	Thiruvananthapuram	Aided
Maharani Sethu Parvathibhai N.S.S. Women's College, Thiruvanathapuram	1950	Thiruvananthapuram	Aided
Mahatma Gandhi College, Thiruvananthapuram	1948	Thiruvananthapuram	Aided
N.S.S. College, Nilamel	1964	Kollam	Aided
Mannam Memorial N.S.S. College, Kottiyam	1964	Kollam	Aided
N. S. S. College, Pandalam	1950	Pandalam	Aided
N.S.S. College, Cherthala	1964	Cherthala	Aided
N.S.S. Hindu College, Changanacherry	1947	Changanacherry	Aided
Sree Vidhyadhi Raja N.S.S. College, Vazhoor	1965	Kottayam	Aided
Nss College Rajakumari	1995	Rajakumari	Aided
Sree Vyasa N.S.S. College, Wadakkancherry	1967	Wadakkancherry	Aided
NSS College, Ottapalam	1962	Ottappalam	Aided
NSS College, Nenmara	1967	Nenmara	Aided
N. S. S. College, Manjeri	1965	Manjeri	Aided
Pazhassi Raja N.S.S. College, Mattannur	1964	Mattannur	Aided
N.S.S. Arts and Science College, Parakkulam	2016	Parakkulam	Aided

=== Training colleges ===
Name	Established	Location	Type
N.S.S. Training College, Pandalam	1957	Pandalam	Aided
N.S.S. Training College, Changanacherry	1954	Changanacherry	Aided
N.S.S. Training College, Ottappalam	1960	Ottappalam	Aided
N.S.S. Co-operative Training College, Kottayam	1961	Kottayam	Co-Operative

=== Other colleges ===
Polytechnic College
Serial no	Name	Established	Location	Type
1	N.S.S. Polytechnic College, Pandalam	1958	Pandalam	Aided

Engineering College
Serial no	Name	Established	Location	Type
1	N S S College of Engineering	1960	Palakkad	Aided

Medical College
Serial no	Name	Established	Location	Type
1	Athurasramam N.S.S. Homoeo Medical College, Sachivothamapuram	1958	Kurichy	Aided
2	Mannam Ayurveda Co-operative Medical College, Pandalam	2005	Pandalam	Private

Law College
Serial no	Name	Established	Location	Type
1	N.S.S. Law College, Kottiyam	2012	Kottiyam	Private

== Schools ==
=== High schools - Day Schools ===
Name	Location	Type
N.S.S.High Schools, Chowallor	Neyyattinkara	Aided
N.S.S.High Schools, Palode	Pacha	Aided
N.S.S.High Schools, Kattoor	Kozhencherry	Aided
N.S.S.High Schools, Vallicode-Kottayam	Vallicode-Kottayam	Aided
N.S.S.High Schools, Makkapuzha	Makkapuzha	Aided
N.S.S.High Schools, Perayam	Mulavana	Aided
N.S.S.High Schools, Pandalam (Boys)	Pandalam	Aided
N.S.S.High Schools, Thattayil	Thattayil	Aided
N.S.S.High Schools, Edanad-Chengannur	Chengannur	Aided
N.S.S.High Schools, Kudassanad	Kudassanad	Aided
N.S.S.High Schools, Kurathikkad	Kurathikkad	Aided
N.S.S.High Schools, Perumpulickal	Perumpulickal	Aided
N.S.S.High Schools, Karuvatta (Girls)	Karuvatta	Aided
N.S.S.High Schools, Eara	Neelamperoor	Aided
N.S.S.High Schools, Vaipur	Mallappally	Aided
N.S.S.High Schools, Muthoor	Thiruvalla	Aided
N.S.S.High Schools, Veliyanad	Veliyanad	Aided
N.S.S.High Schools, Kunnam	Kunnam	Aided
N.S.S.High Schools, Othera	Othera	Aided
N.S.S.High Schools, Perunna (Boys)	Perunna	Aided
N.S.S.High Schools, Chingavanam	Chingavanam	Aided
N.S.S.High Schools, Thalanad	Thalanad	Aided
N.S.S.High Schools, Karukachal (Girls)	Karukachal	Aided
N.S.S.High Schools, Kezhuvamkulam	Kezhuvamkulam	Aided
N.S.S.High Schools, Vechoor	Vechoor	Aided
N.S.S.High Schools, Kattampack	Kattampack	Aided
N.S.S.High Schools, Manjoor	Manjoor	Aided
N.S.S.High School, Ottapalam	Ottapalam	Aided
N.S.S.High Schools, Edanad	Edanad	Aided
N.S.S.High Schools, Koottar	Koottar	Aided
N.S.S.High Schools, Moovattupuzha	Moovattupuzha	Aided
N.S.S.High Schools, Danuvachapuram (Girls)	Danuvachapuram	Aided
N.S.S.High Schools, Manickamangalam (Boys)	Manickamangalam	Aided
N.S.S.High Schools, Mundathikode	Mundathikode	Aided
N.S.S.High Schools, Mulloorkkara	Mulloorkkara	Aided
N.S.S.High Schools, Palkulangara	Palkulangara	Aided
N.S.S.High Schools, Akathethara	Akathethara	Aided
N.S.S.High Schools, Vengassery	Vengassery	Aided
N.S.S.High Schools, Alakode	Alakode	Aided
N.S.S.High Schools, Manickamangalam (Girls)	Manickamangalam	Aided
N.S.S.High Schools, Mannoor	Mannoor	Aided
N.S.S.High Schools, Sasthamangalam	Sasthamangalam	Aided
N.S.S.High Schools, Adoor	Adoor	Aided
N.S.S.High Schools, Prakulam	Prakulam	Aided
N.S.S.High Schools, Chathanoor	Chathanoor	Aided
N.S.S.High Schools, Karikode	Karikode	Aided
N.S.S.High Schools, Panavally	Panavally	Aided
N.S.S.High Schools, Kaviyoor	Kaviyoor	Aided
N.S.S.High Schools, Kunnamthanam	Kunnamthanam	Aided
N.S.S.High Schools, Ramankary	Ramankary	Aided
N.S.S.High Schools, Perunna (Girls)	Perunna	Aided
N.S.S.High Schools, Anickad	Anickad	Aided
N.S.S.High Schools, Karukachal (Boys)	Karukachal	Aided
N.S.S.High Schools, Vazhoor	Vazhoor	Aided
N.S.S.High Schools, Kallara	Kallara	Aided
N.S.S.High Schools, Kidangoor	Kidangoor	Aided
N.S.S.High Schools, Manakkad	Manakkad	Aided
N.S.S.High Schools, Varappetty	Varappetty	Aided
N.S.S.High Schools, Parakkadavu	Parakkadavu	Aided
N.S.S.High Schools, Pandalam (Boys)	Pandalam	Aided
N.S.S.High Schools, Kesavadasapuram	Kesavadasapuram	Aided
N.S.S.High Schools, Karuvatta (Girls)	Karuvatta	Aided
N.S.S.High Schools, Choorakode	Choorakode	Aided

=== Higher Secondary Schools - Day Schools ===
Name	Location	Type
N.S.S.H.S.S, Sasthamangalam	Sasthamangalam	Aided
N.S.S.H.S.S, Chathanoor	Chathanoor	Aided
N.S.S.H.S.S, Karuvatta	Karuvatta	Aided
N.S.S.H.S.S, Adoor	Adoor	Aided
N.S.S.H.S.S, Thadiyoor	Thadiyoor	Aided
N.S.S.H.S.S, Ramankary	Ramankary	Aided
N.S.S.H.S.S, Perunnai	Perunna	Aided
N.S.S.H.S.S, Kunnamthanam	Kunnamthanam	Aided
N.S.S.H.S.S, Kallara	Kallara	Aided
N.S.S.H.S.S, Varappetty	Varappetty	Aided
N.S.S.H.S.S, Karukachal	Karukachal	Aided
N.S.S.H.S.S, Manakkad	Manakkad	Aided
N.S.S.H.S.S, KOOTTAR	Koottar	Aided
N.S.S.H.S.S, Danuvachapuram	Danuvachapuram	Aided
N.S.S.H.S.S, Palkulangara	Palkulangara	Aided
N.S.S.H.S.S, Karikode	Karikode	Aided
N.S.S.H.S.S, Prakulam	Prakulam	Aided
N.S.S.H.S.S, Choorakode	Choorakode	Aided
N.S.S.H.S.S, Kaviyoor	Kaviyoor	Aided
N.S.S.H.S.S, Kavalam	Kavalam	Aided
N.S.S.H.S.S, Panavally	Panavally	Aided
N.S.S.H.S.S, Anickad	Anickad	Aided
N.S.S.H.S.S, Vazhoor	Vazhoor	Aided
N.S.S.H.S.S, Kidangoor	Kidangoor	Aided
N.S.S.H.S.S, Parakkadavu	Parakkadavu	Aided
N.S.S.H.S.S, Kesavadasapuram	Kesavadasapuram	Aided
N.S.S.H.S.S, Pandalam	Pandalam	Aided
N.S.S.H.S.S, Manickamangalam	Manickamangalam	Aided
N.S.S.H.S.S, Mundathikode	Mundathikode	Aided
N.S.S.H.S.S, Kottayam	Kottayam	Aided
N.S.S.H.S.S, Alakode	Alakode	Aided
N.S.S.H.S.S, Thattayil	Thattayil	Aided
M.M.R.H.S.S, Neeramankara	Neeramankara	Private
N.S.S EM H.S.S, Kalpetta	Wayanad district	Private

=== Vocational higher secondary schools ===
Name	Location	Type
N.S.S. V.H.S.S, Ottappalam	Ottappalam	Aided
N.S.S. V.H.S.S, Perunnahi	Perunna	Aided
