= Socialist Republican Party (Kerala) =

- Abbreviation: SRP
- Founder: P. S. Velayudhan; N. Sreenivasan
- Founded: 13 March 1975; 51 years ago 2015 (Reconstituted)
- Dissolved: 1996
- Headquarters: State Committee Office, Tutor’s Lane, Statue, Trivandrum
- Ideology: Socialism
- ECI status: Registered Unrecognised Party

The Socialist Republican Party (SRP) was an Indian political party from the state of Kerala.

== History ==
The council of SNDP Yogam decided to form a political party on 1974 November, on the basis of that decision the party was formed and declared in 1975 March 13 with the blessings of the SNDP Yogam, with an intention of the upliftment of backwards, dalits and minorities to establish social justice by providing Democratic, Socialist, Casteless and Classless and Secular pattern of Society. The party was created as an answer to the formation of the National Democratic Party by the Nair Service Society.

The party had entered into the agitation for the implementation of Mandal commission report for the establishment of communal reservation.

The party was a member of Kerala's United Democratic Front during the 1980s.

The party achieved early success. In the 1982 Elections, the party secured two assembly seats and a minister. the members of Kerala legislative Assembly representing SRP where Justice N Sreenivasan representing Kottayam assembly Constituency and T. V. Vijayarajan representing Karunagapally assembly Constituency, later C G Janardhanan representing Kodakara assembly Constituency joined with SRP.

Shri. N. Sreenivasan, renowned leader of SRP and SNDP, become the minister for excise representing party in the ministry headed by Karunakaran.

A retired District Judge who had been President of SNDP Yogam for over six years and was also the Chairman of S.R.P. for seven years. Shri. N. Sreenivasan became elected to the Kerala Legislative Assembly in 1982 from Kottayam constituency, held the portfolio of excise minister in the ministry headed by K Karunakaran.

During 1986, the Socialist Republican Party split into two factions - SRP(V) and SRP(S). In the Election of 1987, neither fraction was able to win a seat. SRP and NDP disappeared as political entities by 1996.

== 1996-2011('Dark Era') ==
The functions of SRP had been in idle status from 1996 to 2011 under the leadership of S Ranjith. (which is now known as the "dark era of SRP") the party is kept idle by the Ranjith in order to protect the interests of SNDP yogam general secretary Vellapally Nadesan and his son Thushar Vellappaly

== After 2011 ==
In 2011, A group of socialists under the leadership of O V Sreedath, who had been the former state secretary of Kerala State Committee of Janatha Dal (S), joined the party. He was later nominated as the Vice Chairman of SRP. At the 8th party conference of SRP, conducted at Ernakulam Shikshak Sadan on 19 May 2013, Sreedath was elected as working chairman of the party and Ranjith continued as general secretary.

In the 2014 general election the party had contested from Ernakulam Lok Sabha Constituency and from Thiruvananthapuram Lok Sabha Constituency; the party achieved 6156 votes from Ernakulam Lok Sabha Constituency despite the party not having a booth committee.

After the formation of BDJS, Ranjith demanded for the merging of SRP with BDJS. However, this proposal was rejected by Sreedath, causing a rift within the party and various legal issues.

On 13 October 2019, the 9th party state conference was contested at Kozhikode EMS indoor stadium. The conference had elected O V Sreedath as the general secretary of the party.

On 9 February 2025, the 10th party state conference was contested at the Thiruvananthapuram Poorna Auditorium. The conference had elected O V Sreedath as the general secretary of the party as its life time secretary.
