= Changanassery Parameswaran Pillai =

Social reformer, lawyer and judge

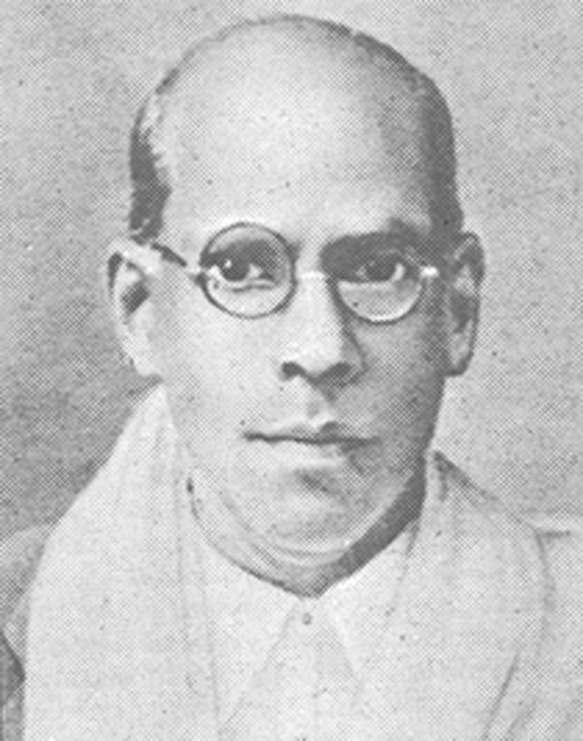
- Born: March 1877; Changanassery, Kingdom of Travancore
- Died: 30 June 1940 (aged 63)
- Other name: Changanassery
- Education: B.A., LL.B.
- Occupations: Lawyer, judge, social reformer, politician
- Known for: President of Nair Service Society; Travancore High Court Judge; Leader of Savarna Jatha
- Predecessor: K. Kelappan (as NSS President)
- Political party: Indian National Congress
- Movement: Indian independence movement Vaikom Satyagraha; Anti-untouchability movement
- Parent(s): Vazhappilly Narayana Pillai; Narayani Amma

Changanassery Parameswaran Pillai (March 1877 – 30 June 1940), popularly known as Changanassery, was an Indian social reformer, lawyer, judge, attorney general and freedom fighter from the Kingdom of Travancore. He served as the second president of the Nair Service Society (NSS) from 1917 to 1928 and was one of its co-founders. He was elected four times to the Sree Moolam Popular Assembly and served as a member of the Travancore Legislative Council. A prominent figure in the Vaikom Satyagraha, he led the delegation that presented a memorial signed by over 25,000 upper-caste Hindus to the Regent Maharani Sethu Lakshmi Bayi, demanding the abolition of untouchability. He worked closely with Mahatma Gandhi during the latter's visits to Travancore and served as the Central Committee member of the Harijan Seva Sangham and Chairman of its Kerala branch.

== Early life and education ==
Pillai was born in March 1877 in Changanassery, in the Kingdom of Travancore (present-day Kottayam district, Kerala). His father was Vazhappilly Narayana Pillai from Vadakkekara Puthukutty house and his mother was Narayani Amma from Manakkat House.

He received his primary education at schools in Vazhappally and Changanassery. He went on to complete a Bachelor of Arts degree and subsequently studied law, passing the LL.B. examination. He was influenced in his early years by the social reform activities of C. Krishna Pillai (1851–1916), the pioneer Nair reformer known as Samudayouthejakan (Stimulator of the community), and became one of his prominent disciples alongside Mannathu Padmanabhan and Swadeshabhimani Ramakrishna Pillai.

== Legal and legislative career ==
=== Legal practice ===
After completing his legal education, Pillai began practising law and established himself as a prominent advocate. He practised for two years at the Travancore High Court and was one of the founders of the Kollam Bar Association.

=== Member of the Sree Moolam Popular Assembly ===
Pillai was elected to the Sree Moolam Popular Assembly, the first popularly elected legislature in the history of India, and served as a member from 1906 to 1913. He was elected to the Assembly a total of four times during his career. He used his position in the legislature to advocate for civil liberties, accountability of the Travancore government, and reform of the marumakkathayam (matrilineal) system of inheritance that prevailed among the Nairs.

=== Member of the Travancore Legislative Council ===
In 1913, Pillai became a member of the Travancore Legislative Council, the upper house of the Travancore legislature, a position he held until 1927. During this period, he played a key role in the passage of the Nair Regulation Act of 1912, having introduced a bill suggesting the partition of thavazhis (matrilineal branches within the tharavad joint family). This was the first legislative measure addressing the matrilineal system among the Nairs, though it provided only for thavazhi partition and was considered insufficient by many progressive leaders.

=== High Court Judge ===
In 1926, Pillai was appointed as a judge of the Travancore High Court. He served on the bench for six years before resigning from the judiciary to re-enter public life and political activity. After his resignation, the government cancelled his pension on political grounds as retribution for his continued involvement in political agitation.

== Social reform activities ==
=== Nair Service Society ===
Pillai was one of the co-founders of the Nair Service Society (NSS), which was established on 31 October 1914 by a group of reformers led by Mannathu Padmanabhan at Perunna in Changanassery. The organisation was initially called the Nair Samudaya Bruthya Jana Sangha and was renamed the Nair Service Society on 11 July 1915. K. Kelappan served as the founding president and Mannathu Padmanabhan as the founding secretary.

Pillai succeeded Kelappan as the second president of the NSS and held the position from 1917 to 1928. Under his presidency, the NSS grew into a powerful organisation that fought against caste discrimination, untouchability, the joint family system, and expensive social customs such as Talikettu Kalyanam (symbolic pre-puberty marriage), Therandukuli (menstruation rituals), and Pulikudi. The NSS also established its first school in 1915 at Karukachaal near Changanassery, beginning a network of educational institutions that would eventually span the entire state.

One of Pillai's foremost accomplishments as NSS president was his role in the passage of the Nair Regulation Acts. The first Nair Act of 1912 provided only for thavazhi partition, which was considered inadequate by progressive reformers. Under continued pressure from Pillai and other NSS leaders, a more comprehensive Nair Act was passed in 1925 that provided for individual partition of tharavad property, made polygamy illegal, and prohibited the marriage of females under the age of 16, effectively ending the talikettu custom.

=== Anti-untouchability movement and the Vaikom Satyagraha ===
Pillai played a leading role in the struggle against untouchability in Travancore. He was one of the key leaders of the Vaikom Satyagraha (1924–1925), a landmark nonviolent movement demanding the right of lower-caste Hindus to use public roads around the Vaikom Mahadeva Temple.

A significant development during the Vaikom Satyagraha was the Savarna Jatha (upper-caste march), organised at the suggestion of Mahatma Gandhi. On 1 November 1924, Mannathu Padmanabhan led a procession of about five hundred upper-caste Hindus from Vaikom to Trivandrum to express solidarity with the satyagrahis and to submit a memorandum to the Regent Maharani. The marchers received rousing receptions along the way, halted at Sivagiri to receive the blessings of Sree Narayana Guru, and by the time they reached Trivandrum on 12 November 1924, the procession had swelled to nearly 5,000 men.

On 13 November 1924, a delegation headed by Changanassery Parameswaran Pillai met the Regent Maharani Sethu Lakshmi Bayi and presented a memorial signed by more than 25,000 upper-caste Hindus requesting that all roads and public institutions be opened to all classes of people regardless of caste or creed. Although the Maharani responded that the issue would need to be decided by the legislature, the memorial represented a powerful statement of upper-caste support for the abolition of untouchability.

Pillai also had an understanding with W. H. Pitt, the Commissioner of Police of Travancore, through which the government agreed to open the disputed roads after the cessation of the satyagraha. The Vaikom Satyagraha eventually concluded on 23 November 1925, with the approach roads on three sides of the temple being opened to all Hindus.

=== Kallamaala Samaram ===
Pillai was also involved in the resolution of the Kallamaala Samaram (Stone Necklace Protest), a social uprising by the Pulayar community that took place in October 1915 at Perinad and nearby villages in Kollam district. On 21 December 1915, a meeting was convened under the joint chairmanship of Ayyankali, Changanassery Parameswaran Pillai, and British officials at Peeranki Maidan, bringing together the conflicting groups. At this meeting, women of the Pulaya community threw away their kallamaala (stone bead necklaces that symbolised their enslaved status) and proclaimed that they would henceforth wear only gold or metal ornaments.

=== Harijan welfare ===
Pillai served as the Central Committee member of the Harijan Seva Sangham, the organisation founded by Mahatma Gandhi for the welfare of Harijans (oppressed castes), and was the Chairman of its Kerala branch. Through his efforts, 82 Harijan offices were established across Kerala.

== Association with Mahatma Gandhi ==
Pillai worked closely with Mahatma Gandhi during the latter's visits to Travancore. He owned a Rolls-Royce motor car which Gandhi used for his travels across the kingdom during his visits in 1925, 1934, and 1937.

During Gandhi's first visit in March 1925 in connection with the Vaikom Satyagraha, Pillai accompanied him on a journey from Thiruvananthapuram to Kottayam on 15 March 1925, travelling through Kazhakkoottam, Attingal, Kundara, Kottarakkara, Adoor, Pandalam, Chengannur, Thiruvalla, and Changanassery. Gandhi also used the car to travel to the southernmost parts of Travancore.

The same car was used during Gandhi's 1934 tour. After the inauguration of Aanandasramam in Changanassery on 19 January 1934, Gandhi visited Panmana and Adoor in Pillai's car. Pillai's driver always drove the vehicle during these tours.

== Political career ==
=== Travancore State Congress ===
Pillai also served as the President of the Kerala Karshaka Sangh Committee (Kerala Agricultural Farmers Association).

In 1937, Pillai served as the Thiruvananthapuram regional president of the Indian National Congress. In 1938, when the branch of the Indian National Congress was formally established in Travancore at Thiruvananthapuram, Pillai was selected as its first president, with G. Ramachandran serving as the first secretary.

Following the Haripura Conference of the All India Congress Committee in February 1938, which decided that Congress committees in the princely states should not be directly involved in political movements but should instead encourage independent political organisations, a separate party was formed. C. V. Narayana Pillai, an advocate in Thiruvananthapuram, and V. Kunhiraman presided over the formation of the Travancore State Congress, with Pattom A. Thanu Pillai as its president and P. Nataraj Pillai as its secretary. This new organisation took on the task of agitating for responsible government in Travancore.

== Death and legacy ==
Changanassery Parameswaran Pillai died on 30 June 1940 at the age of 63.

He is remembered as one of the key figures in the social and political transformation of modern Travancore. Along with Mannathu Padmanabhan and other NSS leaders such as Ambalappattu Damodara Asan and Kalathil Velayudhan Nair, he helped transform the Nair Service Society into a powerful organisation for community reform. His role in the Vaikom Satyagraha and his efforts to dismantle the caste system and the matrilineal joint family system left a lasting impact on Kerala society.

A memorial library called Changanassery Smaraka Granthasala was founded in his honour in Kollam district.

A biography titled Changanassery Parameswaran Pillai was written by C. Narayana Pillai B.A., B.L., and a scholarly study of his life and contributions was published by K. R. Ushakumari in 2009 under the title Changanassery Parameswaran Pillai and the Socio Political Evolution of Modern Travancore.

== See also ==
- Nair Service Society
- Vaikom Satyagraha
- Mannathu Padmanabha Pillai
- C. Krishna Pillai
- K. Kelappan
- Sree Moolam Popular Assembly
- Kallumala Samaram
- Marumakkathayam
