= Punnoose =

Punnoose is the Syriac-Malayalam version of Stephen. Derived from Esthapannose, another less used variant of it is Pannose. As a first name not often used recently, it is often mistaken as a surname due to the practice of many Syriac Christians of Kerala using their father's first name as their surname in modern times. Notable people who use it as a surname include:

- Jacob Punnoose, police official
- Jijo Punnoose, Indian film director, producer and actor
- Maliampurackal Chacko Punnoose (1924–2012), Indian film producer, director, and entrepreneur
- P.T. Punnoose (1911–1971), Indian politician
- Rosamma Punnoose (1913–2013), Indian independence activist, politician, and lawyer
