= C. Krishna Pillai =

Indian educator

Samudayothejakan C. Krishna Pillai
- Born: 1851; Karamana, Thiruvananthapuram, Kingdom of Travancore
- Died: 8 July 1916 (aged 64–65)
- Other name: CKP
- Education: Bachelor of Arts
- Alma mater: Maharaja's College, Thiruvananthapuram (present-day University College Thiruvananthapuram)
- Occupations: Headmaster, Range Inspector of Schools
- Known for: Social reform of the Nair community; founder of Malayali Sabha, Travancore Nayar Samajam, and Keraleeya Nair Samaj; publisher of Samudaya Parishkarini
- Parent: Kunchukkali Pillai (father)

C. Krishna Pillai (1851 – 8 July 1916), popularly known by his initials CKP, was an Indian social reformer, educator, and community organiser in the princely state of Travancore. He is honoured with the title Samudayothejakan (Malayalam: സമുദായോത്തേജകൻ, meaning "Stimulator of the Community" or "Community Lifter") for his pioneering efforts over nearly half a century to reform and uplift the Nair community of Kerala.

Through his founding of organisations such as the Malayali Social Union, the Malayali Sabha, the Travancore Nayar Samajam, and the Keraleeya Nair Samaj, Pillai campaigned against caste-based educational restrictions, the matrilineal system of inheritance, child marriage, polygamy, polyandry, and subcaste-based social exclusion. His organisational groundwork and mentorship of younger leaders such as Mannath Padmanabhan directly paved the way for the formation of the Nair Service Society (NSS) in 1914.

== Early life and education ==
C. Krishna Pillai was born in 1851 at Karamana, on the outskirts of Thiruvananthapuram (Trivandrum), in the princely state of Travancore. His father was Kunchukkali Pillai. He received elementary education in Malayalam and arithmetic as a child. At the age of twelve, he obtained a position as a clerk, where his diligence and ability impressed his employer, leading to a subsequent appointment as an accountant.

In those days, English-medium education was largely the preserve of Brahmins and other high-caste aristocrats in Travancore. Pillai's early talent was recognised by Municiff Attukal Sankara Pillai, who was struck by the young man's eloquence at a prayer meeting held at the residence of Dewan Bahadur A. Govinda Pillai. With this encouragement, Pillai was able to attend the Government High School and subsequently the Maharaja's College (the present-day University College Thiruvananthapuram). He passed the Bachelor of Arts examination creditably in 1875.

== Career in education ==
Following his graduation, Pillai joined the Education Department of the Travancore government. He was appointed Headmaster of the Trivandrum Central Vernacular School at Chalai. He was later promoted to the post of Inspector of Schools in 1880.

While serving as Inspector, Pillai attempted to extend the activities of his social organisations across the state. The Dewan Rama Rao, viewing Pillai's social activism with displeasure, transferred him to distant stations such as Kottayam and Mavelikkara in an effort to curtail his influence in Trivandrum. However, these transfers proved to be a "blessing in disguise," as Pillai used each posting to establish new branches of the Malayali Sabha in Central and North Travancore.

Pillai's official career came to a close in 1906 with his retirement as Range Inspector of Schools. His retirement freed him to devote all his energies to social reform work for the remaining decade of his life.

== Social and political context ==
=== Brahmin dominance in Travancore ===
The early nineteenth century in Travancore was characterised by Brahmin dominance across the administration. Colonel John Munro, the only Resident Dewan of Travancore (1810–1814), had initiated a policy of appointing Tamil Brahmins and Tulu Brahmins to senior government posts, particularly the position of Dewan. This period, often referred to as the "Rao period" of Travancore history, saw non-Brahmin communities systematically excluded from positions of influence. It was against this backdrop that Pillai began his efforts to improve the condition of the Nairs through education and organised agitation.

=== Social evils among the Nairs ===
The Nair community in the late nineteenth century was beset by numerous social disabilities. The Marumakkathayam (matrilineal) system of succession and inheritance meant that a man's wife and children had no legal claim to his wealth or property, which instead passed through the maternal line to his nephews. In practice, however, the Karanavar (eldest male head of the taravad) and his immediate family appropriated the gains from the administration of joint family property, creating resentment between generations.

The institution of subcaste further compounded these difficulties, perpetuating social exclusiveness and preventing social mobility. Neither intermarriage nor interdining was permitted between members of various Nair subcastes and subgroups. These communities also suffered from economic impoverishment due to the observance of expensive and irrational social customs such as Talikettu Kalyanam (a pre-puberty marriage ceremony), Tirandukuli (menstruation-related social taboos), child marriage, polygamy, and polyandry.

The aristocratic sections of the Nair community benefited from these customs and practices, while the poorer and less influential members suffered greatly. It was this disparity that motivated Pillai's lifelong campaign for social reform.

== Organisational work ==
=== Malayali Social Union and Malayali Sabha ===
As a student at the Maharaja's College in Trivandrum, Pillai observed that many young Nair men who came to the city for higher education could not afford accommodation and sometimes went without food for days. Recognising the urgent need for a support structure, he organised the Malayali Social Union in 1877 at the college. The union served as a meeting ground and mutual-aid centre for students coming from outside Trivandrum. Professors John Ross and Dr. Harvey, successive Principals of the college, encouraged and supported Pillai's initiative.

In 1886, the Malayali Social Union was reorganised as the Malayali Sabha, with the broader aims of encouraging deserving students, establishing educational institutions, and promoting social welfare. The Sabha received the patronage of Maharaja Ayilyam Tirunal Rama Varma (r. 1860–1880) and rapidly expanded its activities to Central and North Travancore. At its peak, the Malayali Sabha was a powerful organisation boasting 890 members, 25 schools, and 14 branch associations across the state.

The Sabha also launched a newspaper called The Malayali, edited by C. V. Raman Pillai (1858–1922), the noted Malayalam novelist and member of the Travancore court, who also served as Secretary of the Malayali Sabha.

Under Pillai's leadership, the Malayali Sabha organised agitations demanding the admission of Nair students to the Sanskrit School, from which they had been excluded on the grounds that they were Shudras.

=== Travancore Nayar Samajam ===
When Pillai was transferred to North Travancore by the government as retaliation for his social activism, he founded the Travancore Nayar Samajam in 1903. Unlike the Malayali Sabha, which had admitted members from all communities, the Samajam was exclusively for Nairs. Its members accepted no benefits or offices of profit from the government, dedicating themselves solely to championing the cause of the Nair community. Within a short period, the Samajam enrolled 380 members with 12 units across the state.

=== Keraleeya Nair Samaj and Nair Conferences ===
In January 1905, a compromise was effected between the Malayali Sabha and the Travancore Nayar Samajam, uniting them into a single body called the Keraleeya Nair Samaj (Kerala Nair Society) to strengthen the cause of the Nair community.

In October 1905, a full-fledged Nair Conference was held at Trivandrum under Pillai's chairmanship. This was a landmark event in the history of Nair social organisation. A second Nair Conference followed in October 1907, presided over by Sir M. Krishna Nair, who later served as a member of the Viceroy's Executive Council.

== Major reform campaigns ==
=== Admission to Sanskrit education ===
One of Pillai's earliest campaigns was the agitation for the admission of Nair students to Sanskrit schools, where they had been denied entry on caste grounds. Through the Malayali Sabha, he organised sustained pressure on the authorities until this barrier was removed.

=== Upper cloth controversy ===
In the late nineteenth century, Nair women servants were prohibited from covering the upper part of their body when entering temple precincts, particularly during festivals at the Padmanabhaswamy Temple. Self-respecting Nair women found this deeply humiliating. Pillai took up their cause and agitated against this practice. His efforts bore fruit by the close of the nineteenth century, well after the earlier upper cloth rebellion of the Shanars (Nadars).

=== Reform of the matrilineal system ===
Pillai's most sustained and consequential campaign was against the Marumakkathayam system and the social evils associated with it. He submitted memoranda to the Travancore government demanding legislative reform of the laws of inheritance and marriage. He organised his followers to break social customs surrounding Talikettu Kalyanam, Tirandukuli, and other practices, and publicly identified those who resisted reform as enemies of Nair progress. He himself broke with restrictive customs at personal risk.

The persistent agitation by Pillai and his organisations led the Travancore government to appoint a three-member Marumakkathayam Committee in 1908 to study the matrilineal system. The committee consisted of Judge M. Krishna Pillai and High Court Vakils K. P. Padmanabha Menon and K. Krishnan Pandala. It was presided over by High Court Judge A. Govinda Pillai, with Excise Commissioner N. Raman Pillai serving as Secretary. The committee toured the entire state, examined 1,021 witnesses, and submitted its report by the end of the year, recommending the abolition of polygamy and polyandry.

The committee's recommendations led to the Nair Act, 1912, the first piece of legislation addressing the matrilineal system among the Nairs. However, the Act did not fully satisfy progressive reformers: it failed to provide for individual partition of taravad property and gave only half of a man's self-acquired property to his children, with the other half going to his nephews.

Pillai and his association continued to intensify the struggle. This sustained campaign ultimately resulted in the more comprehensive Nair Act, 1925, which provided for individual partition of joint family property and eliminated nephews' claims to the self-acquired property of their uncles. Related legislation followed, including the Ezhava Act, 1925, the Vellala Act, 1926, the Cochin Nair Regulations of 1919–1920 and 1937–1938, and the Mappila Act, 1939, progressively abolishing the matrilineal system across Kerala's communities.

=== Interdining controversy ===
In 1909, Pillai brought the question of interdining to a head by demanding that the Thampis (a Nair subcaste with aristocratic pretensions) should dine with other Nairs, arguing that both groups shared a common origin. When the Tampis refused, Pillai and his supporters boycotted the Palace feast in protest, delivering a pointed rebuke to the practice of untouchability within the community itself.

== Connection to the Malayali Memorial ==
Pillai's organisational work was contemporary with, and related to, the broader movement for native rights in Travancore. Barrister G. P. Pillai, a western-educated Travancorean and editor of the Madras Standard, led a campaign for the rights of native Travancoreans with the slogan "Travancore for Travancoreans." This campaign culminated in the Malayali Memorial (also called the Travancore Memorial), submitted to Maharaja Sri Mulam Tirunal (r. 1885–1924) and signed by approximately 10,037 persons.

Five years later, in 1896, Dr. P. Palpu (1863–1950), the pioneering champion of Ezhava uplift, submitted the famous Ezhava Memorial to the Maharaja. Pillai maintained close contact with Dr. Palpu and with C. V. Kunhiraman, another prominent Ezhava leader, in the joint effort to secure rights for the native communities of Travancore. Pillai played a key role in the collection of signatures and the submission of memorials during this period.

== Mentorship and legacy ==
=== Influence on later leaders ===
Pillai's decades of activism and organisational work provided guidance and inspiration to a new generation of Nair leaders, several of whom went on to play decisive roles in Kerala's political and social history. Among his prominent followers were:

- Mannath Padmanabhan (1878–1970), who later founded the Nair Service Society (NSS) on 31 October 1914 and became one of the most influential social reformers in Kerala's history.
- Changanassery Parameswaran Pillai (1877–1940), who served as NSS President and later as a High Court Judge.
- Swadeshabhimani Ramakrishna Pillai (1877–1916), the fearless journalist who opposed the policies of Dewan P. Rajagopalachari through his newspaper Swadeshabhimani and was banished from Travancore in 1910 by executive order, with his press confiscated.

=== Foundation of the Nair Service Society ===
Pillai's half-century of work — founding organisations, submitting memorials, campaigning for legislative reform, and educating the community about the need for social change — laid the direct groundwork for the establishment of the Nair Service Society on 31 October 1914 by Mannath Padmanabhan. The NSS carried forward the reform agenda that Pillai had championed throughout his life and continues to function as a major community organisation in Kerala.

== Death ==
C. Krishna Pillai died on 8 July 1916 at the age of 65. By the time of his death, the Keraleeya Nair Samaj and other organisations he had helped build were well established, and the Nair Service Society — founded just two years earlier — was already growing into the powerful institution that would carry his reformist legacy forward.

== Recognition ==
Pillai is regarded as one of the most important, yet often overlooked, figures in the social history of modern Kerala. Historian T. P. Sankarankutty Nair has argued that the Nairs of modern Kerala owe a significant debt to C. Krishna Pillai, without whose sustained campaign they would not have achieved the degree of social freedom they enjoy today. His honorific title Samudayothejakan reflects the community's recognition of his role as the individual who awakened the Nairs of Travancore from what contemporaries described as a "deep slumber."

== See also ==
- Nair Service Society
- Mannath Padmanabhan
- Malayali Memorial
- Marumakkathayam
- Swadeshabhimani Ramakrishna Pillai
- Changanassery Parameswaran Pillai
- C. V. Raman Pillai
- P. Palpu
- G. P. Pillai
- Kingdom of Travancore
