= NSS Hindu College, Changanassery =

Education institute in Perunna, Changanassery, India

NSS Hindu College
- Motto: तमसो मा ज्योतिर्गमय
- Motto in English: From darkness, lead me to the Light
- Type: Aided
- Established: 1947; 79 years ago
- Founder: Mannathu Padmanabha Pillai
- Parent institution: Nair Service Society
- Accreditation: NAAC 'A' Grade
- Affiliations: Mahatma Gandhi University, Kerala
- Principal: S.Sujatha
- Location: (India) Changanassery; 9.44074°N 76.54526°E
- Website: nsshinducollege.org

NSS Hindu College, Changanassery (NSSHC) is one of the oldest and largest institutions of higher education of Nair Service Society was established in 1947 by Indian social reformer and freedom fighter Mannathu Padmanabha Pillai and is located on par with its central headquarters at Perunna, Changanassery. The college is affiliated to Mahatma Gandhi University, Kottayam and is re-accredited by National Assessment and Accreditation Council (NAAC) with 'A' grade.

== History ==
The land stationing the college starts its recorded history of ownership from Ezhanthi Bhattathiri's and was later acquired by Kumaramangalam Namboothirippad's which they sold it to the public. Nair Service Society bought this northern part of the illam's property in the 1940s where the college was constructed. On establishment on 10 June 1947, the college started operation in the rooms provided at the NSS High School building in Changanassery.

The foundation stone of the existing structure was laid in July 1949 by Panampilly Govinda Menon, then Minister for Education of the state of Travancore–Cochin. The opening ceremony of the college was a fortnight long event held in January 1956 which started with the flag hoisting by Chithira Thirunal Balarama Varma, the king of erstwhile Travancore. The college was inaugurated by Sarvepalli Radhakrishnan, then vice president of India and declared open by Kanaiyalal Maneklal Munshi, then governor of state of Uttar Pradesh.

== Overview ==
=== Affiliation ===
The college was affiliated to the then University of Travancore when it was established in 1947. From 1983 onwards, it has been affiliated to Mahatma Gandhi University, Kottayam.

=== Accreditation ===
The National Assessment and Accreditation Council (NAAC) accredited the college with 'B++' grade in 2006. It was re-accredited with 'A' grade on third cycle by the 29th standing committee on 27 November 2017.

=== National Cadet Corps ===
The college has two units of National Cadet Corps, an Army Wing under 5 Kerala Battalion NCC, Changanassery with a sanctioned strength of 160 cadets and a Naval Wing under 5 Kerala Naval Unit, Changanassery with a sanctioned strength of 50 cadets.

=== National Service Scheme ===
The college has two units of National Service Scheme with a strength of 100 members each.

== Campus Infrastructure ==
The college has a playground of around 3.5 acre in 2:1 aspect ratio with fixed football goal posts, an open basketball court, a multi-gymnasium and on-site canteen. It stations one of the four University Study Centre's of Mahatma Gandhi University.

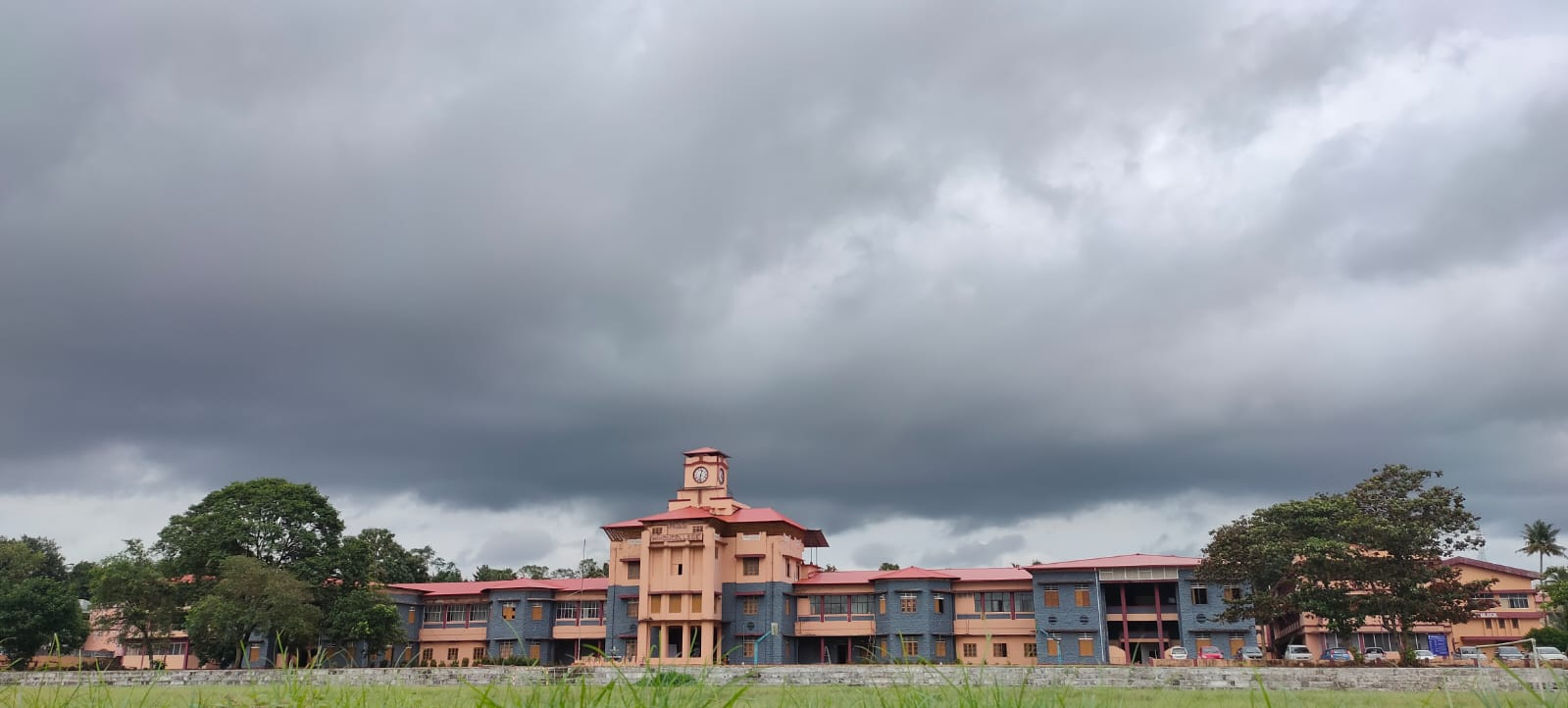
Main Block of NSS Hindu College, Changanassery

It has a LAN linked computer lab with an accommodation for 40 students. The library block houses about 80,676 books and is equipped with Koha integrated library management system, e-gate and information kiosk. It facilitates access to electronic resources like INFLIBNET and DELNET. Two ladies hostels are functioning in the campus with the principal as ex officio warden. As per the NIRF data, the college has a strength of around 2500 students and 100 faculties.

== Programmes ==
As per Mahatma Gandhi University regulations, the college follows Choice Based Credit and Semester System (CBCSS) from 2009 onwards for the three year undergraduate programme and Credit Based Semester System (CBCS) for the two year postgraduate programme from 2012. The Centralized Allotment Process (CAP) of the university handles admission procedure to the university qouta and admission to remaining few seats are handled by college management.

Department with Doctoral Programme

NSS Hindu College, Changanassery
Sl. No	Department	Undergraduate		Postgraduate	
Sl. No	Department	Course	Seats	Course	Seats
Arts
1.	Hindi	B.A. Hindi	30	M.A. Hindi	15+4
2.	English	B.A. English	30	M.A. English	12+3
3.	Malayalam	B.A. Malayalam	30	M.A. Malayalam	15+4
4.	Political Science	B.A. Politics	60	M.A. Politics	15+4
5.	History	B.A. History	120	M.A. History	15+4
6.	Economics	B.A. Economics	120	M.A. Economics	15+4
7.	Philosophy	B.A. Philosophy	60	—N/a	—N/a
Commerce
8.	Commerce	B.Com. Finance	60+10	M.Com. Finance	15+4
Science
9.	Botany	B.Sc. Botany	24+6	—N/a	—N/a
10.	Zoology	B.Sc. Zoology	24+6	M.Sc. Zoology	12+3
11.	Physics	B.Sc. Physics	24+6	M.Sc. Physics	12+3
12.	Chemistry	B.Sc. Chemistry	32+6	M.Sc. Chemistry	10+3
13.	Mathematics	B.Sc. Mathematics	60	M.Sc. Mathematics	15+4
14.	Food Science	B.Sc. Food Science and Quality Control	60	—N/a	—N/a
Physical Education
15.	Physical Education	Open Course (CBCSS)	—N/a	—N/a	—N/a
University Webpage College Webpage CAP Webpage

== Notable alumni ==
Judiciary
1. Justice Preeta A. K., Judge, Kerala High Court
Literary figures
1. Prabha Varma
2. Tony Mathew
3. Ganesh Puthur
4. Ambalapuzha Gopakumar
5. Nedumudi Harikumar
6. Ezhacherry Ramachandran
7. Acharya Narendra Bhooshan
Political figures
1. Ramesh Chennithala
2. K. Suresh Kurup
Actors and film industry
1. Rajeev Pillai
2. Janardhanan
3. Parvathy Jayaram
4. Praveena
5. G. Marthandan
6. Jayakrishnan,
7. Divya Padmini
8. Johny Antony
9. Swaroop Philip
10. Vishnu Narayanan

== See also ==
- Nair Service Society
- Education in Kottayam district
- List of Educational Institutions of Nair Service Society
