= Mahatma Gandhi College =

College in Thiruvananthapuram, Kerala, India

Coordinates: 8.5323°N 76.9429°E

- മഹാത്മാ ഗാന്ധി കോളേജ്
- Other name: MG College
- Motto: सा विद्या या विमुक्तये
- Type: Public
- Established: 1948; 78 years ago
- Affiliations: University of Kerala
- Principal: Dr. Kishore Ram
- Location: Kesavadasapuram, Thiruvananthapuram, Kerala, India
- Website: mgcollegetvm.ac.in

Mahatma Gandhi College is a college in Thiruvananthapuram, Kerala, India. It was founded by Mannathu Padmanabhan, the founder of the Nair Service Society. The college is affiliated to University of Kerala and is managed by Nair Service Society. It was awarded "College with potential for excellence" certificate by NAAC. As per the 2019 NIRF rankings, Mahatma Gandhi College stands is ranked 68th in India and fourth rank in Thiruvananthapuram.

== History ==
The college started functioning at Vadassery Amma Veedu at Perunthanni in 1948 and was later shifted to the present site at Kattachakkonam, now known as Kesavadasapuram. C. Rajagopalachari, the last Governor General of India, laid the foundation stone for the new building on 22 August 1948.

The Arts section was shifted to the building in 1949, and the Science section in 1950. The main building was completed in 1958 and was inaugurated by Pandit Jawaharlal Nehru, the first Prime Minister of India, on 24 April 1958. The college celebrated its Silver Jubilee in 1974–75. The foundation stone of the three-storeyed Mannam Memorial Block was laid by P. K. Narayana Panicker, General Secretary of the Nair Service Society (NSS) on 23 April 1989 and the block upon completion was inaugurated by Swaroop Singh, the then Governor of Kerala, on 02 October 1990.

== Overview ==
The college has 2,000 students, 13 degree and 10 postgraduate courses. Besides providing research facilities in various disciplines, the college has started an Instrumentation course attached to the Department of Physics.

== Programs of study ==
Courses
B.A. (Bachelor of Arts)	Malayalam	Hindi	English Language & Literature	Economics	History	Sociology
M.A. (Master of Arts)	Malayalam	Hindi	English Language & Literature	Economics		
B.Sc. (Bachelor of Science)	Mathematics	Physics	Chemistry	Zoology	Botany	Psychology
M.Sc. (Master of Science)	Mathematics	Physics	Chemistry	Zoology	Botany	
B.Com. (Bachelor of Commerce)	Commerce, Accountancy					
M.Com. (Master of Commerce)	Commerce, Accountancy					

== Notable alumni ==
- Mohanlal
- Madhu
- Murali
- Padmarajan
- Adoor Bhasi
- Priyadarshan
- Anil Nedumangad
- Sooraj Santhosh
- M Vijayakumar
- KN Balagopal
- Thennala Balakrishna Pillai
- Shaji Kailas
- Baiju
- Manikuttan
- Saji Surendran
- Arun Kumar Aravind
- Santhosh
- V. Madhusoodanan Nair
- Jobby Justin
- Justice Paripoornan
- Kavalam Sreekumar
- G. R. Anil
- Kochu Preman
- Jagannatha Varma
- Babu Rajeev IAS
- Christy Fernandez IAS

Mahatma Gandhi College

Succession list of Principals (1948-2010)

Sri. K. R. Krishna Iyer M.A. B.L. (Hons) 1948 – 49.

Sri. V. Narayana Pillai M.A. B.L. 1949 – 52 .

Sri. P.K. Krishna Pillai. M. A. (Hons) 1952 – 55 .

Sri. Kainikkara M. Kumara Pillai MA LT 1955 – 56.

Sri. Venkatachalam Iyer M. A. 1956 – 58.

Sri . M.P. Manmadhan M.A. 1958-66 & 1969-70.

Sri. G. Balakrishna Pillai M.A. , B.L. 1966 – 69

Sri. K.R. Gopinathan Nair B.A., MCom 1970 – 73.

Sri. N. Chandrasekharan Nair M. A. LLB. 1973 – 76.

Sri. K. Gopalakrishnan Nair M.A. 1976 – 82.

Sri. P. M. Krishnan Nair M.Sc 1982 – 84

Sri. C. G. Rajappan Nair M.Sc 1984 – 86.

Sri. N. Gopalakrishna Pillai M.Com 1986 & 1991 – 92.

Sri. K. Kanakavally Amma M. Sc 1986.

Sri. G. Pankajakshan Pillai M. A. 1986 – 89.

Sri. N. Chandradattan Nair M.Sc 1989 – 91.

Sri. Harikumaran Nair M. Com 1992 – 94.

Sri. K.G. Padmanabhan Nair M.A. 1994 – 95.

Sri. S. Gopakumaran Nair M.Com. 1995 – 96.

Sri. K.G. Narayana Pillai M.Sc., Ph. D 1996 – 97.

Sri. K.S. Somanathan Nair M.A. 1997 – 98.

Sri. M.R. Mohandas M.Com 1998 – 99.

Sri. K. Ravindran Nair M.Sc. 1999 – 2001.

Sri. K. Gopalakrishnan Nair M.A. 2001 .

Sri. K. Ravindran Nair M.Sc 2001 – 04.

Sri. S. Vijaya Kumar M. A. M. Phil 2004 – 08

Dr. G. Madhukumar M.Sc. PhD, L.L.B 2008 – 2010

Dr.G. Jayakumar M.Sc.,M.Phil., PhD 2010 -...

== Controversies ==
In April 2013, the principal of Mahatma Gandhi College objected to the Akhil Bharatiya Vidyarthi Parishad (ABVP) college unit collecting money for an "evening farewell money". In a related event, the Kerala Women's Commission, after learning that student activists had detained a girl student for more than seven hours, launched its own inquiry.

On 29 July 2013, starting at around 10:30 am, several students and outsiders, suspected to be ABVP activists and sympathizers, hurled crude explosives and damaged college property at Mahatma Gandhi College. Police swung batons to disperse the students and detained 10 of them (though some of those detained could have been innocent). Following the incident, a "Special Investigation Team" was set up to investigate the incident, and Thiruvanchoor Radhakrishnan visited the college to see the damage. Due to clashes between the Students' Federation of India (SFI) and the ABVP, campus politics is banned as of 2019 per a Kerala High Court order.

== See also ==
- Colleges in Thiruvananthapuram
- Education in Kerala
- Nair Service Society
