= C. I. Issac =

Indian historian

- Born: Karukachal, Kerala, India.
- Occupation: Historian

C. I. Issac is an academic historian and social activist from Kerala, India. In 2023, he was honored with the Padma Shri.

== Life and work ==
Issac was born at Karukachal in 1962. He studied at NSS Hindu College, Changanassery. While still a college student he was attracted to RSS and Jan Sangh and was influenced by the RSS leader of that time, Advocate MS Karunakaran, who later became a national leader of the Bharatiya Mazdoor Sangh.

He was the former head of the Department of History at CMS College, Kottayam.

He has been associated with the Sangh Parivar Rashtriya Swayamsevak Sangh (RSS) for several decades. He serves as the vice-president of the right-wing think-tank Bharatheeya Vichara Kendram and has been the vocal advocate of right-wing groups' 'Ghar Wapsi' programme.

Appointed in 2015 under the Human Resources Development Ministry, he was the only Christian representative in the Indian Council of Historical Research (ICHR). His studies or research have re-examined, challenged the historical accounts of Kerala's nationalist movements, with a focus on the Malabar revolution, (Moplah Rebellion in British colonial records) led by Variamkunnath Kunhamed Haji. As part of an ICHR sub-committee, he also contributed to a recommendation to remove 382 Moplah participants in the 1921 rebellion from the list of freedom fighters in the Dictionary of Martyrs of India’s Freedom Struggle (1857-1947).

Under the leadership of Issac, the high-level committee for social sciences, formed by the National Council of Educational Research and Training (NCERT) recommended the integration of the Indian Knowledge System (IKS) into the syllabus for all subjects and the inclusion of ‘classical history’ instead of ‘ancient history’ in the curriculum.

== Books ==
He has authored over 10 books. Some of his books include the following:

- The Evolution of Christian Church in India, ISBN 978 81 7255 056 1 2014, Soorygatha Publishers, PB No 3517, Kochi 682 035
- Indocentric vs. Eurocentric Approaches in Indian National History

== See also ==
- List of Padma Shri award recipients (2020–2029)
