= Ezhava Memorial Petition =

1896 petition in India

The Ezhava Memorial or the Ezhava Memorial Petition was a great petition signed by 13,176 Ezhavas and submitted to the King of Travancore on 3 September 1896 under the leadership of Padmanabhan Palpu.

== Background ==
A petition named Malayali Memorial was already submitted to the King of Travancore under the leadership of GP Pillai on 1 January 1891, for the natives to get a fair share in the government service. At that time Avarnas like Ezhavas were not appointed in Travancore posts with a monthly salary of more than 5 rupees. When those who converted to Christianity got all the benefits, Ezhavas did not get any benefits. The same was the case for school admission. Through the Ezhava Memorial, the Ezhavas demanded that they too get these without changing their religion.

GP Pillai had drawn the attention of the House of Commons and Congress meetings in England about the disadvantages of the Ezhavas, but to no avail. Having obtained an LMS degree, Dr. Palpu applied for a job under the Travancore government, but the application was rejected.

Not amused by the presentation of the Malayali memorial, the Tamil Brahmin group soon submitted a counter-memorial to the King, refuting all its arguments. In effect, this created an atmosphere of competition between communities. In May 1895 Dr Palpu himself submitted a petition to Diwan Shankarasubbayar in his own capacity. When the discussion with the Diwan did not yield any results, under his leadership, in September 1896, a petition signed by 13176 members of the Ezhava community was submitted to the King, which came to be known as the Ezhava Memorial.
