= G. Sukumaran Nair =

Indian community leader and politician

General Secretary of the Nair Service Society
- Incumbent
- Assumed office 25 June 2011
- Preceded by: P. K. Narayana Panicker

General Secretary of the National Democratic Party
- In office 1995 – 1996
- Preceded by: P. K. Narayana Panicker
- Succeeded by: Office abolished

Personal details
- Born: 18 April 1941 (age 85) Changanassery, Kingdom of Travancore, British India (present day Kottayam, Kerala, India)
- Spouse: K. Kumaridevi (death 2019)
- Children: 4
- Occupation: Community leader

Gopurathinkal Sukumaran Nair (born 18 April 1941) is the current and 10th General Secretary of the Nair Service Society since 25 June 2011. Nair was the Assistant Secretary of the organisation for 10 years before elected as the General Secretary.

== Personal life ==
His wife K. Kumaridevi died on 26 March 2019 at the age of 75 and they have two daughters and two sons. His daughter Dr. S. Sujatha was the principal of the NSS Hindu College, Changanassery and a member of the Mahatma Gandhi University Syndicate before her resignation on 28 May 2013.

== Career ==
He began his career with the NSS as a clerk in 1962 and subsequently held posts as an administrative officer, assistant Secretary, Secretary and then General Secretary. He has been elected as the General Secretary of the NSS for five consecutive times.

He has been a strong proponent of the equidistance policy towards political parties and a strong opponent of the caste census which he claims will only exacerbate corruption under the guise of reservation and to appease vote banks.
