= P. K. Narayana Panicker =

Indian advocate

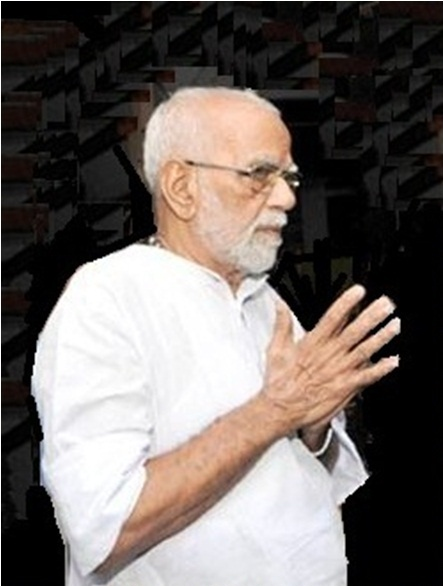

23rd President of the Nair Service Society
- In office 25 June 2011 – 29 February 2012
- Preceded by: P. V. Neelakanta Pillai
- Succeeded by: P. N. Narendranathan Nair

9th General Secretary of the Nair Service Society
- In office 1983 – 25 June 2011
- Preceded by: R. P. Nair
- Succeeded by: G. Sukumaran Nair

15th Treasurer of the Nair Service Society
- In office 1977 – 1983
- Preceded by: T. N. Upendranatha Kurup
- Succeeded by: V. K. Sekharan Nair

Personal details
- Born: 15 August 1930 Changanassery, Kingdom of Travancore, British India (present day Kottayam, Kerala, India)
- Died: 29 February 2012 (aged 81) Changanassery, Kottayam, Kerala, India
- Spouse: M. Savithri Amma (death 2006)
- Parents: Pichamathil A. N. Velu Pillai; Lakshmikutty Amma
- Occupation: Community leader; Teacher; Lawyer

P. K. Narayana Panicker (15 August 1930 – 29 February 2012) was the President and General Secretary of the Nair Service Society (NSS), the social service organisation established in 1914. He is the second-longest-serving general secretary of the organisation (after founder Mannath Padmanabhan), who has served 28 years in the post. He was an advocate by profession, who came to the front row of the organisation in 1977 as its treasurer and later became General secretary in 1984. He was also the General Secretary of National Democratic Party and Chairman of Changanassery Municipality.

== Biography ==
Narayana Panicker was born on 27 August 1930 as the first son and third child of the seven kids of Vazhappally Padinjarubhagam Pichamathil A. N. Velu Pillai and Lakshmikutty Amma. He completed his education at St.Teresa's Higher Secondary School, Changanassery, St. Berchmans College, Changanassery and Government Law College, Ernakulam. He has worked both as a teacher and as an advocate during the course of his career.

He has also worked as the Chairman of Changanassery Municipality, member of Kerala University Senet, member of M.G. University Syndicate, member of Guruvayoor Devaswom and also as the president of Changanassery Lions Club. In 1977, he was elected as the treasurer of Nair Service Society. On New Year's Day in 1984, he became the General Secretary of NSS, succeeding Kidangoor Gopalakrishna Pillai. He continued in office until 2011, when he was succeeded by his assistant secretary G. Sukumaran Nair. He is the second-longest served General Secretary of N.S.S. He was elected as the President of N.S.S. in 2011.

Panicker died on 29 February 2012 at his home due to age-related complications. He was aged 81 at the time of his death. His health had been deteriorating for a long time. He was also the serving President of Nair Service Society when he died, having elected less than a year ago. His dead body was kept for public view in the N.S.S. headquarters in Perunna and was cremated with full state honours at his home premises. He is survived by three sons - Satheesh Kumar, Jagadeesh Kumar and Ranjith Kumar. His wife Savithri Amma predeceased him in 2006.

== Awards ==
- Sreshta Purusha Award 2009
