= K. P. Ramachandran Nair =

Indian politician

- Constituency: Alappuzha

Minister for Health
- In office 1 September 1983 – 29 May 1985

Member of Kerala Legislative Assembly
- In office 1982–1987
- Preceded by: P. K. Vasudevan Nair
- Succeeded by: Rosamma Punnoose
- In office 1991–1996
- Preceded by: Rosamma Punnoose
- Succeeded by: K. C. Venugopal
- Constituency: Alappuzha

Personal details
- Born: 1 January 1922
- Died: 28 February 2004 (aged 82)
- Party: National Democratic Party

K. P. Ramachandran Nair (1922-2004) was the founder of National Democratic Party and the Minister for Health from 1 September 1983 to 29 May 1985 in Kerala.

He was born on 1 January 1922 to Dr. K. P. Panikkar. He married T. Ratnamma. He died on 28 February 2004.

== Political career ==
K. P. Ramachandran Nair was closely associated with the activities of Nair Service Society (NSS). He was once the treasurer of the NSS and even its director board member. Though he entered politics through Indian National Congress, he later helped to found National Democratic Party (NDP), the political arm of the NSS.

He was the Chairman of Alleppey Municipal Council from 1968-79. In 1982 Kerala State Assembly Election K. P. Ramachandran Nair defeated P. K Vasudevan Nair of Communist Party of India by a margin of 1590 votes. In 1991 Kerala State Assembly Election he won by 746 votes by defeating P.S Somasekharan of Communist Party of India. Both the times he secured victory from Alappuzha state assembly constituency. In third K Karunakaran Ministry, he assumed the office of Minister for Health from 1 September 1983 to 29 May 1985.

=== Electoral Performance ===
Alappuzha Legislative Assembly Constituency (1982)
Party	Candidate	Votes
National Democratic Party (NDP)	K.P Ramachandran Nair	35,014
Communist Party of India (CPI)	P. K. Vasudevan Nair	33,424
Independent	K. P. M. Sheriff	420
Independent	Acko	213
Invalid		502

Alappuzha Legislative Assembly Constituency (1991)
Party	Candidate	Votes
National Democratic Party (NDP)	K.P Ramachandran Nair	42,269
Communist Party of India (CPI)	P. S Somasekharan	41,519
Bharatiya Janata Party (BJP)	Arumugham Pillai	2,513
Independent	S Seethilal	637
Lokdal	Vijayan Velu	336
Independent	Usman Mohammed Yoosuf	201
