= The Madras Standard =

The Madras Standard was an English language newspaper published from Madras. It was founded by the lawyer and journalist Barrister G. P. Pillai. A report for the week ending 2 April 1904 states the circulation as 3000, the highest in the list of English language newspapers in India.
