= K. P. Karunakara Menon =

Indian social worker

K. P. Karunakara Menon (1930–2002) was the president of Nair Service Society till his death in 2002. He was succeeded by Sri. P. V. Neelakanta Pillai. Menon, who hailed from Thrissur was one of the few Nair outside Travancore to become the president of NSS. He is best remembered for his fierce stand against the reservations and affirmative quotas for lower castes in the educational institutions of Kerala.
