= 1987 Kerala Legislative Assembly election =

1987 Kerala state assembly election
- 23 March 1987

All 140 seats in the Kerala Legislative Assembly 71 seats needed for a majority
- Turnout: 80.54% (▲7.03)
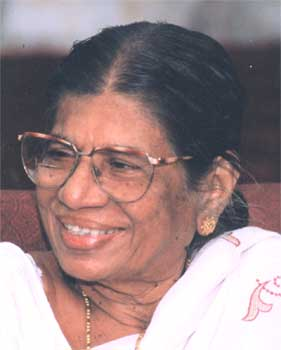

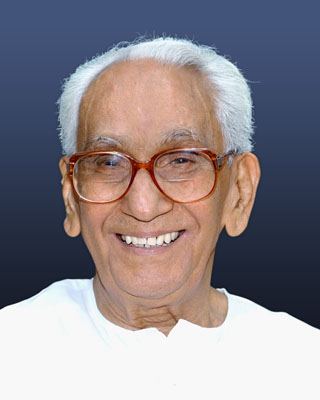
	First party	Second party
Leader	K. R. Gouri Amma	K. Karunakaran
Party	CPI(M)	INC
Alliance	LDF	UDF
Leader's seat	Chertala	Mala
Last election	28	20
Seats won	38	33
Seat change	▲10	▲13
- Kerala, India; Kerala, one of the states in South India, has an electorate of more than 21 million people.

- Alliance wise Result
Chief Minister before election
K. Karunakaran
INC
Elected Chief Minister
E. K. Nayanar
CPI(M)

The elections to the Eighth Kerala Assembly were held on 23 March 1987. The UDF and the LDF were the two major political fronts in the arena. The UDF had the INC(I), IUML, KC(J), KC(M), NDP (P), SRP(S) and the RSP(S) as its constituents. The LDF consisted of the CPI(M), CPI, RSP, IC(S), Janata Party and the Lok Dal.

== Background ==
Kerala saw polarisation and splits of political forces since the formation of the United Democratic Front Ministry on 24 May 1982. The merger of the two factions of the Indian National Congress, the INC (I) and the INC (A), in November 1982 marked the beginning of the political polarization.

Another important event was the reunion of the IUML and the AIML in August 1985. Before the election, the Kerala Congress once again split into two; each faction continuing to remain in the UDF. A faction of the Congress (S) and the Janata (G) also joined the INC (I).

In the meantime, there were splits in the NDP and the Socialist Republican Party (SRP). The NDP group was led by Kidangoor Gopalakrishna Pillai and the SRP faction. led by Mr. Vijayarajan left the UDF, whereas the other factions of these parties stood with the Left Democratic Front.

The CPI-M took disciplinary action against their MLA, Mr. M.V. Raghavan. Consequently, he launched a new party, Communist Marxist Party (CMP). The emergence of a third front, the BJP-Hindu Munnani Front, was another political development.

== Results ==
Though the elections had been declared for all the 140 constituencies, the elections to two constituencies - Vamanapuram and Kottayam were countermanded following the demise of two independent candidates. While the election to the 138 constituencies was held on 23 March, the elections in the other two constituencies were delayed until 2 June 1987.

The LDF secured a decisive majority in the House securing 78 seats. The UDF won 61 seats. An independent won at Ettumanoor. The third front could not open an account.

=== Party Wise Results ===
Party Wise Results
Party	Seats
Communist Party of Indian (Marxist) (CPI(M))	38
Indian National Congress (INC)	33
Communist Party of India (CPI)	16
Indian Union Muslim League (IUML)	15
Janata Party (JNP)	7
Indian Congress (Socialist-Sarat Chandra Sinha) ICS(SCS)	6
Kerala Congress (KEC)	5
Revolutionary Socialist Party (RSP)	5
Lok Dal (LKD)	1
Independent (IND)	14
Total	140

=== Constituency Wise Results ===
Constituency		Winner				Runner Up				Margin	%
#	Name	Candidate	Party	Votes	%	Candidate	Party	Votes	%	Margin	%
1	Manjeswar	Cherkalam Abdullah	IUML	33,853	41.85	H. Shankara Alva	BJP	27,107	33.51	6,746	8.34
2	Kasaragod	C. T. Ahammad Ali	IUML	41,407	47.81	Shrikrishan Bhat	BJP	27,350	31.58	14,057	16.23
3	Udma	K. P. Kunhikannan	INC	43,775	51.42	Purushothaman K.	CPM	35,930	42.20	7,845	9.22
4	Hosdrug (SC)	N. Manoharan Master	INC	46,677	44.97	Pallipram Balan	CPI	46,618	44.91	59	0.06
5	Trikkarpur	E. K. Nayanar	CPM	56,037	50.16	K. Kunhikrishnan	INC	49,620	44.42	6,417	5.74
6	Irikkur	K. C. Joseph	INC	51,437	51.37	James Mathew	CPM	43,961	43.90	7,476	7.47
7	Payyannur	C. P. Narayanan	CPM	50,421	50.34	M. K. Raghavan	INC	42,581	42.51	7,840	7.83
8	Taliparamba	K. K. N. Pariyaram	CPM	52,247	49.10	C. P. Moossankutty	IND	49,631	46.64	2,616	2.46
9	Azhicode	M. V. Raghavan	IND	41,629	48.62	E. P. Jayarajan	CPM	40,240	46.99	1,389	1.63
10	Cannanore	P. Bhaskaran	INC	42,787	49.75	A. K. Sasheendran	INS(SCS)	34,739	40.39	8,048	9.36
11	Edakkad	O. Bharathan	CPM	45,008	49.00	A. P. Jayasheelan	INC	41,012	44.65	3,996	4.35
12	Tellicherry	Kodiyeri Balakrishnan	CPM	44,520	48.53	K. Sudhakaran	INC	39,152	42.68	5,368	5.85
13	Peringalam	P. R. Kurup	JP	41,694	45.77	E. T. Mohammed Basheer	IUML	41,338	45.38	356	0.39
14	Kuthuparamba	K. P. Mamoo Master	CPM	47,734	50.42	P. Ramakrishnan	INC	38,771	40.95	8,963	9.47
15	Peravoor	K. P. Noordeen	INC	47,817	46.19	Ramachandran Kadannapally	INS(SCS)	46,012	44.45	1,805	1.74
16	North Wynad (ST)	K. Raghvan Master	INC	46,368	51.45	K. C. Kunhiraman	CPM	37,409	41.51	8,959	9.94
17	Badagara	K. Chandrasekharan	JP	50,309	51.92	Sujanapal A.	INC	39,776	41.05	10,533	10.87
18	Nadapuram	Sathyan Mokeri	CPI	46,945	47.62	N. P. Moideen	INC	45,688	46.35	1,257	1.27
19	Meppayur	A. Kanaran	CPM	48,337	49.68	A. V. Abdurahiman Haji	IUML	44,663	45.90	3,674	3.78
20	Quilandy	M. T. Padma	INC	48,444	47.59	T. Devi	CPM	43,742	42.97	4,702	4.62
21	Perambra	A. K. Padmanabhan	CPM	49,034	48.26	K. A. Devassia	IND	46,584	45.85	2,450	2.41
22	Balusseri	A. C. Shanmukhadas	INS(SCS)	46,832	51.21	Vijaya D. Nair	INC	35,348	38.65	11,484	12.56
23	Koduvally	P. M. Aboobacker	IUML	50,373	51.24	P. Raghavan Nair	JP	37,062	37.70	13,311	13.54
24	Calicut-I	M. Dasan	CPM	44,810	46.55	M. Kamalam	INC	37,102	38.54	7,708	8.01
25	Calicut-II	C. P. Kunhu	CPM	40,749	43.54	K. K. Mohammed	IUML	38,472	41.11	2,277	2.43
26	Beypore	T. K. Hamza	CPM	47,537	44.86	Abdurahiman Master	IUML	40,206	37.94	7,331	6.92
27	Kunnamangalam (SC)	C. P. Balan Vydiar	CPM	37,557	43.62	K. P. Raman	IUML	37,264	43.28	293	0.34
28	Thiruvambadi	P. P. George	INC	48,730	55.15	Mathai Chacko	CPM	32,946	37.29	15,784	17.86
29	Kalpetta	M. P. Veerendra Kumar	JP	52,362	58.00	C. Mammutty	IUML	34,404	38.11	17,958	19.89
30	Sultan's Battery	K. K. Ramachandran Master	INC	39,102	39.86	Cyriac John	INS(SCS)	34,976	35.65	4,126	4.21
31	Wandoor (SC)	Pandalam Sudhakaran	INC	49,848	52.39	U. Uthaman	CPM	35,967	37.80	13,881	14.59
32	Nilambur	Aryadan Mohammed	INC	55,154	50.54	Devadas Pottekad	CPM	44,821	41.07	10,333	9.47
33	Manjeri	Ishaque Kurrikkal	IUML	56,783	63.87	G. Kunjukrishan Pillai	LKD	24,099	27.11	32,684	36.76
34	Malappuram	P. K. Kunhalikutty	IUML	48,641	63.08	N. Aboobacker	INS(SCS)	18,698	24.25	29,943	38.83
35	Kondotty	P. Seethi Hari	IUML	43,961	49.34	Madathil Muhammed Haji	JP	27,765	31.16	16,196	18.18
36	Tirurangadi	Kunhalikutty Keyi C. P.	IUML	45,586	56.77	E. P. Muhammedali	CPI	19,738	24.58	25,848	32.19
37	Tanur	E. Ahamed	IUML	49,530	64.46	K. Bappu	CPM	13,745	17.89	35,785	46.57
38	Tirur	Moideenkutty Haji K.	IUML	46,674	49.02	Kuruniyan Syed	INS(SCS)	37,283	39.15	9,391	9.87
39	Ponnani	P. T. Mohanakrishnan	INC	44,432	46.82	E. K. Imbichi Bava	CPM	42,299	44.57	2,133	2.25
40	Kuttippuram	Korambavil Ahamed Haji	IUML	45,654	64.73	Choorappilakkal Alavikutty	CPM	15,087	21.39	30,567	43.34
41	Mankada	Abdul Majeed K. P.	IUML	45,810	52.53	P. Moidu	CPM	34,888	40.01	10,922	12.52
42	Perinthalmanna	Nalakath Sooppy	IUML	48,027	52.91	R. N. Manzhi	CPM	39,833	43.88	8,194	9.03
43	Thrithala (SC)	M. P. Thami	INC	39,977	47.18	M. K. Krishnan	CPM	36,881	43.53	3,096	3.65
44	Pattambi	Leela Damodara Menon	INC	40,507	47.68	K. E. Ismail	CPI	35,005	41.20	5,502	6.48
45	Ottapalam	K. Sankaranarayanan	INC	38,237	47.14	V. C. Kabeer	INS(SCS)	36,527	45.03	1,710	2.11
46	Sreekrishnapuram	P. Balan	INC	46,898	48.97	E. Padmanabhan	CPM	43,380	45.30	3,518	3.67
47	Mannarkkad	Kalladi Mohammed	IUML	48,450	49.42	P. Kumaran	CPI	44,990	45.89	3,460	3.53
48	Malampuzha	T. Sivadasa Menon	CPM	43,419	52.45	A. Thankappan	INC	33,105	39.99	10,314	12.46
49	Palghat	C. M. Sundaram	IND	38,774	44.35	Girija Surendran	CPM	32,709	37.41	6,065	6.94
50	Chittur	K. A. Chandran	INC	49,112	52.95	K. Krishnamurty	JP	40,875	44.07	8,237	8.88
51	Kollengode	C. T. Krishnan	CPM	45,933	49.06	K. P. Gangadhara Menon	INC	41,831	44.68	4,102	4.38
52	Coyalmannam (SC)	T. K. Arumughan	CPM	45,394	50.95	Ayyappan Master	INC	39,604	44.45	5,790	6.50
53	Alathur	C. K. Rajendran	CPM	44,381	49.77	C. S. Ramachandran Master	IND	43,170	48.41	1,211	1.36
54	Chelakara (SC)	M. A. Kittappan	INC	44,011	50.05	K. V. Pushpa	CPM	36,260	41.24	7,751	8.81
55	Wadakkancherry	K. S. Narayanan Namboodiry	INC	45,389	48.45	C. K. Nanu	JP	37,206	39.72	8,183	8.73
56	Kunnamkulam	K. P. Aravindakshan	CPM	43,327	46.44	V. Balaram	INC	42,918	46.00	409	0.44
57	Cherpu	V. V. Raghavan	CPI	43,547	50.03	K. M. Radhakrishnan	IND	37,260	42.81	6,287	7.22
58	Trichur	E. K. Menon	CPM	41,822	47.45	M. Venugopala Menon	IND	37,562	42.61	4,260	4.84
59	Ollur	A. M. Paraman	CPI	46,513	48.17	Raghavan Pozhakadavil	INC	44,780	46.37	1,733	1.80
60	Kodakara	K. P. Viswanathan	INC	43,172	46.22	M. A. Karthikeyan	CPM	40,636	43.51	2,536	2.71
61	Chalakudi	K. J. George	JP	39,389	46.86	K. J. Rappai	KEC	34,996	41.63	4,393	5.23
62	Mala	K. Karunakaran	INC	46,301	51.77	Meenakshi Thampan	CPI	40,009	44.73	6,292	7.04
63	Irinjalakuda	Lonappan Nambadan	IND	48,567	52.51	M. C. Paul	INC	37,478	40.52	11,089	11.99
64	Manalur	V. M. Sudheeran	INC	41,426	50.07	P. C. Joseph	CPM	35,239	42.59	6,187	7.48
65	Guruvayoor	P. K. K. Bava	IUML	38,611	47.81	P. C. Hameed Haji	IND	30,677	37.98	7,934	9.83
66	Nattika	Krishnan Kaniyamparambil	CPI	37,009	45.62	Sidharthan Kattungal	INC	35,028	43.18	1,981	2.44
67	Kodungallur	V. K. Rajan	CPI	45,251	48.28	K. P. Dhanapalan	INC	41,755	44.55	3,496	3.73
68	Ankamali	M. V. Mani	KEC	53,267	50.25	M. C. Josephine	CPM	47,767	45.06	5,500	5.19
69	Vadakkekara	S. Sarma	CPM	43,726	47.30	M. I. Shanavas	INC	43,324	46.86	402	0.44
70	Parur	N. Sivan Pillai	CPI	39,495	48.59	A. C. Jose	INC	37,129	45.68	2,366	2.91
71	Narakal (SC)	K. K. Madhavan	INS(SCS)	43,051	50.25	Malippuram Bhaskaran	INC	39,083	45.62	3,968	4.63
72	Ernakulam	M. K. Sanoo	IND	42,904	44.97	A. L. Jacob	INC	32,872	34.46	10,032	10.51
73	Mattancherry	M. J. Zakaria	IUML	25,906	38.91	T. M. Mohamed	CPM	24,033	36.10	1,873	2.81
74	Palluruthy	T. P. Peethambaran Master	INS(SCS)	49,549	47.81	M. K. Raghavan	INC	46,340	44.71	3,209	3.10
75	Trippunithura	V. Viswanatha Menon	CPM	51,965	49.42	S. N. Nair	IND	44,452	42.27	7,513	7.15
76	Alwaye	K. Mohamadali	INC	52,159	46.46	T. O. Kather Pallai	IND	46,035	41.01	6,124	5.45
77	Perumbavoor	Thankachan P. P.	INC	47,094	49.68	Raman Kartha	JP	39,989	42.18	7,105	7.50
78	Kunnathunad	T. H. Musthaffa	INC	49,852	50.66	V. B. Cherian	CPM	44,075	44.79	5,777	5.87
79	Piravom	Gopi Kottamunikkal	CPM	41,614	44.15	Benny Behanan	INC	25,314	26.86	16,300	17.29
80	Muvattupuzha	A. V. Issac	IND	43,970	47.29	V. V. Joseph	KEC	40,514	43.57	3,456	3.72
81	Kothamangalam	T. M. Jacob	IND	46,847	48.33	T. M. Paily	IND	44,715	46.13	2,132	2.20
82	Thodupuzha	P. J. Joseph	KEC	49,535	48.95	M. C. Mathew	CPM	39,283	38.82	10,252	10.13
83	Devicolam (SC)	Sundaram Manickam	CPM	43,945	49.93	Ganapathy	IND	40,040	45.49	3,905	4.44
84	Idukki	Rosamma Chacko	INC	34,330	36.40	P. P. Sulaiman Rawther	IND	32,760	34.74	1,570	1.66
85	Udumbanchola	Mathew Stephen	IND	54,127	49.84	Jinadevan M.	CPM	49,187	45.29	4,940	4.55
86	Peermade	K. K. Thomas	INC	41,517	47.98	C. A. Kurian	CPI	39,426	45.56	2,091	2.42
87	Kanjirappally	K. J. Thomas	CPM	36,777	40.41	George J. Mathew	IND	31,894	35.04	4,883	5.37
88	Vazhoor	Kanam Rajendran	CPI	41,611	50.93	P. C. Thomas	IND	36,192	44.30	5,419	6.63
89	Changanacherry	C. F. Thomas	IND	47,977	52.83	V. R. Bhaskaran	CPM	37,362	41.14	10,615	11.69
90	Kottayam	T. K. Ramakrishanan	CPM	55,422	53.97	Thiruvanchoor Radhakrishnan	INC	45,896	44.70	9,526	9.27
91	Ettumanoor	George Joseph Padipara	IND	41,098	44.29	T. Raman Bhattathiripad	IND	38,565	41.56	2,533	2.73
92	Puthuppally	Oomen Chandy	INC	49,170	50.81	V. N. Vasavan	CPM	40,006	41.34	9,164	9.47
93	Poonjar	N. M. Joseph	JP	37,604	47.26	P. C. George	KEC	36,528	45.91	1,076	1.35
94	Palai	K. M. Mani	IND	46,483	54.95	K. S. Sebastian	INS(SCS)	35,938	42.48	10,545	12.47
95	Kaduthuruthy	P. C. Thomas	IND	44,560	50.85	P. M. Mathew	IND	41,364	47.20	3,196	3.65
96	Vaikom (SC)	P. K. Raghavan	CPI	44,985	48.35	P. K. Gopi	INC	44,609	47.94	376	0.41
97	Aroor	K. R. Gowri	CPM	49,648	50.70	P. J. Francis	INC	44,033	44.97	5,615	5.73
98	Sherthalai	Vayalar Ravi	INC	43,812	49.01	C. K. Chandrappan	CPI	41,528	46.46	2,284	2.55
99	Mararikulam	T. J. Anjalose	CPM	60,190	53.43	Prakasam R.	IND	48,099	42.70	12,091	10.73
100	Alleppey	Rosamma Punnoose	CPI	36,742	45.90	Kalarcode Narayanan	IND	23,908	29.87	12,834	16.03
101	Ambalapuzha	V. Dinakaran	INC	41,938	47.62	G. Sudhakaran	CPM	41,814	47.48	124	0.14
102	Kuttanad	K. C. Joseph	KEC	41,096	48.04	M. M. Anthony	CPM	37,833	44.22	3,263	3.82
103	Haripad	Ramesh Chennithala	INC	49,420	49.92	A. V. Thamarakshan	IND	45,603	46.07	3,817	3.85
104	Kayamkulam	M. R. Gopalakrishnan	CPM	43,986	51.43	K. Gopinathan	INC	36,306	42.45	7,680	8.98
105	Thiruvalla	Mathew T. Thomas	JP	32,941	44.35	P. C. Thomas	IND	31,726	42.72	1,215	1.63
106	Kallooppara	C. A. Mathew	INS(SCS)	30,223	41.59	T. S. John	KEC	28,467	39.17	1,756	2.42
107	Aranmula	K. K. Sreenivasan	INC	33,405	45.84	P. Sarasappan	CPM	28,538	39.16	4,867	6.68
108	Chengannur	Mammen Iype	INS(SCS)	39,836	49.70	R. Ramachandran Nair	IND	24,133	30.11	15,703	19.59
109	Mavelikara	S. Govinda Kurup	CPM	41,178	47.71	K. P. Ramachandran Nair	IND	32,977	38.20	8,201	9.51
110	Pandalam (SC)	V. Kesevan	CPM	47,620	49.83	Damodaran Kalasseri	INC	45,512	47.62	2,108	2.21
111	Ranni	Eappen Varghese	KEC	33,265	41.55	K. I. Idiculla Mappilla	CPM	32,062	40.05	1,203	1.50
112	Pathanamthitta	K. K. Nair	IND	35,249	42.67	Kottara Gopalakrishnan	INS(SCS)	22,551	27.30	12,698	15.37
113	Konni	Chittoor Sasankan Nair	IND	40,059	48.10	V. S. Chandrasekhran Pillai	CPM	37,767	45.35	2,292	2.75
114	Pathanapuram	E. Chandrasekharan Nair	CPI	46,611	50.72	A. George	IND	34,008	37.01	12,603	13.71
115	Punaloor	Chitharenjan	CPI	47,745	49.20	Surendran Pillai	KEC	36,669	37.79	11,076	11.41
116	Chadayamangalam	K. R. Chandramohanan	CPI	41,524	53.10	R. Radhakrishna Pillai	IND	30,255	38.69	11,269	14.41
117	Kottarakara	P. Balakrishna Pillai	KEC	36,813	43.13	E. Rajendran	CPI	34,716	40.67	2,097	2.46
118	Neduvathur (SC)	B. Raghavan	CPM	47,334	56.70	Kottakuzhy Sukumaran	KEC	32,170	38.53	15,164	18.17
119	Adoor	R. Unnikrishna Pillai	CPM	37,990	48.01	Thennala Balakrishna Pillai	INC	36,764	46.46	1,226	1.55
120	Kunnathur (SC)	T. Nanu Master	RSP	52,447	52.30	K. K. Balakrishnan	INC	41,794	41.67	10,653	10.63
121	Karungapally	P. S. Sreenivasan	CPI	48,622	53.82	K. C. Rajan	INC	35,927	39.77	12,695	14.05
122	Chavara	Baby John	RSP	47,987	52.76	K. Suresh Babu	INC	38,450	42.28	9,537	10.48
123	Kundara	J. Mercy Kutty Amma	CPM	42,715	50.66	Thoppil Revi	INC	35,751	42.40	6,964	8.26
124	Quilon	Babu Divakaran	RSP	42,617	49.51	Kadavoor Sivadasan	IND	29,895	34.73	12,722	14.78
125	Eravipuram	V. P. Ramakrishna Pillai	RSP	53,318	49.80	A. Yoonus Kunju	IUML	46,612	43.54	6,706	6.26
126	Chathanoor	P. Ravindran	CPI	46,501	48.52	C. V. Padmarajan	INC	44,045	45.96	2,456	2.56
127	Varkala	Varkala Radhakrishnan	CPM	40,381	53.75	N. Sreenivasan	IND	25,921	34.50	14,460	19.25
128	Attingal	Ananthalavattom Anandan	CPM	42,413	52.72	Kaviyad Divakara Panicker	INC	33,528	41.68	8,885	11.04
129	Kilimanoor (SC)	Bhargavi Thankappan	CPI	46,440	50.16	K. P. Madhavan	INC	38,186	41.24	8,254	8.92
130	Vamanapuram	Koliyakode N. Krishnan Nair	CPM	52,410	54.45	N. Peethambara Kurup	INC	42,294	43.94	10,116	10.51
131	Ariyanad	K. Pankajakshan	RSP	37,936	47.43	P. Vijayadas	INC	33,699	42.13	4,237	5.30
132	Nedumangad	K. V. Surendranath	CPI	47,914	48.36	Palode Ravi	INC	42,371	42.76	5,543	5.60
133	Kazhakuttam	Nabeesa Ummal	IND	45,894	49.75	Navaikulam Rasheed	IUML	32,786	35.54	13,108	14.21
134	Trivandrum North	M. Vijaya Kumar	CPM	53,167	49.99	G. Karthikeyan	INC	38,002	35.73	15,165	14.26
135	Trivandrum West	M. M. Hassan	INC	35,732	40.79	T. J. Chandra Choodan	RSP	30,096	34.36	5,636	6.43
136	Trivandrum East	K. Sankaranarayana Pillai	INS(SCS)	35,562	41.87	Kummanam Rajasekharan	IND	23,835	28.06	11,727	13.81
137	Nemom	V. J. Thankappan	CPM	47,748	50.10	V. S. Maheswaran Pillai	IND	26,993	28.32	20,755	21.78
138	Kovalam	A. Neelalohitha Dasan Nadar	LKD	54,290	57.24	N. Sakthan Nadar	INC	32,391	34.15	21,899	23.09
139	Neyyattinkara	S. R. Thankaraj	JP	45,212	47.37	K. C. Thankaraj	INC	32,148	33.68	13,064	13.69
140	Parassala	M. Sathyanesan	CPM	41,754	46.09	N. Sundaran Nadar	INC	35,062	38.70	6,692	7.39
