= Rosamma Punnoose =

Indian politician, and lawyer (1913–2013)

Member of the Kerala Legislative Assembly for Devikulam
- In office 1957–1959
- Preceded by: Position Created
- Succeeded by: Sundaram Murukandy

Member of the Kerala Legislative Assembly for Allepey
- In office 1987–1991
- Preceded by: K. P. Ramachandran Nair
- Succeeded by: K. P. Ramachandran Nair

Personal details
- Born: Rosamma Cherian; 12 May 1913 Kanjirappally, Travancore
- Died: 28 December 2013 (aged 100) Salalah, Oman
- Resting place: Pathanamthitta district, Kerala, India
- Party: Communist Party of India
- Other political affiliations: Travancore State Congress (1938–48)
- Spouse: P.T. Punnoose (m. 1946; died 1971)
- Children: 1 son and 1 daughter
- Parents: Thomman Cherian (father); Annamma Karippaparambil (mother)
- Relatives: Accamma Cherian (sister)
- Education: Madras Law College

Rosamma Punnoose (12 May 1913 – 28 December 2013) was an Indian independence activist, politician and lawyer. She was the first person to be sworn in as a member of the Kerala Legislative Assembly. She was also the first MLA in India to lose her seat following a court order, and the first person to be elected in the first-ever by-election to the assembly in 1958. Punnoose was also the first pro tem Speaker of the Kerala Legislative Assembly.

== Early life ==
Rosamma was born in Kanjirappally, Travancore on 12 May 1913 to a Catholic family, the fourth child of Kanjirapally Karippaparambil Thomman Cheriyan and Payippadu Punnakkudi Annamma.

She graduated with a degree in law from the Madras Law College.

== Career ==
She began her political career by joining the Travancore State Congress in 1938, influenced by her elder sister Accamma Cherian. Accamma Cherian was also an independence activist, and both sisters were imprisoned at Central Prison, Poojappura by the British in 1939. Rosamma was released from prison three years later.

Despite objections from her family and community, Rossamma married P.T. Punnoose, a leader of the Communist Party of India (CPI), in 1946. P.T. Punnoose was a Marthoma Syrian. No marriage between a Catholic woman and a Marthoma guy had ever occurred in the region, at the time. Besides which, Rosamma's family supported the Indian National Congress, and objected to her marrying a communist. Furthermore, P.T. Punnoose was wanted by police and authorities who were conducting a crackdown against communists at the time. As with all Christian weddings between communist couples, at the time, the two were married at a church in Cochin with a special letter of consent from the Pope. P.T. Punnoose had to be brought to the church quietly to evade police. Among the guests at the wedding was Ulloor S. Parameswara Iyer.

Rosamma joined the CPI in 1948. In the first assembly election in the state of Kerala in 1957, she was elected to the Assembly from the Devikulam constituency. Her husband had been elected to the Lok Sabha in the 1952 general election, and retained his seat in the 1957 general election, marking a rare occurrence of an elected husband and wife in Kerala politics. Rosamma was the first person to be sworn in as a member of the Assembly. She also administered the oath of office to other legislators becoming the first pro tem Speaker of the Assembly. However, Rosamma lost her seat following court intervention, but regained it in the first-ever by-election to the assembly in 1958.

Rosamma remained with the CPI when the Communist Party of India (Marxist) emerged due to a party split in 1964. She unsuccessfully contested the 1982 assembly election from Allepey constituency. In the 1987 election, Rosamma was elected to the assembly for a second time from the same constituency.

She also served as the president of Kerala Mahila Sangham (1969–83), chairperson of the Plantation Corporation (1964–69), head of the Housing Board (1975–78), and was a member of the Rubber Board for 10 years. She was the chairperson of the Kerala Women's Commission from 1993 until 1998, when she retired.

== Death ==
Rosamma died on 28 December 2013 in Salalah, Oman where she was living with her son Thomas Punnoose. Her only other child, Geetha Jacob, resided in Abu Dhabi. Her body was brought to her home in Pamala near Tiruvalla, and the funeral was held on 30 December 2013 at Sehiyon Mar Thoma Church, in Varikkad near Tiruvalla.
