= Malayali Memorial =

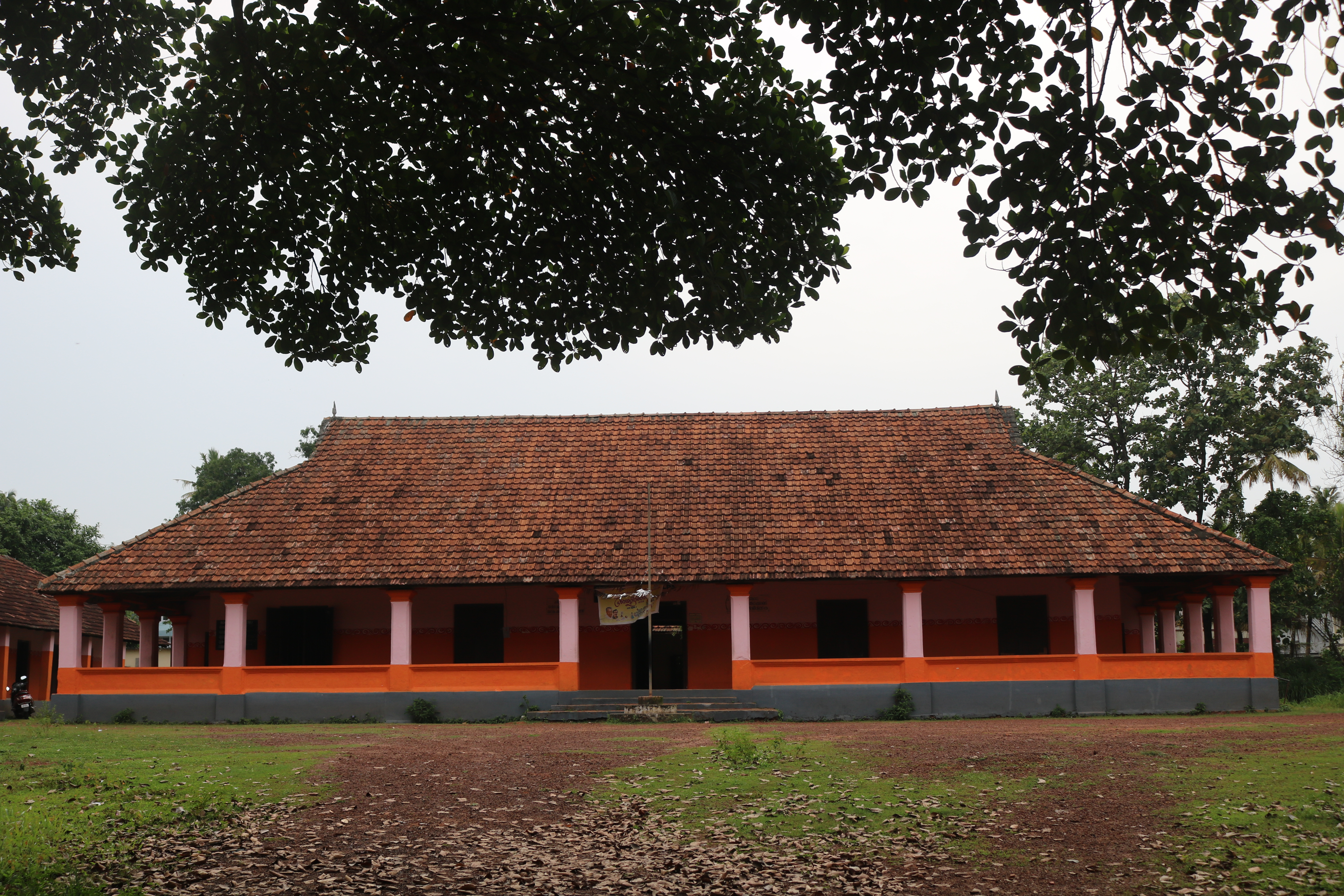

The Malayali Memorial was a petition given on 1 January 1891, during the time of Sri Moolam Thirunal Maharaja in Travancore, with the demand that Malayalis should be given importance in high official positions in Travancore.

== History ==
Only the Tamil Brahmins held high official positions in Travancore during the 19th century. Against this inequality, 10028 signatures were collected under the leadership of Barrister G. P. Pillai, K. P. Shankaramenon, Dr. Palpu, C. V. Ramanpilla, C. Krishnapillai, Kavalam Neelakanta Pillai, K. C. Shadananan Nair and gave it to the Dewan of Travancore. Among the signatories were Nairs, Ezhavas, Latin and Syrian Christians, Anglo-Indians and even a few Namboothiris. The other main demands of this petition were that local people should be given priority in jobs without regard to caste and religion and should have proportional predominance in appointments. K. P. Shankara Menon first signed the Malayali Memorial followed by GP Pillai and Dr Palpu. Eminent lawyer Eardley Norton provided legal assistance in its preparation. Malayali Memorial's flag bearer and writer C.V. Ramanpilla wrote an editorial about the Malayali Memorial in his newspaper Mithabhashi. This was later published as a book titled "Foreign Dominion". The Dewan responded negatively to the demands, saying that the Ezhavas were not sufficiently educated, and that Syrian Christians were already being inducted into the administration gradually. He opined that any change would lead to disorders amongst the communities.

== Counter Memorial ==
Meanwhile, a memorial signed by people of various sects like Tamil Brahmins, Hindu Malayalis and Christian Malayalis with the intention of demolishing the Malayali Memorial was submitted to Sri Moolam Thirunal on 3 June 1891. This came to be known as the counter memorial.

== See also ==
- Ezhava Memorial Petition
