= Accamma Cherian =

Indian independence activist (1909-1989)

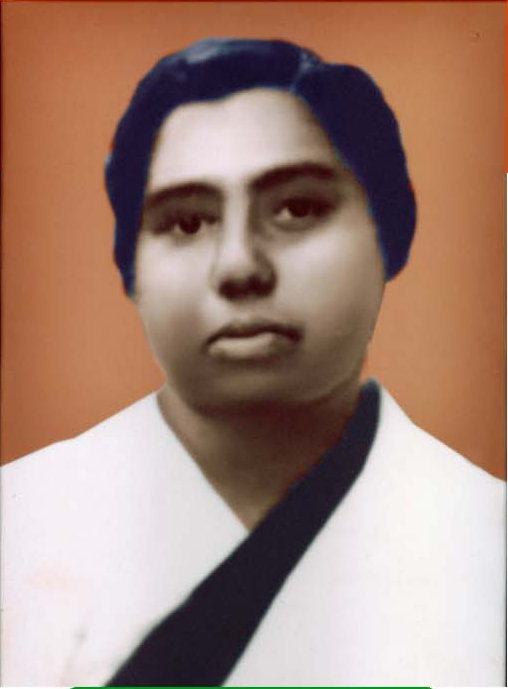
- Born: 14 February 1909; Kanjirapally, Travancore
- Died: 5 May 1982 (aged 73); Trivandrum, Kerala, India
- Political party: Indian National Congress
- Spouse: V. V. Varkey
- Parent(s): Thomman Cherian and Annamma

Akkamma Cherian (14 February 1909 – 5 May 1982) was an Indian independence activist from Travancore (Kerala), India. She was popularly known as the Jhansi Rani of Travancore.

== Freedom fighter ==
In February 1938, the Travancore State Congress was formed and Cherian gave up her teaching career to join the struggle for liberty.

=== Agitation for a responsible government ===
==== Civil disobedience movement ====
Under the State Congress, the people of Travancore started an agitation for a responsible government. C. P. Ramaswami Aiyar, the Dewan of Travancore, decided to suppress the agitation. On 26 August 1938, he banned the State Congress, which then organised a civil disobedience movement. Prominent State Congress leaders including its president Pattom A. Thanu Pillai were arrested and put behind bars.

==== Rally to the Kowdiar Palace ====
Cherian led a mass rally from Thampanoor to the Kowdiar Palace of the Maharaja Chithira Thirunal Balarama Varma to revoke a ban on State Congress. The agitating mob also demanded the dismissal of the Dewan, C. P. Ramaswami Aiyar, against whom the State Congress leaders had levelled several charges. The British police chief ordered his men to fire on the rally of over 20,000 people. Cherian cried, "I am the leader; shoot me first before you kill others". Her courageous words forced the police authorities to withdraw their orders. On hearing his news M. K. Gandhi hailed her as "The Jhansi Rani of Travancore". She was arrested and convicted of violating prohibitory orders in 1939.

==== The annual conference of the State Congress ====
The first annual conference of the State Congress was held at Vattiyoorkavu on 22 and 23 December 1932 despite the ban orders. Almost all leaders of the State Congress were arrested and imprisoned. Cherian, along with her sister Rosamma Punnose (also a freedom fighter, MLA., and a CPI leader from 1948), was arrested and jailed on 24 December 1939. They were sentenced to a year's imprisonment. They were insulted and threatened in the jail. On instructions from the jail authorities, some prisoners used abusing and vulgar words against them. This matter was brought to the notice of M.K. Gandhi by Pattom A. Thanu Pillai.

== Life in Independent India ==
In the early 1950s, when party ideologies were changing, she quit politics.

== Death and commemoration ==
Cherian died on 5 May 1982. A statue was erected in her memory in Vellayambalam, Thiruvananthapuram. A documentary film was made on her life by Sreebala K. Menon.

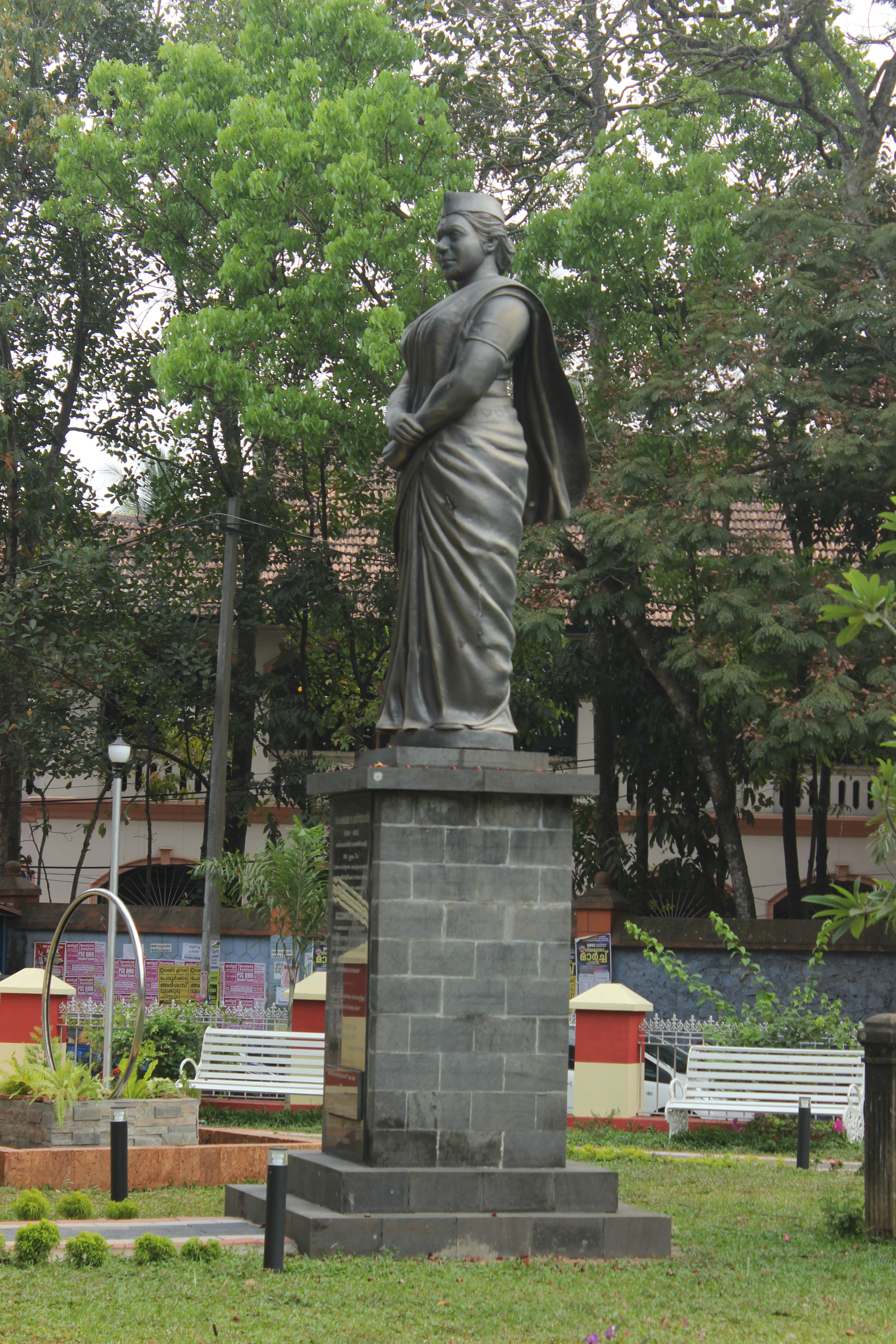
Statue of Accamma Cherian in Vellayambalam, Thiruvananthapuram.

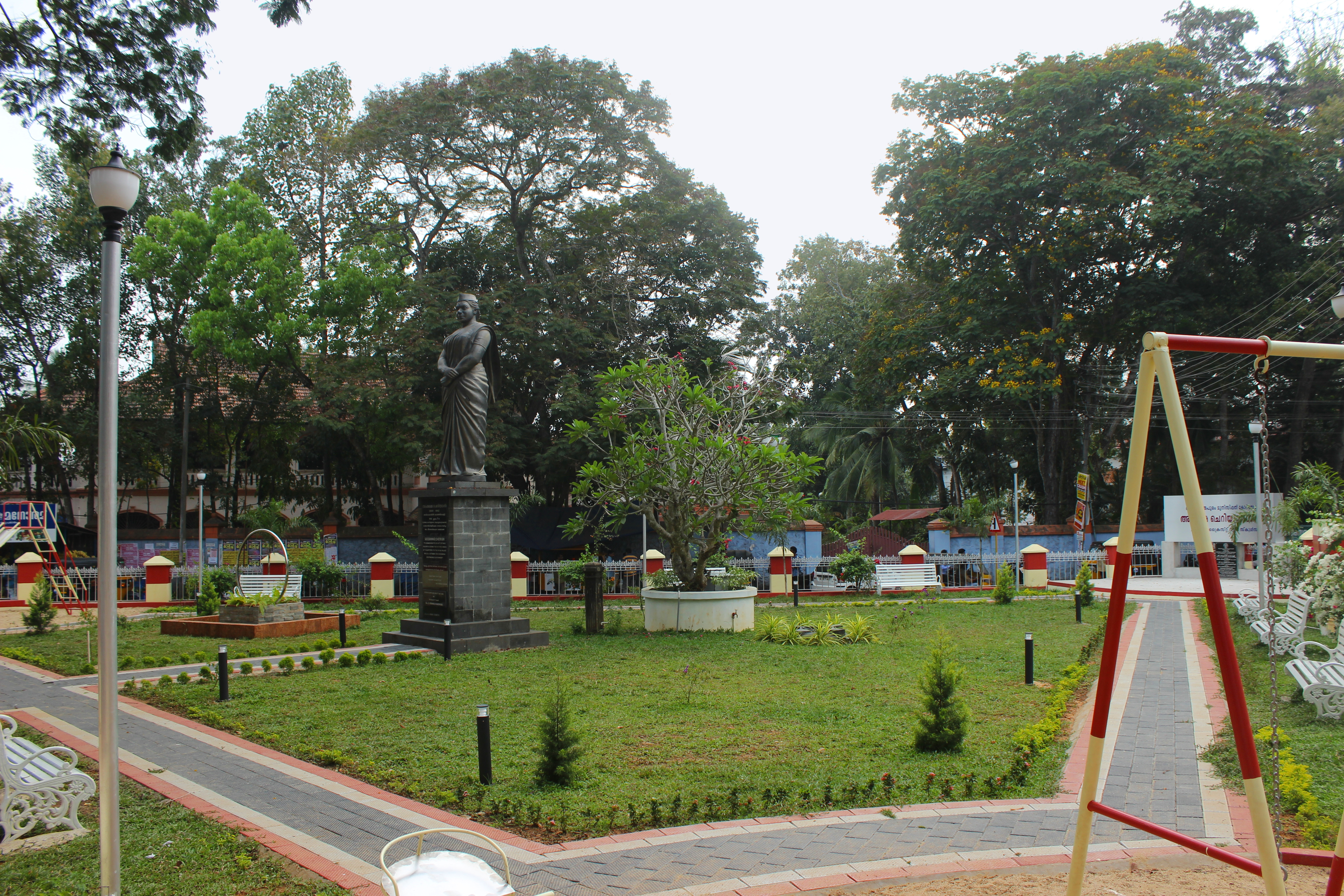
Accamma Cherian Park in Vellayambalam, Thiruvananthapuram
