= Manakkad =

- village
- Location in Kerala, India Manakkad (India)
- Coordinates: 9.8901500°N 76.654590°E
- Country: India
- State: Kerala
- District: Idukki
- Talukas: Thodupuzha

Government
  - Type: Panchayati raj (India)
  - Body: Gram panchayat

Population (2011)
  - Total: 15,106

Languages
  - Official: Malayalam, English
- Time zone: UTC+5:30 (IST)
- PIN: 685584
- Vehicle registration: KL-38
- Lok Sabha constituency: Iddukki

Manakkad is a village in Thodupuzha Taluk of Idukki District in Kerala, India, bordering Thodupuzha town on the banks of the Thodupuzha river.

== Overview ==
Its name is sometimes confused with those of Manarkad in Kottayam District and Manacaud (with the same Malayalam pronunciation as Manakkad) which is a locality in Thiruvananthapuram City. Manakkad Village also has a Panchayat known as Manakkad Panchayat.

Arikuzha is the first ward of this Panchayat and it lies in the border of Idukki and Ernakulam districts. The telephone exchange is situated in Arikuzha. Arikuzha is a natural village with lot of scenic beauties. The village consists mainly of farmers and a few planters. Majority are Hindu and Christian population with a few Muslim families. Cultivation consists of rubber plantation, rice and coconut. A rare mix of central travancore culture. The village has a good literacy rate and are continually improving the human potential in the fields of IT, nursing service and other emerging sectors

== Churches ==
There is the Saint Sebastian's church at memadangu and the small church at the arikuzha village center. There are also Pentecostal churches near such as IPC, Assemblies of God in India etc.

== Schools ==
The town centre is home to the government lower and upper primary schools. The high school is located near Saint Sebastian's Church. Both schools have large playgrounds, which become busy with games and activities in the evening. They serve as a second home for the village's young children.

== Temples ==
There is a number of temples can be seen around this place:

- Sree Narasimha Swamy Temple
- Varikkathanathu Bhagavathi Temple
- Moozhikal kavu Bhagavathi Temple
- Tottakara Sri Mahadeva Temple
- Alppara Sri Mahadeva Temple

== Government Offices ==
The District Agricultural Farm is situated here and the office is inside the farm.

== Demographics ==
As of 2011 India census, Manakkad had a population of 15106 with 7509 males and 7597 females.
