= P. T. Punnoose =

Indian politician (1911-1971)

Member of Parliament for Ambalapuzha
- In office 1952–1957
- Preceded by: Inaugural Holder
- Succeeded by: Himself

Member of Parliament for Alappuzha
- In office 1957–1962
- Preceded by: Himself
- Succeeded by: P. K. Vasudevan Nair

Personal details
- Born: 20 November 1911 Thiruvalla, Kingdom of Travancore
- Died: 1971 (aged 59–60)
- Party: Communist Party of India
- Spouse: Rosamma Punnoose
- Children: 1 son and 1 daughter

Pulimoottil Thomas Punnoose (20 November 1911 – 1971) was an Indian politician. He was elected to the Lok Sabha, the lower house of the Parliament of India from the Ambalapuzha in Kerala. Punnoose is one among the five members of Communist Party's temporary Travancore state committee set up at the 1942 Pandalam conference.

== Early life and education ==
P. T. Punnoose was born on 20 November 1911 at Thiruvalla in Travancore. His father was I. Thomas of Pulimoottil house. He was educated at Changanacherry and Trivandrum.

== Marriage and children ==
P. T. Punnoose married Rosamma Punnoose who was a Catholic and later leader of the Communist Party of India (CPI), in 1946. Punnoose was a Marthoma Syrian. No marriage between a Catholic woman and a Marthoma man had ever occurred in the region, at the time. Besides which, Rosamma's family supported the Indian National Congress, and objected to her marrying a communist. Furthermore, he was wanted by police and authorities who were conducting a crackdown against communists at the time. As with all Christian weddings between communist couples, at the time, the two were married at a church in Cochin with a special letter of consent from the Pope. He had to be brought to the church quietly to evade to police. They have two children a daughter and son.

== Political view ==
P. T. Punnoose was one of the early leaders of communist movement in Kerala. He had started his political career at Congress during the time of freedom struggle. He was attracted to ideologies of Communist Party of India. He remained in the CPI after the historical split in 1964.

== See also ==
- List of members of the 1st Lok Sabha
- List of members of the 2nd Lok Sabha
