= Mundathikode =

Mundathicode
- village
- Nickname: nmde Mundathicode
- Location in Kerala, India Mundathicode (India)
- Coordinates: 10.63157°N 76.189362°E
- Country: India
- State: Kerala
- District: Thrissur

Population (2011)
  - Total: 7,672

Languages
  - Official: Malayalam, English
- Time zone: UTC+5:30 (IST)
- PIN: 680601
- Vehicle registration: KL-48

Mundathicode is a village in Wadakkanchery municipality, Thrissur district in the state of Kerala, India.

== Demographics ==
As of 2011 India census, Mundathicode had a population of 7672 with 3700 males and 3972 females.

== Tourism ==
Pooram (Malayalam: പൂരം) is one of the most popular temple festivals of this region. Periyammakavu, Ayyapan kavu, kodasherry temple kavadi, and Pathirakottu kavu Temple Pooram are the important religious tourist destinations in this place.
