= Othera =

Othara
- village
- Location in Kerala, India
- Coordinates: 9°20′0″N 76°37′0″E
- Country: India
- State: Kerala
- District: Pathanamthitta

Government
  - Body: Kuttoor and Eraviperoor Panchayat

Languages
  - Official: Malayalam, English
- Time zone: UTC+5:30 (IST)
- PIN: 689546 (East); 689551 (West)
- Telephone Code: 0091-469-xxxxxxx
- Vehicle registration: KL-27
- Nearest airport: Cochin International Airport Trivandrum International Airport Sabarigiri International Airport (planning)
- Civic Agency: Kuttoor and Eraviperoor Panchayat

Othara or Othera is an Indian village in Kerala state. It is located in Taluk Tiruvalla, Revenue Division Thiruvalla in Pathanamthitta district.

== Bank ==
- State Bank of India
- Federal Bank
- Muthoot Fincorp
- South Indian Bank
- Federal Bank
- Kerala Bank
- KSFE

== See also ==
- Kumbanad
- Chengannur
