= National Democratic Party (Kerala) =

- Abbreviation: NDP
- Founder: Kidangoor Gopalakrishna Pillai; K. P. Ramachandran Nair
- Founded: 1974
- Dissolved: 1996; 30 years ago
- Ideology: Welfare and development of the Nair community
- Alliance: UDF (1982-1996)

National Democratic Party (NDP) was a political party in Kerala, India that existed from 1974 to 1996 and was the political arm of Nair Service Society. NDP was formed with the aim of reservation of jobs for the economically backward sections of the Nairs. Founded by Kidangoor Gopalakrishna Pillai (General Secretary of NSS), K. P. Ramachandran Nair, Kalathil Velayudhan Nair and Aranmula Kesavan Nair in 1974.

== History ==
The NSS and the NDP were together managed by Kidangoor Gopalakrishna Pillai. After Pillai was appointed as the High Commissioner of India to Singapore in 1984, he had to give up his twin posts as NSS general secretary and NDP chairman. After that Therambil Ramakrishnan became NDP chairman, while P. K. Narayana Panicker won the general secretary post.

== In assembly elections ==
National Democratic Party contested its first assembly elections in 1977 and won five assembly seats. Chathannoor Thankappan Pillai (Chengannur), N Bhaskaran Nair (Mavelikara), M P Narayanan Nair (Thiruvananthapuram East), R Sundareshan Nair (Neyyattinkara), Vattiyoorkavu Ravi (Thiruvananthapuram West) are the winners.

National Democratic Party contested in 1982 as an ally of Indian National Congress led United Democratic Front, in which it won four assembly seats. The elected members include Therambil Ramakrishnan (Thrissur), K.G.R. Kartha (Thrippunithara), K.R. Saraswathi Amma (Chengannur) and K. P. Ramachandran Nair (Alappuzha).

In the Third K. Karunakaran ministry as the nominee of Nair Service Society, K.G.R. Kartha sworn in as minister, but he was forced to step down. After Kartha's resign, in September 1983, R. Sundaresan Nair sworn in as the minister of state for health. After R. Sundaresan Nair's resignation, K. P. Ramachandran Nair took over as the minister for health.

== Dissolution ==
NDP last contested an election in 1991. The party, which contested 3 seats in the UDF front, won 2 seats. However, NDP left the UDF front in 1995 to protest against the desecration of the Mannam Samadhi Mandapam during Prime Minister P. V. Narasimha Rao's visit to Kerala. NSS dissolved the party in 1996.

== List of General Secretaries ==
- Kidangoor Gopalakrishna Pillai
- Therambil Ramakrishnan
- Upendranath Kurup
- P. K. Narayana Panicker
- G. Sukumaran Nair

== Leaders ==
- Kidangoor Gopalakrishna Pillai
- Therambil Ramakrishnan
- Upendranath Kurup
- P. K. Narayana Panicker
- K. P. Ramachandran Nair
- K. R. Saraswathy Amma
- K.G.R. Kartha
- R Sundareshan Nair
- R. Ramachandran Nair
- Chathannoor Thankappan Pillai
- N Bhaskaran Nair
- M P Narayanan Nair
- Vattiyoorkavu Ravi
- Kalathil Velayudhan Nair
- Aranmula Kesavan Nair
