= Tony Mathew =

Indian writer and orator

Tony Mathew (17 May 1949 – 19 December 2019) was an Indian writer, critic and orator, acknowledged for his contributions to Malayalam language, Indian philosophy and insights on comparative religion.

== Academic career ==
After completing his formal education from SB College Changanassery, he started a weekly magazine called Harisree and have been into book publishing sector. He later worked with Chitrakarthika, a Malayalam magazine, as an editor before joining St. Thomas College, Ranni, Kerala in 1978. He then headed the Malayalam department and retired as a professor in 2004.

He was a former member of Kerala Sahithya Academi, MG University Board of Studies and Guru Dharma Pracharana Sabha Central Committee.

== Literary career ==
Tony Mathew is an author of about 40 books which covers various topics including literary criticism, Indian philosophy, religion and biographies. His most famous work is Haindavadarsanam, a book on Indian Philosophy, Vedas and Upanishads. Haindava Dharshanam won several awards.

His other major works are Abhiveekshanam, Novel Parichayam, Mahakavi Vennikulam, Novel Paryadanam, Changanpuzha Snehichu Theeratha Gandharva Kavi, Rachanayude Rathimoorcha, Vedavaikhari, Chithaledukkhata Thaliyola Thenjupokatha Thirunarayam, Bible Arulum Porulum, Islamika Dharshanam, Ambedhkar-Ayyankali Prashnothari, Bharathathe Snehichavar, Khasak Pathanangal, MT-yude Sargaprapancham, Kaatukiliyude Paattu, Thamburushruthikal, Changanpuzha - Kinnarakaviyum Paadunna Pishachum, Sree Narayana Guru oru Punarvaayana, Kristhu Haidhava Veekshanathil, Guruprabhavam Kerala Samoohathil, Velichthinte Nurungukal, Sree Shubhananda Guru etc.

He writes for many Malayalam periodicals and is considered to be a powerful orator. He periodically conduct programs in All India Radio Trivandrum and Doordarshan Malayalam which address various social and cultural issues.

== Activism ==
In 2016, he gave evidence against the proposed establishment of an airport at Aranmula.

== Family ==
He married Lovely Jacob on 1978 and are parents of three children. Tony Mathew stayed at Vennikulam. He died on 19 December 2019 and his tomb is located at St. Johns Knanaya Jacobite Church in Thuruthicad, Vennikulam.
