= G. P. Pillai =

Indian freedom fighter and editor

Barrister G. P. Pillai
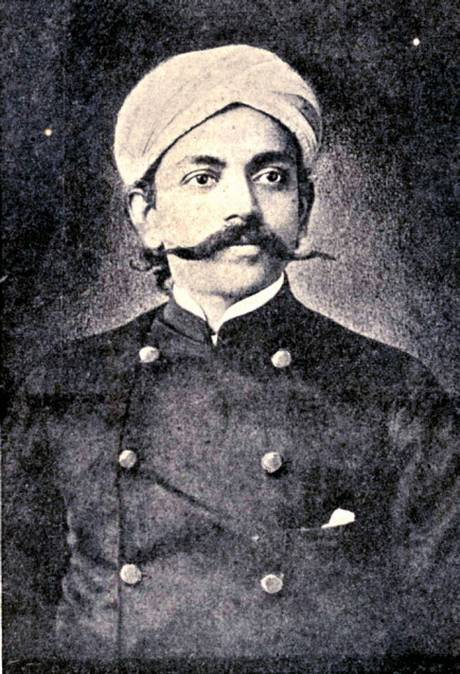
- Born: Govindan Parameswaran Pillai; 2 February 1864; Travancore (present-day Pallippuram, Trivandrum, Kerala)
- Died: 21 May 1903 (aged 39)
- Occupations: Barrister; journalist; social activist

Govindan Parameswaran Pillai (2 February 1864 – 21 May 1903), also known as Barrister G. P. Pillai, was a freedom fighter, social reformer, barrister, journalist, and publisher. He established the first English language newspaper in South India, The Madras Standard. He drafted the Malayali Memorial in 1891. Pillai is the only Malayali whom Mahatma Gandhi has mentioned in his autobiography. He regularly wrote columns in various newspapers. Pillai stood against autocratic governance in Travancore and promoted civil rights and equal opportunity among all classes.

== Early life ==
He was born on 2 February 1864 in Pallippuram, Trivandrum to a Nair family. His parents were Hariharan Iyer and Karthyayani Amma.

During his education at the University College Trivandrum, he used to write on columns of various newspapers under pseudonyms about corruption and against Tamil Brahmin migration in later Kerala. One such writing in a bi-weekly Western Star in 1883, called the attention of Diwan of Travancore who ordered to expel him from college, however, impressed by his academics, his principal gave him a recommendation letter which got him a seat at Madras Presidency College. After gaining a law degree at the Madras Presidency College he was admitted to the Middle Temple in London in 1898. He was called to the bar of Travancore High court in 1902.

== Indian freedom struggle ==
The formation of the Indian National Congress in 1885 led to increased agitation for Indian independence from British rule. G. P. Pillai was the earliest leader of the organisation from Kerala, and twice served as its General Secretary. He was well known as editor of the Madras Standard and as an activist for civil rights in Travancore State. A forceful writer and orator, he had wide contacts in Britain as well as India. Mahatma Gandhi acknowledged the help and guidance given to him by Pillai in the South African Indian issue and also in the temperance movement.

== Social activism ==
He came back from London and established the newspaper The Madras Standard. It became Mahatma Gandhi's platform to write about the grievances of Indians in South Africa. During his stay in Madras, he drafted the Travancore Memorial (also known as Malayali Memorial) in 1891, a memorandum to the Maharaja of Travancore seeking fair share of jobs to Malayali youth in government services. He was an inspiration for Padmanabhan Palpu to draft the Ezhava Memorial. He played a key role in inspiring the youth to rebel against the autocratic administration of the Diwan of Travancore. He became one of the secretaries of the Indian National Congress. Gandhi mentioned Pillai in his autobiography: "The greatest help here came to me from G. Parameswaran Pillai, the editor of the ‘Madras Standard".

Pillai is often credited as a mentor to Gandhi and as the "father of political agitation at erstwhile Travancore". In 1896, he took a letter from Swami Vivekananda to Sister Nivedita seeking her help to present the backwardness of the Thiyyas of Malabar before the British Parliament. He has stood for freedom, human dignity, and equal opportunity.

He is the only Malayali whom Mahatma Gandhi has mentioned in his autobiography. He has associated with Gandhi to present a case about Indians in South Africa. Gandhi assigned him with the case while he was studying at Inns of Court in London. During his stay in Madras, he regularly wrote in The Hindu, The Mail, and The Madras Standard. He was one of the founders of the temperance movement. In 1902, he returned to Travancore and enrolled as barrister at High Court of Travancore. He declined the offer to become a judge and was one of the leaders of the bar. According to Eardley Norton, "with him (Pillai) died a brave unselfish spirit, not lightly to be deterred from the sense of public duty by threats of social ostracism or the loss of official favour".

== See also ==
- Ayyankali
- Ayya Vaikundar
- Brahmananda Swami Sivayogi
- Narayana Guru
- Padmanabhan Palpu
- Pandit Karuppan
- Vagbhatananda
