= Perunna =

- Locality
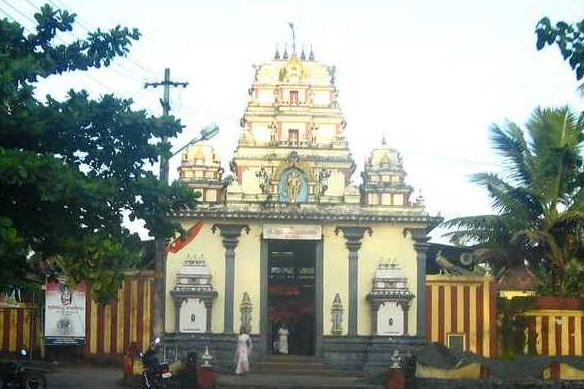
- Perunna Subrahmanya Swami Temple
- Interactive map of Perunna
- Country: India
- State: Kerala
- District: Kottayam
- Elevation: 26.76 m (87.8 ft)

Population (2011)
  - Total: 6,733

Languages
  - Official: Malayalam, English
- Time zone: UTC+5:30 (IST)
- PIN: 686102
- Vehicle registration: KL-33

Perunna is a suburb of Changanassery, Kerala, India. Perunna is located approximately 0.8 kilometres south of the town centre, at the intersection of the State Highway 1 and the State Highway 11.

Perunna is the headquarters of the Nair Service Society (NSS), and the birthplace of the famous 20th-century social reformer and freedom fighter Mannathu Padmanabhan, founder of NSS. It is also the birthplace of the famous poet Ulloor S. Parameswara Iyer.
