= Mannathu Padmanabha Pillai =

Indian social reformer and freedom fighter

Bharata Kesari Mannathu Padmanabhan
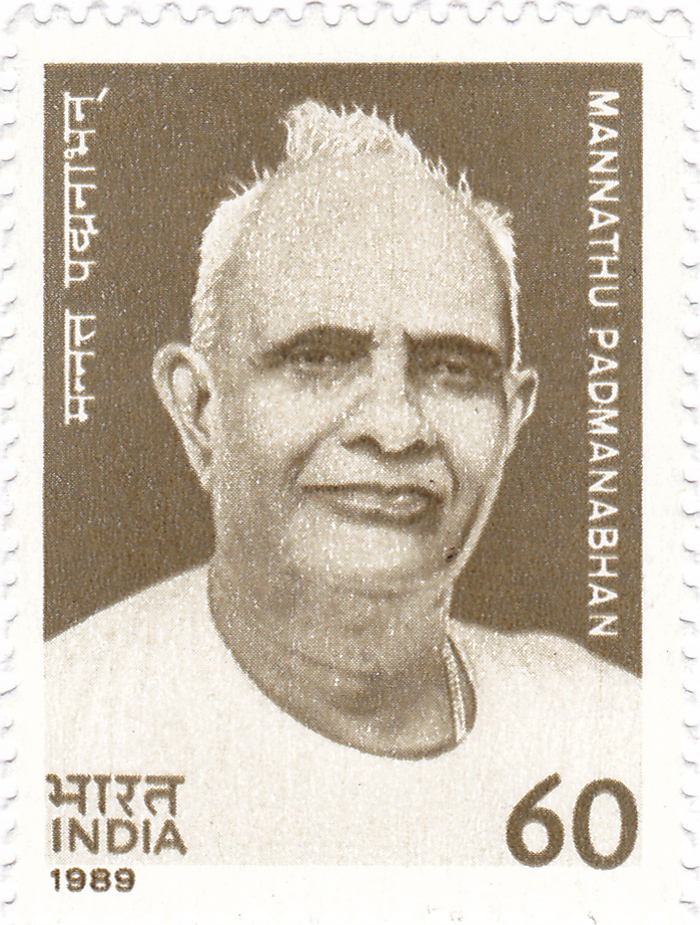
- Mannam's stamp released on 2 January 1989, by the Government of India

General Secretary of the Nair Service Society
- In office 31 October 1914 – 17 August 1945
- Preceded by: Office created
- Succeeded by: V. Gangadharan Nair

President of the Nair Service Society
- In office 18 August 1945 – 17 August 1947
- Preceded by: K. G. Parameswaran Pillai
- Succeeded by: Panampilly Govinda Menon

President of Travancore Devaswom Board
- In office 01 August 1949 – 22 May 1950
- Preceded by: Office created
- Succeeded by: P. G. N. Unnithan

Member of the United State of Travancore and Cochin Legislative Council
- In office 1 July 1949 – 28 February 1951
- Preceded by: Office created
- Succeeded by: T. Kesavan Sastry
- Constituency: Kumbazha-Vallicode (Pathanamthitta district)

Member of the Sree Moolam Popular Assembly
- In office 1921–1932

Personal details
- Born: Mannathu Padmanabha Pillai; 2 January 1878 Perunna, Changanassery, Kingdom of Travancore (present day Kottayam, Kerala, India)
- Died: 25 February 1970 (aged 92) Perunna, Changanassery, Kerala, India
- Resting place: Mannam Memorial, Changanassery
- Party: Kerala Congress (from 1964)
- Other political affiliations: Indian National Congress (until 1964)
- Spouses: Mechettu Kalyani Amma (m. 1901; died 1912); Thottakkattu Madhavi Amma (m. 1932–1968)
- Parents: Neelamana Illam Easwaran Namboothiri; Mannathu Parvathy Amma
- Occupation: Social reformer; Teacher; Lawyer; Politician

Mannathu Padmanabha Pillai (2 January 1878 – 25 February 1970), better known as Mannathu Padmanabhan, was an Indian social reformer and agitator from the south-western state of Kerala. He is recognised as the founder of the Nair Service Society (NSS), which represents the Nair community. His birthday (2 January) is observed as Mannam Jayanti every year. Padmanabhan is considered a visionary reformer who organised the Nair community under the NSS.

== Early life ==
Mannathu Padmanabhan was born in Perunna village in Changanacherry, Kottayam District, Travancore on 2 January 1878 to Easwaran Namboothiri of Nilavana Illam and Mannathu Parvathy Amma. Padmanabhan belongs to the Mannathu family, through matrilineal succession (Marumakkathayam).

He began his career as a teacher in 1893 in a Government primary school. He was the former Headmaster of a government up school North Mazhuvannoor. After a few years, from 1905 he changed his profession and started practicing law, in the Magistrates Courts.

== Nair Service Society ==
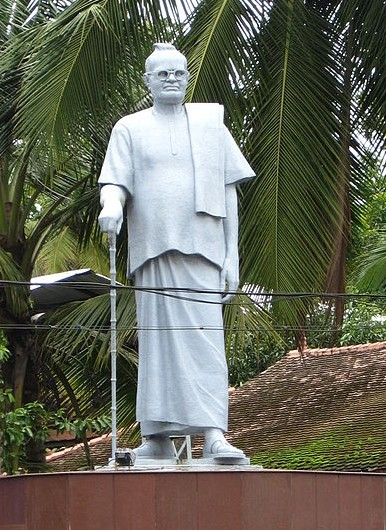
Mannam Statue at Vaikom, Kottayam

On 31 October 1914, with the help of a few others, he established the Nair Service Society. His main ambition was to uplift the status of the Nair community. Nairs were the most economically and socially dominant community in Kerala. From 1915 onwards, he gave up law practice and became the secretary of the Nair Service Society. Mannam revived and reshaped the old concept of village societies, the Karayogams, which practically set the tenor of family and village life. In 1924-25 the NSS persuaded the Travancore Government to enact the Nair Regulation which broke up the matriarchal joint family providing for paternal and maternal property to be divided among all the children.

Padmanabhan was involved with the Nair Service Society as its secretary for 31 years and as its president for three years. He was honoured with the title Bharata Kesari by the President of India. He also received Padma Bhushan in 1966.

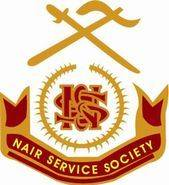
NSS Logo, Kerala

On 2 January 2022, Nair Service Society celebrated the 145th Mannam Jayanthi at NSS headquarters, Perunna in Changanassery.

== Political life ==
He fought for social equality, the first phase being the Vaikom Satyagraha, demanding the public roads near the temple at Vaikom be opened to low-caste Hindus. He took part in the Vaikom (1924) and Guruvayoor (1931) temple-entry Satyagrahas; the anti-untouchability agitations. He opened his family temple for everyone, irrespective of caste distinction. He became a member of the Indian National Congress in 1946 and took part in the agitation against Sir C. P. Ramaswamy Iyer's administration in Travancore. As the first president of Travancore Devaswom Board he revitalised many temples which had almost ceased to function. On 25 May 1947 Padmanabhan delivered his famous Muthukulam Speech at Muthukulam, Alappuzha. He was arrested for Indian Freedom Movement on 14 June 1947.

In 1949, Padmanabhan became a member of the Travancore Legislative Assembly. On 11 February 1950, he formally dropped his caste title "Pillai", stating that a name should not be an indicator of caste. In 1959, he along with Christian Churches led a united opposition against the State Communist Ministry, which became known as the Vimochana Samaram (liberation struggle). The cause of the Vimochana Samaram was the introduction of Land reforms Bill by the Minister KR Gowri, and this movement caused the dismissal of the Communist government under E. M. S. Namboodiripad on 31 July 1959. After the success of the movement he famously tethered a white horse at the Kerala Secretariat building as he had challenged to do if the dismissal was successful. The consequence of the dismissal was the beginning of President's rule in the state under Article 356 of the Indian Constitution. In 1964 he was instrumental in the formation of Kerala Congress, the first regional party in India.

== Death ==
Padmanabhan died on 25 February 1970 at the age of 92, after age related complications. Mannam memorial (or Samādhi) is located at NSS Headquarters Changanacherry. He is regarded as the reformer and moral guide of the members of Nair community.

== See also ==
- Nair Service Society
- Mahatma Gandhi College
- Mannam Memorial N.S.S College
- NSS College of Engineering
- Mannam Memorial Residential Higher Secondary School
