= Nair Service Society =

Caste based organisation in Kerala

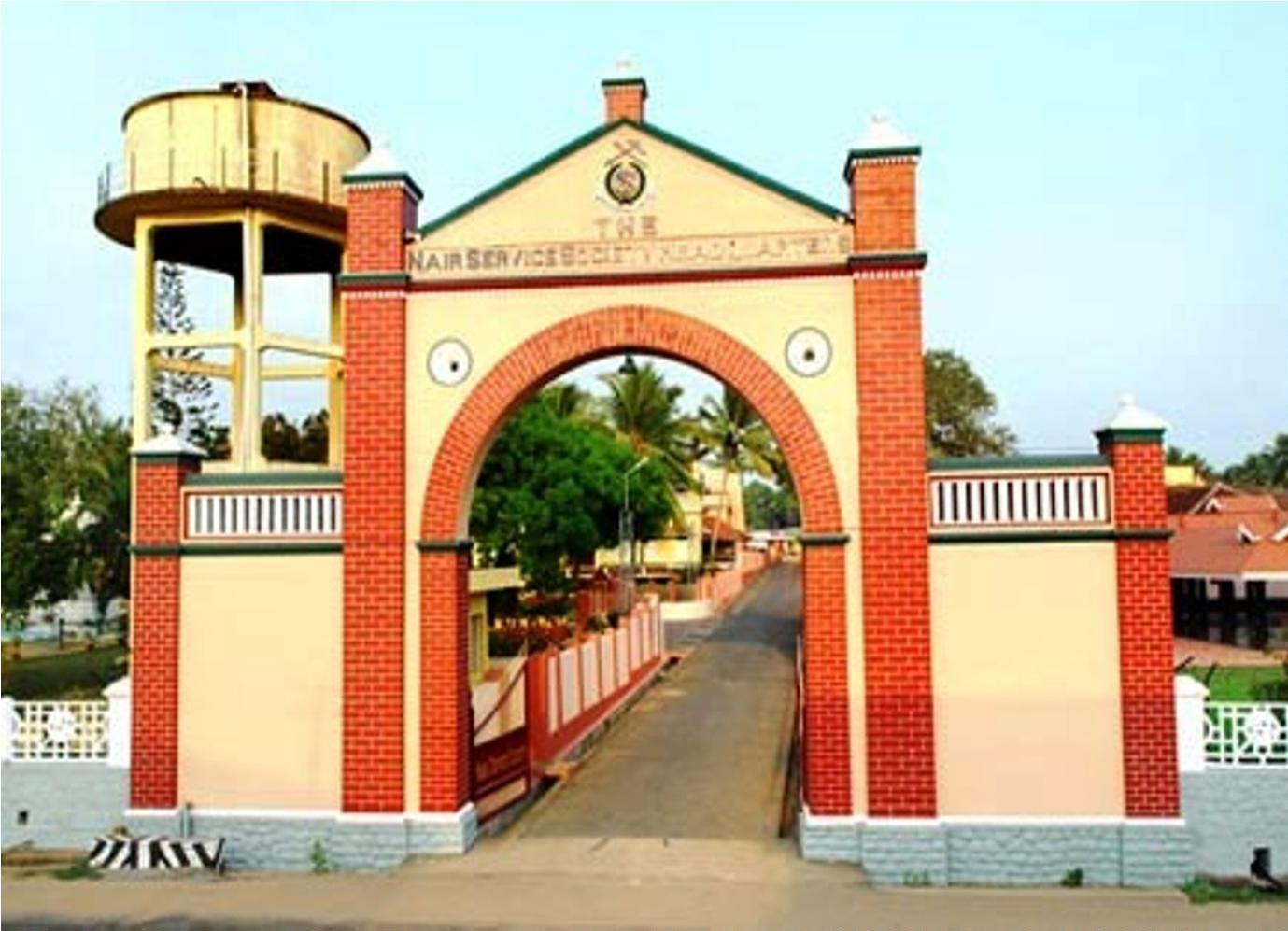
- NSS Headquarters Main Gate, Perunna
- Abbreviation: NSS
- Formation: 31 October 1914; 111 years ago
- Founder: Mannathu Padmanabha Pillai
- Type: Caste-based organization
- Legal status: Active
- Headquarters: Perunna, Changanassery
- Location: Kerala
- Official language: Malayalam
- General Secretary: G. Sukumaran Nair
- Website: nss.org.in
- Formerly called: Nair Brithya Jana Sangham (meaning, "People's Association for Leading or Serving the Nair Community")

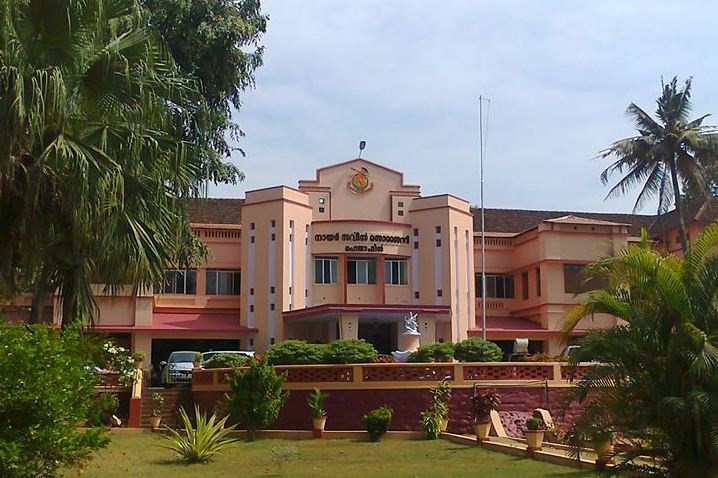
NSS Headquarters in Changanassery

The Nair Service Society (NSS) is an organisation created for the social advancement and welfare of the Nair community that is found primarily in the state of Kerala in Southern part of India. It was established under the leadership of Mannathu Padmanabha Pillai. The NSS is a three-tier organisation with Karayogams at the base level, Taluk Unions at the intermediate level and a central headquarters operating from Perunna, Changanassery in Kerala. G. Sukumaran Nair is currently the General Secretary, since June 2011.

Founded as the Nair Brithya Jana Sangham on 31 October 1914, the name was officially changed to Nair Service Society on 11 July 1915, by the advice of the prominent scholar and social reformer K. Paramu Pillai, the first person in Kerala history to earn an M.A. degree.

The Society owns and manages many educational institutions, hospitals, hostels, guesthouses, and estates.

The NSS established the National Democratic Party (NDP) in 1974 as its political arm. The party contested elections in Kerala and, at its peak, had five members elected to the Kerala Legislative Assembly. Three NDP members also served as ministers in the Government of Kerala. The party was dissolved by the NSS in 1996.

== Origins ==
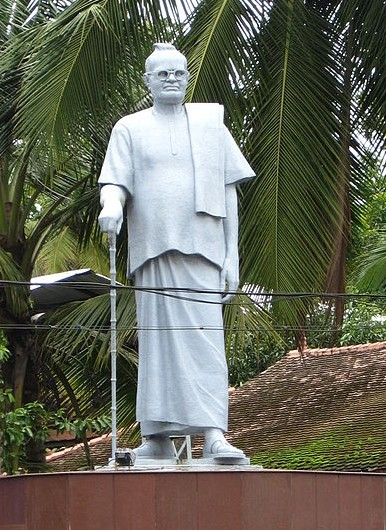
Mannathu Padmanabha Pillai, social reformer, freedom fighter and the founder of the Nair Service Society

The Nair Service Society was formed on 31 October 1914 by Mannathu Padmanabha Pillai as a reaction to perceived communal slights in the princely state of Travancore in southern India, which now forms a part of the state of Kerala. At the time of formation, K. Kelappan was the president and Mannathu Padmanabhan was the secretary. Nairs were the most economically and socially dominant community, as well as the most numerous, in what was traditionally a staunchly Hindu kingdom that rigorously and officially enforced distinctions between castes. Some Nairs had felt provoked by the rise to prominence of the Saint Thomas Christians during the era of British rule and whose members were being elected as chairs of various official bodies, this was notable because previously, during a period when the political systems were being modified, these positions were held only by Hindu Nairs or Brahmins.

The Nairs believed Travancore to be a Hindu state and the founders of the NSS believed that their own community could only counter the changing socio-political situation if it presented a united front and did away with its internal social subdivisions, to support this, Mannathu Padmanabha Pillai removed the title "Pillai" from his name, which is recognized as one of the highest statuses among the Nairs. One generation back, the high-status Nairs mostly used surnames like Pillai, Kurup, Varma, etc., while the Nair surname was relatively rare. He believed this would help remove differences among Nairs based on social status and promote unity. Its effect was significant, as many started removing their title surnames and reverted to their original caste surname, Nair, but many families in central Travancore and cochin still keep the titular surnames or interchangeably use "Nair" and Title surname to show their high esteem once they have. Now, the Nair surname is common among higher and auxiliary subcastes. (Note: The success of the NSS with regard to abolishing the subdivisions is moot: British Raj census reports of 1931 and 1941 varied in their interpretation of the available data and Christopher Fuller, an anthropologist, noted in 1975 that intermarriage between the various groups was "very rare". Fuller notes that "... many Nayars see the persistence of subdivisions within their community as a social and political problem, and they tend to deny their existence when outsidersask about them.)

== Karayogams ==
The strength of NSS lies in its 5000-plus Karayogams, which function in almost every nook and corner of the state. The NSS Karayogam movement was initiated by Mannath Padmanabhan in the Malayalam calendar year 1104 Dhanu, from the village Thattayil, with the assistance of T. P. Velukkutty Menon, who served as a unique organizer and orator. Two prestigious Nair Tharavadu in Thattayil, namely Edayirethu and Kalluzhathil, were chosen by Mannathu Padmanabhan to host the inaugural ceremony of the Karayogam Movement. Consequently, the No. 1 and No. 2 Karayogams were declared to commence operations from the village Thattayil in Adoor Taluq.

Expatriate Nairs, both in other states of India and in foreign countries, have established Nair Service Societies in their respective states and countries of residence. One such example is the Karnataka Nair Service Society, comprising 30 Karayogams. and the Kanyakumari Nair Service Society with 27 Karayogams, NSS Vidarbha, which unites Nairs living in the Vidarbha region of Maharashtra. NSS is also having branches in Nagpur, Chandrapur and NSS of North America (NSSONA) with many Karayogams in North America. In Qatar there's an outfit of it called KSCA affiliated with aegis of the embassy.

In October 2010, Nair organizations from around the world decided to establish a united body. Subsequently, the Global Nair Service Society was founded during a meeting attended by thousands in New Delhi.

== Strength ==
As of 2010 the NSS comprised:

- Taluk Unions : 58
- Karayogams (village/urban communities) : 5300
- Vanitha Samajams : 4232
- Bala Samajams : 2466

NSS has also started many schools under its supervision directly and also under many of its units like Taluk Unions and Karayogams. Collectively named NSS HSS or NSS High Schools, these schools function in almost all parts of the state of Kerala.

The official organ of the organization is a bi-weekly named 'SERVICE' - which has completed its 100 years in 2019.

== Founding Members ==
- K. Kelappan, founding President
- Mannathu Padmanabha Pillai, founding General Secretary
- Kondoor Krishna Pillai, former General Secretary of NSS
- Kakkanattu Narayana Panicker, former Treasurer of NSS and a veteran freedom fighter
- Thaliyil Madhavan Pillai, former member of Sree Moolam Popular Assembly, Judge of Panchayat Court and a veteran freedom fighter
- Poduvadathu Padmanabha Pillai, former Chairman of Changanassery Municipality and Manager of 'Service' magazine
- Nynadathu Thrivikrama Kaimal, former Chairman of Changanassery Municipality, Senior Judge of Changanassery Munisiff Court and a Member of Sree Moolam Popular Assembly
- Mannathu Parvathy Amma, mother of Mannathu Padmanabhan
- Panakkat Parameswara Kurup, a freedom fighter and a disciple of Mahatma Gandhi. He played a vital role in propagating khadi
- Padinjare Nenmeli Krishna Pillai
- Kottanattil Padmanabha Pillai, former General Secretary of NSS
- Panangottu Kesava Panicker, former Treasurer of NSS
- Nagavallil Kochukunju Kurup, former member of Sree Moolam Popular Assembly
- Pallipuram V. Narayana Pillai
- Valparambil Velayudhan Pillai
- Elikuzha Kesava Pillai, former Tehsildar

== Former Officers ==
- Sri. Mannathu Padmanabha Pillai
- Sri. V. Gangadharan, Quilon
- Sri. Kondoor Krishna Pillai
- Sri. M.P. Manmadhan
- Sri. Makkapuzha P.S. Vasudevan Pillai
- Sri. N. Parameswaran Pillai
- Sri. Kidangoor. A.N. Gopalakrishna Pillai
- Sri. R.P. Nair
- P.K. Narayana Panicker

=== Presidents List ===
- K.Kelappan
- Parameswaran Pillai
- Vaikom Ramakrishna Pillai
- Ambalapattu Damodaran Asan
- Puthuppally S Krishna Pillai
- G.Narayana Pillai
- Dr.Kunjan Pillai
- K.P.Gopala Menon
- Dr.K.P.Panicker
- K.G.Parameswaran Pillai
- Mannathu Padmanabhan
- N.Govinda Menon
- V.K.Velappan
- Ambalappattu Damodaran Asan
- Dr.V.R.Narayanan Nair
- Kalathil Velayudhan Nair
- Makkapuzha P.S.Vasudevan Pillai
- C.K.Sivasankara Panicker
- Panampilly Raghava Menon
- N.Bhaskaran Nair
- K.P.Karunakara Menon
- PV Neelakanta Pillai
- P.K. Narayana Panicker

== Current Board of Directors ==
- President: Dr. M. Sasikumar, Kottinattu Bungalow, Kannambally Bhagam, Kayamkulam, Alappuzha
- General Secretary: Sri G. Sukumaran Nair, Kottayam
- Treasurer: Sri N.V. Ayyappan Pillai, Kollam
- Vice President: Sri. M. Sangeeth Kumar, Thiruvananthapuram
- Board Member (Agriculture Secretary): Sri. Harikumar Koyickal, Kottayam
- Board Member: Sri. M.S. Mohan, Advocate, Kottayam
- Board Member: Sri. M.M. Govindankutty, Ernakulam
- Board Member: Chithara S. Radhakrishnan, Kollam
- Board Member: Sri. K.R. Sivankutty, Pathanamthitta
- Board Member: Sri. C.P. Chandran Nair, Kottayam
- Board Member: Dr. G. Gopakumar, Kollam
- Board Member: G. Madhusoodanan Pillai, Trivandrum
- Board Member: V.A Baburaj, Swathi, Trivandrum
- Board Member: G. Thankappan Pillai, Kollam
- Board Member: K.P. Narayana Pilla, Kottayam
- Board Member: M.P. Udayabhanu, Kannur
- Board Member: Sri. P.N. Sukumara Panicker, Alappuzha
- Board Member: Prof. Madavana Balakrishna Pillai, Kottayam
- Board Member: Sri. P. Narayanan, Palakkad
- Board Member: Prof. Elanjiyil Radhakrishnan, Alappuzha
- Board Member: Adv. A. Suresan, Thrissur
- Board Member: Adv. A. Balakrishnan Nair, Kasargod
- Board Member: Adv. Sreesakumar, Ernakulam
- Board Member: Adv. V. Vijulal, Alappuzha
- Board Member: Adv. R. Haridas Edathitta, Pathanamthitta
- Board Member: K.B. Ganeshkumar, Kollam
- Board Member: R. Mohankumar, Ponmelil, Pathanamthitta
- Expert Additional Member: P. Hrishikesh, Thrissur

== Institutions under NSS ==
- Civil Service Academy (NACS)
- 26 Colleges affiliated with different universities in Kerala
- 70 High schools
- 33 Higher Secondary Schools
- 24 Upper Primary Schools
- 12 Lower Primary schools
- 15 Unaided English Medium Schools
- 7 Unaided Higher Secondary Schools
- 2 Vocational Higher Secondary Schools
- 4 Teachers Training Institutes
- Balabhavans
- Medical Mission Hospitals
- 8 Estates
- 5 Guest houses
- 16 Working Women's Hostels
- 3 Co-Operative Societies
- Industrial Units, etc.

== See also ==
- List of Nairs
- Pattom Thanupillai
- C. Krishna Pillai
- List of Nair Service Society educational institutions
- Nair
- Chattampi Swamikal
- Mannathu Padmanabha Pillai
- G. Sukumaran Nair
- M. Susheelan Nair
- P. K. Narayana Panicker
