= Assembly of Believers' Church In India =

The Assembly of Believers' Church In India (also known as ABC in India) is a neocharismatic Episcopal denomination in India, rooted in the Saint Thomas Christian tradition and history of Christianity in India. It was established in 1973 by Reginald Burney Clifford and now contains more than 800 churches with around 90000 members.

The Assembly of Believers' Church in India is not to be confused with the Believers Church, a separate church entity in Asia.

== Proposal ==
There is a proposal to unite to form Church of India, comprising following churches:

1. Orthodox Catholic Church (India)
2. Church of South India
3. Church of North India
4. St. Thomas Evangelical Church of India
5. Believers Eastern Church, of Metropolitan Bishop K. P. Yohannan
6. Life Boat Church, of Rev. P. Sumit Joshi, Life Boat Foundation India
7. Assembly of Believers' Church In India, of Bishop Rev. Bishop Augustus Anthony
8. Anglican Church of India, of Bishop Stephen Vattapara
9. Anglican Catholic Church (Church of India, Pakistan, Burma & Ceylon / CIPBC), of Bishop John Augustine
10. The Traditional Anglican Church of India, of Bishop Bishop Hepworth and Bishop Samuel. P. Prakash
11. Anglican National Church of India, of Bishop Jonathan Anzar
12. United Church of India, of Bishop Sunny Abraham Panachamootil
