= Chumathra =

Locality in India

- Ward
- Location in Kerala, India Chumathra (India)
- Country: India
- State: Kerala
- District: Pathanamthitta

Population (2011)
  - Total: 2,003

Languages
  - Official: Malayalam, English
- Time zone: UTC+5:30 (IST)
- PIN: 689103
- Telephone code: 0469
- Vehicle registration: KL-27
- Lok Sabha constituency: Pathanamthitta

Chumathra is a ward of Thiruvalla, Kerala, located approximately 1.5 kilometres north of the town centre. It falls within the boundaries of the Kuttappuzha P.O. pincode (689103). Chumathra is a primarily residential area located west of the Thiruvalla-Mallapally Road, and has a small shopping area located along the Muthoor-Chumathra Road.

Chumathra is the location of the Chumathra Sree Mahadeva Temple. It is also the location of the headquarters of the Believers Eastern Church and its campus, including the Believers Church Medical College Hospital and the Believers Church Residential School.

== Government ==
Chumathra falls under the jurisdiction of Thiruvalla municipality. It is registered as Ward number 2, with a female reservation. The ward councilor is Bindhu Prakash, elected from the CPI(M) party.

== Demographics ==
As per the 2011 Indian census, Chumathra has a total population of 2003, and 469 households. Of the population, 49.13% are male and 50.87% are female. 8.13% of the population is under 6 years of age. Scheduled Castes constitute a high proportion of the population at 20.47%, compared to 8.49% for Thiruvalla on average. There are no Scheduled Tribes present.

The total literacy rate in 2011 was 89.62% (90.55% for males and 88.71% for females), which was lower than the state average of 94% and higher than the national average of 74.04%.

== Education ==
The Chumathra Government U.P. School provides services to the local population.

The Believers Church Residential School is a private institution run by the Believers Eastern Church and affiliated with the Central Board of Secondary Education.

== See also ==
- Kizhakken Muthoor
- Kuttappuzha
- Thiruvalla
