= Mar Thoma College, Tiruvalla =

College in Kerala, India

- College Crest
- Other names: MTC
- Motto in English: Education par Excellence and Educated for the Society
- Established: 1952; 74 years ago
- Religious affiliation: Malankara Mar Thoma Syrian Church
- Academic affiliations: Mahatma Gandhi University, UGC
- Principal: Dr. Mathew Varkey T. K.
- Manager: Rt. Rev. Dr. Euyakim Mar Coorilos Suffragan Metropolitan
- Academic staff: 80
- Administrative staff: 45
- Students: 1800
- Undergraduates: 1300
- Postgraduates: 450
- Doctoral students: 50
- Location: Tiruvalla, Pathanamthitta, Kerala, India; 9°24′2.45″N 76°35′5.6″E
- Website: mtct.ac.in

Mar Thoma College is an institution of higher education located in Tiruvalla in the south Indian state of Kerala. The college is affiliated with Mahatma Gandhi University and offers 12 undergraduate, 10 post-graduate, and 7 doctoral programmes. The college is accredited by the National Assessment and Accreditation Council (NAAC).

== Overview ==
Mar Thoma College was founded by the Mar Thoma Syrian Church of Malabar in 1952 as a junior college offering two intermediate courses. Dr. Alexander Mar Thoma Metropolitan (Rev. M. G. Chandy) was the school's founding principal. It has been affiliated with the University of Kerala since its inception. When Mahatma Gandhi University was established in 1983, the college was brought under its affiliation, and two years later, two of the departments of the college, English and Zoology, were recognized as research centers to commence doctoral programs.

In 1998, the National Assessment and Accreditation Council extended accreditation to the college, making it the first college in Kerala and one of the first colleges in India to receive NAAC accreditation. The college was re-accredited with an A Grade in 2005, and the central government accreditation agency retained the grading at A during its reassessment in 2012. The NAAC extended the period of accreditation to seven years (till 2019) as the college obtained the highest possible grades in two consecutive accreditations. The college retains A grade in the fourth cycle of accreditation.

The college is a member of the United Nations Academic Impact (UNAI) and the All India Association of Christian Higher Education. It hosted the 29th Kerala Science Congress in 2017. Distinguished faculty members of the college include Dr. Alexander Mar Thoma Metropolitan (Rev. M. G. Chandy), Padma Shri Samuel Paul (an Indian scholar and economist, former visiting professor at Harvard Business School, and advisor to the World Bank and the UN Commission on Transnational Corporations), Dr. A.V. Varghese, and Dr. J.V. Vilanilam, both former Vice Chancellors.

The college campus is located in Kuttappuzha, a small hamlet in Tiruvalla, known for the Sreevallabha Temple, one of the oldest temples in Kerala. Tiruvalla town is 2 km away and the distance to the state capital, Thiruvananthapuram and the commercial city of Kochi are 120 km and 89 km respectively. The campus is near to many centres of pilgrimage such as Niranam Church, Kaviyoor Mahadevar Temple and Parumala Church, besides the Sreevallabha Temple.

The college is coeducational and has a student strength of about 1800. The administration is under a manager deputed by the Mar Thoma Syrian Church and is headed by a principal who is assisted by 80 teaching and 45 non teaching staff. It offers 12 under graduate, 10 post graduate, seven doctoral and many other non formal programmes.

== Departments ==
The academics is sectioned into independent departments based on subjects of instruction such as English, Malayalam, Hindi, Mathematics, Statistics, Physics, Chemistry, Botany, Zoology, Economics, History, Political Science, Commerce, Physical Education and Bio-Sciences. Non teaching programmes have a separate department handling them while non formal computer educational programmes are handled by Mar Thoma College Institute of Computer Sciences, a subsidiary functioning under the same management.

== Notable alumni ==
- Theodosius Mar Thoma XXII Mar Thoma Metropolitan, supreme head of the Malankara Mar Thoma Syrian Church
- John Abraham, film director, short story writer, and screenwriter
- Prasanth Alexander, Actor, Malayalam Film Industry
- S Suresh Babu, Screen writer, Malayalam Film Industry
- Gibu George, Actor, Malayalam Film Industry
- Stanley George, Political strategist and consultant
- K. C. Joseph, Politician
- Kurian John Melamparambil, Philanthropist, industrialist and writer
- Kaviyoor Murali, Dalit activist, writer and folklore researcher
- Nayanthara (born Diana Mariam Kurian), Actress (South India Film industry)
- K. N. Ninan, Space Scientist, Vikram Sarabhai Space Centre
- Kaviyoor Sivaprasad, National Film Award Winner, film director, writer, and actor
- Sidhartha Siva, National Film Award Winner, film director, writer, and actor
- Blessy Ipe Thomas, film director and writer
- K. George Thomas, Shanti Swaroop Bhatnagar Awardee
- Mathew T. Thomas, Politician
- Vishnu Vinod, Kerala and Royal Challengers Bangalore wicket keeping batsman

== See also ==
- List of colleges affiliated with Mahatma Gandhi University
