= Kerala Council of Churches =

- Abbreviation: KCC
- Formation: 1940
- Type: NGO
- Purpose: Ecumenism
- Headquarters: Thiruvalla
- Location: Kerala
- Region served: Kerala
- Members: (2015)
- Official language: Malayalam
- Secretary General: Adv. Prakash P Thomas
- President: H. G. Alexios Mar Eusebius Church of South India
- Key people: Mr. Shibi Peter, Major Asha Justin, Dini Eldho
- Parent organization: NCCI
- Subsidiaries: 15 churches and 21 organizations
- Affiliations: National Council of Churches in India
- Website: www.keralacouncilofchurches.org

Kerala Council of Churches or KCC is a regional ecumenical organisation of the Protestant and Oriental Orthodox Churches in Kerala, India. KCC is an affiliate of the National Council of Churches in India. Its constitution states "The Kerala Council of Churches is autonomous and inter-confessional, comprising Churches in Kerala and Christian Organization". The jurisdiction of the council is also limited by the constitution to the state of Kerala.

Kerala council of Churches has 15 member churches or dioceses from Kerala along with more than 21 member organizations working within Kerala. The four dioceses of the Church of South India (CSI) within Kerala are separate members in the council as well as the Malankara Jacobite Syrian Orthodox Church and its Knanaya Archdiocese having separate memberships as well.

== Structure ==
=== Triennial General Assembly ===
The general assembly of the council is held every three years with delegates from each of the member churches and associated organisations where matters relating to the election of the presidium, membership, organisations are deliberated and decided along with a common theme which is studied and explored.

The last Triennial was held at the Joseph Marthoma Camp Centre, Kombadi, Thiruvalla from 14 to 16 November 2019. The theme for this assembly was "God who listens to the Cries of the Margins"

Due to COVID-19 and subsequent events the triennial which is due in 2022 has not taken place as on date.

=== Executive Committee and the Presidium ===
It is in the General assembly that the presidium and the executive committee of the Kerala Council of Churches is elected from the delegates sent by each of the member church and organizations. Each church can nominate one or two of their delegates as the executive committee members depending on their demographic size.

The executive committee meets in between the three years to decide upon matters that arise.

=== Office Bearers ===
President: Most. Rev. Alexios Mar Eusebius

==== Vice Presidents ====
- Mr. Shibi Peter
- Major Asha Justin
- General Secretary: Adv. Prakash P. Thomas

== Member Churches ==
1. Believers Eastern Church
2. Chaldean Syrian Church
3. Church of God in South India
4. CSI East Kerala Diocese
5. CSI Madhya Kerala Diocese
6. CSI North Kerala Diocese
7. CSI South Kerala Diocese
8. St. Thomas Evangelical Church of India Fellowship
9. Jacobite Syrian Christian Church
10. Malabar Independent Syrian Church
11. Malankara Orthodox Syrian Church
12. Malankara Syrian Knanaya Archdiocese
13. Malankara Mar Thoma Syrian Church
14. The India Evangelical Lutheran Church
15. Bible Faith Mission Church The Salvation Army Church

== Emblem ==
The Emblem of the Council consists of a circular image with a coconut tree, sea and a boat with the motto "You shall be my Witness" engraved around.

== Desks ==
There are five desks handling five areas that are deemed important by the KCC. Each desk is headed by a faculty elected by the executive committee of KCC.

- Youth and Communication Desk /EYF
- Women and Ecology Desk /EWF
- Dalit, Tribal and Social Concerns Desk
- Faith & Unity, Dialogue, and Pastoral & Evangelistic Desk
- Education and Current Affairs Desk

== Commissions and Regional Zones ==
The council has constituted various commissions to give particular attention to issues that need extra attention. The commissions are headed by chairpersons elected from the delegates at the General assembly. Commissions on Youth, Social Concern, Dialogue, Women, Environment, Current Affairs, and Education currently function.

The council also has various regional zones in the different parts of the Kerala state. They include Thiruvalla, Trivandrum, Ernakulam, Ranni, Kollam, Aluva, Kumbanad, Malappuram, Kottayam, Kottarakkara etc.
