= Kurian John Melamparambil =

Indian humanitarian and entrepreneur

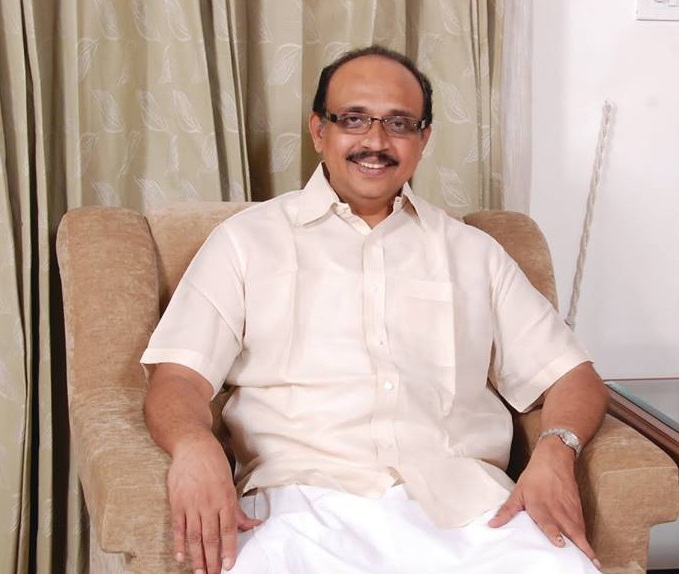
- Padmashree Kurian John Melamparambil
- Born: 14 May 1954 (age 71); Tiruvalla, Travancore Cochin, India
- Occupations: Entrepreneur, humanitarian
- Spouse: Sujatha
- Children: Divya, Dhanya
- Parent(s): Varghese John; Leelamma
- Awards: Padma Shri
- Website: melamfoundation.org

Kurian John Melamparambil is an Indian philanthropist, industrialist and writer from Kerala. He is the founder and chief promoter of Melam Group of Companies and the Melam Foundation. With his own generated funds, he has provided free medical treatment to over 158,000 poor patients through 1050 hospitals. He was honoured by the Government of India, in 2010, for his services to the social cause, with the fourth highest civilian award, the Padma Shri.

== Background ==
Humanitarianism is not charity, says Kurian John Melamparambil, but is a moral and social obligation of each and every individual and institution

Kurian John Melamparambil was born on 14 May 1954 as the second son of Late John V. Melamparambil (Kunju Kunju) and Leelamma into the 'Melamparambil', a traditional business family of Tiruvalla, a central Kerala town. His early childhood and schooling days, both primary and senior level, were at M.G.M High School, Tiruvalla where he spent time with the family members and imbibed great values from the family elders. After schooling, he joined Pre-degree course in Mar Thoma College, Tiruvalla (1970–72) and from Mar Ivanios College, Thiruvananthapuram he completed his Graduation and obtained a Bachelor of Arts degree majoring in Economics (1972–75). He then moved to the Indore School of Social Work, Indore and completed his Post Graduate Degreein social work (MSW) in 1978.

== Philanthropy ==
He entered into business in order to generate funds for carrying out charitable activities.

All applicants for medical assistance from the Melam foundation are met and interviewed before disbursement of any assistance. He personally meets each patient/relative, however large the turnout is. He also provides food on those days to the patients and their relatives.

It is a wholly private activity with no Government funds or public funds or involvement. 48 MP's (both Lok Sabha and Rajya Sabha) from the State of Kerala, 138 MLA's out of 140 from the Kerala Legislative Assembly, and from the border district of Tamil Nadu and Karnataka, and around 18,000 Councilors/Panchayath members in Kerala have already participated in the selection process.

Kurian John Melamparambil's work has resulted in establishing a network of more than 1025 hospitals across the state for providing specialized treatment to the sponsored patients within a 30 days credit period for reimbursement from him.

== Awards and recognitions ==
Kurian John Melamparambil has been honoured with several awards and recognitions during his career.

- Padma Shri – 2010
- Outstanding Entrepreneur of the Year 1997 – the Ministry of Commerce and Industry, Government of India.
- Times of India Excellence in Business Award – Times of India Group – 2009
- Outstanding National award in Exports – the Ministry of Commerce and Industry, Government of India – 1993–94, 1994–95, 1995–96 and 1996–97
- Baroda Sun Lifetime Achievement National Award -2015 (Cash award of Rs. 5 lakhs) for excellence in Social Service from Bank of Baroda.
- For the Sake of Honor Award – the Rotary Club International – 2011
- Personality Brand of Kerala Award 2019 instituted by Samrambham Business Magazine
- Bright Star Recognition Award 2020 from Kidney Warriors Foundation and Kerala Kidney Foundation
- Dr. B. R. Ambedkar Healthcare Excellence Award 2020, Karnataka for the outstanding service in the field of Healthcare
- Award of Excellence 2020 from Global Kidney Foundation, UK for dedicated service to poor patients
- Goldstar Millennium Award – Global Economic Council, New Delhi
- Rashtriya Ratan Award – 1999
- Outstanding Entrepreneur of the Year – 1998 – Berchmans Institute of Management Studies, M G University, Kottayam, Kerala
- Gold Star Award – The Institute of Economic Studies, New Delhi – 1994
- Bharat Vikas Excellence Award – the Council for National Development, New Delhi – 1997
- Niryat Ratan Award – Indian Council for Small and Medium Exporters, New Delhi – 1994
- Udyog Ratna Award – the Institute of Economic Studies, New Delhi.
- International Gold Star Award – Business Initiative Directions, Spain – 2007 a vanity award
- Vocational Excellence Award – Rotary Club, Alappuzha – 2007
- Humanitarian Millennium Award – International YMCA – South West Region
- Excellence Award – Lions Club International – 2003 and 2004
- Sree Gokulam Excellence Award – 2003
- Outstanding Social Worker Award – Sri Sankaracharya Educational Trust, Kaladi, Kerala
- Janaseva Deshiya Puraskaram – Mahatma Gandhi International Charities Trust, Kerala – 2003
- JCI Award – Indian Junior Chamber- 1994
- Athuraseva Ratnam Award – Gandhibhavan International Trust – 2008
- Adv. Mammen Mathai MLA Award – Merchant's Association, Kochi – 2009
- Rhema Foundation International Award – Rhema Foundation International – 2010
- Karmakeerthi Puraskaram – Kalanidhi Centre for Arts, Culture and Research, Trivandrum – 2012
- Voice of Gulf Returnees Excellence Award – 2012
- Best Citizens of India Award – the Best Citizens of India, New Delhi – 1998
- Cherian Palathara Award- 2011 from Cherian Palathra Foundation for outstanding Entrepreneurship and Corporate Social Responsibility.
- CSR Award 2012 - from Bharata Mata Institute of Management "Xlencia 12" for the exemplary performance in the field of social work through business
- Business Excellence Award -2015 for consistent C.S.R initiative from D.C. Media, D.C. Books.
- Georgian Award 2016 from St. George Orthodox Cathedral, Pandalam for outstanding social work.

== Published works ==
Melamparambil has published a few memoirs, which narrates his life through business, spirituality, and charity.

- Kurian John Melamparambil (2005). Melam Ente Jeevante Thalam. DC Books. ASIN B007E4XRS2.
- "Yesu ente vazhikatti", spiritual memoirs of Kurian John Melamparambil.
- "Zero to Zenith" - Start-Up story published by Penguin Random House 2017.
