= Kaviyoor Murali =

Indian Dalit activist (1931–2001)

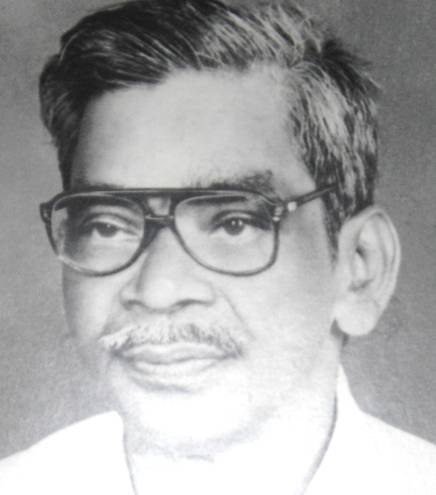
- Born: 20 March 1931; Kaviyoor, Pathanamthitta District, Kerala, India
- Died: 20 October 2001 (aged 70); Kaviyoor
- Occupations: Dalit Activist, Writer, Folklore Research Person
- Notable work: Dalit Sahithyam, Dalitharkkezhuthiya Suvishesham, Purananooru- Oru Padhanam, Dalit Bhasha
- Spouse: Thankamma
- Children: Dante, Daisen, Asha, Beecy

Kaviyoor Murali (20 March 1931 – 20 October 2001) was an Indian Dalit activist, writer and folklore researcher from Kerala, India.

== Life ==
Murali was born on 20 March 1931 in Kaviyoor, Tiruvalla, Pathanamthitta District, Kerala. He was an Ambedkarite activist. Familiar among all Dalit Activists and Folklore Groups. He studied at Kaviyoor N.S.S. English High School, Thiruvananthapuram Intermediate College and Mar Thoma College, Tiruvalla.

In 1953, he was a Full Member and a Full Time worker of Communist Party. Participated actively in the strike to avail trade union rights for the State Transport Workers in 1954. Undergone brutal torture by the police, after arrest and imprisonment. Started career as a teacher. Later, retired as a Superintendent in Public Works Department.

== Honours ==
Honoured with the Fellowship of Bharatiya Dalit Sahithya Academy, New Delhi. An honorary photograph was unveiled in the Kerala Sahithya Akademy Hall in 2003.

== Prominent works ==
- Vayalchullikal (Field shrubs) - Collection of poems.
- Darsanam (Vision)- collection of poems.
- Dalitharkkezhuthiya Suvishesham (Gospel to the Dalits)
- Purananooru - Oru Padhanam (Purananooru - a Study)
- Dalit Bhasha (Dalit Language) - Study
- Ayyankalippada (Ayyankali Fighters) - Novel
- Dalit Sahithyam (Dalit Literature)
- Dalitbhashalaghunighandu (A dictionary of Dalit Language)- published by DC Books Kottayam
- Sugandhi - (Novel, unpublished)
- MunisomKa (Autobiography, published by Rainbow Book Publishers, Chengannur)
- Velutha (Wheatish) - (Poems, unpublished)
- Njekkuvilakku (Torchlight) - (Essays, Unpublished)
