= Gibu George =

Indian actor

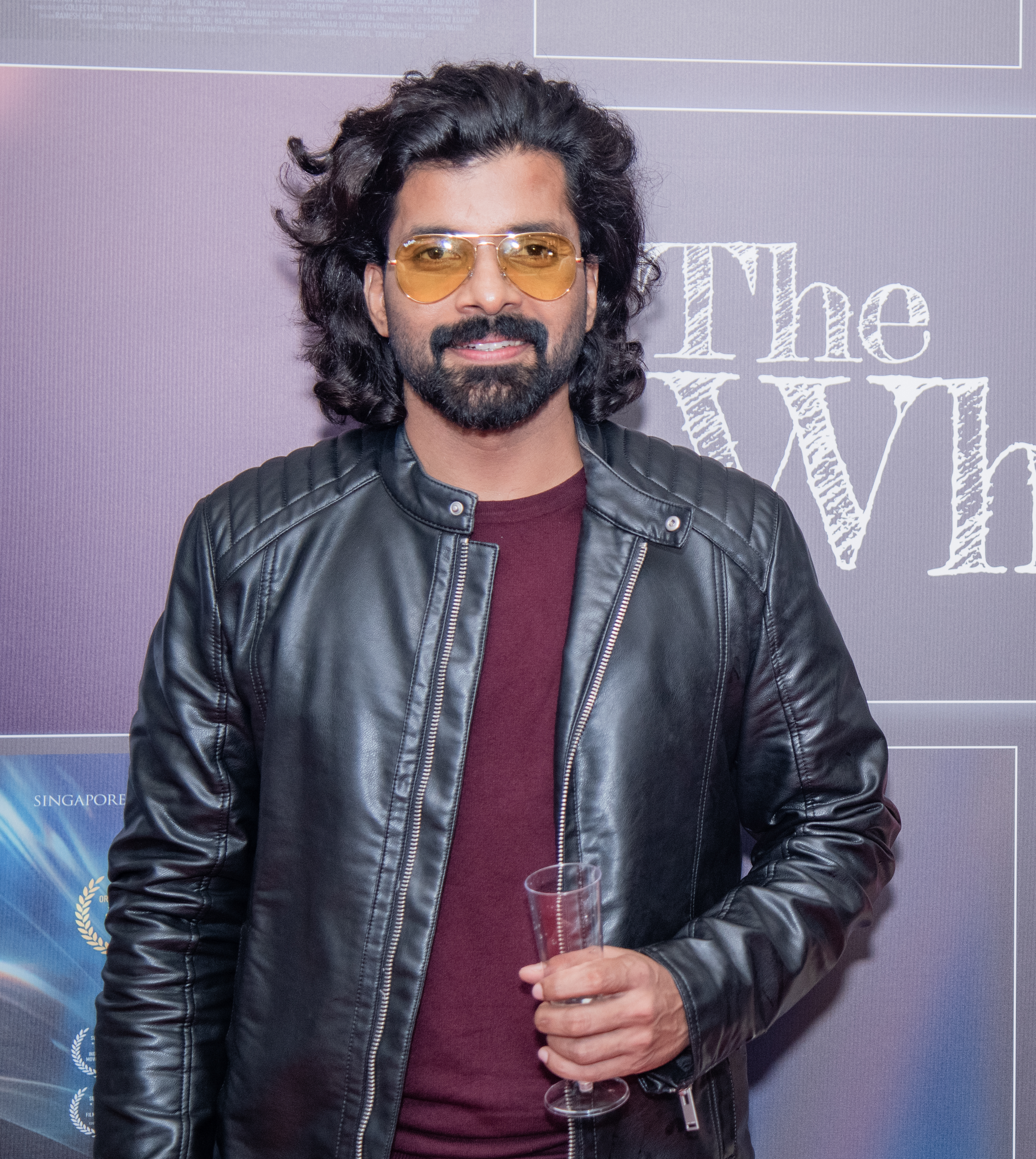
- Gibu in Singapore during the premiere of his film 'The Wheel'
- Born: Mallapally, Thiruvalla, Kerala, India
- Occupations: Film actor; Anchor
- Parent(s): T V George (Father), Annamma George (Mother)

Gibu George is an Indian actor, theatre artist, model and Writer who works in Malayalam film industry. He made his Malayalam feature film debut in the 2021 movie 'Grahanam', becoming the first Singapore Malayalee introduced to the Malayalam film industry in a male lead role. Gibu is known for portraying the lead role of Aadi in Singapore-made English short 'The Wheel', which earned him wide acclaim's, including the Best Actor Award in Barcelona International Film Festival(LHIIF) Spain, making him the first Singapore Malayalee actor to win the title.

Gibu George worked with 'Coldplay', coldplay, the most popular European rock band, in their latest music video 'Man In The Moon' along with Chris Martin made him the first ever Malayalee actor to appear in any Coldplay music videos.

== Early and personal life ==
He did his early schooling in Calcutta where his father was serving in the Army. He later relocated to Thiruvalla for further schooling at St. Mary's school, Thiruvalla and Mahatma Gandhi Higher Secondary school, Puthuserry. Gibu completed his education from Mar Thoma College, Thiruvalla and Institute of Human Resources Development, Kottayam.

== Career ==
Gibu began his career as an anchor of Singapore Choice on Asianet 2017 and gained widespread popularity by establishing himself through several Televisions and stage shows, TV shows, and national commercials in Singapore art scenes. He made his theatre acting debut in 2017 with Manasakshi directed by K Sudheeran as an anti-hero and went on acting in critically acclaimed theatre plays like Bombay Tailor's, Natya Yatra etc. Gibu made his screen acting debut on 2018 as the lead actor for a silent short film 'Alive', directed by award winning filmmaker Tagore Almeida, whose 2013 film "A God of Sinners" got screened at Cannes. Gibu also worked for Singapore Govt. English Film 'Singapore Flying' by award winning Singaporean Film director, K.Rajagopal. He worked with Singapore's most celebrated comedian actor, director Mark Lee for his comedy talk show series SG-Kakis representing India. Gibu worked as Singapore segment production manager for A R Rahman's album "Hope" which was the promotional song for Blessy's Aadujeevitham (The Goat Life). In a span of 3–4 years, Gibu did theatre productions and films projects in 4 different languages – Malayalam, English, Hindi, and Tamil proved his versatility as an actor, anchor, theatre artist, and stage performer and been recognised by Singapore Kerala Arts Association with the award 'KALA Star of the year 2019'. He was working as an IT professional in Singapore for many years before he started pursuing his dreams in acting.

== Filmography ==
=== Short films ===
Year	Title	Role	Director	Language	Notes
2018	Alive	George	Tagore Almeida	Silent	Debut short
2018	Napoleon	Dev	Anand Paga	Hindi	
2019	Singapore Flying	Akshay	K Rajagopal	English	
2020	Oru Puthu Niram	Kathir	Raj Vimal Dev	Tamil, Malayalam	Co-Writer
2020	Memories Never Die	Aaditya Das	Gibu George	Malayalam	Writer, Director
2021	Druvangal Randu	The Antagonist	Sebastian Louis	Malayalam	
2023	The Wheel	Aadi	Rajith Mohan	English	

=== Feature films ===
Year	Title	Role	Director	Language
2021	Grahanam	Roy Kurishingal	Anand Paga	Malayalam
2024	Onkara	Chungru	Unni K R	Mavilan
TBC	Ivide Oral (Shoot in Progress)	Akbar	Shibu Attingal	Malayalam
TBC	Mugha Mugham (Post Production)	Micheal	Akhil Prabhakar	Malayalam

=== Television ===
Year	Program	Role	Channel	Notes
2017	Singapore Choice	Anchor	Asianet	2017–2020
2023	Udan Panam	NRI special episode contestant	Mazhavil Manorama	Family Gameshow
