= Kizhakken Muthoor =

- Ward
- Country: India
- State: Kerala
- District: Pathanamthitta

Population (2011)
  - Total: 1,304

Languages
  - Official: Malayalam, English
- Time zone: UTC+5:30 (IST)
- PIN: 689103
- Telephone code: 0469
- Vehicle registration: KL-27
- Lok Sabha constituency: Pathanamthitta

Kizhakken Muthoor is a ward of Thiruvalla, Kerala, located approximately 1.3 kilometres north of the town centre It falls within the boundaries of the Kuttappuzha pincode (689103).

== Government ==
Kizhakken Muthoor falls under the jurisdiction of Thiruvalla municipality. It is registered as Ward number 4, with a general reservation. The ward councilor is Thomas Vanchipalam, elected from the KC(M) party.

== Geography ==
Kizhakken Muthoor has an average elevation of 39m above sea level. Low-lying paddy fields lie on its eastern side, along the border with Kottayam District.

== Demographics ==
The ward has a population of 1304 persons as of the 2011 census. Most of the population are Malayali, and speak Malayalam and English. The area is also home to a sizeable community of migrant labourers, most of whom are Bengalis, Oriyas, or Oxomiya (Assamese).

== Culture ==
Religious Places:

- St. Paul's Marthoma church
- Sharon Fellowship Church KUTTAPUZHA
- Padapad Temple
- Pallikulagara Temple
- Muthoor Bhadrakali Temple
- Brethren Church
- Believers Church
- IPC Bethel Worship Centre
- Chumathra Brethren Assembly

== Education ==
Schools & Colleges:

- Government Lower Primary School, Muthoor
- NSS High School, Muthoor
- Thiruvalla Mar Thoma College
- Joys Tutorials College
- MTLP School
- Mar Thoma Residential School
- SDA Higher Secondary School
- Believers Church School
- Jacobite Syrian Christian School
- Balavihar
- Christ Central School
