= K. N. Ninan (scientist) =

Space scientist from India (b. 1946)

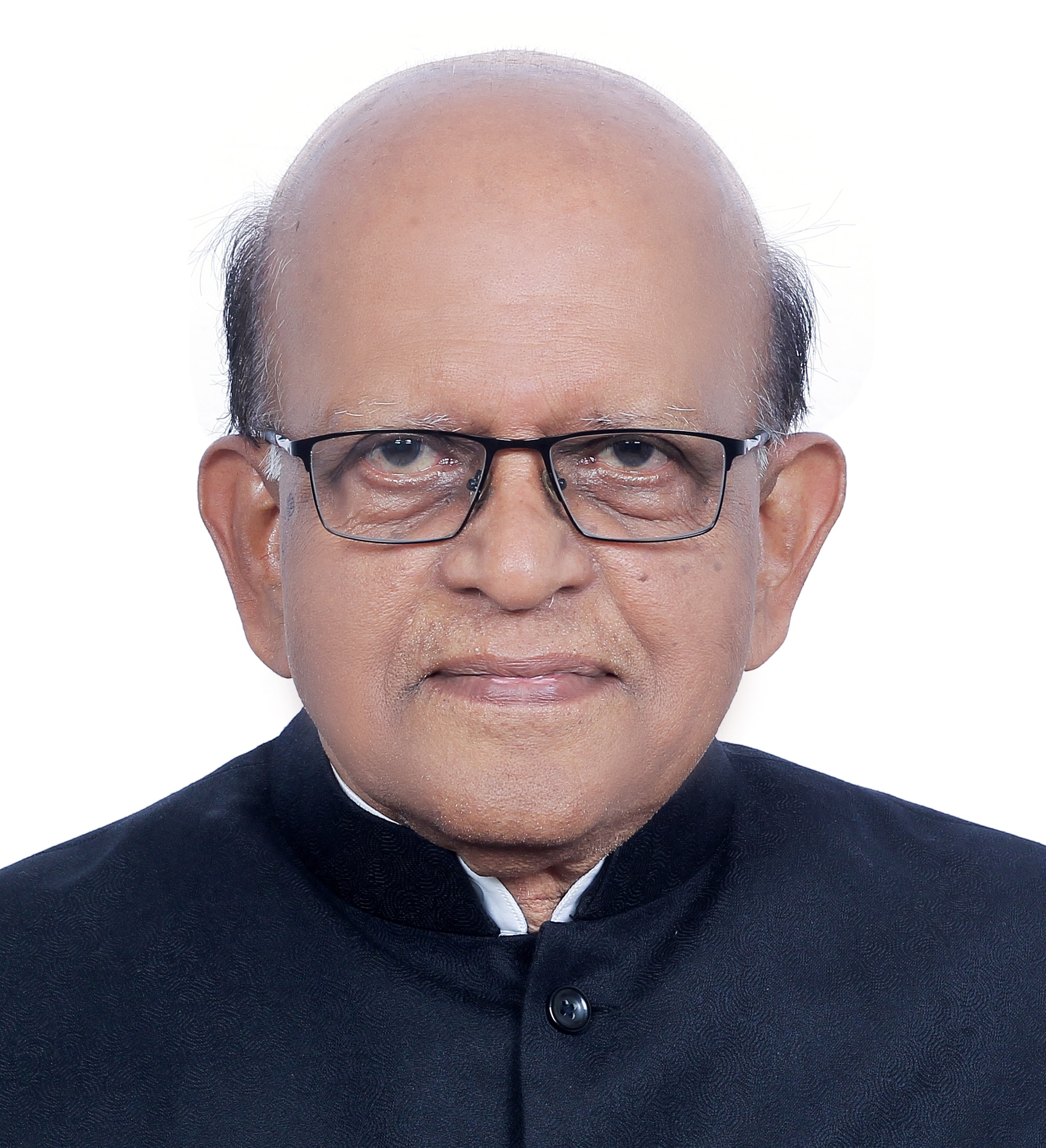
- Born: 6 September 1946 (age 80); Thiruvalla, Kerala, India
- Education: University of Kerala
- Occupation: Space scientist
- Years active: 1968–present
- Organization: Indian Space Research Organization
- Known for: Rocket Propellant, Polymeric materials, Analytical Science, Thermal analysis
- Spouse: Elizabeth (m.1973)
- Children: Anu Ninan (Daughter) & Binu Ninan Kovoor (Son)

Kovoor Ninan Ninan (born 6 September 1946) is a space scientist from India, who has contributed to the development of rocket propellants, polymers and chemical systems for India's space program. He was the Deputy Director of Vikram Sarabhai Space Centre (VSSC) at ISRO, and later an emeritus professor at the Indian Institute of Space Science and Technology (IIST).

== Personal life ==
Born on 6 September 1946 to K.I. Ninan and Annamma of the Kovoor family, at Thiruvalla in the erstwhile Travancore, K. N. Ninan did his schooling from SCS High School Thiruvalla. He obtained his bachelor's degree and Masters in Chemistry from Mar Thoma College, Tiruvalla in 1966 and Maharaja's College Ernakulam in 1968 respectively, both then affiliated to the University of Kerala. He secured first rank from the university for both his degrees.

While working at VSSC, he earned his doctorate degree in the field of solid state thermal decomposition kinetics from the same university in 1981, under the joint supervision of Dr. Vasant R Gowariker, and Prof. C.G. Ramachandran Nair, then head of the department of Chemistry at University of Kerala.

== Career ==
Ninan joined the Indian Space Research Organization (ISRO) in 1968 at its Space Science & Technology Centre (presently VSSC) at Thiruvananthapuram as a trainee under Dr. Vasant Gowariker, Head, Propellant Engineering Division, working to develop indigenous composite solid propellants using the meager facilities available in those days. He superannuated in 2008 as an ‘Outstanding Scientist’ and Deputy Director, VSSC after serving the Space Centre in different capacities as: Propellant Engineer, founding Head, Analytical & Spectroscopy Division and Group Director, Propellant & Special Chemicals Group. After his superannuation, he served as an emeritus professor at IIST for 5 years.

During his career at ISRO, he has contributed in the areas of analytical sciences and chemical systems for space applications. He has established a modern chemical facility at VSSC and led an R&D team of scientists and engineers engaged in the development of propellants, polymers and chemicals required for the launch vehicles and satellites of the country. The studies of his team of analytical scientists on functionality distribution of hydroxyl terminated polybutadiene fuel binder for composite solid propellants and the development of analysis method for the liquid propellant UDMH (1,1-dimethylhydrazine) have been cited in a Wikipedia profile. The studies on binder functionality also contributed to the development of solid propellant grains with adequate structural margins for ISRO’s large solid motors. An outcome of the research on thermal analysis was new equations for kinetic analysis of non-isothermal reactions, cited as "Madhusudhanan-Krishnan-Ninan (MKN) Method". Towards the development of green propellants for ISRO's future rocket and spacecraft propulsion systems, his team developed and patented the processes for making the high energy fuel binder, glycidylazide polymer (GAP) (Indian Patent 207299) and the chlorine free oxidiser, ammonium dinitramide (ADN), the latter in collaboration with Council of Scientific and Industrial Research (US patent 6787119). The research of his team on polymers included those for launch vehicle cryogenic upper stages and aerospace thermal protection systems, as well as matrix resins for polymer matrix composites such as cyanate esters and polyether nitrile copolymers.

At IIST, he mentored a team of students who made India's first student-designed sounding rocket, named "Vyom" and guided a research project on sorbents with superior CO_{2} capture performance.

He has over two hundred and forty publications and 28 patents in his credit

== Awards and honors ==
1. Performance Excellence Award, ISRO (2009) <K. N. Ninan (scientist)#cite note-10>
2. Life Time Achievement Award, Indian Society of Analytical Scientists (2019)
3. HEMSI-M R Kurup Endowment Award, High Energy Materials Society of India (2015)
4. Melpadom Attumalil Georgekutty Merit Award, Mar Thoma Church (2012)
5. Netzsch-ITAS Award of Indian Thermal Analysis Society (1987)
6. Honorary Fellow, High Energy Materials Society of India
7. Fellow, Kerala Academy of Sciences
8. Member, International Academy of Astronautics
9. In the Elsevier-Stanford University list of top 2% Scientists
10. Honorary Fellow, Indian Society of Analytical Scientists ^{[18]}

== Selected patents ==
- Indian Space Research Organization (A.U. Francis, S. Venkatachalam and K.N.Ninan), (4 January 2007) "A process for synthesising a hydroxy terminated glycidylazide polymers"’ Indian Patent 207299.
- BM Choudary, K M Lakshmi, R K Jeeva, K Vijayakumar, C Sridhar (CSIR), S.Venkatachalam, G. Santhosh, R. Ramaswamy. K.N. Ninan; KS. Sastri (VSSC) (15 December 2004) "A process for the Preparation of Dinitramidic acid and salts thereof" European Patent EP1344748A1.

== Selected articles ==
- Madhusudanan, P. M.; Krishnan, K.; Ninan, K. N. (1993-06-28). "New equations for kinetic analysis of non-isothermal reactions" Thermochimica Acta. 221 (1):13–21.DOI:10.1016/0040-6031(93)80519-G
- Venkatachalam, S; Santhosh, G; Ninan, K. N. (2004) "An Overview on the Synthetic Routes and Properties of Ammonium Dinitramide (ADN) and other Dinitramide Salts", Propellants, Explosives, Pyrotechnics29 (3) 178 – 187. https://doi.org/10.1002/prep.200400043
- Nair, C.P.R., Mathew, D., Ninan, K.N. (2001). "Cyanate Ester Resins, Recent Developments". In: New Polymerization Techniques and Synthetic Methodologies. Advances in Polymer Science, vol 155. Springer, Berlin, Heidelberg. doi.org/10.1007/3-540-44473-4_1.
- Saxena, A.; Rao, V. L.; Ninan, K. N. (2003). "Synthesis and properties of polyether nitrile copolymers with pendant methyl groups" European Polymer Journal. 39 (1): 57–61. doi:10.1016/S0014-3057(02)00185-4.
- Sivadas, Deepthi L.; Vijayan, Sujith; Rajeev, R.; Ninan, K. N.; Prabhakaran, K.(2016). "Nitrogen-enriched microporous carbon derived from sucrose and urea with superior CO2 capture performance". Carbon. 109: 7–18. doi:10.1016/j.carbon.2016.07.057
