= Stanley George =

Social worker and Political consultant

- Born: January 30, 1963 (age 63); Kumbanad, Kerala, India
- Education: Mar Thoma College, Tiruvalla, Mahatma Gandhi University, Kerala
- Occupation: Political strategist
- Known for: Advisory role in Donald Trump campaigns

Stanley George (born സ്റ്റാൻലി ജോർജ്, January 30, 1963) is an Indian-American political strategist and commentator, known for his advisory role in the U.S. Republican Party and association with President Donald Trump's political campaigns. Originally from Kerala, India, George has gained prominence for his involvement in shaping immigration-related policies and building outreach among Indian-American voters.

== Early Life and Background ==
Stanley George is of Malayali Christian origin from Kumbanad, Thiruvalla. He later moved to the United States, where he became active in political and community circles. George has become a well-known figure in the Indian diaspora in the U.S. due to his political engagement and public speaking roles.

== Career ==
Stanley George serves in an advisory capacity within the Republican Party (United States). He has been associated with Donald Trump’s campaign team and was selected to the Republican advisory board. His work has focused particularly on outreach to Indian-American communities and shaping immigration policy positions that impact students and professionals of Indian origin.

He has publicly supported policies favoring Indian immigrants, such as promising Green Cards to foreign graduates from U.S. universities if Trump is re-elected. George has been identified by multiple sources as the strategist behind this policy pitch.

George was appointed as the Director of Advocacy at the Federation of Indian American Christian Organizations of North America (FIACONA), where he leads advocacy initiatives on behalf of Indian-American Christians across the United States and Canada. In this role, he co-ordinated advocacy campaigns and engaging with U.S. policymakers in highlighting issues related to religious freedom and minority rights in India.

His political and advisory roles have been covered in various Indian and diaspora media outlets across multiple languages, including Malayalam, Tamil, Bengali, and Gujarati.

George is a sought-after public speaker in diaspora religious and cultural gatherings. He was the keynote speaker at the three-day annual convention of Kenyan Pentecostal Churches in Kenya in 2023.

=== Awards and recognition ===
In 2025, Stanley George was honored with the Global Indian Award, recognizing his significant impact on U.S.-India relations and his role as a bridge between the Indian diaspora and American politics. In 2026, he received the Mother Teresa Award at New Delhi.

== See also ==
- Donald Trump
- Republican Party (United States)
