= Gospel for Asia =

Christian missionary and humanitarian organization

GFA World
- Founded: 1979
- Founder: K. P. Yohannan
- Type: Faith-based
- Purpose: Evangelism, Education, Healthcare, Disaster Relief
- Location: Wills Point, Texas, USA
- Region served: Asia, Africa
- President: Daniel Timotheos
- Website: gfa.org
- Formerly called: Gospel for Asia

GFA World, formerly known as Gospel for Asia, is an independent Christian missionary and humanitarian organization, founded by K. P. Yohannan in 1979, focusing on residents of Asian countries and small parts of Africa. The organization is located about five miles southwest of Wills Point, Texas, a small community east of Dallas, Texas. It is affiliated with the Believers Eastern Church.

GFA World is present in India, Bhutan, Sri Lanka, Nepal, Myanmar, Bangladesh, Cambodia, China, Laos Thailand, Rwanda and Liberia.

== History ==
In 1981, then president K.P Yohannan formed a branch of GFA World (known for over 40 years as Gospel for Asia) in his native Kerala, with an Indian headquarters being set up in Tiruvalla in 1983.

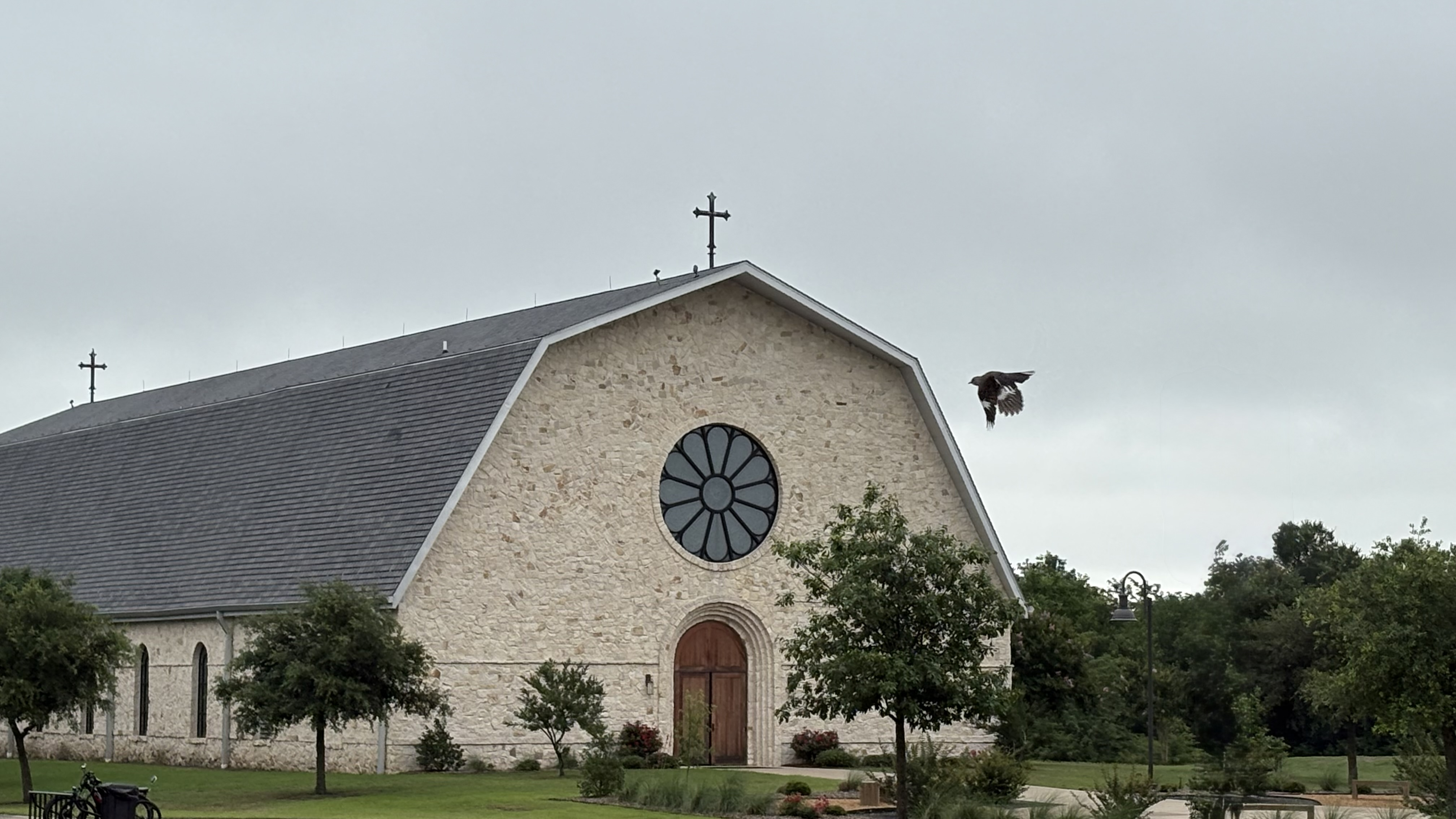
Believers Eastern Church in Antioch village

The organization has grown to support various humanitarian and spiritual programs as well as working with outside organizations, including local governments and the Believer's Eastern Church, which owns and operates hospitals, colleges and public and residential schools. GFA World also offers ministry apprenticeship and volunteer programs as well as an annual retreat for young people called Set Apart held in its Texas Campus.

Following the death of K.P. Yohannan in May 2024, his son Daniel Timotheos became president of GFA World.

== Programs ==
The goal of GFA World focuses on the formation of missionaries native to the region they serve, with special emphasis on Asia and Africa. The organization has defined its primary mission field as being those people that live in the 10/40 Window, a rectangular region extending from West Africa to East Asia.

=== National missionaries ===
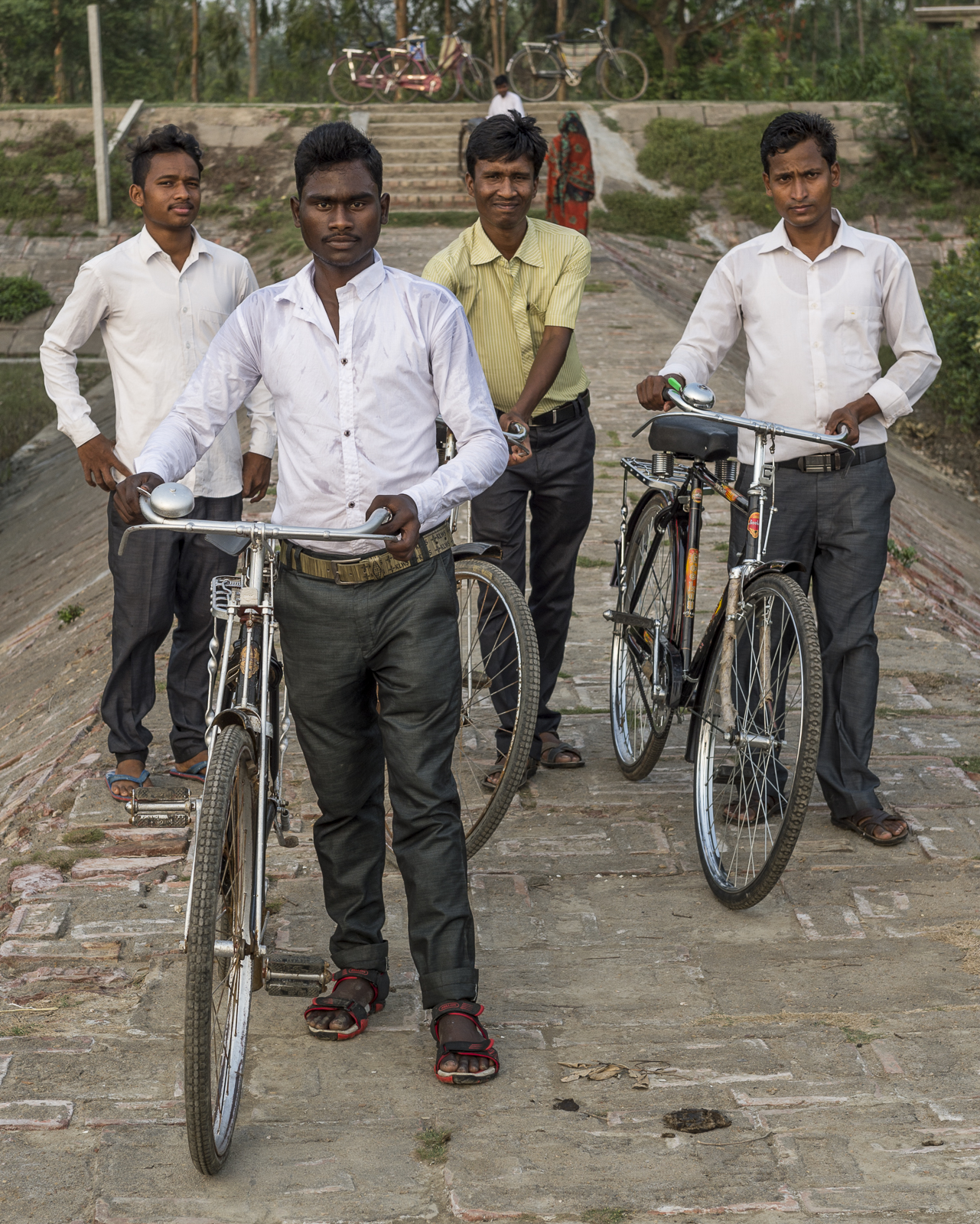
National missionaries in Asia

GFA World's main focus is to train and equip national missionaries. Yohannan stated that he did not limit "national missionaries" to formal nation-states, instead focusing on differences in culture and language to define nationalities. This approach might result in several specialized missionary groups within a single nation-state, from large cities and regions down to small tribes and villages. In 2018, GFA World stated that they had over 16,000 missionaries and church planters in 10 Asian nations.

=== Church buildings, Bibles and gospel literature ===
GFA World raises funds for the building of simple Christian worship centers in small villages to educate new disciples as well as provide a visible meeting place for Christians. However, they have built several large cathedral type buildings in major cities. Examples are St. Thomas Believers Church Cathedral in Thiruvalla and another in an upscale neighborhood Hauz Khas. GFA World states they distribute native-language bibles and evangelical Christian literature to the region.

=== Radio and television broadcasts ===
GFA World produces the Radio in Asia broadcast and the Athmeeya Yathra (Spiritual Journey) radio programs and the Athmeeyayathra Television's YouTube channel, which provides biblical video content. It also airs GFA Minute, in 18 radio stations across the US.

=== Bible colleges ===
GFA World has 56 bible colleges in India, Nepal, Bangladesh, Myanmar and Sri Lanka with the purpose of training native missionaries with usage of their own dialects and cultures so that leaders could promote gospels. The program includes three years of instruction, including field instruction and experience.

=== GFA World Child Sponsorships ===
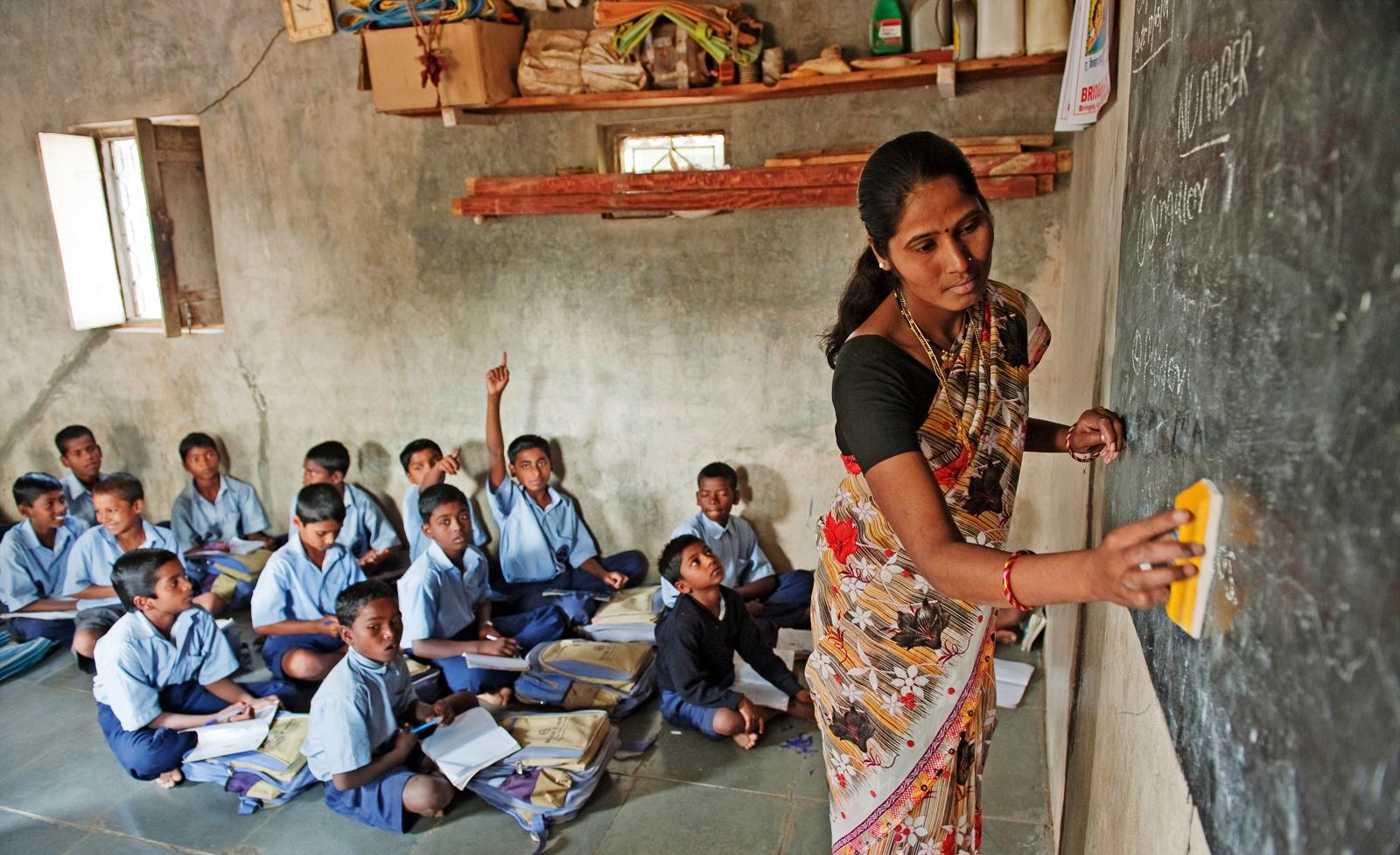
A class taken in a GFA World Child Sponsorship school

GFA World maintains a child sponsorship program for poor families in underserved communities, especially lower-caste families. The program offers education, physical and spiritual care, including healthcare training and vocational training for women. In its 2019 Special Report, GFA World had reported that there were 138,000 children enrolled throughout Asia in its child sponsorship program.

=== Wells ===
GFA World digs clean water bore wells in communities where water is scarce during parts or most of the year. These wells are built for long-term use near churches, bible colleges or Child Sponsorship centers, and each well is maintained by a local pastor. These wells provide free, clean water to individuals regardless of caste, class, social designation or religion. In its 2019 Special Report, GFA World reported 4,856 wells were drilled in communities needing clean water and 12,243 BioSand water filters have been provided to individuals or families who only have access to compromised water sources.

=== Leprosy ministry ===
The "Reaching Friends Ministry" started as a small effort in 2007 to help a few people suffering with leprosy. GFA World workers care for the patients through social and relief work, medical aid, and health and hygiene awareness programs.

=== Expansion to Africa ===
GFA World's work in Africa begins with Child Sponsorship in the slums of Kigali, the capital of Rwanda. This expansion also includes clean water projects, medical ministry, education for the underprivileged, community development projects, women empowerment and training indigenous workers to serve their native communities. GFA World plans to expand the ministry to six other nations in Africa during the next few years. In 2025, GFA World extends missionary movement to Liberia, West Africa.

== Disaster relief ==
=== Nepal earthquake ===
GFA World-supported field partners joined forces with the Nepal government to provide disaster relief in the wake of Nepal’s 2015 Earthquake. The organization helped by providing food, water and medical supplies. Following the initial relief efforts, GFA World's founder K.P. Yohannan met with the Prime Minister of Nepal.

=== Asian water crisis ===
One of their longest ongoing efforts to date, GFA World's Jesus Wells provide clean drinking water to Asian villages with insufficient access to safe, clean water sources. By 2018, the organization helped construct almost 7,000 wells and BioSand water filters. The wells are typically maintained by GFA World-supported pastors or their church members, preventing the wells from breaking down and ensuring they last for up to 2 decades.

=== Illiteracy and poverty ===
GFA World's Child Sponsorship after-school program assists underprivileged villages through ongoing literacy and education for their boys and girls. This education helps children and their families to overcome generational poverty and avoid the worlds of bonded labor and sex-slave trade. There are more than 600 of these centers. Students at the centers receive daily education and a nutritious meal, school supplies and uniforms as well as free medical care. GFA World is using these centers as a way to alleviate the root causes of impoverishment and gender discrimination in Asian countries as well as inhumane child labor practices.

=== Kerala floods ===
In 2018, flooding in Kerala left over 200,000 Indian people without homes. GFA World's primary field partner saw their Kerala headquarters suffer from severe flooding. Many Child Sponsorship centers also suffered damage. GFA World's field partner volunteers delivered medical supplies, clothes, food and fresh water to flooding victims in the area.

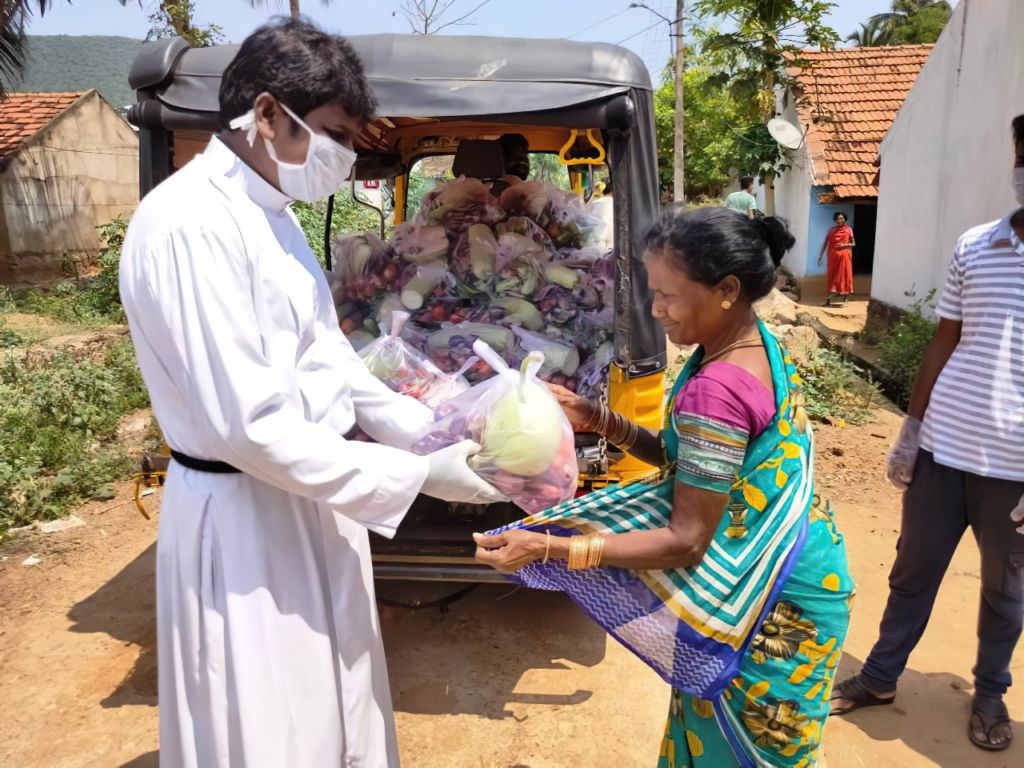
GFA World distributes vegetables in Andhra Pradesh during Covid lockdown

=== COVID-19 relief ===
Due to the water crisis and national lockdown in India, leaving home and effective hand washing are not possibilities. In response to the coronavirus, GFA World provided clean water projects through Biosand filter and Jesus Wells in order to give clean drinking and hand washing water. They also partnered with local governments to educate people and improve on hand washing techniques. The organization also installed toilets and running medical clinics throughout South Asia. GFA World partnered with Believers Eastern Church in Asia and local officials to distribute food kits for families suffering from the medical and economic loses due to COVID-19.

== Affiliate offices ==
GFA World has eight affiliated international entities in which they operate, including Canada, United Kingdom, New Zealand, Australia, South Africa, Germany, Finland, and South Korea.

== Controversies ==
=== GFA Diaspora ===
In 2014, a group of over 10 former Gospel for Asia staff members named the GFA Diaspora wrote a letter regarding GFA leadership and another one for GFA's donors.

These letters brought about a supposed internal investigation by GFA that was completed by Gayle Erwin, a member of GFA's board. Upon the completion of Erwin's investigation, a report was released along with letters of explanation to the GFA Diaspora Group.

=== ECFA Membership ===
In September 2015, GFA lost their 36-year membership in the financial standards advocacy group Evangelical Council for Financial Accountability (ECFA), with the ECFA reporting that GFA had not met many of their required standards of excellence in financial accountability and governance.

The GFA board responded with a statement that noted "ECFA's decision was made after conducting a special review of Gospel for Asia, and we respect ECFA's evaluation. Our response was to begin a focused review and to implement the ECFA's recommended improvements".

=== Class action lawsuit ===
GFA has faced two class-action suits – one in the US and one in Canada – over their disbursement of the collected funds; the GFA settled the US case at a cost of $37 million, without any admission of guilt. The motion to certify a class-action lawsuit vs GFA in Canada was dismissed by the Ontario Superior Court of Justice in Toronto in March, 2022.

In 2017 Gospel for Asia was accused by Arkansas couple Garland and Phyllis Murphy of raising funds for charity "while covertly diverting the money to a multimillion-dollar personal empire". The couple filed a class action RICO anti-fraud lawsuit against GFA's president and several GFA leaders, seeking to substantiate GFA's claims of where it spent the money donors gave to the organization. The case was settled after three years of court proceedings in which GFA and the plaintiff agreed "all donations designated for use in the field were ultimately sent to the field". Those entitled to join the class action were those United States residents who donated to Gospel for Asia between 1 January 2009 and 10 September 2018. Information regarding the lawsuit has been published on the official Murphy v Gospel for Asia website.

The settlement agreement also requires that K. P. Yohannan's wife Gisela be removed from the board of the charity for three years and for Garland Murphy, one of the plaintiffs, to be given a seat and another person appointed to the board acceptable to both Murphy and K. P. Yohannan; in addition a subcommittee of the board which will include Murphy but neither Yohannan nor his son, Daniel Punnose, will produce annual reports for the board, the Judge and the lead counsel for three years.

=== GFA UK ===
In January 2016 the Charity Commission, the non-ministerial government department that regulates registered charities in England and Wales and maintains the Central Register of Charities, was "assessing information provided" about the United Kingdom GFA office. The United Kingdom GFA office remains recognised by them as a registered charity with up-to-date accounts. In the year ending 31 March 2020, they spent £316,000 on fundraising, brought in donations and legacies totaling £1.37 million, and spent £0 on charitable activities.

=== GFA New Zealand ===
Gospel for Asia New Zealand used to occupy an office space at the Calvary Chapel Auckland. After the controversies, Calvary Chapel severed ties with GFA. GFA now operates its ministries in Rosedale, Auckland, New Zealand.

=== GFA World (formerly GFA Canada) ===
A Canadian class-action lawsuit, which accused the ministry of defrauding or making negligent misstatements to donors, was denied certification in May, 2022. The Ontario Superior Court of Justice found that those who accused GFA World Canada failed to provide "admissible evidence beyond speculation, conjecture, and allegations of wrongdoing".

=== Believer's Eastern Church ===
Criticism regarding the Believer's Eastern Church are mentioned in the main article of Believer's Eastern Church.

== Bibliography ==
- Brodeur, Michael; Liebscher, Banning. (2013). Revival Culture: Prepare for the Next Great Awakening. Chapter 4. Gospel Light Publications. ISBN 9780830765478
- Yohannan, K.P. (2004). Revolution in World Missions. Gospel for Asia Books. Carrollton, Texas. ISBN 9781595890016
