= Kattode =

- Ward
- Interactive map of Kattode
- Country: India
- State: Kerala
- District: Pathanamthitta

Population (2011)
  - Total: 783

Languages
  - Official: Malayalam, English
- Time zone: UTC+5:30 (IST)
- PIN: 689105
- Telephone code: 0469
- Vehicle registration: KL-27
- Lok Sabha constituency: Pathanamthitta

Kattode is a ward of Thiruvalla, Kerala. It falls within the boundaries of the Manjadi P.O. pincode (689105).

== Geography ==
Kattode is situated on the Sabarimala pilgrimage route on the Thiruvalla - Kumbazha road (TK road / Sh-07).

== Demographics ==
The major religions of the population are Hinduism and Christianity.

== Schools ==
=== Educational institutions in & around ===
- Nicholson Syrian Girls High School, Meenthalakara
- Mar Thoma Sevika Sangham K.G & U. P. School, Meenthalakara

== Places of worship ==
- Meenthalakara Ayyappa temple
- St Marys Knanaya Church
- St. Mary's Catholic Church, Kattode
- Christos Mar Thoma Church

Meenthalakara

- Assemblies of God Church
- India Pentecostal Church of God
- St. Stephen Orthodox Church, Meenthalakara

Ayyappa temple is situated about two-kilometer from the Thiruvalla railway station. Pathanamthitta District, Kerala, India is one among the most prominent ayyappa temples in kerala.

== Festivals ==
The main festival is celebrated annually during March/April. 11 days of festival starts with many cultural & traditional programs in subsequent days. The main attraction of this festival is Kaavadiyattam, pallivilakku, pallivetta and aarattu.

The second main festival is Sree Bhagavatha Sapthaha Yagnam, during January or February. This includes detail description of Bhagavatham followed by religious speeches, cultural & traditional programs. 7 days of festival ends with Aarattutsavam.

Mandala pooja conducted for 41 days in the temple.
