= Mariamma Chedathy =

Indian activist

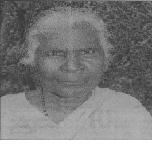
Mariamma Chedathy

Mariamma Chedathy, also known as Mariamma John, was a folklorist from the state of Kerala in India. She was born in Thiruvalla. Mariamma Chedathy died on 31 August 2008.

== Sources ==
- B. C. Folklore, Bulletin of the British Columbia Folklore Society, has published three articles based on the book Manikkam Pennu
  - The Death and Resurrection of Kamachavelan, B. C. Folklore, No. 11
  - Manikkam Pennu: a Paraya Folktale, No. 12
  - Humans, Gods, and Nature in Paraya Folklore, No. 14
