= Kuttappuzha =

Village in Pathanamthitta District, Kerala, India

Kuttapuzha
- Locality
- Country: India
- State: Kerala
- District: Pathanamthitta

Area
  - Total: 14.17 km^{2} (5.47 sq mi)

Population (2011)
  - Total: 29,501
  - Density: 2,082/km^{2} (5,392/sq mi)

Languages
  - Official: Malayalam, English
- Time zone: UTC+5:30 (IST)
- PIN: 689103
- Vehicle registration: KL-27

Kuttappuzha is a revenue village and postal code in Thiruvalla, Kerala, located approximately 1.3 kilometres north of the town centre. The revenue village was formed by bifurcating the Thiruvalla revenue village in 1985.

Kuttapuzha is the location of the headquarters of the Believers Eastern Church.

== History ==
Kuttappuzha used to be a village and a gram panchayat. Due to development and urbanisation, the gram panchayat was later merged with the Thiruvalla municipality. However, the revenue village was not merged and continues to exist independent of the Thiruvalla revenue village.

== Politics ==
Kuttappuzha is a part of the Pathanamthitta Lok Sabha constituency. Anto Antony is the current Member of Parliament.

== Geography ==
Kuttappuzha has an average elevation of around 37m above sea level. Low-lying paddies drained by the Manimala River lie on its westernmost and easternmost boundaries. The fields drained by the Manimala in Kizhakken Muthoor flood during the monsoons. In 2003, an artificial lake (Believers Church Lake) with an area of around 31,000 sqm. was constructed in the Believers Church campus in Chumathra.
