= C. K. Ra =

Painter and writer

C. K. Ramakrishnan Nair (1917 – 16 September 1994), popularly known as C.K. Ra, was an Indian painter, writer and teacher of fine arts. An advocate of creative freedom, he was credited with bringing modernism into Kerala painting and heralded the "Ra phase" it. He was the superintendent of the Trivandrum School of Arts and later became the chairman of Kerala Lalita Kala Akademi.

== Biography ==
C. K. Ra was born in Thiruvalla to K. Ramavarma Koithampuran of Paliakara Kottaram and Sankaravelil Kunjukuttiyamma. He had his initial training at Ravi Varma School of Painting in Mavelikara under Rama Varma, the younger son of Raja Ravi Varma. After completion of his studies, he went to Bombay to work with the British Information Department. During his time in Bombay, he created a series of paintings about the torments of the Second World War, including Peace after War, Prelude to Revenge and Massacre. When the war was over, he left Bombay and took to teaching, first at a school in Coimbatore and later at the Ravi Varma School of Painting, Mavelikara. He had a brief period of training in Santiniketan and became a disciple of Jamini Roy and Nandalal Bose. When he returned to Kerala to work at the College of Fine Arts Trivandrum, it was the beginning of the "Ra phase" in Kerala painting. Some of the memorable paintings of this period were Temple Fantasia, Washing Hair and Delightful Pain, works that aspire to transcend the practiced responses to colour, form and meaning. Among his contemporaries who were based in Trivandrum were his disciple Chirayinkil Sreekantan Nair, G. Rajendran, B.D. Dethan and N.Divakaran, all of whom were former students of the Trivandrum School of Arts and the self-taught painter and novelist Malayattoor Ramakrishnan. C.K. Ra also wrote on modernism in painting.
