= K. P. Yohannan =

Indian Pentecostal prelate (1950–2024)

Moran Mor Athanasius Yohan I
- Metropolitan of the Believers Eastern Church
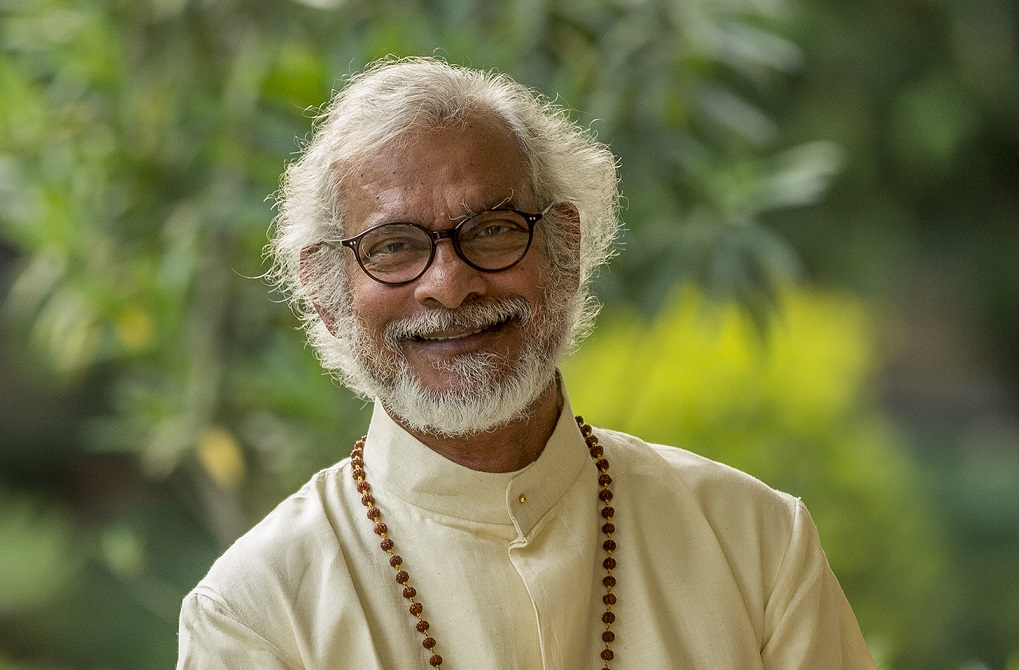
- Native name: Yohannan Kadippiaril Punnose
- Church: Believers Eastern Church
- Predecessor: position established
- Successor: Samuel Theophilus

Orders
- Rank: Metropolitan

Personal details
- Born: 8 March 1950 Kerala, India
- Died: 8 May 2024 (aged 74) Wills Point, Dallas, Texas, U.S.
- Denomination: Believers Eastern Church
- Spouse: Gisela Punnose
- Children: Daniel; Sarah
- Occupation: Metropolitan Bishop of Believers Eastern Church
- Education: Criswell College

Athanasius Yohan I (born K. P. Yohannan; 8 March 1950 – 8 May 2024) was a Mar Thoma turned Baptist turned Pentecostal Christian in India and later embraced a spirituality similar to the Eastern Orthodox tradition. He was the founder and president of GFA World formerly known as Gospel for Asia, a large non-profit missions organisation with a focus on India and Asia. He was also the founding Metropolitan Bishop of Believers Eastern Church (formerly Believers Church) with the religious title and name of Moran Mor Athanasius Yohan I. Yohannan had been airing Athmeeya Yathra radio program since the 1980s, which also was transcribed into over 200 books on Christian living.

== Biography ==
=== Early life and education ===
K. P. Yohannan was born on 8 March 1950, and raised in a St. Thomas Syrian Christian (Mar Thoma Syrian Church) family in Kerala, India. At age eight he became a follower of Jesus. He was 16 when he joined the Operation Mobilisation (OM), an evangelical missions movement, and served them for eight years in the Indian subcontinent. He continued to have close working relationship and friendship with the late George Verwer, OM's founder. Through an invitation from W.A. Criswell, Yohannan moved to the United States in 1974 for theological studies at Criswell College (at the time Criswell Bible Institute) in Dallas, Texas. He graduated with a B.A. in Biblical Studies, becoming the school's first international student to graduate. Eventually he also was conferred an honorary degree of divinity by Hindustan Bible Institute and College in Madras, India. Though his degree was honorary, he often used the title of "doctor" when in the United States.

=== Ministry ===
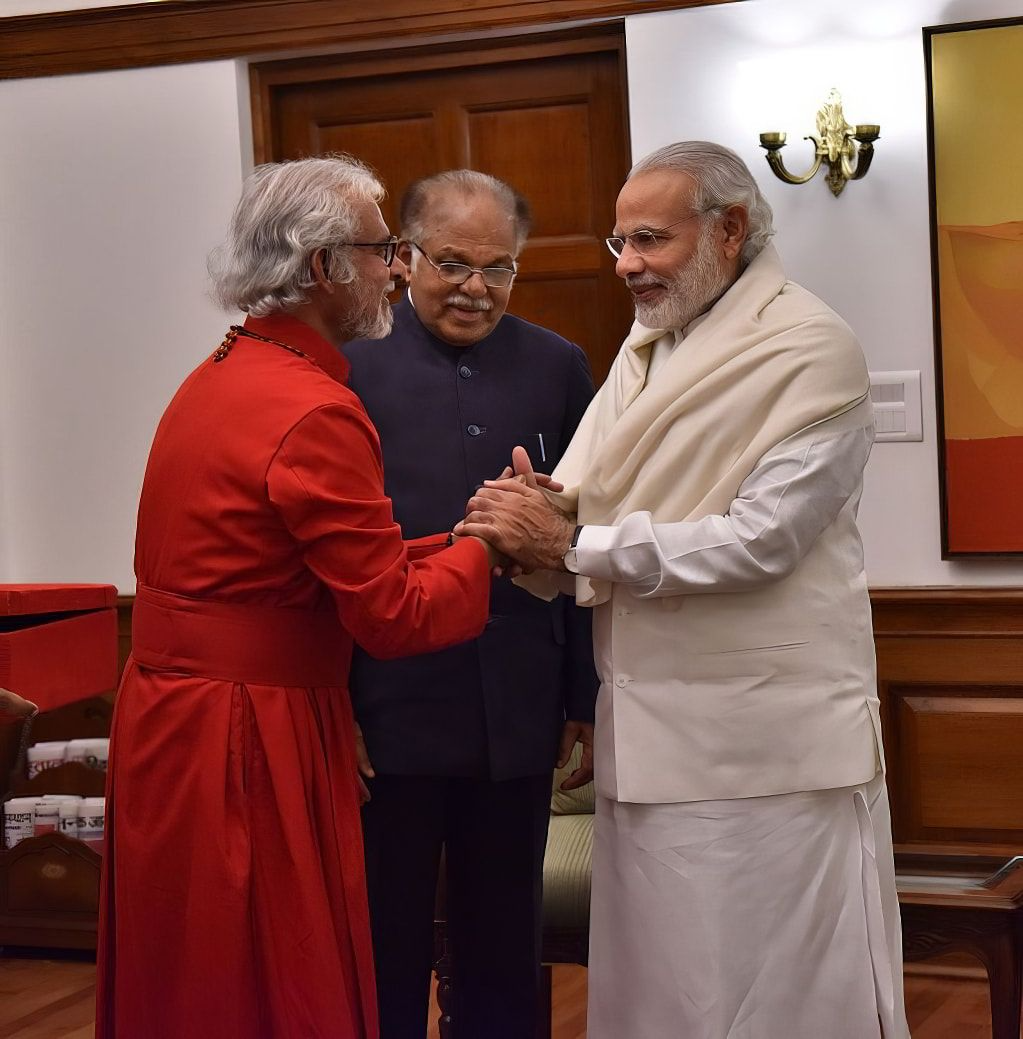
K. P. Yohannan meets with Indian Prime Minister Narendra Modi in March 2016.

Six months into his undergraduate degree, Yohannan became an ordained clergyman and served in the clergy of a Native American Southern Baptist church for four years near Dallas, Texas. In 1979, Yohannan and his wife Gisela started an organisation known today as Gospel for Asia, based in Carrollton, Texas until 2014, when it moved to Wills Point, Texas. In the first year, they helped provide financial support and training to 24 missionaries. In 1979, Yohannan resigned from his church to devote attention to full-time mission work. In 1981, he started a chapter of Gospel for Asia (GFA) in Kerala, India, and in 1983 created an Indian headquarters in Tiruvalla. GFA supports over 50 Bible colleges in various countries.

==== Gospel for Asia ====
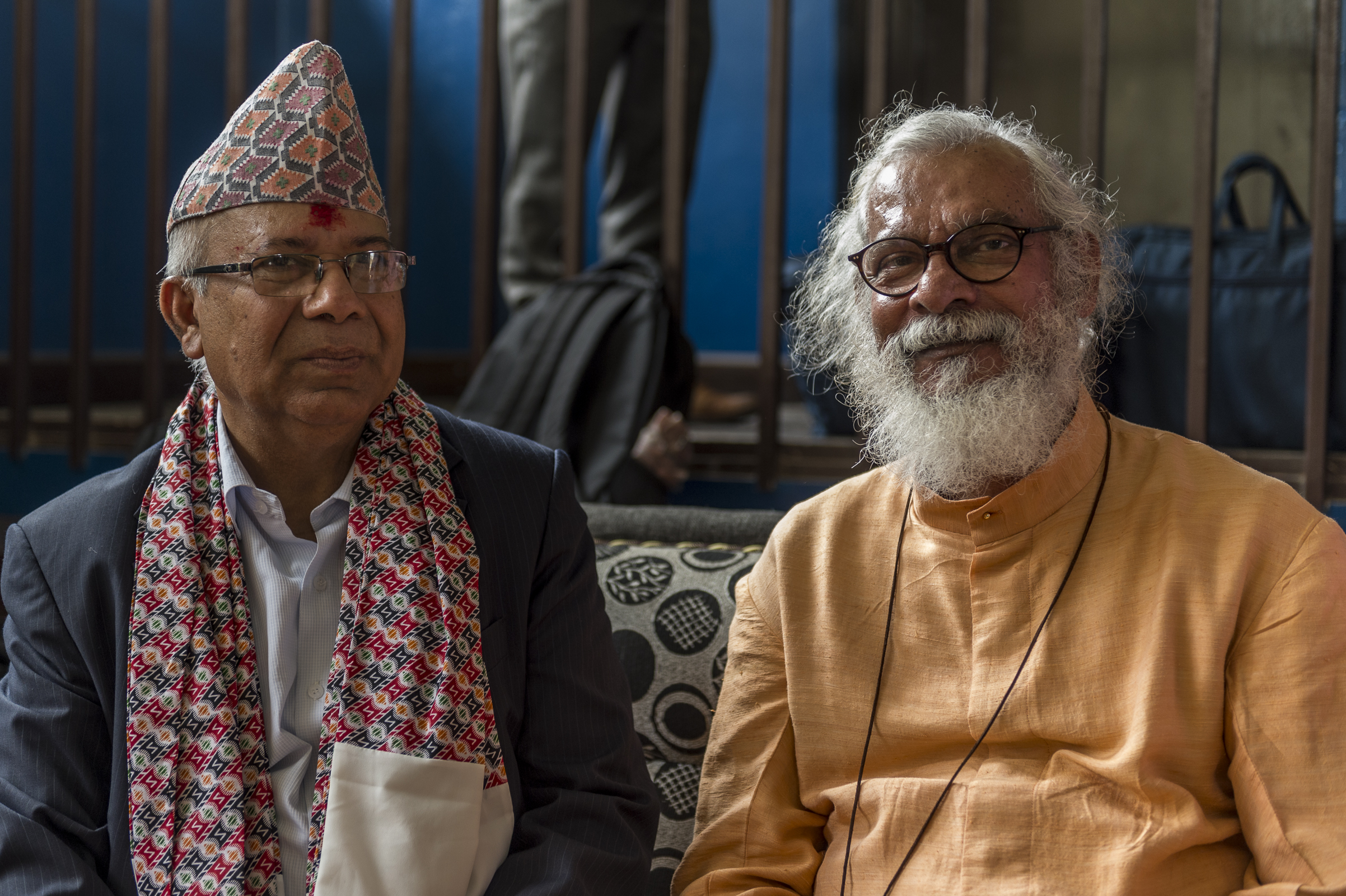
K. P. Yohannan with former Prime Minister of Nepal, Madvah Kumar Nepal

He founded Gospel for Asia in 1979. It adheres to Yohannan's belief in the efficiency and efficacy of "national missionaries", or missionaries that are native to the nation or culture they serve. The organisation's primary mission fields include those that live in the 10/40 window, referring to the longitudinal coordinates of areas in west Africa, India and east Asia. Yohannan credited his early work in his native India as inspiration for his focus on the poor and underserved in this region. He states:

"In my head I knew all the answers, and Bible became the tool of the trade for me that I would use to teach and preach and I was doing very well. People liked my sermons, but finally I said to myself, ‘I'm not the same person I was when the Lord called me to serve Him. I'm not the same person that I was that walked on the streets of North India weeping over the lost and perishing millions and stayed up all night praying and weeping over a world map. The Lord was gracious enough to talk to us very lovingly, and I realized that he wanted me to go back to America and speak to the ‘Body of Christ' about the possibility of seeing countries like India, Burma and Bhutan, turn to Christ if only they would become unselfish in praying and helping these brothers by becoming senders."

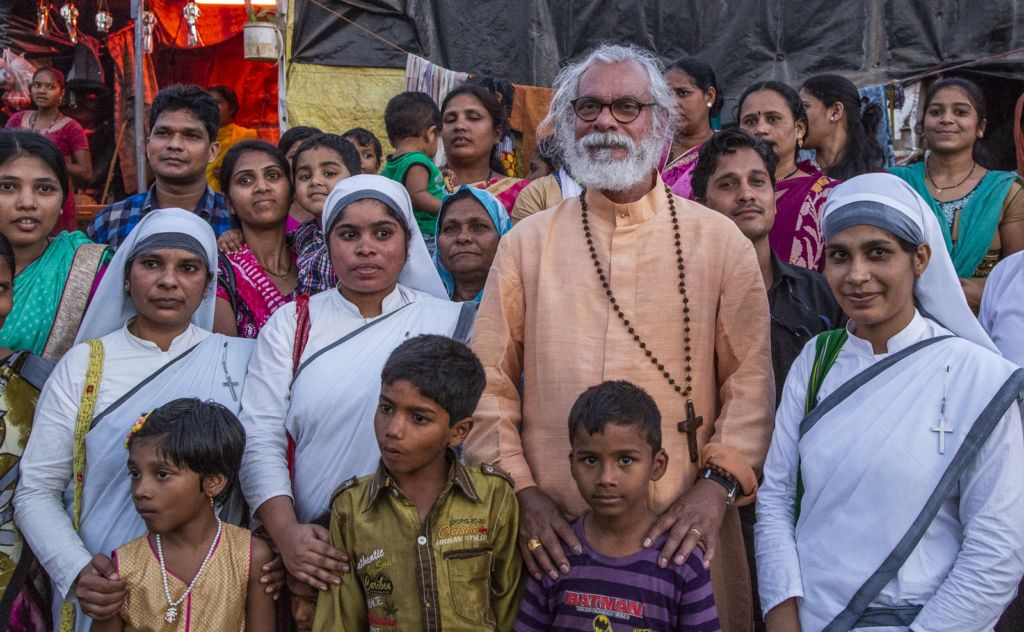
K.P. Yohannan visiting a slum in India

==== Believers Eastern Church ====
In 1993, he founded the Believers Church, later Believers Eastern Church, a self-described "evangelical in nature and outlook, oriental in worship, democratic in function, and orthodox in governance and character" church. Believers Eastern Church is administratively based in the state of Kerala in southwestern India. He was the Metropolitan Bishop at the time of his death.

=== Family ===
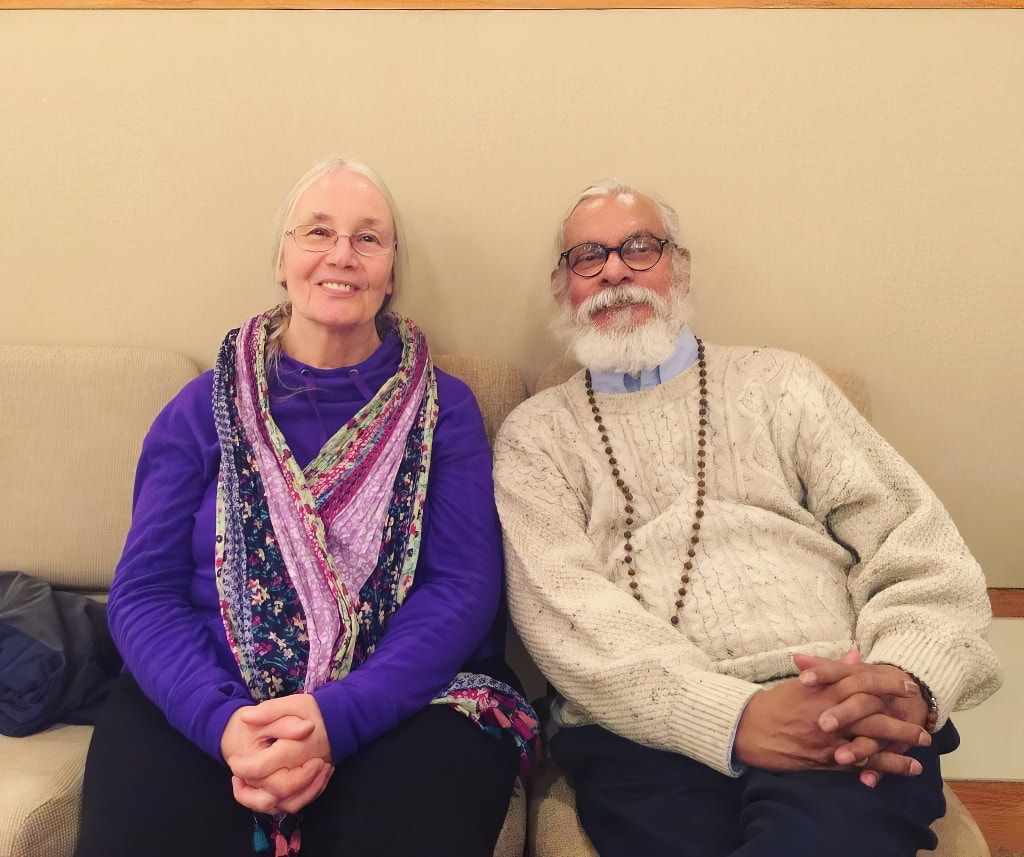
K. P. Yohannan and his wife, Gisela

Yohannan was married to Gisela, who served with him in Operation Mobilisation. They met in 1973. In 1974, they were married in Germany, Gisela's birth country. They have two children, Daniel and Sarah and seven grandchildren.

=== Name change ===
In August 2018, Believers Eastern Church announced that bishops and leaders in the church would take up ecclesiastical names in church duties, and Yohannan henceforth would be known as Moran Mor Athanasius Yohan Metropolitan with respect to church duties. Across the Western world, he continued to go by K. P. Yohannan as an author, speaker and missionary statesman.

=== Death ===
On 7 May 2024, Yohannan was hit by a vehicle while on a morning walk in Wills Point, Texas. He died the following day from cardiac arrest. Yohannan was 74 years of age.

== Print and radio ==
Yohannan was the author of 39 books published in the US and over 200 books published in India. His books include Revolution In World Missions.

Yohannan's radio broadcast Road to Reality was heard on over 900 radio stations in the US, Canada, UK, and Australia. He has also been heard on the Athmeeya Yathra (Spiritual Journey) daily broadcast for the past 25 years. The program is broadcast in 14 nations in 113 Asian languages. Athmeeya Yathra now includes a television station and print media.

Yohannan was a member of the board of the National Religious Broadcasters Association (NRB) from 2013 to 2015. In 2003, NRB presented Yohannan with its Individual Achievement in International Broadcasting award.

=== Books ===
- Shimon Peres: A Novel (2024) ISBN 1629611689
- No Longer a Slumdog (2015) ISBN 978-1595891556
- A Life of Balance (2014) ISBN 978-1595891013
- Living in the Light of Eternity: How to Make the Only Difference That Matters (2014) ISBN 978-1595891402
- Seeing Him, Kindle Edition (2014) ISBN 978-1595890979
- That They All May Be One - Kindle Edition (2014) ISBN 978-1595890917
- Dance Not for Time (2013) ISBN 978-1595891297
- Little Things That Make a Big Difference (2013) ISBN 978-1595891235
- Touching Godliness (2013) ISBN 978-1595891211
- Crisis in Leadership (2012) ISBN 978-1595891167
- The Road to Reality: Coming Home to Jesus from the Unreal World (2012) ISBN 978-1595891136
- No Longer a Slumdog: Bringing Hope to Children in Crisis (2011) ISBN 978-1595890658
- Discouragement: Reasons and Answers (2010) ISBN 978-1595890733
- Destined to Soar (2009) ISBN 978-1595890580
- Touching Godliness: Experience Freedom through Submission (2008) ISBN 978-1595890559
- When We Have Failed-What Next? (2008) ISBN 978-1595890351
- Against The Wind (2006) ISBN 978-1595890474
- Reflecting His Image: The Beauty of Following Christ Intimately (2005) ISBN 978-1595890054
- Come, Let's Reach The World: Partnership in Church Planting Among the Most Unreached (2004) ISBN 978-1595890030
- Dependence upon the Lord (2004) ISBN 978-1595890153
- Journey with Jesus (2004) ISBN 978-1595890184
- Learning to Pray (2004) ISBN 978-1595890290
- Living By Faith Not By Sight (2004) ISBN 978-1595890108
- Living in the Light of Eternity: Discovering God's Design for Your Life (2004) ISBN 978-1595890047
- Principles in Maintaining a Godly Organization (2004) ISBN 978-1595890085
- Revolution in World Missions (2004) ISBN 978-1595890016, 978-1565999916, 978-0884192633, 978-0884191957
- Stay Encouraged (2004) ISBN 978-1595890306
- The Beauty of Christ through Brokenness (2004) ISBN 978-1595890160
- Journey with Jesus Series (2003) ISBN 978-1565999794
- Living in the Light of Eternity: Your Life Can Make a Difference (1999) ISBN 978-1565999893
- On Tour with Brother K. P.: Four Inspiring Messages to Stir Your Heart (1999) ISBN 978-1565999923
- The Coming Revolution in World Missions (1991) ASIN B000K0FRDK
- Why The World Waits (1991) ISBN 978-0884193036
- One Month For Asia (A Devotional Guide) (1985) ASIN B000OKUCUY

=== Athmeeya Yathra ===
Athmeeya Yathra
- Country: India
- Broadcast area: Indian sub-continent, Middle East
- Headquarters: Thiruvalla, Kerala

Programming
- Language: Malayalam
- Picture format: 576p (SD)

Ownership
- Owner: AY Broadcast Foundation

History
- Launched: 2011
- Closed: 17 September 2020; 6 years ago

Athmeeya Yathra (Spiritual Journey) was a Christian satellite channel and radio broadcast. The radio broadcast began in India in 1985. It is based in Thiruvalla, Kerala, India. The program was first aired as a 15-minute daily broadcast by Yohannan. The programmes mainly deals with issues that people face on a day-to-day basis. The simple language attracted many and made it easy for everyone to understand.

As languages began to be added, Athmeeya Yathra Radio expanded in scope and reach. The programme is at present broadcast in 110 languages across Asia. The broadcasting is done through Short wave (SW), Medium Wave (MW) and FM stations. Broadcast languages include Sinhalese, Malayalam, Telugu, Kannada, Tamil, Oriya, Gujarati, Punjabi, Bengali, Assamese, Hindi, Rajasthani, Marwari, Marathi, Bhojpuri, Bundeli, Nepali, Chhattisgarhi, Urdu, and Santali.

Athmeeya Yathra was almost a household name in the Kerala when radio was the main medium. The radio broadcasts are now available online. It is available in Asianet Digital TV, channel number 111.

=== Athmeeya Yathra TV ===
In 2011, Athmeeya Yathra Television was launched. The mission of this TV channel is to bring healing, hope and blessings to this generation through Christ's love. It is done through broadcasting value-based programs with the goal to work a positive difference in people's beliefs, behaviour and their relation to God and their fellow men.

Athmeeya Yathra Television is also streamed live on the internet.

== Controversies ==
=== Income tax raid ===
In November 2020, the India Income Tax Department raided the residence and offices of Yohannan, seizing 5,700,000 Indian rupees (about $78,147 US) from a car boot. The Ministry of Home Affairs had barred the Believers Church and three other associated N.G.O.s from accepting foreign funds. It was claimed in 2008 that the church received over Rs 1,000 crore (10,000,000,000 Indian Rupees, about $137,100,000 US) in foreign funds over an 18-year span.

=== Court rulings in India ===
The operations of Gospel for Asia and Believers Church were scrutinised after Believers Church purchased a 2,268-acre (9.18 km^{2}) rubber estate in Kerala, India. Opponents claimed the church had diverted foreign funds to amass land for itself and for uses other than declared purposes. It was further alleged that the rubber estate, which Believers Church purchased from Harrison's Malayalam, Ltd., was on government leasehold and therefore not saleable. Hence, Believers Church was accused of illegally holding government land. At a later time, Harrison's Malayalam was accused of forging their land title, leading to continued debate about the legality of the sale.

Former Ernakulam District Collector M. G. Rajamanickam, who was appointed as Government Special Officer to confiscate illegal and excess estate lands under the custody of various companies, had issued an order in May 2015, confiscating the 2,268 acre of land from Believers' Church." However, the ruling has been appealed and now is further complicated by the local government's desire to build an airport on this estate, as reported by local news outfits. However, it also was reported that "The government does not need permission from K P Yohannan to set up airport in the Cheruvally estate, BJP national executive member V Muraleedharan said."

Yohannan says that the claims were politically motivated and that the workings of Gospel for Asia and Believers Church are transparent. Further, the rubber estate is an investment to help fund social services among underdeveloped communities and not a personal land grab as opponents have claimed.

The controversies about the estate purchase have been cleared by the Kerala, India, High Court. The findings by Rajamanickam in his report were completely rejected by the court. The court came down heavily on the government and the officer for playing "robin hood" with the owners of the estate. A long standing controversy for Believers Church comes to an end with a clean verdict from the high court of Kerala.

=== U.S. federal lawsuits ===
In 2017, there were two RICO anti-fraud lawsuits active against Gospel for Asia, naming Yohannan and other Gospel for Asia leaders as defendants. One of these lawsuits went to arbitration and the other was settled after three years in which both parties agreed that "all donations designated for use in the field were ultimately sent to the field." Gospel for Asia denies any wrongdoing.
