= Believers Eastern Church =

Pentecostal Christian denomination based in India

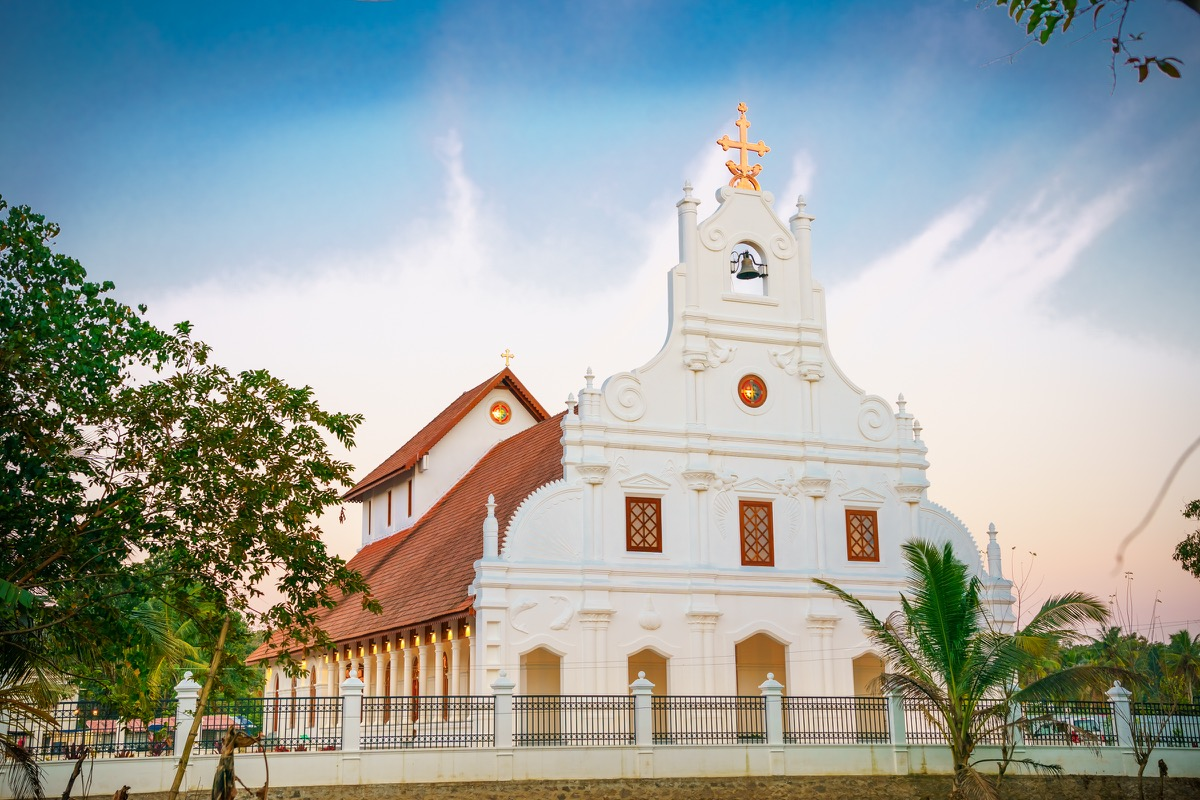
- Classification: Independent Church
- Polity: Episcopal
- Metropolitan bishop: Samuel Mor Theophilus
- Bishops: 30 (2017)
- Dioceses: 91
- Associations: Kerala Council of Churches and National Council of Churches in India
- Liturgy: Orthodox Liturgy
- Headquarters: St. Thomas Community, Thiruvalla, Kerala
- Founder: Moran Mor Athanasius Yohan I Metropolitan
- Origin: 1993
- Members: 3,500,00
- Places of worship: 15000 parishes worldwide
- Hospitals: 3
- Secondary schools: 6+
- Other name: Believers Church (formerly)
- Official website: www.bec.org

Believers Eastern Church (BEC, previously Believers Church) is a church of Indian origin with congregations and parishes worldwide. It follows an episcopal governance and structure. It holds Christ as its head (Col 1:18) and further requires that bishops and ordained ministers submit to its metropolitan and his successors. It is governed by a committee of bishops, the synod, with one central bishop holding the honorary title of "first among equals" and follows Evangelical Christian doctrine. BEC is administratively based in the state of Kerala in southwestern India. The church has 91 dioceses in 14 nations. It claims a membership of more than 3.5 million in 10 countries speaking a hundred languages. It has 30 bishops, and the Metropolitan Bishop is Moran Mor Samuel Theophilus who replaced Moran Mor Athanasius Yohan I Metropolitan (formerly known as K. P. Yohannan).

== History ==
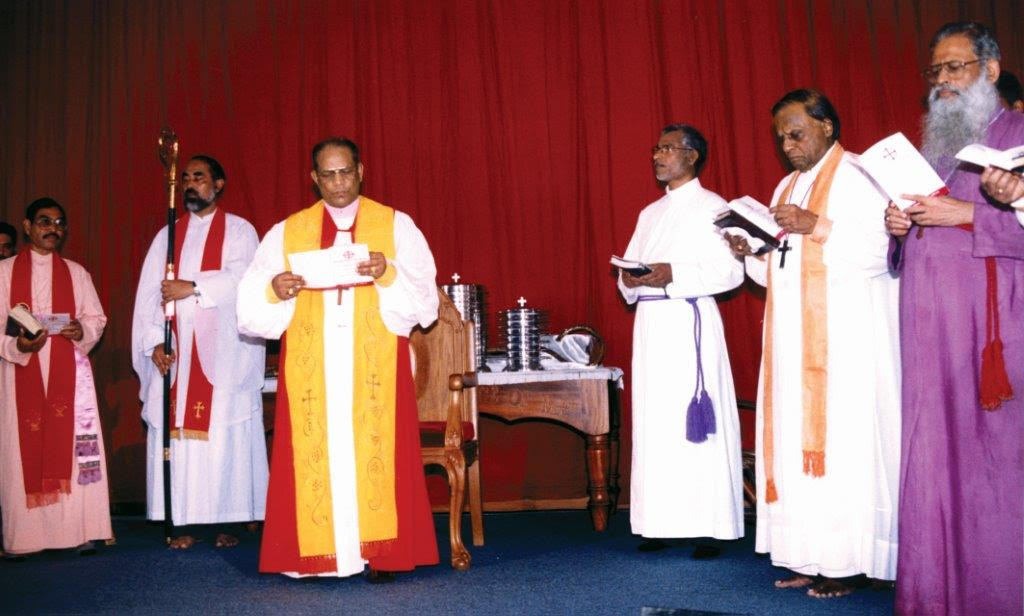
Consecration of Metropolitan Yohan by Bishop K J Samuel. Mar Aprem Mooken and other bishops alongside

The Church was founded in 1993 as part of the GFA World (formerly Gospel for Asia) apostolate. On 6 February 2003, K. J. Samuel, the Moderator Bishop of the Church of South India (a part of the worldwide Anglican Communion), along with the P. M. Dhotekar, Bishop of Nagpur of the Church of North India, and Bancha Nidhi Nayak, Bishop of Phulbani of the Church of North India, consecrated K. P. Yohannan as a bishop in Anglican lines of apostolic succession. Bishop John Wilson Gladstone, Mar Aprem Mooken, Metropolitan of the Assyrian Church of the East in India (Chaldean Syrian Church) were also present for the consecration ceremony. K. P. Yohannan thereafter became the first metropolitan of the Believers Eastern Church, and acquired an episcopal polity of ecclesiastical governance. He later changed his name to Moran Mor Athanasius Yohan Metropolitan in honor of his beloved patron saints, St. Athanasius, the defender of orthodoxy, and St. John (Yohan) the Apostle & Evangelist . BEC describes itself as being "Apostolic in origin, universal in nature, Biblical and evangelical in faith, ecumenical in outlook". It adheres to the Nicene Creed, biblical faith, and traditions of the historical church backed up with its own canonical constitution. The Episcopal Synod and the diocesan councils take the responsibility for planning and executing the mission, religious life and charitable programs of the Church. The Believers Eastern Church is divided as regions into dioceses, each with its own bishop. Each local church has members ranging from less than one hundred to a thousand with an average of a hundred, and the number of parishes themselves are increasing. The BEC is divided into various dioceses under the leadership of a diocesan bishop or a vicar-general.

In 2009, the church ordained seven bishops. On 2 March 2017, Metropolitan Yohan consecrated twelve bishops for the Believers Eastern Church.

== Emblem ==
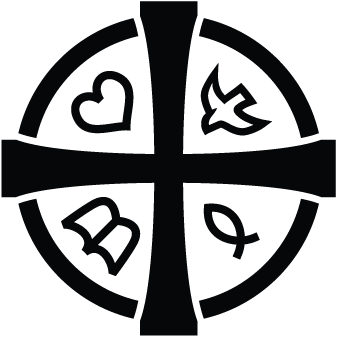

The emblem of the Believers Eastern Church reflects its core beliefs, featuring a cross within a circle, surrounded by a dove, heart, book, and fish—symbols of faith. The cross, chosen by early Church fathers, represents Jesus Christ's crucifixion, death, and resurrection. It extends beyond the circle, signifying that Christ's redemptive work transcends time and is central to the faith. The circle represents eternity.

== Faith and practice ==
The liturgy used in the Believers Eastern Church "includes prayers, Scripture readings and a confession of the Nicene or Apostles' Creed of the Church". The readings come from the Revised Common Lectionary, which has a three-year cycle; it observes the liturgical calendar of Western Christianity, thus keeping Lent, for example. It administers the sacraments of Baptism and Holy Communion. Women in churches of this denomination wear Christian headcoverings, in accordance with Believers Eastern Church's interpretation of 1 Corinthians 11:2–16. Communicants of BEC use the sign of the cross in their prayers.

== Beliefs ==
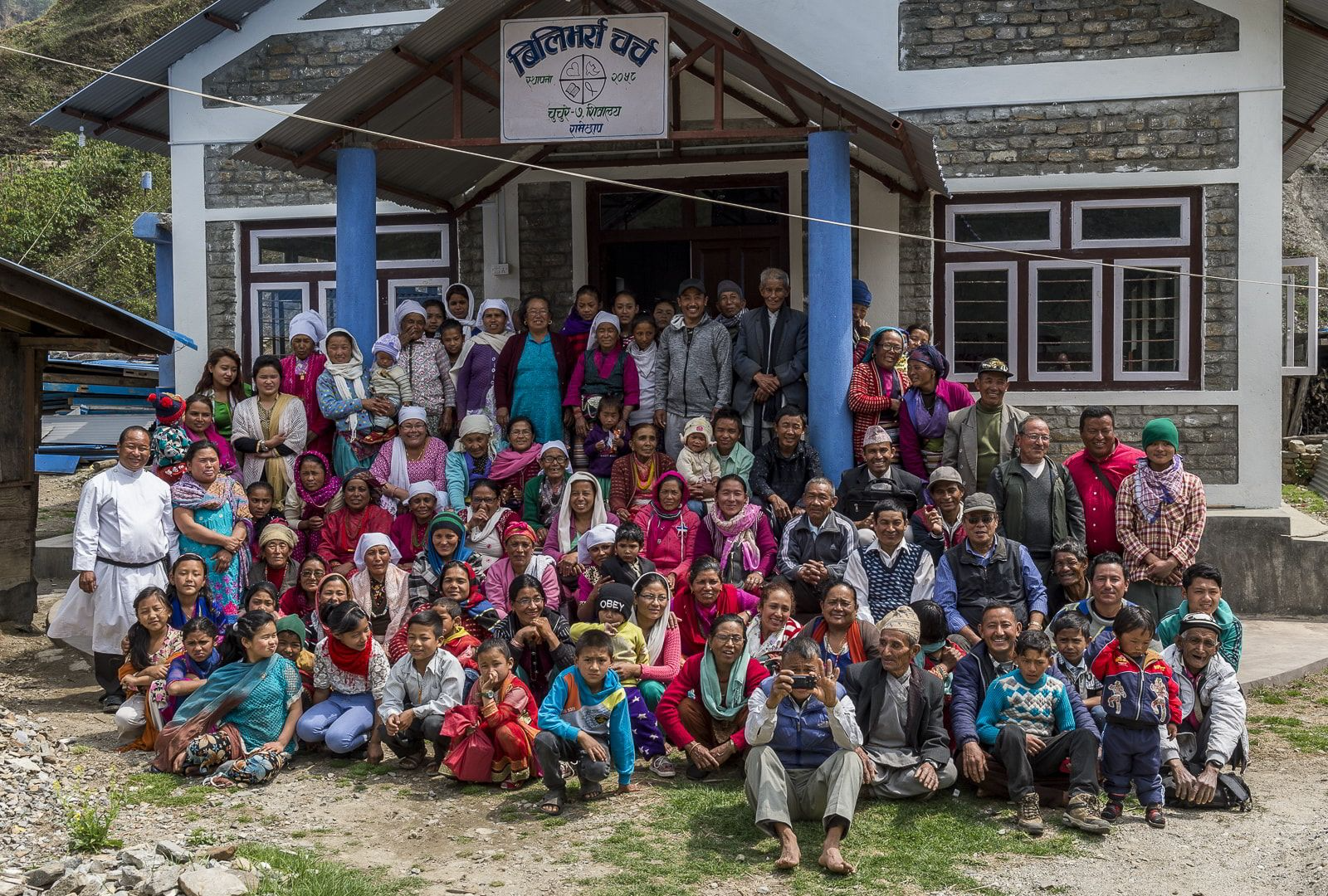
A group photo of believers in front of their church building in Asia

The church accepts the Old Testament and New Testament of the Bible as the inspired Word of God which is inerrant and the fundamental standard of faith, and complete and final written revelation of God. It also adheres to the Nicene Creed. The church believes in the following doctrines:

- One eternal God revealed in the trinity: Father, Son and Holy Spirit.
- The divinity and humanity of Jesus Christ, his virgin birth, sinless life, crucifixion and resurrection, ascension and intercession of the Holy Spirit.
- The outpouring of the Holy Spirit upon believers in Jerusalem after Jesus' ascension, enabling them to preach the Gospel to the whole world.
- Separation of all mankind from God through man's sin.
- Immediate forgiveness of sins through repentance and acceptance of Jesus Christ.
- The person and work of indwelling and empowerment of the Holy Spirit through baptism for all believers.
- The practice of gifts of the Holy Spirit within scriptural guidelines for the common good (1Cor 12:4–7); Considers that agape love is more important than all the gifts, and without it, all exercise of spiritual gifts as worthless.
- Jesus Christ as the head of the church.
- The second coming of Jesus Christ and it will be personal and visible, which motivates active involvement of the laity in church activities.
- The resurrection of the body unto eternal life for the saved and unto eternal separation for the lost; But salvation, redemption and forgiveness are freely offered to all by the grace of our Lord Jesus Christ.

== Religious orders ==
The Sisters of Compassion is a religious order of nuns within the Believers Eastern Church that is dedicated to serving the "neglected of society".

== Humanitarian services ==
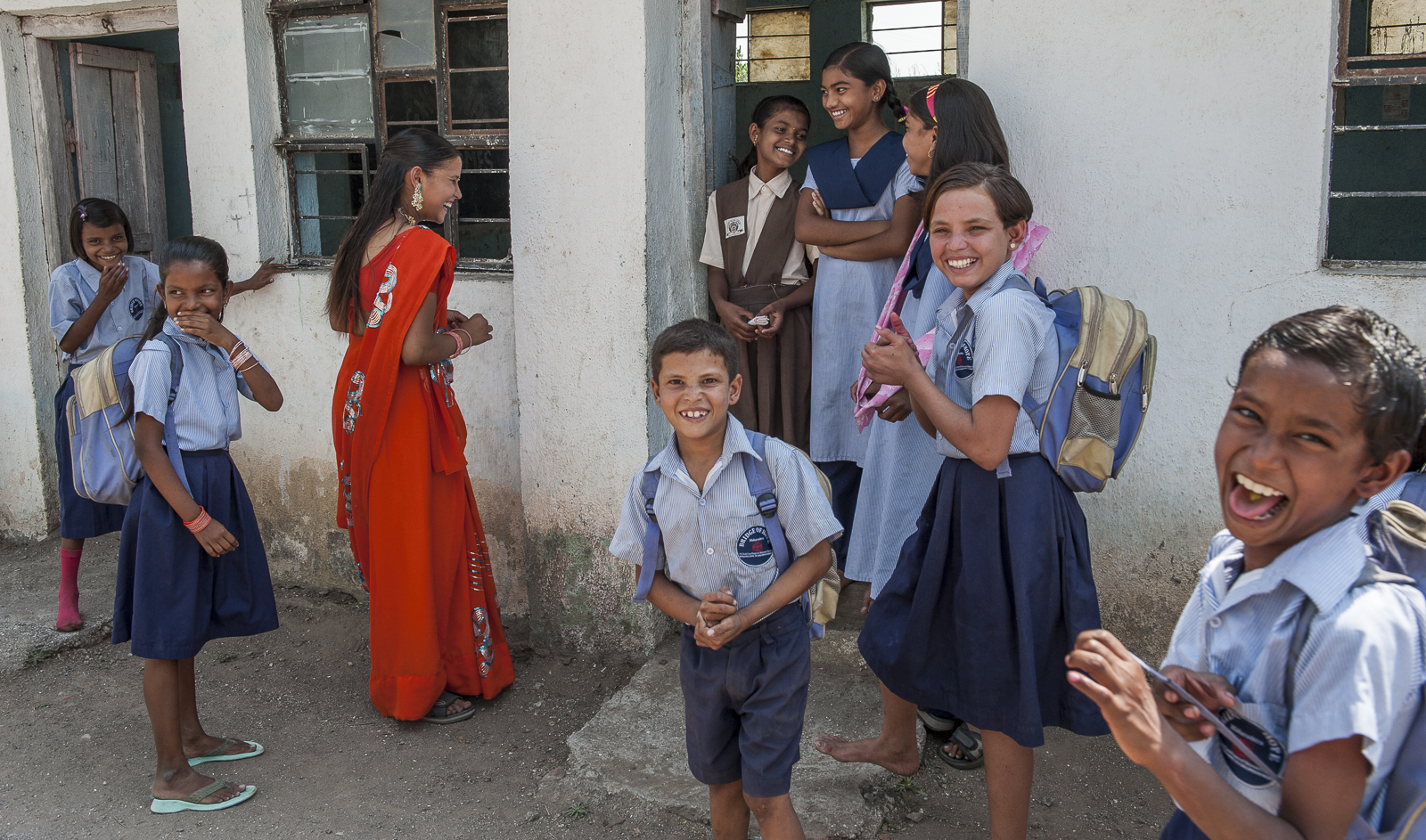
Child Sponsorship Program students on their way to class

Believers Eastern Church is involved in various social projects and has been lauded for its "humanitarian service towards the society at large". The church's social service includes poverty alleviation, and promoting adult literacy. The church also provides shelter to street children through a home called Asha Grih, which is licensed by the Indian Government. Additionally, BEC has a child sponsorship program which provides holistic development to needy children throughout South Asia. As of 2012, the program has helped some 60,000 underprivileged children by providing them free education, a nutritious diet and school supplies. The church sponsorship program has 525 project centers with 2,400 staff. Other major projects include the Believers Church Medical College Hospital, Believers Eastern Church Caarmel Engineering College and Believers Church Theological Seminary.

== Criticisms ==
The operations of Gospel for Asia and BEC were scrutinized after Believers Eastern Church, under the guidance of Moran Mor Athanasius Yohan Metropolitan purchased a 2,268-acre (9.18 km^{2}) rubber estate in Kerala, India. Opponents said the church had diverted foreign funds to amass land for itself and for uses other than declared purposes. Further, it was alleged that the rubber estate, which Believers Eastern Church purchased from Harrison's Malayalam Ltd., was on leasehold from the government and not saleable. Legal proceedings are still ongoing.

There is also been an ongoing court case regarding the illegal filling in of wetlands in order to build the Believers Eastern Church Medical College Hospital.

Moran Mor Athanasius Yohan Metropolitan said that the claims were politically motivated and that the workings of Gospel for Asia and Believers Eastern Church are transparent. Further, the rubber estate is an investment to help fund social service activities among underdeveloped communities and not a personal land grab as opponents have stated.

In 2017, the Ministry of Home Affairs had suspended the Foreign Contribution Regulation Act (FCRA) licenses of the church and three NGOs associated with Believers Eastern Church from receiving foreign funds. It is mandatory to have FCRA clearance from the Home Ministry for any organization to receive foreign funds. The trust enjoyed exemption under the I-T Act, 1961 as charitable/religious trust, receiving donations from foreign countries ostensibly for helping the poor and destitute and evangelical purposes. The government has reconsidered the decision to allow prior permission to two NGOs after detailed verification.

In 2020, the Income Tax officials conducted searches at around 60 premises associated with the Believers Church. The I-T officials seized Rs 14.5 cr from the raid at the offices of Believers church. Out of the total amount, Rs 7 cr was recovered from the boot of a car owned by an employee of the hospital under Believers church. Rest of the amount was seized from various places including Delhi. I-T officials revealed that they are looking into transactions over the last ten years. The church had got around Rs 4,000 crore over the years and a chunk of it had gone into the construction of institutions and real estate dealings.

== Ecumenical relations ==
Believers Eastern Church is a member of The National Council of Churches in India and the Kerala Council of Churches. It has also held ecumenical contacts with the Anglican Church in North America.

== See also ==
- History of Pentecostalism in India
- Believers Church Airport
