= Thiruvalla =

City in Kerala, India

- Municipality
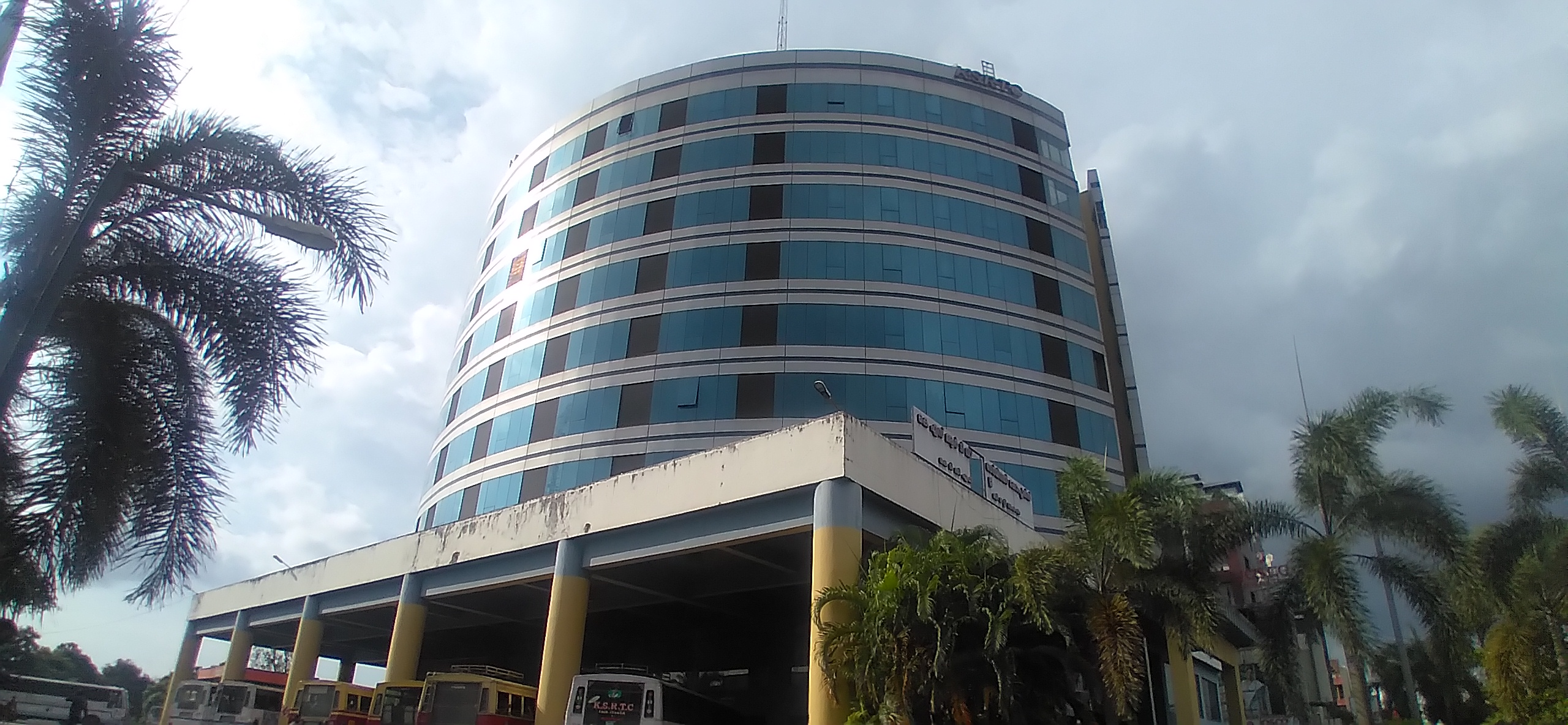
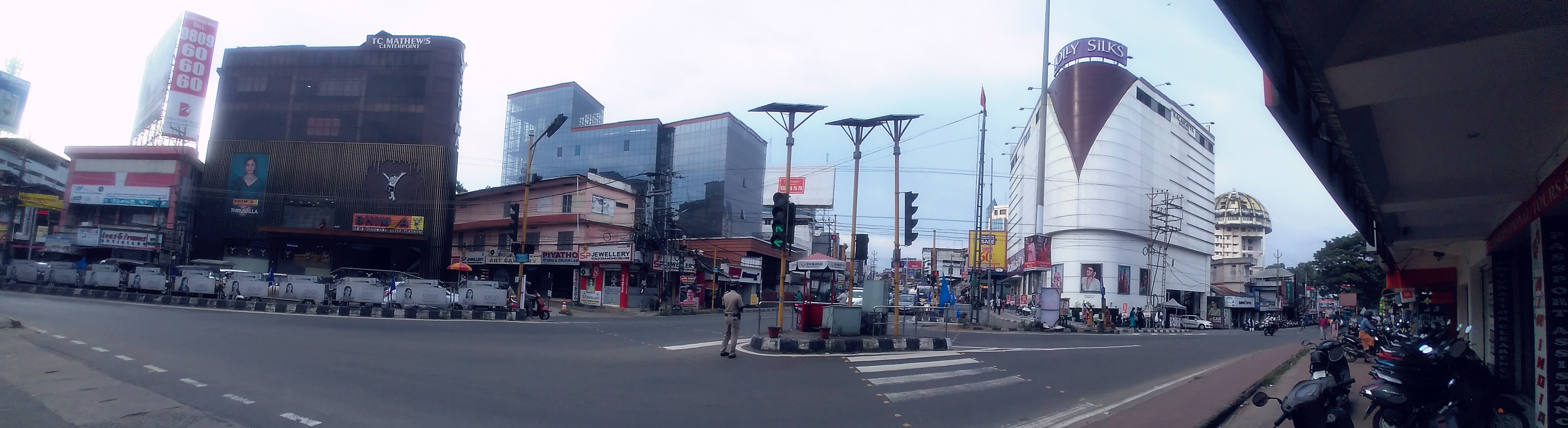
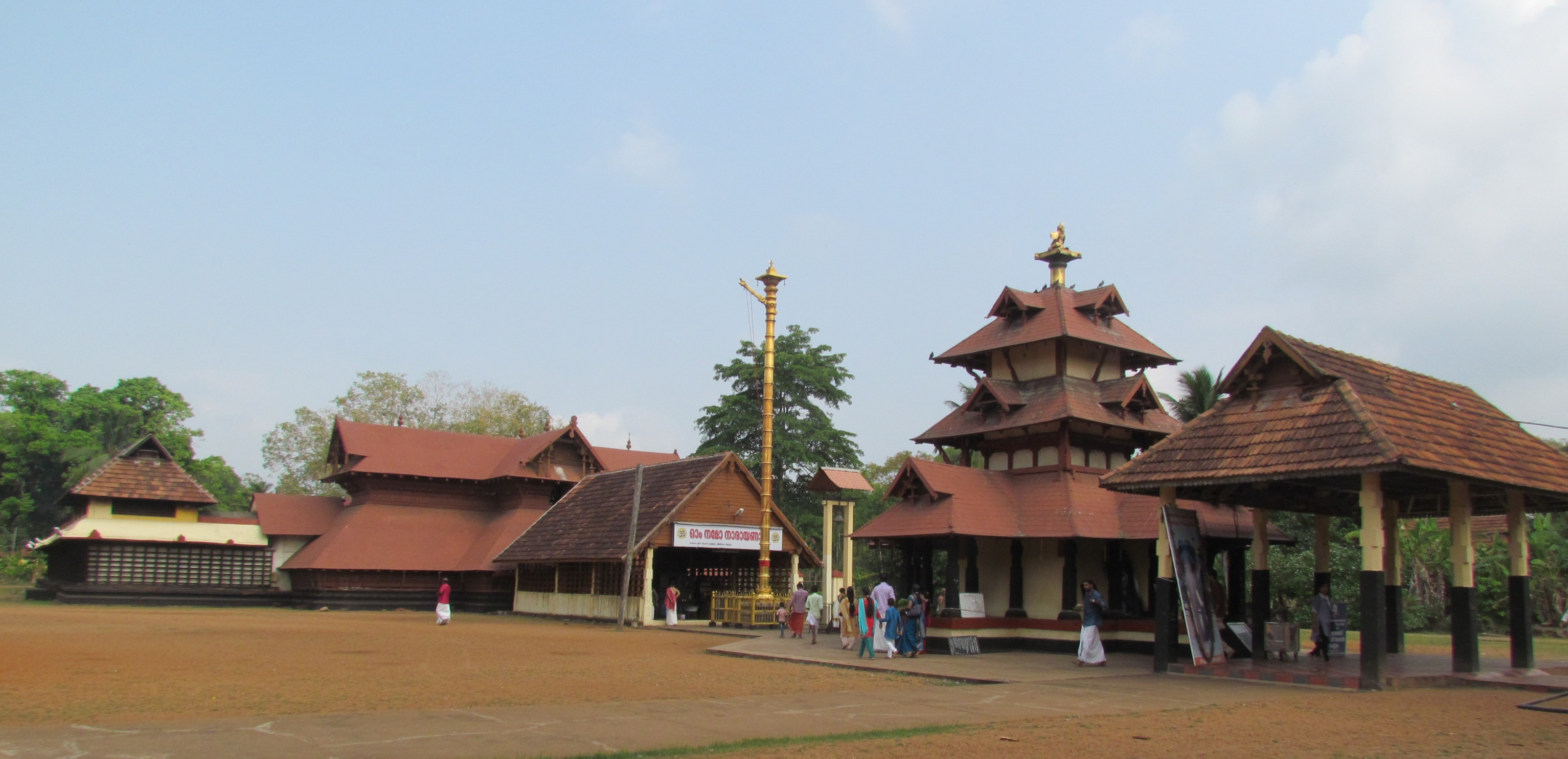
- From top to bottom: 1.KSRTC Terminal Complex is one of its four BOT depots 2.Panoramic view of SCS Junction. 3.Sreevallabha Temple

- Location in Kerala, India
- Coordinates: 9°23′08″N 76°34′32″E
- Country: India
- State: Kerala
- District: Pathanamthitta

Area
  - Total: 27.15 km^{2} (10.48 sq mi)
- Elevation: 14 m (46 ft)

Population (2011)
  - Total: 52,883
  - Density: 1,948/km^{2} (5,050/sq mi)

Languages
  - Official: Malayalam, English
- Time zone: UTC+5:30 (IST)
- PIN: 689101
- Telephone code ii: 91-469
- Vehicle registration: KL-27
- Website: www.thiruvallamunicipality.lsgkerala.gov.in

Thiruvalla, (Malayalam: [t̪iɾuʋɐlːɐ]) also spelled Tiruvalla, is a municipality in Pathanamthitta district, Kerala, India. The town is spread over an area of 27.15 km^{2} (10.48 sq mi) and has a population of 52,883 people, down from 56,837 in 2001. It is also the headquarters of Thiruvalla revenue division. It lies on the northern banks of the Manimala River, in a land-locked region surrounded by irrigating canals and rivers. It is the largest town in the district, and is a major financial, educational, healthcare and commercial centre in central Travancore. It is also called the healthcare city & banking capital of Kerala. Thiruvalla taluk has a land area of 154 km^{2} (59 sq mi).

== Etymology ==
There are two theories as to the origin of the name "Thiruvalla".

According to tradition, the name Thiruvalla comes from the word "Valla Vaay", named after the river Manimala which used to be known as Vallayār. Before the development of proper roads, Thiruvalla developed at the mouth of the Vallayār, and connected various places through waterways, and hence was known as Valla vāy (with the word vāy meaning 'mouth of a river' in old Malayalam). Later, the Malayalam Prefix "Thiru" (used to signify something revered) was added, and thus became "Thiruvalla".

The second theory comes from the 10th-century Sanskrit work "śrīvallabha kṣētra māhātmyaṁ" (श्रीवल्लभ क्षेत्र माहात्म्यम्). It states that the name comes from one of the major temples in the town – the Sreevallabha Temple. The name Thiruvalla hence comes from the word "śrīvallabhapuraṁ", meaning "the town of Vallabha".

== History ==
=== Ancient period ===
There is plenty of evidence to suggest that the area had been inhabited since 500 BCE, although an organized settlement was only founded around 800 CE. The present-day areas of Niranam, and Kadapra on the western part of Thiruvalla were submerged under the sea before then. It is one of the 64 ancient brahmana graamams.

Stone axes have been reported from Thiruvalla, belonging to Neolithic Age. Thiruvalla has many Neolithic remains and got civilized earlier. The Aryan culture presented Thiruvalla as one of the 64 Brahmin settlements of Kerala, and one of the important too. Ptolemy mentions the Baris river, the present "Pamba" river.

Thiruvalla was also an important commercial centre with the Niranam port in olden days, which is described by Pliny as "Nelcynda". At this light, the "Bacare" could have been modern "Purakkad". The fact that modern western Thiruvalla contains the coastal kind of sand, and several seashells in the soil despite being landlocked proves that prior to the reclamation of Kuttanad from sea, Niranam and the whole western Thiruvalla could have been a coastal area.

=== The rise of feudalism ===
Up to the beginning of the 10th century CE, Ays were the dominant powers in Kerala. The Ay kings ruled from Thiruvalla in the North to Nagercoil in the South. Ptolemy mentions this as from Baris (Pamba River) to Cape Comorin "Aioi" (Kanyakumari). By 12th century, we get the picture from the Thiruvalla copper plates, which are voluminous records that centre around the social life around the temple. The society "The Thiruvalla temple" had a large Vedic learning school (actually comparable to modern university) ("Thiruvalla salai"), which was one of the foremost learning centres in Kerala. The Thiruvalla salai was one of the richest among the Vedic schools of Kerala, and according to the copper plates, the pupils of the school were fed with 350 nazhis of paddy every day, which shows the vastness of its student population. Thiruvalla held a very eminent position among the spiritual and educational centres in ancient times. The Sri Vallabha Temple was one of the wealthiest temples of ancient Kerala, as is evident from the inscriptions in the plates. The part of the temple land required to 'feed the Brahmins' required 2.1 million litres of rice seeds, and for the "maintenance of the eternal lamps" required more than 340,000 litres of paddy seed capacity. Due to the length, the antiquity and the nature of the language, Thiruvalla copper plates form the "First book in Malayalam", according to Prof. Elamkulam.

=== Early Modern period ===
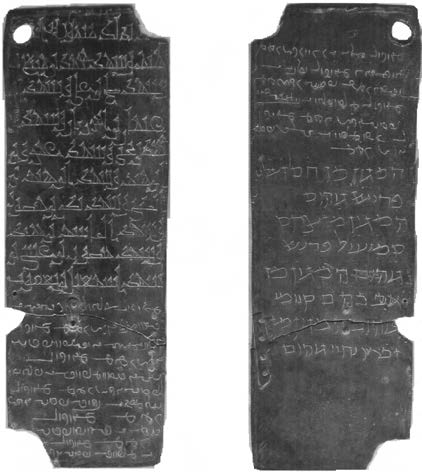
Thiruvalla copper plates

The rulers of Thiruvalla now belonged to the Thekkumkoor Dynasty, which had one of its headquarters at Idathil near Kaavil Temple. Idathil (Vempolinadu Edathil Karthavu) was the family name of the Thekkumkoor kings. Today's Paliakara Palace is a branch of Lakshmipuram Palace of Changanacherry, which is a branch of Alikottu Kovilakam of Pazhancherry in Malabar. Similarly, Nedumpuram Palace is a branch of Mavelikkara Palace is an heir to the Valluvanad tradition of South Malabar.

The Thekkumkoor kings lost their control in the course of time and Vilakkili (വിലക്കിലി) Nampoothiris were rulers in 1752–1753 when Anizham Thirunal Marthanda Varma, the king of Travancore, seized it in a bloody battle in which the ruler was killed, though some dispute it, saying the surrender was peaceful as the Namboothiris were so naïve as to challenge the mighty army of Ramayyan, the shrewd and sadistic Dalava (ദളവ)- head of administration and advisor – of Travancore.

== Geography and climate ==
Thiruvalla lies at an altitude of 14 meters above sea level, along the north bank of the Manimala river. Thiruvalla is criss-crossed by many natural canals (known as "thodu" in Malayalam) like Chanthathodu and Manippuzha.

Thiruvalla and its adjacent areas display great varieties of soil due to its position between the low-lying Kuttanad region and the Midlands. The downtown area has riverine alluvial soil, the eastern parts (classified under the "Southern Midlands" agro-ecological zone) have a laterite loam, and the western parts near Niranam (classified under the Kuttanad agro-ecological zone) have sandy soil resembling that of beaches. The Niranam region has a sandy-type soil as before the reclamation of Kuttanad from the Vembanad Lagoon the area originally was situated on its shores. The Upper Kuttanad region also has the "Karappadam" type of soil. This soil resembles clay loam in texture, has high organic matter content, and is found in areas about 1–2 m above sea level.

Thiruvalla has a tropical monsoon climate. There is significant rainfall in most months of the year. The short dry season has little effect on the overall climate. The Köppen-Geiger climate classification is Am. The temperature here averages 27.3 °C. In a year, the average rainfall is 3298 mm.

Climate data for Thiruvalla
Month	Jan	Feb	Mar	Apr	May	Jun	Jul	Aug	Sep	Oct	Nov	Dec	Year
Mean daily maximum °C (°F)	31.3 (88.3)	31.7 (89.1)	32.7 (90.9)	32.7 (90.9)	32 (90)	29.8 (85.6)	29.8 (85.6)	29.8 (85.6)	30 (86)	30 (86)	30 (86)	30.7 (87.3)	30.9 (87.6)
Mean daily minimum °C (°F)	22.5 (72.5)	23.4 (74.1)	24.7 (76.5)	25.4 (77.7)	25 (77)	23.9 (75.0)	23.9 (75.0)	23.8 (74.8)	24 (75)	23.8 (74.8)	23.5 (74.3)	22.6 (72.7)	23.9 (74.9)
Average precipitation mm (inches)	22 (0.9)	35 (1.4)	60 (2.4)	155 (6.1)	320 (12.6)	596 (23.5)	542 (21.3)	372 (14.6)	284 (11.2)	326 (12.8)	210 (8.3)	54 (2.1)	2,976 (117.2)
Source: http://en.climate-data.org/location/59916

At an average temperature of 29.0 °C, April is the hottest month of the year. July has the lowest average temperature of the year. It is 26.4 °C. Between the driest and wettest months, the difference in precipitation is 574 mm. Precipitation is the lowest in January, with an average of 22 mm. With an average of 596 mm, the most precipitation falls in June.

Due to its proximity to the equator, Thiruvalla has very little variation in average temperature. During the year, the average temperatures vary by 2.6 °C.

Thiruvalla is known for its pleasant and welcoming weather. South West Monsoon winds bring heavy showers to Thiruvalla in the months of August for a couple of months. The best time to visit this historical town is after the rains as the healthy showers of monsoon leave this place lush green and pristine.

== Demographics ==
Historical population
Year	Pop.	±%
1901	7,969	—
1911	12,010	+50.7%
1921	14,489	+20.6%
1931	18,002	+24.2%
1941	18,002	+0.0%
1951	20,709	+15.0%
1961	24,242	+17.1%
1971	26,683	+10.1%
1981	29,225	+9.5%
1991	54,780	+87.4%
2001	56,837	+3.8%
2011	52,883	−7.0%
* 1991: Rise in population due to merger of Kuttapuzha village

As per the 2011 Indian census, Thiruvalla has a population of 52,883 and a population density of 1,948 inhabitants per square kilometre (5,050/sq mi). Of this, 48% are males and 52% are female. 7.48% of the population is under 6 years of age. Scheduled Castes and Scheduled Tribes constitute 8.49% and 0.45% of the population respectively. The total literacy rate was 97.64% (98.05% for males and 97.28% for females), which is higher than the state average of 94% and the national average of 74.04%.

=== Religion ===
Religion in Thiruvalla (2011)
1. Christianity (48.0%)
2. Hinduism (46.9%)
3. Islam (4.80%)
4. None (0.21%)
5. Other (0.06%)

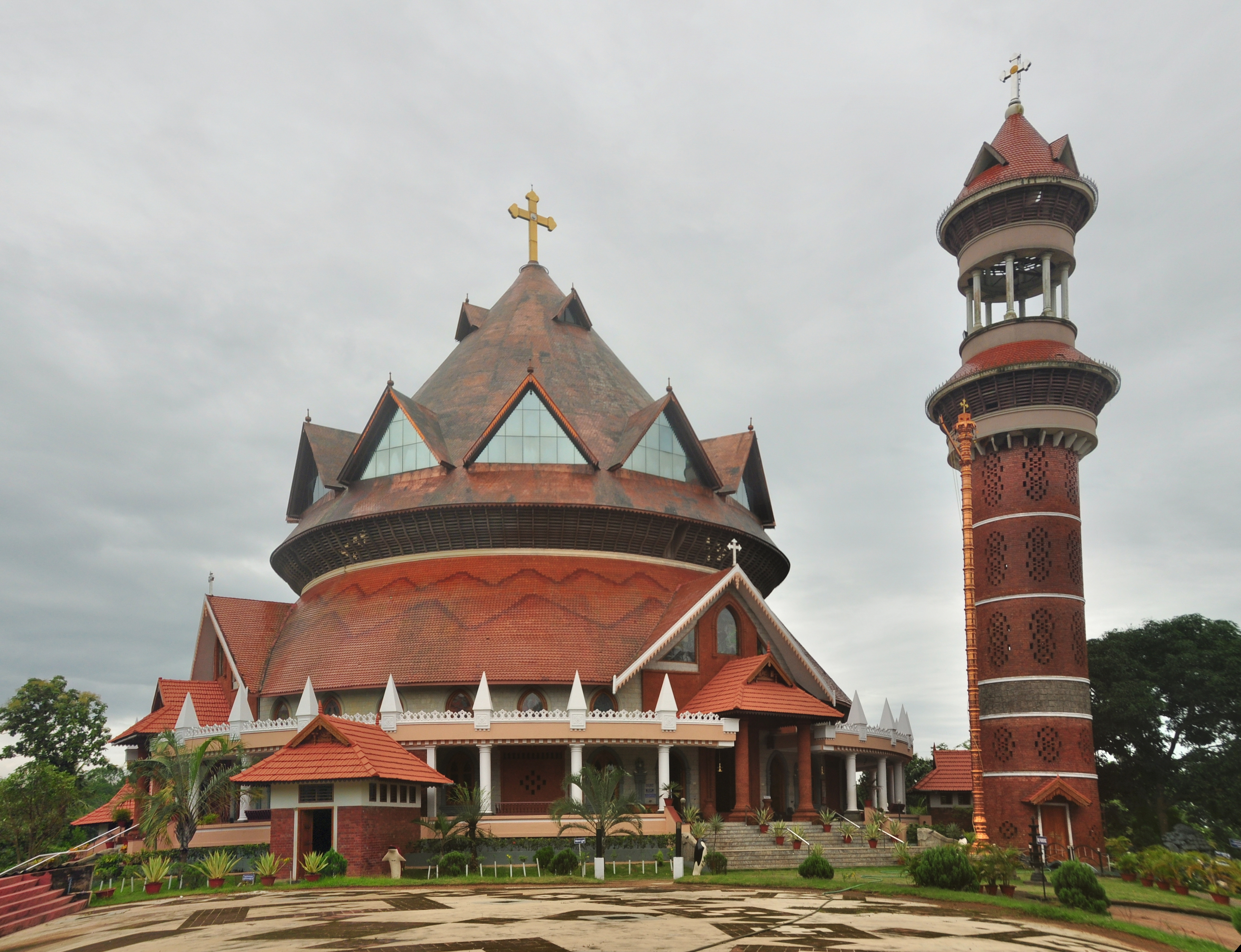
St. John's Cathedral

According to the 2011 census, Christians are the plurality with 48% of the population adhering to the religion. The majority of these Christians belong to the St. Thomas Christian community and their respective Orthodox Churches. Hindus form a significant minority, constituting 46% of the population. Muslims constitute 5% of the population.

Thiruvalla is home to the Sree Vallabha Temple which is the only one of its kind in the State to have Kathakali performed as a ritual offering almost every night.

== Administration and government ==
Thiruvalla’s current chairperson, vice-chairperson, and secretary are Smt. Anu George, Shri. Gigi Wattacheril, and Shri. Deepesh R. K. respectively.

The current MLA is Adv. Mathew T Thomas and the current MP of Pathanamthitta (Lok Sabha constituency) is Anto Antony.

== Sports ==
The popular sports in Thiruvalla are football and cricket. The football history of Thiruvalla can be traced back to the legendary footballer from Thiruvalla, Thenmadom Varghese, called "Tiruvalla Pappan". He represented India in the London Olympics of 1948, and is described as one of the best defenders of the 40s and the 50s from India. Today, Thiruvalla hosts many district and state-level football and cricket tournaments. There is a stadium in Thiruvalla maintained by the Thiruvalla Municipal Council. This is the venue for most of the tournaments. It is also called "Prithi stadium".

=== Indoor Cricket ===
The Kerala Cricket Association has set up an indoor cricket stadium complex in Thiruvalla, with 24-7 practising facilities. The facility is adjacent to the Thiruvalla Public Stadium and has an area of 8000 sq ft, on 50 cents of land. The facility also houses a library, multi-gym, board room, KCA district office, and a conference hall. The wicket includes specially-made natural grass in its design. According to the Kerala Cricket Association, “The facility in Thiruvalla is, perhaps, the first of its kind in the State.”

== Food and other cultural activities ==
Thiruvalla hosts cultural events including flower shows and food fests.

== Notable persons ==
- Anna Rajam Malhotra, Indian Administrative Service officer
- Aju Varghese, Movie Actor
- Thenmadom Varghese, Indian professional footballer
- Poykayil Yohannan, social activist, poet
- Vennikkulam Gopala Kurup, poet
- Abraham Kovoor, hypnotherapist and rationalist
- Abu Abraham, cartoonist
- M.M. Thomas, former Governor of Nagaland
- Baselios MarThoma Didymos I, Malankara Metropolitan and Catholicos of Malankara Orthodox Syrian Church
- Babu Thiruvalla, movie director and producer
- Blessy, movie director
- C. K. Ra, artist
- C.P. Mathen, banker and founder of the Quilon Bank
- C J Kuttappan, folklore artist
- Col. Jojan Thomas, military officer
- John Abraham, movie director
- K. G. George, movie director
- Stanley George, political strategist
- Kakkanadan, novelist and writer
- Mar Athanasius Yohan I Metropolitan (formerly Dr K.P. Yohannan Metropolitan), Metropolitan Bishop of Believers Eastern Church
- Mariamma Chedathy, Dalit folklorist
- Mathew T. Thomas, politician
- M. G. Soman, movie actor
- Nayanthara (Diana Mariam Kurian), movie actress
- Shalini, movie actress
- Shamlee Babu, child actress in movies
- Kaveri, movie actress
- Meera Jasmine (Jasmine Mary Joseph), movie actress
- Nadiya Moythu, movie actress
- Parvathy Jayaram (Ashwathy Kurup), movie actress
- Oormila Unni (actress), movie actress
- Sreeja Chandran, actress
- Kaviyoor Ponnamma, actress
- Kaviyoor Sivaprasad, film director
- Sidhartha Siva, actor, director
- Samyuktha Varma, movie actress
- Kailash, movie actor
- Rajeev Pillai, movie actor
- Sajeev John, physicist
- Vishnu Vinod, cricketer

== See also ==
- Adoor
- Changanassery
- Chengannur
- Chumathra
- Edathua
- Kattode
- Kozhencherry
- Kuttappuzha
- Mavelikara
- Niranam
- Thakazhy
