= Timeline of Kerala =

Major historical events in Kerala, India

This is a timeline of Kerala History comprising important events which took place in the geographical area that falls within present day Kerala. It overlaps with the history of Indian subcontinent. To read background of these events, read History of Kerala.

Also see List of years in Kerala, List of governors of Kerala and List of chief ministers of Kerala.

== Ancient and prehistoric times ==
=== Before Common Era ===
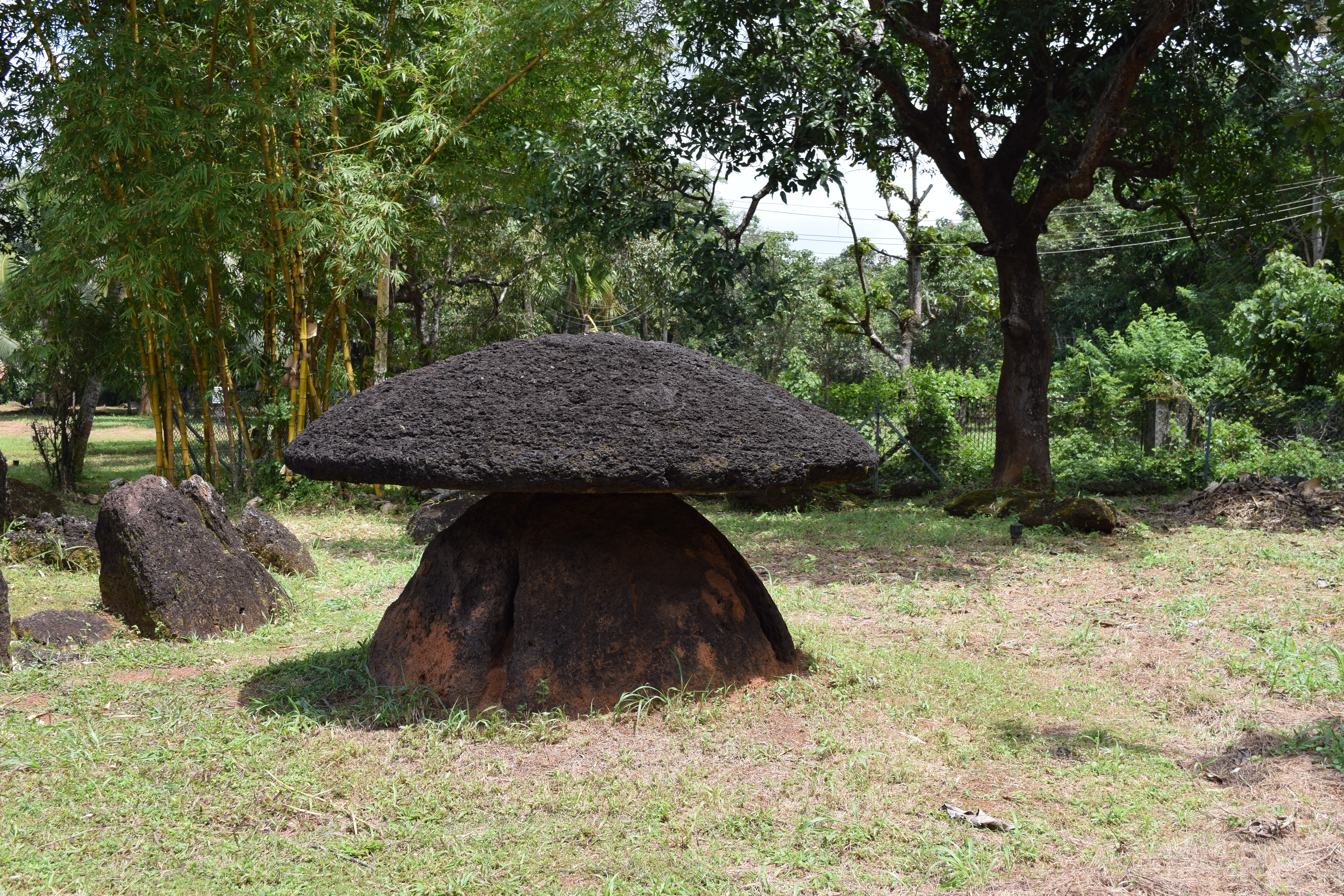
- Kudakallu near Thrissur
  2000 BC – Megalith Burial sites such as Kudakkallu Parambu
- 1500 BC – 500 BC – Dolmen (Muniyara) burial sites at Marayur and Dolmenoid cist in places like Palakkad.
- 257 BC - Ashokan rock edict II mentions about Keralaputra.
- 100 BC – 300 AD – Peak phase of Pattanam.

=== Common Era (CE or AD) ===
- 52 – Thomas the Apostle reaches Kerala to spread Christianity.
- 1st century (50–70 AD) – Periplus of the Erythraean Sea mentions about Cheras and ports of that time like Nelcynda, Limyrike, Muziris etc.
- 77 – Pliny the Elder mentions maritime trade with Kerala in his work.
- 190 - Confederacy of 11 rulers including Chera dynasty lost Battle of Venni.
- 3rd century – Keralaputra finds mention in Ashoka inscriptions.
- 6th century - Nilambur plates
- 624 – Cheraman Juma Mosque, the first Mosque in India established.

== Medieval times ==
=== 8th century ===
- Birth and life time of Adi Shankara
- 748 – Malik Dinar passes away at Thalangara.

=== 9th century ===
- 825 – Malayalam calendar started following establishment of Venadu kingdom by Cheras after defeating Pandyas.
- 832 - Vazhappally copper plate
- 849-50 – Tarisappalli Shasanam
- 869 - Huzur Plates of Kollam mentions about Ay dynasty and Parthasarathy temple, Parthivapuram.
- 871 - Kurumathur inscription
- 898 – Sri Mulavasam chepped/Paliyam copper plates

=== 10th century ===
- 903 - Pandalam dynasty established at Konni.
- 923 – Chokur inscriptions.
- 929 - Ramanthali inscriptions
- 974 - Mampalli copper plate
- 988 - Battle of Kandalur Salai between Chera dynasty and Rajaraja I.
- Thiruvalla copper plates
- Moozhikulam Kacham the first unified devaswom regulation comes into effect.
- Aditya I improves Rajakesari Peruvazhi through Palakkad Gap connecting Chera Empire with Tamilakam.

=== 11th century ===
- 1000 - Jewish copper plates of Cochin
- 1020 -
  - Eramam – Chalappuram inscriptions mentioning Mushika dynasty.
  - Pullur Kodavalam inscription
- 1028 - Thirumittacode inscription
- Trichambaram inscription
- 1083 - Kinalur inscription

=== 12th century ===
- 1102 - Kollam (Rameshwaram Temple) Pillar Inscription
- 1122 - Abdication of throne by Rama Kulasekhara followed by fragmentation of Chera dynasty and rise of regional powers such as Kolathunadu, Nediyiruppu Swaroopam, Venadu kingdom etc. as regional powers.
- 1145 – Perinchellur Chepped (Copper Inscriptions of Perinchellur) that mentions Kolathunadu king Karumpattu Iraman Iravi Varman transacting with Brahmin settlements independently without tutelage of Cheras.

=== 13th century ===
- 1225 – Viraraghava copper plate
- 1292 – 94 – Marco Polo visits Kerala.

=== 14th century ===
- 1341 – Kerala floods
- 1343 – 46 – Ibn Battuta visits Malabar Coast.
- Rise of Kerala school of astronomy and mathematics.

=== 15th century ===
- 1449 September 8 - First mass offered at Akkarapally Kanjirappally.
- 1498 May 20 - Vasco da Gama and crew from Portugal reaches Calicut.

=== 16th century ===
- 1500 September 13 - Pedro Álvares Cabral arrives at Calicut - 2nd Portuguese India Armada (Cabral, 1500)
- 1500 – Treaty of Cochin
- 1501 - Work on Mathematics, Tantrasamgraha published.
- 1501 December 31 – The to day long First Battle of Cannanore.
- 1502 October 30 – Vasco da Gama reaches Calicut as part of 4th Portuguese India Armada (Gama, 1502)
- 1504 March – July – Battle of Cochin
- 1505 October 23 – Francisco de Almeida gets permission from Kolathiri to construct St. Angelo Fort
- 1506 March – Battle of Cannanore (1506)
- 1507 April 27 – August 27 – Siege of Cannanore (1507)
- 1513 December 24 – The thirteen year long First Luso-Malabarese War (Calicut–Portuguese conflicts) comes to an end as a result of treaty between Zamorin and Afonso de Albuquerque of Portuguese India following assassination of former Zamorin.
- 1530 - Publication of Yuktibhāṣā
- 1599 June 20–26 – Synod of Diamper

=== 17th century ===
- 1653 January 3 – Coonan Cross Oath
- 1653 May 22 - Thoma I elected as Bishop by native priests at Alangad.
- 1661 December – Dutch captures St Thomas Fort Quilon from Portuguese.
- 1663 January 7 – Dutch conquest of Malabar comes to an end with capture of Cochin from Portuguese India as a result of Dutch–Portuguese War.
- 1665 - Gregorios Abdal Jaleel recognized and validated the consecration of Thoma I.
- Hortus Malabaricus
  1678 – 1693 – Hendrik van Rheede compiles Itty Achudan's work on Botany as Hortus Malabaricus from Amsterdam.
- 1686 January - Major conflagration destroys Padmanabhaswamy Temple.

=== 18th century ===
- 1708 – British traders established Tellicherry Fort.
- 1721 April – October – Anjengo Revolt
- 1724 – French Indies Company under La Bourdonnais capture Mayyazhi and established a fort.
- 1729 – Anchal Post established in Travancore.
- 1741 August 10 – Battle of Colachel
- 1744 July 5 – Marthanda Varma conducts first Murajapam took place at Padmanabhaswamy Temple in Travancore.
- 1746 - Battle of Purakkad
- 1749 September - Battle of Changanassery and defeat of Thekkumkur.
- 1750 January 3 - Marthanda Varma submits the kingdom before Padmanabhaswamy through Thrippadi Danam.
- 1750 - The first Lakshadeepam at Padmanabhaswamy Temple.
- 1755 - The last Mamankam at Tirunavaya.
- 1756 - 57 - Mysore invasion of Calicut
- 1761 - Cochin–Travancore Alliance (1761) followed by Suchindram Pact next year to combat Mysorean invasion of Malabar.
- 1762 - Raja Kesavadas develops port and canals of Alappuzha.
- 1763 February - East India Company restores Mahé to France following Treaty of Paris (1763).
- 1766 - Ali Raja of Arakkal kingdom develops two and half-mile long Sultan Canal between Kuppam River and Perumba River in Madayi.
- 1766 - 1792 - Mysorean invasion of Malabar
- 1767 - Murdoch Brown of East India Company established 300 acre Browns Cinnamon Estate at Anjarakkandy.
- 1772 -
  - Samkshepa Vedartham printed from Rome becomes the first book printed in Malayalam.
  - Abraham Koorilos I establishes Malabar Independent Syrian Church at Thozhiyoor. It became the first of several groups that split from Malankara Church.
- 1779 December - 1782 January - Siege of Tellicherry.
- 1780 - 90 - Thamarassery Churam route developed by British with help of Karinthandan forming an alternative for lengthy Kuttiyadi route.
- 1789 - 90 - Battle of Nedumkotta
- 1790 - Varthamanappusthakam, the firstever Travelog in an Indian language written by Paremmakkal Thoma.
- 1795 - Dutch Malabar taken over by East India Company following Napoleon's war on Dutch Republic and Kew Letters.
- 1797 – Ambush at Manandery
- 1798 – Sakthan Thampuran started Thrissur Pooram.
- Commencement of Pulavanibham in Kingdom of Cochin following a Smallpox outbreak.

== Modern times ==
=== 19th century ===
==== 1800 – 1850 ====
- 1800 July 1 – Malabar becomes a part of Madras Presidency.
- 1805 November 30 – Pazhassi Raja killed in battle with British.
- 1809 January 11 – Velu Thampi Dalawa did historic proclamation at Kundara against British Raj.
- 1809 January 15 – Battle of Quilon
- 1812 March – May – Kurichiya tribe revolt against British Raj.
- 1812 December 5 – Gowri Lakshmi Bayi prohibits sale of slaves through proclamation in Travancore.
- 1813 – beginning of Channar revolt protests by lower castes to gain rights to cover breasts following John Munro granting upper cloth rights to women who converted to Christianity.
- 1814 August – Anglo-Dutch Treaty of 1814 brings Dutch Malabar permanently under British.
- 1816 November 15 – Zamorin formally loses all political powers following treaty with East India Company.
- 1817 – CMS College Kottayam established as first western education college in Kerala.
- 1821 – Benjamin Bailey establishes C.M.S. Press the first printing press in Kerala.
- 1829 February 3 – Gowri Parvati Bayi issues a royal proclamation that prohibits Nadar women converted to Christianity from covering their breast. Some historians argue that this proclamation led to infamous Breast tax.
- 1830 – Swathi Thirunal Rama Varma permanently shifts Hajoor Kacheri from Kollam to Thiruvananthapuram. Prior to this Hajoor kacheri existed at seat of Diwans which were Mavelikkara and Alappuzha prior to Kollam.
- 1843 April 7 – Slavery abolished in Malabar District through Indian Slavery Act, 1843.
- 1846 – Forest Conservator Chathu Menon established Connolly Plot Nilambur as world's first teak plantation.
- 1847 March 19 – London Missionary Society and Church Mission Society places representation before Marthanda Varma II to abolish slavery and the same was rejected king.
- 1847 June – Hermann Gundert published first Malayalam journal Rajyasamacharam from Tellicherri.

==== 1851 – 1899 ====
- 1855 April – Kingdom of Cochin abolished slavery.
- 1855 June 24 - Travancore abolished slavery.
- 1855 September 11 – District Collector of Malabar District Henry Valentine Conolly assassinated in his official premises in Calicut by Mappilas.
- 1859 July 26 – Channar revolt result in royal decree in Travancore that gives Nadar (caste) women the right to wear upper clothes.
- 1861 March 12 – First railway line in state opened between Beypore and Tirur.
- 1865 - Pandara Patta Vaka Proclamation in Travancore. It became a significant event that changed land rights in the princely state.
- 1869 July - August - The new Hajur Kacheri in Trivandrum completed and offices started functioning.
- 1877 – Punalur Suspension Bridge completed.
- 1880 – Varkala twin Tunnel in TS Canal completed facilitating inland navigation between Thiruvananthapuram Vallakadavu and Quilon.
- 1880 – 1903 – The first phase of Kuttanad kayal reclamation an area of roughly 1764 hectares reclaimed from Vembanad for Paddy cultivation.
- 1883 –
- Mambally Bapu bakes the first Christmas cake in state at Tellicherri.
- Fr. Victor starts a tile factory in Mulagumudu near Nagercoil.
- 1886 October 29 – 999-year lease indenture entered over Mullaperiyar Dam water between Moolam Thirunal and British Secretary of State for Periyar irrigation Works.
- 1886 September - Vicariate Apostolic of Malabar elevated as Archdiocese of Verapoly the first archdiocese in Kerala.
- 1887 - The High Court of Travancore established at Thiruvananthapuram.
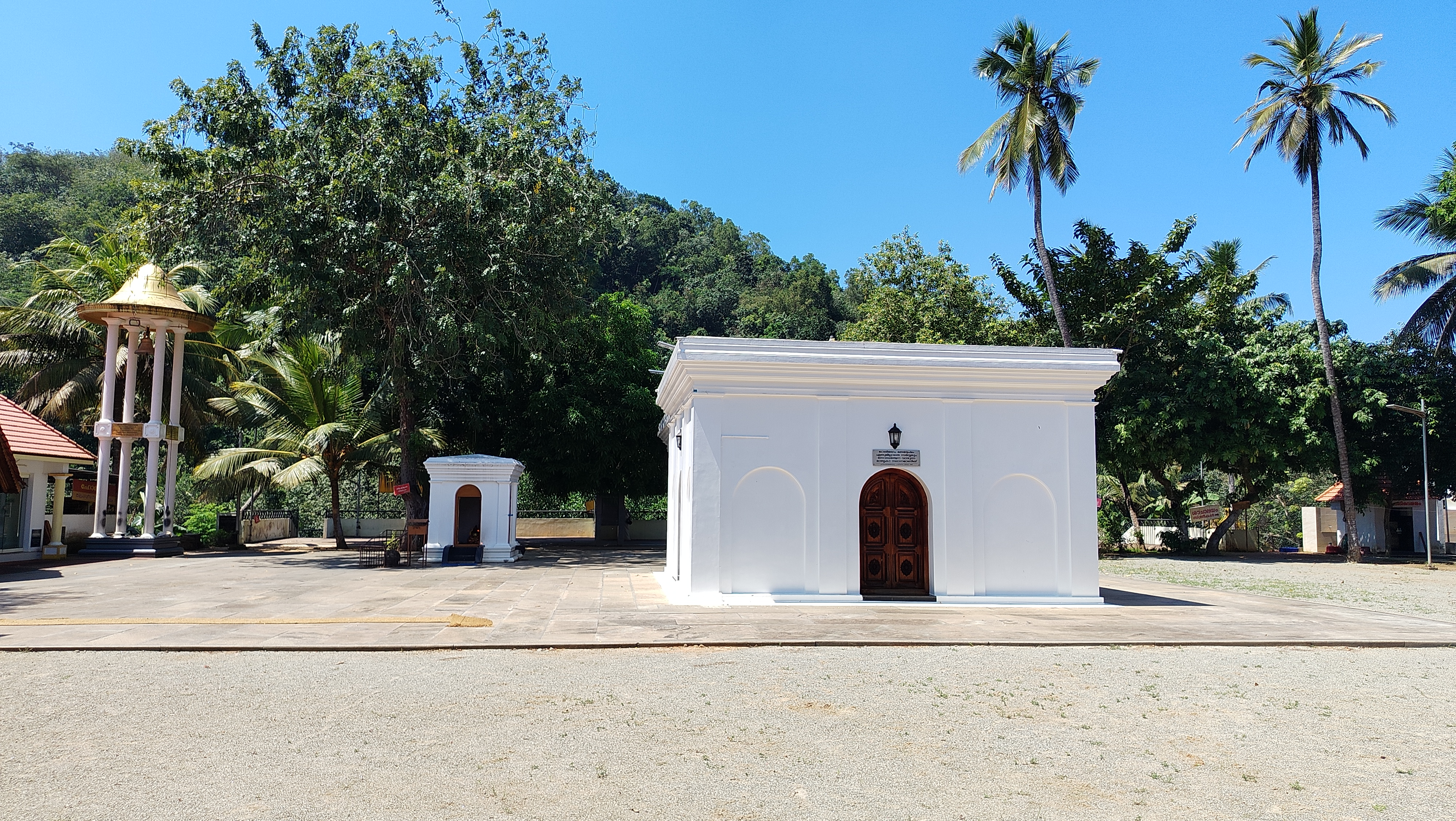
- Aruvipuram Temple
  1888 February – Narayana Guru establishes temple at Aruvippuram against caste system.
- 1888 March 30 – An eight member legislative council established in Travancore.
- 1889 January 4 – Great fire of Cochin
- 1889 December – Indulekha by Oyyarathu Chandu Menon gets published as first novel in Malayalam.
- 1891 January 1 – Malayali Memorial
- 1893 – Villuvandi (Bullock Cart) Samaram by Ayyankali.
- 1895 March 8 – 17 – The first Maramon Convention held.
- 1895 October 10 – Mullaperiyar Dam completes construction and opened.
- 1896 September – Ezhava Memorial Petition
- 1899 - Appu Nedungadi established Nedungadi Bank, the first private commercial Bank in South India.

=== 20th century ===
==== Pre – Independence (1900–1923) ====
- 1900 – Raja's Court of Appeal established as Chief Court of Appeal in Kingdom of Cochin.
- 1900 November 18 – 25 – Lord Curzon visits Kingdom of Cochin and Travancore and he is the first Governor-General of India to visit these states.
- 1902 January - Fire accident at Sabarimala Temple
- 1902 March 27 - Mannanar dynasty comes to an end following murder of Muthetattarmanakal Kunhikelapan Mannanar.
- 1902 July 16 – The first passenger train service in Kingdom of Cochin in Shoranur–Cochin route.
- 1902 – The first viable commercial rubber plantation in Kerala established near Thattekad by John Joseph Murphy and Periyar Syndicate.
- 1903 May 15 – Padmanabhan Palpu formed Sree Narayana Dharma Paripalana Yogam.
- 1904 July 1 – The first train service in Travancore between Kollam–Sengottai commenced.
- 1904 October 22 – Sree Moolam Praja Sabha established with 88 members and first meeting held at VJT Hall.
- 1905 July 13 – The verdict pronounced after Smarthavicharam of Kuriyedathu Thatri.
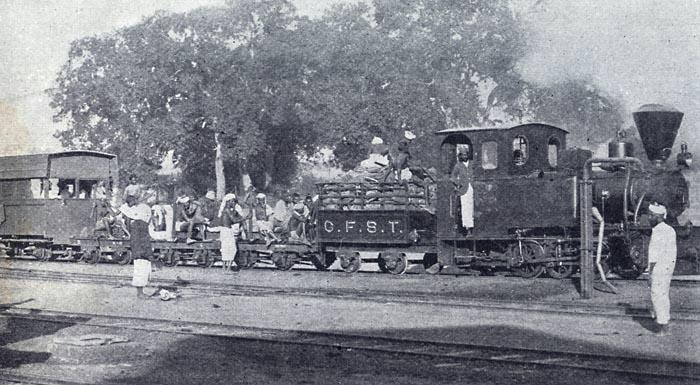
- Cochin State Forest Tramay
  1905 October 3 – Cochin State Forest Tramway commenced operation.
- 1906 - The first indigenous Plague outbreak of Malabar at Calicut. Around 1026 killed over next four years.
- 1910 September 26 - Swadeshabhimani Ramakrishna Pillai arrested and banished from Travancore.
- 1910 - Poykayil Yohannan establishes Prathyaksha Raksha Daiva Sabha as a Dalit Christian sect.
- 1914 October 31 - Mannathu Padmanabha Pillai founds Nair Brithya Jana Sangam.
- 1914 - Kandala Agitation by peasants from lower castes under Ayyankali following denial of education rights to lower castes in Travancore and incident at Ooruttambalam.
- 1914 December 7 - Rama Varma XV of Kingdom of Cochin abdicated throne.
- 1915 October 24 - Kallamaala Samaram
- 1917 May 30 - Sahodaran Ayyappan conducted inter-caste feast (Mishrabhojanam) at Cherai.
- 1920 August 18 – Mahatma Gandhi visits Kerala for the first time. He visits Calicut as part of Khilafat Movement.
- 1920 October - Sree Poornathrayeesa Temple gutted in fire.
- 1920 – The Cochin Nair Regulation Act passed which legalised Sambandam banned Polygamy and streamlined inheritance.
- 1921-22 - Moplah rebellion
- 1921 September 16 - Government order 613 (Communal G.O.) passed by Justice Party in Madras Presidency providing rights for education and jobs to non-brahmin communities.
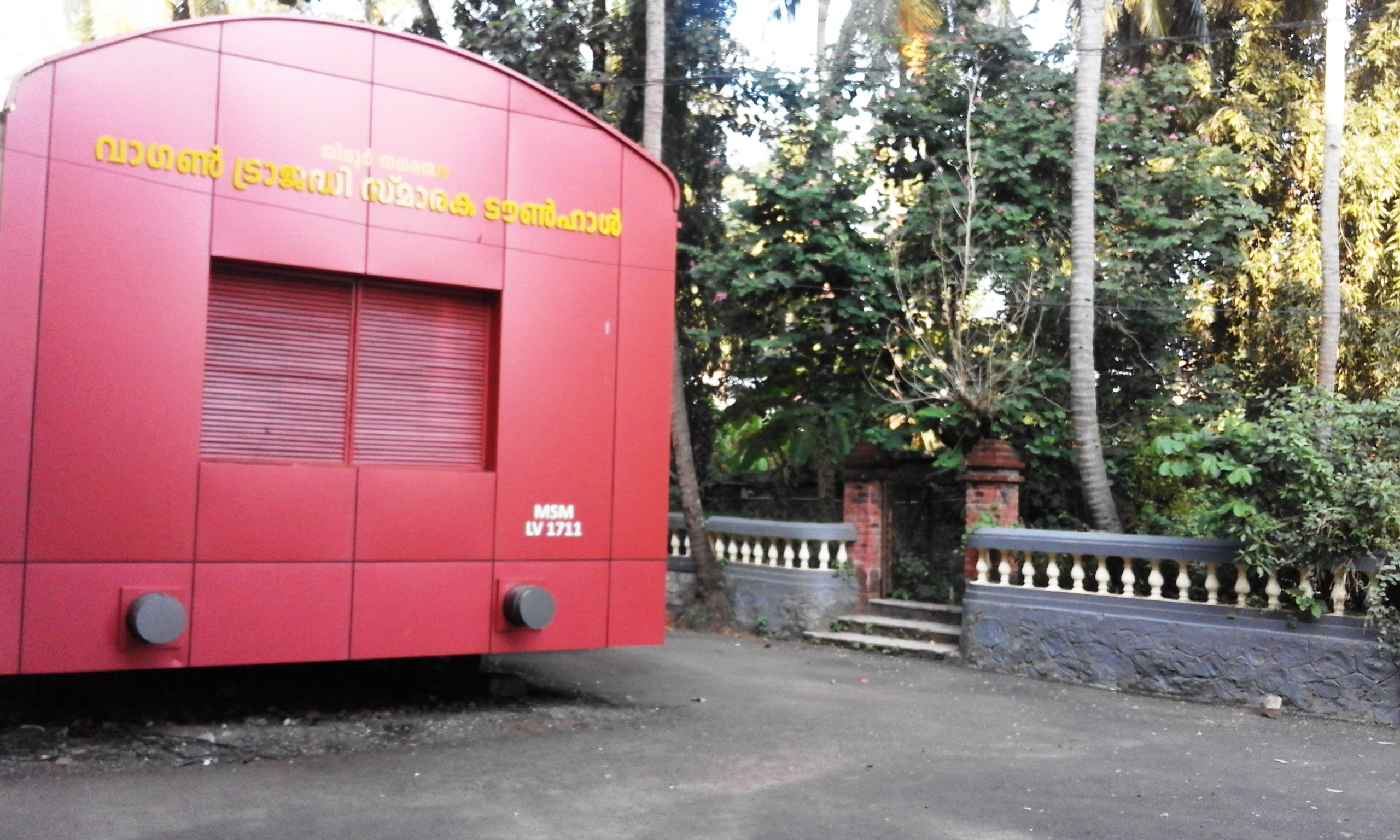
- Wagon Tragedy memorial at Tirur
  1921 November 19 - Wagon tragedy
- 1922 November 15 - Meeting between Rabindranath Tagore and Narayana Guru.
- 1922 – Under the leadership of K. M. Maulavi, K. M. Seethi Sahib and E. Moidu Moulavi, Kerala Muslim Aikya Sangam formed at Kodungallur to reform Islam in Kerala and propagate modern education.

==== Pre – Independence (1924–1935) ====
- 1924 January 16 – Kumaran Asan and 23 others killed in a boat accident in Pallana.
- 1924 March – 1925 November – Vaikom Satyagraha
- 1924 May 19 – C. Sankaran Nair lost defamation case case filed by Michael O'Dwyer.
- 1924 July – Great flood of 99
- 1924 September 25 - Madras Presidency passes G.O. 2660 which grants rights to depressed class to access to public roads right to travel and access to public wells throughout the presidency.
- 1924 November 13 - Palakkad Iyers of Kalpathy attacked Ezhavas who attempted to enter the public roads near agraharam to witness annual car festival.
- 1926 June 26 – Samastha Kerala Jem-iyyathul Ulama formed at Calicut under leadership of Varakkal Mullakoya Thangal to counter reformist organisations among Muslims in Kerala.
- 1926 - Suchindram Satyagraha
- 1927 June 14 - Narayana Guru does mirror consecration at Kalavamkodam Temple Cherthala.
- 1927 October 26 - Nilambur–Shoranur railway line opened by South Indian Railway Company.
- 1927 - The first indigenous Plague outbreak in Travancore at Devikulam taluk.
- 1928 May 26 – The first ship arrives at modern Cochin Port.
- 1930 April 21 – K. Kelappan led satyagrahis manufacture salt at Payyanur beach breaking the Salt laws as part of Salt satyagraha.
- 1930 October 23 – The first Malayalam film Vigathakumaran released.
- 1930 November – Kerala Kalamandalam established at Kunnamkulam subsequently it got transferred to present location.
- 1931–32 – Guruvayur Satyagraha
- 1932 April 1 – Palakkad–Pollachi railway line completed.
- 1932 October 28 – The Travancore Legislative Reforms Act promulgated establishing Bicameralism and bringing in property qualifications for franchise.
- 1932 – Thiruvananthapuram Airport established.
- 1932 December 24 - The first Sivagiri pilgrimage started from Elavumthitta.
- 1933 January 25 – Christians, Muslims and Ezhavas of Travancore starts Abstention movement (Nivarthana Agitation) followed by a Samyuktha Rashtriya Samiti meeting chaired by A. J. John.
- 1933 December 11 - Lord Willingdon inaugurated The Trivandrum Waterworks, a water supply system for the city from Aruvikkara Dam.
- 1935 February 11 - Plague (disease) declared at Kunnamkulam nearly 21 killed in next five months.
- 1935 May 13 – C. Kesavan made historic Kozhencherry speech supporting Abstentionism against Travancore and got arrested for Sedition.

==== Pre – Independence (1936–1947) ====
- 1936 July 1 – Starvation March (Pattini Jaatha) led by A. K. Gopalan from Cannanore to Madras began.
- 1936 November 12 – Temple Entry Proclamation
- 1938 February 20 – Travancore State Transport Department inaugurated and bus service commenced between Thiruvananthapuram and Kanyakumari.
- 1938 June 17 – The court of appeal in Kingdom of Cochin reconstituted as High Court of Cochin with VD Ouseph Vellanikkaran as the Chief Justice.
- 1938 August 31 - Police firing by British forces kills seven at Neyyattinkara.
- 1938 September 26 – October 5 – Kadakkal Revolt
- 1938 September 22–30 – Kallara-Pangode Struggle
- 1938 October 23 – Accamma Cherian leads Rajadhani march from Thampanoor to Kowdiar Palace with 20,000 protestors against ban of Travancore State Congress.
- 1940 March - C. P. Ramaswami Iyer commissions the first Hydroelectric power station at Pallivasal.
- 1940 September 15 – Struggle between police forces and protestors at Morazha and K. P. R. Gopalan gets life imprisonment.
- 1941 March 28 - Kayyur incident
- 1942 October - Plague (disease) breakout in Thrissur claims 16 lives.
- 1942 November 17 - Keezhariyur serial bomb case
- 1942 - 44 - Famine in Travancore during World War II
- 1943 - Malabar Migration
- 1943 March 12 - Chithira Thirunal Balarama Varma inaugurates Travancore State Broadcasting Station.
- 1943 June 22 - Naval base established in Kochi by Royal Navy as HMS Chinkara.
- 1946 January 16 – C. P. Ramaswami Iyer proposes Travancore to be an independent state with American Model constitution with a powerful executive appointed by monarch and universal suffrage.
- 1946 June 23 - Vazhinadakkal Samaram or Kuttamkulam agitation took place in Irinjalakuda by lower castes to gain rights to use roads near Koodalmanikyam Temple.
- 1946 October – Punnapra-Vayalar uprising
- 1946 December 20 – Peasant uprising in Karivellur.
- 1946 December 30 - MSP firing kills five Communists at Kavumbayi, Sreekandapuram.
- 1946 – Malabar Special Police strike and subsequent reduction of companies by British.
- 1947 June 3 – British announces crown paramountcy over princely states including Travancore and Kingdom of Cochin would lapse after transfer of powers to Dominion of India and Pakistan.
- 1947 June 11 – C. P. Ramaswami Iyer announced in a press meet that Travancore is not joining Dominion of India and staying independent.
- 1947 June 18 – Chithira Thirunal Balarama Varma announces Travancore as an independent sovereign nation through Travancore Radio.
- 1947 July 25 – K. C. S. Mani attempted assassination of C. P. Ramaswami Iyer at Trivandrum.
- 1947 July 30 – Travancore signs Instrument of Accession with India.

==== Post Independence ====
- 1947 August 15 - Rama Varma Parikshith Thampuran hoists Flag of India and Flag of Cochin at Durbar Hall Ground at Ernakulam and Flag of India not hoisted at Travancore.
- 1947 December - Three month long Paliyam Satyagraha commenced.
- 1948 April 30 – Eight peasants were killed in firing and two through custodial torture of Malabar Special Police at Onchiam.
- 1948 – Communist Party of India banned following Calcutta Thesis
- 1949 July 1 – Travancore–Cochin formed as a Part B State.
- 1949 December 31 – Sooranad Kalapam.
- 1950 January 24 - Madras State Government commence work of Thekkil Bridge across Chandragiri River to connect South Canara with Cannanore. It took four years to complete.
- 1950 February 11 – Twenty two CPI workers predominantly from Malabar District killed in police firing at Salem Central Prison.
- 1950 February 28 - CPI workers attacked police station at Edappally and killed two policemen on duty.
- 1950 May 14 - All India Radio commences broadcasting from Kozhikode.
- 1950 May - Arson by unidentifiable miscreants at Sabarimala Temple severely damaging the idol.
- 1953 May 11 – INS Garuda, the naval airport in Cochin commissioned.
- 1953 November 11 - Shanmugha Rajeswara Sethupathi inaugurated Kuttippuram bridge until then Calicut was connected with Cochin only through Shoranur.
- 1954 July – Mahé liberated from France as result of liberation struggle led by I. K. Kumaran.
- 1954 August 11 – Four killed in Kanyakumari due to police firing following violence by Travancore Tamil Nadu Congress.
- 1954 December 5 – Thottappally Spillway completes construction in three years and commissioned to reduce salt water intrusion and flooding in Kuttanad.
- 1954 - P. T. Bhaskara Panicker won the elections to Malabar District Board.
- 1955 October 9 - K. Kamaraj inaugurates the Malampuzha Dam.
- 1956 March 2 - Maaru Marakkal Samaram by women at Manimalarkavu Temple, Velur.

==== After formation of Unified Kerala ====
- 1956 November 1 – The state of Kerala formed on linguistic basis through States Reorganisation Act, 1956.
- 1957 March 7 - Kerala State Electricity Board formed.
- 1957 April 6 – E. M. S. Namboodiripad gets elected as first Chief Minister of Kerala and First Namboodiripad ministry became the orld's first Communist government elected through Ballot.
- 1958–59 – Liberation Struggle
- 1959 June 13 – Angamaly police firing
- 1959 July 31 – First Namboodiripad ministry gets dismissed and President Rule came into effect.
- 1961 September 1 - Regional Engineering College (NIT Calicut) established.
- 1963 November 21 – The first Rocket launch of Indian Space Program happens at Thumba Equatorial Rocket Launching Station.
- 1964 September 8 – Sankar ministry loses in motion of no confidence moved by P. K. Kunju.
- 1965 March 15 - Kerala State Road Transport Corporation formed.
- 1966 September 23 - Indira Gandhi inaugurated Cochin Refineries.
- 1967 November 20 – The first indigenously developed rocket Rohini RH 75 launched from Thumba.
- 1968 - Kerala State Water Transport Department established.
- 1970 January 1 – Land reform act in Kerala comes into effect.
- 1970 January 21 - CPI(M) workers torch a KSRTC bus killing four passengers at Chavassery.
- 1971 December 28 – The first Communal riot in state took place at Thalassery.
- 1970 - P. K. Chathan Master forms Kerala Pulaya Mahasabha (KPMS) by combining Pulaya organisation in Travancore and Cochin.
- 1973 April 24 – Kesavananda Bharati v. State of Kerala becomes the landmark judgement that defines amendability of Constitution of India.
- 1973 – Save Silent Valley movement by Kerala Sasthra Sahithya Parishad.
- 1974 – Completion of Thanneermukkom Bund.
- 1976 February 12 – Indira Gandhi commissions Idukki Dam.
- 1976 March – Rajan case
- 1976 September 1 – Kerala Joint Hindu Family System (Abolition) Act of 1975 comes into effect abolishing Marumakkathayam.
- 1979 October 2 - Thiruvananthapuram railway division established.
- 1982 September 1 – Vypin alcohol poisonings
- 1983 - Thirty six Mugger crocodile introduced to Neyyar Dam.
- 1984 April 1 - Kerala Water Authority established.
- 1986 February 24 - Syrian Christian women gets equal property rights following the Mary Roy vs State of Kerala case.
- 1988 July 8 – Peruman railway accident
- 1994 November 25 – Koothuparamba firing
- 1996 - Indian Institute of Management Kozhikode established.

=== 21st century ===
- 2001 June 21 - Kadalundi train derailment
- 2001 - Permanent ban on Endosulfan following Endosulfan tragedy in Kerala
- 2003 February 19 – Muthanga incident
- 2015 August 3 - IIT Palakkad started functioning.
- 2018 May 2 – The first Nipah virus outbreak in Kerala at Perambra.
- 2018 August – 2018 Kerala floods
- 2018 September 28 – A bench headed by Dipak Misra in Supreme Court of India allowed Entry of women to Sabarimala.

== See also ==
- History of Kerala
- List of years in Kerala
- Timeline of Indian history
