= List of Mar Thoma Syrian Christians =

This is a list of Mar Thoma Syrian Christians

== Evangelists and saintly persons ==
- Abraham Malpan, pioneering cleric of the Malankara Syrian Church
- Iype Thoma Kathanar, pioneer cleric, & father of rationalist Abraham Kovoor
- Sadhu Kochoonju Upadesi, preacher, poet and composer
- Philipose Mar Chrysostom, prelate and the emeritus Metropolitan of the Malankara Mar Thoma Syrian Church
- Easow Mar Timotheos Episcopa, episcopa (bishop) of the Mar Thoma Syrian Church
- Anchal Achan, saint of Anchal
- Abraham Mar Thoma, head of the Malankara Mar Thoma Syrian Church from 1944 to 1949
- Juhanon Mar Thoma, head of the Malankara Mar Thoma Syrian Church from 1949 to 1976
- Alexander Mar Thoma, head of the Malankara Mar Thoma Syrian Church
- Joseph Mar Thoma, XXIst Marthoma Metropolitan

== Politics ==
- P. J. Kurien - former Deputy Chairman Rajya Sabha
- Mathew T. Thomas - MLA (Tiruvalla)

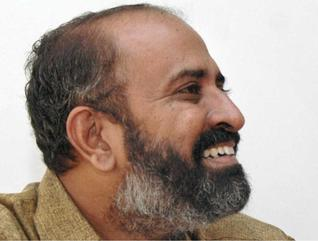
Mathew Thomas

- Thomas Chandy - MLA (Kuttanad), former Minister for Public Transport (Kerala Government)

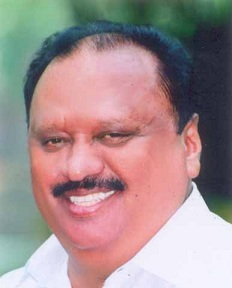
Thomas Chandy

- Madathilparampil Mammen Thomas - Governor of the Nagaland (from May 1990 to April 1992)
- T. M. Varghese - freedom fighter and statesman
- Thampan Thomas - MP of 8th Lok Sabha, Mavelikara Constituency
- Rosamma Punnoose - First Pre-term Speaker of the Kerala Assembly
- Titusji - the only Christian in a group of 78 marchers selected by Mahatma Gandhi to take part in the 1930 Dandi March, to break the salt law.
- George Joseph - Indian independence activist

== Literature ==
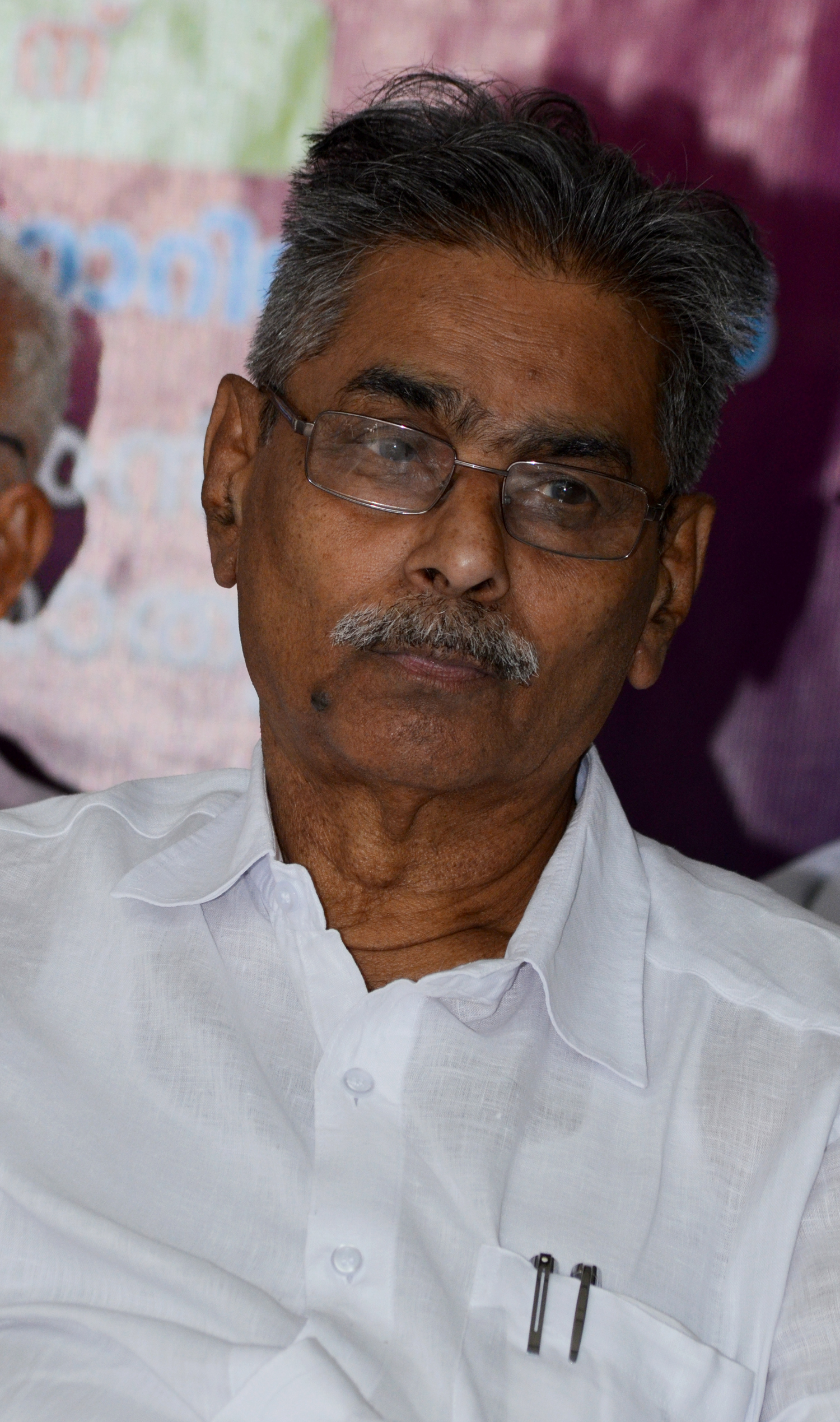
M. Thomas Mathew

- Kakkanadan, short story writer and novelist in the Malayalam language
- K. M. Tharakan, critic, novelist, litterateur and educationalist
- Meena Alexander, poet, scholar, and writer
- Anna Sujatha Mathai, poet
- Sarah Thomas, Malayalam language writer
- Kuzhivelil Mathew, biblical scholar

== Arts and media ==
- John Abraham (director) - Malayalam Director
- Blessy - Film Director
- John Abraham (actor) - Actor (Bollywood)
- Meera Jasmine - National Award Winning Actress
- Joy Mathew - Actor
- Mathew Thomas - Actor
- Kailash, Film actor
- Sandra Thomas - Film producer and actress
- John Matthew Matthan - Director of Bollywood movie, Sarfarosh
- Deepa Mariam - Singer

== Science, humanities, sports, and public service ==
- K. T. Thomas (Justice) - Justice of the Supreme Court of India (1996–2002)

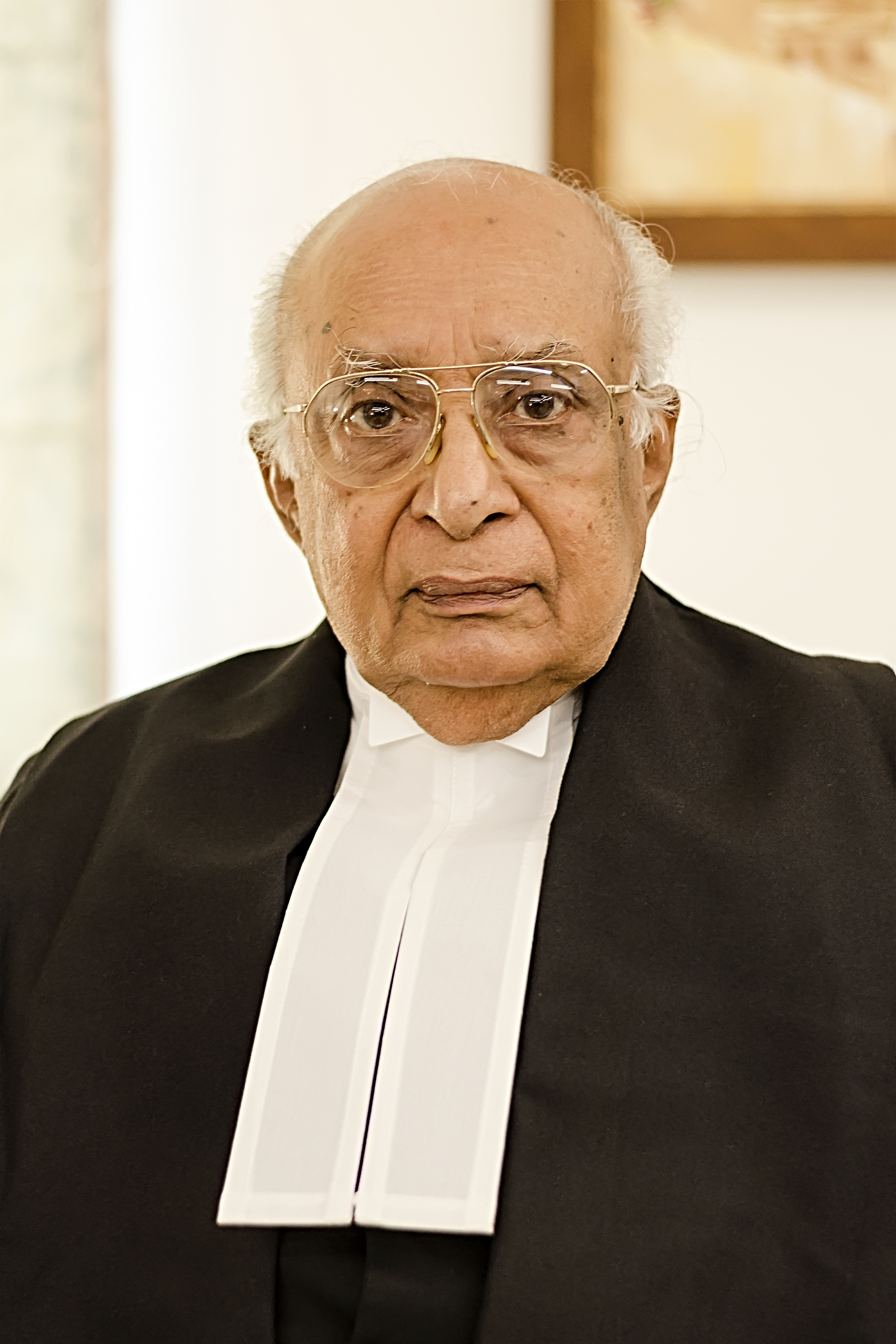
Justice K. T. Thomas

- T. K. Oommen - Economist
- Sunnykutty Abraham - Journalist
- Sunny Varkey - Entrepreneur
- Perakath Verghese Benjamin - Indian physician and medical writer, Padma awardee, expert in tuberculosis treatment in India
- M. O. Mathai - Private Secretary to India's first Prime Minister, Jawaharlal Nehru, popularly called as 'MAC' in political circles of that period
- George Joseph - Scientist
- Thomas Philipose - Only Mahavir Chakra holder from Kerala.

== Marthoma Syrians by birth but stalwarts in other denominations ==
- P. C. John - Evangelist Kerala Brethren Church
- Poykayil Johannan - was a Dalit activist, poet and founder of Prathyaksha Raksha Daiva Sabha or PRDS
- Abraham Kovoor - Indian professor and rationalist, Founder of "Yukthi Vadhi Sangam"
- K. V. Simon - Notable Malayalam Christian poet from Kerala and prominent leader of the Kerala Brethren movement.
- K. P. Yohannan - founder and president of Gospel for Asia and Metropolitan Bishop of Believers Church
