= List of people from Pathanamthitta district =

This is a list of notable people from Pathanamthitta District.

== Politicians and political activists ==
- K. Kumar (1893 - 1973) – President of the Travancore Congress Committee/KPCC, AICC working Committee Member Also known as 'Elanthur Gandhi' and 'Travancore Kumar'.
- Pandalam Kerala Varma – poet
- Pandalam Sudhakaran – former Minister
- K. K. Nair – founder of Pathanamthitta district and MLA representing the district 34 years
- Adoor Prakash – Attingal Member of Parliament and Ex Revenue Minister
- Mathew T. Thomas – former Transport Minister
- Veena George – Kerala state Health Minister (15th legislative assembly, Kerala)

== Judiciary ==
- Justice (retired) M. Fathima Beevi – first woman on the Supreme Court of India

== Spiritual leaders ==
- Poykayil Yohannan
- Abraham Mar Thoma, MarthomaXVII and Marthoma Metropolitan,
- Juhanonon Mar Thoma, MarthomaXVIII and Marthoma Metropolitan
- Alexanderer Mar Thoma, MarthomaXIX and Marthoma Metropolitan,
- Philipose Mar Chrysostom, MarthomaXX and Marthoma Valiya Metropolitan
- Joseph Mar Thoma, MarthomaXX1 and Marthoma Metropolitan
- Baselios Thoma Didymos I, Catholicos of the East and Malankara Metropolitan
- V. C. Samuel, World Council of Churches
- Thomas Mar Athanasius
- Kuriakose Mar Clemis
- Nitya Chaitanya Yati
- Yuhanon Mor Militos
- Sadhu Kochu Kunju Upadesi
- Baselios Cleemis
- Sabu Koshy Cherian

== Writers ==
- Sugathakumari - Indian poet and activist
- Mahakavi Pandalam Kerala Varma – poet, Daivame kaithozham kaakkumarakenam – is written by Keralavarma
- Kadammanitta Ramakrishnan
- K. V. Simon - poet
- Benyamin (writer) – Kerala Sahitya Akademi award winner
- Muloor S. Padmanabha Panicker
- Vennikulam Gopalakurup (1902–1980) – poet
- P. K. Gopi – poet

== Artists, painters and cartoonists ==
- V. S. Valiathan – Classical Painter and Winner of Raja Ravi Varma Puraskaram.
- P. K. Manthri – Political Cartoonist and Creator of Cartoon characters Pachuvum Gopalanum
- C. K. Ra –Painter
- Dr. Jitheshji - World's Fastest Cartoonist and Initiator of the art genre Varayarangu

== Film and stage ==
- Mohanlal – actor
- Thilakan – actor
- Adoor Gopalakrishnan – film director
- K. G. George – film director
- B. Unnikrishnan – film director
- Blessy – film director
- Captain Raju – actor, director, producer
- Aju Varghese – actor
- Kailash (actor) – actor
- Dr. Rajiv Pillai – actor
- Sidhartha Siva – actor, director
- Kaviyoor Sivaprasad – director, screenwriter
- G. Suresh Kumar - producer, actor
- Adoor Bhasi – actor
- M.G. Soman – actor
- Prathapachandran – actor
- Nayanthara – actress
- Meera Jasmine – actress
- Parvathy Jayaram – actress
- Samyuktha Varma – actress
- Mythili – actress
- Urmila Unni – actress
- Utthara Unni – actress
- Kaveri – actress
- Kaviyoor Ponnamma – actress
- Aranmula Ponnamma – actress
- Adoor Bhavani – actress
- Adoor Pankajam – actress
- Alexander Prasanth - actor
- Ayiroor Sadasivan - Playback singer
- Abhirami Ajai - playback singer
- Siju Sunny - actor, writer

=== Kathakali, Padayani and other performing artists ===
- Kadammanitta Vasudevan Pillai – Padayani Exponent
- C. J. Kuttappan – former Chairman of Folklore Academy
- Vishnu Govind - sound effect

== Journalists ==
- T. J. S. George – senior journalist and Kerala Sahitya Akademi Award Winner
- George Varghese – director of Prasar Bharati
- Elanthoor Kumarji (1893 - 1973) – veteran freedom activist

== Others ==
- M. George Muthoot
- George Alexander Muthoot
