= John Joseph Murphy Memorial Higher Secondary School =

Location
- Kerala; India; 9.6177°N 76.8878°E

John Joseph Murphy Memorial Higher Secondary School is a secondary school located in Yendayar, Kerala, India. It is managed as part of the Kanjirappalli educational district, and has the centre code 32011. The school was opened in 1982 by Michael A. Kallivayalil with the support of local people. The school was established in the name of J. J. Murphy (1872 – 1957), one of the most successful Irish rubber planters in India.

The school is in Yendayar, near the eastern border of Kottayam District, 65 km from Kottayam, and around 11 km away from Mundakayam on the NH 220 (Kottayam-Kumily Road). All buses to Elamkadu pass through Yendayar. Mundakayam, Koottickal and Elamkadu are the nearest towns. The nearest railway station is Kottayam and the nearest airport is Nedumbassery.

According to local tradition, Murphy named the place that was to be his home till death in 1957, after his mother and the local river. Yendayar is a combination of "yen" (my), "thai" (mother) and "ar" (river). The place was a thick forest and had no name or people; there he established India's first successful rubber plantation.

The Higher Secondary Section of the school was started in the year 1998.

The school has performed consistently well in athletics. In April 2007, during the 51st Kerala School Games at the Nehru Stadium, student M.M. Anchu won the senior girls’ 100m hurdles.
