= Palluruthy (disambiguation) =

Palluruthy is a region in India. Palluruthy may also refer to:

- Pradeep Palluruthy Malayalam singer
- Palluruthy Relief Settlement
