= Marthoma Syrian Churches in the United States =

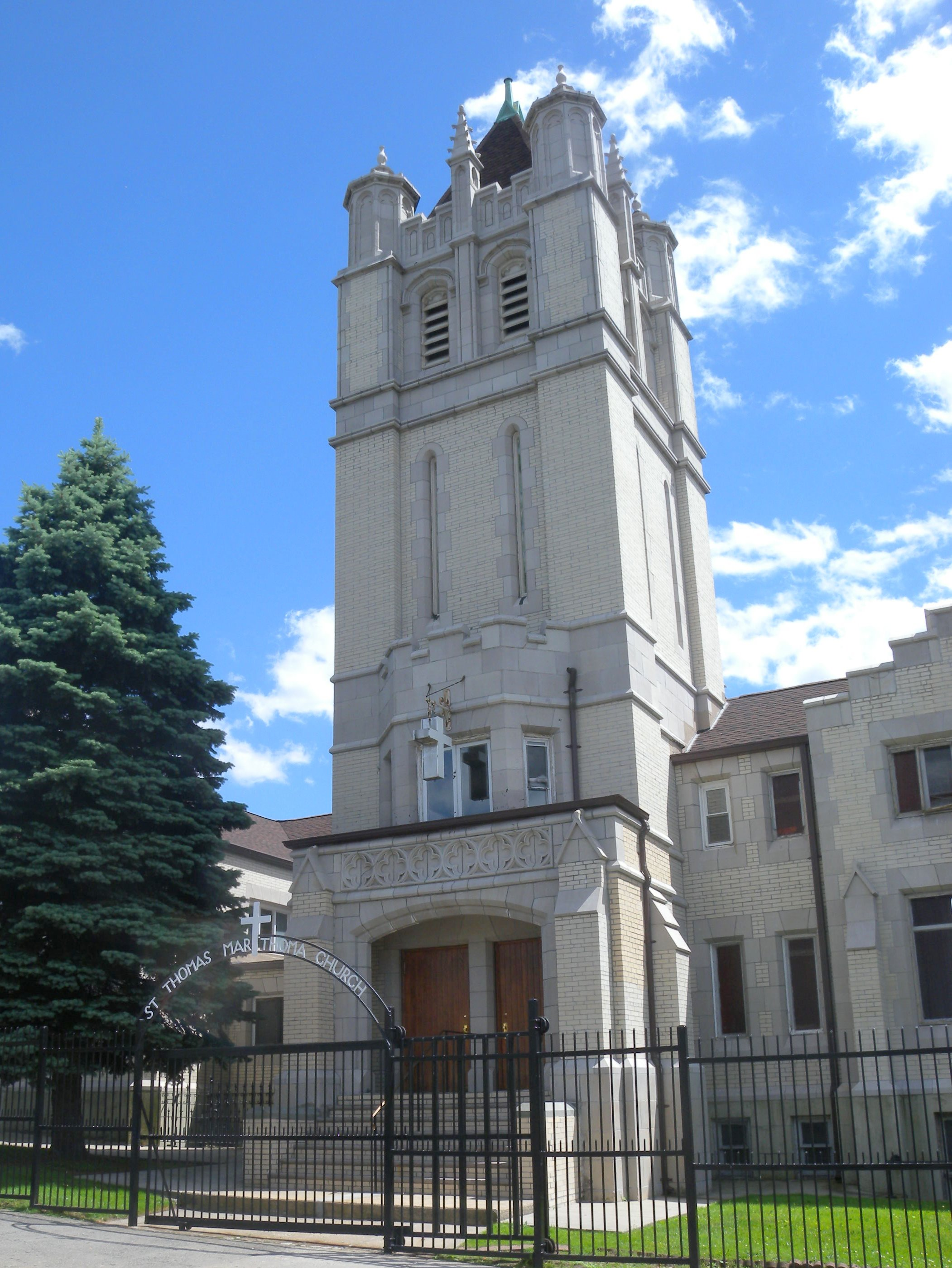
St Thomas Marthoma Church, Ludlow, Yonkers

Here is the list of Marthoma Syrian Churches in United States of America:

1. St Thomas Marthoma Church, Ludlow, Yonkers, New York
2. St. Stephen's Mar Thoma Church, East Brunswick, New Jersey
3. Mar Thoma Church, Philadelphia, Fort Washington, Pennsylvania
4. Christos Mar Thomas Church, Philadelphia, Pennsylvania
5. Detroit Mar Thoma Church, Southfield, Michigan
6. Chicago Mar Thoma Church, Des Plaines, Chicago, Illinois
7. St. Thomas Mar Thoma Church, Chicago, Lombard, Chicago, Illinois
8. Immanuel Mar Thoma Church, Virginia, Virginia
9. Mar Thoma Church of Dallas, Farmers Branch, Dallas, Texas
10. Sehion Mar Thoma Church of Dallas, Plano, Dallas, Texas
11. Trinity Mar Thoma Church Houston, Houston, Texas
12. St. Mark's Mar Thoma Church, Tampa, Tampa, Florida
13. Mar Thoma Church of San Francisco, San Francisco, California
14. Mar Thoma Church of Greater Seattle, Kent, Washington
15. Mar Thoma Congregation of San Antonio, San Antonio, Texas
