= Mar Thoma Syrian Church Diocese of North America & Europe =

Malankara Mar Thoma Syrian Church. Diocese of North America & Europe.
- Classification: Oriental Protestant
- Theology: Reformed
- Primate: Theodosius Mar Thoma Metropolitan
- Language: Malayalam, English, Syriac
- Headquarters: 2320 South Merrick Avenue, Merrick, New York.
- Territory: North America, South America and Europe
- Founder: Saint Thomas the Apostle
- Official website: www.marthomanae.org

The Diocese of North America & Europe is a diocese of the Malankara Mar Thoma Syrian Church that includes all the parishes in the North American and European continents. Its headquarters is at Sinai Mar Thoma Centre, Merrick, New York. In 2026, the Diocesan bishop is Rt. Rev. Dr. Abraham Mar Paulos Episcopa, who is in charge of 13 congregations and over 68 parishes in the USA and Canada.

== Mar Thoma Church ==
The Mar Thoma Church defines itself as "apostolic in origin, catholic in nature, biblical in faith, evangelical in principle, ecumenical in outlook, oriental in worship, democratic in function, episcopal in character, and is a theologically Reformed church.

=== Beginning of parishes in England ===
Members of the Mar Thoma Church began to leave Kerala during the Indian partition in the late 1940s, with some arriving in the UK in the 1950s.

During this period the community was supported by the following clergy - Rev. V V Alexander; Rt Rev. Joseph Mar Thoma; Very Rev. P M George; Rt Rev. Easow Mar Timotheus and Rev. Dr Philip Varghese. Rev. Dr Abrham Philip, the first vicar was appointed in 1982.

=== Early history of the Diocese ===
Members of the Mar Thoma Church began to arrive in the USA in the 1970s.

The first prayer group was established in Queens, New York, in 1972, and the first approved parish was recognised in New York in 1976; the new Diocese Zone was established in 1982. At that time The Rt. Rev. Dr. Thomas Mar Athanasius and The Most Rev. Dr. Alexander Mar Thoma supervised the Zone.

Philipose Mar Chrysostom took charge as diocesan bishop in 1988.

The Zone became an official Diocese in 1994.

=== Mar Thoma Centre ===
In the 1990s the Diocesan Assembly decided to permanently house the Diocese. In 1994 the Assembly initially purchased property at Richboro, Pennsylvania, for their headquarters, but subsequently moved to their current location at 2320 South Merrick Avenue, Merrick, New York. In October 2018, the Diocese of North America and Europe purchased the Mount Carmel Christian Church in Tucker, Georgia which hosts the Mission activities of the Diocese. The name "Carmel Mar Thoma Center" was given at the current location at 6015 Old Stone Mountain Road, Stone Mountain, Georgia.

=== Diocesan bishops ===
1. The Late Rt. Rev. Dr. Zacharias Mar Theophilus (October 1993 – October 2001)
2. Rt. Rev. Dr. Euyakim Mar Coorilos (October 2001 – December 2008)
3. Rt. Rev. Dr. Geevarghese Mar Theodosius Episcopa (January 2009 – March 2016)
4. The Rt. Rev. Dr. Isaac Mar Philoxenos Episcopa.(April 2016 – December 2023)
5. Rt. Rev. Dr. Abraham Mar Paulos Episcopa (incumbent from January 2024 - )

== See also ==
- Marthoma Syrian Churches in the United States
