= John Joseph Murphy (rubber planter) =

Irish agricultural entrepreneur

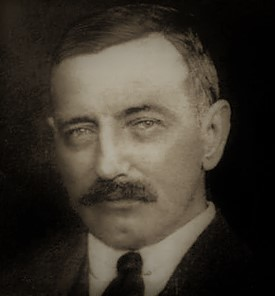
- John Joseph Murphy (J.J. Murphy)
- Born: August 1, 1872; Ireland
- Died: May 9, 1957 (aged 84); Yendayar, Kerala, India
- Occupations: Planter, Philanthropist
- Known for: Pioneering commercial rubber cultivation in India
- Awards: Pro Ecclesia et Pontifice (Papal honor)

John Joseph Murphy (1 August 1872 – 9 May 1957) was an Irish agricultural entrepreneur who established India's first commercially viable rubber plantation in Kerala in 1902. He is considered to be the Father of Indian Rubber Plantation. In recognition of his philanthropic work in Yendayar—including donating land and resources to establish the Holy Family Convent and supporting education and local welfare initiatives, Murphy was awarded the Papal honor of Pro Ecclesia et Pontifice. These contributions to the local community resulted in the John Joseph Murphy Memorial Higher Secondary School, established in his memory in Yendayar.

== Early life and education ==
John Joseph Murphy was born in Ireland on 1 August 1872. As a child, he suffered from asthma and was educated at home by the Marist Brothers. His education continued at Trinity College in Dublin which he did not complete.

== Career and rubber plantation ==
Murphy interrupted his education to join a tea plantation company in Ceylon (now Sri Lanka). In 1897 Murphy joined Messrs Finlay Muir & Co for developing tea in the Kannan Devan Hills.

Murphy arrived in Yendayar, a remote forested area in Kerala, and began experimenting with rubber cultivation. The area's hilly terrain and climate were ideal but the concept of rubber planting was new to the region. His work helped transform Kerala's agricultural landscape and economy, making rubber a major cash crop.

Murphy served in the executive committee of the United Planters' Association of Southern India for long and was the driving force behind the formation of the Rubber Scientific Department in UPASI that established the Mycology centre in 1924 at Mundakayam.

== Philanthropy ==
Murphy was known for his philanthropy towards the local community. He also supported education initiatives, healthcare, and welfare projects for plantation workers and their families.

== Recognition ==
For his community service and contributions to the Catholic Church, Murphy was awarded the Papal honor Pro Ecclesia et Pontifice.

The John Joseph Murphy Memorial Higher Secondary School, located in Yendayar, was named in his honor to continue his legacy in education.

A commemorative plaque recognizing Murphy, McPherson and Raman Kankani's contributions is installed at the nearby Nature Sanctuary Urumbi Hills, a colonial bungalow frequented by the group, currently functioning as a hotel.

The J.J. Murphy Research Centre (JJMRC), dedicated to rubber research, houses a bust commemorating Murphy's pioneering role.

== Other accomplishments ==
According to documented records published in the India Rubber Journal and by the Rubber Board, Thattekad near Kothamangalam is regarded as the birthplace of the commercial rubber plantation industry in India.

The first commercial rubber estate in India was established in 1902 at Thattekad by the Periyar Syndicate, led by Joseph J. Murphy along with J. A. Hunter, H. E. Nicoll, and C. M. F. Ross. The plantation was situated in the foothills of the Western Ghats in the erstwhile princely state of Travancore, presently part of the Ernakulam district in Kerala.

The estate was located near the historic Alwaye–Munnar road, which was frequently used during the British colonial period. Between 1902 and 1907, approximately 500 hectares of land were planted with rubber trees in the Thattekad Estate, extending for nearly 15 kilometres along the banks of the Periyar River.

Joseph J. Murphy initially believed that rubber trees would grow best near riverbanks, influenced by observations of rubber cultivation near the Amazon River in Brazil. He later concluded that the crop could also be successfully cultivated in hilly terrain. In 1905, ownership of the estate was transferred to the Periyar Rubber Company Ltd., following which Murphy relocated to Mundakkayam.

The plantation estate and the bungalow constructed there in 1902 are presently owned and managed by the Kottukapally family. The colonial-era bungalow has since been renovated, and efforts have been undertaken to preserve its historical legacy for future generations.

== Legacy ==
Murphy's pioneering efforts made a lasting impact on India's rubber industry and rural development.

His grave is visited yearly by the local parish, honoring his memory and contributions to the community.
