= Immanuel Mar Thoma Church, Virginia =

Parish in Aldie, Virginia

Coordinates: 38.9171°N 77.5562°W

Immanuel Mar Thoma Church, Virginia is the first parish in the U.S. state of Virginia, under Diocese of North America and Europe of Mar Thoma Syrian Church of Malabar in India. Immanuel Mar Thoma Church, VA currently conducts its Holy Communion Service at Aldie, Virginia. The Parish is currently led by Vicar Rev. Shiju Robert.

== Malankara Mar Thoma Syrian Church ==
Malankara Mar Thoma Syrian Church (Malankara Mar Thoma Suriyani Sabha as it is called in native Malayalam) is one of the oldest groups of praticising Christians in the world. In the traditional accounts of the Saint Thomas Christians of India, it is believed that Saint Thomas (also called Didimus or Thomas, the doubter) came to Muziris on the south west coast of India in AD 52 and laid the foundations of Christianity in this part of the world.

== Mar Thoma Church in the United States ==
The history of the Mar Thoma Church in the North American and European continents represents the dreams and aspirations of the faithful members of the Church. Commencing as a small prayer group in Queens, New York, in 1972, the first approved parish was recognized in New York in 1976. From this humble beginning, the Mar Thoma Church began to immeasurably grow within the last 30 years. In terms of functionality, the churches in this part of the world were grouped as a Zone of the Mar Thoma Church in 1982.

== Immanuel Mar Thoma Church, Virginia, formation ==
Immanuel Mar Thoma Church, Virginia, was approved as a new parish of the Mar Thoma Syrian Church of Malabar, effective April 15, 2010, by the Synod of the Mar Thoma church which met on February 22, 2010. Rev M.M John was appointed by the Most Rev. Dr. Joseph Mar Thoma Metropolitan as the first vicar of the parish which is under the Diocese of North America & Europe.

Since the early 1990s a dedicated group of Mar Thoma families have lived and worshiped in the Commonwealth of Virginia. These families longed for a place of worship closer to home and a place of Christian learning offered by Sunday school for their children. The information technology boom of the late 1990s brought a new wave of Mar Thoma families to Northern Virginia which was rapidly emerging as the Silicon Valley of the East. These families brought with them a desire for worship and fellowship with like-minded believers. The foundations for a future parish was laid over the years by these families as they participated actively in church organizations at the Mar Thoma Church of Greater Washington which as the parent church offered prayerful support to the infant parish.

== Parish inauguration ==
On December 26, 2010, Diocesan Bishop Rt. Rev. Dr. Geevarghese Mar Theodosius Episcopa formally inaugurated Immanuel Mar Thoma Church, Virginia.

== Vicar ==
Rev. Shiju Robert is the vicar of Immanuel Mar Thoma Church, Virginia, since May 1, 2024.

== Former vicars ==
- Rev M. M. John served as vicar from April 2010 to December 2010.
- Rev. Dr. Philip Varghese served as vicar from January 2011 to April 2011.
- Rev. Roy Geevarghese served as vicar from May 2011 to April 2012.
- Rev. Jaisen Thomas served as vicar from May 2012 to April 2016.
- Rev. Alex Kolath served as vicar from May 2017 to September 2020.
- Rev. Prince Varughese served as interim vicar from September 2020 to April 2021.
- Rev. Renny Varghese served as vicar from May 2021 to April 2024.

== Church organizations ==
The parish organizations or ministries are:

- Edavaka Mission (Parish Mission)
- Sunday School
- Choir
- Youth Fellowship
- Yuvajanasakhyam
- Sevika Sanghom (Women's Ministry)
- Young Family Fellowship
- Senior Citizens Fellowship

== Church parsonage ==
The church purchased a new property as parsonage on May 4, 2012, at Chantilly, Virginia. The vicar and his family stay at the parsonage.

== Fundraising project in 2014 ==
The church conducted a raffle fundraiser in 2014.

== Church land in Aldie for constructing a church building ==
The church purchased a land in Aldie, Virginia, on February 15, 2017, to construct a church building.

== New Church Building ==
In August 2022, Immanuel Mar Thoma Church in Virginia embarked on a significant journey—the construction of its cherished Church building. The cornerstone was solemnly laid by the esteemed Diocesan Episcopal Rt. Rev. Dr. Isaac Mar Philoxenos Episcopa, in the esteemed presence of Vicar Rev. Renny Varghese and the devoted congregation.

March 30, 2024, marked a momentous occasion as the new Church building was officially dedicated by the revered Diocesan Bishop Rt. Rev. Dr. Abraham Mar Paulose. This milestone stands as a testament to the unwavering faith and dedication of the community. During this occasion, the Church released a souvenir magazine.

In heartfelt gratitude, the congregation fondly recalls the tireless efforts of Vicar Rev. Renny Varghese and the prayerful guidance of former vicars throughout the process. They also extend their sincerest appreciation to all the generous members and well-wishers who contributed their time and resources to make this dream a reality.
