= Varayarangu =

Infotainment art genre in Kerala

Varayarangu is an experimental Infotainment art genre from Kerala, which explores the performing level possibilities of Fine Art as a Stage Art . This 'Cartoon Stage Show' is a blend of poetry, anecdotes and socio-political satire with high speed drawing. World's Fastest Performing Cartoonist Jitheshji has initiated and developed this art genre. The mode of presentation of this one-hour 'Cartoon Stage Show' is very captivating and enchanting by means of interlacing interesting anecdotes, light talk and social satire while drawing hundreds of celebrity caricatures on stage with a lightning pace and satirical commentary in order to create a new sensibility. Now, this art genre is onto 2000 stages since its launching on 22 June 2008, at Artist V. S. Valliathan's second death Anniversary Commemorative Meeting conducted at Pandalam in Pathanamthitta District, Kerala State.
