= Dutch conquest of Malabar =

1658–1663 victory over Portugal in India

Conquest of Malabar (1658–1663)
- Part of Dutch–Portuguese War
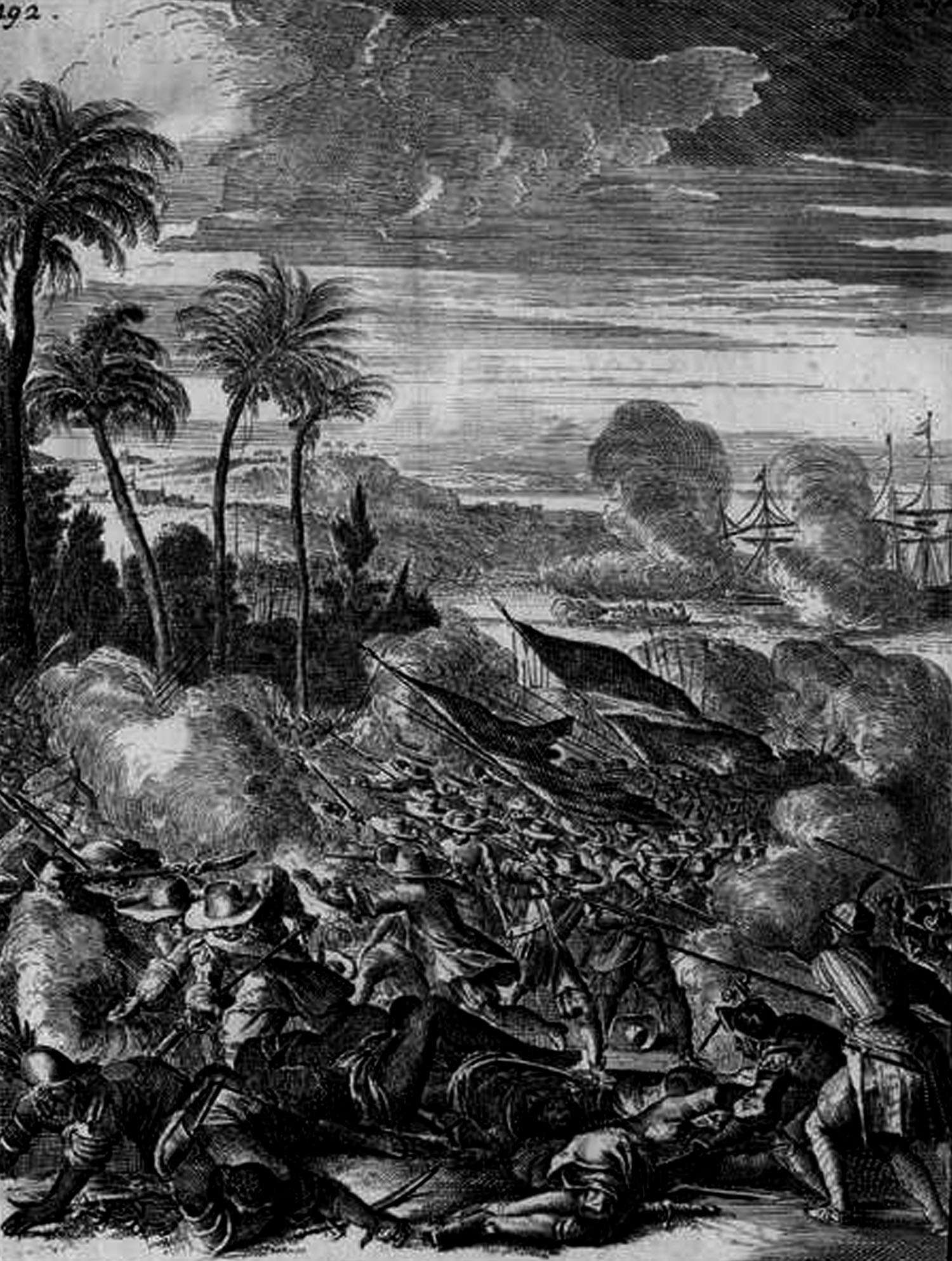
- Unknown battle between the Dutch and Portuguese during the campaign.
Date	1658–1663
Location	Malabar Coast, India
Result	Dutch victory
Territorial changes	Establishment of Dutch Malabar

Belligerents
Portugal; Cochin	Dutch Republic; Calicut

Commanders and leaders
	Rijckloff van Goens Adriaan van der Meyden

Strength
3,300–3,500 Portuguese Soldiers; 4,000–5,000 Nairs	29 ships 4,000 men

Casualties and losses
Unknown	Unknown

The Conquest of Malabar (1658–1663) encompassed a series of military campaigns led by Rijckloff van Goens with the objective of acquiring Portuguese-controlled territories along the Malabar Coast. The Dutch pursued these campaigns with determination, ultimately achieving success in their endeavor. As a result, the Dutch secured control over various regions along the Malabar Coast, marking a significant shift in the regional geopolitical landscape

== Background ==
On September 5, 1657, Rijckloff van Goens embarked from Batavia on a voyage aimed at challenging the Portuguese presence in the Indian subcontinent. His journey initially brought him to Ceylon, where his primary objective was to dislodge the Portuguese from their positions on the island. He fleet departed from Batavia on September 6, 1657. By January 10, 1658, a fleet comprising 9 ships, 2 sloops, and 8 large dhonies for transporting ammunition and supplies had been assembled in Colombo, along with a force of approximately 1,500 men. On February 1, the fleet advanced to Tuticorin, successfully capturing the location. On February 20, they reached the island of Manar and secured the fortress there, which held 181 defenders and was captured on February 22. In March 1, Rijckloff van Goens crossed over and led a march to Jaffna. On April 27, the fort of "Cais," located on a small island near Jaffna, was captured. Subsequently, van Goens initiated a siege on the main castle in Jaffna. Because of the Dutch blockade of Goa, no assistance came from there, and the Jaffna castle succumbed on June 22. The surrender followed significant casualties, with over 1,600 individuals within the castle having perished. Negapatam was successfully taken on August 1. Afterward, van Goens sailed to Pulicat, a key Dutch base on the Coromandel Coast. He then made a return voyage via Jaffna and Manar before arriving in Colombo on November 3. During his return, he observed favorable conditions in Colombo when he returned.

== Conquest ==
Rijckloff van Goens resumed his Malabar campaign, capturing Quilon from the Portuguese on December 29.

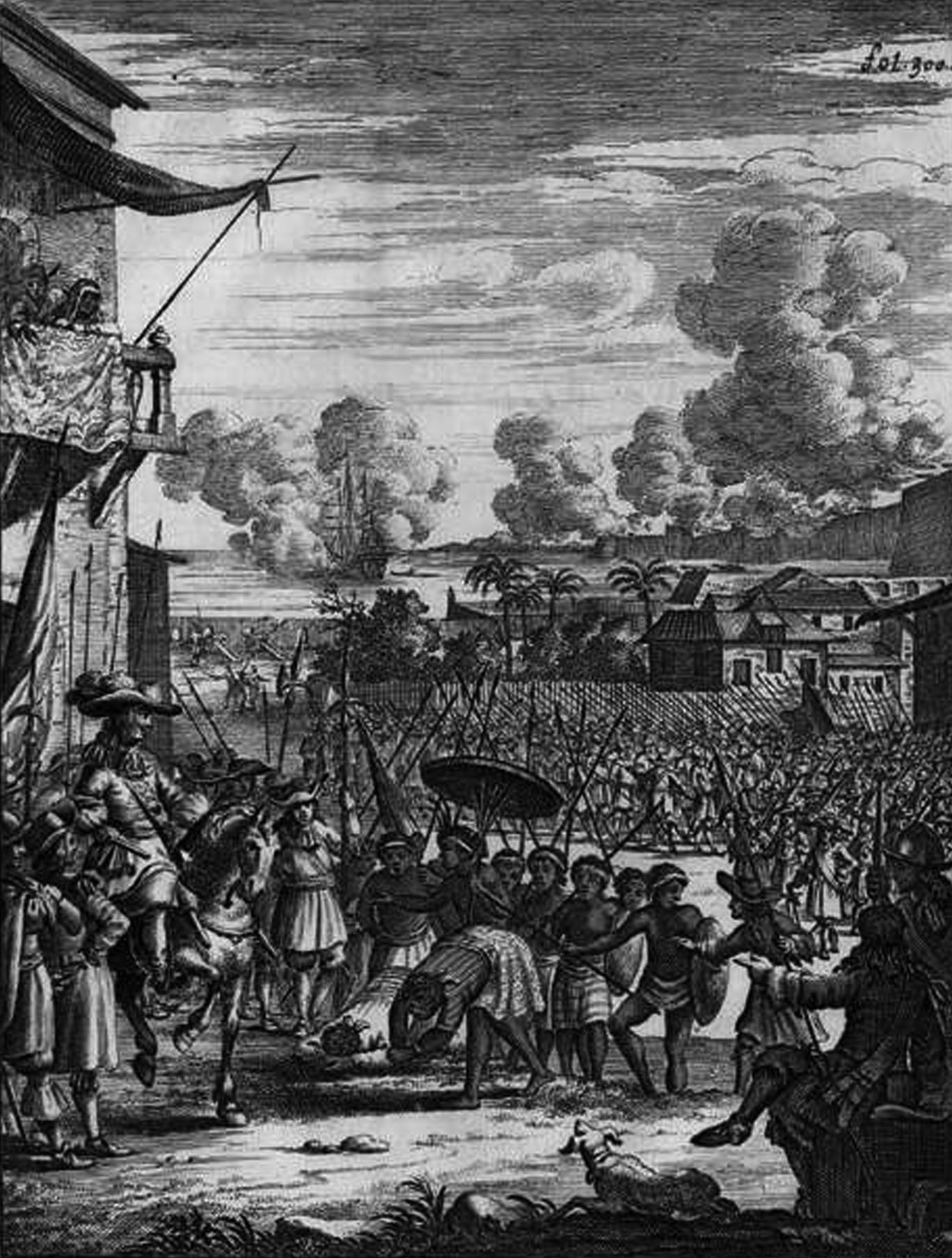
Quilon surrenders to the Dutch

After moving to Cannanore, he was instructed to send 500 men back to Batavia and temporarily cease operations. Returning to Ceylon, he left a significant garrison in Quilon. However, the garrison faced a siege from around "3,000 Portuguese and numerous Nairs." Governor Van der Meyden of Ceylon intervened, withdrawing the garrison on April 14, 1659.

By June 27, 1661, the Batavia Council decided to assemble another fleet to attack Portuguese positions along India's coast and control the Goa bar, thwarting their support to Ceylon or Europe. On January 25, 1660, van Goens sailed again for Malabar. In early 1661, Governor Van der Meyden led a fleet with 1,200 men to join a patrol already near Malabar. By February 10, they reached Ayacotta, a key point on the strip known as the Island of Yypeen. This stretch links Cochin to the Cranganore passage, bridging sea and backwater.

At Ayacotta, near Palliport, Van der Meyden negotiated with the Zamorin of Calicut's heir and the King of Cranganore. They agreed to attack Portuguese forts at Palliport and Cranganore, sharing spoils if successful. Terms included keeping Christian captives, expelling Portuguese priests, demolishing forts, sharing costs, revenue, and administration. Near Palliport, Van der Meyden's troops landed on February 15, 1661, skirmishing with a Nair force and sustaining minor losses. On February 16, they advanced toward Palliport's main fortress, which likely differed from the 1507 castle, possibly constructed around 1600. The Portuguese had around 100-150 Europeans and 100 Nairs. The Dutch brought heavy artillery, constructing defenses.The Dutch positioned two twelve-pound cannons and a mortar, building a defensive structure to the south of the fort for protection against potential forces approaching from Cochin. Simultaneously, the Portuguese fled through the backwater passage, escaping the Dutch sloops before they could intercept them. A group of 300 to 500 Portuguese, accompanied by 4,000 to 5,000 Nairs, had embarked on a journey by land and backwater from Cochin, but their arrival was untimely. The Dutch had already gained control of the fort. A short while later, Van der Meyden gave Palliport to the Zamorin and returned to Colombo.

Both Palliport and Cranganore forts held strategic importance for Cochin. However, the Portuguese had fortified Cochin and Cranganore, making it seem too late to take further action in that season. however the Dutch still subsequently laid siege to Cranganore from January 3 to January 15, and their efforts were met with success. The fleet departed on March 5 and reached Colombo on March 26. Some ships were left at Cayenculam to safeguard the company's factory. Dispatches were sent to Batavia on April 5. Van der Meyden believed it unwise to attack the heavily garrisoned Cochin. In contrast, Van Goens believed it necessary to capture both Cochin and Quilon to strengthen their recent acquisitions and secure the region's pepper and wild cinnamon resources. He emphasized that the plan for Cochin should be remembered, regardless of any potential peace treaty with Portugal.

In the meantime, the initial proposal was to make an attempt on S. Thomé. The Governors of Coromandel and Ceylon agreed that seizing this stronghold from the Portuguese should be a priority before pursuing peace. Van der Meyden envisioned S. Thomé becoming the main base for the Coromandel Coast, while Governor Pit of Coromandel preferred to maintain the headquarters at Pulicat. However, these plans did not materialize. In 1661, the King of Golconda placed S. Thomé under his direct protection. In March 1662, after capturing several forts, Van Goens returned to Batavia to gather additional reinforcements for a decisive expedition. He established garrisons in Cranganur and Quilon, after their capture. Setting out on August 26, 1662, he reached Cranganur on October 24. By October 28, he had commenced the siege of Cochin. They then occupied Papeneieland, an island near Cochin, and Bolghatti Island. Additionally, he removed the pro-Portuguese claimant, Goda Varma, from Anchi Kaimal.

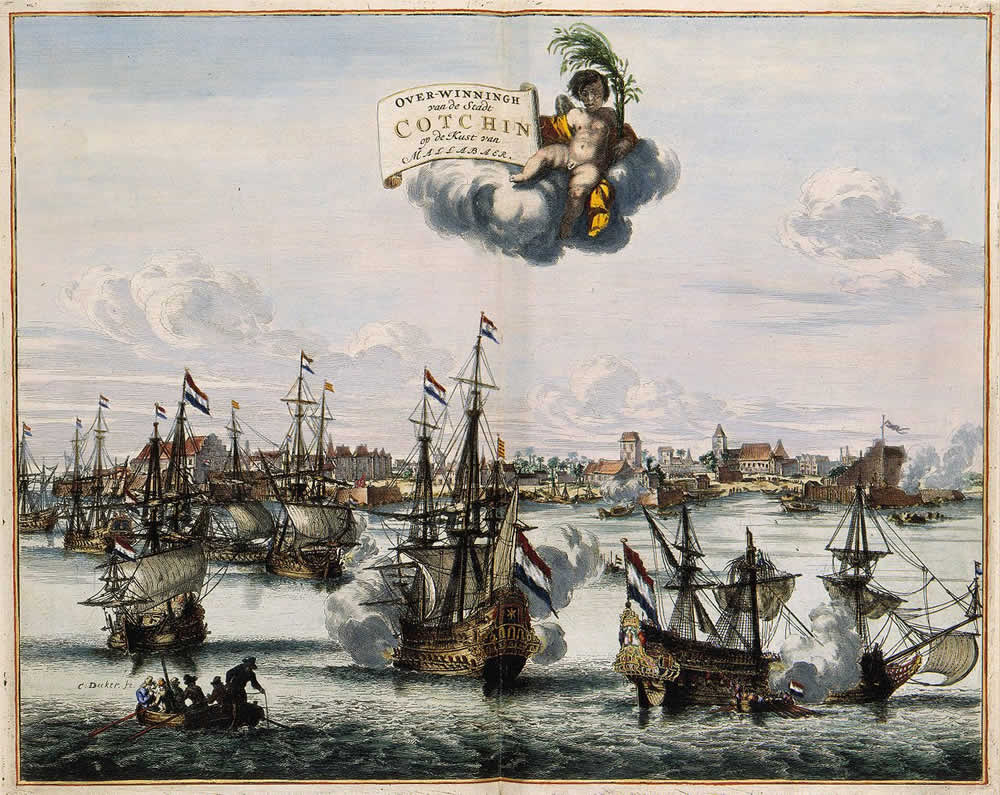
Siege of Cochin

On January 5, 1663, Van Goens made the decision to launch an assault on the fort at Cochin. By January 7, the fort had surrendered. He displaced the Portuguese inhabitants and relocated them elsewhere. However, news reached Van Goens that Cranganur had been retaken by the Portuguese. Responding promptly, he dispatched a well-equipped force to regain control, successfully recapturing it. This marked the definitive expulsion of the Portuguese from the Malabar region.

== Sources ==
- Vink, Markus (2015). Encounters on the Opposite Coast: The Dutch East India Company and the Nayaka State of Madurai in the Seventeenth Century (E-book ed.). Brill. ISBN 9789004272620.
- Galletti, A. (9 September 2021). The Dutch in Malabar Being a Translation of Selections Nos. 1 and 2 (PDF). Creative Media Partners, LLC. ISBN 9781014898524.
