= Militos Yuhanon =

His Grace Mor Militos Yuhanon Metropolitan of Thumpamon and Patriarchal Vicar of Qatar
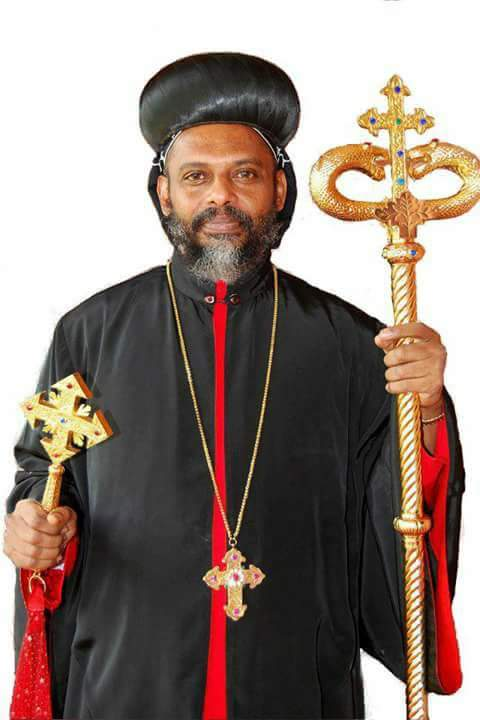
- Church: Jacobite Syrian Orthodox Church
- Diocese: Thumpamon and Patriarchal Vicar of Qatar
- See: Holy Apostolic See of Antioch & All East

Orders
- Ordination: 5 December 1982 (Kassisso) by Mor Baselios Paulose II
- Consecration: 8 December 2002 by Patriarch Ignatius Zakka I
- Rank: Metropolitan

Personal details
- Born: 25 April 1957 Pathanamthitta
- Residence: Elavinamannil family
- Parents: Rev. E.O.Thomas Cor-Episcopus and Thankamma
- Education: M.A History from Kerala University, B.C.S from Serampore University, Theological Studies from Mor Ignatius Dayro Manjinikkara

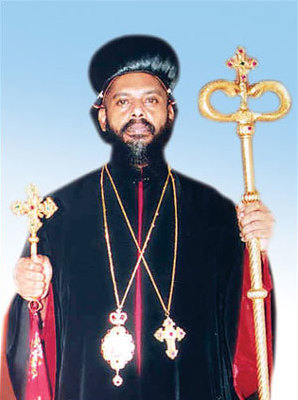
Mor Militheos Yuhanon Elavinamannil

Mor Militos Yuhanon is a Syriac Orthodox bishop in Malankara. He is the Metropolitan of Thumpamon Diocese and Patriarchal Vicar of Qatar.

== Early years ==
Yuhanon was born on 25 April 1957 to Rev.E.O.Thomas Cor-Episcopus and Thankamma in Elavinamannil family, Omallur, Pathanamthitta. St.Stephen's Syriac Orthodox Church, Manjinikkara was his parish.

== Education ==
Yuhanon took his U. G. and P. G. from Kerala University, in History. His basic theological education is from Mor Ignatius Dayro Manjinikkara. Later he joined Serampore University as an external student and obtained Bachelor of Christian Studies (BCS) degree.

== Priesthood ==
On 14 September 1976, at the age of 19, Yuhanon was ordained deacon by Catholicose Mor Baselios Paulose II.

He was ordained Dn. E. T. John, Elavinamannil as Kassiso on 5 December 1982.

In 2000, Moran Mor Ignatius Zakka I Iwas, Prince Patriarch of Antioch and All the East appointed Fr. E. T. John, Elavinamannil as Reesh Dayaro and Managing Trustee of Piramadom Dayaro. Malankara Episcopal Synod selected Fr. E. T. John as the new metropolitan for Kollam and Thumpamon Dioceses. Moran Mor Ignatius Zakka I Iwas ordained him as Ramban and on 8 December 2002, as metropolitan by the name Mor Militos at Patriarchal Cathedral, Damascus.

== Responsibilities ==
1. Metropolitan of Thumpamon Diocese

== See also ==
- Manjanikkara Dayara
- Omallur
- Syriac Orthodox Church
