= S. Jithesh =

Indian speed cartoonist

- Born: 30 December 1974 (age 51); Pandalam Thekkekkara, Pathanamthitta district
- Education: M.A in English Literature, LL.B
- Occupations: Performing cartoonist, poet
- Spouse: Unnymaya
- Children: 2
- Writing career
- Pen name: Super-Speedy Cartoonist
- Genres: Varayarangu, cartoons

S. Jithesh (Sekhar Jithesh), popularly known as Dr. Jitheshji, is an Indian performing speed cartoonist and a former vice-chairman of the Kerala Cartoon Academy. He is considered the father of Speed Cartooning, having initiated and popularised concepts such as Speed Cartooning, Super-Speedy Cartooning, and Raptoon through his infotainment stage shows titled Varayarangu Raptoon Thriller.

His infotainment art form, Varayarangu, combines poetry, anecdotes, and socio-political satire with high-speed drawing. The major attraction of his performances is the rapid sketching of over a thousand celebrity caricatures, accompanied by satirical commentary. He has been recognised as the "World's Fastest Performing Cartoonist" for his ability to sketch fifty celebrity caricatures within five minutes.

Jitheshji is the first Keralite to have received over 20 million views on Instagram for his unique art performances. He was also a celebrity speaker at a TEDx event at KIIT University in Bhubaneswar, Odisha, on 10 August 2024. His birth day falls on 30 December.

Jithesh is known for his memory and has been described as a "super memoriser" for the ability to recall over 100,000 pieces of information from memory. He is referred to as the "History Man of India" for his capacity to recall the historical significance of all 366 days of the year (including leap years) and more than 300 years of world history. His ability to recall information has been noted and recorded.

His name has appeared frequently in public service examination questionnaires. He has performed in more than 20 countries, presenting his infotainment speed cartoon shows and pictorial orations. Over the course of his career, he has conducted more than 10,000 speed cartoon stage shows across India and abroad.

As a performing cartoonist, he is noted for his lightning-speed sketches and pictorial speeches on stage. He has served as the editor-in-chief of Chiricheppu, a monthly cartoon magazine. Jithesh has also published collections of poems in both Malayalam and English.

== Personal life ==
Jithesh was born on 30 December 1974 in Pandalam, Pathanamthitta district, to K. N. Somasekharan Nair and M. Remani Amma. He holds an LL.B degree, an M.A. in English Literature, and a D.Litt. (U.S.). He is married to Unnimaya, and the couple have two children.

== Published works ==
Jithesh has authored several works in Malayalam and English, including poetry and instructional books on cartooning. His notable publications include:

- Nakshathrangale Pranayicha Oraal (Nakṣatraṅṅaḷe praṇayicca orāḷ: kavitakaḷ) – a collection of poems published by Unma Publications in 1999. It is listed in the Library of Congress catalogue (LC Control Number 99952122).

Citation: Jitēṣ, Es. Nakṣatr̲aṅṅaḷe pr̲aṇayicca orāḷ: kavitakaḷ / Es. Jitēṣ. Nūr̲anāṭ: Uṇma Publications, 1999. 50 p.: ill.; 22 cm.

- Kuttikkavitthakalum Cartoon Padanavum – a work combining children's poetry and lessons on cartoon studies.
- Cartoon–Caricature Varakkaan Padikkan – an instructional guide on drawing cartoons and caricatures.

== Other sources ==
1. Kerala Sahitya Akademi's 'Sahityakara Directory'.
2. Samakalika Malayalam Weekly's 2004 October 1- Issue, Page74 (Jeevitham Enne Enthu Padippichu column compiled by T.N.Jayachandran I.A.S
3. Kavikalum Kavitha Charithravum- An Academic Encyclopedia, Published by Haritham Books, Kozhikode.
