= Sunnykutty Abraham =

Indian journalist

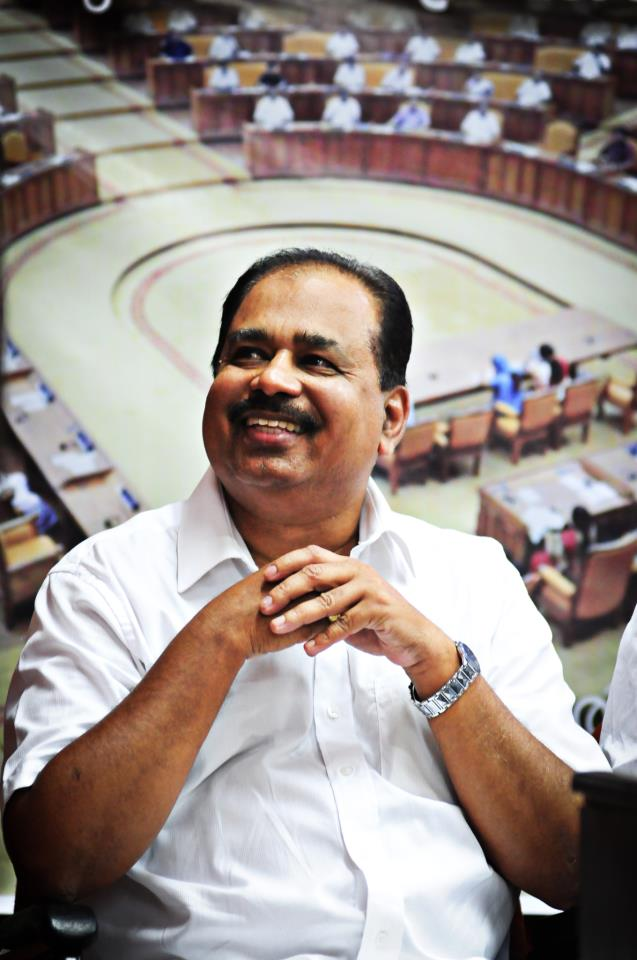
- Sunnykutty Abraham at the release of his book Sabhathalam: Nammude Niyama Nirmana Sabhakal in 2013
- Born: Sunnykutty Abraham; 19 February 1955 (age 70); Ranni, India
- Education: St. Thomas College, Ranni
- Occupations: Journalist, Writer, Political Analyst
- Years active: 1978 – present
- Spouse: Molly Rachel Sunny

Sunnykutty Abraham (born 19 February 1955) is an Indian journalist, writer, and political analyst based in Thiruvananthapuram, Kerala. He has been active in political journalism and media for over four and half decades specialising in political reporting.

== Early life and education ==
Sunnykutty Abraham hails from Ranni, Kerala. He completed his education at St. Thomas College, Ranni.

== Career ==
=== Journalism ===
Abraham began his journalism career with Mathrubhumi Daily, where he worked for 25 years, including serving as chief of the news bureau. He later served as chief editor and chief operating officer of JaiHind TV, a channel affiliated with the Kerala state unit of the Indian National Congress.

=== Television anchoring ===
He has anchored several Malayalam current affairs programs, including Neerkuneer and Pathravishesham on Asianet and Oppam Nadannu on Indiavision. In 2004, he received the Lovers of Indian Visual Entertainment award for Best Interview for his work on Oppam Nadannu.

He is also a regular participant in evening news debate panel discussions on various Malayalam news channels, contributing political analysis and insights on current affairs.

=== Writing ===
Sunnykutty Abraham has authored multiple books in Malayalam. His book Sabhathalam: Nammude Niyama Nirmana Sabhakal explores the functioning of legislative assemblies in India. He also co-authored Kaalam Sakshi, the autobiography of former Kerala Chief Minister Oommen Chandy, which details Chandy's political journey and key events in Kerala's political landscape.

=== Acting ===
In addition to his journalism and writing career, Abraham has appeared in Malayalam films, including Manhole (2016) and Ellam Sheriyakum (2021).
