= Moozhikulam Kacham =

Chera medieval code of law

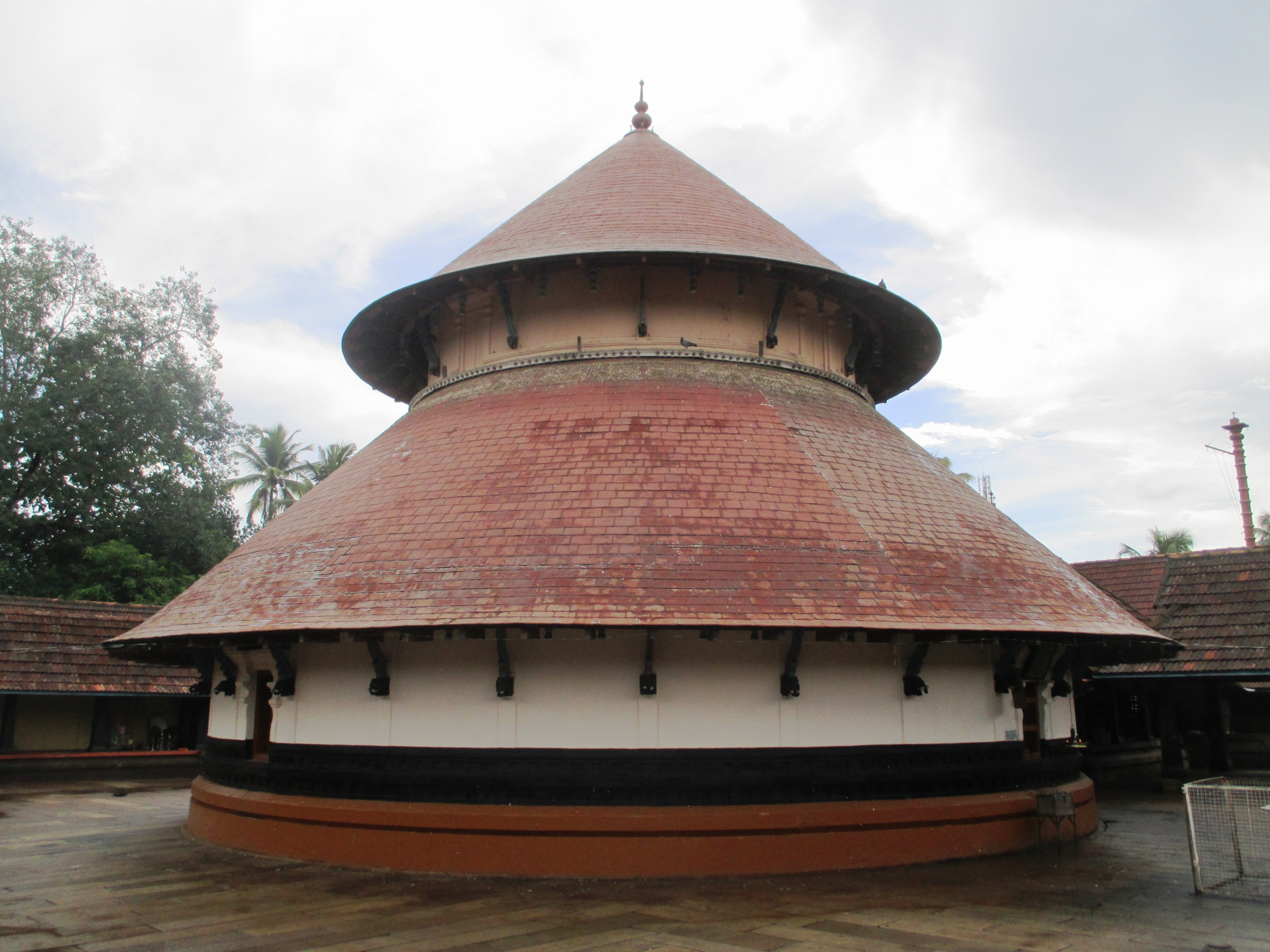
- Moozhikulam Temple

Medieval Chera state
- Territorial extent: Kerala
- Enacted by: Nalu Thali

Moozhikulam Kacham (also transliterated as Mulikkulam Kaccam) was a medieval code of law followed in the Chera kingdom of Kerala (mid-9th century — early 12th century AD), south India predominantly in regard to sustaining the authority of the landowners (the uralar) and temple trustees. It was formerly taken by traditional Kerala historians as a legislation intended to defend the interests of the medieval tenants (lessee).

The Moozhikulam covenant was first formulated in the Moozhikulam Brahmin settlement of central Kerala with royal (Chera) sanction. The head of the Moozhikulam Temple was a member of the Chera king's permanent council (the "Nalu Thali") at Mahodayapuram-Kodungallur (representing the "Mel Thali" or Thrikkulasekharapuram Temple). The original code has not yet been recovered.

The Moozhikulam Kacham was enacted mostly for the self-perpetuation of the landowners and temple trustees of medieval Kerala. The code was repeatedly cited as a "precedent" in several inscriptions. The code, in general, typically on the lines of the "dharmasastra" prescriptions, describes the imprecations and punishments for committing crimes related to temple properties and rituals, like

- Appropriating temple lands illegally
- Obstructing or plundering the cultivation [of the lands assigned to the routine expenditure of the temple]
- Default in temple expenditure

And the common punishments were confiscation of the rights and properties and excommunication.
