= M. O. Mathai =

Indian writer (1909–1981)

Mundapallil Oommen Mathai (1909 – 28 August 1981) was the Private secretary to India's first Prime Minister Jawaharlal Nehru from 1946 to 1959, when he was forced to quit following the charges of corruption. He is also known for his collaboration with the Central Intelligence Agency (CIA), and for writing politically motivated memoirs in Reminiscences of the Nehru Age (1978) and My Days with Nehru (1979).

== Early life ==
Mathai was born to a traditional Marthoma Syrian Christian family in central Travancore.

== Career ==
Mathai used to work for the United States Army in India, before becoming the Private Secretary to Nehru in 1946. He resigned from his post in 1959, after the Communists accused him of misusing his power to commit financial fraud.

He died on 28 August 1981, in Madras (now Chennai), due to a heart attack at the age of 72.

== Controversies ==
=== CIA connection ===
Mathai is noted to have worked for the Central Intelligence Agency (CIA). In 1959, Mathai was forced to quit as Nehru's secretariat following the charges of corruption. The Cabinet Secretary Vishnu Sahay investigated the case and was convinced that Mathai had compromised every file since the days of the Interim Government of India.

=== Books ===
Mathai wrote two books, Reminiscences of the Nehru Age and My Days with Nehru, during the rule of the Janata alliance government formed after ousting of Indira Gandhi's government.

The book Reminiscences of the Nehru Age has a total 49 chapters, some on Nehru's work and personal life and some on the various people that Mathai met. Mathai had falsely proclaimed himself to be "Nehru's Special Assistant" in the book, and added that "the book is not history or biography, but chatty stuff containing my reminiscences". The chapter 29 named 'She' was blanked and a note was appended in place. The contents of the chapter has since birthed intense speculations. T V Rajeswar, former chief of Intelligence Bureau has since claimed of receiving a copy of the chapter from M. G. Ramachandran and duly submitting to then-Prime Minister Indira Gandhi; he claims to have not read the contents. The blanked chapter claimed affairs Indira Gandhi had with other people and chapter also concerned the Gandhi family in general. Demands for the ban on the book were made during the Janata alliance rule but Morarji Desai refused these suggestions. His second book "My Days with Nehru" failed to gain any traction. Inder Malhotra noted that "Few books in India have got such bad reviews as Mathai's did."

== Bibliography ==
- Reminiscences Of The Nehru Age by Mathai M.O, 1978. Vikas Publishing. ISBN 978-0-7069-0621-9. (online)
- My Days With Nehru by Mathai M.O, 1978. Vikas Publishing. (online)
- Biography of M.O. Mathai by Akansha Ashish. Abhisekh Publishing, 2025. ISBN 978-81-973227-8-5.
