= Palluruthy Relief Settlement =

Indian rehabilitation shelter

Palluruthy Relief Settlement is a rehabilitation shelter, under the Cochin Vagrancy Act, for vagrant and destitute, managed by Corporation of Cochin (Kerala state, India) in association with Peoples Council for Social Justice (PCSJ), (Valanjambalam, South Cochin). Now there are 148 inmates in which 121 males and 28 females as per the date 02/02/2019. They belong to various parts of the India and brought to PRS by local police and social workers.

It is located at Palluruthy Veli in Eranakulam District of Kerala State. The staff consists of one Superintendent, health inspector (HI), psychiatric social worker and a team of nurses, attenders and care takers. The inmates enjoy freedom to a great extent inside the Settlement and also participate in the daily works. There is mainly two vocational training units with instructors and the profit of the products made by this unit are usually given to the inmates.

PRS was started by the Maharaja of Cochin in the year 1941 as a camp or shelter for beggars. In the last decade there is a remarkable improvement in the overall functioning of PRS and the local and even international community is closely associating with various programmes. PRS is successful in psychiatric rehabilitation of many inmates and sending back to their homes.

The objective of the Settlement was to accommodate destitutes, wanderers and beggars but as time passes only the psychiatric patients remain in the institution and rest of the inmates are either sent to their own homes or states they belong. That's how, the institution is well known as a psychiatric setting. Constant efforts are made by the officials to relocate the psychiatric patients with help of volunteers and government officials.
