= Yendayar =

- Town
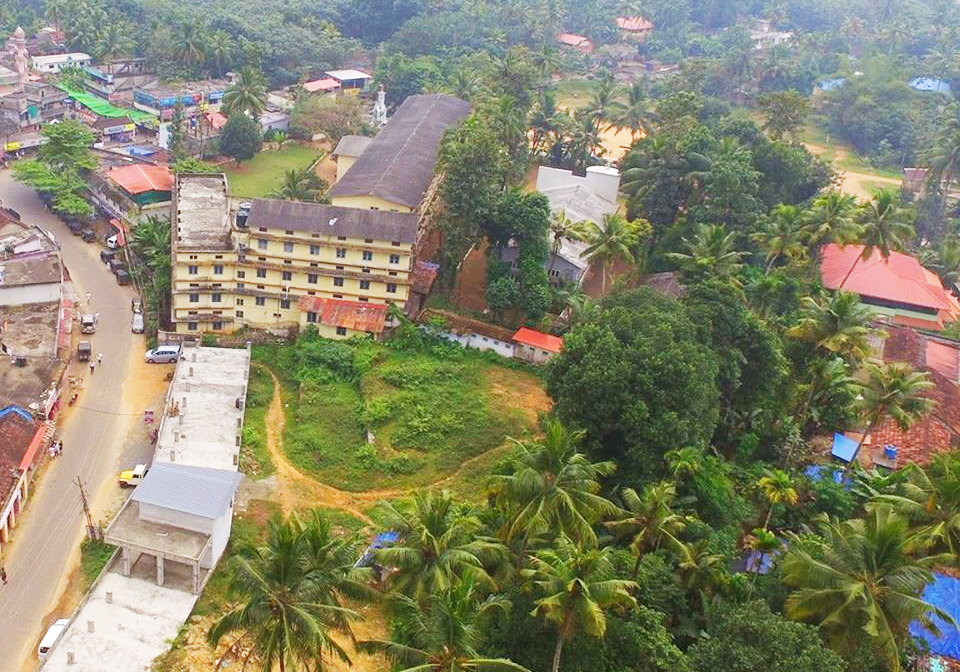

- Location in Kerala, India Yendayar (India)
- Coordinates: 9°36′0″N 76°53′0″E
- Country: India
- State: Kerala
- District: Kottayam

Languages
  - Official: Malayalam, English
- Time zone: UTC+5:30 (IST)
- PIN: 686514
- Vehicle registration: KL-34, KL-35

Yendayar is a village in kanjirappally taluk, Kottayam district, Kerala, India, that is totally surrounded by hills. The local river is the Pullakayar.

== Location ==
Yendayar is situated in the eastern border of Kottayam District, 59 km from Kottayam, and around 11 km away from Mundakayam on the NH 220 (Kottayam-Kumily Road). All the buses to Elamkadu, Mukkulam & Vadakkemala are passes through Yendayar. Mundakayam, Koottickal and Elamkadu are the nearest towns The Nearest Railway Station is Kottayam railway station and airport is Nedumbassery.

== Economy ==
Rubber plantations are the major source of income for the local population. India's first commercially successful rubber plantations are in Yendayar.

== Nearest railway station ==
- Kottayam (59 KM)

== Nearest airports ==
- Cochin International Airport (102 KM)
- Trivandrum International Airport (168 KM)
