= Treaty of Cochin =

1500 treaty between Cochin and Portugal

Treaty of Cochin (1500)
- Signed: 1500
- Location: Cochin, India.
- Negotiators: Pedro Álvares Cabral; Unni Goda Varma
- Signatories: Kingdom of Portugal; Kingdom of Cochin

The Treaty of Cochin of 1500 was an agreement signed at Cochin in the Malabar Coast, in India, between the Trimumpara Raja of Cochin and Pedro Álvares Cabral on behalf of King Manuel of Portugal. It established a trade agreement between Portugal and Cochin and a military alliance against their common enemy, the Zamorin of Calicut.

The ruler of Cochin Unni Goda Varma was a tributary vassal of Calicut who was dissatisfied with the treatment and economical dominance of the Zamorin and sought independence. Not wishing to disembark for safety reasons, Cabral communicated with the Trimumapara on land from his flagship through a Hindu ascetic who converted to Christianity, and was therefore known as Miguel Jogue. By his own initiative, the Trimumpara sent Nairs aboard the Portuguese flagship to serve as hostages so as to create mutual confidence, though these had to be replaced every morning and night because they could not eat at sea due to religious restrictions.

By the treaty the Portuguese were allowed to open a feitoria or trading post at Cochin and its first agent was Gonçalo Gil Barbosa, who remained ashore with six others. With the consent of the Trimumpara, Afonso de Albuquerque built Fort Manuel on Cochin three years later. Cochin remained a Portuguese protectorate until 1663.

== See also ==
- Portuguese India
- Treaty of Bassein (1534)
- Portuguese India Armadas
  - 2nd Portuguese India Armada (Cabral, 1500)
