= Suchindram Satyagraha =

The Suchindram Satyagraha of 1926 was one of the major events in the social movements that took place in the wake of the Vaikom Satyagraha of 1924–25. It was led by Gandhian leader Dr. M.E. Naidu. Lower caste Hindus and Christians were not allowed to walk on the paths around the Suchindram Temple near Nagercoil in present-day Kanyakumari district in Tamil Nadu. During this time region was under the Travancore Kingdom of Kerala.

== Aim ==
The main objective of the strike was to get permission for Avarna Hindus to walk along the paths around the Suchindram temple in South Travancore and to get permission to enter the temple.

== Breach of promise ==
The police advised and encouraged upper castes (Savarnas) to sit on satyagraha against the agitation. The struggle continued without any conflict. The upper castes withdrew sullenly. Changanassery Parameswaran Pillai held talks with the government. Diwan Watts, Police Commissioner Pitt and Devaswom Commissioner R. Krishna Pillai assured Changanassery Parameswaran Pillai that permission would be given for the freedom of movement through the streets within a month and hence the strike should be stopped. The strike was temporarily called off on February 1. Even after three years, the conditions were not met.

The strike resumed in 1930. A Balakrishna Pillai strongly supported the strike through the Prabodhakan newspaper. Later, after a favorable verdict was obtained on the petition filed in the High Court, the public roads were opened to the lower castes (Avarnas).
