= Prathyaksha Raksha Daiva Sabha =

Indian religion founded in 1909

- Abbreviation: PRDS
- Type: Religion, New Religious Movement, Dalit Liberation Theology, Kerala Renaissance Movement
- Headquarters: Sreekumar Nagar Eraviperoor
- Founder: Poikayil Yohannan aka Poikayil Sreekumara Gurudevan (Divine Identity)

Prathyaksha Raksha Daiva Sabha (PRDS) emerged as a pivotal socio-religious movement for Dalit communities in early 20th-century Kerala, India. It was founded in 1910 by Poikayil Yohannan (also known as Poikayil Appachan, Posthumously as Sree Kumara Gurudevan). It addressed centuries of caste-based oppression faced by groups like Parayas, Pulayas, and others labeled as "untouchables". PRDS blended elements of Christianity with Dalit experiences, critiquing both Hindu caste hierarchies and missionary Christianity's failures to deliver true equality. It emphasized spiritual and material upliftment, self-governance, and ritual discourses centered on ancestral slavery.

== Early History ==
Kerala's pre-colonial society was rigidly feudal and caste-stratified, with Dalits excluded from temples, schools, roads, and public spaces. Protestant missionaries in the 19th century introduced ideas of equality, leading to mass Dalit conversions to Christianity for social mobility, but caste discrimination persisted within churches like CMS, Marthoma, and Brethren denominations. Converts faced segregation, intermarriage bans, and inferior treatment by Syrian Christians. PRDS arose as a breakaway, independent response to these injustices.

== Early Development ==
Poikayil Yohannan, born a Sambava (Paraya) around 1879, converted to Christianity as a child, joining Marthomite and later other denominations. But following the caste prejudices and discrimination within these churches with co-founders like Njaliyakuzhi Simon Yohannan (Njaliyakuzhi Asan) and Koduveli Varghese, he established PRDS in the year 1910 officially. Even though the movement started way before 1910. Yohannan's charismatic preaching, prophecies, and Bible interpretations critiqued churches for perpetuating casteism and Hinduism for exploitation. Under Yohannan, PRDS fostered education, land ownership, and community consolidation, mirroring broader Kerala reform discourses. Followers gifted lands for PRDS institutions, promoting education and asset-building. He led PRDS until his death in 1939, amassing properties and followers through esoteric worship, songs, and revelations that deified him as God's incarnation (avatar).

== Schism ==
After Yohannan's death in 1939, disputes arose between two factions in PRDS. V. Janamma, Yohannan's widow who managed affairs, led one group (Janamma PRDS) and Co-Founder and former president of the sabha Njaliyakuzhi Simon Yohannan led the other group (Asan PRDS).

In 1950, Janamma's faction declared themselves a Hindu sect during a Hindu Mahila Samajam meeting in Kaviyur. Meanwhile, Njaliyakuzhi Simon Yohannan's group kept following the older Christian traditions. Janamma's side changed Yohannan's name to Sree Kumara Gurudevan during this period.

The conflict went to court in 1952. The Kerala High Court case (Janamma v. Joseph) ruled in September 1966 that PRDS was not Christian because it lacked sacraments and viewed Yohannan as an avatar. This decision supported Janamma's claim to manage the properties.
