= Elamkadu =

- village
- Location in Kerala, India Elamkadu (India)
- Coordinates: 9°38′2″N 76°52′40″E
- Country: India
- State: Kerala
- District: Kottayam

Government
  - Body: Koottickal Grama Panchayath

Languages
  - Official: Malayalam, English
- Time zone: UTC+5:30 (IST)
- PIN: 686514
- Vehicle registration: KL-35, KL-34
- Nearest city: Mundakayam
- Civic agency: Mundakayam Grama Panchayath

Elamkadu is a village in Kottayam, Kerala, India. The nearest city is Mundakayam which lies 14 km to the south of Elamkadu. The closest transport links are the railway station in Kottayam and the airport in Kochin. The Manimalayar river, also known locally as the Pullakayar, originates in the nearby Elamkadu hills.
