= Philipose Mar Chrysostom Mar Thoma =

Metropolitan Emeritus of the Mar Thoma Syrian Church of India (1918–2021)

His Beatitude Philipose Mar Chrysostom Mar Thoma XX
- Mar Thoma Metropolitan and Primate of the Apostolic See of St.Thomas
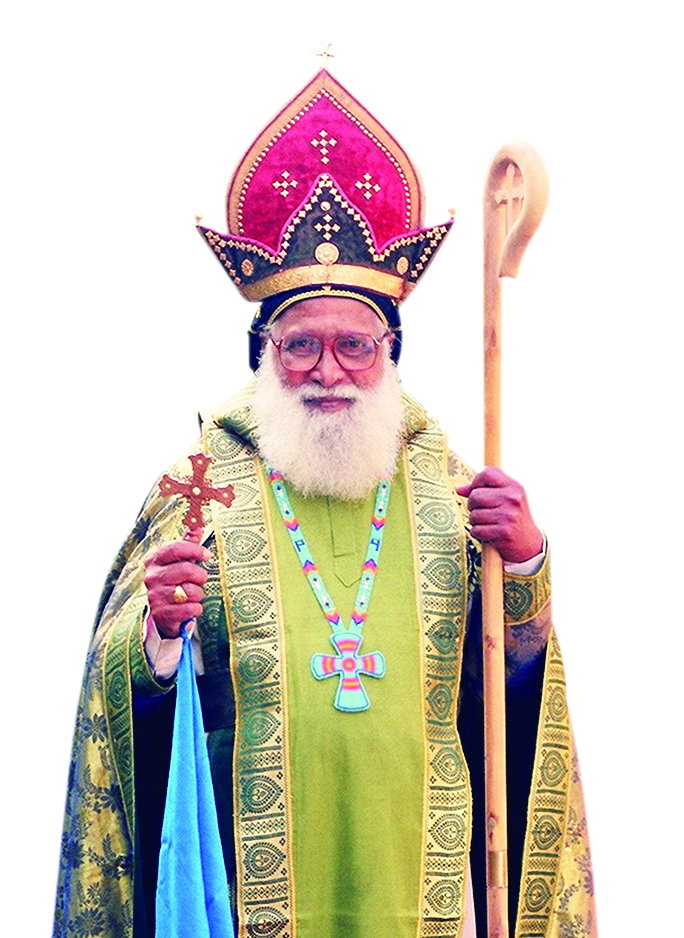
- Church: Malankara Mar Thoma Syrian Church
- Installed: 23 October 1999
- Term ended: 2 October 2007
- Predecessor: Alexander Mar Thoma
- Successor: Joseph Mar Thoma

Orders
- Ordination: 1 January 1944
- Consecration: 23 May 1953
- Rank: Mar Thoma Metropolitan (Ecclesiastical Title of the Head of the Ancient Indian Church)

Personal details
- Born: Philip Oommen; 27 April 1918 Eraviperoor, Thiruvalla, Travancore
- Died: 5 May 2021 (aged 103) Thiruvalla, Kerala, India
- Buried: S.C.S, Thiruvalla

Philipose Mar Chrysostom Mar Thoma XX (born Philip Oommen; 27 April 1918 – 5 May 2021) was an Indian prelate who served as Metropolitan of the Malankara Mar Thoma Syrian Church from 1999-2007 and Valiya Metropolitan (Metropolitan Emeritus) from 2007 until his death. He was the world's longest serving bishop, serving for −67 years, 11 months and 12 days. He was addressed and referred to as Chrysostom Thirumeni or Valiya Thirumeni after his retirement. He was also a known humorist. He was awarded India's third highest civilian award, the Padma Bhushan, in 2018.

== Early life and education ==
Philipose Mar Chrysostom was born as Philip Oommen. His father was K. E. Oommen, who served as Vicar General of the Church and belonged to the Kalamannil family of Adangapuram, Kumbanad, near Thiruvalla. His mother, Sosamma, was from the Nadukke Veettil family of Karthikappally.

Philip received his early education at schools in Maramon, Kozhencherry, and Eraviperoor, and subsequently graduated from Union Christian College.

He was ordained as a deacon of the Mar Thoma Syrian Church on 1 January 1944 and as a priest (Kasseessa) on 3 June 1944. On 20 May 1952, he was elevated to the rank of Ramban, a senior monastic and ecclesiastical title within the Syriac Christian tradition.

== Consecration ==
As the activities of the Church expanded, the Sabha Pratinidhi Mandalam (Representative Assembly) of the Mar Thoma Syrian Church resolved to consecrate additional bishops, among whom was Rev. Philip Oommen.

On 23 May 1953, Philip Oommen Ramban was consecrated to the episcopate and received the title Philipose Mar Chrysostom.

During his episcopal ministry, he served as President of the National Council of Churches in India and actively participated in the international ecumenical movement. He attended the assemblies of the World Council of Churches held at Evanston, Illinois in 1954 and Uppsala in 1968. He also participated in sessions of the Second Vatican Council, reflecting his longstanding commitment to inter-church dialogue and ecumenical engagement.

=== Episcopa ===
On 23 May 1953, Rev. Philip Oommen was consecrated to the episcopate by the Metropolitan, Juhanon Mar Thoma, assisted by the Episopa, Mathews Mar Athanasius. Upon his consecration, he received the episcopal title Philipose Mar Chrysostom.

On the same occasion, Rev. M. G. Chandy and Rev. Panampunna Thomas were also consecrated as bishops, receiving the episcopal titles Alexander Mar Theophilus (later Alexander Mar Thoma) and Thomas Mar Athanasius, respectively.

In 1954, Mar Chrysostom joined St Augustine's College, Kent, to further his theological studies.

=== Suffragan Metropolitan ===
He was designated as Suffragan Metropolitan in May 1978.

When the newly-formed Diocese Zone in New York was created in the 1980s, Chrysostom was placed in charge of this area.

=== Officiating Metropolitan ===
After Alexander Mar Thoma Metropolitan stepped aside from the daily administration of the church due to ill-health on 15 March 1999, Mar Chrysostom was designated Officiating Metropolitan.

=== Metropolitan ===
Mar Chrysostom was installed as Metropolitan, Philipose Mar Thoma, on 23 October 1999 when Alexander Mar Thoma Metropolitan was made Valiya Metropolitan. (Senior Metropolitan)

=== Navathy Home Project ===
On 27 April 2008, Philipose Mar Thoma completed his 90th year. To mark the occasion, the Mar Thoma Syrian Church initiated the Navathy Home Project (Malayalam: Navathy, meaning ninetieth anniversary), aimed at supporting economically disadvantaged families in building residential homes, irrespective of caste, creed, or religion.

The project sought to assist approximately 1,500 families across India in constructing houses, each estimated at a cost of ₹1,50,000 (approximately US$2,400 at the time). Each dwelling typically included a sit-out, drawing room, bedroom, kitchen, dining area, and toilet facilities. The initiative received substantial financial support from Church members and was later extended beyond India, including implementation in Mexico.

=== Metropolitan Emeritus ===
Philipose Mar Thoma expressed his desire to transfer responsibilities of the church to his successor due to old age and deteriorating health, as a result, Joseph Mar Irenaeus was installed as Joseph Mar Thoma XXI Metropolitan on 2 October 2007. He continued as Philipose Mar Chrysostom Mar Thoma Valiya Metropolitan (Metropolitan Emeritus).

=== Centenary ===
On his hundredth birthday, on 27 April 2018, the church officially inaugurated the Project among the Transgender Community.

A documentary film titled 100 Years of Chrysostom, directed by Indian filmmaker Blessy, was produced as a comprehensive biographical account of Philipose Mar Chrysostom. The film has a runtime of approximately 48 hours and 10 minutes and is regarded as one of the longest biographical documentary productions.

== Padma Bhushan ==
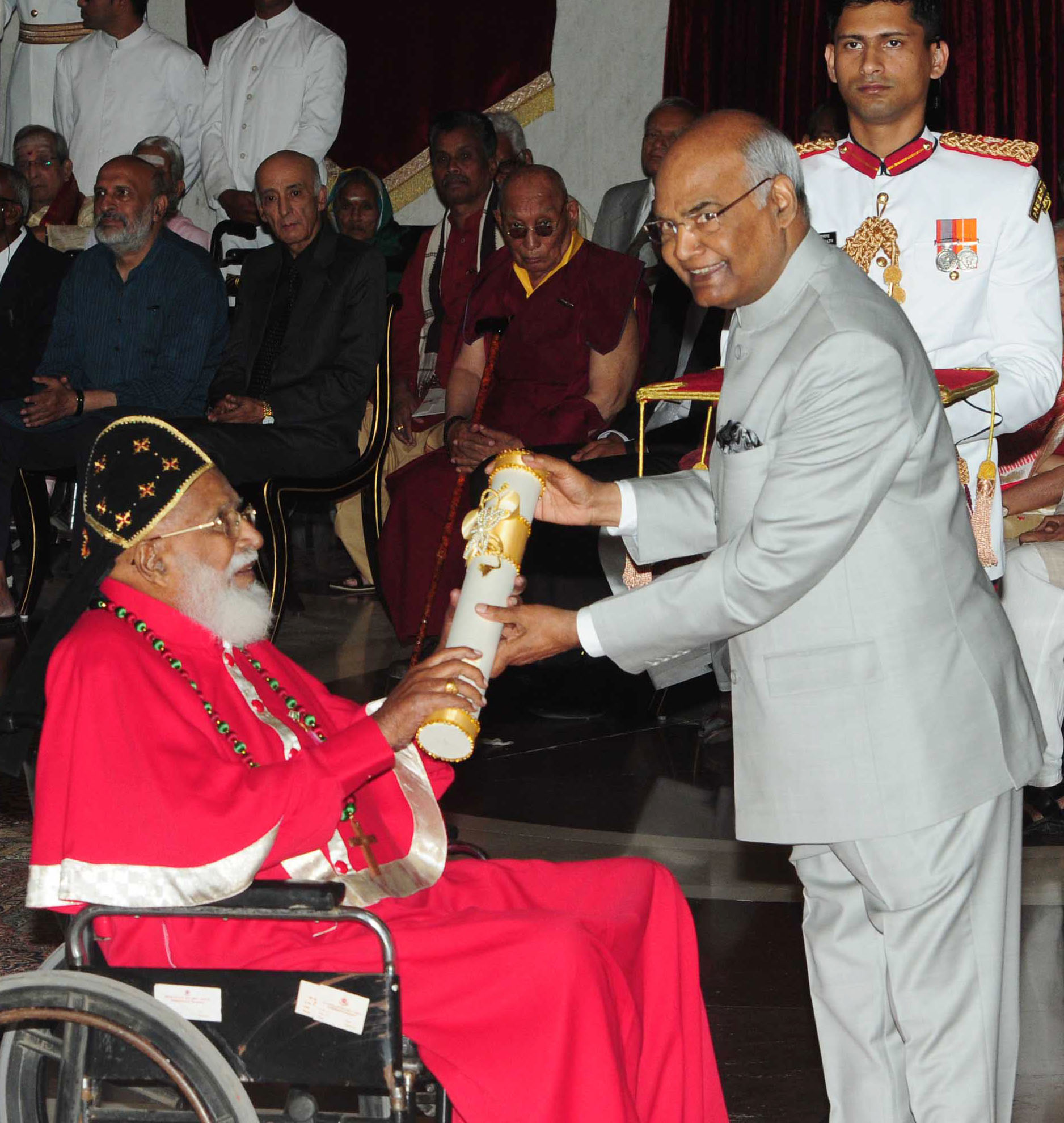
The President, Shri Ram Nath Kovind presenting the Padma Bhushan Award to Philipose Mar Chrysostom, at the Civil Investiture Ceremony, at Rashtrapati Bhavan, in New Delhi

The Republic of India awarded the Padma Bhushan to Philipose Mar Chrysostom for services to society. It was officially declared on the eve of Republic Day 2018 and he was awarded on 20 March 2018.

== Death ==
Philipose Mar Chrysostom died on 5 May 2021 at his residence soon after being hospitalized. He died of natural causes.

== See also ==
- Throne of St. Thomas
- Syrian Malabar Nasrani
- Saint Thomas Christians
- Christianity in India
- List of Syrian Malabar Nasranis
- Joseph Mar Thoma

Mar Thoma Church Titles
Preceded by Alexander Mar Thoma	XX Mar Thoma Metropolitan of the Malankara Mar Thoma Syrian Church; 1999–2007	Succeeded by Joseph Mar Thoma
