= Alexander Mar Thoma =

Indian bishop (1913–2000)

His Beatitude The Most Reverend Aboon Dr. Alexander Mar Thoma XIX Mar Thoma Metropolitan
- of the Apostolic See of St Thomas
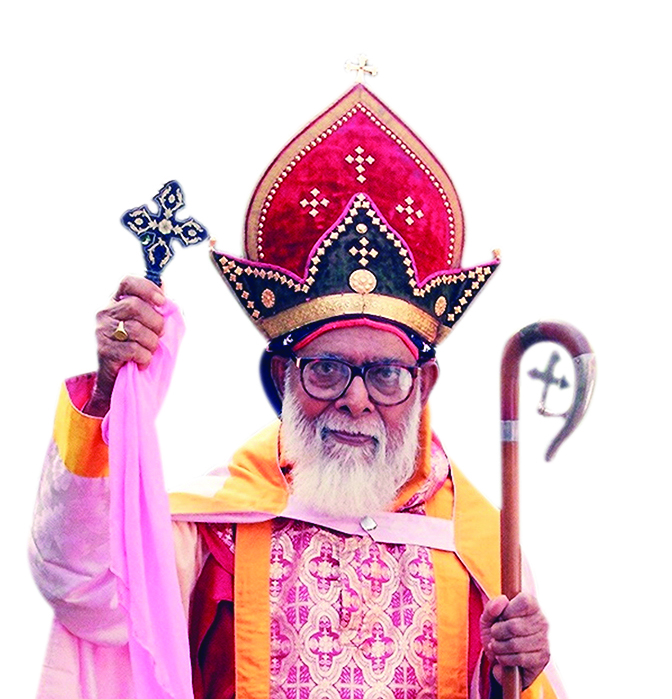
- Church: Mar Thoma Syrian Church
- Installed: 23 October 1976
- Term ended: 23 October 1999
- Predecessor: Juhanon Mar Thoma
- Successor: Philipose Mar Chrysostom

Orders
- Ordination: 7 June 1946
- Consecration: 23 May 1953
- Rank: Mar Thoma Metropolitan (Ecclesiastical Title of the Head of the Ancient Indian Church)

Personal details
- Born: Maliackel George Chandy; 10 April 1913 Kuriannoor, British Raj
- Died: 11 January 2000 (aged 87) Kumbanad, Kerala, India
- Buried: S.C.S, Thiruvalla

Alexander Mar Thoma XIX (born Maliackel George Chandy; 10 April 1913 – 11 January 2000) was the Metropolitan of the Malankara Mar Thoma Syrian Church with its center in Kerala state in south-western India from 1976 to 2000.

== Early life and education ==
Alexander Mar Thoma was born as M. G. Chandy on 10 April 1913 in Kuriannoor, a village situated on the banks of the Pamba River in present-day Kerala, India, near Maramon, Ayroor, Thadiyoor, and Pullad. He was baptised at Maramon Church by Rev. A. V. Mathew. He was born into the Maliackel family, a prominent family in the region. His father, Rev. M. C. George, served as vicar of the Mar Thoma parish at Kuriannoor, while his mother, Mariamma, belonged to the Anjilivelil family of Maramon. His parents called him Kunjachen.

Chandy began his formal education at the age of four. In 1922, when he was ten years old, his father died, after which he was enrolled at a high school in Kozhencherry.

He subsequently pursued higher education at Maharaja's College and Union Christian College. After completing his studies, he joined C. M. S. High School, Kottayam as a mathematics teacher, a position he held for approximately twelve years. During this period, he also became actively involved in various social and community activities.

== Ordination ==
While making arrangements to pursue further studies in Agra, Chandy was invited by Abraham Mar Thoma to enter the ordained ministry of the Church. He accepted the invitation and, in 1945, enrolled at United Theological College, Bangalore. He was ordained to the clergy on 7 June 1946 and subsequently served as assistant vicar of the Mar Thoma parish in Bangalore while continuing his theological studies.

After completing his course in 1948, he was admitted to Union Theological Seminary, where he earned the degree of Master of Sacred Theology (S. T. M. ). In 1949, he joined Hartford Seminary in Hartford, Connecticut, for doctoral studies and was awarded a Ph.D. in 1951. His doctoral dissertation was titled Viśvarūpa Darśana: A Study of the Vision of God in the Bhagavad Gītā.

Upon his return to India in 1951, he was appointed vicar of the Mar Thoma Church at Manganam, near Kottayam, where he served for about a year.

In 1952, the Mar Thoma Syrian Church established a college for higher education at Thiruvalla. Rev. M. G. Chandy was appointed as its first principal.

== Consecration ==
=== Episcopa ===
As the activities and administrative responsibilities of the Church expanded, the Mandalam (Representative Assembly) of the Mar Thoma Syrian Church determined that three additional bishops were required to assist in its leadership and pastoral oversight. Among those selected for consecration was Rev. Chandy.

On 23 May 1953, Rev. M. G. Chandy was consecrated to the episcopate by Juhanon Mar Thoma, assisted by Mathews Mar Athanasius. Upon consecration, he received the episcopal title Alexander Mar Theophilus.

On the same occasion, Rev. Panampunna Thomas and Rev. Philip Oommen were also consecrated as bishops, receiving the episcopal titles Thomas Mar Athanasius and Philipose Mar Chrysostom, respectively.

=== Suffragan Metropolitan ===
He was ordained as a suffragan in 1974 and was given the title Alexander Mar Theophilus Suffragan Metropolitan.

== Metropolitan ==
Malankara Throne

=== Enthronement ===
Juhanon Mar Thoma Metropolitan died in 1976. Being the senior bishop, Alexander Mar Theophilus Suffragan Metropolitan was enthroned as the next Metropolitan on 23 October 1976 at Kottayam and was given the name Alexander Mar Thoma Metropolitan.

=== Developmental projects ===
To promote the socio-economic development of underprivileged communities and economically disadvantaged groups, Alexander Mar Thoma encouraged and supported the establishment of several development initiatives under the auspices of the Church.

These included the Christian Agency for Rural Development and the South Travancore Agency for Rural Development, both of which focused on rural development and community welfare. Programmes specifically aimed at women's empowerment included the Sthree Jana Vikasana Samithi and the Mar Thoma Centre for Rehabilitation and Development.

The Church also established educational institutions for disadvantaged groups, including the Nava Jyothi School for children from underprivileged backgrounds and the Giri Deepthi School for tribal communities residing in hilly regions.

=== Ecumenical relations ===
During this period, increasing numbers of members of the Mar Thoma Syrian Church migrated to various regions of India and later to countries abroad. The growth of these dispersed congregations necessitated closer cooperation with established Christian denominations in the areas where Mar Thoma communities had settled. As a result, the Church developed ecumenical relationships with several churches in India and internationally.

Alexander Mar Thoma also served as President of the Bible Society of India for a period of ten years.

The Mar Thoma Church became an active participant in the ecumenical movement and maintained membership in the World Council of Churches. In 1978, it joined with the Church of South India and the Church of North India to establish a joint council for cooperation and common witness.

The Church also entered into full communion with the Anglican Communion. In this capacity, Alexander Mar Thoma attended the enthronement of Robert Runcie as Archbishop of Canterbury in 1980 and later participated in the Anglican Consultative Council meeting held in Nairobi in 1984.

== Death ==
By 1999, the health of Alexander Mar Thoma had deteriorated, prompting him to seek the transfer of his administrative responsibilities to his successor. In accordance with a decision of the Church's Mandalam (Representative Assembly), he was elevated to the position of Valiya Thirumeni (Senior Metropolitan), becoming the first person in the history of the Mar Thoma Syrian Church to hold that title.

The day-to-day leadership and responsibilities of the Church were entrusted to Philipose Mar Chrysostom, who was then serving as Suffragan Metropolitan.

Alexander Mar Thoma died on 11 January 2000 and was interred in the Bishops' Cemetery within the S.C.S. Compound at Thiruvalla.

== See also ==
- Throne of St. Thomas
- List of Malankara metropolitans
- Syrian Malabar Nasrani
- Saint Thomas Christians
- Christianity in India
- Malankara Metropolitan
- List of Saint Thomas Christians

Mar Thoma Church Titles
| Preceded by Juhanon Mar Thoma | XIX Mar Thoma Metropolitan of the Malankara Mar Thoma Syrian Church; 1976–1999 | Succeeded by Philipose Mar Chrysostom |
