= Poykayil Yohannan =

Indian poet and religious leader (1879–1939)

- Born: Kumaran; 17 February 1879; Eraviperoor, Travancore, present day Pathanamthitta district, Kerala, India
- Died: 29 June 1939 (aged 60)
- Occupations: poet; social reformer
- Spouse(s): Marampadathu Mariyam (Separated), V. Janamma
- Writing career
- Genres: Poetry; theology; activism

Poykayil Yohannan (17 February 1879 – 29 June 1939), known as Poykayil Appachan or Poykayil Sreekumaragurudevan, (Note: Poykayil Sree Kumara Gurudevan – Posthumous divine identity created by Janamma PRDS faction during schism.; Poykayil Appachan – The respected father from Poykayil.; Poykayil Yohannan – John from Poykayil (Yohannan is the Malayalam equivalent of John).) was an Indian spiritual leader, poet, Dalit emancipator, renaissance leader and the founder of the Prathyaksha Raksha Daiva Sabha, a socio-religious movement dedicated to the spiritual liberation and social upliftment of the oppressed castes of Kerala.

== Early life ==
Poykayil Yohannan, born on 17 February 1879 in ( Eraviperoor near Tiruvalla in central Travancore )now Kerala, pathanamthitta, grew up in a region which were dominated by upper-caste Hindus and Syrian Christians, which influenced his later efforts in organizing and uplifting oppressed communities. His parents were Kandan and Lechi of Paraiyar community, who were recently freed African slaves. They were servants for Christian families namely Sankaramangalam. His birth name was kumaran later called Kumaran; at age five he was baptized and renamed Yohannan (Malayalam for John)

== Religious work ==
Yohannan joined the Mar Thoma Syrian Church, a sect among the Syrian Christians but realised the church treated Dalits as an inferior class, and so left it. He then joined a new sect called the Brethren Mission where he faced similar instances of caste based discrimination. Yohannan concluded that Indian Christian communities continued to discriminate based on caste, and felt this defied the basic tenets of Christianity.

In 1909, Yohannan broke from institutional Christianity to establish the Prathyaksha Raksha Daiva Sabha. While he rejected the church hierarchy and caste-based practices, he retained Trinitarian language and biblical references in his teachings. The Kerala High Court in Janamma v. Joseph (1966) recorded that the Sabha's main tenet was that 'God, The Father, came down from Heaven as Poikayil Yohannan.

== Work as a legislator ==
Appachan was nominated twice, in 1921 and 1931, to the Sree Moolam Praja Sabha, the legislative council of the princely state of Travancore.

== In popular culture ==
- Mannikkale Maanikkyam - Drama written by V. V. Santha kumar that features life of Appachan
- A documentary film titled Roopakam (Metaphor), directed by Prasobh Divakaran, also showcases the life and contributions of Poykayil Appachan. The film was selected for screening in the Focus category of the 12th International Documentary and Short Film Festival of Kerala (IDSFFK).

== See also ==
- Narayana Guru
- Ayyankali
- Chattampi Swamikal
