= Kottayam district =

- District
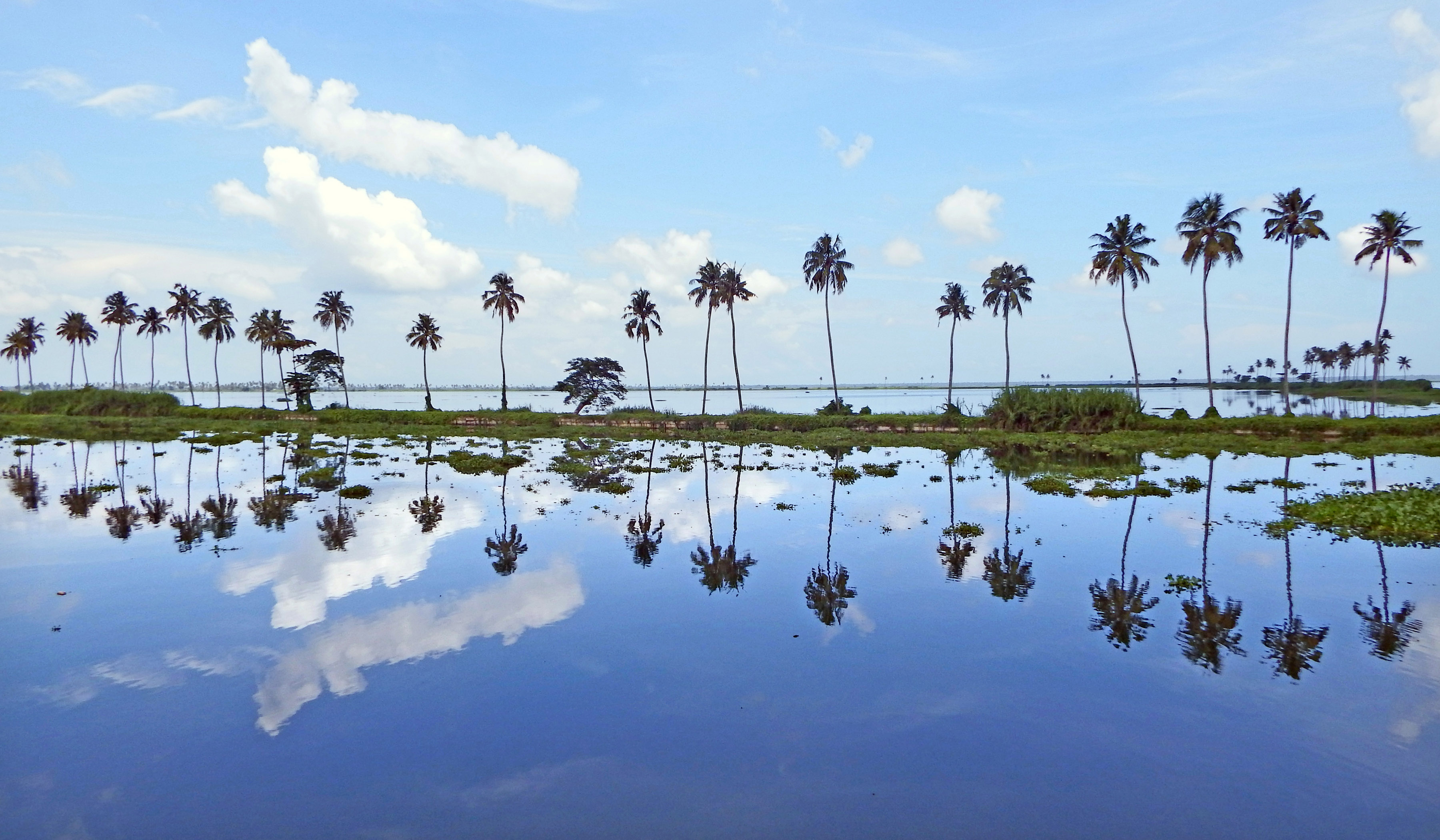
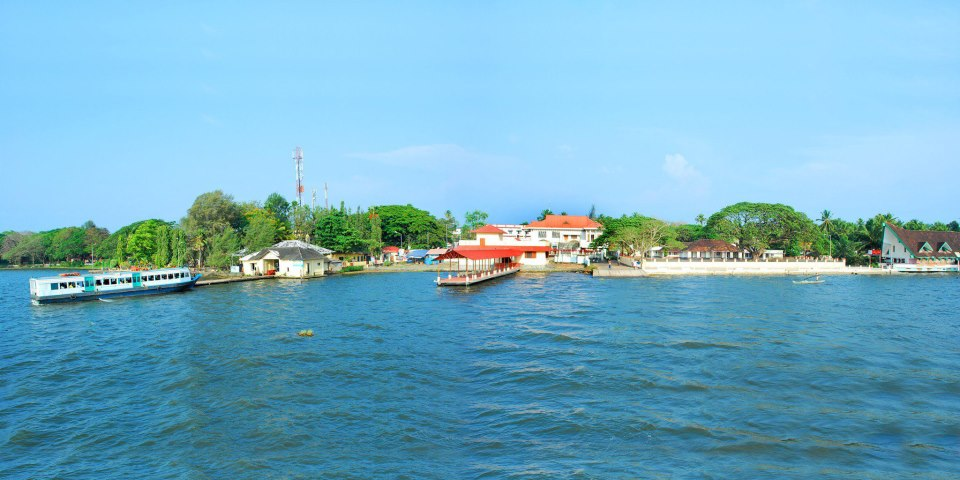
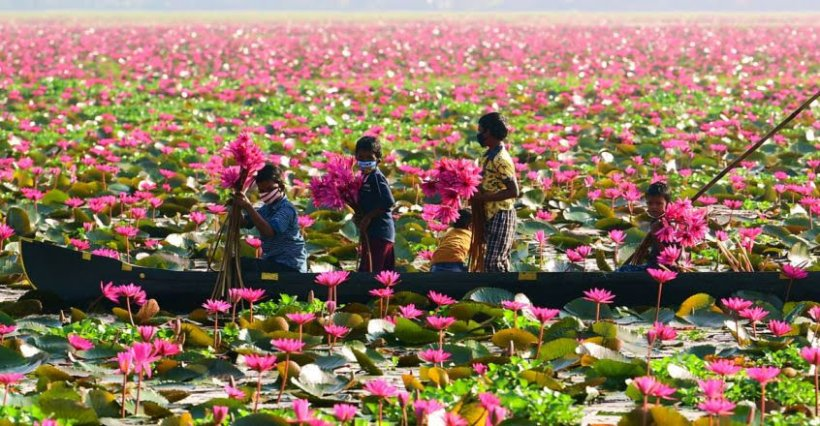
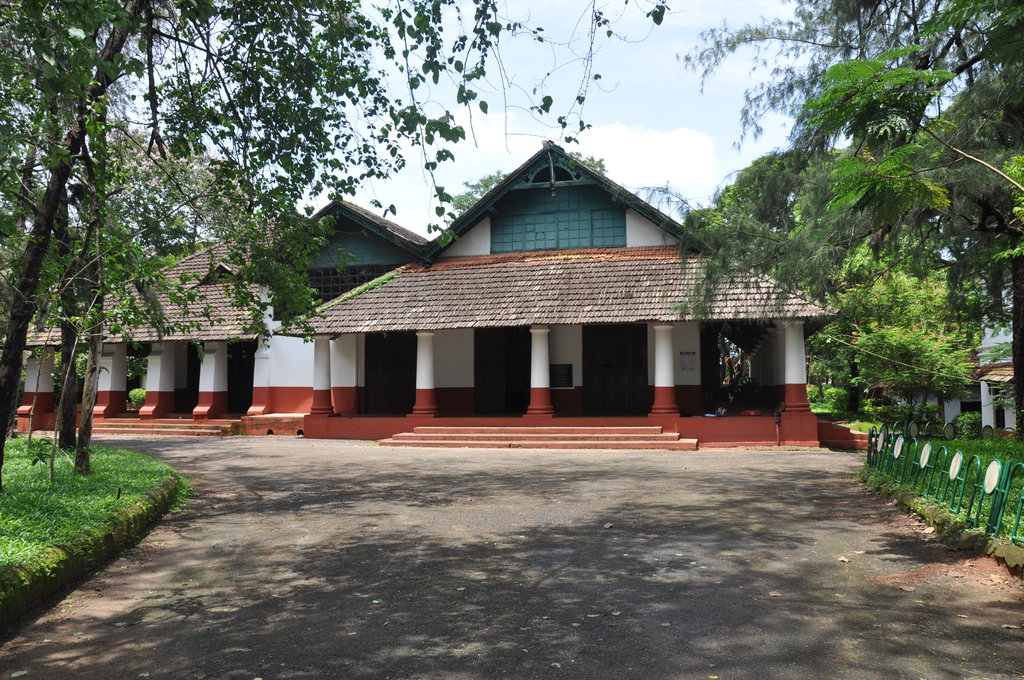
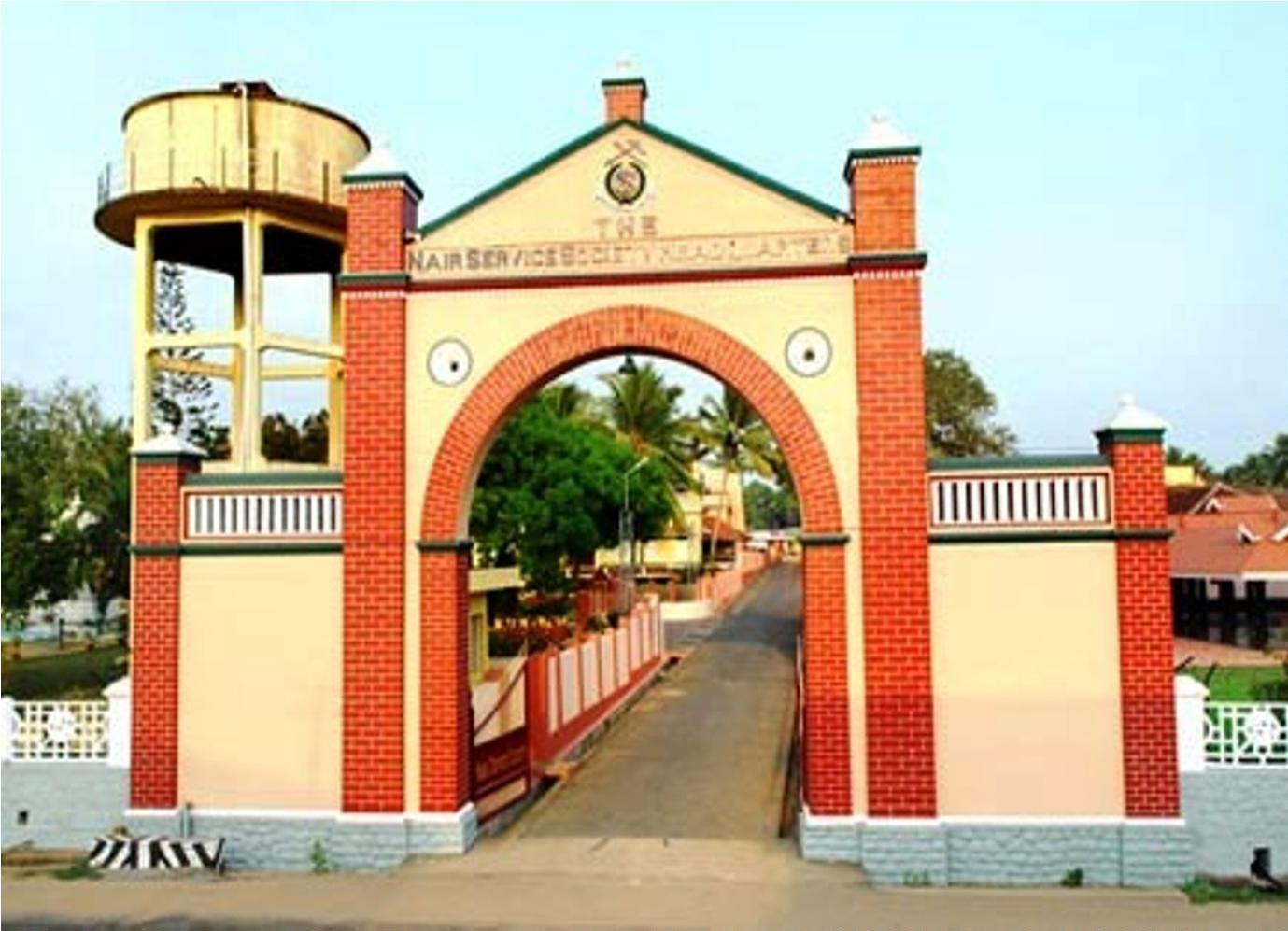
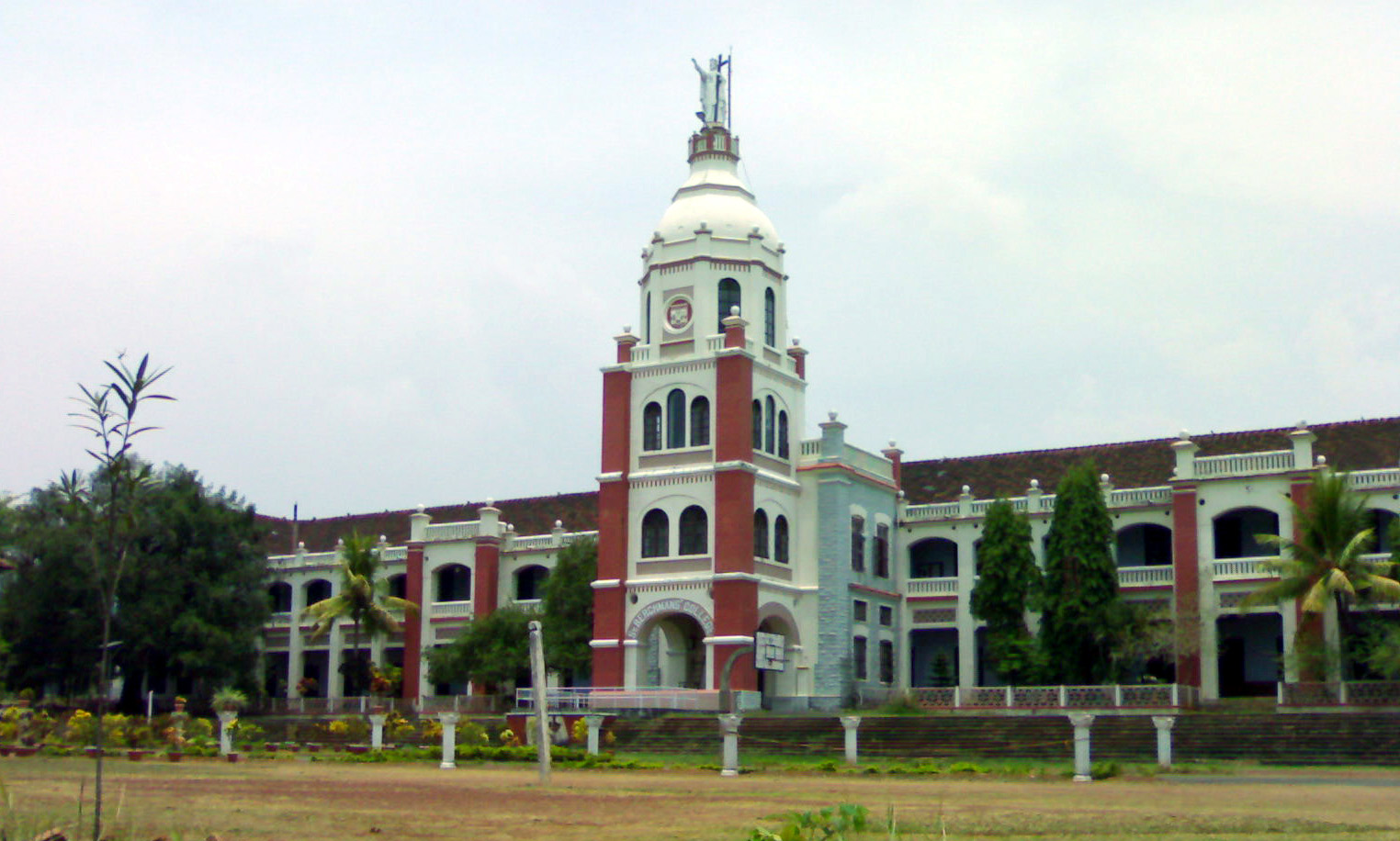
- Clockwise from top: Kumarakom, Malarikkal, Nair Service Society at Changanassery, SB College Changanassery, CMS College Kottayam, and Vaikom Boat Jetty.

- Location in Kerala
- Interactive map of Kottayam district
- Coordinates: 9.595°N 76.531°E
- Country: India
- State: Kerala
- Established: 1 July 1949
- Headquarters: Kottayam
- Subdivisions: Revenue Divisions: 2: Kottayam; Pala; Taluks: 5: Kottayam; Vaikom; Meenachil; Changanassery; Kanjirappally

Government
  - Collector: Chethan Kumar Meena IAS
  - District Police Chief: Shahul Hameed A, IPS

Area
  - Total: 2,208 km^{2} (853 sq mi)
  - Rank: 10th

Population
  - Total: 1,974,551
  - Density: 894.3/km^{2} (2,316/sq mi)

Languages
  - Official: Malayalam, English
- Time zone: UTC+5:30 (IST)
- Postal code: 686***
- ISO 3166 code: IN-KL
- Vehicle registration: KL-05 Kottayam, KL-33 Changanassery, KL-34 Kanjirappally, KL-35 Pala, KL-36 Vaikom, KL-67 Uzhavoor
- HDI (2005): ▲0.796 ( High)
- Website: kottayam.nic.in/en/

Kottayam district (IPA: [koːʈːɐjɐm]) is one of 14 districts in the Indian state of Kerala. Kottayam district comprises six municipal towns: Kottayam, Changanassery, Pala, Erattupetta, Ettumanoor, and Vaikom. Situated in the central part of Kerala, Kottayam shares its borders with Ernakulam, Idukki, Pathanamthitta, and Alappuzha districts. It is the only district in Kerala that does not border either the Arabian Sea or another Indian state.

The district is bordered by hills in the east, and the Vembanad Lake and paddy fields of Kuttanad on the west. The area's geographic features include paddy fields, highlands, and hills. As of the 2011 census, 28.6% of the district's residents live in urban areas, and it reports a 97.2% literacy rate. In 2008, the district became the first tobacco-free district in India. Kottayam registered the lowest Multidimensional Poverty Index (MPI) of zero among all districts of India, indicating no deprivation as per the report published by Oxford Poverty and Human Development Initiative and UNDP for districts across India. The district's headquarters are based in the city of Kottayam.

Hindustan Newsprint Limited and Rubber Board are two central government organizations located in the district. The headquarters of two religious communities in Kerala are also in the Kottayam District: Nair Service Society and the Indian Orthodox Church.

== Etymology ==
The name Kottayam is a combination of the words "kotta" and "akam" in the local language of Malayalam, meaning "interior of a fort".

== History ==
=== Prehistoric period ===
A substantial portion of Kottayam district may have been under the Arabian Sea during prehistoric times. Marine fossils have been found in an area near Changanassery, thus supporting the hypothesis.

However, there are archaeological evidences of the early human inhabitation period of this district, including ancient fossils, stone inscriptions and monuments, in the archeological sites like the excavation sites, the caves, the temples, etc. The literary works of the Sangam period also help to take a look into the ancient period of the district.

=== Classical Antiquity ===
==== Chera dynasty and the Keralaputras of ancient Tamilakam (up to 5th century CE) ====
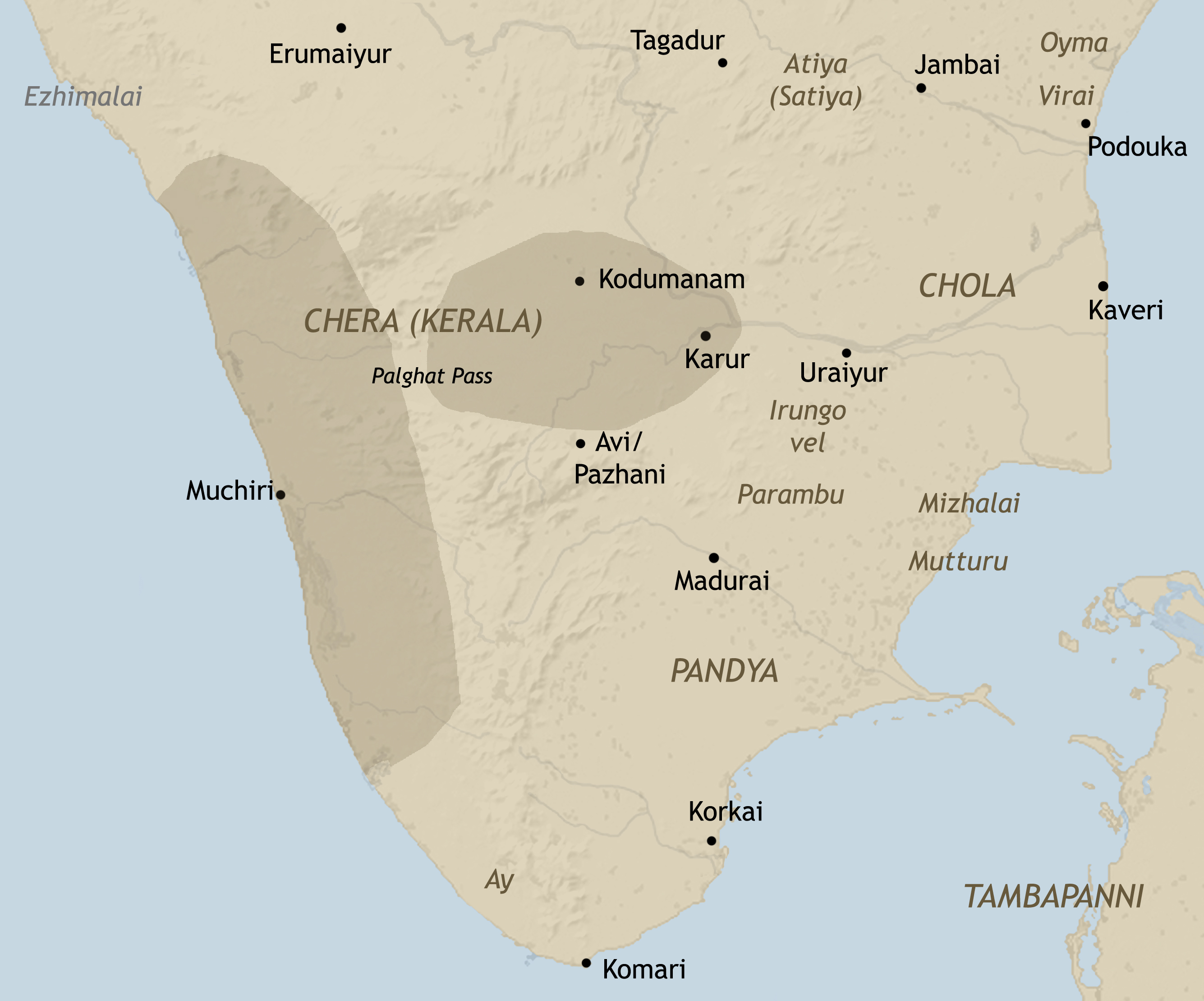
The extent of the Chera dynasty (known as Keralaputras in the inscriptions of the emperor Ashoka of the Maurya Empire (322 BCE – 184 BCE) during the early centuries of the Common Era.

Early members of the Chera dynasty (first few centuries of the Common Era) had their original headquarters in a region called Kuzhamur at Kuttanad in the ancient Tamilakam and were sometimes known as the Kuttuvans. The Chera dynasty is mentioned as Keralaputras in the inscriptions of the emperor Ashoka of the Maurya Empire (322 BCE – 184 BCE).

The province Kuttanad of the ancient kingdom of Keralaputras included the modern-day districts of Kottayam, Ernakulam, Idukki, and parts of Alappuzha, which can be defined as the region between the rivers Periyar and Pamba. It was bounded by the Ay kingdom to the south, which included the regions between Pamba River and Kanyakumari (Cape Comorin), and the province of Kudanad, which lies between the rivers Periyar and Chaliyar (modern-day districts of Thrissur, Palakkad, and Malappuram), to the north.

It was during the reign of Uthiyan Cheralathan (105–130 CE) that the Chera dynasty began to expand towards the northern and the eastern regions of Kuttanad by conquering the provinces of Kudanadu and Kongu Nadu. Afterwards the dynasty got split into three branches and fixed their capitals at Muziris, Tyndis, and Caroura, respectively, as seen in the ancient Greco-Roman travelogues as well as the Old Tamil literary works of the Sangam period. During the reign of Narmudi Cheral, the regions included in the Kingdom of Ezhimala was also added to the Chera empire.

==== Invasions and social transformation from 6th century CE to 800 CE ====
The ancient Chera empire collapsed due to the continuous invasions carried out by the Kalabhras, the Pallavas, the Chalukyas, the Pandyas, and the Rashtrakutas during the period between 500 CE and 800 CE for nearly three centuries. This era marked the migration of Nambudiri Brahmins into the district, which later led to a transformation in the social structure of the region after the 10th century CE. The ancient prominent religions in the district like Buddhism began to vanish after the 10th century CE. Sri Mulavasam was a prominent centre of Buddhism in the Indian peninsula until the early medieval period, prior to the Chera-Chola wars of the 11th century CE.

=== Medieval history ===
The regions included in the modern-day district of Kottayam is described well in the medieval Kerala literature which includes works written in both Malayalam and Sanskrit. The 14th century Sanskrit work Sukasandesam describes about Kaduthuruthy. Similarly the 17th century Sanskrit work Bhramara Sandesam contains details about Kumaranalloor and Vaikom. The 18th century Sanskrit literary work Chathaka Sandesam also contains references to Vaikom.

Unnuneeli Sandesam, a work which belongs to the Malayalam literature written during early decades of the 14th century CE, contains a short geographical and political description of the regions and the medieval feudal states that lied between Kaduthuruthy and Thiruvananthapuram. It contains details about the medieval kingdoms of Thekkumkur (1102–1749) and Vadakkumkur (1102–1750) those together constitute the modern district of Kottayam.

The writings and the records of the Portuguese as well as the Dutch, who visited and interfered in the political affairs of the district after the Age of Discovery (1498 CE), such as the Hortus Malabaricus, contain significant information about the geographical and the political conditions of the region during the late medieval period.

==== The Chera Perumals of Mahodayapuram (800 – 1102 CE) ====
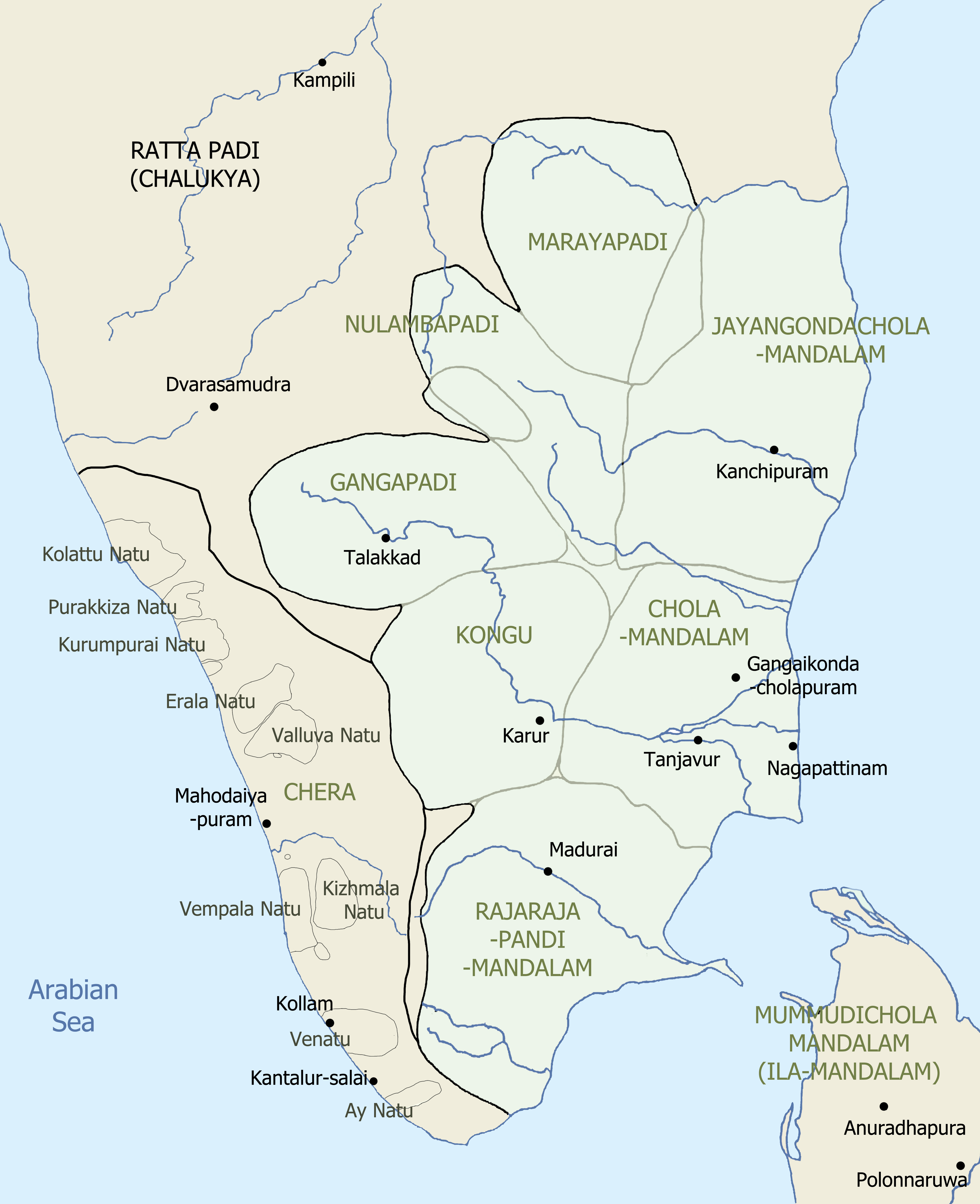
Kerala during 11th century CE (the region which is marked as Chera)

The area included in the modern-day district of Kottayam was part of three Nadus (provinces) during the period of the Chera Perumals of Mahodayapuram (800–1102 CE) for nearly three centuries. The region around the city of Kottayam was known as Munjunadu, while the Vaikom-Meenachil region, which lies to the north of Munjunadu was included in a province called Vempolinadu (known as Bimbali Desam in Sanskrit). The third province was the Nantuzhainadu which constitutes the modern-day Taluks of Changanassery and Thiruvalla. This period saw the decline of Buddhism and Jainism, which were once prominent in the region, along with the growth of Hinduism characterised by a large-scale migration of the Nambudiri Brahmins into the region.

The territory of the Chera Perumals of Mahodayapuram disintegrated into several small feudal states by early 12th century CE as a result of the continuous war that occurred between the Chera Perumals and the Medieval Cholas throughout the 11th century CE.

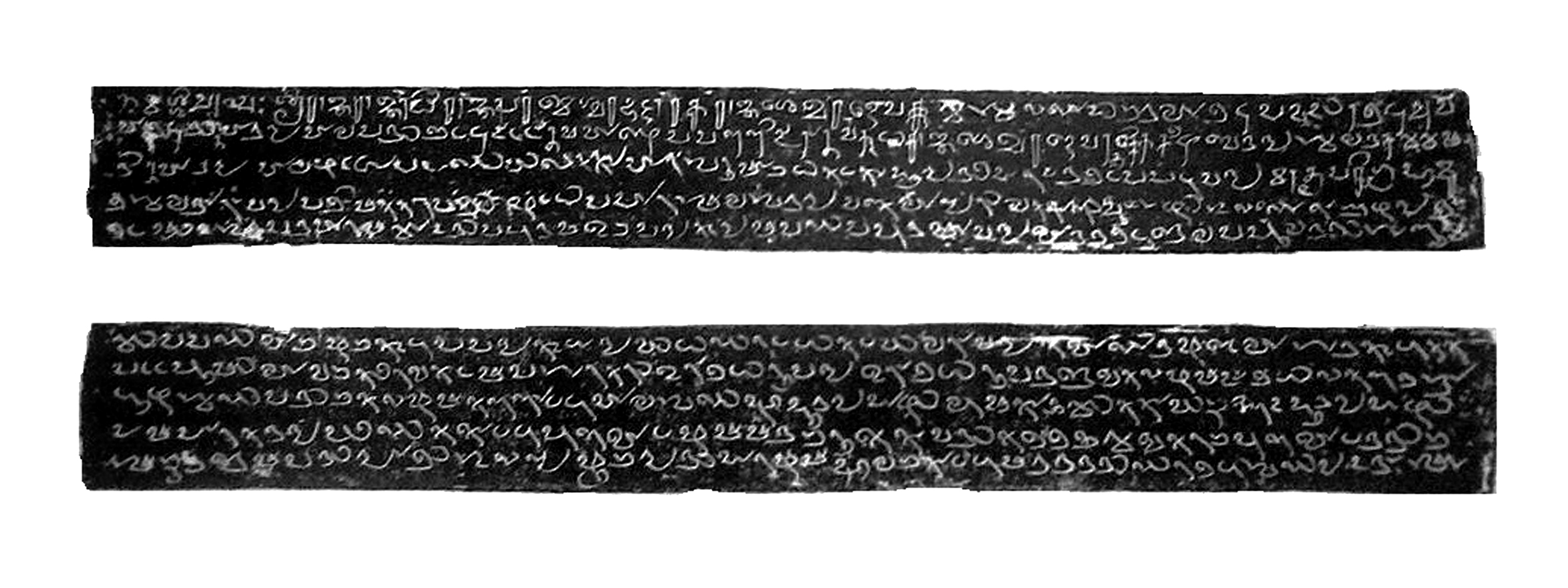
The Vazhappally copper plate (882/883 CE) written in Old Malayalam, found near Changanassery.

The Vazhappally copper plate (c. 882/83 CE) is a copper plate inscription written in Old Malayalam language that dates back to the 9th century CE found at Vazhappally in Kottayam district. Recent scholarship puts the date of the plate in c. 882/83 CE. The inscription is engraved on a single copper plate (with five lines on both sides) in an early form of the Old Malayalam language in Vatteluttu script with some Grantha characters. The contents of the plate are incomplete. The inscription was discovered by V. Srinivasa Sastri from Thalamana Illam near Changanassery. The plate is owned by Muvidathu Madom, Thiruvalla. The record is dated to the twelfth regnal year of Chera Perumal king Rama Rajasekhara (882/83 CE).

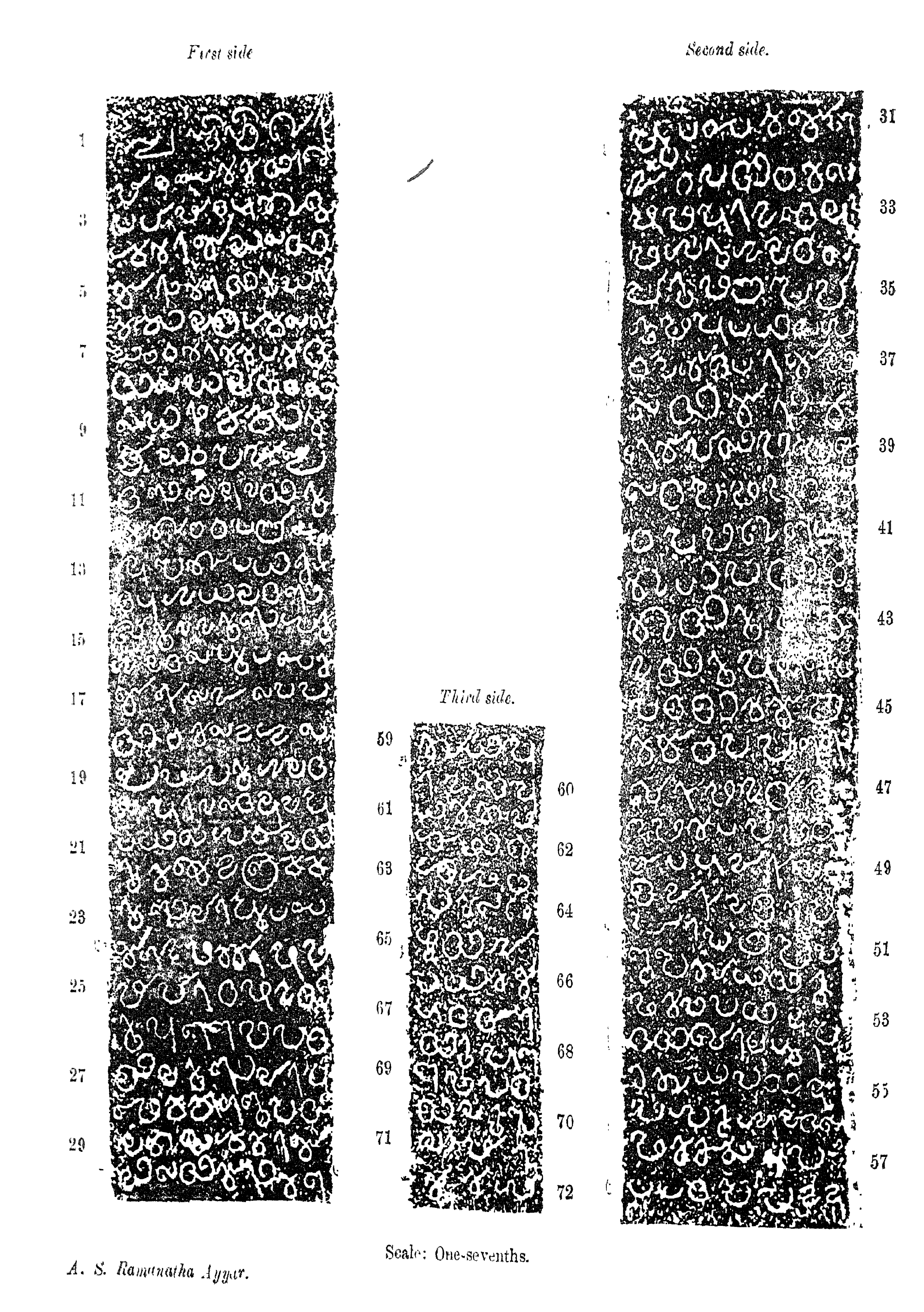
The Perunna inscription (1099 CE) of Rama Kulasekhara written in Old Malayalam, found near Changanassery.

Inscriptions related to Rama Kulasekhara (1089–1123 CE) of Chera Perumal dynasty can be found at Perunna near Changanassery. The Perunna inscription dates back to the year 1099 CE (the 10th regional year of Rama Kulasekhara).

==== Thekkumkur dynasty (1102–1749 CE) ====
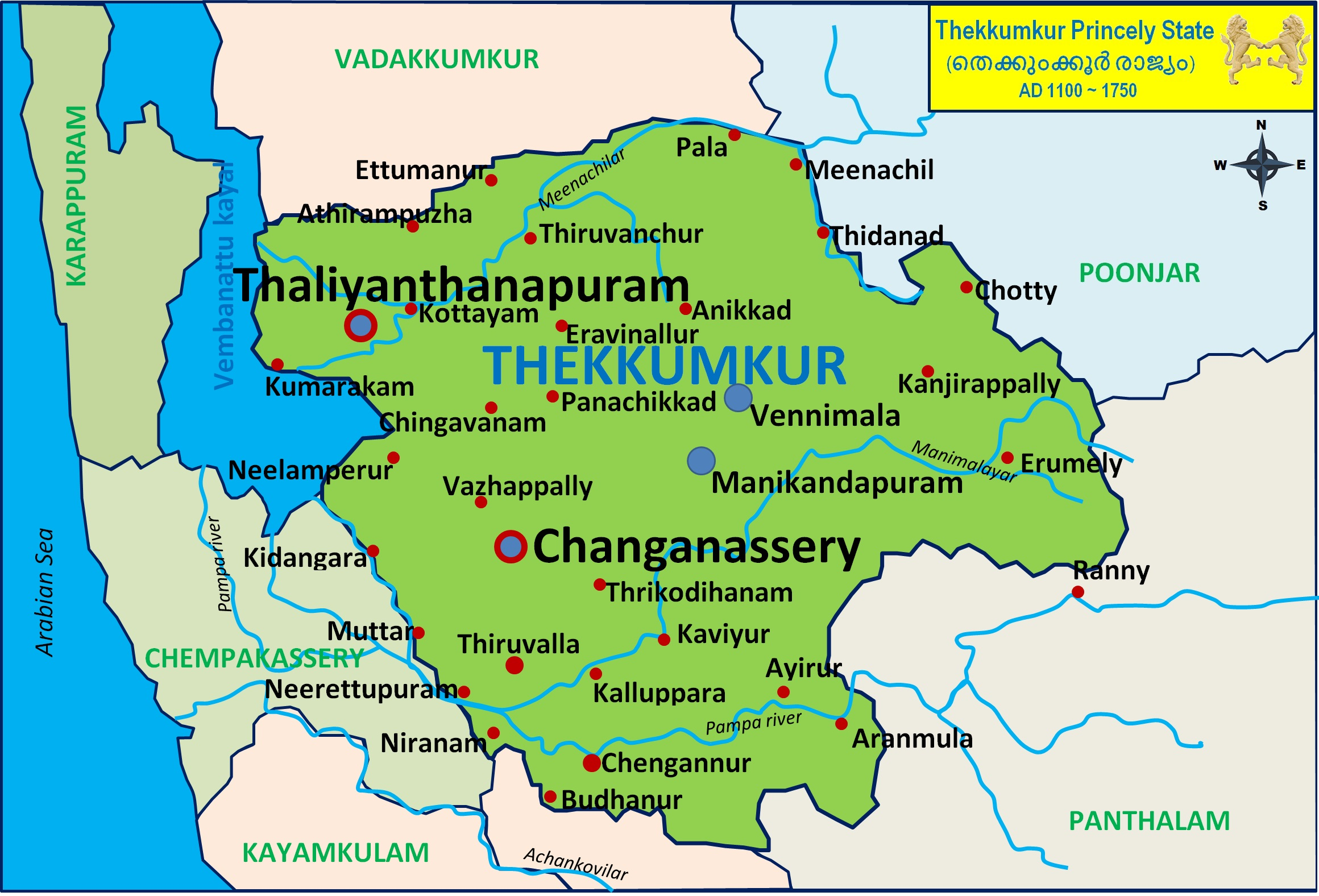
A political map of the Kingdom of Thekkumkur (1102–1749)

The province Vempolinadu (Bimbali Desam) of the Chera Perumals of Mahodayapuram attained political autonomy in 1102 CE following the Chera-Chola wars of the 11th century CE. The Vempolinadu royal family got evolved into two independent branches by the 12th century CE – the southern branch among them later came to be known as the kingdom of Thekkumkur. It included the modern-day Taluks of Changanassery, Kanjirappally, Kottayam, and Thiruvalla. The kings of the Thekkumkur dynasty are described by the titles Bimbaleeshas and Manikandas in the Sanskrit literary works. Vennimala and Manikandapuram were the early headquarters of the Thekkumkur dynasty. Later it was transferred to Thazhathangady near the town of Kottayam. Thazhathangady is one of the places in Kerala where a church, a mosque, and a Hindu temple co-exist together, which points out the religious harmony that existed under the Thekkumkur Rajas. At times, the town of Changanassery acted as headquarters of the Thekkumkur dynasty.

The Thekkumkur Rajas were vassals to the Kingdom of Cochin until the mid-18th century CE. Thekkumkur Rajas also allied with the Kingdom of Cochin and the Kingdom of Odanad (Kayamkulam) against the military invasions of the kingdom of Travancore into its northern kingdoms that occurred during the 1740s. As a result, Anizham Thirunal Marthanda Varma, the architect of the modern Travancore, attacked and annexed the kingdom of Thekkumkur into Travancore in 1749 during the Battle of Changanassery, after his annexation of Kayamkulam in 1746. The Thekkumkur king took refuge in the kingdom of the Zamorin of Calicut following his defeat in the battle.

==== Vadakkumkur dynasty (1102–1750 CE) ====
Vadakkumkur was the northern branch of the erstwhile province of Vempolinadu which attained political autonomy in 1102 CE after the collapse of the Chera Perumals of Mahodayapuram. The rulers of this dynasty were also known by the titles Bimbaleeshas and Manikandas in the contemporary Sanskrit works just like their Thekkumkur counterparts. The kingdom of Vadakkumkur included the modern-day Taluks of Ettumanoor and Vaikom along with a portion of the Meenachil Taluk. Kaduthuruthy was the earlier headquarters of the Vadakkumkur dynasty which was later transferred into Vaikom. Vadakkumkur was a vassal state of the Kingdom of Cochin until 1750.

The Portuguese explorers described Vadakkumkur as "The Pepper country" due to the availability and high scale production of good quality pepper there during the 16th century CE. The Dutch Malabar who became an influential power in the territory of Vadakkumkur during the 17th century CE and the first half of the 18th century CE had a trade centre at Vechoor (in Vaikom taluk) in Vadakkumkur. The Kingdom of Kizhmalanadu (1102–1600), which had included the modern-day Taluks of Muvattupuzha and Thodupuzha with its headquarters at Karikode near Thodupuzha, merged with the kingdom of Vadakkumkur around 1600 CE.

Vadakkumkur Raja was also a part of the combined military alliance formed by the kingdoms of Odanad (Kayamkulam), Thekkumkur, and Cochin against the expansion of Travancore into the northern territories. As a result, Anizham Thirunal Marthanda Varma, the architect of the modern Travancore, attacked and annexed Vadakkumkur in 1750. The Vadakkumkur Raja sought asylum in the kingdom of the Zamorin of Calicut. Later he returned back into Travancore.

==== Poonjar dynasty (1160–1750 CE) ====
In 1157 CE, Kulothunga Chola, who belonged to the lineage of the Medieval Cholas, entered into a war with Manavikrama Kulasekhara Perumal, who belonged to the Pandya dynasty of Madurai. Upon the failure in the battle, Manavikrama appointed his brother Maravarman Sreevallabha as the monarch of the Pandya dynasty and left Madurai with his family and some of his trusted servants. Manavikrama crossed the Western Ghats and sought political asylum in Kerala. Manavikrama purchased a vast tract of land bordering the Pandyan territories, from the ruler of Thekkumkur which comprised the Meenachil taluk the regions of Poonjar, Erattupeta, Pala, Patthanamthitta, Thodupuzha, etc. along with the High Range region of modern-day Idukki district in 1160 CE, which originally belonged to the Thekkumkur Rajas. This incident commenced the beginning of the Poonjar dynasty. They were a sovereign state. Though disputed, the territory of Poonjar was claimed by the Kingdom of Travancore in 1899 AD. Travancore claimed that the sovereignty reverted to them following the annexation of the principalities of Thekkumkur and Vadakkumkur in 1749–1750. The land ownership was not disputed.

The Kannan Devan Hills on the High Range region were given on lease on 11 July 1877 by the ruler of the Poonjar dynasty to John Daniel Munroe from London and for tea plantations. The land and the plantations were later resumed by the Government of Kerala through the Kannan Devan Hills (Resumption Of Lands) Act, 1971. However, the act only addressed the issue of sovereignty which was taken over by the State of Kerala with the accession of Travancore to the Union of India. The ownership of the Kannan Devan plantation (125000 acres)leased to John Monroe, and subsequently transferred to Tata Finlay, and finally to Tata Tea was not relinquished by the Poonjar royal family. This was established by a court challenge to the status, which was resolved by a Kerala High Court order in the early 1990s. The order was in favor of the Poonjar royal family establishing ownership. The lease terms are currently being fulfilled with regards to lease payments as per the original deed.

=== Progress and Social Reformation during the Travancore era (1750–1947) ===
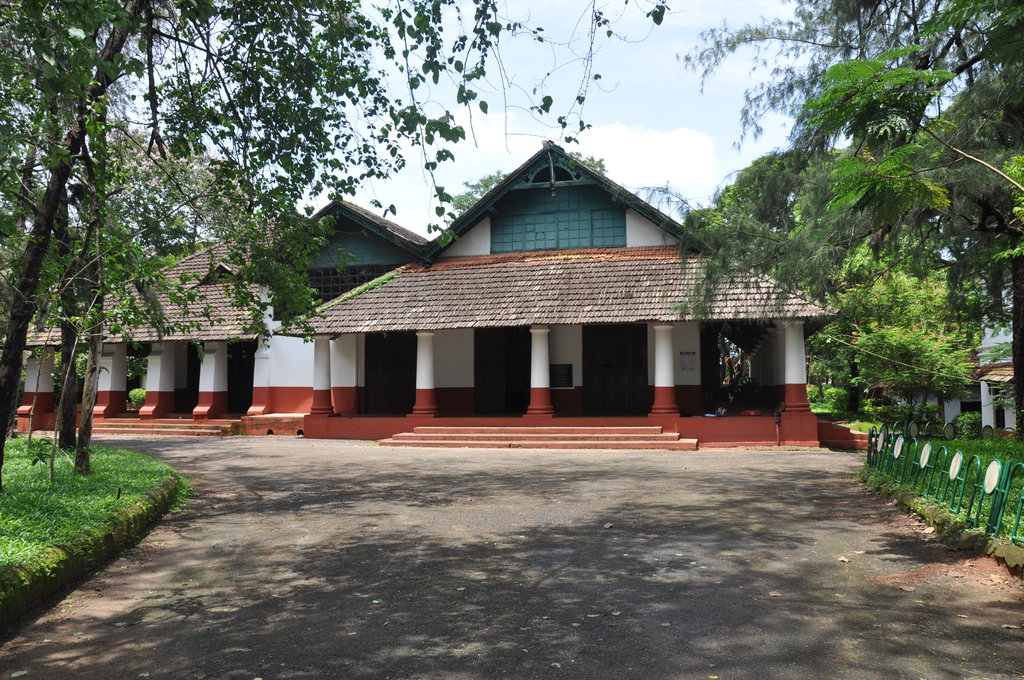
The CMS College Kottayam, established in 1815, was the first Western model institute of higher education in India.

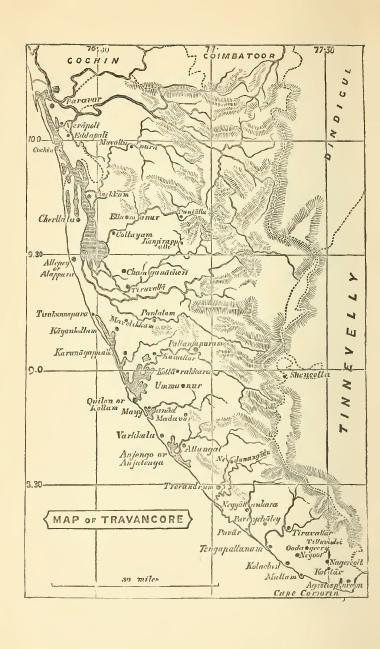
A map of the British princely state of Travancore published in 1871

Entire portion of the modern-day district of Kottayam became part of the erstwhile British princely state of Travancore by 1750 CE. This era marked considerable progress and social reformation in all spheres.

The Church Mission Society press at Kottayam was established in 1821 by Rev. Benjamin Baily, a British missionary, as the first printing press in Kerala. They had also established the CMS College Kottayam in 1815 as the first Western style institute of higher education in India. The region progressed much in its literacy rate by the end of the 19th century CE. It became one of the most literate regions in the British Indian Empire by 1860. Due to its remarkable progress in the fields of literacy, education, and printing, many early newspapers and magazines in Malayalam such as Deepika (1887) and Malayala Manorama (1888) were established in Kottayam.

The same period also saw the commencement of Kerala reformation movement with an aim to eradicate the Untouchability, inequality, and the irrational practices existed in the Kerala society for many centuries which ultimately led to the movements like the Vaikom Satyagraha (1924). Kottayam has been involved in a number of political movements, including the 'Malayali Memorial' movement. The goal of the movement was to seek more representation for Malayalis in the Travancore civil service irrespective of their caste and religion.

Vaikom Satyagraha, a protest against caste discrimination, took place in Kottayam district in 1924. The district also participated in the protests for responsible government in Travancore, which ended with the overthrow of Sir C. P. Ramaswami Iyer, who was the Divan of the British princely state of Travancore in 1947.

During the Travancorean administration, the British princely state of Travancore was divided into four revenue divisions- the Northern division headquartered at Kottayam, the Central division headquartered at Kollam, the Southern division headquartered at Thiruvananthapuram, and the High Range division with its headquarters at Devikulam.

Kottayam was the headquarters of the northernmost revenue division in Travancore which included the Taluks of North Paravur, Kunnathunad, Muvattupuzha, Thodupuzha, Meenachil, Changanassery, Kottayam, Vaikom, and Cherthala in 1931.

=== Post-independence (1947–present) ===
At the time of the integration of the state of Travancore and Cochin into the state of Travancore-Cochin in 1949 following the integration of the British Princely states of Travancore and Cochin into the Dominion of India, the erstwhile revenue divisions were reorganised into districts and the Divan Peshkars gave way to district collectors, paving the way for the birth of the Kottayam district on 1 July 1949.

The erstwhile Kingdom of Cochin was reorganized into Thrissur district and Taluks of North Paravur and Kunnathunad were transferred to that district. Similarly the Cherthala Taluk was transferred into the newly formed Kollam district on 1 July 1949. The High Range division of the erstwhile Travancore was merged with the remaining Taluks of the erstwhile Kottayam division to form the Kottayam district as a part of the inauguration of the new Indian state of Travancore-Cochin on 1 July 1949. The new district of Kottayam at that time contained eight Taluks – Changanassery, Kottayam, Vaikom, Meenachil, Muvattupuzha, Thodupuzha, Devikulam, and Peerumede.

As a part of the formation of the new Indian state of Kerala according to the States Reorganisation Act, 1956, many jurisdictional changes were done in the district. Two new Taluks, namely Kanjirappally (from Changanassery and Thiruvalla) and Udumbanchola (from Devikulam and Peerumede) were carved out on 1 October 1956. After a month, a new Taluk called Kuttanad was carved out from Changanassery and Ambalappuzha. The Kuttanad Taluk was transferred into the newly formed Alappuzha district on 17 August 1957. The Taluks of Thodupuzha and Muvattupuzha were transferred into the newly formed Ernakulam district on 1 April 1958.

On 26 January 1972, the three High Range Taluks, namely Devikulam, Udumbanchola, and Peerumede, along with Thodupuzha from the Ernakulam district were separated from Kottayam district to form a new district called Idukki. The district of Kottayam took its current shape on 26 January 1972. Now it contains five Taluks- Changanassery, Kottayam, Vaikom, Meenachil, and Kanjirappally.

The municipality of Kottayam was declared as the first town in India to achieve 100% literacy in 1989. The Multidimensional Poverty Index prepared by NITI Aayog based on the National Family Health Survey 2015–16 declared Kottayam as the first Indian district to achieve zero multidimensional poverty rate.

== Climate ==
There are no distinct seasons in Kottayam, as it has a tropical climate like that of the rest of Kerala. Humidity is high and rises to about 90% during the rainy season. Kottayam gets rain from two monsoon seasons, the south-west monsoon and the north-east monsoon, and accumulates an average rainfall of around 3600 mm per year. The south-west monsoon starts in June and ends in September, and the north-east monsoon season is from October to November. Pre-monsoon rains from March to May are accompanied by thunder and lightning; the highest rainfall during this period in Kerala is received in Kottayam. December, January, and February are cooler, while March, April, and May are warmer. The highest temperature recorded in Kottayam was 38.5 °C on 6 April 1998, and the lowest was 15 °C on 13 December 2000.

The Kottayam district experienced intense red rainfall in 2001, during which the rain was colored red, yellow, green, and black.

== Tourism and wildlife ==
Kottayam has a network of rivers, backwaters, ancient religious places, and hill stations. Local tourist places include:

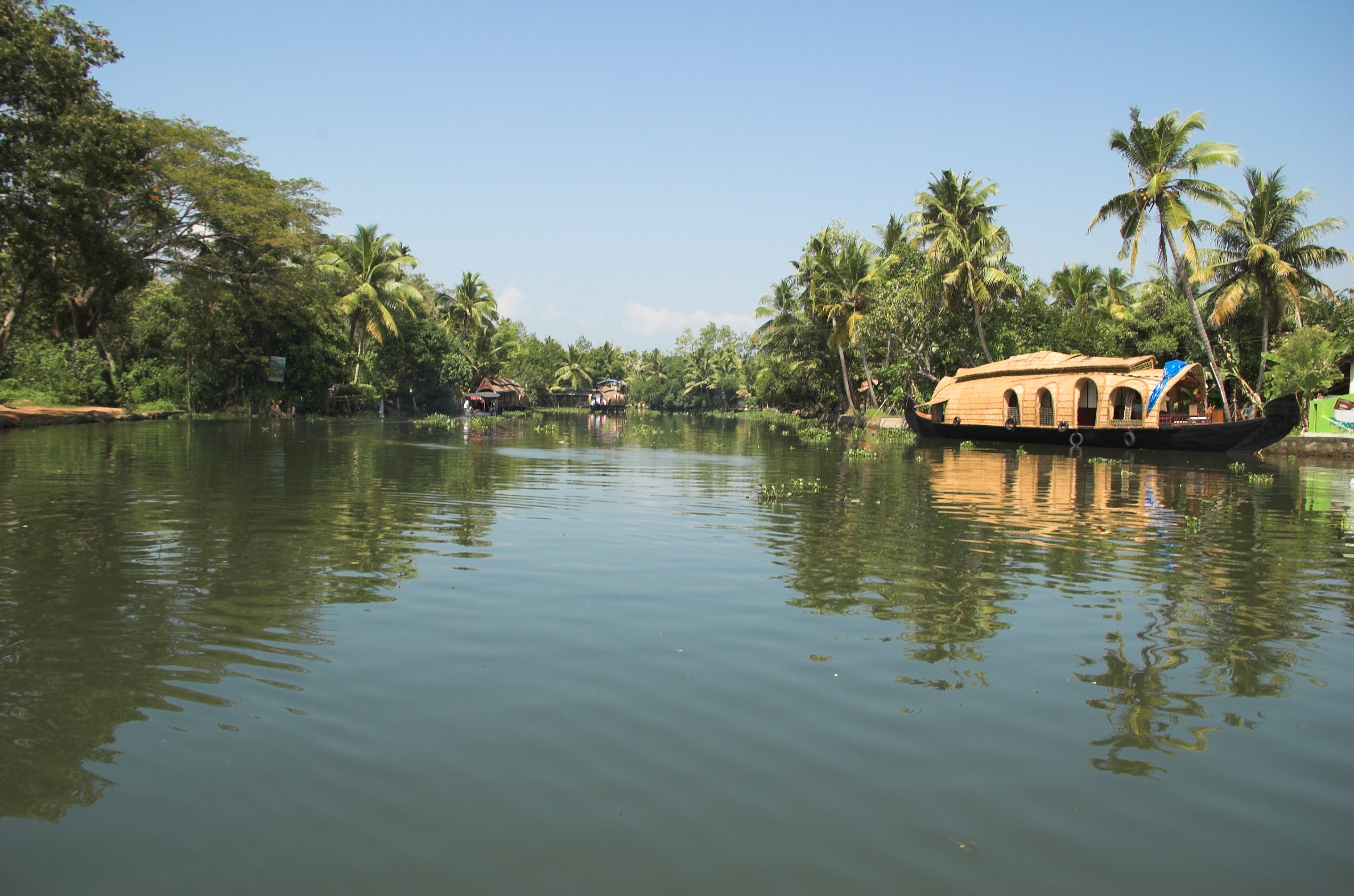
House Boat in Kumarakom

- Kumarakom, a tourist destination located near the city of Kottayam. It contains the Kumarakom Bird Sanctuary, which is known for migratory birds.
- Vembanad Lake is home to traditional cargo boats called Kettuvallams, which are modified into cruise boats and houseboats. Pathiramanal is a small island located in the Vembanad Lake, and is only accessible by boat.

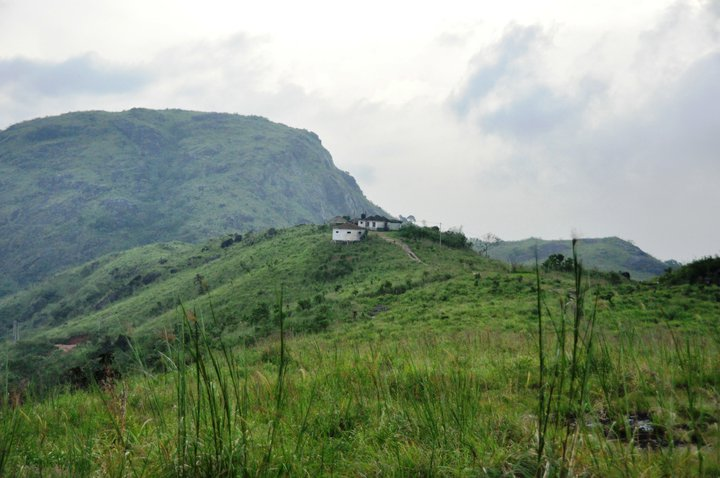
Ilaveezha Poonchira

- Ilaveezha Poonchira is a hill station in Kottayam.
- Vagamon is a hill station in Kerala. It is located primarily in the Idukki district, but includes the Meenachil taluk and Kanjirappally taluk as well.
- During the Onam festival in August and September, water boat races are conducted in Kottayam. The major one is the Nehru Trophy Boat Race. The Thazhathangadi boat race in Kummanam is over a century old.
- Vaikom, a historical town.
- Illickal Kallu, the highest point in the Kottayam district.

Malarikkal and Panachikkad in Kottayam is famous for Ambal fest.

== Transport ==
Kottayam is linked by major roads and rail to other prominent cities in Kerala, and also by waterways allowing for waterborne travel. The Kottayam Kumali, Ettumanoor-Ernakulam, Kottayam-Pathanamthitta, Thiruvalla-Kidangoor Central Kerala Bypass, and MC road are the major roads in the district. The nearest airport is the Cochin International Airport. SWTD operates ferry services from different parts of the Kottayam district. The ferry service from Vaikom to Thavanakkadavu in the Alappuzha district is the longest. India's first solar ferry service boat, 'Adhithya', operates from Vaikom.

== Administration ==
Kottayam city is the administrative headquarters of the Kottayam district. The district is divided into two revenue divisions- Kottayam and Pala.

=== Municipal towns ===
There are 6 municipal towns in the district. They are:

- Changanassery
- Erattupetta
- Ettumanoor
- Kottayam
- Pala
- Vaikom

=== Villages ===
- Achickal
- Kalathukadavu
- Karimpany
- Kuzhimattom
- Mammood
- Marangoly
- Panackapalam
- Villoonni

=== Legislative representation ===
There are three Lok Sabha constituencies in Kottayam district: Kottayam (6 assembly constituencies), Pathanamthitta (2 assembly constituencies, i.e., Kanjirappally and Poonjar) and Mavelikara (1 assembly constituency, i.e., Changanassery).

District	No.	Constituency	Name	Party	Alliance	Remarks
Kottayam	93	Pala	Mani C. Kappan	DCK	UDF	
Kottayam	94	Kaduthuruthy	Mons Joseph	KEC	UDF	Minister of Irrigation & Housing
Kottayam	95	Vaikom (SC)	K. Binimon	INC	UDF	
Kottayam	96	Ettumanoor	Nattakom Suresh	INC	UDF	
Kottayam	97	Kottayam	Thiruvanchoor Radhakrishnan	INC	UDF	Speaker
Kottayam	98	Puthuppally	Chandy Oommen	INC	UDF	
Kottayam	99	Changanassery	Vinu Job Kuzhimannil	KEC	UDF	
Kottayam	100	Kanjirappally	Rony K Baby	INC	UDF	
Kottayam	101	Poonjar	Sebastian M. J.	INC	UDF	

=== Taluks ===
The district is divided into two revenue divisions which together incorporate five Taluks within them.

- Taluks in the Kottayam Revenue Division are:

Changanassery	Kanjirappally	Kottayam

- Taluks in the Pala Revenue Division are:

Meenachil	Vaikom

=== Revenue villages ===
Kottayam district is divided into 100 revenue villages for the ease and decentralisation of its revenue administration. They are further incorporated into 5 taluks as eludicated below.

==== Changanassery Taluk ====
- Changanassery
- Chethipuzha
- Kangazha
- Karukachal
- Kurichy
- Madappally
- Nedumkunnam
- Payippad
- Thottackad
- Thrikkodithanam
- Vakathanam
- Vazhappally East
- Vazhappally West
- Vazhoor
- Vellavoor

==== Kanjirappally Taluk ====
- Cheruvally
- Chirakkadavu
- Edakkunnam
- Elamgulam
- Elikkulam
- Erumeli North
- Erumeli South
- Kanjirappally
- Koottickal
- Koovappally
- Koruthodu
- Manimala
- Mundakkayam

==== Kottayam Taluk ====
- Akalakunnam
- Anickad
- Arpookara
- Athirampuzha
- Ayarkunnam
- Aymanam
- Chengalam East
- Chengalam South
- Ettumanoor
- Kaipuzha
- Kooroppada
- Kottayam
- Kumarakom
- Manarcaud
- Meenadam
- Muttambalam
- Nattakom
- Onamthuruthu
- Pampady
- Panachikkad
- Peroor
- Perumbaikad
- Puthuppally
- Thiruvarppu
- Veloor
- Vijayapuram

==== Meenachil Taluk ====
- Bharananganam
- Elackad
- Erattupetta
- Kadanad
- Kadaplamattom
- Kanakkary
- Kidangoor
- Kondoor
- Kuravilangad
- Kurichithanam
- Lalam
- Meenachil
- Melukavu
- Monippally
- Moonilavu
- Poonjar
- Poonjar Nadubhagam
- Poonjar Thekkekara
- Thalanadu
- Poovarany
- Puliyannoor
- Ramapuram
- Thalappalam
- Teekoy
- Uzhavoor
- Vallichira
- Veliyannoor
- Vellilappally

==== Vaikom Taluk ====
- Chempu
- Kaduthuruthy
- Kallara
- Kothanalloor
- Kulasekharamangalam
- Manjoor
- Mulakulam
- Muttuchira
- Naduvile
- Njeezhoor
- Thalayazham
- Vadakkemuri
- Vadayar
- Vaikom
- Vechoor
- Velloor
- Udayanapuram
- T V Puram

== Major Towns ==
The major towns of the district include:

- Vaikom taluk: Vaikom, Kaduthuruthy, Kallara, Chempu, Njeezhoor, Vadakkemuri, Peruva
- Kottayam taluk: Kottayam, Pampady, Athirampuzha, Ettumanoor, Chingavanam, Ayarkunnam, Manarcaud, Puthupally,
- Changanasserry taluk: Changanassery, Karukachal, Vazhoor, Vakathanam
- Kanjirappally taluk: Kanjirappally, Manimala, Ponkunnam, Koottickal, Koruthodu, Erumeli, Mundakayam
- Meenachil taluk: Kuravilangad, Pala, Erattupetta, Ramapuram, Poonjar, Uzhavoor

== Economy ==
=== Agriculture ===
Kottayam has a mountainous terrain as well as low-lying areas very close to sea level. Depending on the location, different varieties of food and cash crops are cultivated. Rice is the principal crop extensively cultivated in low-lying regions like Vaikom and Upper Kuttanad. The district occupies third place in the production of rice in Kerala behind Palakkad and Alappuzha.

Although it is the staple food of the people, the area under cultivation is dwindling due to more lucrative cash crops such as rubber plantations for which Kottayam significantly contributes to the overall rubber production in India. Kottayam is India's largest rubber producer. Rubber trees provide a stable income for farmers and the climate is ideal for rubber plantations. Though the highlands are more suitable, cultivation has spread to almost all regions. Other crops cultivated include tapiocas, coconuts, peppers, and vegetables. To enhance rubber productivity, the government of India has set up a Rubber Board as well as a rubber research institute in Kottayam.

=== Industry ===
The district lacks refineries, ports, and an airport, which are needed for major industries.Aside from two public sector companies, Hindustan Newsprint at Velloor and Travancore Cements at Nattakom, industries in the district consist mostly of small and medium-size operations. These mainly include the publishing and processing of rubber or latex, and manufacturing of rubber-based products.

Confined mostly to the Vaikom area of the district is an industry of coir processing and making coir products. Consisting of more than twenty cooperatives, it employs around 20,000 people. In the hand-loom sector, eight cooperative societies employ 2,100 persons. The district's forests include varieties of softwood and other varieties of timber providing the raw material for several small enterprises in the production of plywood, packing cases, splints, veneers, and furniture.

The first printing press in Kerala, C.M.S. Press, was established in 1821 by Rev. Benjamin Bailey, a British missionary. Malayalam-English and English-Malayalam dictionaries were published in Kottayam in 1846 and 1847. The only cooperative society of writers, authors and publishers (SPCS) for publishing books and periodicals was established in 1945. Kottayam is home to a number of books and periodicals, and is the center of publishing business in the state.

Publishing houses like Malayala Manorama, Mathrubhumi publications, Labour India Publications Ltd, Mangalam Publications, Deepika, D. C. Books, V Publishers, Vidhyamitram, Kerala Kaumudi daily and Kerala Kaumudi Flash are also publishers in the district. The city of Kottayam hosts several book exhibitions every year.

== Demographics ==
Historical population
Year	Pop.	±% p.a.
1901	450,615	—
1911	488,040	+0.80%
1921	585,478	+1.84%
1931	775,069	+2.84%
1941	942,899	+1.98%
1951	1,132,478	+1.85%
1961	1,313,983	+1.50%
1971	1,539,030	+1.59%
1981	1,697,442	+0.98%
1991	1,828,271	+0.75%
2001	1,953,646	+0.67%
2011	1,974,551	+0.11%

According to the 2011 census Kottayam district has a population of 1,974,551, roughly equal to the nation of Slovenia or the US state of New Mexico. This gives it a ranking of 234th in India (out of a total of 640). The district has a population density of 896 inhabitants per square kilometre (2,320/sq mi). Its population growth rate over the decade 2001–11 was 1.32%. Kottayam has a sex ratio of 1040 females for every 1000 males, and a literacy rate of 97.21%, the highest in the state and 4th highest in India. 28.63% of the population lives in urban areas. Scheduled Castes and Scheduled Tribes make up 7.79% and 1.11% of the population respectively.

Malayalam is the predominant language, spoken by 98.88% of the population. Tamil is spoken by a small minority in urban areas.

=== Religion ===
Religions in Kottayam district (2011)
Religion	Percent
Hinduism	49.81%
Christianity	43.48%
Islam	6.41%
Other or not stated	0.30%

According to the 2011 Indian Census, Hinduism (49.81%) is the largest religion in Kottayam, with a significant Christian minority (43.48%). Syro-Malabar, Orthodox, Jacobites, CSI and Pentecostals are the main Christian sects. The Muslim population constitutes 6.41% of the district.

Religions in Kottayam (%)
Talukas	Hindus	Christians	Muslims	Others
Meenachil	39.91	52.54	7.36	0.19
Vaikom	67.62	28.72	3.41	0.25
Kottayam	50.41	45.56	3.71	0.32
Changanassery	47.21	45.71	6.66	0.42
Kanjirappally	46.30	39.02	14.37	0.31

The three major religious communities in the Kottayam district are Hinduism, Christianity, and Islam. The Nair Service Society's headquarters are located in the district's town of Perunna, Changanassery. The Mannam memorial, created in memory of social reformer Mannathu Padmanabha Pillai, is also located there.

The headquarters of the Malankara Orthodox Syrian Church (Malankara Church/Indian Orthodox Church), is located in Devalokam, Kottayam. It is the official headquarters of the Malankara Metropolitan and the Catholicos of the East.

The Madhya Kerala Diocese of the Church of South India (CSI) has its headquarters in Kottayam.

The Knanaya Christian community (both the Catholic and Jacobite factions) also has its headquarters in Kottayam district.

The Thazhathangady Juma Mosque, which is one of the oldest Masjids in the country, is also located at Kottayam.

Kottayam, Thiruvalla, and Chengannur are the railway stations for pilgrims heading to the Hindu holy site of Sabarimala.

The pilgrim centers in Kottayam include a number of Hindu temples, Christian churches and Muslim mosques, including:

=== Hindu temples ===
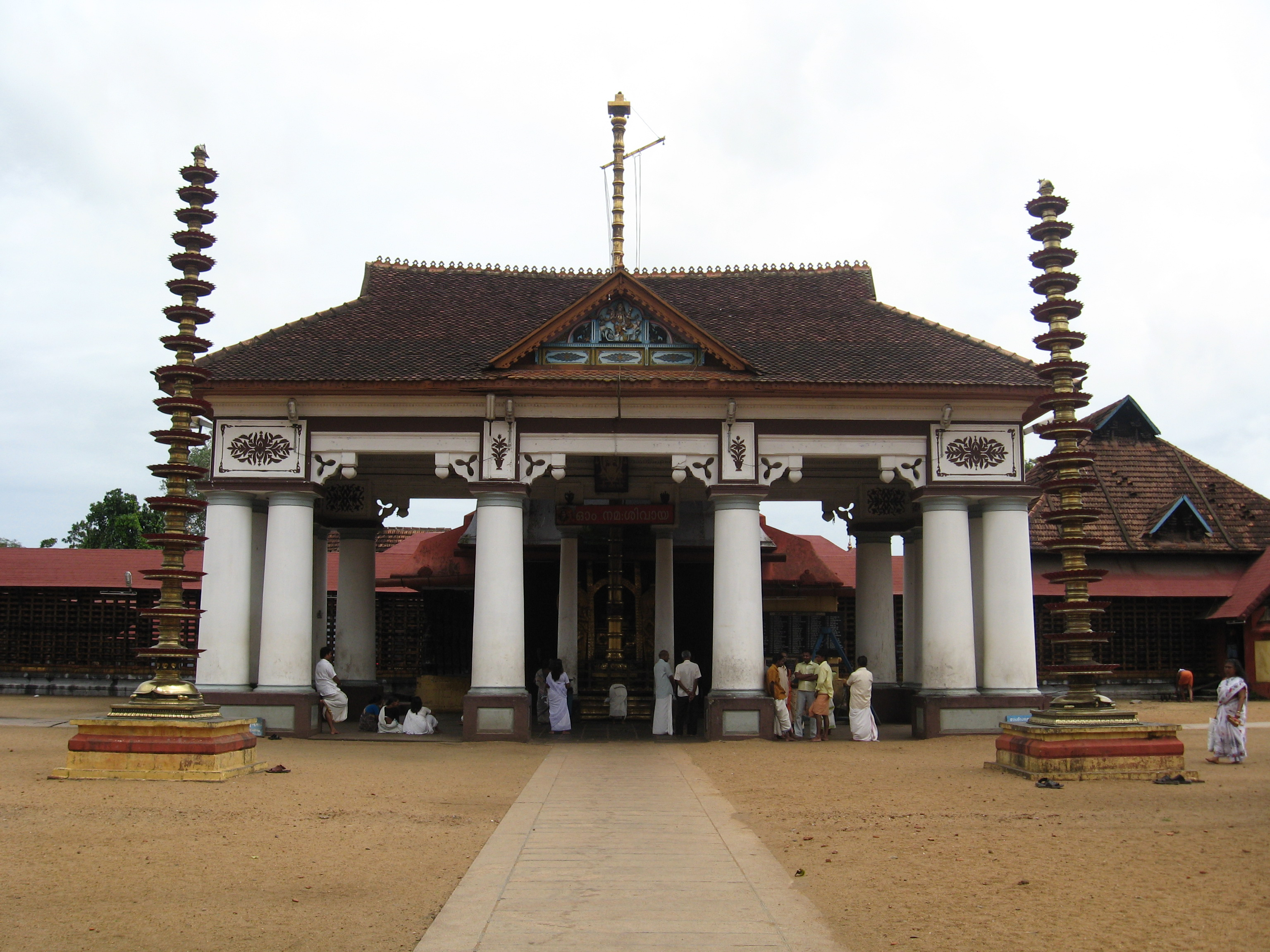
Vaikom temple is known as the Kasi of the South

- Thirunakkara Sree Mahadevar Temple – The temple is situated in the heart of Kottayam city and is built in the traditional architectural styles of Kerala. The temple is about 500 years old and was built by the Thekkumkoor Raja, and occupies about 4 acres of land.
- Thiruvambady Sreekrishna Swami Temple, Mukkoottuthara - The temple is located near the small town of Mukkoottuthara, 7 km from the historic Erumely on the Pampa route. From here, the distance to Sabarimala is only 40 km.
- Vaikom Sree Mahadeva Temple – It is known as the Kasi of the south. The Vaikath Ashtami is held in November and December. Vadakkumpurathupattu is held every 12 years to attract devotees.
- Kodungoor Devi Temple
- Ettumanoor Mahadevar Temple – Annual festival and Ezhunallath are held in this Shiva temple in Kumbham (February to March).
- Panachikkadu Dakshina Mookambilka Saraswathy Devi Temple
- Kumaranalloor Devi Temple – Known for Thrikarthika Deshavilakku. Navarathri and Meena Pooram are the other festivals celebrated at this temple.
- Adithyapuram Sun Temple – It is the only 'Adithya' (Hindu solar deity) shrine in the state.
- Erumely Sree Dharmasastha Temple – Pilgrims arrive here during Mandalakalam on their way to Sabarimala. Erumeli Pettathullal is a notable ritual.

=== Churches ===
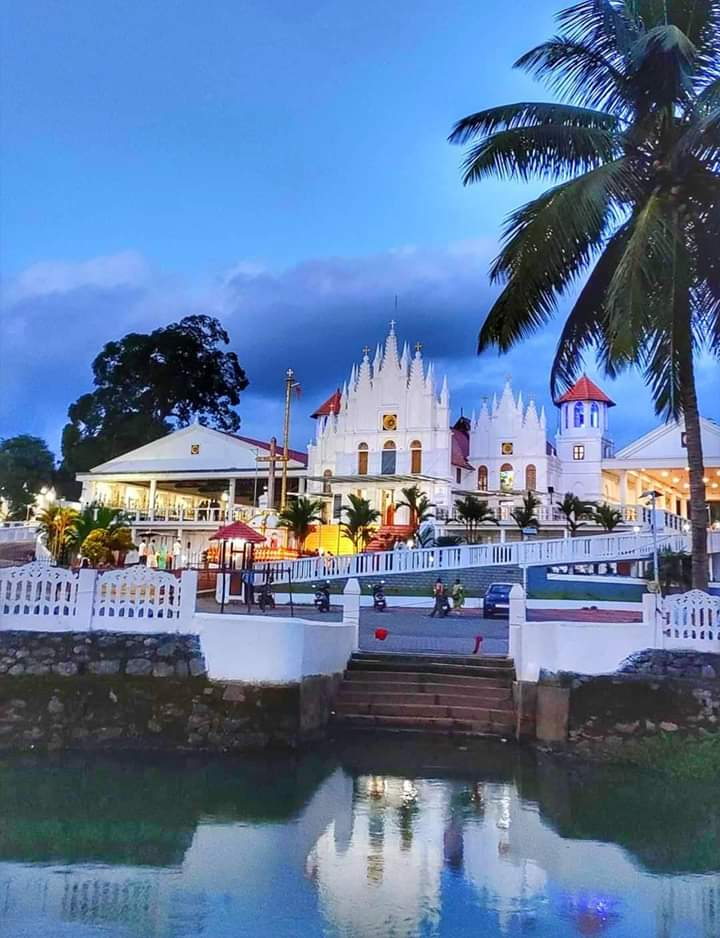
St. George Orthodox Church, Puthuppally

- St. George Orthodox Church, Puthuppally (Orthodox) – Georgian Pilgrim Centre (Founded AD 1557). Relics of St. George is kept here
- Pazhaya Seminary (Orthodox) – The remains of Saint Vattasseril Dionysius VI (15th Malankara Metropolitan) are kept here
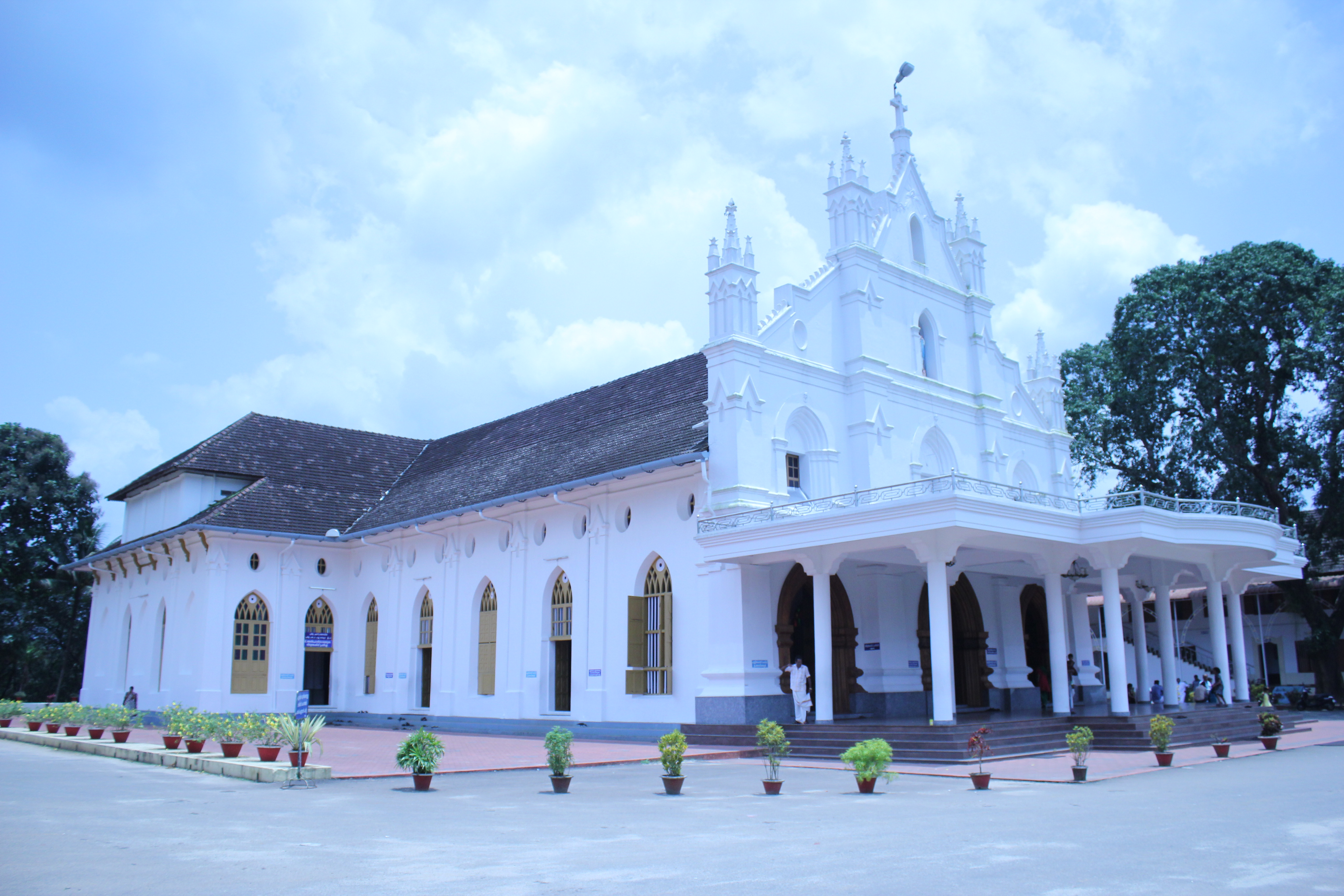
- Bharananganam Syro Malabar Catholic Church
  Bharananganam (Syro-Malabar Catholic) – The remains of Saint Alphonsa are kept here.
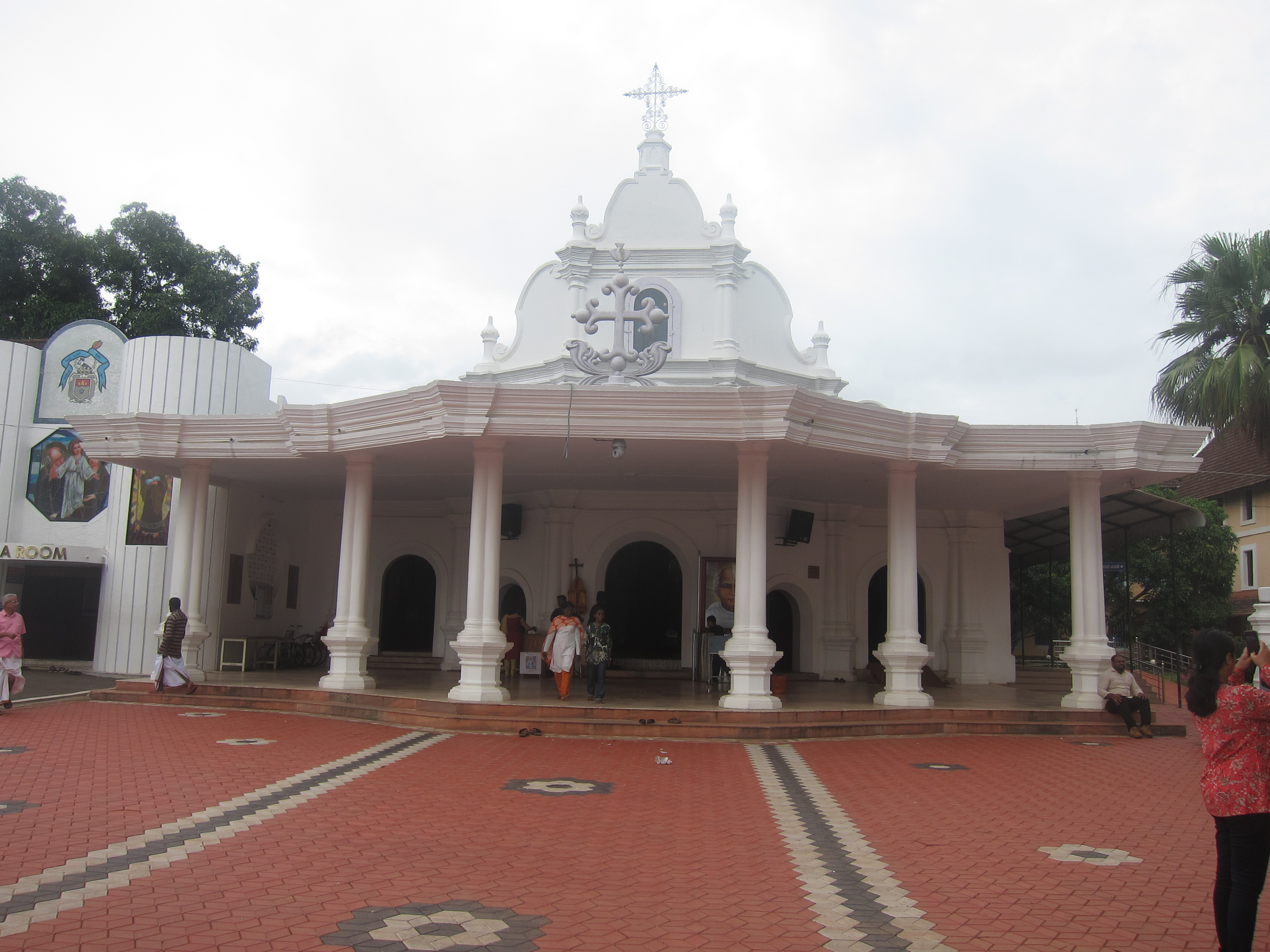
- St. Joseph Church Mannanam
  St. Joseph's Monastery Shrine, Mannanam (Syro-Malabar Catholic) – It was built by Kuriakose Elias Chavara. His remains are preserved here.
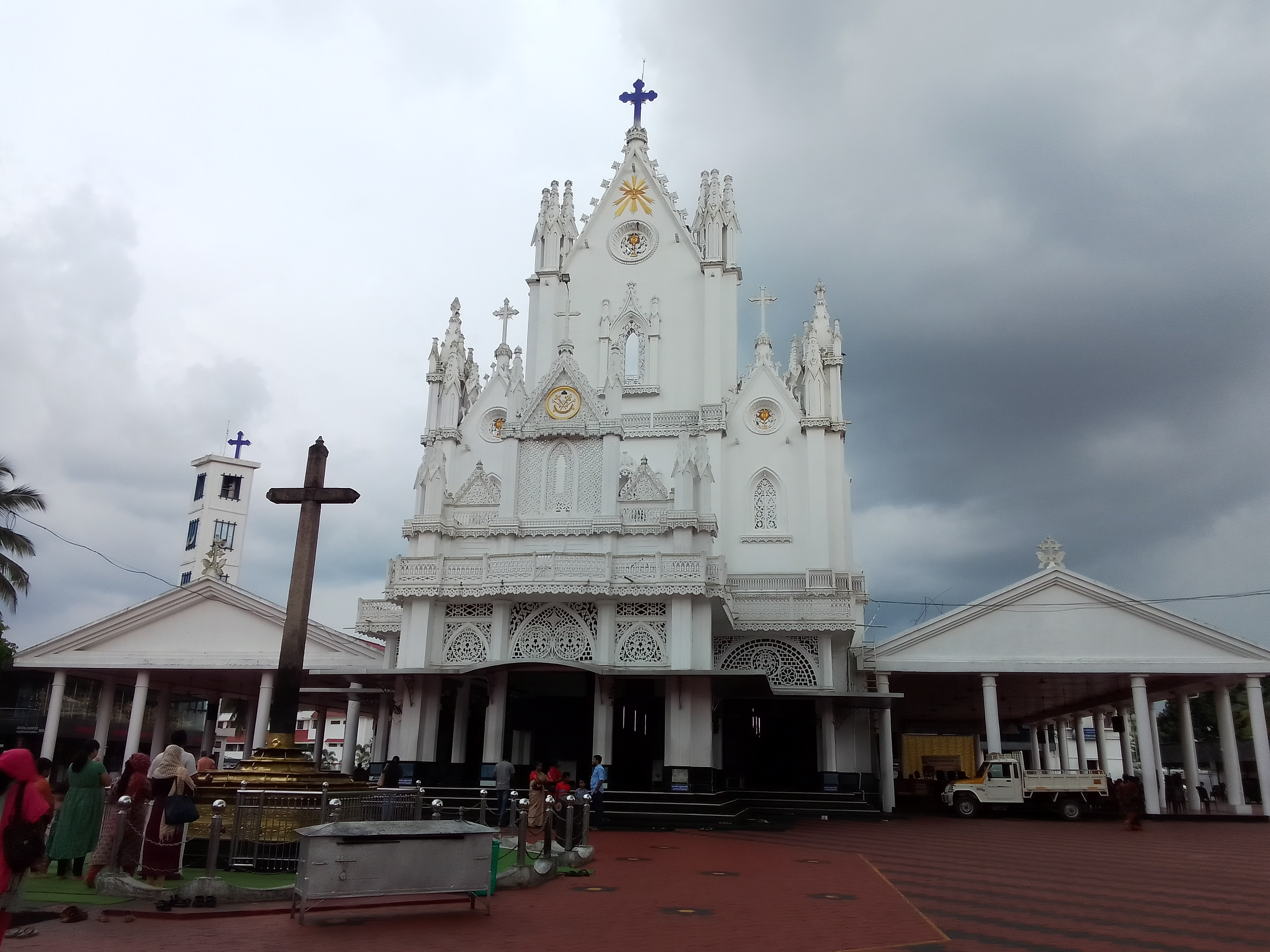
- Manarcad Jacobite Church
  St. Mary's Jacobite Syrian Cathedral, Manarcad (Jacobite Orthodox) – Its Ettunompu festivals/perunnals are notable.
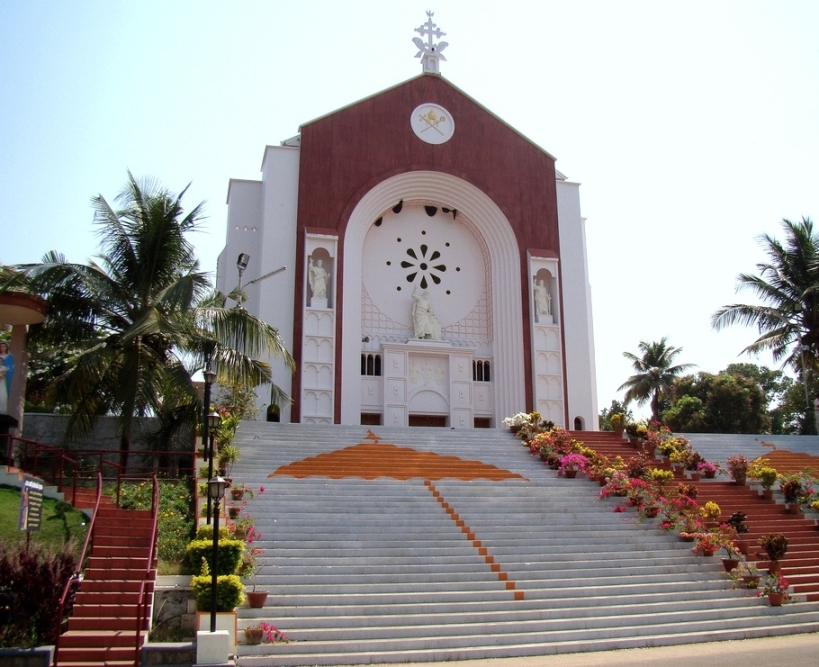
- St. Thomas Cathedral Pala
  St Thomas Cathedral of Pala – cathedral of the Syro-Malabar Diocese of Pala
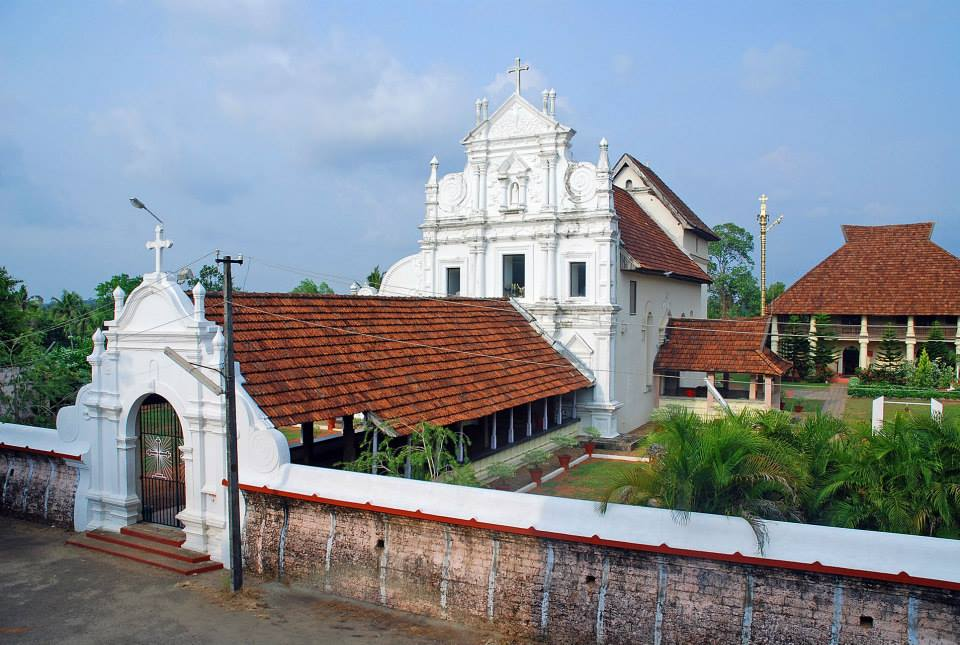
- St. Mary's Orthodox Church, Kottayam
  St. Mary's Orthodox Church, Kottayam —(Kottayam Cheriapalli) (Orthodox) – It was built in 1579 AD with a Kerala and Portuguese style.
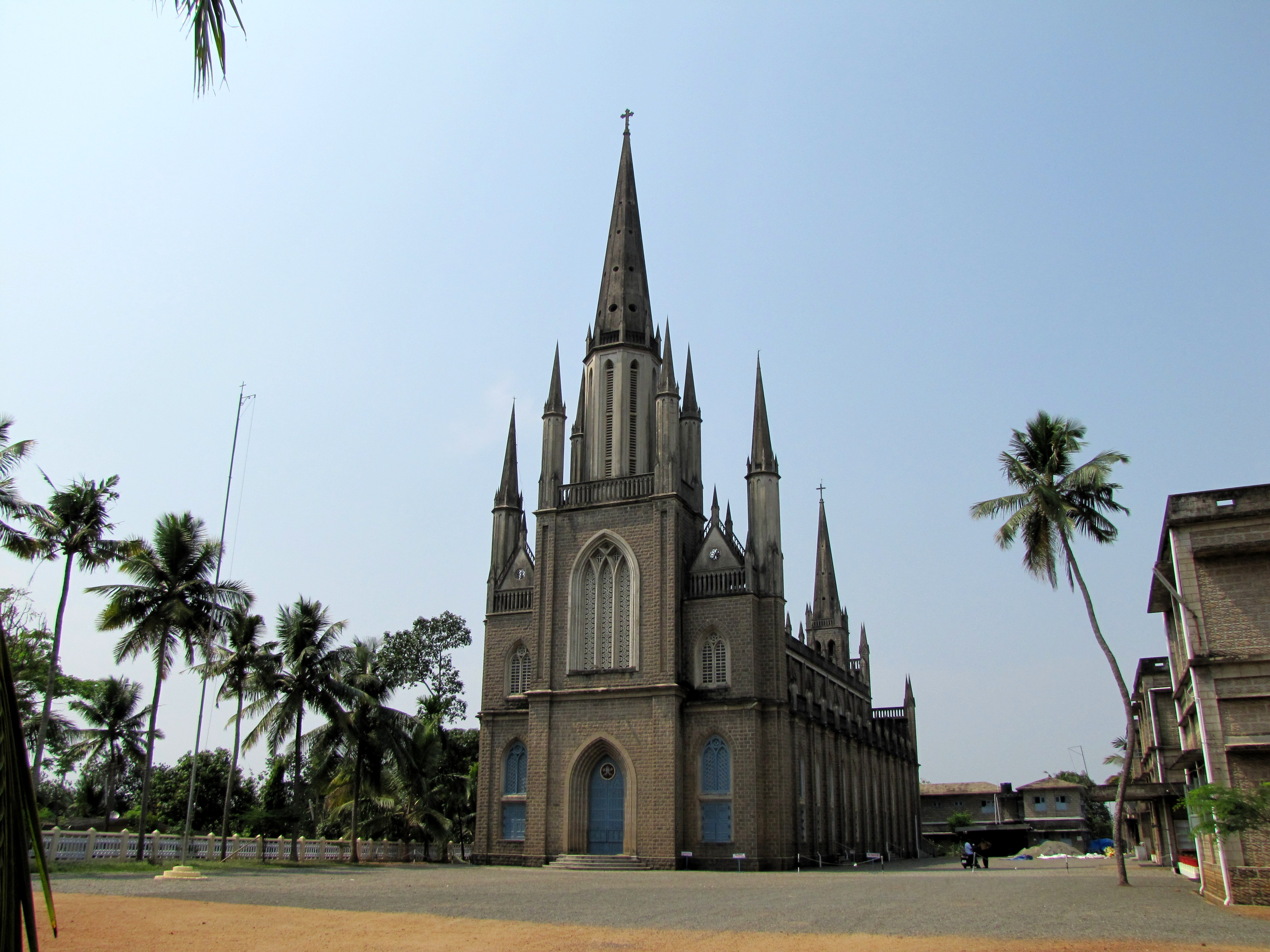
- Vimalagiri Cathedral Kottayam
  Vimalagiri Cathedral (Latin Catholic) – It was built in the Gothic Architectural style. Cathedral of the Latin Diocese of Vijayapuram
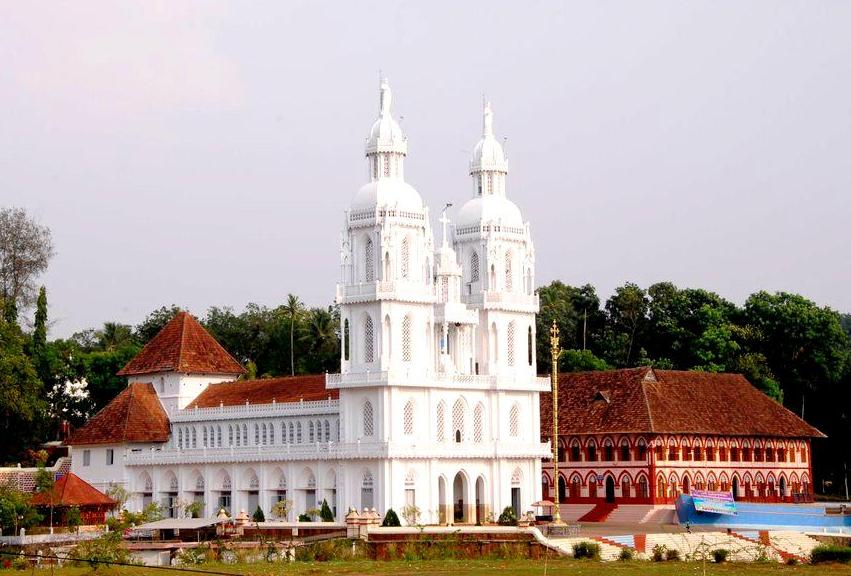
- Marth Mariam Syro Malabar Archdeacon Major Archiepiscopal Catholic Church, Kuravilangad
  Marth Mariam Syro-Malabar Church, Kuravilangad (Syro-Malabar Catholic) – 13 km north of Ettumanoor.
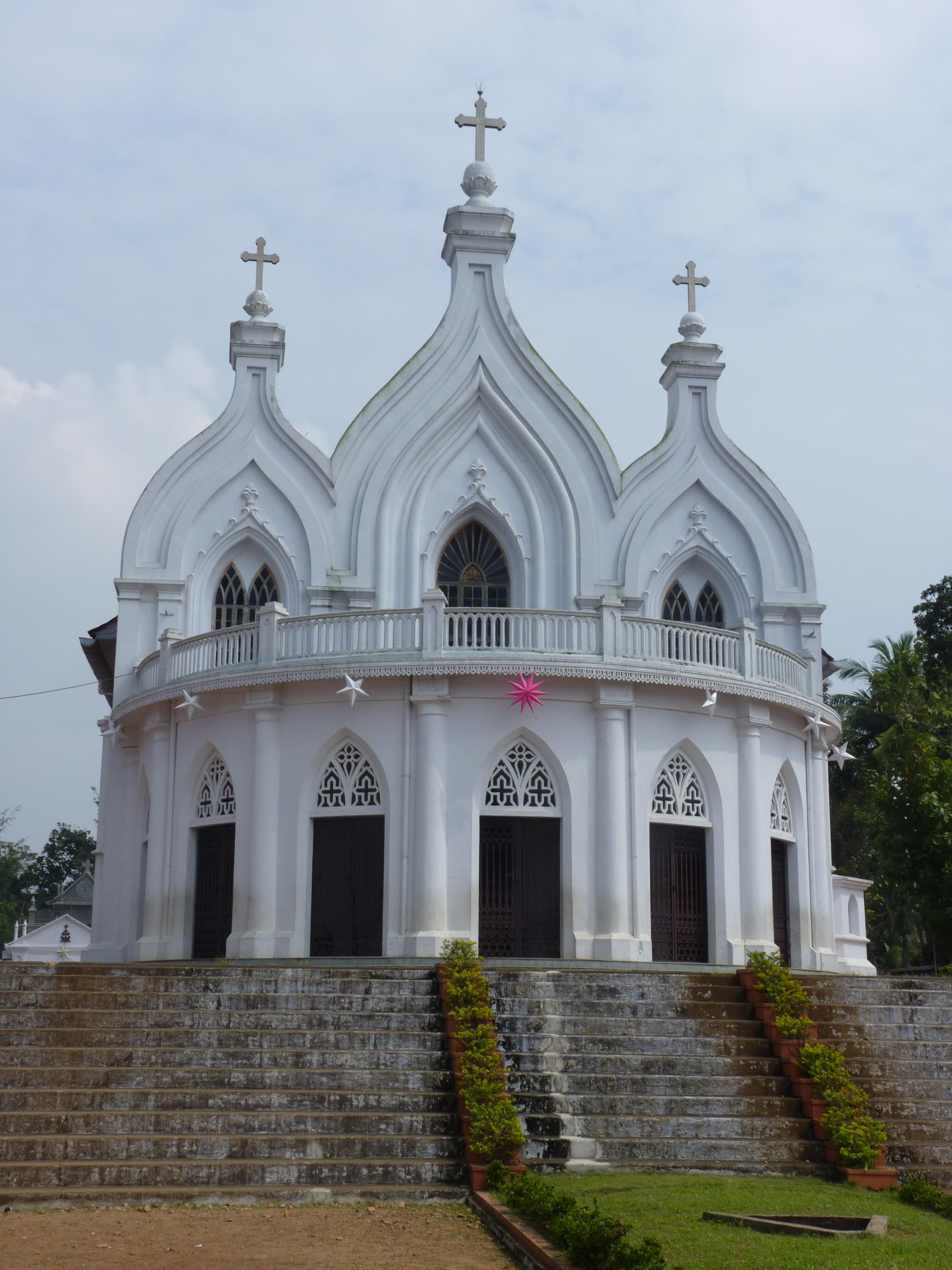
- St. Mary's Metropolitan Cathedral Church, Changanassery.
  St. Mary's Metropolitan Cathedral, Changanassery (Valiyapally) – cathedral of the Syro-Malabar Archdiocese of Changanassery
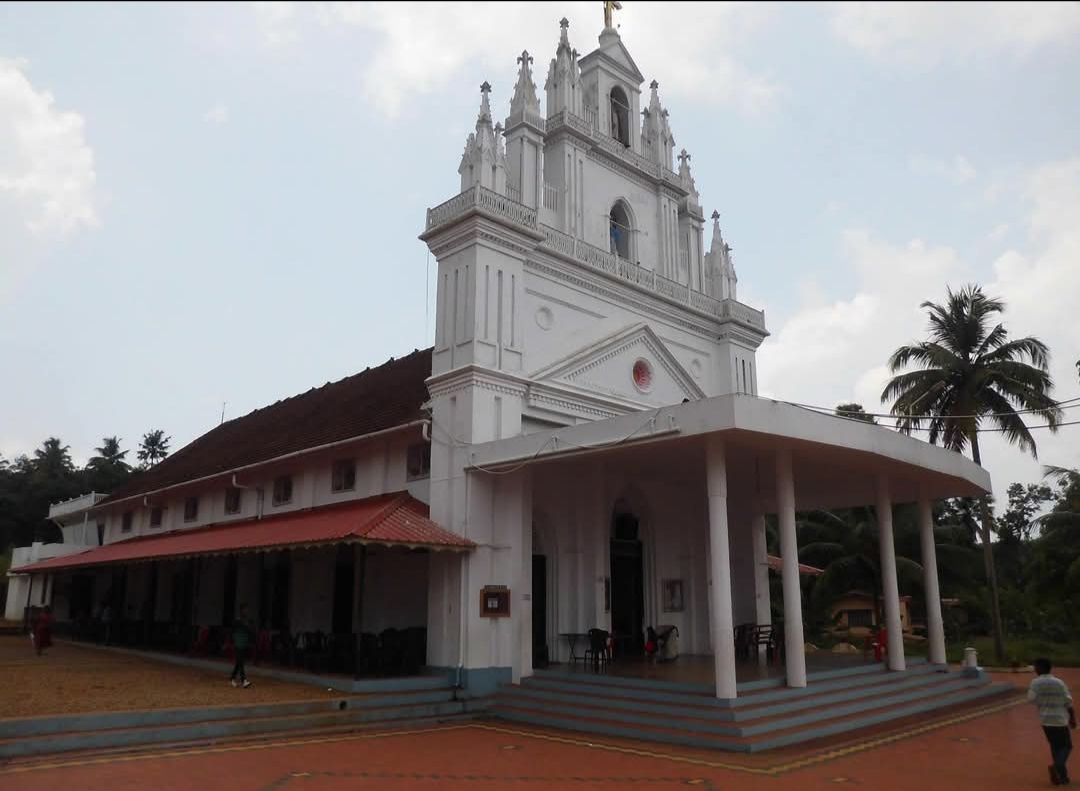
- St Mary's Church Koothrappally
  St. Mary's Syro Malabar Catholic Church, Koothrappally (Syro-Malabar Catholic) - It was built by the Christian leader, Palakunnel Marth Mariam Kathanar and is also buried here. Notable for its unique veneration of St. Maurus.

=== Mosques ===
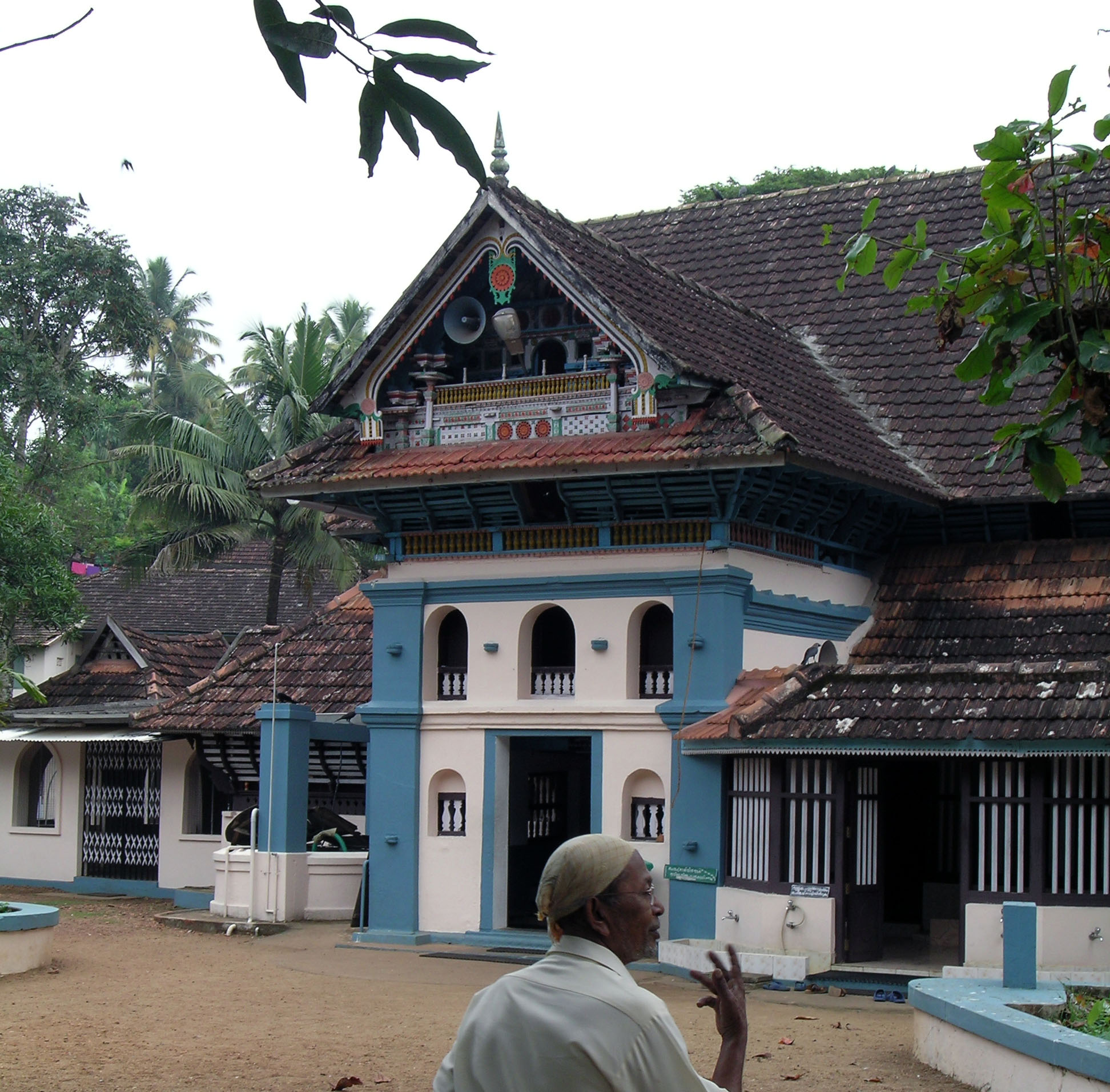
Thazhathangady Juma Mosque is one among the oldest mosques in India

- Thazhathangady Juma Mosque—One of the ancient mosques in India.
- Thangalppara in Kottayam—The mausoleum of Sheikh Fariduddin, and a Muslim pilgrim centre.

== Education ==
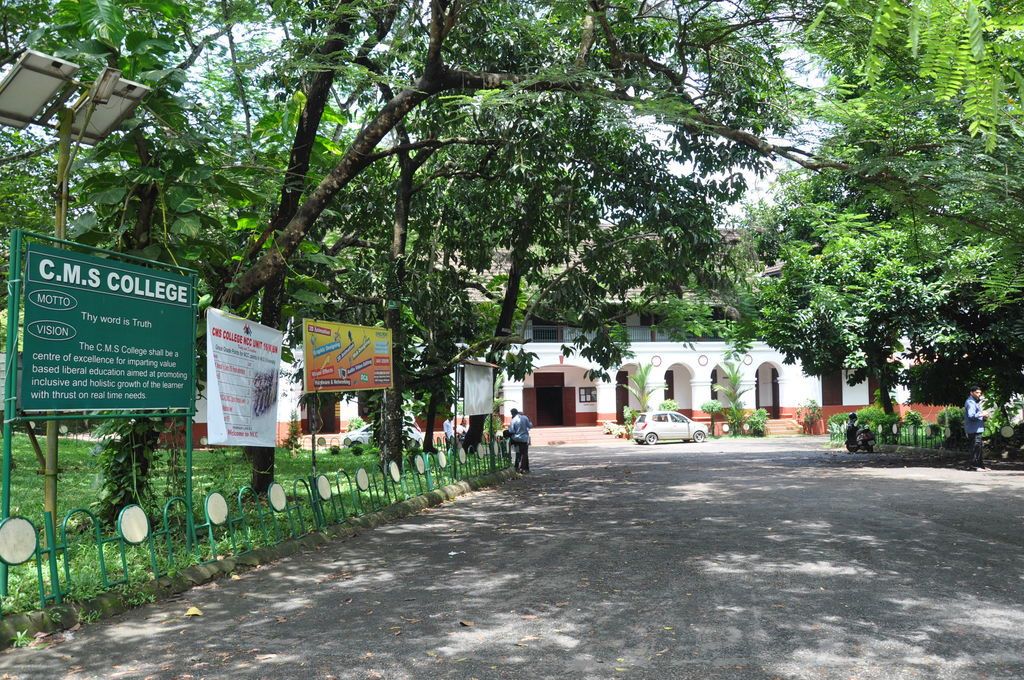
CMS College Kottayam

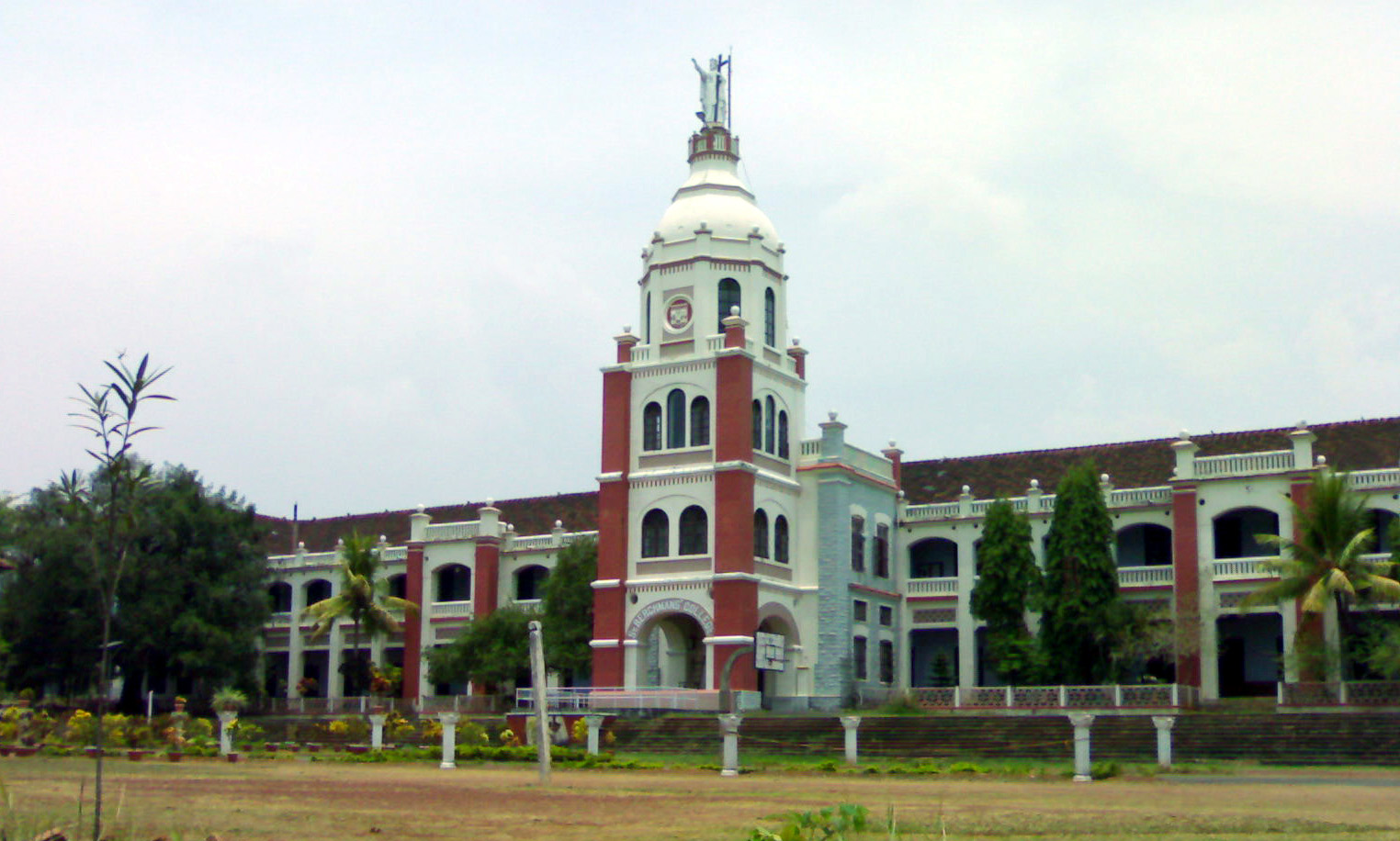
SB College Changanassery

In the 17th century, a Dutch school was started at Kottayam, which was short-lived. The first English school in Kerala, and the first college in India, was established in 1817 by the Church Missionary Society of England under the leadership of Col. John Munro, as CMS College. Later in 1891, the clergies of Catholic Church, under the leadership of Fr Charles Lavigne, established St Berchmans English High School, Changanassery, one of the first residential English High School in Central Travancore. On seeing a need for instituition for higher education in Kottayam - Malabar region, under the leadership of Venerable Mar Thomas Kurialacherry, Bishop of Archeparchy of Changanassery with help of Syro Malabar Catholic Church, established the famous SB College in Changanasserry in 1922. Today CMS College Kottayam and SB College Changanasserry stands as a landmark and has made a huge contribution to education in the district. Thus, Kottayam became India's first district with 100% literacy in 1989.

Notable educational institutions in the district include:-

- SB College Changanassery
- CMS College Kottayam
- Government Medical College, Kottayam
- Indian Institute of Information Technology, Kottayam(IIIT-K)
- Indian Institute of Mass Communication, Kottayam (IIMC-K)
- K. R. Narayanan National Institute of Visual Science and Arts
- Mahatma Gandhi University, Kerala.
- Rajiv Gandhi Institute of Technology, Kottayam (Government Engineering College)

== Notable people ==
- Joseph G Abraham, athlete
- Saint Alphonsa, a canonised saint
- Alummoodan, Malayalam actor
- Meenakshi Anoop, a child artist
- Anto Antony, Member of Parliament
- Babu Antony, actor
- Roshy Augustine, Politician
- Ponnamma Babu, Malayalam actress
- Mamitha Baiju, actress
- K. G. Balakrishnan, the first judge from the state of Kerala to become the Chief Justice of the Supreme Court
- Vaikom Muhammad Basheer, Malayalam writer
- Bhamaa, actress
- Chemmanam Chacko, Poet
- Oommen Chandy, the former Chief minister of Kerala
- Miya George, Malayalam actress
- P. C. George, Politician
- Ulloor S. Parameswara Iyer, a Malayalam writer
- V. N. Janaki, a Tamil actress and politician
- Janardhanan, actor in India
- Manoj K. Jayan, a Malayalam actor
- Jayaraj, director
- Geethu Anna Jose, basketball player
- Mar James Kalacherry, Archbishop
- Mar Joseph Kalarangatt, Bishop of Palai
- Beena Kannan, business women
- Alphons Kannanthanam, politician
- Thampi Kannanthanam, film director
- Mar Mathew Kavukattu, Archbishop
- Mar George Koovakad, Cardinal and Prefect of Dicastery for Interreligious Dialogue
- Santhosh George Kulangara, managing director of Safari TV
- Anju Kurian, Malayalam actress
- K. P. A. C. Lalitha, South Indian actress
- Mar Mathew Makil, Archbishop
- Mammootty, an actor
- Jose K. Mani, politician
- K. M. Mani, who was the chairman and leader of Kerala Congress (M) which is one of the oldest regional political parties in India.
- Tharun Moorthy, Film Director
- P. K. Vasudevan Nair, Former Chief Minister, Kerala
- Seema G. Nair, Malayalam artist
- K. R. Narayanan, the former President of India
- Kalabhavan Navas, an actor
- Kottayam Nazeer, an actor
- Parvathy Omanakuttan, the Miss World 2008 runner-up
- Mar Antony Padiyara, Cardinal and Major Archbishop
- Mar Thomas Padiyath, Auxiliary Bishop
- Guinness Pakru, a South Indian actor who is the shortest actor in the world
- Mar Joseph Perumthottam, Archbishop Emeritus
- Karoor Neelakanta Pillai, writer
- Mannathu Padmanabha Pillai, a social reformer and the founder of Nair Service Society (N.S.S.)
- N. N. Pillai, an Indian playwright, actor, theatre director, and orator.
- Mar Joseph Powathil, Archbishop
- Kottayam Pradeep, Malayalam actor
- Jose Prakash, actor
- Bheeman Raghu, actor
- Rosemary, Malayalam language poet and translator.
- Arundhati Roy, an Indian author
- Kottarathil Sankunni, Malayalam writer
- Kalabhavan Shajohn, an actor
- E. C. George Sudarshan, scientist, 9 times Nobel Prize nominee.
- Kerala Varma Valiya Koil Thampuran, a Malayalam-language poet and translator
- Mar Thomas Tharayil, Archbishop
- Thilakan, malayalam actor
- Moran Mor Baselios Cleemis Thottunkal, Cardinal and Major Archbishop of Syro Malankara Catholic Church
- Abhilash Tomy, sailor
- Rimi Tomy, playback singer in Kerala
- Ponkunnam Varkey, Malayalam writer
- Palakunnel Valiyachan, Christian leader and writer
- A. R. Raja Raja Varma, a poet
- Vaikom Vijayalakshmi, singer
- Vijayaraghavan, an actor

== See also ==
- Demographics of Kottayam district
- Education in Kottayam district
- Tourist attractions in Kottayam district
- Alappuzha district
- Idukki district
- Kottayam
- Poonjar dynasty
- Thekkumkur
- Vadakkumkur
