= Chemmanathukara =

- town
- Location in Kerala, India Chemmanathukara (India)
- Coordinates: 9°42′0″N 76°24′0″E
- Country: India
- State: Kerala
- District: Kottayam

Languages
  - Official: Malayalam, English
- Time zone: UTC+5:30 (IST)
- PIN: 686606
- Telephone code: 0482-9
- Vehicle registration: KL-36
- Nearest city: Kottayam and Ernakulam
- Lok Sabha constituency: Kottayam
- Assembly constituency: Vaikom

Chemmanathukara is a place in Vaikom Village, Kottayam District, Kerala, India.

It is part of T.V. Puram Panchayat (Thirumani Venkitapuram Panchayat).
