= Lalam, Kottayam =

Lalam
- village
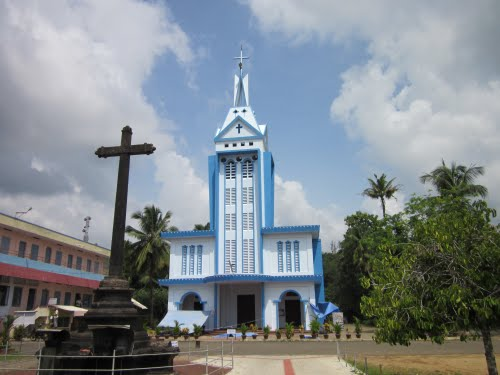
- Church in Lalam, Kottayam district
- Interactive map of Lalam
- Coordinates: 9°43′0″N 76°42′0″E
- Country: India
- State: Kerala
- District: Kottayam

Government
  - Type: Panchayati raj (India)
  - Body: Gram panchayat

Population (2011)
  - Total: 9,137

Languages
  - Official: Malayalam, English
- Time zone: UTC+5:30 (IST)
- PIN: 686575
- Vehicle registration: KL-35

Lalam is a village in Kottayam district in the state of Kerala, India.

== Demographics ==
As of 2011 India census, Lalam had a population of 9137 with 4528 males and 4609 females.
