= Erumeli South =

Erumeli South Erumakolli
- Town
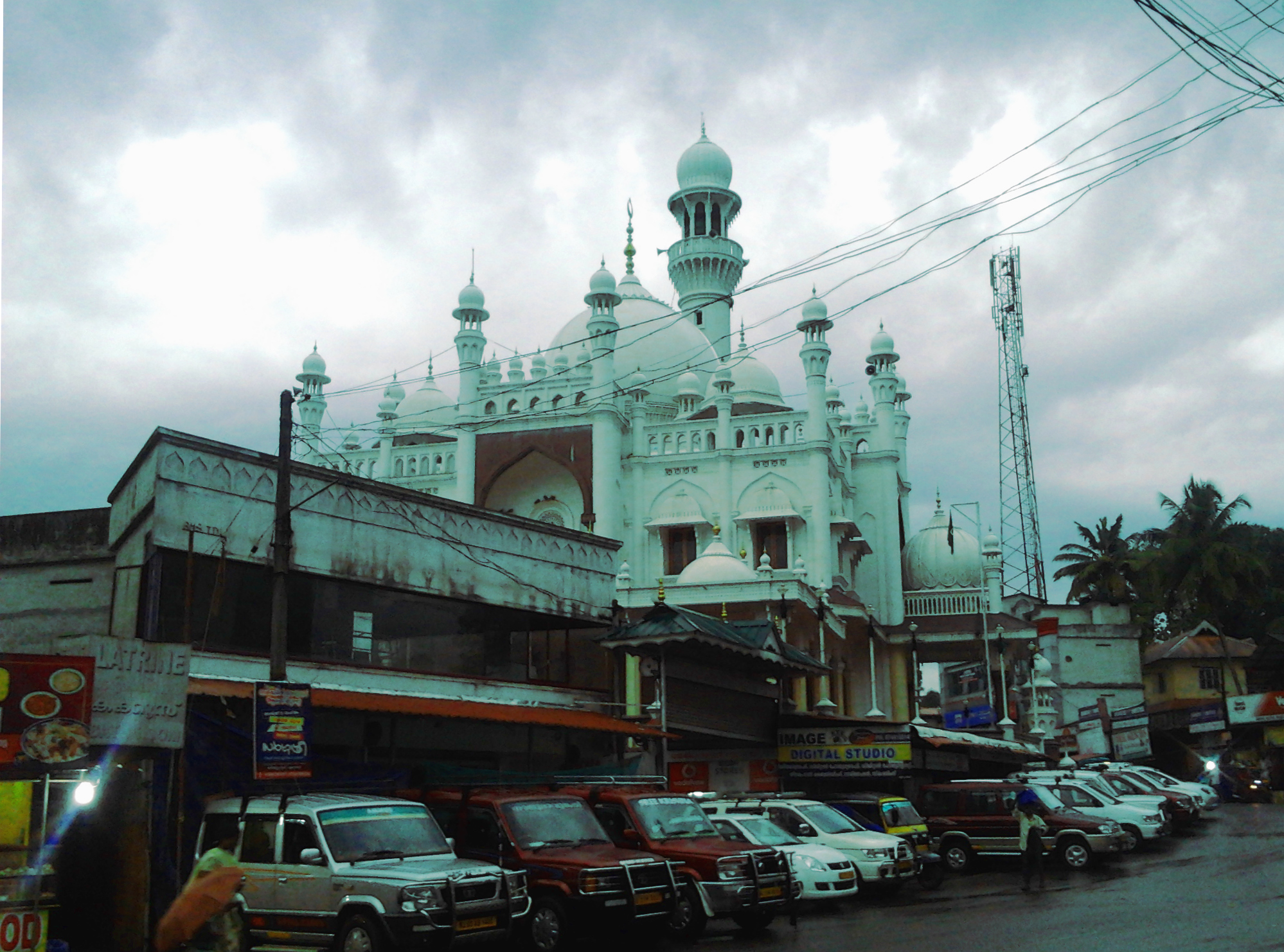
- Country: India
- State: Kerala
- District: Kottayam

Population (2011)
  - Total: 43,437

Languages
  - Official: Malayalam, English
- Time zone: UTC+5:30 (IST)
- PIN: 686509
- Telephone code: 04828
- Vehicle registration: KL-34
- Nearest city: Kanjirappally
- Lok Sabha constituency: Pathanamthitta
- Vidhan Sabha constituency: Poonjar

Erumeli South is a village in Kottayam district in the state of Kerala, India.

== Demographics ==
As of 2011 India census, Erumeli South had a population of 43,437 with 21,199 males and 22,238 females.
