= Veloor, Kottayam =

Veloor
- village
- Interactive map of Veloor
- Coordinates: 9°34′56″N 76°29′56″E
- Country: India
- State: Kerala
- District: Kottayam
- Talukas: Kottayam

Languages
  - Official: Malayalam, English
- Time zone: UTC+5:30 (IST)
- PIN: 686003
- Vehicle registration: KL-05

Veloor is a village in Kottayam district in the state of Kerala, India.
