= Vijayapuram Gram Panchayat =

Village in Kottayam District, Kerala, India

Vijayapuram Grama Panchayat (Vijayapuram Village Panchayat) is a village in Kottaym District in Kerala, India.

It is located close to Kottayam Municipality. The Panchayat headquarters is situated at Vadavathoor which is about 5 km east of Kottayam town.
