= Kalathukadavu =

Kalathukadavu Kalathookadavu
- village
- Location in Kerala, India Kalathukadavu (India)
- Coordinates: 9.7°N 76.78°E
- Country: India
- State: Kerala
- District: Kottayam district

Languages
  - Official: Malayalam, English
- Time zone: UTC+5:30 (IST)
- PIN: 686579
- Telephone code: 0482
- Vehicle registration: KL-
- Nearest city: Kottayam
- Lok Sabha constituency: Kottayam
- Vidhan Sabha constituency: Pala

Kalathukadavu is a village abutting the Meenachil river in Kottayam district of Kerala, India. Kalathukadavu is situated between Erattupetta and Thodupuzha on a state highway. The main landmarks are St. John Vianney Church and St. Alphonsa Lower Primary school. A farming village known for cultivation of cash crops and rubber, it is emerging as a popular residential neighbourhood, with a plethora of shops selling building materials and all kinds of consumables. A bridge across the main tributary of Meenachil river connects Kalathukadavu with Moonnilavu and Chakiniyamthadam. The nearby places from here are Elappunkal, Erattupetta, Palai, Thodupuzha, Melukavu, Monkombu, Thalanadu and Chakiniyamthadam
