= Elackad =

- village
- Country: India
- State: Kerala
- District: Kottayam

Population (2011)
  - Total: 13,333

Languages
  - Official: Malayalam, English
- Time zone: UTC+5:30 (IST)
- PIN: 686587
- Telephone code: 04822
- Vehicle registration: KL-67
- Nearest city: Kuravilangad
- Lok Sabha constituency: Kottayam
- Vidhan Sabha constituency: Kaduthuruthy

Elackad is a village in Kottayam district in the state of Kerala, India.

== Demographics ==
As of 2011 India census, Elackad had a population of 13333 with 6587 males and 6746 females.

== Location ==
Elackad is a village in Meenachil Taluk, just three kilometers away from Kuravilangad. Elackad has two famous Devi Temple called Kakkinikadu Devi Temple and Vazhappillikavu. Annual temple festival (രേവതി അശ്വതി മഹോത്സവം) of Kakkinkkad Devi temple is celebrated between mid February and mid March (കുഭമാസം). There is also a Roman Catholic St. Mary's Church at the center. Govt. UP school and Labour India Gurukulam Public School are the available schools in the village. Nearby villages are Vayala, Kadaplamattam, Kalikavu, and Marangattupally.

== Etymology ==
As the name depicts, Elackad (in Malayalam it means 'forest of leaves') is a forest kind of village. It has road facility, school facilities and library. The main income of the people here is through farming. Rubber, Tapioca, Ginger, Banana are the main crops harvested here.
