= Villoonni =

- village
- Location in Kerala, India Villoonni (India)
- Coordinates: 9°38′0″N 76°30′0″E
- Country: India
- State: Kerala
- District: Kottayam

Languages
  - Official: Malayalam, English
- Time zone: UTC+5:30 (IST)
- Vehicle registration: KL-
- Nearest city: Kottayam
- Lok Sabha constituency: Kottayam

Villoonni is a village 5 miles (8.0 km) from Kottayam, Kerala, India. Its main buildings include St. Xavier's Church, the Village office, St. Philomina LP and HS schools and St Joseph English medium school
