= Vellilappally =

- village
- Country: India
- State: Kerala
- District: Kottayam

Population (2011)
  - Total: 16,509

Languages
  - Official: Malayalam, English
- Time zone: UTC+5:30 (IST)
- Vehicle registration: KL-

Vellilappally is a village in Kottayam district in the state of Kerala, India.

== Demographics ==
As of the 2011 India census, Vellilappally had a population of 16,509 with 8,162 males and 8,347 females.
