= Marangoly =

- Village
- Interactive map of Marangoly
- Coordinates: 9.8140°N 76.5389°E
- Country: India
- State: Kerala
- District: Kottayam

Languages
  - Official: Malayalam, English
- Time zone: UTC+5:30 (IST)
- PIN: 686612
- Nearest city: Elanji
- Lok Sabha constituency: Kottayam

Marangoly is a small village in the Kottayam district of Kerala, India, on the border of Ernakulam district. It is host to a church by the name St. Mary's Church Marangoly where local Catholics offer prayers and worship since 1919. There is also a temple by the name Alummekkavu Devee Kshetram frequented by the local Hindu populace. The village is home to a government lower primary school, a veterinary hospital, and a family welfare center. It is blessed with the beauty of nature consisting of small hills, plains, an abundance of trees, small streams, paddy grounds, a vast expanse of rocky grounds overlooking the area from the nearby hills by the name "Vanchipara", (the name probably deriving from its geographical structure in the shape of a small boat). The cultivation in the area consists mostly of rubber plantations, herbs, rice, tapioca, coconuts, cocoa, pepper, pulses, vegetables, etc. The local population consists mostly of Christians and Hindus. There are no Muslims or Jews in the area. The closest villages or towns are Elanji, Njeezhoor, Shantipuram, Monippally, and Peruva. The state highway SH 42 (Kambam-Kumarakom) passes through Marangoly. Many of the family members of the village folk have made their mark distinguishing themselves in different parts of India and the rest of the world in various professions such as doctors, engineers, nurses, entrepreneurs, teachers, professors, priests, and other religious roles. This village still retains its pristine beauty and the simplicity of its folks.
