= Karimpany =

Village in Kottayam District, Kerala, India

Coordinates: 9.6324°N 76.6149°E

Karimpany is a village in Akalakkunnam Grama panchayat, Kottayam District, Kerala, India.

== Economy ==
Most of the villagers are farmers, but 80% of the younger generation move abroad in search of better opportunities. Karimpanians are well educated, and computer literacy is high compared to many other villages in India. At least 75% of families in Karimpany have at least one member working abroad.

Karimpanians have access to almost all forms of higher education despite being located far from major cities. The nearest city is Pala, which is approximately 18 kilometres away. Despite limited transportation facilities, nothing prevents Karimpanians from pursuing higher levels of education. A significant proportion of the well-educated younger generation in Karimpany seek prosperous careers abroad. Young Karimpanians reside across Europe, North America, and numerous Southeast Asian countries, including Singapore, Malaysia, and Indonesia. Those living abroad range from labourers to professionals.

For Karimpanian farmers, rubber production is the main source of income. For those unable to pursue further education, rubber tapping is a major source of income. Although other agricultural products such as black pepper, ginger, turmeric, vegetables, and tapioca are cultivated, farmers are gradually losing interest in them because of low yields and reduced profitability.

== Toddy shops ==
Karimpany is said to be an interesting place for drinking. One can enter Karimpany through a toddy shop and leave through another. Toddy is a local alcoholic beverage made from the sap of coconut or palm trees.

== Churches ==
Karimpany is also famous for the Blessed Sacrament Church and people believe that the blessings from the church brings prosperity to the village.
