= Demographics of Kottayam district =

Historical population
Year	Pop.	±% p.a.
1901	450,615	—
1911	488,040	+0.80%
1921	585,478	+1.84%
1931	775,069	+2.84%
1941	942,899	+1.98%
1951	1,132,478	+1.85%
1961	1,313,983	+1.50%
1971	1,539,030	+1.59%
1981	1,697,442	+0.98%
1991	1,828,271	+0.75%
2001	1,953,646	+0.67%
2011	1,974,551	+0.11%

According to the 2011 census of India, Kottayam district has a population of 1,979,384. This gives it a ranking of 234th in India (out of a total of 640). The district has a population density of 896 inhabitants per square kilometre (2,320/sq mi). Its population growth rate over the decade 2001–11 was 1.32%. Kottayam has a sex ratio of 1,040 females for every 1,000 males and a literacy rate of 96.4%. The population in Kottayam includes Hindus (49.81%), Christians (43.48%), and Muslims (6.41%).

== Religion ==
Religions in Kottayam District
Religion	Percent
Hindus	49.81%
Christians	43.48%
Muslims	6.41%
Others	0.3%
Distribution of religions Source: 2011 Census.

Hindus, Christians and Muslims form a significant part of the population. In 2011 Indian Census Muslim Population is 6.41%, Hindu 49.81%, Christian 43.48%. Kottayam, Thiruvalla and Chengannur are the railway stations for pilgrims heading to the Hindu holy site of Sabarimala.

Kottayam is a major center for Saint Thomas Christians in Kerala. Syrian Christians include Syro-Malabar Catholic, Jacobite Syrian Christian Church (Jacobite), Knanaya, Syro-Malankara Catholic, Malankara Mar Thoma Syrian Church, Pentecostals and other members of Malankara Orthodox and Madhya Kerala Diocese of the Church of South India.

According to CDS Data About 54% of Kottayam Christians are Syro-Malabar Catholic, 8.8% are Jacobite Syrian Christian Church (Jacobite), 6.9% are Syro-Malankara Catholic, 5.5% are Malankara Orthodox, 3.4% are Malankara Mar Thoma Syrian Church. Among Protestant's CSI church is the largest denomination in the district with over 150,000 believers. Protestants in Kottayam include Pentecost churches. A number of old and sacred Christian churches are also located in Kottayam.
