= Elikkulam =

Village in Kerala, India

- village
- Location in Kerala, India Elikkulam (India)
- Coordinates: 9°36′0″N 76°43′0″E
- Country: India
- State: Kerala
- District: Kottayam

Population (2011)
  - Total: 10,419

Languages
  - Official: Malayalam, English
- Time zone: UTC+5:30 (IST)
- Vehicle registration: KL-

Elikkulam is a village in Kottayam district in the state of Kerala, India. It is located between the plantation towns of Kanjirapally and Palai, and is the northernmost boundary of Kanjirapally Taluk.

== Demographics ==
As of 2011 India census, Elikkulam had a population of 10419 with 5147 males and 5272 females. The population chiefly comprises Syrian Christians and Hindus. The place is purely agrarian, with its people engaged in cultivation of cash crops, mainly rubber.
