= Kuzhimattom =

- village
- Location in Kerala, India Kuzhimattom (India)
- Coordinates: 9°31′0″N 76°32′30″E
- Country: India
- State: Kerala
- District: Kottayam

Languages
  - Official: Malayalam, English
- Time zone: UTC+5:30 (IST)
- Postal code: 686533
- Vehicle registration: KL-05

Kuzhimattom is a small village in the Kottayam district of the Kerala state, India. It is about 11 km from Kottayam. It is situated in the Panachikkad panchayat and belongs to the block of Pallom.

One of the major landmarks of Kuzhimattom is the St. George Orthodox church, which was established in 1902. Panchikkadu temple is dedicated to Saraswati, and is very famous for its Vidyarambham.

== See also ==
- Temples of Kerala
