= Perumbaikad =

- city
- Location in Kerala, India Perumbaikad (India)
- Coordinates: 9°37′17″N 76°31′35″E
- Country: India
- State: Kerala
- District: Kottayam

Population (2001)
  - Total: 42,984

Languages
  - Official: Malayalam, English
- Time zone: UTC+5:30 (IST)

Perumbaikad is a census town in Kottayam district in the Indian state of Kerala.

== Demographics ==
As of 2001 India census, Perumbaikad had a population of 42,984. Males constitute 49% of the population and females 51%. Perumbaikad has an average literacy rate of 86%, higher than the national average of 59.5%: male literacy is 87%, and female literacy is 86%. In Perumbaikad, 11% of the population is under 6 years of age.
