= Vadakkemuri =

- village
- Country: India
- State: Kerala
- District: Kottayam

Government
  - Type: Panchayati raj (India)
  - Body: Gram panchayat

Population (2011)
  - Total: 17,019

Languages
  - Official: Malayalam, English
- Time zone: UTC+5:30 (IST)
- Vehicle registration: KL-

Vadakkemuri is a village in Kottayam district in the state of Kerala, India.

== Demographics ==
As of 2011 India census, Vadakkemuri had a population of 17019 with 8296 males and 8723 females.
