= Thalayazham =

- village
- Location in Kerala, India Thalayazham (India)
- Coordinates: 9°41′55″N 76°25′25″E
- Country: India
- State: Kerala
- District: Kottayam

Government
  - Type: Panchayati raj (India)
  - Body: Gram panchayat

Population (2001)
  - Total: 20,171

Languages
  - Official: Malayalam, English
- Time zone: UTC+5:30 (IST)
- Postal code: 686607
- Vehicle registration: KL-36

Thalayazham is a small village located in Vaikom Taluk, Kottayam district, Kerala, India.

== Demographics ==
As of 2001 India census, Thalayazham had a population of 20,171 with 9,923 males and 10,248 females.
