= Erumeli North =

Village in Kerala, India

- Village
- Location within Kerala Location within India
- Coordinates: 09°31′16″N 76°51′22″E
- Country: India
- State: Kerala
- District: Kottayam
- Taluk: Kanjirappally

Government
  - Type: Sarpanch

Area
  - Total: 55.11 km^{2} (21.28 sq mi)
- Elevation: 227 m (745 ft)

Population (2011)
  - Total: 40,511
  - Density: 735.1/km^{2} (1,904/sq mi)

Languages
  - Official: Malayalam, English
- Time zone: UTC+5:30 (IST)
- PIN: 686513
- STD code: 04828
- Vehicle registration: KL-34

Erumeli North is a village in Kanjirappally Taluk, Kottayam District, Kerala, India. It is located near the boundary with Idukki District, about 34 kilometres southeast of the district seat Kottayam, and about 6 kilometres southeast of the taluk seat Kanjirappally. In 2011, it has a population of 40,511.

== Geography ==
Erumeli North is situated on the northern bank of Manimala River. Kerala State Highway 59 passes through the village. It has an area of 5511 hectares.

== Demographics ==
According to 2011 Indian Census, there are a total of 10,125 households in Erumeli North. Out of 40,511 inhabitants, 19,820 are male and 20,691 are female. The total literacy rate is 86.16%, with 17,196 of the male population and 17,709 of the female population being literate. Its census location code is 628203.
