= Vadakkumkur =

The Kingdom of Vadakkumkur was a late medieval/early modern feudal principality located in the Indian state of Kerala. Along with Thekkumkur, it succeeded from the early medieval political region of Vempolinad by around 1200 AD. After their separation, Thekkumkur became an independent kingdom, while Vadakkumkur became a vassal of Cochin. During the time of Portuguese dominance in Cochin, disputes arose between the Vadakkumkur chieftain and the Kingdom of Cochin over the pepper trade and the Vadakkumkur Rajah was killed in battle with Cochin and their Portuguese allies. Vadakkumkur and Thekkumkur were later annexed by Marthanda Varma and incorporated into the Kingdom of Travancore.
