= Tourist attractions in Kottayam district =

Notable sites in Kottayam district in the Indian state of Kerala include St. Mary's Jacobite Syrian Cathedral in Manarcad, St. George Church in Puthuppally, Mahadevar Temple temple in Thirunakkara| and Thazhathangady Juma Mosque in Thazhathangady.
