= Adithyapuram Sun Temple =

Adithyapuram Surya Deva Temple
- ആദിത്യപുരം സൂര്യദേവ ക്ഷേത്രം
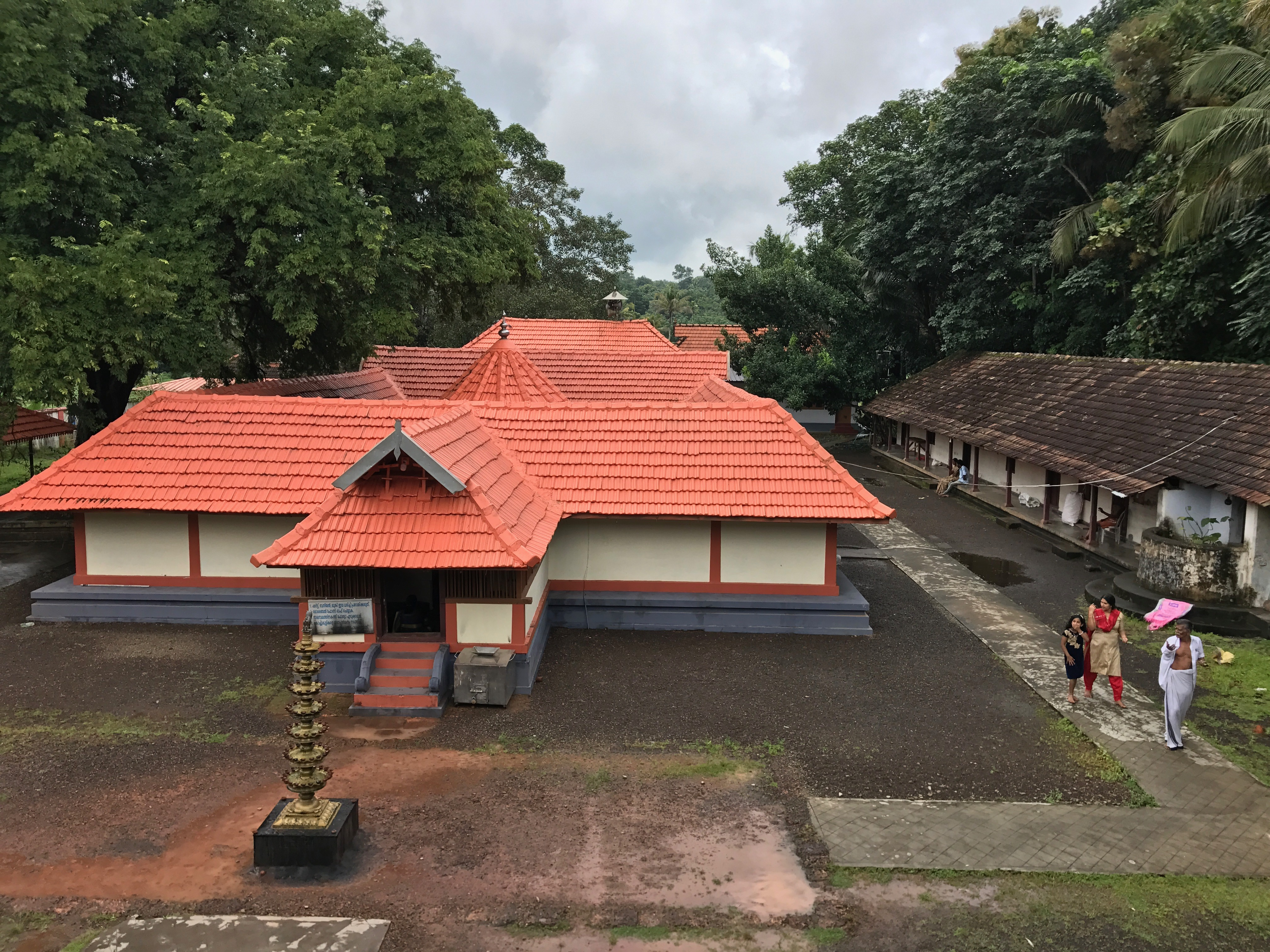

- Location in Kerala

Religion
- Affiliation: Hinduism
- District: Kottayam
- Deity: Surya
- Festival: Thiruvutsavam in Medam
- Governing body: www.adithyapuramtemple.org

Location
- Location: Kaduthuruthy
- State: Kerala
- Country: India
- Coordinates: 9°44′25″N 76°29′12″E

Architecture
- Type: Traditional Kerala style

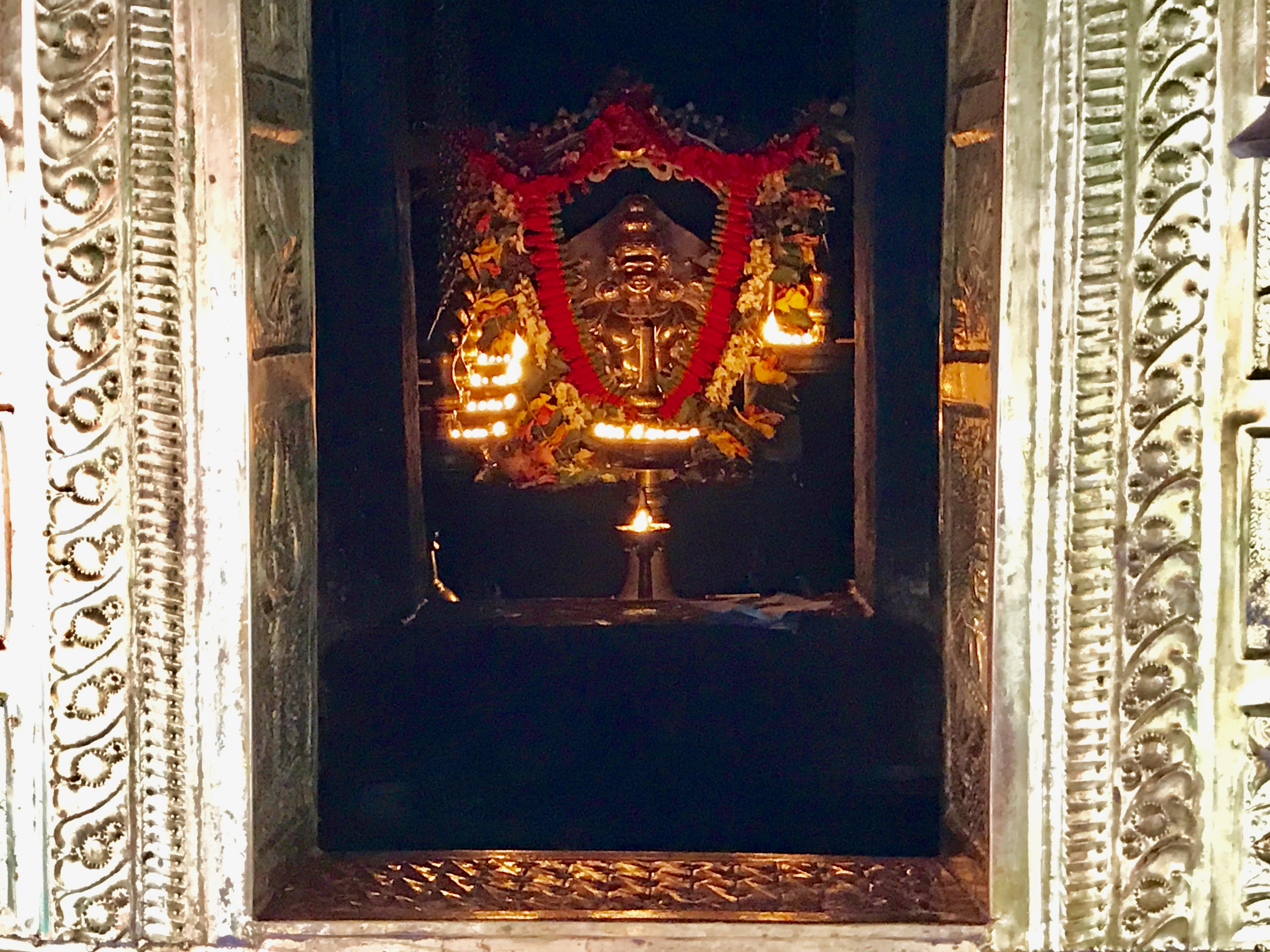
Murti of sun god in the temple

Adithyapuram Surya Temple is a Hindu temple in Iravimangalam about 3 km from Kaduthuruthy in Kottayam district in the Indian state of Kerala. It is the only adithya (Hindu solar deity) shrine in the state.
