= Chengalam =

Chengalam East Elikkulam Padua of Kerala
- Village
- Location in Kerala, India Chengalam East (India)
- Coordinates: 9.6488600°N 76.702450°E
- Country: India
- State: Kerala
- District: Kottayam

Languages
  - Official: Malayalam, English
- Time zone: UTC+5:30 (IST)
- PIN: 686585
- Telephone code: 04828 & 0481
- ISO 3166 code: IN-KL
- Vehicle registration: KL-34 & KL-05
- Nearest city: Ponkunnam

Chengalam is a village situated in the east of Kottayam District in India.

== Location ==
The town is on the border of Kottayam, Kanjirappally and Pala Taluka. Chengalam is well connected by road to urban areas like Pala (15 km), Kanjirappally (14 km), Ponkunnam (9 km), Paika (5 km) and Pallickathode (4 km). It is located 26 km from Kottayam, the district capital. The nearby district capitals are Idukki (85 km), Pathanamthitta (50 km), Alappuzha (63 km), Ernakulam (78 km). Thiruvananthapuram, the state capital is located (156 km) from Chengalam.

== Economy ==
Chengalam is predominantly an agricultural and animal husbandry based economy with a few industrial areas.

== Demographics ==
Chengalam is a village is part of the Kottayam Taluka, Kanjirappally Taluka and Meenachil Taluka of Kottayam district, Kerala with total 1215 families residing there. Population of Chengalam is predominantly Saint Thomas Christians (Syrian Catholics/Syro Malabar) who trace their origins to the evangelistic activity of Thomas the Apostle in the 1st century. As of 2011 India census, Chengalam had a population of 5226 of which 2519 are males and 2707 are females.

In Chengalam village population of children with age 0–6 is 446 which makes up 8.53% of total population of village. Average Sex Ratio of Chengalam village is 1075 which is lower than Kerala state average of 1084. Child Sex Ratio for Chengalam as per census is 1046, higher than Kerala average of 964.

Chengalam village has higher literacy rate compared to Kerala. In 2011, literacy rate of Chengalam village was 97.51% compared to 94.00% of Kerala. In Chengalam Male literacy stands at 97.35% while female literacy rate was 97.66%.

== History ==
The present village of Chengalam was once inhabited by wild animals. People from the neighbouring villages of Cherpunkal, Poovarany, Pala, Kanjirappally, Kozhuvanal and Anickadu started occupying the area in the 18th century.

The area belonged to the then Thiruvarppu Devasm and was known as "Chenkalkulam" as there was a pond hewn out of "Chenkal". It is believed that the pond was built to gather water needed for the annual homam, rituals to appease the deities. Later the term Chenkalkulam became "Chenkulam" and finally Chengalam. This is the story behind the etymology of the local name Chengalam.

Before 50–60 years the church here St Antony's Church was very much famous. The church is in the name of Anthony of Padua. The foundation stone of this church has laid in 1913. Also the Chengalam market was very famous. The place is very calm and quiet. The climate is nice with enough rainfall and moderate temperatures. This place is also known as Padua of Kerala.
