= Kuruvamoozhy =

- Village
- Location of Kuruvamoozhy in Kerala Kuruvamoozhy (India)
- Coordinates: 9.501°N 76.837°E
- Country: India
- State: Kerala
- District: Kottayam
- Taluk: Kanjirappally
- Time zone: UTC+5:30 (IST)
- Area code: 04828

Kuruvamoozhy is a village located on the village of Koovapally, at Kottayam district of the Indian state of Kerala. In Kuruvamoozhy there is the Catholic Church of Saint Joseph and its parochial school. There is a post office which is under the Erumely post office as well as local groceries, barber shop, bakeries and a petrol pump.

== Nearby places ==
- Changanassery
- Chenappady
- Erumely
- Kanjirappally
- Kottayam
- Mukkoottuthara
- Mundakayam
- Pathanamthitta
- Ranni
- Vizhikkithodu
