= Parathodu =

Parathodu Parathode
- Village
- Location in Kerala, India Parathodu (India)
- Coordinates: 9°34′15″N 76°49′55″E
- Country: India
- State: Kerala
- District: Kottayam

Government
  - Type: Panchayati raj (India)
  - Body: Parathodu Grama Panchayat

Area
  - Total: 53.49 km^{2} (20.65 sq mi)

Population (2011)
  - Total: 32,864
  - Density: 614.4/km^{2} (1,591/sq mi)

Languages
  - Official: Malayalam, English
- Time zone: UTC+5:30 (IST)
- PIN: 686512
- Telephone code: 04828
- Vehicle registration: KL-34
- Climate: Tropical monsoon (Köppen)
- Nearest city: Kanjirappally
- Niyamasabha Constituency: Poonjar
- Lok Sabha Constituency: Pathanamthitta

Parathodu is a village under Kanjirappally Taluk in the Kottayam district of Kerala, India. It is located 44 km east of Kottayam, in the eastern midland–highrange belt, the area has an economy largely supported by rubber and other plantation crops. It features a mix of rural and semi-urban characteristics, with access to schools, basic healthcare facilities, and good connectivity to major towns.

== Administration ==
Parathodu Grama Panchayat is a part of Kanjirappally Block Panchayat.There are a total of 21 wards in Parathodu Panchayat. It consists of 4 revenue villages, Edakkunnam, Kanjirappally , Mundakayam and Koovappally.

== Climate ==
Parathodu has a tropical monsoon climate, closely resembling that of Kanjirappally, which is one of the wettest inhabited regions in Kerala. The area receives very high annual rainfall, typically ranging between 3,500 mm and 4,500 mm, largely due to its position along the windward slopes of the Western Ghats. Rainfall is heaviest during the Southwest Monsoon (June–September), and the Northeast Monsoon (October–November).

Temperatures remain relatively stable throughout the year. Daytime temperatures generally range between 28–32 °C, while night temperatures fall to 20–24 °C, slightly cooler than the lowland regions. High humidity and frequent cloud cover are characteristic of the region, and mist formation is common during early mornings in the monsoon season.

== Transportation ==
Parathodu is connected to nearby towns and regional centres through the National Highway 183 (NH 183), which links Kottayam with Kumily and continues to Dindigul in Tamil Nadu. The highway provides access to major markets and facilitates the movement of agricultural and plantation produce from the highrange areas. Regular bus services operate along this route, connecting Parathodu with Kanjirappally, Mundakayam, Ponkunnam, and other neighbouring localities.

=== Distance to nearby towns ===
- Kanjirappally - 6 KM
- Mundakayam - 10 KM
- Ponkunnam - 10 KM
- Erumely - 15 KM
- Erattupetta - 17 KM
- Pala - 26 KM

== Demographics ==
According to the 2011 census, Parathodu Grama Panchayat had a total population of 32,864, comprising 16,209 males and 16,655 females in 7,841 households. The sex ratio was 1,028 females per 1,000 males, which is lower than the Kerala state average of 1,084. The population of children in the 0–6 age group was 3,312 (10.08% of the total), including 1,709 males and 1,603 females.

== Educational Institutions ==
- St. Dominic's College
- Gracey Memorial High School, Parathodu
- Government Higher Secondary School, Edakkunnam
- Assumption High School, Palampra
- Alfeen Public School, 26th Mile
- Mary Matha Public School, Edakkunnam

== Hospitals ==
- Mary Queens Mission Hospital, 26th Mile
- Highrange Hospital, Parathodu
- Family Health Center, Parathodu (Edakkunnam)
