= Inchiyani =

Inchiyani Inchiyani
- town
- Location in Kerala, India Inchiyani (India)
- Coordinates: 9°32′10″N 76°51′45″E
- Country: India
- State: Kerala
- District: Kottayam

Population
  - Total: 2,500

Languages
  - Official: Malayalam, English
- Time zone: UTC+5:30 (IST)
- PIN: 686512
- Vehicle registration: KL-34
- Sex ratio: 1:1 ♂/♀
- Lok Sabha constituency: Pathanamthitta
- Climate: humid (Köppen)

Inchiyani is a village near Mundakayam in Kanjirappally Taluk of Kerala, India.

== History ==
Sir C.P. Ramaswamy Iyer took over 20,000-acre (81 km^{2}) land of First Freedom Fighter Chempil Arayan Ananthapadmanabhan Valiya Arayan situated in Edakunnam, Erumely and Ranni.

== Location ==
Inchiyaniis located 5 kilometres (3.1 mi) from National Highway 183, with access from Chittady, or from Parathodu via Edakkunnam.
