= Koruthodu =

- Village
- Location in Kerala, India Koruthodu (India)
- Coordinates: 9°28′0″N 76°57′0″E
- Country: India
- State: Kerala
- District: Kottayam

Government
  - Body: Koruthodu Grama Panchayath

Population (2008)
  - Total: 21,470

Languages
  - Official: Malayalam, English
- Time zone: UTC+5:30 (IST)
- PIN: 686513
- Telephone code: 04828
- Vehicle registration: KL-34
- Nearest city: Kottayam, Mundakayam.
- Lok Sabha constituency: Pathanamthitta
- Civic agency: Koruthodu
- Climate: cool pleasant (Köppen)

Koruthodu is a village/town in Kanjirappally Taluk, Kottayam District of Kerala state, India. It is situated on the Highway connecting Mundakayam to Sabarimala temple, Kerala, and is at the border of Pathanamthitta, Kottayam and Idukki districts. The nearest town Mundakayam is 13 Kilometers from Koruthodu. The river Azhutha (Tributary of Pamba) runs through the borders of this village. Nearby locations include Kanamala, Vandanpathal, Mundakkayam and Panakkachira.

Major crops are coffee, Tapioca, Banana, pepper, cocoa and natural rubber.

== Notable athletes ==
- Anju Bobby George
- Shiny Wilson
- Joseph Abraham

== Nearest Airport ==
Cochin International Airport

== See also ==
- National Highway 183 (India).
- Kanjirappally.
