= Koorali =

- Village
- Location in Kerala, India Koorali (India)
- Coordinates: 9.5474°N 76.80015°E
- Country: India
- State: Kerala
- District: Kottayam
- Taluk: Kanjirappally

Government
  - Type: Democracy
  - Body: Panchayat

Population (2011)
  - Total: 1,003

Languages
  - Official: Malayalam, English
- Time zone: UTC+5:30 (IST)
- PIN: 686522
- Telephone code: 04828
- Vehicle registration: KL 34, KL 05
- Literacy: 97.2%

Koorali is a place situated at Kottayam district of Kerala, India.

Panamattom, Elamgulam, Thampalakad, Kanjirappally and Ponkunnam are the nearest places to Koorali.
