= Cheruvally Devi Temple =

- ചെറുവളളി ശ്രീഭദ്രകാളി ഭഗവതിക്ഷേത്രം
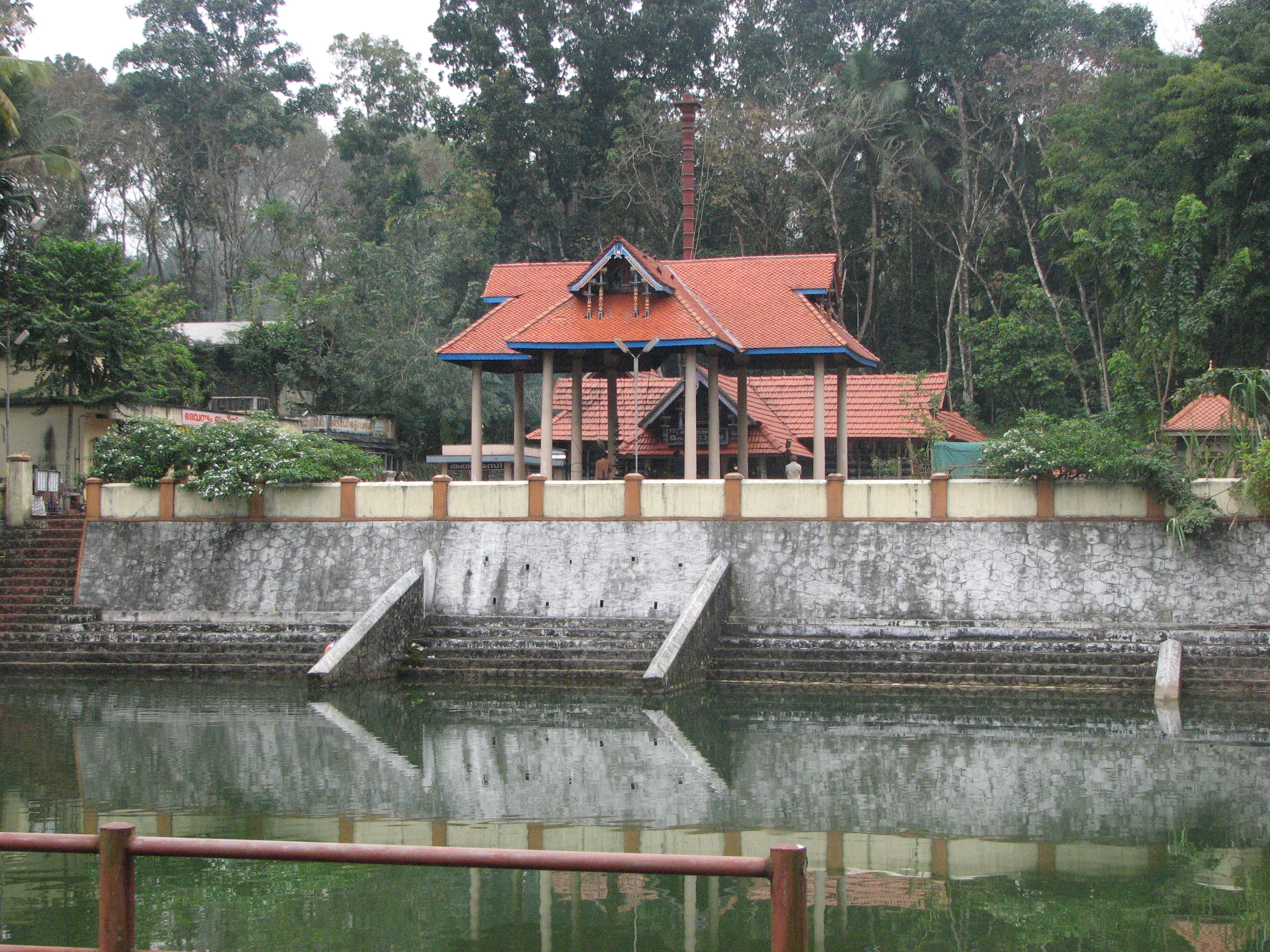
- Cheruvally Sree Bhadra temple

- Location in Kerala

Religion
- Affiliation: Hinduism
- District: Kottayam
- Deity: Bhadrakali
- Festivals: Thiruvutsavam in Meenam, Navarathri, Durgashtami
- Governing body: Travancore Devaswom Board

Location
- Location: Cheruvally
- State: Kerala
- Country: India
- Interactive map of Cheruvally Devi Temple
- Coordinates: 9°31′3.77″N 76°45′50.18″E

Architecture
- Type: Traditional Kerala style

Website
- http://cheruvallydevitemple.com/

The Cheruvally Devi Temple is located in the village of Cheruvally in the Kanjirappally taluk of Kottayam, Kerala state, India. The presiding deity here is Goddess Bhadrakali, a more fierce form of [Devi Aadishakthi. Along with Her, there are various sub-deities installed in the temple, which include Ganapathi, Shiva, Parvathi, Vishnu, Ayyappan, Subrahmanya, Durga, Veerabhadra, Kodumkali, Snake deities, Brahmarakshassu, Judge Ammavan and Yakshiyamma. Among them, the shrine of Judge Ammavan has special significance, because there is no any other place with such a deity. People believe that pleasing Judge Ammavan will solve all issues related to judicial matters, and due to this reason, many lawyers, judges and various people who are bound in or filed cases come here and worship him with coconut. The temple is estimated to be at least thousand years old which is quite unique in its customs and traditions. The temple once under the possession of tribes later came in the hands of many landlords.

== Location ==
The temple is located 35 km (22 mi) southeast to Kottayam, 10 km (6.2 mi) southwest to Kanjirappally and 7 km (4.3 mi) south to Ponkunnam. It is located on the Ponkunnam - Manimala route.

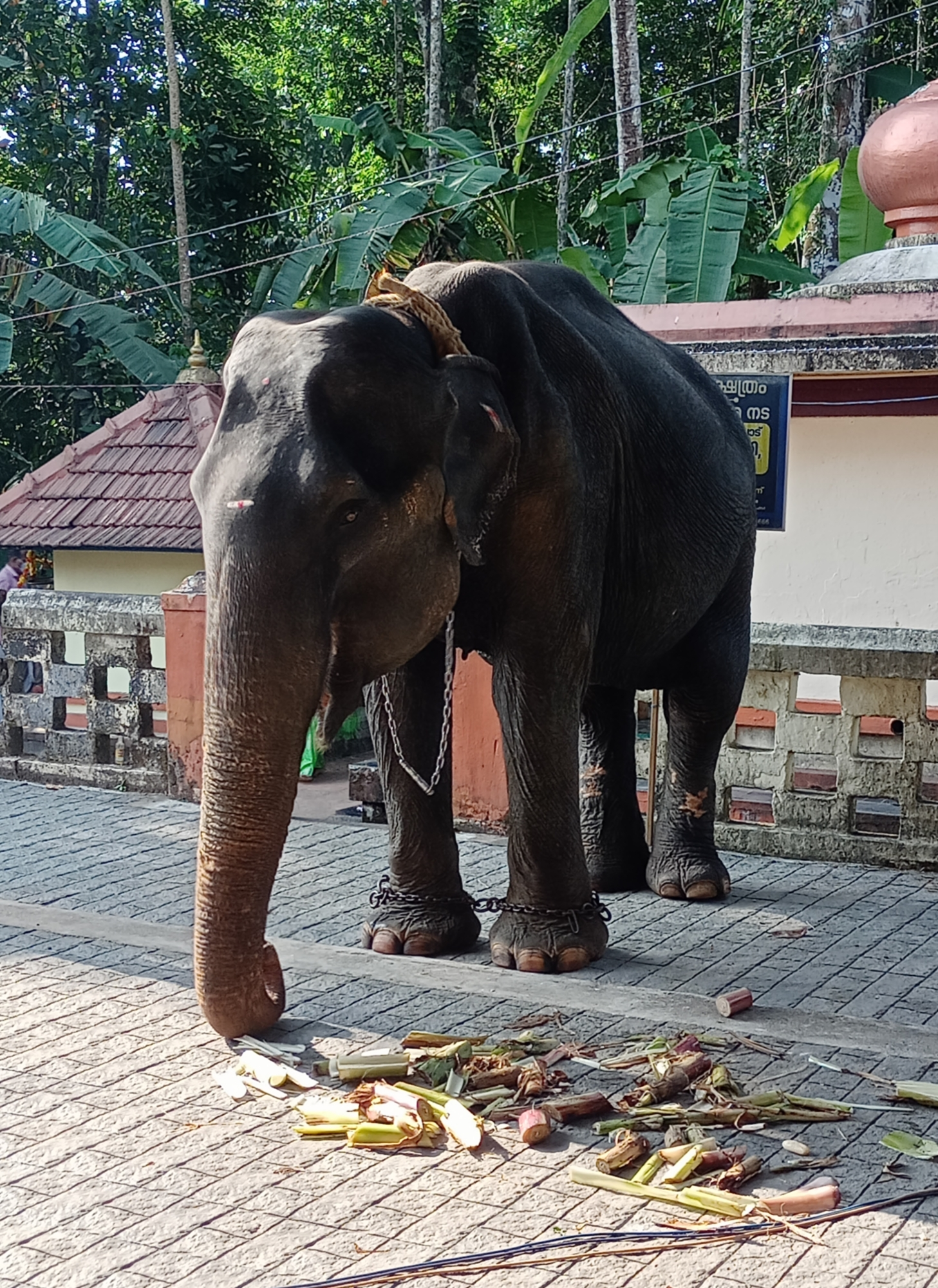
Kusumam, Temple elephant of Cheruvally Devi Temple

== Judge Ammavan ==
The main attraction of the temple is the shrine of Judge Ammavan, who is the ghost of an extremely honest Judge who died an unnatural death. This shrine came to being only in 1978, but has already achieved statewide attention, and many lawyeres, judges and others who got accused in various cases come here and worship with coconut. The story behind this shrine is as follows:

Ramavarmapurathu Madom Govinda Pillai, a native of Cheruvally, was the Judge of Travancore Sardar court. He was well-respected by all his colleagues, and the then King of Travancore, Karthika Thirunal Rama Varma, popularly known as 'Dharma Raja', supported him very much. But once, due to some terrible circumstances, he had to execute his nephew Padmanabha Pillai in a crime which he did not commit. When Pillai came to know that he was mistaken, he was overcome with grief, and told the King to execute him. The King reluctantly agreed his proposal, and Pillai was executed brutally. Since he had an unnatural death, Pillai's ghost began to cause troubles in various places, and to pacify it, a sub-shrine was constructed here. Installed many devotees conducted ada nivedyam vazhipadu for success in legal cases and studies.
