= National Highway 183 (India) =

National highway in India

National Highway 183
- Map of the National Highway 183 in red
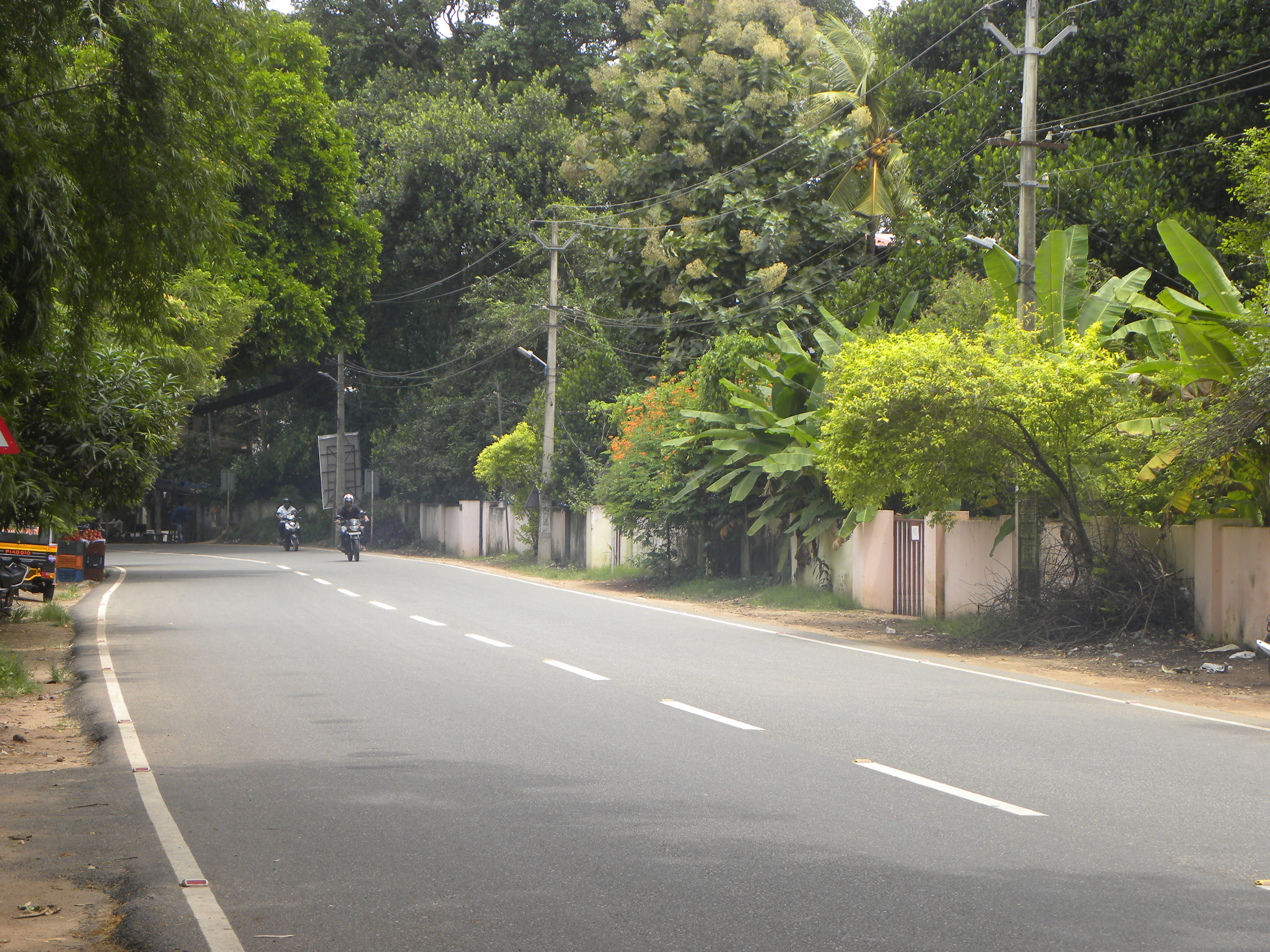
- NH-183 at Thevally, Kollam

Route information
- Length: 350 km (220 mi)

Major junctions
- From: Dindigul, Tamil Nadu
- NH 83, Dindigul; NH 85, Theni; NH 185, Kumily; NH 183A, Vandiperiyar; SH-1, Kottayam; NH 183A, Bharanikkavu; NH 66, Kadavoor
- To: Kollam, Kerala

Location
- Country: India
- States: Tamil Nadu: 134 km Kerala: 216 km
- Primary destinations: Dindigul, Periyakulam, Theni, Uthamapalayam, Cumbum, Kumily Peermade, Kanjirapally, Pampady, Kottayam, Changanacherry, Thiruvalla, Chengannur, Kollakadavu, Charummoodu, Bharanikkavu, Kundara, Anchalumoodu, Kollam

Highway system
- Roads in India; Expressways; National; State; Asian
← NH 83	→ NH 66

National Highways 183 (NH 183) is located in India. It connects Kollam High school Jn in Kerala with Dindigul in Tamil Nadu. Starting from Kollam it runs northwards to Thiruvalla and turns east at Kottayam and runs along the northern border of Periyar Wildlife Sanctuary before crossing the border into Tamil Nadu and end near Dindigul, where it joins NH 83(Coimbatore - Nagapattinam). This highway was previously known as NH 220. Check the NH 183 videos.

== Route ==
=== Kerala ===
Kollam H.S Jn. → Thevally → Thrikkadavoor → Anchalumoodu → Perinad → Kundara (Elampalloor) → Perayam → Chittumala → East Kallada → Bharanikkavu → Sooranad North → Thamarakulam → Charummoodu → Chunakkara → Mankamkuzhi → Kollakadavu → Kodukulanji → Pennukkara → Chengannur → Kallissery → Kuttoor → Thiruvalla → Changanassery → Chingavanam → Kottayam → Manarkadu → Pampady → Vazhoor → Ponkunnam → Kanjirapalli → Podimattom → Mundakayam → Peruvanthanam → Kuttikkanam → Peermade → Vandiperiyar → Kumily

=== Tamil Nadu ===
Gudalur → Cumbum → Uthamapalayam → Chinnamanur → Theni → Periyakulam → Batlagundu → Dindigul

== National Highway 183A ==
A new highway National Highway 183A (India) was declared in March 2014 which runs from Panmana Titanium Junction in (near Kollam) to Mundakkayam via Thevalakkara - Kovoor - Sasthamkotta - Kadampanad - Nellimukal - Adoor - Anandapally – Thattayil – Kaipattoor – Omalloor – Pathanamthitta – Mylapra – Kumplampoika – Vadasserikara – Perunad – Lahai - Plappally - Kanamala - Mukkoottuthara - Erumeli - Mundakkayam. This highway is a shorter route to Vandiperiyar from Adoor via, Kaipattoor, Pathanamthitta rather than the long route from Kottayam. Check the NH 183A videos.
