= Panakkachira =

- village
- Location in Kerala, India Panakkachira (India)
- Coordinates: 9°29′15″N 76°53′5″E
- Country: India
- State: Kerala
- District: Kottayam

Government
  - Type: Panchayath

Languages
  - Official: Malayalam, English
- Time zone: UTC+5:30 (IST)
- PIN: 686513
- Telephone code: 04828
- Vehicle registration: KL-34
- Lok Sabha constituency: Pathanamthitta
- Nearest cities: Mundakayam, Koruthodu

Panakkachira is a small village in Kanjirappally taluk of Kottayam District, Kerala, India. The village is approximately 7 km (4.3 mi) southeast of Mundakayam.
