= Cheruvally =

- village
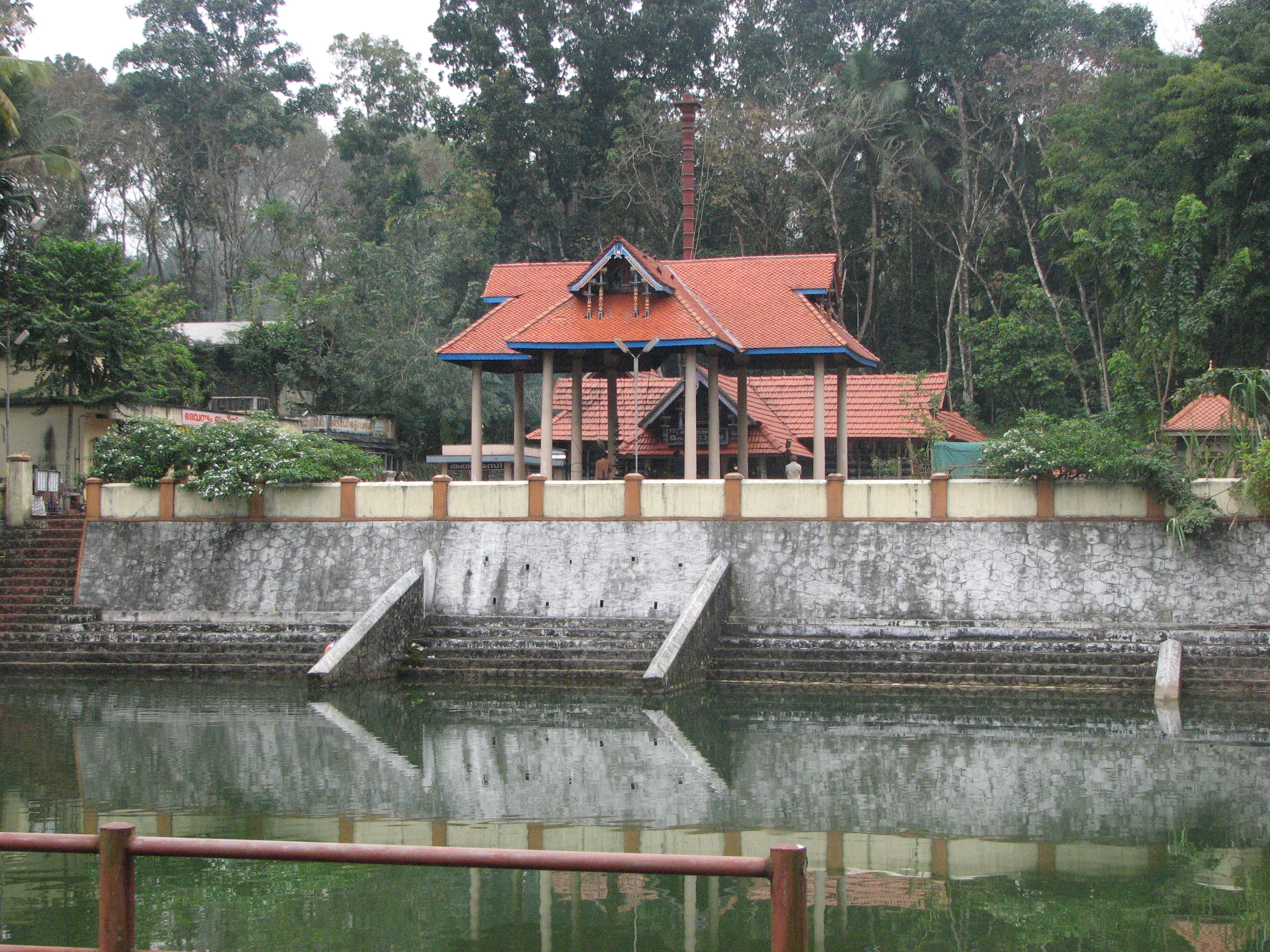
- Cheruvally Sree Bhagavathi Temple, which is the main landmark of Cheruvally

- Location in Kerala, India Cheruvally (India)
- Coordinates: 9.5220000°N 76.76669°E
- Country: India
- State: Kerala
- District: Kottayam

Languages
  - Official: Malayalam, English
- Time zone: UTC+5:30 (IST)
- PIN: 686519
- Vehicle registration: KL-34
- Nearest city: Ponkunnam & Thiruvalla (30 km)
- Lok Sabha constituency: Pathanamthitta

Cheruvally is a village in Chirakkadavu panchayat of Kottayam district in Kerala. It is in Kanjirappally taluk of Kottayam district. There is a Bhadrakali temple, viz., Cheruvally Devi Temple in Cheruvally.

== In past and in future ==
Name of the place is derived from the factual history related to cheruvally temple. Kerala govt and central govt gave approval to construct airport for Sabarimala at Cheruvally Estate near Erumeli. The proposed Sabarigiri International Airport in Central Travancore is to come up on the 2263 acre Cheruvally estate, 2.5 km from the Theni-Kottarakara National Highway and close to Erumeli town in Kottayam district and is about 48 km from Sabarimala. Cheruvally Estate is close to two NH corridors and five PWD roads. A ₹2,500-crore greenfield airport to be developed by a joint venture of Non-Resident Indians.The GIA had also floated a company, Indo-Heritage International Aeropolis Pvt. Ltd. (IHIAPL), for executing the project and opened its office in Pathanamthitta. Besides catering to the needs of the flyers in Central Travancore, the airport is expected to reduce the heavy traffic on the roads leading to Sabarimala during the pilgrim season. Pilgrims alighting at the Chengannur and Thiruvalla railway stations reach Sabarimala through various routes linked to M.C. Road or National Highway.Nearest Railway Station Is Thiruvalla, Located 38 km and 26 km from Thiruvalla sub-district and taluk limits.

== History ==
Cheruvally has its own relevance in the historic and cultural charts of Central Travancore. Formerly this was under the reign of Vanjipuzha Matt, Poonjar.

== Famous personalities ==
- James Manjackal (1946), Catholic priest and important member of Charismatic movement.
