= Thampalakad =

- village
- Location in Kerala, India Thampalakad (India)
- Coordinates: 9°35′10″N 76°45′55″E
- Country: India
- State: Kerala
- District: Kottayam

Languages
  - Official: Malayalam, English
- Time zone: UTC+5:30 (IST)
- PIN: 686506
- Vehicle registration: KL-34
- Nearest city: Kottayam
- Lok Sabha constituency: Pathanamthitta
- Climate: sunny, rainy (Köppen)

Thampalakkad is a small village in Kottayam district, Kerala, which is located around 5 km from Kanjirappally on the way to Manjakuzhy. It has the same distance from Ponkunnam, Manjakuzhy, Koorali, Anakkal, Kappadu, Panamattom and Vanchimala. Its name is derived from Thamboolam which was used for fixing the idol at the Mahadeva Temple, by the legendary Naranathu Bhranthan.

== Demographics ==
It is inhabited by around 3000 people, mainly small farmers and employees of government departments and private establishments. It is home to the Sri Mahadeva Temple, St. Thomas Church, Mahakalipara Devi Temple, Kadakayam Hanuman Temple,Illathappan Kavu Temple, Penuel Ashram, Emmanuel Ashram, IMS Devotional Center, St. Rita's School, SNDP Yogam Unit, NSS Veda Vyasa School, Govt. LP School, NSS School and the St. Anthony's Church, Manthara. This place bears the Postal code 686506. Prominent places are Thekkumbhagam, Pallikavala, Manthra, Shaapupadi, Panamattom Cross or 4th Mile.

== History ==
Thampalakkad has a land area of 5,000 acres (20 km^{2}) which was once the domain of Karisseril family and Kadakayam Family . This family's are the rulers of the area with all powers including capital punishment during the time prior to the British rule. All the powers were conferred to Karisseril family by the local kingdom Thekkumkoor, the capital of which was Changanacherry.

Some other popular families here include Kaippallil,Thekkumthottam, Thottuvayil, Naranathu, Vattakkattu (Kunnumpurathu), Kathayanatu, Parappallil, Mundakal etc.

== Economy ==
The villagers are predominantly rubber planters and government employees. Crops are mainly confined to rubber as it is every where in Kottayam district, even though plantations of nutmeg, tapioca, ginger etc. are seen in some parts.

== Worship centers and institutions ==
- Sri Mahadeva Temple
- St. Thomas Church
- Sri Mahakalipara Devi ടെംപ്ളേ
- Kadakayam Hanuman Temple
- Illathappan Kavu Temple
- NSS U P School
- Govt. LP School
- St. Reetha's LP School
- Sri Veda Vyasa School
- Post Office
- Kanjirapally Cooperative Bank
