= Pallickathodu =

- Nickname: Anickadu
- Location in Kerala, India Pallickathodu (India)
- Coordinates: 9°36′0″N 76°41′35″E
- Country: India
- State: Kerala
- District: Kottayam

Government
  - Type: Panchayath
  - Body: Pallickathodu grama panchayath

Area
  - Total: 22.46 km^{2} (8.67 sq mi)

Population (2011)
  - Total: 24,504
  - Density: 1,091/km^{2} (2,826/sq mi)

Languages
  - Official: Malayalam, English
- Time zone: UTC+5:30 (IST)
- PIN: 686503
- Telephone code: 0481
- Vehicle registration: KL-35, KL-34
- Nearest city: Kottayam, Pampady, Kanjirappally
- Lok Sabha constituency: Pathanamthitta

Pallickathodu, also spelled Pallikkathodu which includes Anickadu village, is a town in eastern Kottayam district, Kerala, India. It falls under the Kanjirappally assembly constituency.

== Notable temples ==
- Anickadu Bhagavathy Temple
- Sankara Narayana Moorthy Temple situated 1 km from town.
