= Puthiyakavu Devi Temple =

- പുതിയകാവ് ദേവിക്ഷേത്രം, പൊന്‍കുന്നം
- Location in Kerala

Religion
- Affiliation: Hinduism
- District: Kottayam
- Deity: Puthiyakavilamma

Location
- Location: Ponkunnam
- State: Kerala
- Country: India
- Interactive map of Puthiyakavu Devi Temple
- Coordinates: 9.5654973°N 76.7560479°E

Puthiyakavu Devi Temple is a temple in Ponkunnam, Kerala, India. It is a resting place for Sabarimala pilgrims.
