= Chenappady =

- village
- Location in Kerala, India Chenappady (India)
- Coordinates: 9.506866°N 76.796595°E
- Country: India
- State: Kerala
- District: Kottayam

Languages
  - Official: Malayalam, English
- Time zone: UTC+5:30 (IST)
- PIN: 686520
- Telephone code: 04828
- Vehicle registration: KL-34
- Nearest city: Kanjirappally, Erumely, Manimala

Chenappady is a small village on the foothills of the Sahyadri of Kerala, in the banks of Manimala River. It is located under the Kanjirappally locality which is 8 km (5.0 mi) from there. Chenappady is located near to Kanjirappally, Manimala, Ponkunnam and Erumely (All these town are almost the same distance away in a circle) . Chenappady Junction premises are called as Chenappady City/Kavala. CHENAPPADY KIZHAKKEKKARA SREE BHAGAVATHY TEMPLE is one of the oldest temples in the village. It was established by the THEKKUMKOOR DYNASTY IN AD 1100. Sri Dharma Shastha temple is another famous Ayyappa temple located in Chenappady.There is also a Sree Krishna temple Poothakuzhi near the kavala. Sabarimala temple is 65 km far from Chenappady. The rumoured Aerodrome in Erumely will be 6 Km from the Chenappady junction. There are 5 temples, 1 RC church, St Stephens CSI Church and 2 mosques.

During Aranmula Valla Sadya, Curd from Chenappady Sree Dharma Sastha temple is supplied to Aranmula Parthasarathy Temple.

Bank and Atms

There is one private bank (catholicate syrian bank), Cooperative Bank and one Atm (SBI) located in Chenappady junction premises.

Vehicles are registered under SRTO Kanjirappally (KL-34)

Schools and Colleges :

1) Govt LP School Alumood Chenappady

2) Govt NSS UP School Chenappady

3) RV Govt VHSS Vizhikkathod Chenappady

4) Santhom Public School Chenappady

5) St.Michael's U.P School Pazhayidom Chenappady

6) St. Antony's, Tharakanattukunnu

7) Hindustan College of Pharmacy, Chenappady
