= Kanamala =

Kanamala Pambavalley
- village
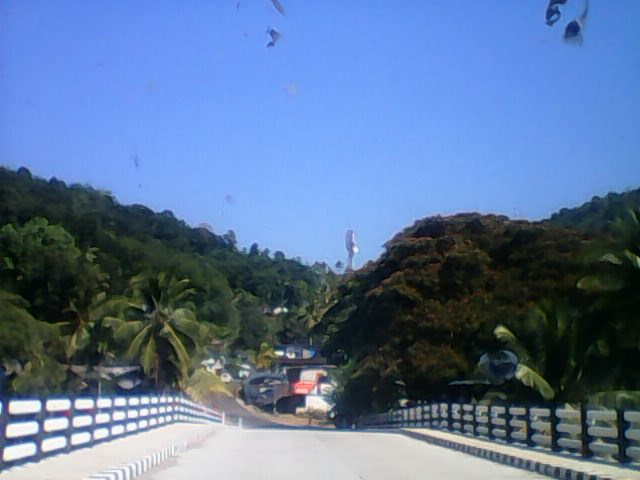
- The new bridge at Kanamala which links Kottayam and Pathanamthitta districts

- Location in Kerala, India
- Coordinates: 9°25′20″N 76°56′10″E
- Country: India
- State: Kerala
- District: Kottayam
- Named for: Kanamla causeway

Government
  - Type: Panchayath
  - Body: Erumely grama panchayath
- Elevation: 115 m (377 ft)

Population
  - Total: 998

Languages
  - Official: Malayalam
- Time zone: UTC+5:30 (IST)
- PIN: 686510
- Area code: 04828
- Vehicle registration: KL-34, KL-62
- Nearest cities: Erumely, Mukkoottuthara, Koruthodu
- Lok Sabha constituency: Pathanamthitta
- Assembly constituency: Poonjar
- Climate: Tropical monsoon
- Nearest Airport: Cochin International Airport Limited

Kanamala (/-ˈkʌnəmələ/), commonly known by the name Pambavalley, is a village in Erumely panchayath in Kanjirappally tehsil of Kottayam district in the Indian state of Kerala. It is situated in the border of Kottayam and Pathanamthitta districts, but officially recorded as a part of Kottayam district only.

== Etymology ==
The name Pambavalley derived from two words Pamba and valley, which denotes a place situated on the banks of holy Pamba river.

== Economy ==
Kanamala is a rural remote hilly area where rubber is the most cultivated crop. Many rubber plantations are located here. People also engages in small scale cultivation of pepper and tapioca.

== Landmarks ==
=== Kanamala bridge ===
There was a causeway linking Kottayam and Pathanamthitta Districts at Kanamala which was later replaced by the new bridge inaugurated on 23 December 2014, by Oomman Chandy. The construction cost of the bridge was ₹ 7.60 crore. The bridge here is an important landmark of Kanamala, which has two footpaths on either side. It has a length of 170 m (560 ft) and width of 11.23 m (36.8 ft). The bridge is a big relief for thousands of pilgrims and locals who earlier depended on the narrow causeway, which would often create traffic blocks and submerge in Pamba river during heavy rainfalls.

=== St.Mary's Clarist Convent ===
When Kanjirappally diocese came into being in 1977, the church authorities were quite aware of the need of having convents in its backward and not easily accessible hilly regions. Hence with great pleasure, Mar Joseph Powathil, the first Bishop of Kanjirappally granted permission to start an FC convent at Kanamala. Thus St. Mary's Clarist Convent came into existence on 18 June 1978. The house was blessed by Mar Joseph Powathil. A tailoring centre for giving vocational training to the poor girls of the locality started functioning under the guidance of the sisters on 15 July 1978. A nursery school was also started in the same year considering the request of the people around. Now the sisters are active in teaching, parish service, and social welfare activities. There is also a St. Thomas Church near to the convent which came into existence in 1956 under the Kanjirappally diocese.

== Transport facilities ==
Kanamala is connected by both state highway and rural roads. Sabarimala, a pilgrim centre, is 33 km (21 mi) from there. Both state-run and private buses operates there. Bus services are commonly from places like Mukkoottuthara, Erumely, Koruthodu, Mundakkayam, Changanassery and Kottayam. During Sabarimala pilgrimage, thousands of pilgrims passes through Kanamala via Neriyamangalam-Pamba state highway (SH-44).

=== Kanamala ===
During the Mandalam-Makaravilakku period, many fatal accidents took place at Kanamala causeway and Attivalavu spots. In the last five years, over 25 persons have died there. Kanamala had victimed several severe and minor accidents during the recent years.

== Schools and Colleges ==
- ST.Thomas U.P School, Kanamala
- San Thome H.S.S, Kanamala
- M.E.S College, Mukkoottuthara

== Nearby places ==
- Thulappally
- Umikuppa
- Edakadathy
- Eruthuvapuzha
- Mookkenpetty
- Vattappara
- Mukkoottuthara
- Aarattukayam
- Angelvalley
- Moolakkayam
- Kisumam
