= Koottickal =

- Village
- Location in Kerala, India Koottickal (India)
- Coordinates: 9°34′0″N 76°52′0″E
- Country: India
- State: Kerala
- District: Kottayam

Languages
  - Official: Malayalam, English
- Time zone: UTC+5:30 (IST)
- PIN: 686514
- Vehicle registration: KL-34
- Nearest City: Mundakayam / Kanjirappally
- Lok Sabha Constituency: Pathanamthitta
- Kerala Legislature Constituency: Poonjar

Koottickal is a town at the base of Western Ghats mountain ranges in the Kottayam district, in the state of Kerala. It is 2,000 feet (610 m) above sea level and is situated on the eastern border of Kottayam District, 55 km from Kottayam, and around 5 km away from Mundakayam on the NH 220 (Kottayam–Kumily Road). The Muthukora Hills are nearby.

== Location ==
This village is situated on the banks of Manimala River; Kuttikkanam, Peermade and Thekkady Forest Reserve are close by.

== History ==
In October 2021, massive landslides destroyed around 300 homes, 100 shops and killed 13 people.

== Economy ==
Rubber is a prime crop in Koottickal, one of the first places in India where it was cultivated.

== Transportation ==
The nearest airport is Cochin International Airport. The nearest railway station is Kottayam.
