= Panamattom =

- Village
- Interactive map of Panamattom
- Coordinates: 9.60°N 76.74°E
- Country: India
- State: Kerala
- District: Kottayam
- Taluk: Kanjirappally

Government
  - Type: Democracy
  - Body: Panchayat
- Elevation: 16 m (52 ft)

Population (2012)
  - Total: 10,032

Languages
  - Official: Malayalam, English
- Time zone: UTC+5:30 (IST)
- PIN: 686522
- Telephone code: 04828
- Vehicle registration: KL 34, KL 05

Panamattom or Panamattam is a large village in Kerala, India, a part of Kottayam district. It is located in Kanjirappally Taluk. Ponkunnam, Kanjirappally and Pala are nearby places of Panamattom. This place is famous for its fertile land and also rubber plantations. The main village Panchayat is Elikkulam Panchayat.

== Geography ==
Panamattom is located at 9°35′N 76°44′E.

== Climate ==
Panamattom has a good climate. In winter season, it is little bit cold (25°Celsius high 21°Celsius low) and in summer season, it is little hot (30°Celsius high 26°Celsius low). Panamattom has mostly the monsoon climate.

== Temples ==
Religion in Panamattom
Religion	Percent
Hindu	94.3%
Christian	3.5%
Islam	2.2%

- Panamattom Devi Temple is a famous temple located in Panamattom . Shiva, Parvati and Bhadrakali are being worshiped in Panamattom Devi Temple. Every Year, festivals are being celebrated here.
- In Panamattom, there are many tharavad (traditional houses)in earlier days. One such tharavad in here is called Kuzhikkattu tharavadu. In behind of this tharavad, there is a temple called Kuzhikattu temple.
- Vadakara Temple is also located in Panamattom. It is one of the oldest temples in Kottayam district.
- Veliyannur Temple is also situated in Panamattom. This is also one of the famous temples in Kottayam district. Lord Ayyappa is being worshipped here.
- Kaniyanparambil Temple was also located in Panamattom in earlier days. But today, we can find only its trace.

== Accessibility ==
2nd mile Bus Stop is just 1 km away from Panamattom. Daily, there are many buses passing Pallickathode, Ponkunnam, Kanjirappally, Changanassery, Kottayam etc. Kottayam Railway Station (37 km), Changanassery Railway Station (40 km), Kuruppumthara Railway Station (42 km), Kaduthuruthy Railway Station (45 km) and Thiruvalla Railway Station (47 km) are the nearest railway stations of Panamattom. Most preferable one is Kottayam. The nearest airport is Cochin International Airport (88 km).
