= Kanamala Bridge =

Bridge connecting Kottayam and Pathanamthitta districts

Kanamala Bridge കണമല പാലം
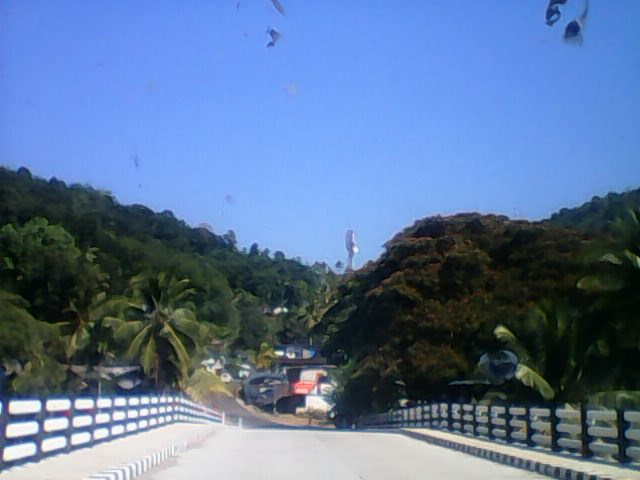
- Kanamala bridge
- Coordinates: 9°25′15″N 76°56′09″E
- Carries: Motor vehicles, pedestrians
- Crosses: Pamba
- Locale: Kanamala, Kerala
- Other name: Pambavalley Bridge

Characteristics
- Material: Concrete
- Total length: 170 m (560 ft)
- Width: 11.23 m (36.8 ft)
- No. of lanes: 2

History
- Opened: 23 December 2014

Location
- Interactive map of Kanamala Bridge

Kanamala Bridge is a concrete bridge in Kanamala, Kerala that connects Kottayam and Pathanamthitta districts through Pamba River. The bridge was opened for public on 23 December 2014.

The bridge has a length of 170 m (560 ft) and width of 11.23 m (36.8 ft).
