= Parthasarathy Temple, Mundakkayam =

Sri Parthasarathy Temple Mundakkayam
- ശ്രീ പാർത്ഥസാരഥി ക്ഷേത്രം മുണ്ടക്കയം
- Sri Parthasarathy Temple, Mundakkayam, Kottayam, Kerala

Religion
- Affiliation: Hinduism
- District: Kottayam
- Deity: Krishna as Parthasarathy
- Festival: Thiruvutsavam in Makaram
- Governing body: Travancore Devaswom Board

Location
- Location: Mundakkayam
- State: Kerala
- Country: India
- Interactive map of Sri Parthasarathy Temple Mundakkayam
- Coordinates: 9°32′21.5″N 76°53′12.0″E

Architecture
- Type: Traditional Kerala style

Specifications
- Temple: One
- Elevation: 115.64 m (379 ft)

Sri Parthasarathy Temple is a Hindu temple located in Mundakkayam town in Kanjirappally taluk of Kottayam district in the Indian state of Kerala. It is situated on the road to Kuttikkanam, about 52 km from Kottayam and 20 km from Kuttikkanam.

== Deity ==
Lord Parthasarathy (Krishna as the charioteer of Arjuna) is the principal deity here, accompanied by sub deities like Ganapathi, Ayyappa, Nagaraja and Yakshi.

== Ritual ==
Three poojas are held daily. The morning section starts with 'Ushspooja'. The noon section includes 'Uchapooja. 'Athazhapooja' concludes the desk section.

== Festival ==
The annual festival is hosted in the Malayalam month of Makaram (i.e. January/February) lasting 6 days. The festivities are commenced by ceremonial flag hoisting or Kodiyettam on the first day.
