= Vizhikkithodu =

- Village
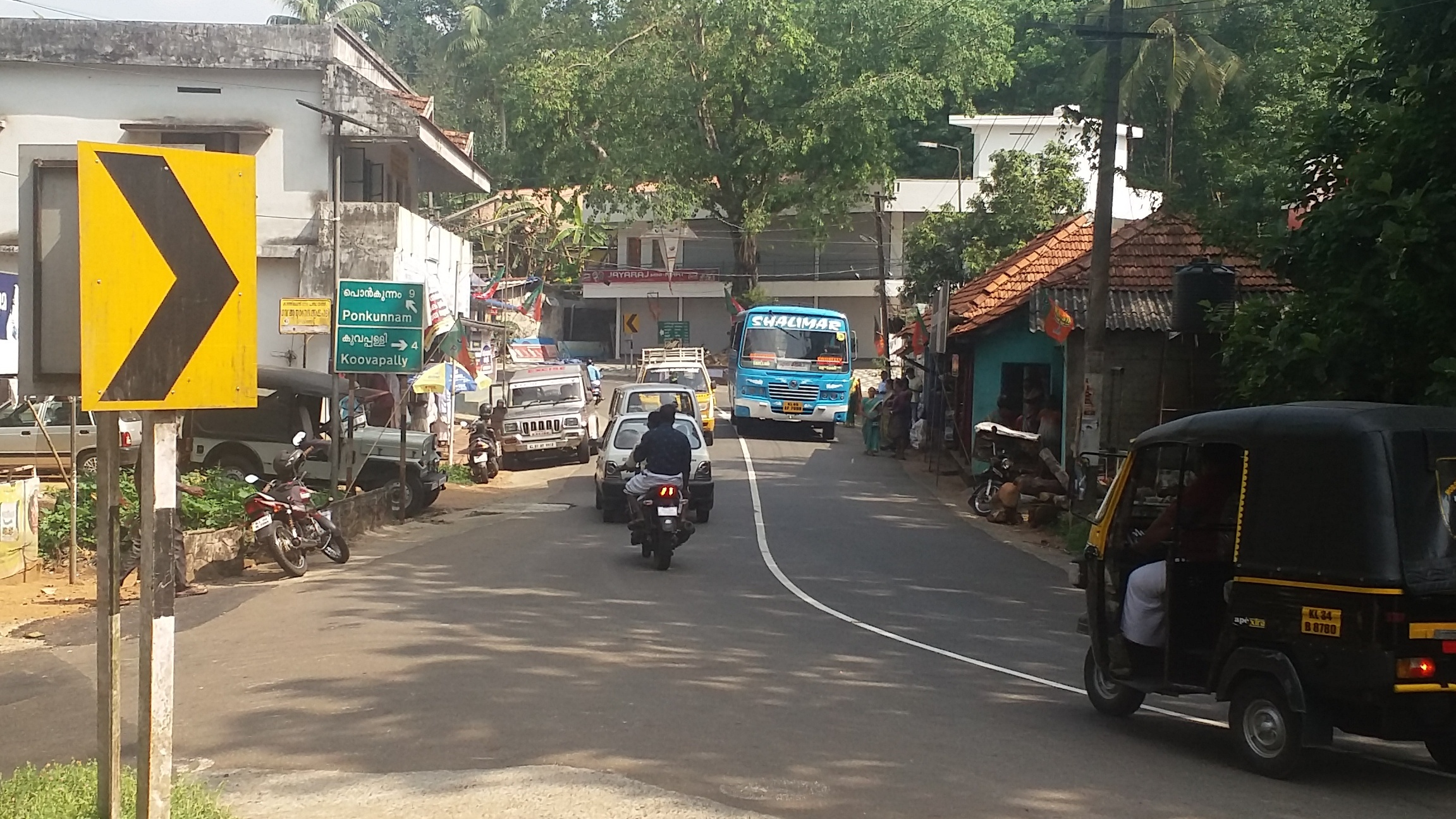
- Vizhikkithodu Junction

- Vizhikkithodu in Kerala
- Coordinates: 9.513479°N 76.810567°E
- County: India
- State: Kerala
- District: Kottayam

Languages
  - Official: Malayalam, English
- Time zone: UTC+5:30 (IST)
- PIN: 686518
- Vehicle registration: KL-34
- Nearest Towns: Kanjirapally, Ponkunnam, Erumeli

Vizhikkithodu is a village located on the banks of river Manimala in Kanjirapally panchayath in Kottayam district of Kerala. Kanjirapally is the nearest town to this village and is located at a distance of 6 km. The Ponkunnam-Erumeli Road, which is one of the main roads for Sabarimala pilgrims passes through this village.

== Cultural centers ==
Two libraries are working in Vizhikkithodu to provide readership and knowledge to the people of the village. The main library is the PYMA Library. This library contains more than 2,000 book collections, reading hall, conference hall and library for children.

== Educational institutions ==
A government higher secondary school runs at this village. The school was founded in 1917.

== Health centers ==
A primary health center and a government Ayurvedic dispensary are located in the village.

== Places of worship ==
Chenappady Sreedharma Sastha Temple and Ilaankavu Bhagavathi Temple are the major Hindu shrines in the village. St. Mary's Church is the main Christian church in the village.
