= Kozhuvanal =

- town/village
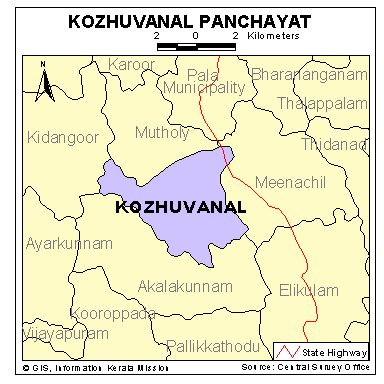
- Village Map
- Interactive map of Kozhuvanal
- Coordinates: 9.655014°N 76.664207°E
- Country: India
- State: Kerala
- District: Kottayam

Government
  - Body: Gram Panchayat
  - President: Nimmy twinkleraj vakkappulath

Area
  - Total: 21.012 km^{2} (8.113 sq mi)

Population (2001)
  - Total: 12,550
  - Density: 597.3/km^{2} (1,547/sq mi)

Languages
  - Official: Malayalam, English
- Time zone: UTC+5:30 (IST)
- PIN: 686573
- Telephone code: 04822
- Vehicle registration: KL-35
- Nearest city: Pala
- Sex ratio: 1060 ♂/♀
- Literacy: 99%%
- Lok Sabha constituency: Kottayam
- Vidhan Sabha constituency: Pala
- Civic agency: Gram Panchayat
- Climate: monsoon rains from June - November and summer from December to May (Köppen)
- Website: www.lsg.kerala.gov.in

Kozhuvanal is a town in Meenachil, in the district of Kottayam, state of Kerala, India.

== Location ==
Kozhuvanal is surrounded by Akalakunnam panchayath in south and west, Meenachil in east, Mutholy and Kidangoor in north. It has amenities including schools, post offices, hospital, churches, temples and stationary shops. State Bank Of Travancore, South Indian Bank, Cooperative Bank, Muthoot Financial Corporation and Kosamattam Financiers have branches in Kozhuvanal.

== Panchayath ==
Kozhuvanal Panchayat has received many awards including the Nirmal Award. It is the first Panchayat in the state to be completely electrified and irrigated. The Panchayat office and the town centre are situated here.

== Transportation ==
Kozhuvanal is connected by road to all neighbouring village centres and to the nearest town, Pala. Towns like Kottayam, Kanjirappally, Ponkunnam and Changanacherry are easily accessible from this place by several local roads and highways. The Cherpunkal-Kozhuvanal Road is famous because of the traffic and of the tourist buses. There is also the Kerala State Road Transport Corporation from Pala to Kozhuvanal Bus Stop.

== Schools ==
- St John Nephusians's HSS, Kozhuvanal, Kottayam(05076)
