= Elamgulam =

Elamgulam ഇളങ്ങുളം
- village
- Interactive map of Elamgulam
- Coordinates: 9°38′0″N 76°42′0″E
- Country: India
- State: Kerala
- District: Kottayam

Population (2011)
  - Total: 14,083

Languages
  - Official: Malayalam, English
- Time zone: UTC+5:30 (IST)
- PIN: 686522
- Telephone code: 04828
- Vehicle registration: KL-34
- Nearest city: Kochi
- Literacy: 99.98%
- Lok Sabha constituency: Kottayam
- Vidhan Sabha constituency: Pala
- Climate: Moderate (Köppen)

Elamgulam is a large village in Kottayam district in the state of Kerala, India under the Pala Assembly constituency. The village comes under the local jurisdiction of Elikkulam Grama Panchayat.

== Demographics ==
As of 2011 India census, Elangulam had a population of 14083.

== Demographics ==
Elamgulam has been a multi-ethnic and multi-religious village in the district of Kottayam for over the years. Hindus and Syrian Christians together account for most of the population of Elamgulam. The Hindu community is mainly concentrated in the Koorali area of the village. Elamgulam Sree Dharma Shastha Temple is famous in Kerala for Gajamela. The Sree Dharmasastha Kshetram is one of the centres for the pilgrims on the way to Sabarimala. The Syrian Christians of Elangulam owe their faith to St. Thomas the Apostle and are staunch believers of the Catholic Church. The community, belonging to the Kanjirapally Diocese of the Syro-Malabar Church is the most prominent community of the region in socioeconomic terms. They are engaged in farming, mostly cultivation of cash crops such as Rubber. The Muslim community is mainly confined to the Panamattom area of the village. People from across the religions are having close-knit relations and are living in peace and harmony.

== Economy ==
The economy of Elangulam village is mainly based on agriculture. A major part of the population depends on agriculture for their livelihood. Rubber is the main cash crop. Coconuts, coca, pepper, vanilla and coffee are other major cultivation. Major industries related to the processing of rubber latex and manufacturing of rubber products are also located in the village and the nearby town of Ponkunnam. The majority of the people in the village are financially well off as they follow a very strong agricultural values.

== Main Eastern Highway ==
The Pala-Ponkunnam Road, which winds through Elangulam is part of the Main Eastern Highway. Elangulam is 5 km north of Ponkunnam and 17 km south of Pala.

== Religious Institutions ==
Elamgulam Sree Dharma Sastha Temple Utsavam, is one of the famous festivals in central Travancore. As usual apart from traditional ceremonies in the temple, various cultural programs also are performed by famous artists. The main attractions of the festival are Gajarajasangamam (Elephant Gathering), Anayoottu and Kudamattam which attracts thousands of people. Elamgulam Shree Mutharamman Kovil is yet another landmark of the area.

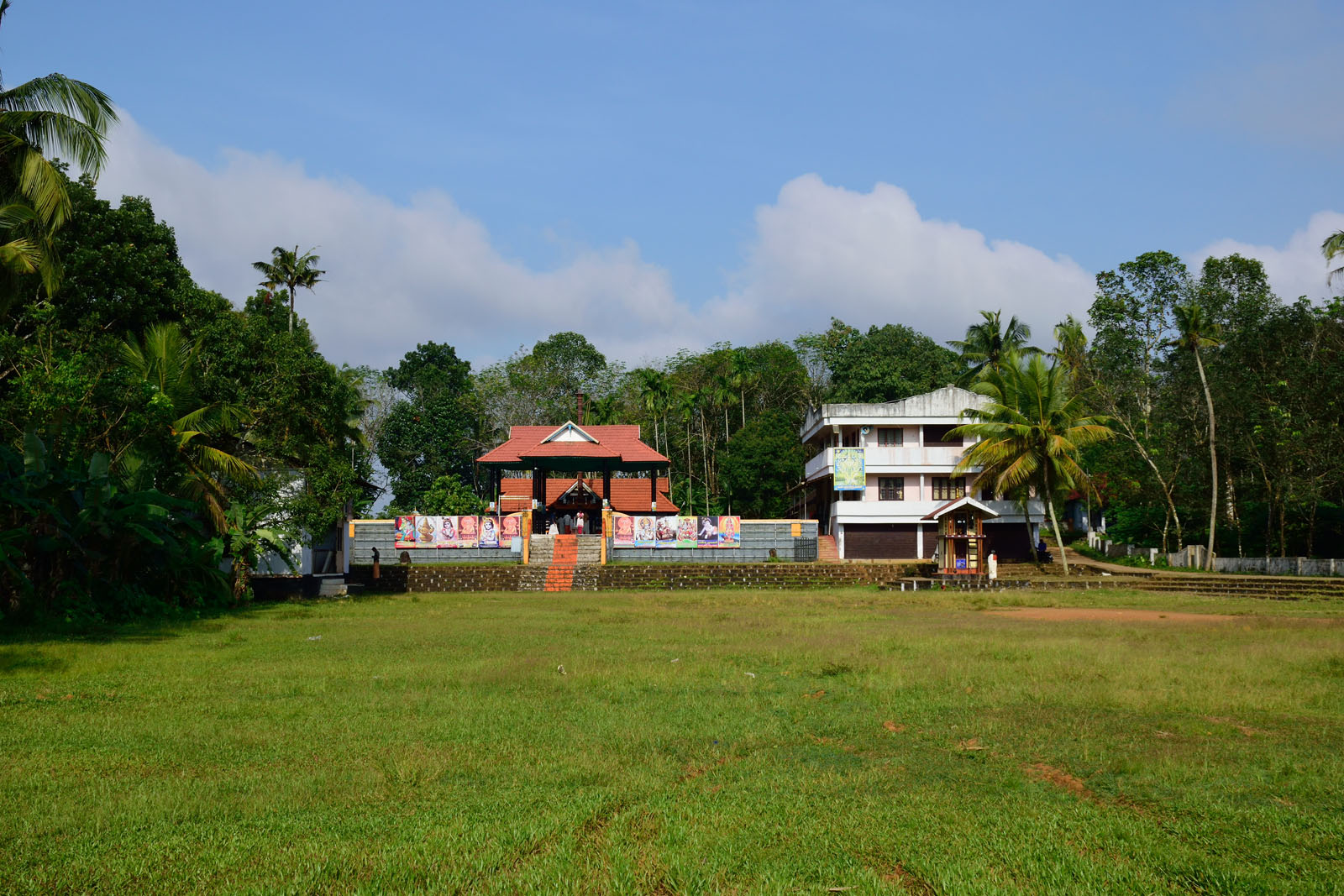
Elamgulam Sree Dharma Sastha Temple

St Mary's Syro Malabar Church , Elangulam lies on the Pala-Ponkunnam road in Kottayam District. Consecrated in 1895, the church is dedicated to the Holy Virgin Mary. The church features a cemetery and the Koorali Chapel . A High School is also run by the church. The parish has many devotional societies. The annual church feast is normally held during the last week of December.

== Educational Institutions ==
- St. Mary's High School, Elangulam
- KVLP school, Elamgulam
- Sree Dharma Sastha Devaswom L P School Elangulam

== Banking Institutions ==
The State Bank of India branch is located in Koorali junction. The Elangulam Service Cooperative Bank offers their services to the people of Elangulam as well. IFSC Code of State Bank of India Elamgulam SBIN0070360
