= Moozhayil Sankaranarayana Temple =

Hindu temple in Kottayam district, Kerala

Moozhayil Sankaranarayana Temple, Anicad
- Moozhayil Sankaranarayana Temple, Anickadu, Kottayam, Kerala

Religion
- Affiliation: Hinduism
- District: Kottayam
- Deity: Sankaranarayana
- Festivals: Krishna Janmashtami, Maha Shivaratri

Location
- Location: Anickadu
- State: Kerala
- Country: India
- Coordinates: 9°35′37.5″N 76°41′13.1″E

Architecture
- Type: Architecture of Kerala

Specifications
- Temple: One
- Elevation: 110.87 m (364 ft)

Moozhayil Sankaranarayana Temple is a Hindu temple dedicated to Sankaranarayana, a combined form of the Hindu deities Shiva and Vishnu, located in Anickadu village in Kottayam district, Kerala, India. The temple follows the traditional Kerala style of temple architecture and is associated with festivals including Krishna Janmashtami and Maha Shivaratri. It is regarded as one of 7 Sankaranarayana temples of Kerala.

== See also ==
- Navaikkulam Sankaranarayana temple in Thiruvananthapuram district
- Thiruvegapura Sree Sankaranarayana Temple in Palakkad district
- Panamanna Sankaranarayanaswami Temple in Palakkad district
- Ramanthali Sankaranarayana Swamy Temple in Kannur district
- Ala Sree Sankaranarayana Swamy Temple in Thrissur district
- Puthukode Sree Sankara Narayana Temple in Malappuram district
