= Thiruvambady Airport =

Proposed Airport in Kerala

Coordinates: 11°21′39″N 76°00′32″E

- IATA: none; ICAO: none

Summary
- Airport type: Public
- Serves: Kozhikode, Malappuram
- Location: Thiruvambady, Kerala, India
- Interactive map of Thiruvambady Airport

Thiruvambady Airport is a proposed airport project near Thiruvambady, about 35 km (22 mi) from Kozhikode City, 21 km from Markaz Knowledge City and 46 km from Malappuram city in the state of Kerala in India. The State Government of Kerala has directed the district collectors of Kozhikode and Malappuram districts to conduct and submit a viability report of the project.

The Calicut International Airport at Karipur, which currently serves the region cannot be expanded because it is located on a table top. Hence, the Airport Authority of India (AAI), which operates the airport has declined to resume wide-body aircraft operations leading to a reduction in revenues from passenger traffic and cargo transport. This led local Trade and Commerce organisations to seek out other alternatives to maintain the growth of aviation in the region. The AAI then recommended that the state government submit a proposal to AAI for a greenfield airport at Tiruvambadi. According to the Kozhikode-based Malabar Development Council (MDC), if the State Government is willing to clear the project, several investors are keen on investing in it.

== See also ==
- List of airports in Kerala
