= Poovarany =

- village
- Location in Kerala, India Poovarany (India)
- Coordinates: 9°40′0″N 76°41′0″E
- Country: India
- State: Kerala
- District: Kottayam

Languages
  - Official: Malayalam, English
- Time zone: UTC+5:30 (IST)
- Postal code: 686577
- Telephone code: 04822
- Vehicle registration: KL-35
- Nearest city: Palai
- Literacy: 99%%

Poovarany is a village in Meenachil Pachayath, Palai, Kottayam district, Kerala, India. The name poovarany means jungle of flowers.

Most of the people belong to Syrian Malabar Nasrani and Hindu communities. The Sacred Heart Church and Sree Mahadeva temple are the main religious centers.

Two small rivers, the Cheruthode and Valiyathodu, flow through the area.The land around Poovarany is well-suited for cultivation. Rubber, pepper, coconut, paddy, ginger, and turmeric are common items produced here.

Ponkunnam and Palai are the nearest towns. The village is close to the pilgrimage center Bharananganam.
