= Koovappally =

- village
- Location in Kerala, India Koovappally (India)
- Coordinates: 9°31′0″N 76°49′0″E
- Country: India
- State: Kerala
- District: Kottayam

Population (2011)
  - Total: 6,447

Languages
  - Official: Malayalam, English
- Time zone: UTC+5:30 (IST)
- PIN: 686518
- Telephone code: 04828
- Vehicle registration: KL-34
- Nearest city: Kanjirappally, Erumely

Koovappally is a small village under Kanjirappally Taluk in the Kottayam district of Kerala, India. It is best known for its rubber industry. There are four educational institutions including one engineering college. Koovappally postal code is 686518.The nearest town is Kanjirappally. The villagers of the town are predominantly Christian, Hindu and Muslim. One of the landmark is Amal Jyothi College of Engineering Kanjirappally.

== History ==
Koovappally, was largely an uninhabited region at the start of the 20th century, and covered by thick forests. The agrarian expansion of the early 1900s brought many Syrian Catholic Christian families from Kanjirapally town and the nearby regions, who colonized the areas in and around Koovappally. They set up farmlands of coconut, paddy and spices, which were later turned into rubber plantations. More people - Hindus, Muslims and Christians migrated to the area, whose livelihoods were directly and indirectly linked with agriculture. The Cathedral Church at Kanjirapally owns hundreds of acres of rubber plantation around Koovappally, including the 'Koovappally Kurissumala'.

== Demographics ==
As of the 2011 census, the population of Koovappally is 6,447.

== Churches ==
- St. Joseph's Church, Koovappally
- St. Joseph's CMS Anglican Church, Pallyppadi, Koovappally
- Fathima Matha Church, Karikulam
- Koovappally Kurishumala, Under Kanjirappally St. Dominics Cathedral
- St. Thomas Syro Malabar Church Poomattom, Koorumthook, Koovappally

== Temple ==
Njarkalakkavu Sreedhrama Sastha Temple, Koovappally

== Educational institutions ==
- St. Joseph U.P School
- St. Joseph High School
- Govt Technical High School
- Assumption High School Palampra
- Amal Jyothi College of Engineering

== Business Around Koovappally ==
Season Rubbers Pvt. Ltd.

Royal Latex Pvt. Ltd.

St. Marys Rubbers Pvt. Ltd.

Nanobird Technologies Pvt. Ltd.
