= Edakadathy =

- village
- Location in Kerala, India Edakadathy (India)
- Coordinates: 9°24′49.43″N 76°57′40.41″E
- Country: India
- State: Kerala
- District: Kottayam

Government
  - Type: Panchayath
  - Body: Erumely grama panchayath
- Elevation: 102 m (335 ft)

Languages
  - Official: Malayalam, English
- Time zone: UTC+5:30 (IST)
- PIN: 686510
- Area code: 04828
- Vehicle registration: KL-34, KL-62
- Coastline: 0 kilometres (0 mi)
- Nearest city: Erumely
- Lok Sabha constituency: Pathanamthitta
- Climate: Tropical monsoon (Köppen)
- Avg. summer temperature: 35 °C (95 °F)
- Avg. winter temperature: 20 °C (68 °F)

Edakadathy is a village located near Mukkoottuthara in Erumely gram panchayat, Kottayam district, Kerala, India. It is situated near the border of Kottayam district and Pathanamthitta district, but officially recorded as a part of the former. It is located on the northern bank of Pamba River.
