= Rosemary (poet) =

Indian poet and translator

- Born: Maria Goretti; 22 June 1956 (age 70); Kanjirappally, Kottayam district, Kerala, India
- Occupations: Poet, Translator
- Spouse: Priyan Chacko Ommen
- Children: 3
- Parent(s): K. C. Chacko; Rosamma
- Writing career
- Notable awards: Kerala Sahitya Akademi Award for Overall Contributions

Rosemary is a Malayalam language poet and translator from Kerala, India. She has received many awards including Kerala Sahitya Akademi Award for Overall Contributions in 2019. Her autobiography, Nilaavil Oru Panineerchampa was published in 2021.

== Biography ==
Rosemary, born Maria Goretti, was born on 22 June 1956, in Kanjirappally, Kottayam district, to K. C. Chacko (Pappachan) and Rosamma. She changed her name to Rosemary herself because of the difficulty of pronouncing her birth name. She completed her school education at Gracie Memorial School, Parathode, and continued her studies at St. Dominic's College, Kanjirapally, Mar Ivanios College, Thiruvananthapuram, Chidambaram Annamalai University and Thiruvananthapuram Press Club to secure a Master's Degree in English Literature and a Diploma in Journalism. She has worked in the editorial department of the Mathrubhumi daily and as a television correspondent for India Today (Malayalam).

Rosemary lives in Thiruvananthapuram.

== Literary career ==
Rose Mary, who Poet Madhavikutty considered as her successor, published her first poetry collection, Vakkukal Chekkerunnidam published in 1996. Although she declares herself to be a feminist, she believes her writings do not reflect feminist leanings. She has been a member of several committees such as the Sahitya Akademi Advisory Board and the Central Board of Film Certification.

== Bibliography ==
=== Poetry collection ===
- Vakkukal Chekkerunnidam (in Malayalam). Kottayam: DC books. 1996. ISBN 9788171306855.
- Chanju Peyyunna Mazha (in Malayalam). Kottayam: Current Books. 1998. ISBN 9788124014660.
- Venalil Oru Puzha (in Malayalam). Kottayam: Current Books. 2002. ISBN 9788124013267.
- Lajavanthi Ennoruval (in Malayalam). Mathrubhumi Books. 2019. ISBN 9788182680074.

=== Translations ===
- Hamelinile Kuzhaloothukaranum Mattu Kathakalum -6 (in Malayalam). Kerala State Bala Sahitya Institute. 2012. ISBN 9788184942286. Children's' literature.
- Choolam Kuthunna Rakshanum Mattukathakalum - 5 (in Malayalam). Kerala State Bala Sahitya Institute. 2012. ISBN 9788184942279. Children's' literature.
- Talathirinja Pannikoottam Mattu Kathakalum - 4 (in Malayalam). Kerala State Bala Sahitya Institute. 2012. ISBN 9788184942262. Children's' literature.
- Uchum Kurukkanum Mattukathakalum - 3 (in Malayalam). Kerala State Bala Sahitya Institute. 2010. ISBN 9788184942255. Children's' literature.
- Thambaleenayum Mattu Kathakalum-2 (in Malayalam). Kerala State Bala Sahitya Institute. 2012. ISBN 9788184942248. Children's' literature.
- Chenthoppiyaninja Penkuttyyum Mattu Kathakalum 1 (in Malayalam). Kerala State Bala Sahitya Institute. 2012. ISBN 9788184942231. Children's' literature.
- Rip Van Winkilum Mattu Kathakalum (in Malayalam). Kerala State Bala Sahitya Institute. 2012. ISBN 9788182662131. Children's' literature.
- Lokothara BalaKathakal, Malayalam translation of Children's' literature stories from around the world.
- Lokaprasaktha Nadodi Kathakal, Malayalam translation of famous folk stories from around the world.
- Bible Kathakal, Malayalam translation of stories from holy Bible.
- Kahlil Gibran Kavithakal, Malayalam translation of Kahlil Gibran poems.
- She has translated V. K. Krishna Menon's biography into Malayalam.

=== Memoirs ===
- Vrichikakaattu Veeshumbol (in Malayalam) (4 ed.). Kottayam: DC Books. 2020. ISBN 9788124013960.
- Jalakakkazhcha (in Malayalam). Pusthaka Prasadhaka Sangham. 2020. ISBN 9780000131072.
- IvideInganeyum Oral
- Chempaka Ennoru Pappathi

=== Autobiography ===
- Nilaavil Oru Panineerchampa (in Malayalam). Mathrubhumi Books. 2021. ISBN 9789390574759.

== Awards and honors ==
Rosemary received 4th Esenin Award by Esenin Museum, Moscow, the Foundation Russkiy Mir and Russian Cultural Centre, Thiruvananthapuram, in 2012, for introducing many Russian works to Malayalam language. In 2019, She received Kerala Sahitya Akademi Award for Overall Contributions. She is also a recipient of SBT Poetry Award, Muthukulam Parvathy Amma Award and Lalithambika Antharjanam Young Writer Award.
