= List of airports in Kerala =

Kerala state has four operational international airports as of 2024, which makes it an Indian state with most international airports alongside Tamil Nadu. Kerala is also the only state with the closest proximity to multiple international/domestic airports in the country. All four international airports lie in very close proximity, which makes it easy for the people in Kerala to access air travel. The state also has four defence airports that are widely used by the Indian Armed Forces. Airports in Kerala provide domestic transport, support tourism in Kerala and also serve the high number of expatriates belonging to the state. The presently operating airports in the state of Kerala are as follows:

- Trivandrum International Airport in Shankumugham in state capital of Thiruvananthapuram district
- Cochin International Airport in Nedumbassery in Ernakulam district
- Calicut International Airport in Karipur in Malappuram district
- Kannur International Airport in Mattanur in Kannur district.

The first airport was started in Quilon during the 1920s but ceased operation when an accident involving a training aircraft at the boundary of the aerodrome resulted in the death of the pilot and the trainee. There are two defence airports also situated in Kerala, each being operated by the Indian Navy and Indian Air Force. There is also a proposed Sabarimala Greenfield International Airport in Kottayam district.

Cities served	ICAO	IATA	Airport name	Category	Ownership	Passenger terminals	Runway length (m)	Status	Image
Kannur, Wayanad, Madikeri (Karnataka)	VOKN	CNN	Kannur International Airport	International	PPP	1	3,050	Operational	
Kannur, Wayanad, Madikeri (Karnataka)	—	—	INA Ezhimala	Defence	Indian Navy			Operational	
Kannur, Wayanad, Madikeri (Karnataka)	—	—	Kannur Territory Aerodrome	Defence	Indian Army			Operational	
Kochi, Thrissur, Palakkad	VOCI	COK	Cochin International Airport	International	PPP	4	3,445	Operational	
Kochi, Thrissur, Palakkad	VOCC	—	INS Garuda	Defence	Indian Navy			Operational	
Kollam	—	—	Kollam Airport	Domestic	Travancore Kingdom			Closed	
Kottayam, Pathanamthitta	—	—	Sabarimala International Greenfield Airport	Future	PPP			Future	
Idukki	—	—	Sathram Airstrip	Airstrip	NCC (India)			Operational	
Malappuram, Kozhikode, Palakkad	VOCL	CCJ	Kozhikode International Airport	International	AAI	1	2,860	Operational	
Kozhikode	—	—	Thiruvambady International Airport	Future	PPP				
Thiruvananthapuram, Kollam, Pathanamthitta, Kanyakumari (Tamil Nadu)	VOTV	TRV	Thiruvananthapuram International Airport	International	PPP (Owner: AAI Operator: ATIAL Adani Group)	2	3,407	Operational	
Thiruvananthapuram, Kollam, Pathanamthitta, Kanyakumari (Tamil Nadu)	—	—	Southern Air Command	Defence	Indian Air Force			Operational	
Kasargod	—	—	Bekal Airport	Future				Future	
Kozhikode, Malappuram	—	—	Chelari Airport	Domestic	Birla Group			Closed	
