= Vandanpathal =

- village
- Location in Kerala, India Vandanpathal (India)
- Coordinates: 9°32′0″N 76°53′0″E
- Country: India
- State: Kerala
- District: Kottayam

Government
  - Type: Panchayath
  - Body: Mundakayam Grama Panchayath

Languages
  - Official: Malayalam, English
- Time zone: UTC+5:30 (IST)
- PIN: 686513
- Vehicle registration: KL-34
- Nearest city: Mundakayam
- Civic agency: Mundakayam Grama Panchayath

Vandanpathal is a small village located in the district of Kottayam, Kerala, India.

== Economy ==
The main occupation is agriculture, especially the cash crop, rubber. When the latex price crashed, many farmers switched to vanilla. Apart from rubber, other major crops include coriander, ginger and tapioca. It is 2 km away from Mundakayam. St. Paul's church is in the village. Four decades prior, it was a forest area. (Kaipuzha)

== Schools ==
- St. Paul's L.P School Vandanpathal
- Vandanpathal Anganvadi

== Geography ==
The village is surrounded by thick green vegetation, with the Travancore Rubber & Tea (TR&T) rubber plantation on one side and a teak plantation on the other. The river draws border line between, Kottayam and Idukki districts.

== Communication and transport ==
Most of the villagers own a telephone connection and are connected to the rest of the world through television. There are more than 50 channels, both local and foreign made available to the viewers of the locality by a cable operator named newvision based in Puthanchantha. Most of the residents depend on public transport. Private buses connecting Koruthodu and Mundakayam passes through Vandanpathal.

== Economy ==
Economy is agrarian in context but many people are working in overseas. Also the place have three or four rehabilitation settlements popularly known as colonies. Also plantation given by the govt of Kerala during post independent era to the educated youth to promote agriculture is in this area. Also the small plantation called Chakkithottam owned by a lady called Chakki was in this area. Chakkithottam was sold off later and now it is owned by different families as agriculture land

== Religion ==
Vandanpathal is known for its religious harmony and political activism.

There is a church is in Vandanpathal named St. Paul's Church as well as a mosque and a Sree Narayana Dharma Paripalana Yogam (S.N.D.P) temple.
