= Anicad Sree Bhagavathi Temple =

- Anicad Sree Bhagavathy Temple, Anickadu, Kottayam, Kerala

Religion
- Affiliation: Hinduism
- District: Kottayam
- Deity: Bhagavathy
- Festival: Kalamezhuthupaattu

Location
- Location: Anickadu
- State: Kerala
- Country: India
- Interactive map of Anicad Sree Bhagavathi Temple
- Coordinates: 9°36′09.4″N 76°41′02.1″E

Architecture
- Type: Architecture of Kerala

Specifications
- Temple: One
- Elevation: 122.75 m (403 ft)

Anicad Sree Bhagavathi Temple is a well-known Hindu temple of the goddess Bhadrakali located at Anicad, Kottayam, Kerala, India. The temple is located on top of a hill.

== Patrons ==
Here Bhadrakali is residing as Bala Badrakali. Bala badrakali is the young age of Kali devi. The deity installed as a mirror image facing east side. Shiva, Muruga, Ganapathy and Sasthavu are the sub deities here.

== Festivals ==
Three pujas done daily. 'Kalamezhuthupaattu' which starts from Avittam to Aswathy of Malayalam month of Meenam is the main the festival of this temple.
