= Elamgulam Sree Dharma Shastha Temple =

Elamgulam Sree Dharma Sastha Temple
- ഇളങ്ങുളം ശ്രീധർമ്മശാസ്താ ക്ഷേത്രം
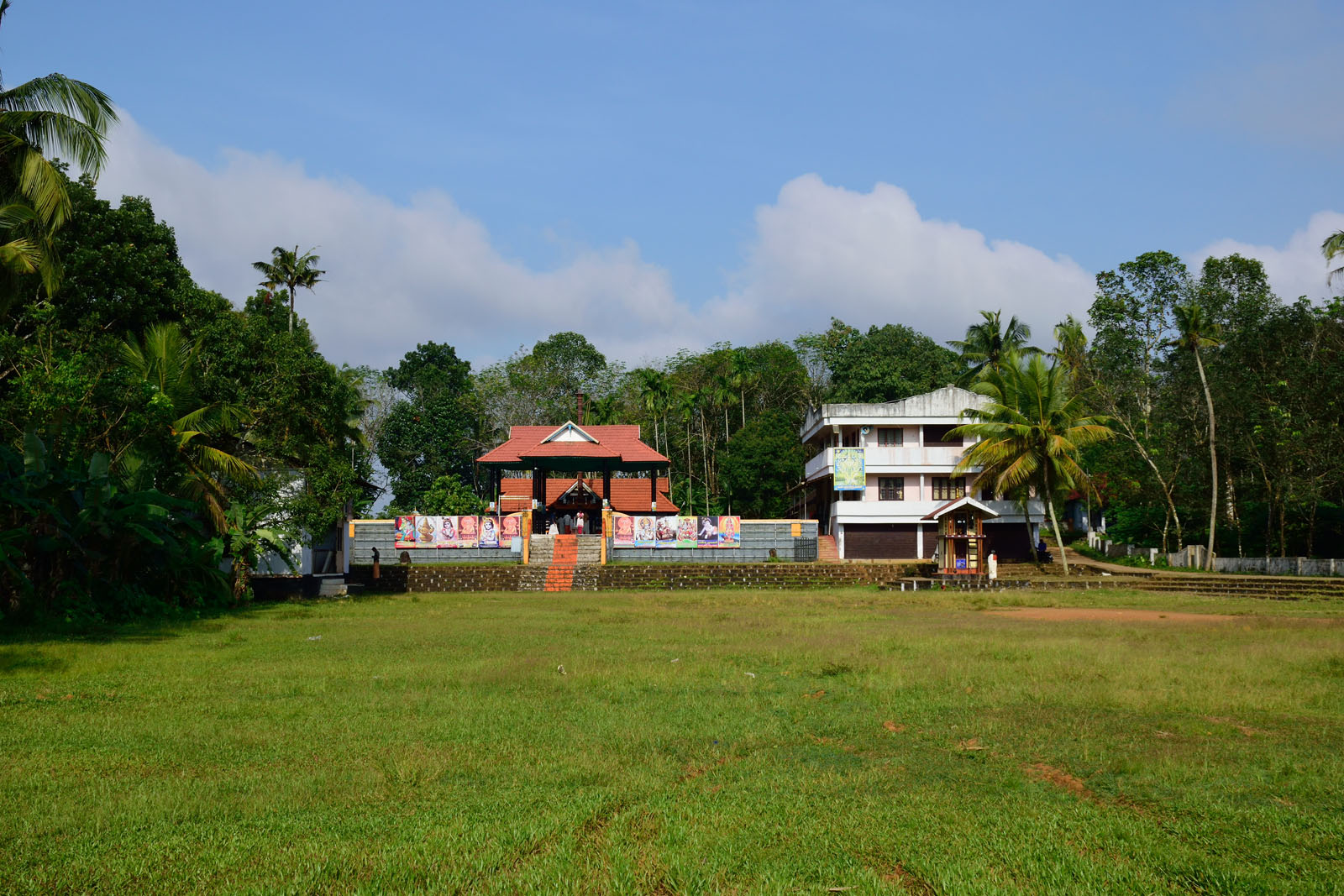
- Temple from its ground, where Gajamela is conducted

- Location within Kerala

Religion
- Affiliation: Hinduism
- District: Kottayam District
- Deity: Sree Dharma Sasthavu
- Festival: Gajamela

Location
- Location: Elamgulam
- State: Kerala
- Country: India
- Interactive map of Elamgulam Sree Dharma Sastha Temple
- Coordinates: 09°35′39.2″N 76°43′48.3″E

Architecture
- Type: Architecture of Kerala

Elamgulam Sree Dharma Sastha Temple is a Hindu temple in India, located in the state of Kerala. It is situated on Main Eastern Highway (SH-8) with its landmark temple ground in the village of Elamgulam in Kottayam district. The temple's annual festival features the captivating Gajamela (Elephant congregation) and Aanayoottu (Elephant feeding) ceremonies with around 15 elephants.

== History ==
The worship of Sastha forms part of the ancient history of South India.The deity here is believed to be 800 years old. The written history is available since the temple management came under the Edapally royal family. Post-monarchy, the temple was managed by local landlords and Nair Service Society (NSS) Karayogam until 1978 when it was transferred to a broad committee with members from various Hindu sects.

In 2018, as part of a major renovation, the Chuttambalam, the outer structure surrounding the sanctum sanctorum(Garbhagriha) within the temple walls, was removed. After 5 years, in January 2023 the new temple entirely made of stone, wood and copper was inaugurated with Brahmakalashabhisheka. Built to sustain for ages, the temple in its new avatar itself is a milestone in the history of the village.

== Architecture ==
Until 2018, the temple structure was made of bricked walls and clay tile roofs supported on wooden battens. During the major renovation, the walls of Chuttambalam and sub-deities were completely made of Krishnashila(Black natural stone). The roofs are covered with copper sheets and the Balikkalpura's ceiling has carvings on wood and the entablature has layers and the corners have dragon shapes spectacularly painted.

The Aanakkottil(a structure found in the courtyards of temples across Kerala) has 10 pillars with each pillar having a projected standalone Dashavatara(the 10 incarnations of lord Vishnu) sculpture beautifully mural painted. The temple compound walls are built in Aanappalla style(the vertical cross-section of the wall resembles an elephant viewed from its back) which is an ancient style found in temples.

== Gajamela ==
On the last day of the temple festival, Gajamela is usually conducted in the East Panthal(pavilion) of the temple followed by the famous Aanayoottu. Elephants are given rice balls mixed with fruits and nuts.

== See also ==
Elamgulam

Temples of Kerala
