= Kollakadavu =

- village
- Interactive map of Kollakadavu
- Coordinates: 9°15′17″N 76°35′18″E
- Country: India
- State: Kerala
- District: Alappuzha

Government
  - Body: Cheriyanad Panchayat

Population
  - Total: 257,519

Languages
  - Official: Malayalam, English
- Time zone: UTC+5:30 (IST)
- PIN: 690509
- Telephone code: 0479
- Vehicle registration: KL-4/KL-30
- Coastline: 0 kilometres (0 mi)
- Nearest city: Alleppey, Kottayam and Pattanamtitta
- Lok Sabha constituency: Mavelikara
- Chengannur: Cheriyanad Panchayat
- Climate: Tropical monsoon (Köppen)
- Avg. summer temperature: 35 °C (95 °F)
- Avg. winter temperature: 20 °C (68 °F)

Kollakadavu is a village near Cheriyanadu, Chengannur taluk, in Alappuzha district, in the state of Kerala, south-west India. The Achankoil River flows through the town.
