= Nellimukal =

Village in Pathanamthitta District, Kerala, India

Nellimukal is a small village located in Kerala, India. This village is part of Adoor Thaluk and comes under Pathanamthitta district. Its nearest town is Adoor which is about 5 km away.

The village is home to St. Gregorios Orthodox Chapel part of the Adoor-Kadampanad Diocese of the Malankara Orthodox Syrian Church.

== Etymology ==
The word nelli in Malayalam is a vernacular name for "Phyllanthus emblica". The name Nellimukal comes from nelli, because this area used to have a large number of Phyllanthus emblica trees before they were replaced by rubber plantations. Really the name of this place was "Puliyanaththara" because there were tigers in this place[not exist now].

== Geography ==
This village has beautiful farmlands. The plants and trees grown in farms are rubber, coconut, banana, tapioca, Amorphophallus paeoniifolius, etc. A state highway connecting Adoor to Chavara passes through the village. This village is partially hilly and had quarries, which is now ceased. Pallickal river flows through this village.

== Education ==
Govt.LPS Nellimukal is the main educational institution in this village.
