= Edakkunnam =

Edakkunnam (ഇടക്കുന്നം)
- village
- Location in Kerala, India Edakkunnam (ഇടക്കുന്നം) (India)
- Coordinates: 9°32′0″N 76°50′0″E
- Country: India
- State: Kerala
- District: Kottayam

Population (2011)
  - Total: 21,138

Languages
  - Official: Malayalam, English
- Time zone: UTC+5:30 (IST)
- Vehicle registration: KL-34

Edakkunnam is a village in Kanjirappally Taluk of Kottayam district in the state of Kerala, India. The nearest town is Kanjirappally.

== Demographics ==
As of 2011 India census, 21138 People are living in this village, 10543 are males and 10595 are females. Expected Edakkunnam population in 2021/2022 is between 20,715 and 23,675. Literate people are 18541 out of 9272 are male and 9269 are female. People living in Edakkunnam depend on multiple skills, total workers are 7458 out of which men are 5808 and women are 1650. Total 572 Cultivators are depended on agriculture farming out of 518 are cultivated by men and 54 are women. 567 people works in agricultural land as a labour in Edakkunnam, men are 479 and 88 are women.
