= Mukkoottuthara =

Town in Kerala, India

- Town/village
- Location in Kerala, India
- Coordinates: 9°26′49.43″N 76°52′40.41″E
- Country: India
- State: Kerala
- District: Kottayam

Government
  - Type: Panchayath
  - Body: Erumely grama panchayath
- Elevation: 117 m (384 ft)

Languages
  - Official: Malayalam, English
- Time zone: UTC+5:30 (IST)
- PIN: 686510
- Area code: 04828
- Vehicle registration: KL-34, KL-62
- Coastline: 0 kilometres (0 mi)
- Nearest city: Erumely
- Lok Sabha constituency: Pathanamthitta
- Legislative Assembly constituency: Ranni, Poonjar
- Climate: Tropical monsoon (Köppen)
- Avg. summer temperature: 30.63 °C (87.13 °F)
- Avg. winter temperature: 23.11 °C (73.60 °F)

Mukkoottuthara is a developing town located in the south eastern part of Kottayam district of Kerala State, India. Sabarimala is only 48 km (30 mi) from Erumely while travelling through Mukkoottuthara. The roads passing through here are upgraded and maintained as state highways. The main cultivation is rubber. Mukkoottuthara is famous for its decades old "Sunday Open Markets" and for its famous bamboo products (Muram, Kutta, Parampu, etc.). A famous tourist spot in Pathanamthitta, Perunthenaruvi Falls (the waterfall in Pampa River, where the entire river falls to about 20 feet) is just 5 kilometers from Mukkoottuthara. While the border of Kottayam and Pathanamthitta divides Mukkoottuthara in two, the town is recorded as part of Kottayam district only.

== Location ==
Mukkoottuthara is located in a hilly area in the south eastern part of Kottayam district near the border of Pathanamthitta district. It is 7 km away from Erumely and 8 km from Kanamala. During Sabarimala pilgrimage, the town is often crowded by pilgrims. Mukkoottuthara is a main junction on Erumely - Chalakkayam state highway.

== Climate ==
As in many parts of Kerala, Mukkoottuthara also experiences a tropical climate. Rainfalls with thunderstorms are common in the months of June, July and August. The annual rainfall averages about 2550 mm. March, April and May are the hottest months with a less amount of rainfall. The average annual temperature is 26.8 °C. Winter normally starts from December.

Climate data for Mukkoottuthara, Kerala
| Month | Jan | Feb | Mar | Apr | May | Jun | Jul | Aug | Sep | Oct | Nov | Dec | Year |
|---|---|---|---|---|---|---|---|---|---|---|---|---|---|
| Mean daily maximum °C (°F) | 30.5 (86.9) | 31.3 (88.3) | 32.6 (90.7) | 32.7 (90.9) | 32.2 (90.0) | 30.1 (86.2) | 29.4 (84.9) | 29.6 (85.3) | 30.1 (86.2) | 29.8 (85.6) | 29.5 (85.1) | 29.8 (85.6) | 30.6 (87.1) |
| Mean daily minimum °C (°F) | 21.5 (70.7) | 22.2 (72.0) | 23.7 (74.7) | 24.6 (76.3) | 24.7 (76.5) | 23.6 (74.5) | 23.1 (73.6) | 23.2 (73.8) | 23.2 (73.8) | 23.1 (73.6) | 22.7 (72.9) | 21.7 (71.1) | 23.1 (73.6) |
| Average precipitation mm (inches) | 23 (0.9) | 39 (1.5) | 69 (2.7) | 156 (6.1) | 243 (9.6) | 435 (17.1) | 455 (17.9) | 312 (12.3) | 230 (9.1) | 314 (12.4) | 211 (8.3) | 63 (2.5) | 2,550 (100.4) |
Source: Climate-Data.org

== Nearby schools and Colleges ==
- Little Flower Public School & Junior College, Kollamula
- S.N.D.P H.S.S Venkurinji
- Govt. L.P School, Kollamula
- St.Mary's Convent School, Elivalykara
- M.E.S College, Mukkoottuthara
- Nalanda College, Mukkoottuthara
- St.Antony's College, Mukkoottuthara

== Hospitals ==
- Assisi Hospital
- Cherupushpam Hospital
- Marymatha Dental Clinic
- Puttumannil Dental Clinic

== Banks and Financial Institutions ==
- Catholic Syrian Bank
- State Bank of Travancore
- Central Bank of India
- Sahyadri Co-Operative Credit Society
- Meenachil Co-Operative Bank
- Venkurinji Co-Operative Bank
- Kanamala Service Co-Operative Bank
- Mothoot Finance
- Muthoot Pappachan Finance
- Mulamoottil Finance
- Kosamattam Finance

== Churches ==
- Immanuel MarThoma Church, Thalayinathadom, Edakadathy
- India Pentecostal Church of God.
- St. Thomas Syro Malabar Catholic Church
- St.Mary's Malankara Catholic Church (Town Church)
- St.Maria Gorethi Syro Malabar Catholic Church, Kollamula
- St. Ignathios Jacobite Church, Propose
- Ascension Mar Thoma Church Mukkoottuthara
- Mukkoottuthara Sharon Fellowship Church
- Christian brethren church
- St.Antony's Church Elivalikara
- st. Ignatious jacobite Syrian church mukkoottuthara (town kurishupalli )

== Nearby Temples ==
- Thiruvambadi Sree Krishnaswami Temple
- Edakadathy Sree Dharma Sastha temple
- Edathikkavu Bhadrakali temple, Chathanthara
- Sree Bhadhrakali Temple Muttappally
