= Erumely =

- Town
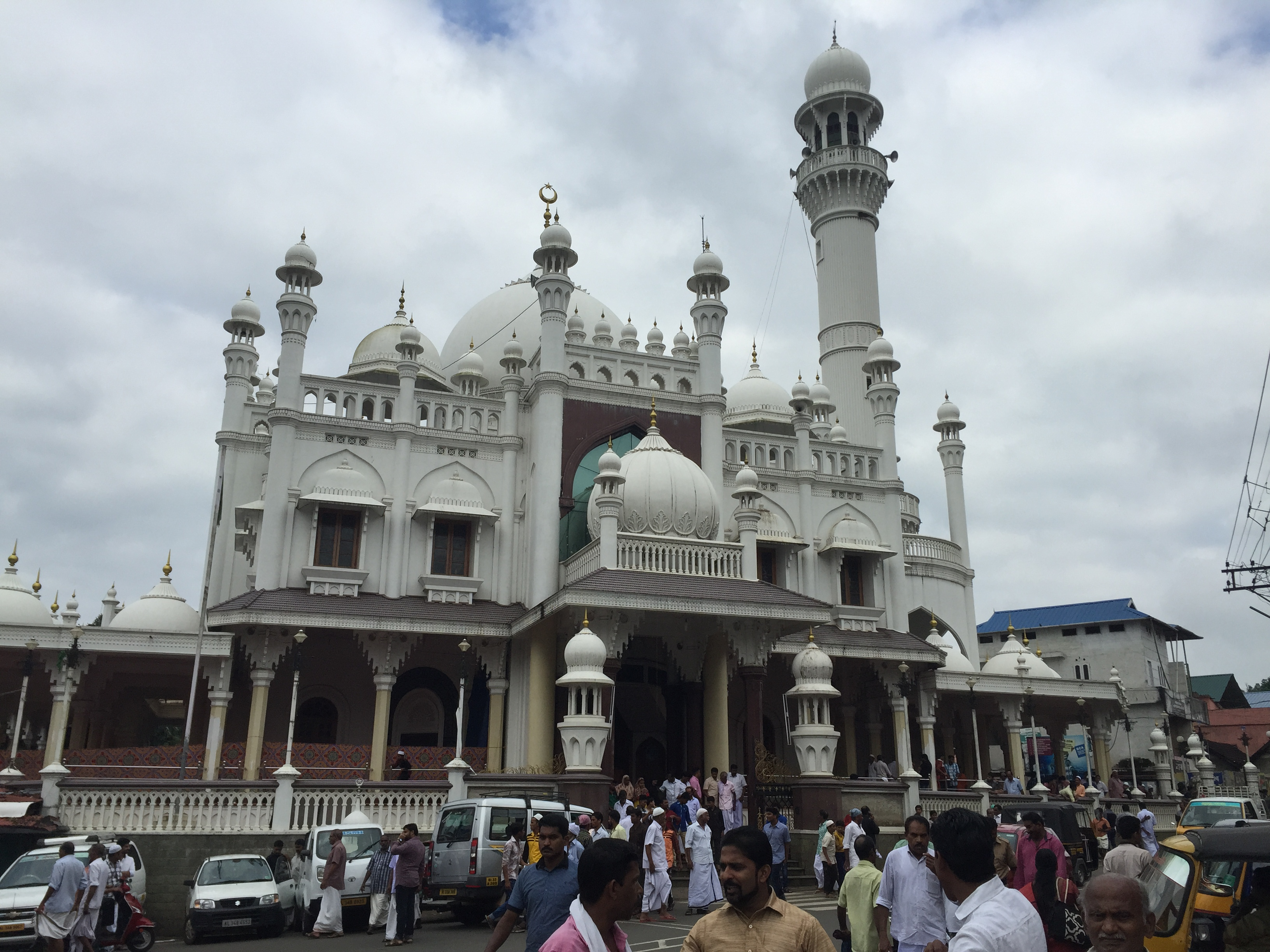
- From top to bottom: Entrance arch of Petta Sree Dharmasastha Temple, Vavar Juma Masjid
- Nicknames: Gateway to Sabarimala, Land of religious harmony, Erumakolli
- Location in Kerala, India Erumely (India)
- Coordinates: 9.4710933°N 76.7650384°E
- Country: India
- State: Kerala
- District: Kottayam

Government
  - Type: Grama Panchayat
  - Body: Erumely grama panchayat

Area
  - Total: 92.67 km^{2} (35.78 sq mi)
- Elevation: 68 m (223 ft)

Population (2011)
  - Total: 43,273
  - Density: 467.0/km^{2} (1,209/sq mi)

Languages
  - Official: Malayalam
- Time zone: UTC+5:30 (IST)
- PIN: 686509
- Telephone code: 04828
- Vehicle registration: (extended list)
- Nearest cities: Kanjirappally
- Lok Sabha constituency: Pathanamthitta
- Literacy: 94%
- Sex ratio: 1049♂/♀

Erumely, also spelled Erumeli, is a town and panchayat located in the south-eastern part of Kottayam district in Kerala, India. Erumely is situated 49 km (30 mi) east of Kottayam town and 133 km (83 mi) north of the state capital Thiruvananthapuram. The village is on the banks of the Manimala River.

== Demographics ==
As of 2011 Indian census, Erumely had a population of 43,437, of whom 21,199 were males and 22,230 were females. The male to female ratio is 1,049 females per 1,000 males, which is lower than the state average of 1,084. The literacy rate for males is 97.53%, while for females, it is 95.71%.

== Administration ==
The panchayath of Erumely was formed on 15 August 1953. It covers an area of 82.36 km^{2} with 40% forest cover. It is surrounded by Parathodu, Kanjirappally and Mundakkayam panchayaths in the north, Chittar Panchayath in the east and south, Manimala, and Chirakkadavu Panchayaths in west. The Panchayath is divided into 23 wards for its administrative convenience.

=== Wards in Erumely panchayath ===
Pazhayidom	Chenappady
Kizhakkekkara	Cheruvally estate
Ozhakkanadu	Vazhakkala
Nerchappara	Karisseri
Kanamala	Umikkuppa
Mukkoottuthara	Muttappally
Elivalikkara	Propose
Pambavalley	Erumely town
Poriyan mala	Kanakappalam
Sreenipuram	Vazhakkala
Irumpoonnikkara	Thumarampara

== Climate ==
The climate of Erumely is classified under Köppen. The place remains humid throughout the year with an annual temperature of 31 °C. March and April are the hottest months. The southwest monsoon arrives from mid May to August, providing a significant amount of rainfall. The average annual rainfall is 2620 mm. Winter normally starts from December to February.

Climate data for Erumely, Kerala
Month	Jan	Feb	Mar	Apr	May	Jun	Jul	Aug	Sep	Oct	Nov	Dec	Year
Mean daily maximum °C (°F)	31.1 (88.0)	31.9 (89.4)	33.2 (91.8)	33.3 (91.9)	32.7 (90.9)	30.6 (87.1)	30.0 (86.0)	30.0 (86.0)	30.6 (87.1)	30.3 (86.5)	30.1 (86.2)	30.5 (86.9)	31.2 (88.2)
Mean daily minimum °C (°F)	22.1 (71.8)	22.8 (73.0)	24.4 (75.9)	25.2 (77.4)	25.2 (77.4)	24.1 (75.4)	23.6 (74.5)	23.7 (74.7)	23.8 (74.8)	23.6 (74.5)	23.3 (73.9)	22.3 (72.1)	23.7 (74.6)
Average precipitation mm (inches)	22 (0.9)	39 (1.5)	68 (2.7)	157 (6.2)	254 (10.0)	454 (17.9)	466 (18.3)	328 (12.9)	240 (9.4)	320 (12.6)	211 (8.3)	61 (2.4)	2,620 (103.1)
Source: Climate-Data.org

== Access ==
=== Road ===
Erumely can be approached through Mundakkayam, Kanjirappally, Manimala, Kanamala, Ponkunnam, Vechoochira, or Ranni. People coming from Kottayam can reach through Kanjirappally. People coming from Kochi can reach through Thripunithura, Pala, Ponkunnam, Vizhikkithodu. People from the Highranges can access Erumely through Mundakkayam - Erumely state highway. From the capital city Trivandrum, Erumely is accessed through Ranni. NH220 National Highway passes 10 km near to Erumely through 26th mile, which makes it reachable easily. People coming from Alapuzha can reach Erumely through Changanacherry, Karukachal, and Manimala.

=== Railway ===
The nearest Rail Heads are Kottayam, Chengannur, Changanassery, and Thiruvalla.

=== Airport ===
Cochin International Airport (119 km) and Thiruvananthapuram Airport (140 km) are the nearest airports. Believers Church informed Chief Minister Pinarayi Vijayan that they were willing to hand over land for the construction of the Sabarimala International airport. The airport at Cheruvally is approved by both governments and may expect to start soon.

On 19 July 2017, the Kerala Government announced the construction of Airport at Cheruvally Estate of Harrisons Plantations near Erumeli, to facilitate travel for Sabarimala pilgrims.

State and central governments have approved an airport for Sabarimala and Cheruvally estate near Erumely is one of three sites. The other sites were government sites and whether Cheruvally is government land or not will be announced by court. The case is still pending in court. As of 2026, the airport has not yet been built because the issue of land use is still not resolved. If implemented, it will be a green field airport with no industries or commercial building allowed with a huge radius of 50 km or more.

The name of the proposed airport is Sabarimala International Airport or shortened as "SABARI AIRPORT". Distances from various places:

- From Kottayam: 50 km
- From Cochin : 98 km
- From Kumily: 70 km
- From Kanjirappally : 14 km
- From Pala : 40 km
- From Mundakkayam : 13.5 km
- From Ranni : 18 km
- From Angamoozhy : 28 km
- From Alappuzha: 73 km
- From Manimala: 17 km
- From Thodupuzha: 63 km
- From Changanacherry:44 km

== Nearby places ==
- Mundakayam
- Ranni
- Thulappally
- Kanjirappally
- Kuruvamoozhy
- Chenappady
- Mukkoottuthara
- Ponkunnam
- Kanamala

== See also ==
- Pettathullal
