= Sabarimala Greenfield Airport =

Proposed airport in Kerala

- IATA: none; ICAO: none

Summary
- Airport type: Public
- Serves: Kottayam and Pathanamthitta districts
- Location: Manimala–Erumely, Kottayam district, Kerala, India
- Coordinates: 9.464083°N 76.805579°E

Map
- Location of airport in Kerala Sabarimala International Airport (India)

Runways
| Direction | Length | | Surface |
| Direction | m | ft | Surface |
|---|---|---|---|
| 08/26 | 3,500 | 11,482 |

Sabarimala Greenfield Airport is a proposed greenfield airport in Kottayam district, Kerala, India. It is planned to cater to the pilgrims traveling to the hill shrine at Sabarimala, and the people from the nearby localities in the Kottayam and Pathanamthitta districts. The airport will be spread over 870 acres (350 ha) of land spread across Erumely and Manimala.

== Background and planning ==
The Sabarimala temple is located in Pathanamthitta district of Kerala, and attracts nearly 50 million visitors annually. Presently, the only way to reach the hill shrine dedicated to Ayyappa is by road. In 2017, the Government of Kerala began exploring the option of constructing an airport in the region aimed at reducing the traffic congestion on the roads leading to the town during the pilgrimage season. In February 2017, the state government gave in-principle approval for the construction of the airport, and tasked the Kerala State Industrial Development Corporation (KSIDC) with conducting a feasibility study. The KSIDC awarded the tender for the feasibility study to the American consultancy firm Louis Berger for ₹46.7 million (US$480,000).

In August 2017, the state government formed a three-member committee to identify the location for the airport in the 2,268 acres (918 ha) Cheruvally estate in Kanjirappally taluk. The Cheruvally Estate is a rubber plantation, which was initially owned by Harrison Plantation and later by RPG Group. It was acquired by Believer's Church in 2005. The state government claimed ownership of the land, and the ownership was disputed in a case before the High Court of Kerala. In April 2018, the court affirmed the church's ownership of the estate.

Although Louis Berger completed the feasibility report by December 2018, it did not conduct an environment impact assessment as the state government had not taken a final decision on the land acquisition for the project. In 2019, the state government constituted a search committee to select a special officer for the project, who would be responsible for coordinating with Louis Berger for the environment impact report and for acquiring the necessary clearance from the civil aviation ministry of the Government of India. In December 2019, the state government appointed V. Thulasidas, then managing director of Kannur International Airport, as the special officer for the project. The state government later identified 870 acres (350 ha) of land spread across Manimala and Erumely to be used for the airport, and directed the consultants to prepare a detailed project report. In June 2020, the state government cleared the land acquisition for the project.

In April 2023, the project was approved by the civil aviation ministry. In February 2024, the state government informed the Kerala Legislative Assembly that the necessary approvals from the central government and defence has been obtained.

== Infrastructure ==
The airport will have a single 3,500 m (11,500 ft)-long runway designated as 08/26.

== See also ==
- Aranmula International Airport
- List of airports in Kerala
