= Anicad (Kottayam) =

Anickad Anickadu
- village
- Location in Kerala, India Anickad (India)
- Coordinates: 9.6002541°N 76.6845937°E
- Country: India
- State: Kerala
- District: Kottayam

Population (2011)
  - Total: 16,897

Languages
  - Official: Malayalam, English
- Time zone: UTC+5:30 (IST)
- PIN: 6XXXXX
- Vehicle registration: KL-34
- Nearest city: Kochi
- Literacy: 95.4%
- Lok Sabha constituency: Palai

Anickadu (a.k.a. Anicad or Anickad) is a village in Kottayam district in the state of Kerala, India.

== Demographics ==
As of 2011 India census, Anickad had a population of 16897 with 8359 males and 8538 females.
