= Manimala =

- Town
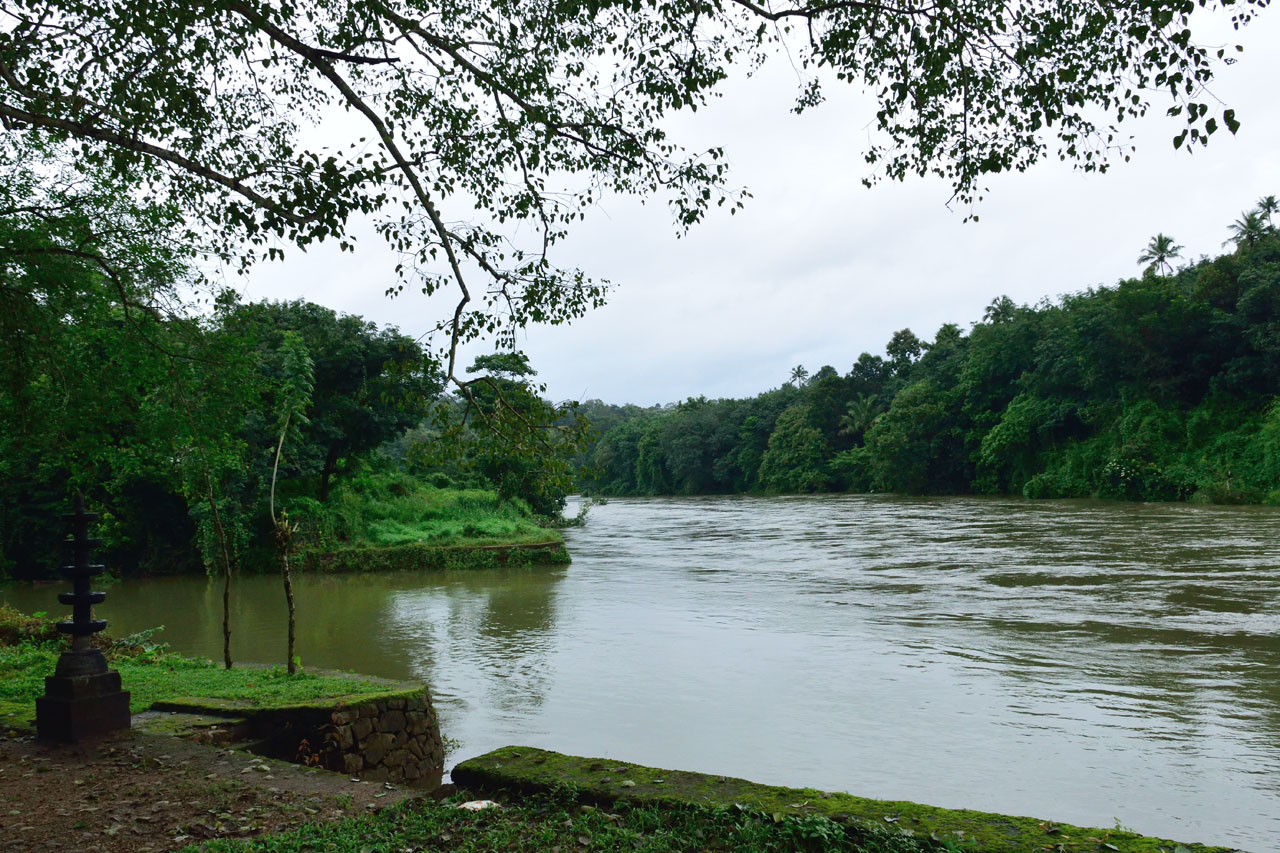
- Manimala River
- Interactive map of Manimala
- Coordinates: 9.483333°N 76.75°E
- Country: India
- State: Kerala
- District: Kottayam
- Named for: Manimala river

Government
  - Type: Panchayath
  - Body: Manimala grama panchayath

Area
  - Total: 37.53 km^{2} (14.49 sq mi)

Population (2001)
  - Total: 21,504
  - Rank: 25000
  - Density: 525/km^{2} (1,360/sq mi)

Languages
  - Official: Malayalam, English
- Time zone: UTC+5:30 (IST)
- PIN: 686543
- Telephone code: 04828
- Vehicle registration: KL-33 KL-34

== Geography ==
The River Manimala is 90 kilometres (56 mi) long. The area is mostly hilly with Kuranganmala, Varukunnu and Poovatholymala being the most important hills. Ponthenpuzha forest separates the village from Pathanamthitta district.

== Climate ==
Manimala experiences a tropical climate with sufficient rainfalls in the months of June, July, August and October. Average annual precipitation here is 2820 mm. Humidity rises during the months of March and April. Average annual temperature is 31.14°C. Temperature falls during the end of year. The place also receives locally developed thundershowers.

Climate data for Manimala, Kerala
Month	Jan	Feb	Mar	Apr	May	Jun	Jul	Aug	Sep	Oct	Nov	Dec	Year
Mean daily maximum °C (°F)	31.3 (88.3)	32.0 (89.6)	33.1 (91.6)	33.2 (91.8)	32.6 (90.7)	30.4 (86.7)	29.8 (85.6)	29.8 (85.6)	30.4 (86.7)	30.3 (86.5)	30.1 (86.2)	30.7 (87.3)	31.1 (88.1)
Mean daily minimum °C (°F)	22.2 (72.0)	23.1 (73.6)	24.5 (76.1)	25.4 (77.7)	25.4 (77.7)	24.1 (75.4)	23.6 (74.5)	23.7 (74.7)	23.8 (74.8)	23.8 (74.8)	23.4 (74.1)	22.4 (72.3)	23.8 (74.8)
Average precipitation mm (inches)	22 (0.9)	39 (1.5)	65 (2.6)	159 (6.3)	280 (11.0)	517 (20.4)	516 (20.3)	361 (14.2)	263 (10.4)	327 (12.9)	212 (8.3)	59 (2.3)	2,820 (111.1)
Source: Climate-Data.org

== Education ==
Manimala is renowned for its excellent literacy rate and convenient access to primary and secondary education facilities that are easily reachable on foot. There are four high schools located within a 2-kilometer radius of the town center, namely C.C.M Higher Secondary School in Karikkattoor, St. George Higher Secondary School in Manimala, Cardinal Padiyara Public School, and K.J.C.M.H.S Pulikkallu. These schools have recently undergone significant modernisation, including the incorporation of state-of-the-art amenities like IT and science labs. Additionally, schools like C.C.M Higher Secondary School in Karikkattoor, St. George Higher Secondary School, and Cardinal Padiyara School have benefited from the construction of modern school buildings and other facilities.

The village proudly boasts a 100% literacy rate, with girls generally outperforming boys in schools and universities.

The residents of Manimala, comprising various religious communities such as Syrian Christians, Hindus, and Muslims, coexist harmoniously and peacefully.

At the heart of the village, the magnificent Holy Magi's Forane church stands as a prominent landmark, with its towering church spire (known as "മണിമാളിക") visible from several kilometers away from the village center.(Ref JKM)

== Economy ==
Manimala was an important transaction hub for goods from the high range areas of Kerala. The boats from Alappuzha and Changanacherry market used to come to Manimala. The boats could not go up any longer because of the presence of rocks in the river. Thus Manimala naturally became the transaction hub for goods from the high range areas. Later, with large-scale sand and gravel mining in the river, the river became inaccessible for boats. This along with the development of road transports reduced the importance of Manimala. The village has many commercial banks such as Catholic Syrian Bank, Federal Bank Ltd, Co-Operative Bank, and government-owned State Bank of India. Access to modern health care is also possible through village-based primary health center and other seven modern hospitals within 16 kilometers. The River Manimala and the Manimala bridge are the two nostalgic symbols to the people of Manimala.

== Access ==
Manimala has access to all major cities and inter national airports in Kerala through roadways. The nearest railway stations are at Kottayam, (district headquarters) and Changanacherry. Manimala lies on the main eastern highway (SH-8) in between Ponkunnam and Ranni. Both privately operated and state owned buses provides services to Manimala from dawn to dusk.

Also the proposed Sabarigiri International Airport will be constructed by acquiring Cheruvally Estate which is nearly only five kilometers away from Manimala town centre (Ref : JKM).

== Demographics ==
As of 2011 India census, Manimala had a population of 21053 of which 10213 are males and 10840 are females. Majority are plantation owners whose main income comes from rubber plantations. The planters of Manimala are mostly Catholic Syrian Christians, who are the descendants of settler farmers who migrated to the region from Kuravilangad and Meenachil regions centuries ago.

== Places of worship ==
There are many places to worship in the village, one of which is the Manimalkkavu Bhagavathi Temple, which at one point owned a lot of land in the area, which included the villages of Manimala and Vellavoor.

- Manimalkkavu Bhagavathi Temple
- Kulathumkal Sreedevi Temple
- Kadayanickadu Bhagavathy Temple
- Kadayanickadu Dharmashastha Temple
- Koodathingal Mahadeva Temple
- Moongani Sree Dhrama Sastha temple
- Mooleplavu Sri Dharmashastha Temple
- Manimala Town Mosque
- Holy Magi Forane Church (Pazhaya Palli – Archdiocese of Changanacherry)
- St. Basil's Church (Puthan Palli – Archdiocese of Changanacherry)
- SH Church Karimpanakulam [Archdiocese of changanacherry]
- St. Mary’s church, Vallamchira (Archdiocese of Changanacherry)
- St. James' Church, Karikkattoor (CMI - Archdiocese of Changanassery)
- St. Mary's Church, Cheruvally (Archdiocese of Changanassery)
- St. Michael's Church, Pazhayidam (Archdiocese of Changanassery)
- St. Antoney's Church, Karikkattoor Centre (Archdiocese of Changanassery)
- St. Joseph's Church, Karikkattoor (Kottayam Diocese - Roman Catholic Latin Church)

The parish feast of the Holy Magi Forane Church in Manimala is observed in January and attracts a large number of devotees. Participants include people from different religious backgrounds.

== See also ==
- Kanjirappally
- Manimala river. Manimala includes Vellavoor panchayath and manimala panchayath.
