= Mundakayam =

Mundakayam Doorway to highrange
- Town
- Location in Kerala, India Mundakayam (India)
- Coordinates: 9°32′15″N 76°53′5″E
- Country: India
- State: Kerala
- District: Kottayam

Government
  - Body: Mundakayam Grama Panchayat

Area
  - Total: 54 km^{2} (21 sq mi)

Population (2011)
  - Total: 38,445
  - Density: 710/km^{2} (1,800/sq mi)

Languages
  - Official: Malayalam, English
- Time zone: UTC+5:30 (IST)
- PIN: 686513
- Telephone code: 04828
- Vehicle registration: KL-34
- Lok Sabha constituency: Pathanamthitta
- Civic agency: Gram Panchayat

Mundakayam, is a town in Kanjirappally Taluk in the Kottayam District of Kerala. It is the doorway to the high ranges of southern Kerala, and is at the border of Kottayam and Idukki districts. The next nearest town, Kanjirappally, is 14 km (8.7 mi) & Erumely is 12 km from Mundakayam. Mundakayam has rubber plantations, and greenery. The Manimala River runs through Mundakayam. It is located 48 km east of the district headquarters at Kottayam and 148 km from the state capital, Thiruvananthapuram. The name Mundakayam is said to be derived from the Mundi cranes that used to be seen along the Manimala River banks.

== Economy ==
Mundakayam is a land of coffee, pepper, cocoa and natural rubber. An All India Agricultural & Industrial Exhibition was held here in 1967 which was inaugurated by Hindi film maker Sunil Dutt.

== Administration ==
Mundakayam is part of Poonjar Constituency for Kerala Legislative Assembly Elections and part of Pathanamthitta (Lok Sabha constituency) for Indian General Elections. ADV.SEBASTIAN M.J (UDF) is the sitting MLA. Anto Antony of INC is the MP representing Mundakayam.

== Education ==
Local schools include St. Joseph's Central School and Junior College and John Joseph Murphy Memorial Higher Secondary School, Yendayar.

== Government Institutions ==
- Mundakayam Post Office
- Mundakayam Police Station
- FHC Mundakayam
- PWD Guest House
- BSNL Office
- Kerala Water Authority Office
- KSEB Office
- Village Office
- Krishi Bhavan
- Central Excise Office, Mundakayam
- Excise Range Office, Mundakayam
- Thiruvithamcoor Devaswam Board Commissioner Office, Mundakayam

== Notable temples ==
- Parthasarathy Temple, Mundakkayam
- Valliyamkavu Devi Temple, Paloorkkavu

== Climate ==
Climate data for Mundakayam
Month	Jan	Feb	Mar	Apr	May	Jun	Jul	Aug	Sep	Oct	Nov	Dec	Year
Mean daily maximum °C (°F)	32 (90)	32 (90)	33 (91)	33 (91)	32 (90)	30 (86)	29 (84)	29 (84)	30 (86)	30 (86)	30 (86)	31 (88)	31 (88)
Mean daily minimum °C (°F)	22 (72)	23 (73)	25 (77)	25 (77)	25 (77)	24 (75)	23 (73)	24 (75)	24 (75)	24 (75)	24 (75)	23 (73)	24 (75)
Average precipitation mm (inches)	22 (0.9)	39 (1.5)	60 (2.4)	155 (6.1)	320 (12.6)	636 (25.0)	596 (23.5)	397 (15.6)	292 (11.5)	326 (12.8)	210 (8.3)	52 (2.0)	3,105 (122.2)
Average precipitation days (≥ 0.1 mm)	1	2	3	7	10	21	20	17	13	12	8	3	117
Source: Weather2Travel

== Notable people ==
- Thilakan - Prominent Malayalam film actor - an Indian film and stage actor who has starred in over 200 Malayalam films
- Joseph Abraham - Athlete - won the 400m Hurdles Gold for India at 2010 Guangzhou Asian Games
- Seema G. Nair - supporting actresses in Malayalam cinema and serials

== Nearby places of interest ==
=== Nearest towns ===
- Kanjirapally 14 km
- Erumeli 12 km
- Erattupetta 26 km
- Pala 35 km
- Pathanamthitta 46 km
- Kottayam 54 km
- Thodupuzha 56 km
- Thiruvalla 60 km
- Changanacherry 58 km
- Kumily 55 km
- Kattappana 58 km
- Manimala 29 km

=== Nearby taluks ===
- Kanjirappally 14 km
- Azhutha 24 km
- Vazhoor 28 km
- Ranni 30 km

=== Nearest airports ===
- Cochin International Airport 105 km
- Trivandrum International Airport 155 km

=== Nearest railway stations ===
- Kottayam Railway Station 51 km
- Changanacherry railway station 53 km
- Tiruvalla railway station 56 km

== See also ==
- T. F. Bourdillon, British planter, botanist and forest conservator who visited Mundakkayam in late 19th century
- Kottayam
- Kanjirappally
- Ponkunnam
- Kuttikkanam
- Koottikkal
- Yendayar
- Sabarigiri International Airport
- All India Consumer Price Index
- Kattappana
