= Ponkunnam =

- Town
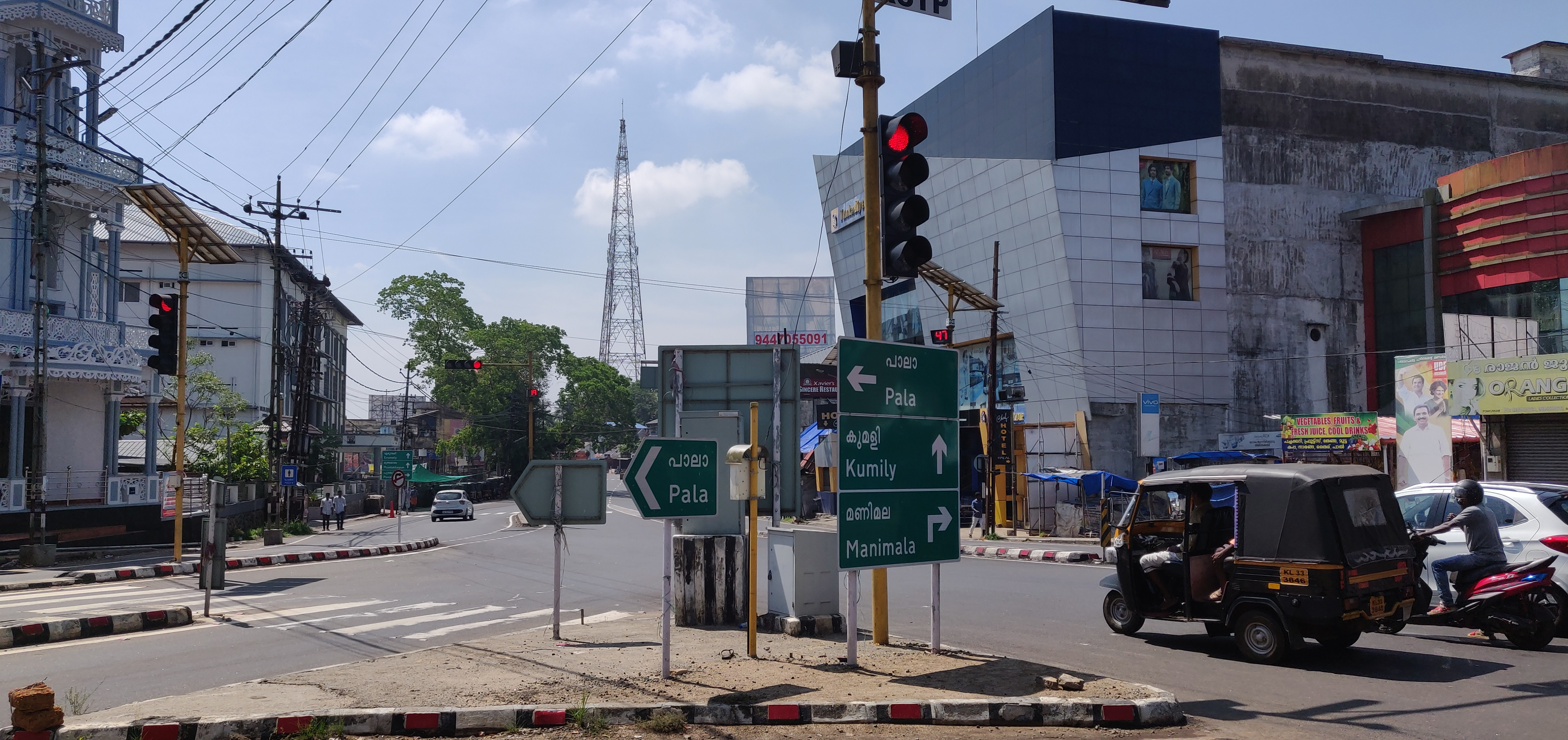
- Ponkunnam town

- Location in Kerala, India Ponkunnam (India)
- Coordinates: 9.56°N 76.75°E
- Country: India
- State: Kerala
- District: Kottayam

Government
  - Body: Chirakadavu Panchayat

Population (2011)
  - Total: 26,121

Languages
  - Official: Malayalam, English
- Time zone: UTC+5:30 (IST)
- PIN: 686506
- Telephone code: 04828
- Vehicle registration: KL-34
- Nearest city: Kottayam, Kanjirappally.
- Literacy: 99.8%
- Website: www.ponkunnamtown.in

Ponkunnam is a town in Kerala, India, part of Kottayam district under Kanjirappally taluk. Nearby towns are Kanjirappalli, Pampady, Manimala and Pala. Ponkunnam literally means golden mountain (ponn = gold, kunn = mountain).

Ponkunnam is one of the busiest towns along the NH 220 comprising key administrative institutions of Kanjirappally taluk such as the Kanjirapally Munsif Court, DySP office, and Regional Transport Office. It is a part of Kanjirappally State Legislative constituency and Pathanamthitta Lok Sabha constituency. The town is also home to many educational institutions and healthcare facilities. Part of the Syrian Christian belt, there are many Syrian Christian agrarian families that reside here.

== Geography ==
This part of Kerala is famous for its fertile land and rubber plantations. It is at an altitude of 495 ft (151 m) above mean sea level. The town is at the junction of two major roads in Kerala: NH 183 and Main Eastern Highway. The climate is moderate with timely cold breezes and the town is the gateway to the Western Ghats.

== Religious places ==
- Chirakkadavu Mahadeva Temple, is on the way to Manimala, nearly 3 km from Ponkunnam Town.
- Manakkattu Bhadra Temple, is on Ponkunnam - Mannamplavu Road, nearly 4 km from Ponkunnam Town.
- Holy Family Syro Malabar Church - near KSRTC bus station.

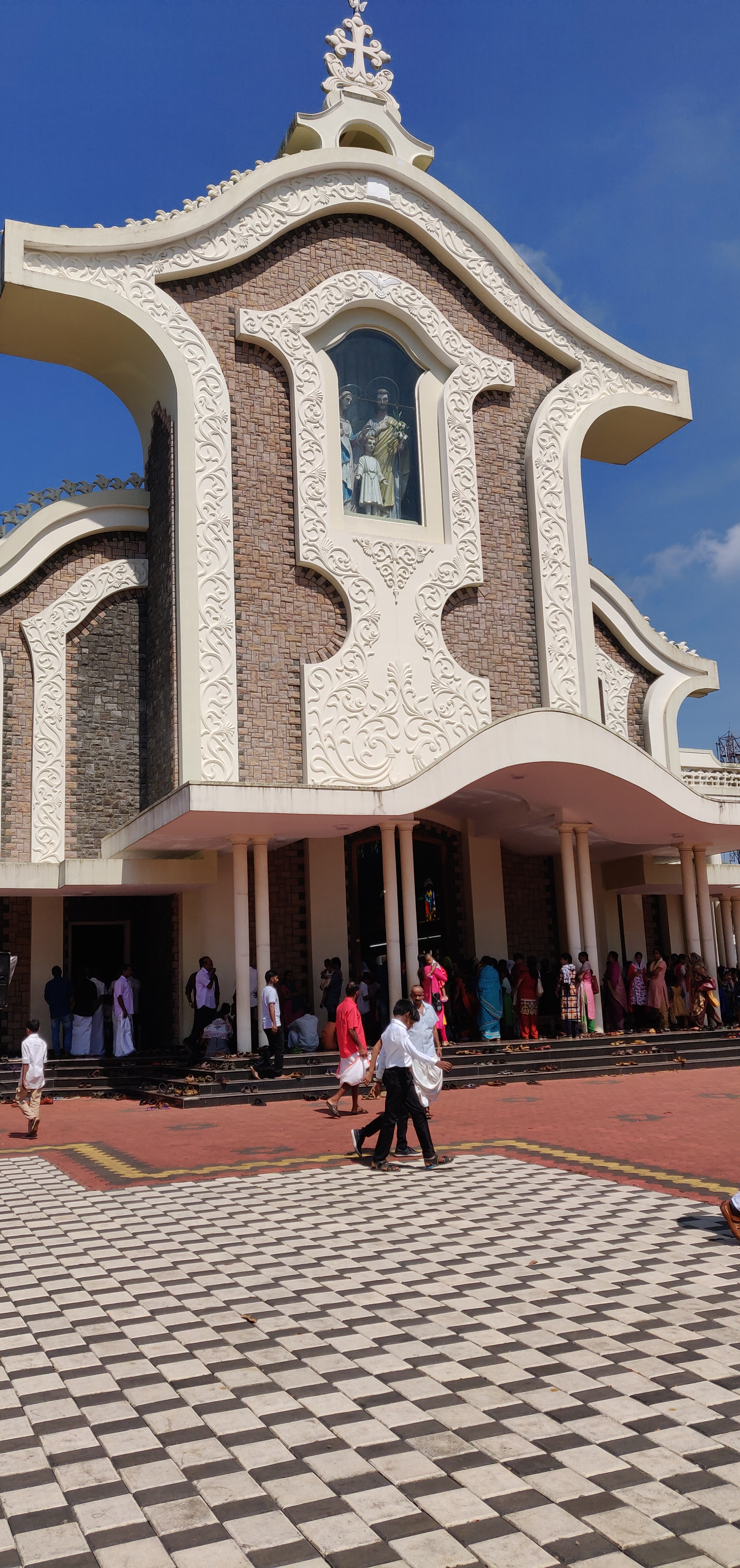
Façade of the Holy Family Syro-Malabar Catholic Church, Ponkunnam

- Ponkunnam Puthiyakavu Temple is near the Ponkunnam private bus stand.
- St.Marys Orthodox Church is on the Ponkunnam–Thampalakad road.

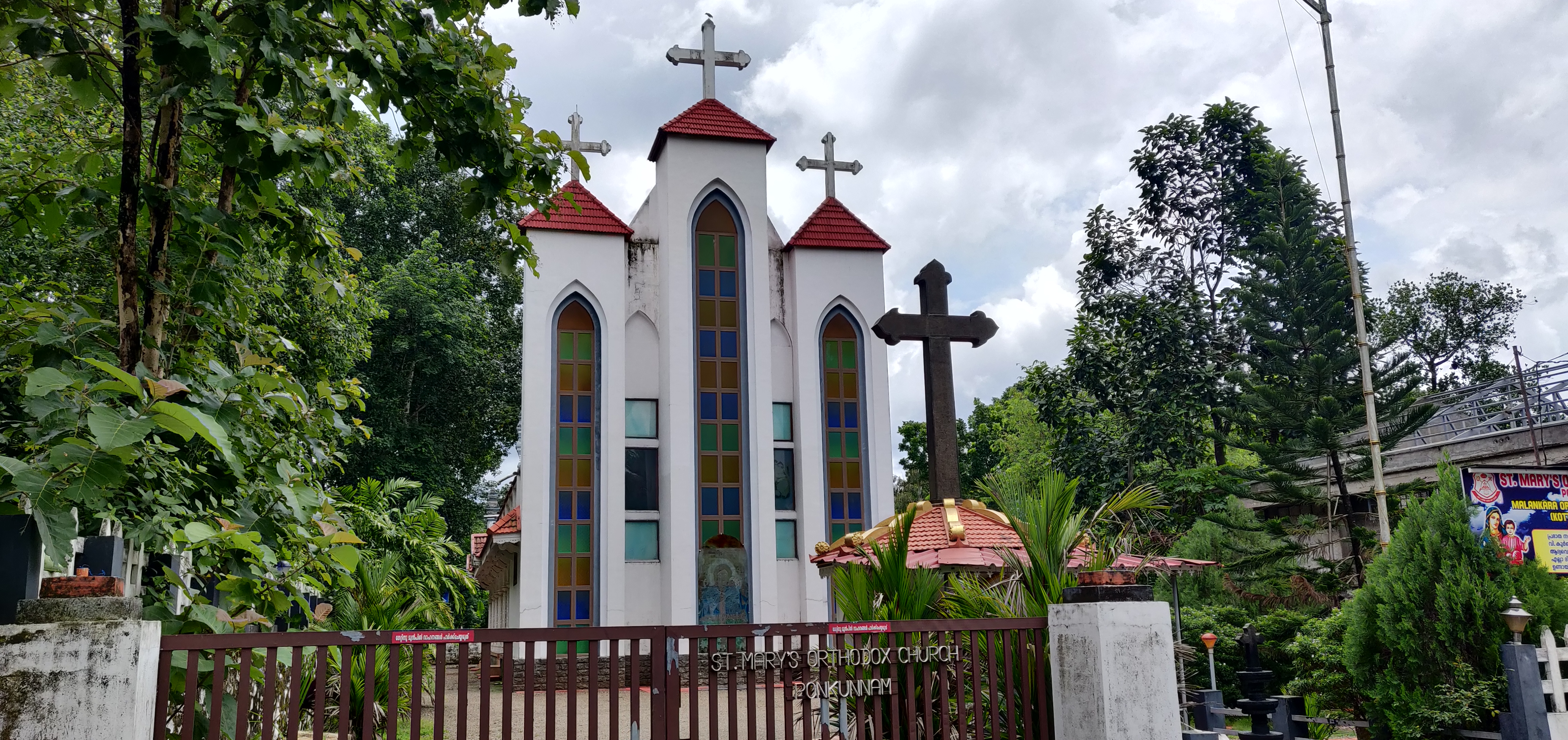
St.Marys Orthodox Church

- Mosque is near Ponkunnam bus stand & in Manimala road.
- Latin Catholic Church 2 km from the town (westward) by the side of NH 183.
- CMS church half km from the town at Attickal in PP Road.
- Elamgulam Sreedharma Shasta temple and Elagmulam church are 5 km away from the town.
- Panamttom Devi temple (Where the traditional travancore folklore padyani is held every year as a part of temple fest) is 4.5 km from Ponkunnam.

== Events and customs ==
The town is famous for its volleyball traditions and customs. Almost every year there is an ever-rolling volleyball tournament happening in Ponkunnam Mahatma Gandhi Mini Stadium.

== Notable persons ==
- Babu Antony, prominent South Indian film actor
- Bipin Chandran, noted film script-writer from Kerala.
- M. D. Rajendran, Film director
- Ponkunnam Damodaran, Poet from Kerala
- Ponkunnam Varkey, notable writer
- Thampi Antony, an actor and novelist from Kerala
- Ranjith Riji, A social media influencer and Actors

== Transport ==
=== Road ===
Ponkunnam lies on the National Highway 183 (Old NH 220) connecting the City of Kottayam and Theni. The NH183 connects Kottayam to the state of Tamil Nadu. It is one of the busiest roads passing through Ponkunnam.

The Main Eastern Highway (Punalur- Pathanamthitta- Ponkunnam- Pala- Muvattupuzha) also passes through Ponkunnam. Main Eastern Highway is categorized as State Highway - 08 ( SH-08 ) of Kerala. It is the second-longest State Highway of Kerala covering a distance of 153.6 km (95.4 mi). The districts it passes through are Kollam, Pathanamthitta, Kottayam, Idukki, and Ernakulam. These highways connect Ponkunnam to Muvattupuzha MC Road(SH-01). The Ponkunnam- Pala- Thodupuzha- Muvattupuzha stretch of Main Eastern Highway was upgraded in 2016 to a width of 15 meters (49 ft). The two-lane highway, which connects Ponkunnam To Muvattupuzha over 60 km (37 mi) within 80 minutes. This makes it easy to access for the people of Highranges, tourists to Thekkady and pilgrims of Sabarimala to reach Muvattupuzha, Angamaly and Ernakulam. The Highway becomes congested during the months of November and December due to Sabarimala pilgrims.

There is one KSRTC Bus stand and one private bus stand. Daily, there are many buses to Kottayam, Changanassery, Ernakulam, Thiruvananthapuram, Thrissur, Kozhikode, Bangalore and also to the nearest towns: Kanjirappally, Erumely etc. KSRTC operates a chain service to Pala. KSRTC also operates a chain service from Kottayam to Kumily via Ponkunnam.

=== Railway ===
The nearest railway stations are Kottayam (33 km) and Changanassery (38 km).

=== Air ===
The nearest airport is Cochin International Airport, Kochi (94 km).

== See also ==
- Main Eastern Highway
- Kanjirappally
- Mundakayam.
