= Kanjirappally =

- Town
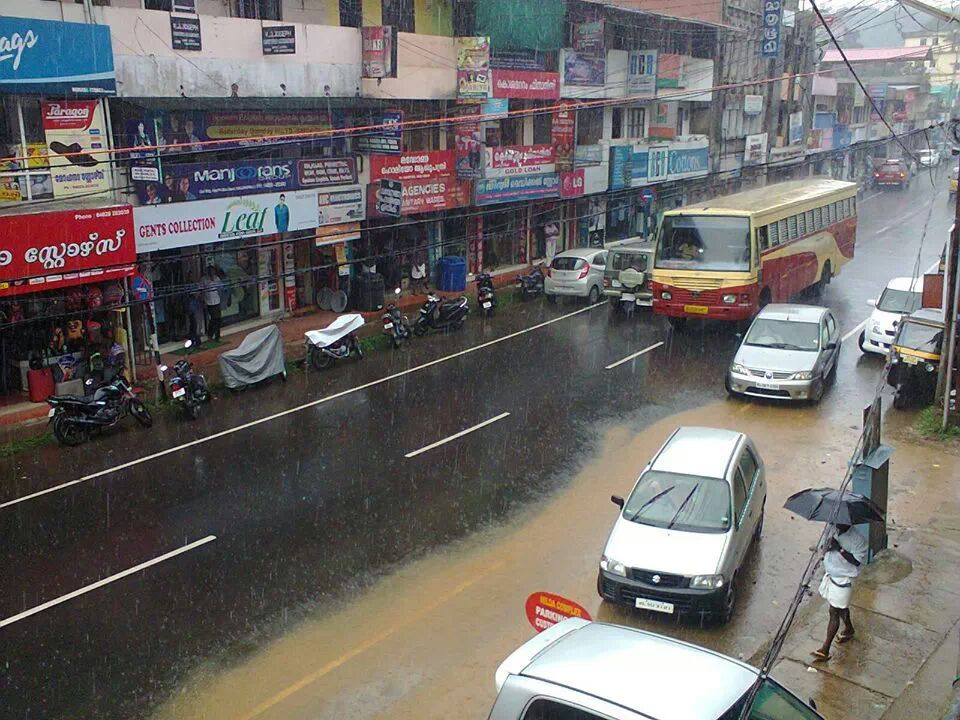
- A rainy morning in Kanjirappally town

- Location in Kerala, India Kanjirappally (India)
- Coordinates: 9.55819°N 76.78717°E
- Country: India
- State: Kerala
- District: Kottayam

Government
  - Type: Panchayat

Area
  - Total: 52.47 km^{2} (20.26 sq mi)

Population (2011)
  - Total: 43,057
  - Density: 820.6/km^{2} (2,125/sq mi)

Languages
  - Official: Malayalam, English
- Time zone: UTC+5:30 (IST)
- PIN: 686507
- Telephone code: 04828
- Vehicle registration: KL-34
- Climate: Tropical monsoon (Köppen)
- Nearest cities: Kottayam, Thodupuzha, Pala
- Lok Sabha constituency: Pathanamthitta
- Assembly constituency: Kanjirappally
- Avg. summer temperature: 31 °C (88 °F)
- Avg. winter temperature: 23 °C (73 °F)

Kanjirappally is a taluk and a major town in Kottayam district of the Indian state of Kerala. It is situated about 38 kilometres (24 mi) east of the district headquarters at Kottayam.

== Climate ==
Kanjirappally has one of the highest numbers of rainy days in Kerala. It receives abundant rainfall from the summer monsoon, winter rains, and northeast monsoon (Thulaam Mazha), resulting in a well-distributed pattern that supports high latex yields from rubber plantations in the region. The average annual rainfall is reported as 4,156 mm.

== Transportation ==
National Highway (old NH 220: Kollam - Theni now NH 183) connects Kanjirapally to major nearest cities.

The K. K. Road (NH 183: Kollam-Theni) (Kottayam-Kumily Road) connects Kanjirapally to nearby towns like Mundakkayam (16 km or 9.9 mi), Kottayam (38 km or 24 mi), Kuttikkanam (34 km or 21 mi), Kumily (72 km or 45 mi) and Kattappana (55 km or 34 mi).

- Pamba - Chemmalamattam - Erattupetta - Neriyamangalam (SH44) connects Kanjirapally to Sabarimala (65 km or 40 mi), Erumely (15 km or 9.3 mi), Pamba (60 km or 37 mi), Erattupetta (16 km or 9.9 mi) and Thodupuzha (46 km or 29 mi).
- Main Eastern Highway (Muvattupuzha-Thodupuzha-Pala-Manimala - Pathanamthitta-Punalur Road) connects Kanjirappally to other major towns.
- Kanjirappally-Manimala (12 km or 7.5 mi) road connects Changanassery easily. Chenappady (8 km or 5.0 mi) connects Ranni (26 km or 16 mi).
- A link road that connects Pala (26 km or 16 mi) directly from Kanjirappally through Thambalakkadu (3 km or 1.9 mi).
- Parathanam - Mundakayam - Parathode - Podimattam - 26th Mile - Kanjirappally (23 km or 14 mi)

The nearest international airport is Cochin International Airport in Nedumbassery, the nearest railway station is in Kottayam, Changanacherry and the nearest KSRTC bus station is in Ponkunnam.

On 19 July 2017, the Kerala Government has announced the construction of the 5th International Airport in Kerala, Sabarigiri International Airport at Cheruvally Estate of Harrisons Plantations at Manimala, Erumely, situated at the Border of Kottayam District and Pathanamthitta district to facilitate travel of Sabarimala pilgrims.

== Administration ==
Kanjirappally assembly constituency is part of Pathanamthitta (Lok Sabha constituency).

== Notable people ==
- Alphons Kannanthanam
- P. T. Chacko
- Rosemary, Malayalam language poet and translator.

== Education ==
Schools and colleges in Kanjirappally:

- St. Antony's Public School, Anakkal
- St. Joseph's HS , Mundakayam
- AKJM (Archbishop Kavukattu Jubilee Memorial) Higher Secondary School
- Alfeen Public School
- Amal Jyothi College of Engineering, Koovappally
- St. Dominic's College, Podimattom
- C K M H S S Koruthodu
- Achamma Memorial Higher Secondary School Kalaketty
- Palampadam LPS Chotty
- N.H.A.U.P School
- Myca English Medium School
- St Dominic's Higher Secondary School, Kanjirappally
- St. Mary's Girls Higher Secondary School, Kanjirappally
- Infant Jesus Public School, Kanjirappally
- St. Ephrem's LPS Chirackadavu
- Madonna ITC Anchilippa
- IHRD College of Applied Science Kanjirappally

== See also ==
- Kattappana
