= Panchalimedu =

- Hill station
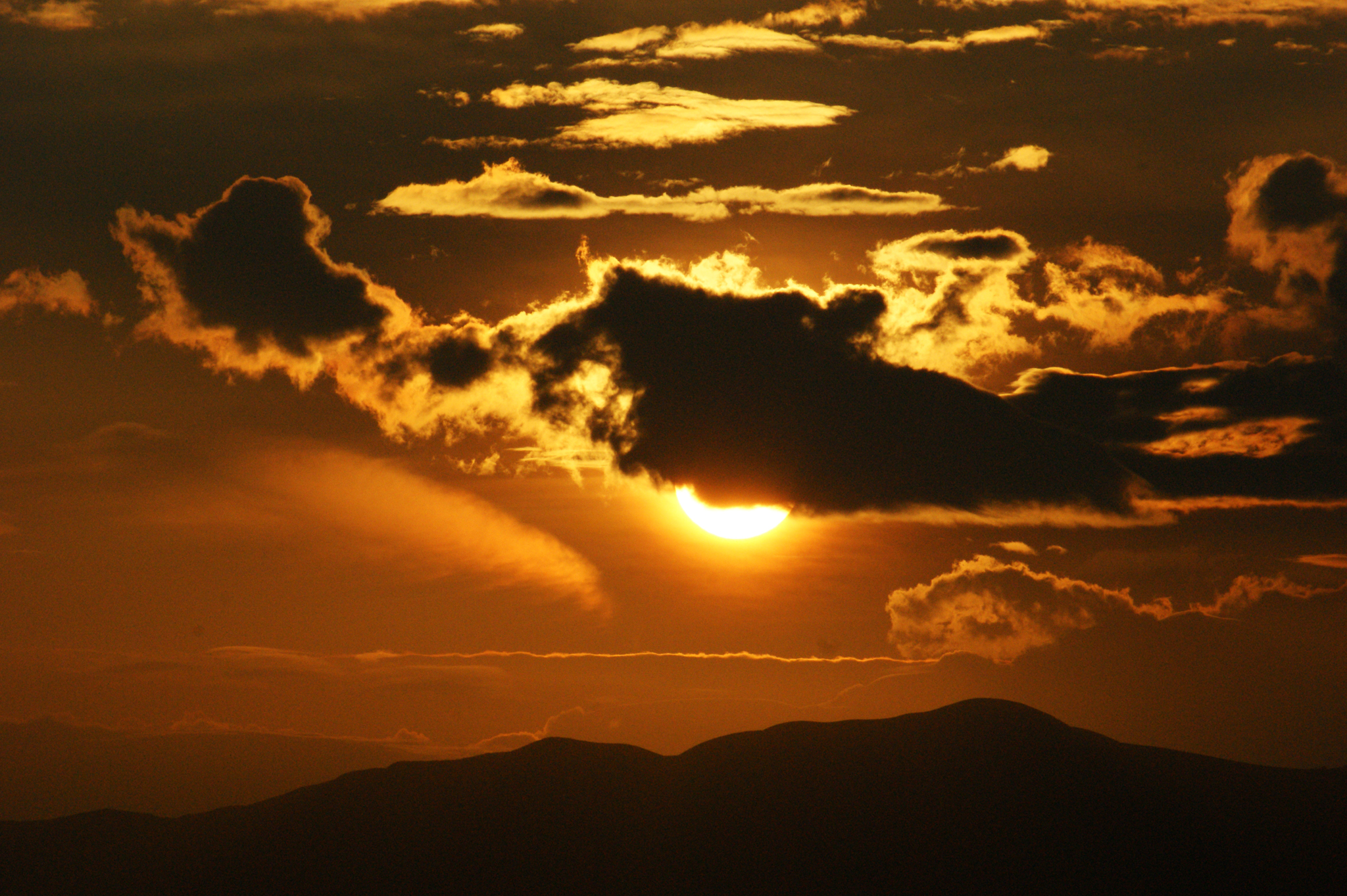
- Sunrise view from Panchalimedu
- Etymology: Derived from Panchali (Draupadi) and Medu (hill), literally means the 'Hill of Panchali'.
- Location in Kerala, India Panchalimedu (India)
- Coordinates: 9°34′15″N 77°00′52″E
- Country: India
- State: Kerala
- District: Idukki

Government
  - Type: Panchayath
  - Body: Peruvanthanam panchayath
- Elevation: 940 m (3,080 ft)

Languages
  - Official: Malayalam, English
- Time zone: UTC+5:30 (IST)
- PIN: 685532
- Area code: 04869
- Vehicle registration: KL-37
- Nearest cities: Peermade, Mundakkayam
- Website: http://panchalimedu.com

Panchalimedu is a hill station and view point near Kuttikkanam in Peerumedu tehsil of Idukki district in the Indian state of Kerala. On the Makar Sankranti day, many Ayyappa devotees camps there to witness the sacred Makaravilakku (holy flame) that appears in the Ponnambalamedu near Sabarimala temple.

Presently there is a Hindu temple and a Christian shrine at the two extreme hills.

== Topography ==
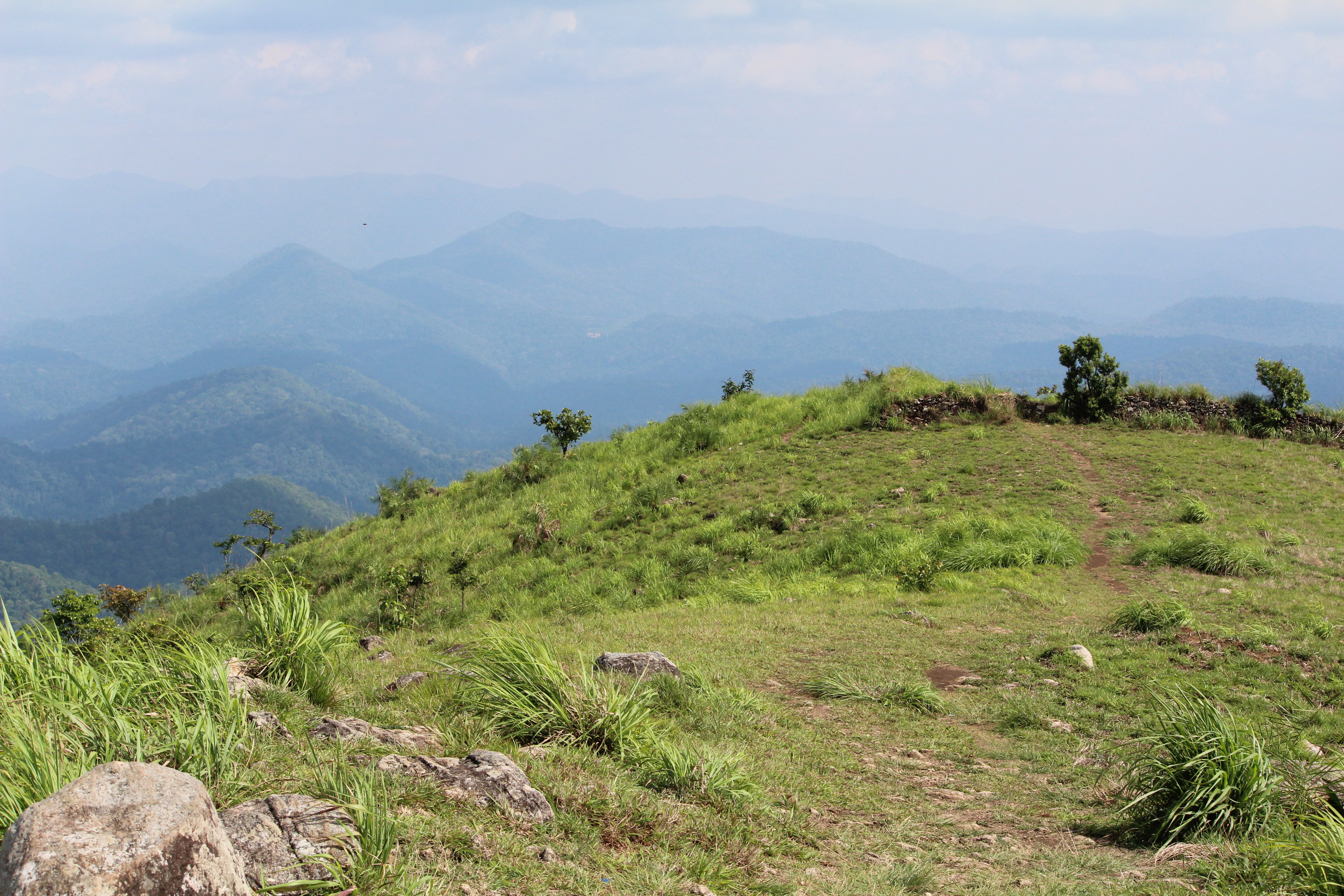
Distant hills as seen from Panchalimedu view point

Predominantly it is a high altitude region situated at a height of 3,080 ft (940 m) above the mean sea level. The place is surrounded by deep valleys and hills, accompanied by meadows, grasslands and cool refreshing climate. From there, the Koruthodu valley near Mundakkayam with widespread rubber plantations can be seen. Parunthumpara hills and Periyar tiger reserve lies to the east of Panchalimedu. Many tourists arrives there during the summer season for trekking and to get refreshed. When monsoon arrives, the place will be covered by charming mist and thick fog. Although, a pleasant climate is experienced here throughout the year. Apart from Pullumedu, Panchalimedu is another spot in the district where many pilgrims gather to witness the Makaravilakku, a holy flame that is believed to a supernatural phenomenon by the devotees, which appears annually on 14 January in the Ponnambalamedu summit.

== Location ==
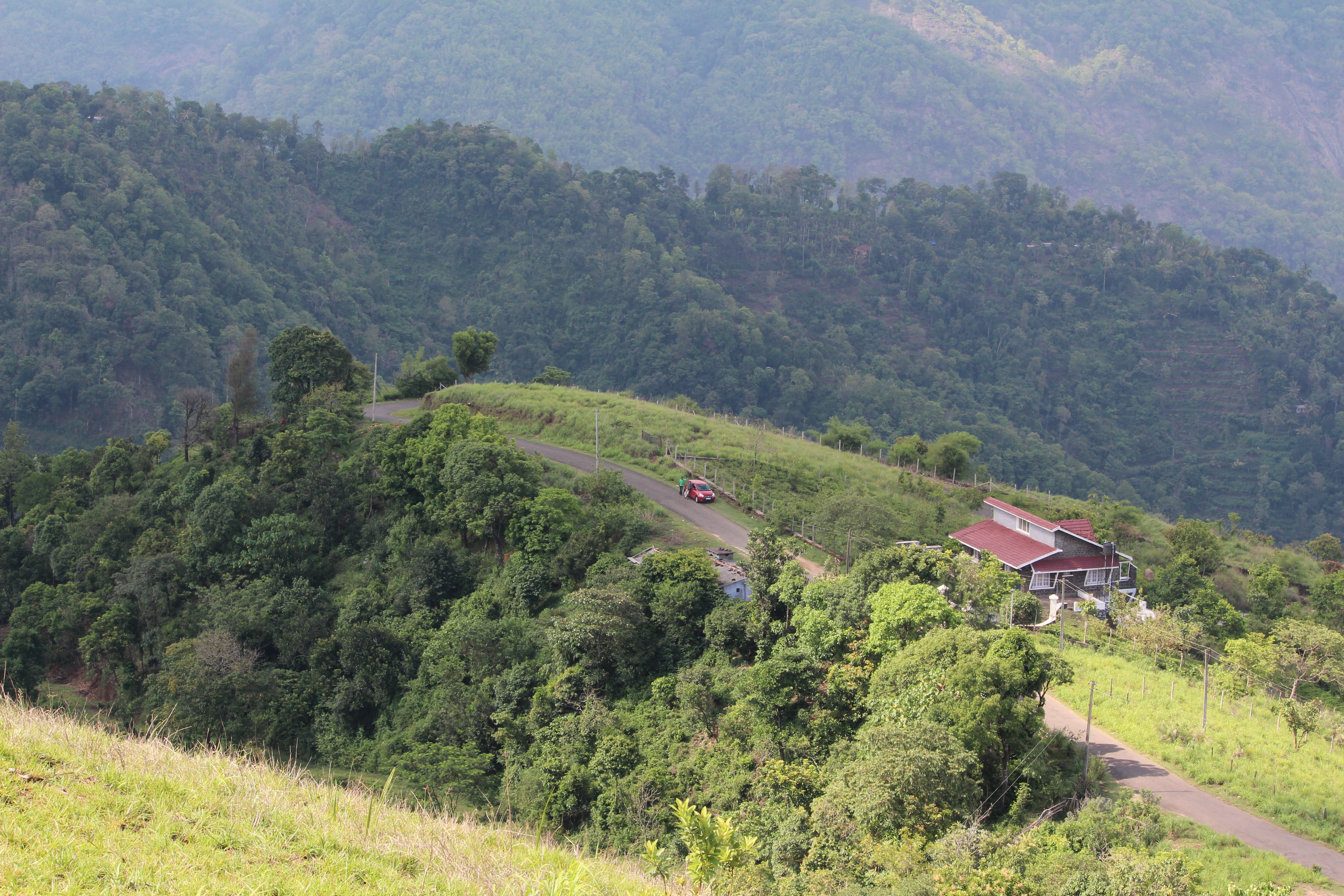
The road leading to Kanayankavayal via Panchalimedu

Panchalimedu is located on the route to Kanayankavayal in the Azhutha block of Peerumedu tehsil. Geographic coordinates of Panchalimedu is 9°34′15″N 77°00′52″E. The place can be accessed from Murinjapuzha (5 km) and Amalagiri (6 km) on the Kottayam - Kumily state highway (K.K road). People from west and south can reach there through Mundakkayam - Thekkemala route. Jeep and auto services are available from Murinjapuzha at fair rates. There are two hills at Panchalimedu, one has the temple dedicated to Bhuvaneswari Devi.

== Nearby attractions ==
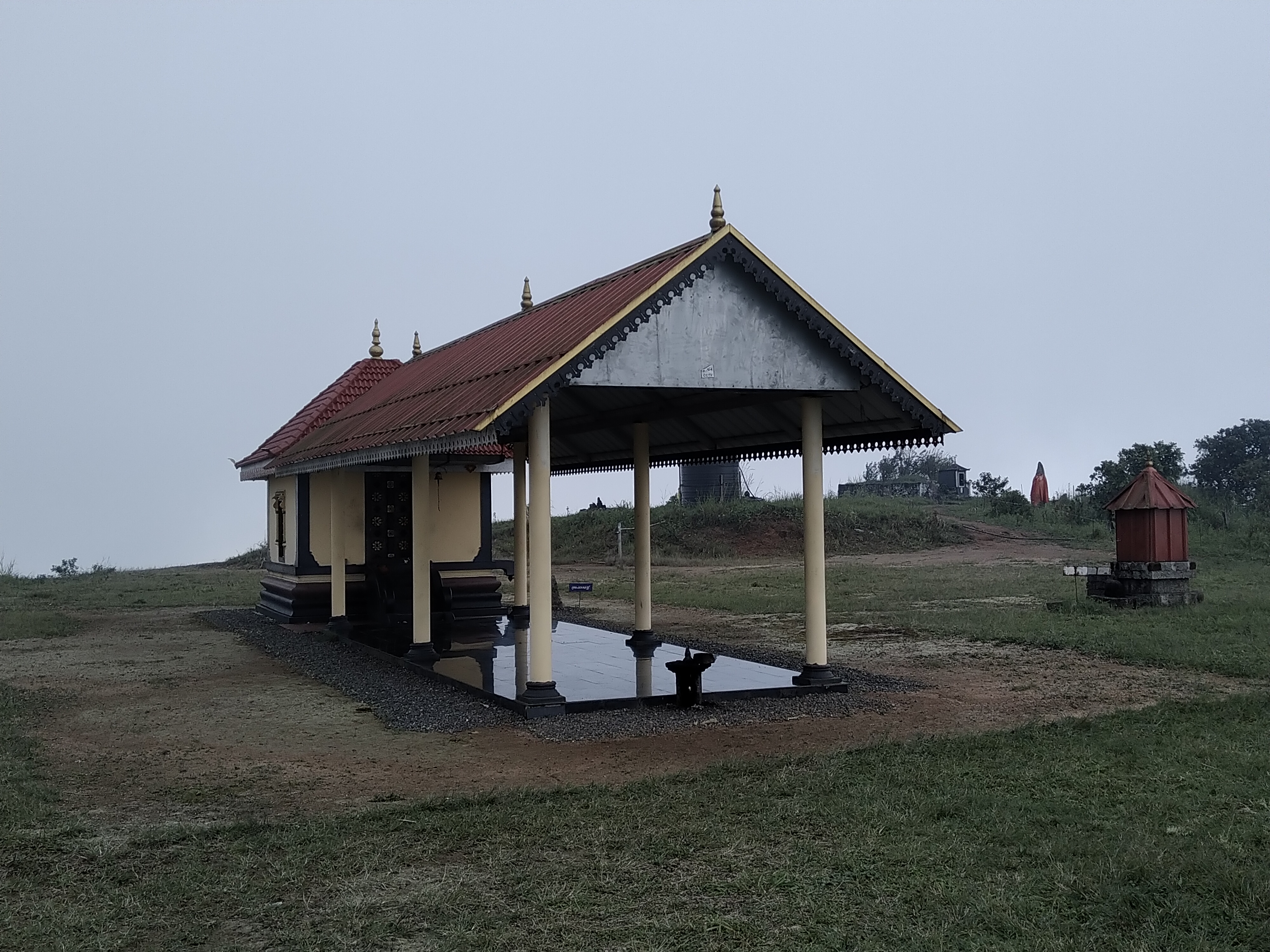
Panchalimedu Temple

- Parunthumpara: It is about 22 km (14 mi) from here, situated at a height of 3,600 ft (1,100 m) from mean sea level and also a popular tourist destination in Idukki district.
- Peeru hills: It is a panoramic hill station named after 'Peer Mohammed', who was a Sufi saint.
- Valanjanganam falls: It is only 6 km (3.7 mi) from here, a scenic waterfall locally known as Ninnumullippara located on the route to Kuttikkanam from Mundakkayam.
- Valliyamkavu Devi Temple: This historic temple lies 10 km (6.2 mi) southeast to Panchalimedu and it is dedicated to Goddess Durga.

== Legend ==
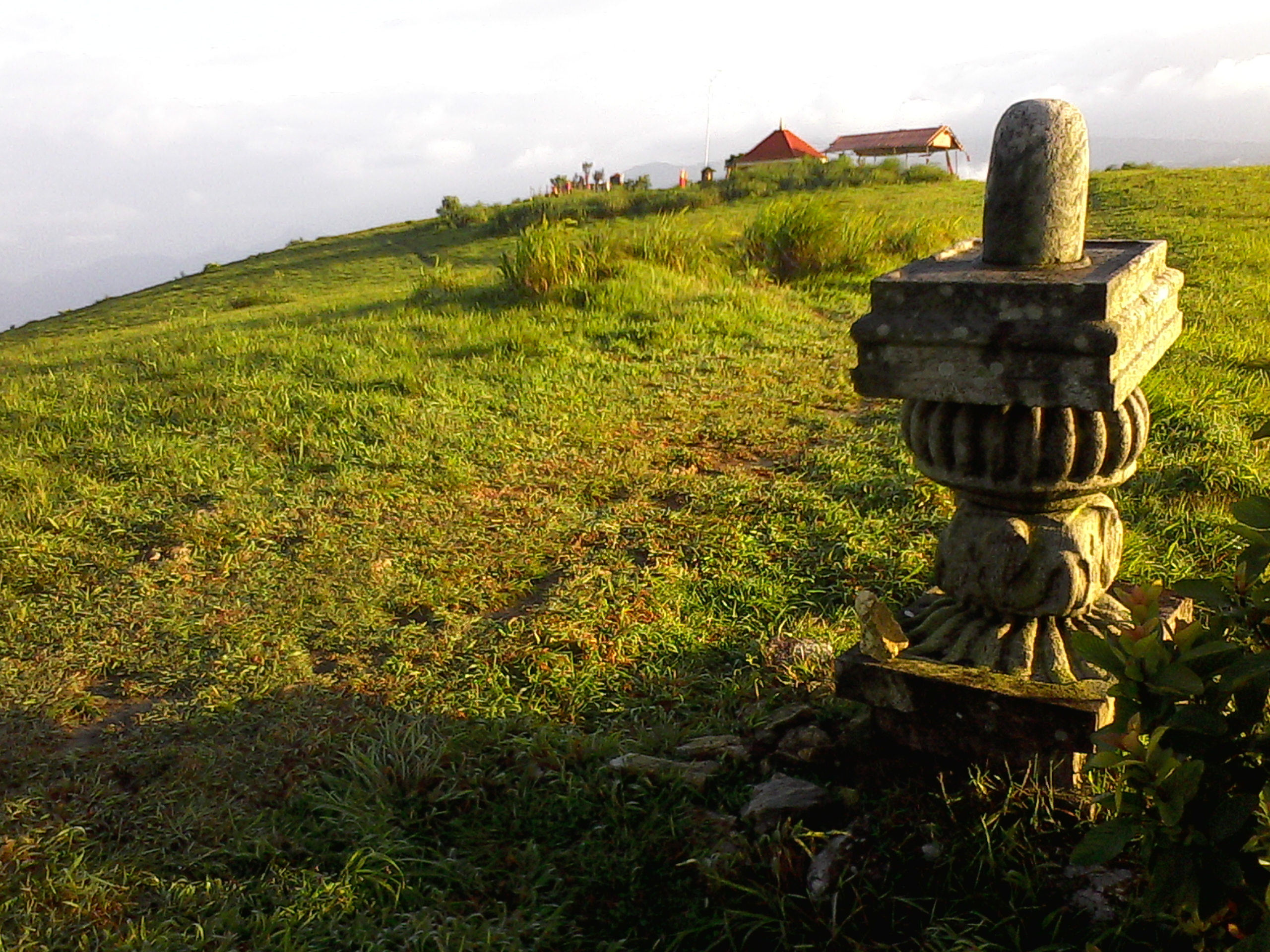
Shivalinga with the shrine of Bhuvaneswari Devi at Panchalimedu

According to the local legend, Pandavas along with their spouse Panchali had a sojourn there at time of one-year exile. Hence the place got its name Panchalimedu which derived from the words "Panchali" (Draupadi) and "medu" (hill). The local tribes there offered selfless helps to the Kuru princes. Pandavas left the region before the beginning of one year incognito. They rewarded an idol of Goddess Durga to the tribal chief for their helps and instructed them to worship Devi. But, unexpected incidents occurred when the tribes worshipped Devi by following their own uncivilized puja methods. Hence the place became uninhabitable for them. Later, Devi herself moved to the present Valliyamkavu region and presided there. In light of this myth, people still believe that Panchalimedu is the moola sthana or sanctum sanctorum of Devi.

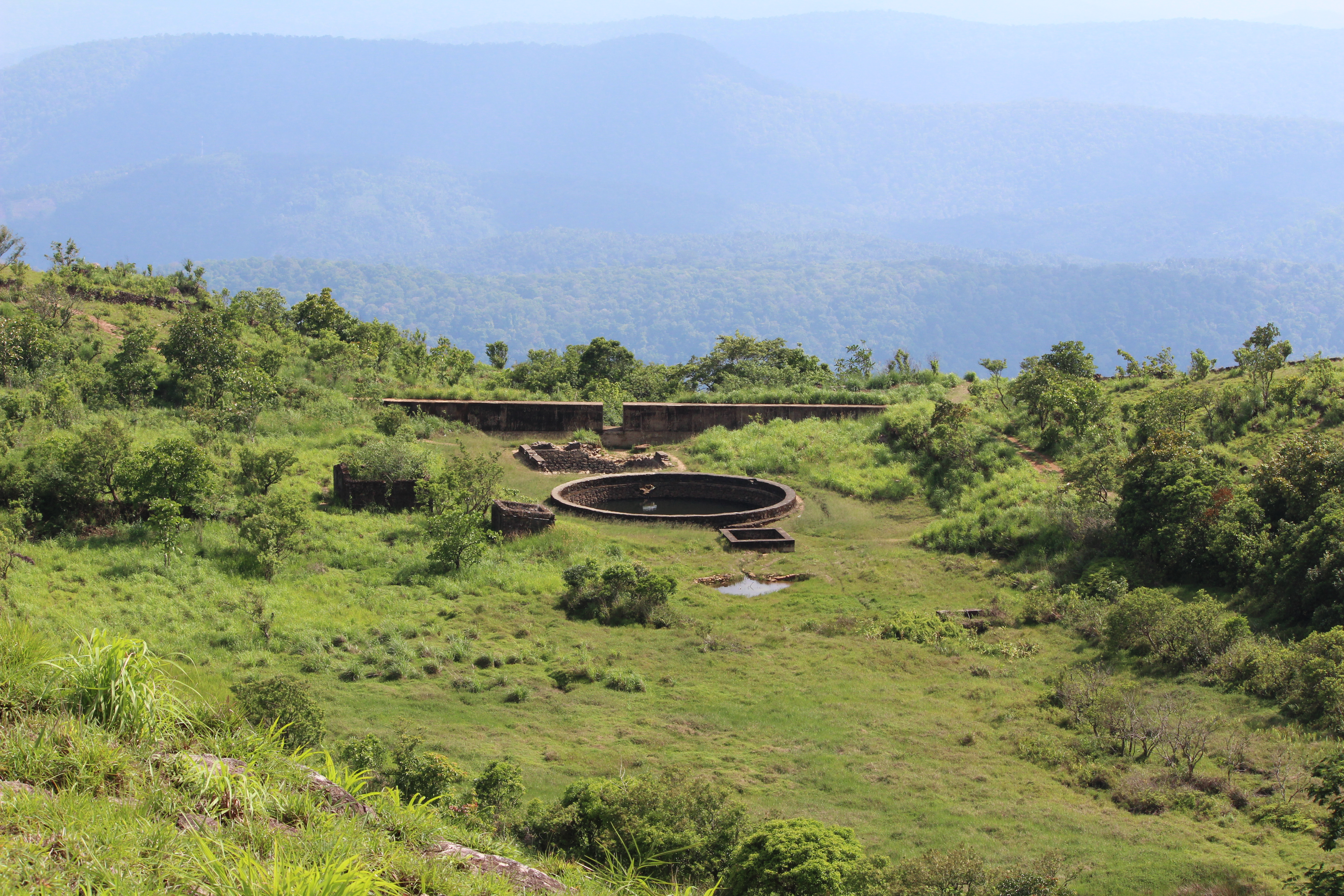
Panchalikulam (the pond of Panchali), believed to be constructed by the Pandavas

At present, there is a small temple dedicated to the goddess Bhuvaneswari, which can be approached by a walkway from the main road. The temple, which did not have daily poojas in the past, is currently under the administration of Travancore Devaswom Board. The granite edicts found there depicts the linkage of the place to ancient history. Several Shiva lingas, Trishulas (trident) and Nāga idols are also placed near the shrine. A small circular pond known as Panchalikulam is situated there, in which Pandavas and Panchali took their daily bath. It is about 5 dm (20 in) in diameter. Even during hot summers, it will be filled by plenty of water. One cave also exist there named Pandavaguha (cave of Pandavas), in which the footprints of Bhima can be witnessed. Local folks still believe that it is the footprints of the mighty Bhima himself.

== 2019 controversy ==
In 2019, the Church authorities installed two crosses on the hill. Meanwhile, a Hindu group installed a Trishula near the cross as a way of protesting the Church's alleged attempt to encroach upon revenue land. This caused controversy. The District Collector sent a notice to church authorities to remove the crosses and soon it was removed. Refuting the claims of the Travancore Devaswom Board, Idukki collector said that Tranvancore Devaswom Board does not have any land in Panchalimedu. Even the temple at the place is located at the revenue land.
