= Valliyamkavu Devi Temple =

- Valliyamkavu Devi Temple, Paloorkavu, Kottayam, Kerala

Religion
- Affiliation: Hinduism
- District: Kottayam
- Deity: Durga, Bhadra
- Festivals: Thiru ulsavam and Pongala in Meenam
- Governing body: Travancore Devaswom Board

Location
- Location: Paloorkavu
- State: Kerala
- Country: India
- Interactive map of Valliyamkavu Devi Temple
- Coordinates: 9°31′32.7″N 76°57′21.8″E

Architecture
- Type: Traditional Kerala style
- Completed: 2001

Specifications
- Temple: One
- Elevation: 237.73 m (780 ft)

Website
- www.valliyamkavudevitemple.com

Valliyamkavilamma
- Malayalam: വളളിയാംകാവിലമമ
- Affiliation: Devi
- Abode: Valliyamkavu.
- Planet: Earth
- Mantra: ഓം ഐം ക്ലീം സൗ ഹ്രീം ഭദ്രകാള്യൈനമ, ഓം ഹ്രീം ദും ദുർഗ്ഗായൈ നമ
- Weapon: Trident, Bow and arrow, Sword, Mace
- Mount: Lion

Valliyamkavu Devi Temple is a historic Durga shrine located near Travancore Rubber and Tea Company, 15 km (9.3 mi) east to 35th mile near Mundakkayam. The temple and its surroundings fall under the Peerumedu tehsil of Idukki district.

== Location ==
The temple is surrounded by hills and forests and situated near to Travancore Rubber and Tea Company. Both private and state-run busses operates to the temple from Mundakkayam. Auto, jeep and other taxies are also available from 35th mile at fair rates

=== Distances to the temple from various places ===
- Mundakkayam - 23 km
- Paloorkavu - 10 km
- Panchalimedu - 10 km
- Thekkemala - 1.6 km
- Kanayankavayal - 16 km
- Kumily - 50 km
- Kottayam - 63 km
- Changanassery - 66 km

== Myths and beliefs ==
The history of the temple is as old as Dvapara Yuga. Pandavas (heroes in the famous epic Mahabharata) along with their wife Draupadi, during the time of exile reached the present Panchalimedu and stayed here for a long time. The tribes settled here offered helps to them. Before Pandavas left the place, they gave an idol of Durga Devi to the tribal chief and acknowledged them to pay tribute to the Goddess. But the tribes unaware about the pooja methods followed their own traditions which transformed Devi into 'Bhadra', a more fierce and aggressive form. Thus the place became uninhabitable for the tribes. Devi reached the present Valliyamkavu region through the forest ropes. Thus the region came to be known as Valliyadikkavu which in course of time became Valliyamkavu. Later, 'Vanchipuzha Thamburan' granted permission to the Aadivasi moopan to worship the Goddess. 22 acres (8.9 ha) of land was given for the temple construction.

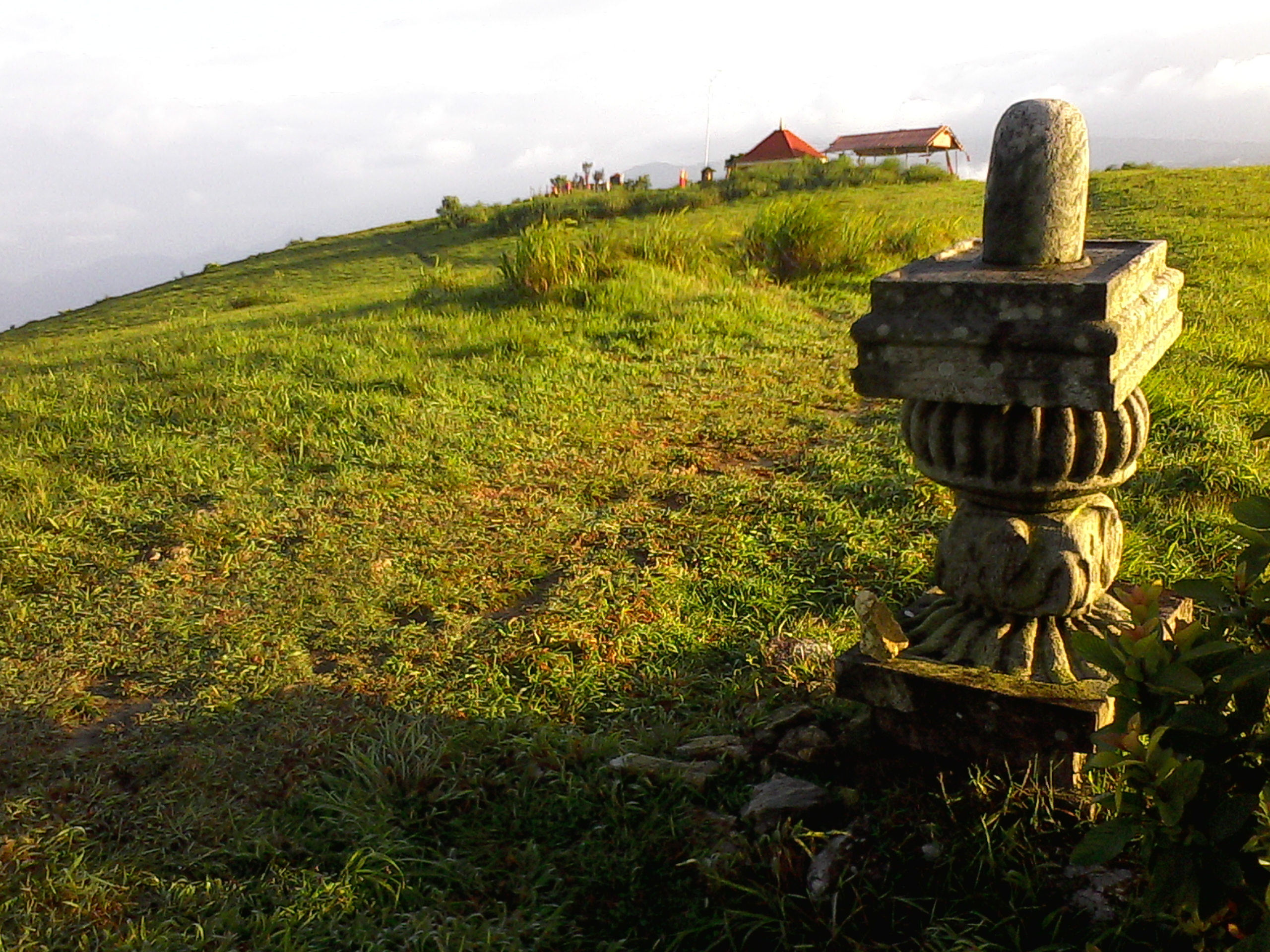
Bhuvaneswari Devi shrine behind the linga at Panchalimedu, believed to the moolasthana of Devi

The tribes worshipped Devi in their own ways which led to the increased powers of Devi. Devotees from various places arrived at the temple hearing the Powers of Devi. The temple itself achieved great fame and glory due to the presence of Bhadra. Travancore Devaswom Board refused to take over the temple as it followed rigorous practices. A case was filed in the court against the human and animal sacrifices. The court instructed the devaswom board to acquire the rights of the temple after the death of Kandankonthi, the tribal chief. In 1993, the board acquired the rights of the temple following the death of Kandankonthi. Many modifications were brought in the temple administration and pooja traditions. As of the Devaprasnam, separate shrines for subordinate deities like Shiva, Ganapathi, Sree Bhuvaneswari devi, Nagaraja, Nagayakshi and Kalayakshi were construed. Thus the temple undergone many changes.

== Poojas ==
Eight poojas are held here everyday including palliyunarthal, nadathurakkal, usha pooja and ucha pooja in the morning section. Evening section includes Nadathurakkal, Deeparadhana, Attazhapooja, Nadaadakkal and Guruthi.

== The Festivals ==
The Thiruutsavam and Pongala is hosted in the month of May (Meenam), in the presence of many pilgrims. Durgashtami is also an important event. Special weekly days are Tuesday and Friday. Narangavilakku and aiswariya poojas are held on Fridays.
