= Paloorkavu =

Village in Kerala, India

- Village
- Location in Kerala, India Paloorkavu (India)
- Coordinates: 9°32′10″N 76°56′15″E
- Country: India
- State: Kerala
- District: Idukki
- Taluk: Peermade

Government
  - Type: Panchayat
  - Body: Peruvanthanam Grama Panchayat

Languages
  - Official: Malayalam, English
- Time zone: UTC+5:30 (IST)
- PIN: 685532
- Area code: 04869
- Vehicle registration: KL-37

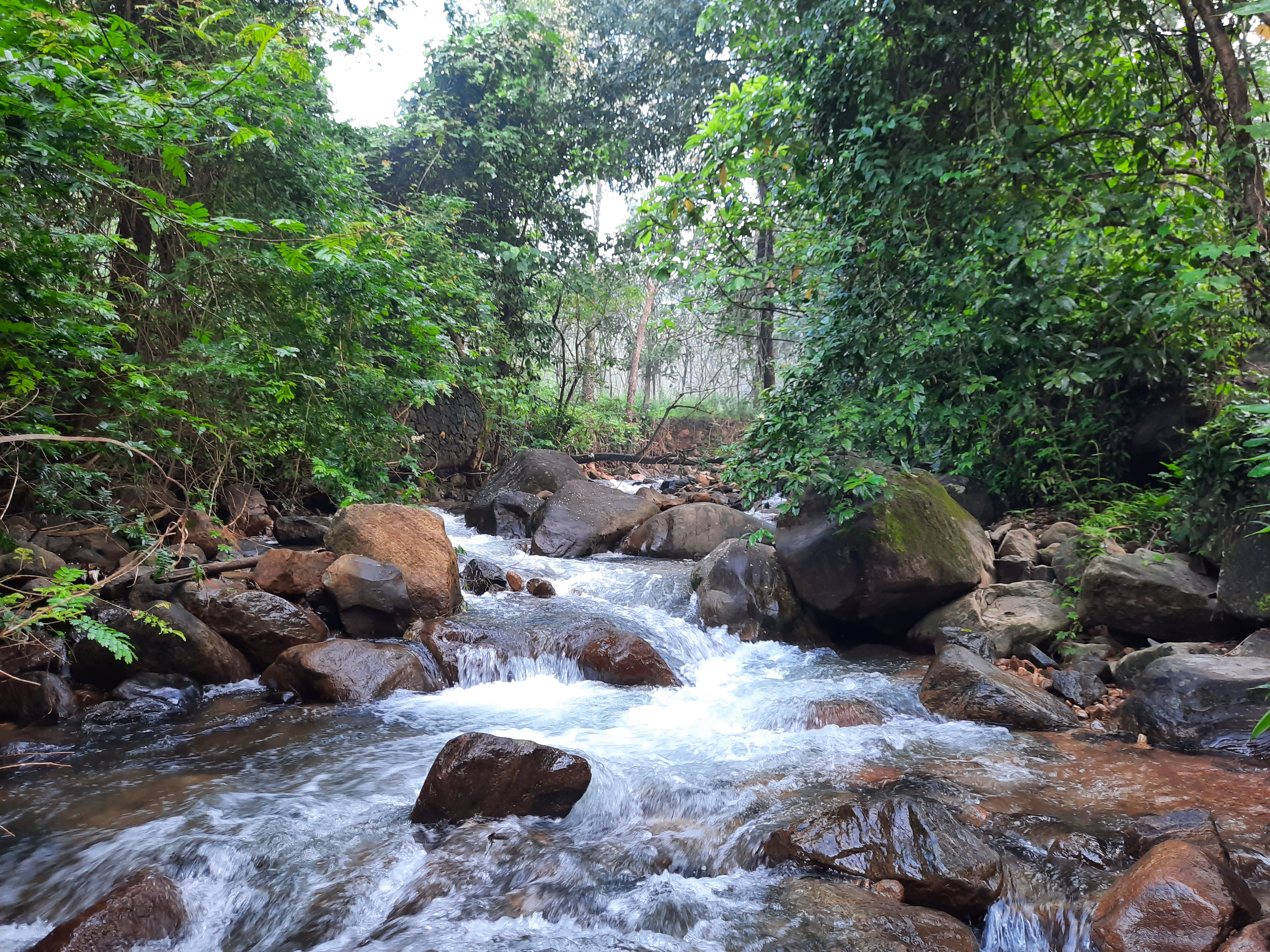
Paloorkavu River

Paloorkavu is a small village in Peruvanthanam panchayat of Peermade taluk in Idukki district, Kerala state, India. It consists of around 500 residences and one church (St. George's) and a temple. A small river flows through this village. Nearby places include Thekkemala (peruvanthanam), Mundakkayam and Panchalimedu.
