= Pasuppara =

Village in Kerala, India

- Village
- Location in Kerala, India Pasuppara (India)
- Coordinates: 9°41′24″N 76°58′7″E
- Country: India
- State: Kerala
- District: Idukki
- Taluk: Peerumedu

Government
  - Type: Panchayat
  - Body: Upputhara Grama Panchayat

Languages
  - Official: Malayalam, English
- Time zone: UTC+5:30 (IST)
- PIN: 685501
- Area code: 04869
- Vehicle registration: KL-37

Pasuppara is a small village near Elappara in Idukki district of Kerala state, India. It is about 12 km (7.5 mi) from Elappara and 12 km (7.5 mi) from Vagamon. The factory of AVT Tea Plantations is situated in Pasuppara. There is a small river that flows eastward from the village and joins Periyar near Elappara.
