= M. Appavu =

Indian politician

14th Speaker of Tamil Nadu Legislative Assembly
- In office 12 May 2021 – 10 May 2026
- Governor: Banwarilal Purohit; R. N. Ravi
- Chief Government Whip: P. Ramachandran
- CM: M. K. Stalin
- Deputy Speaker: K. Pitchandi
- Preceded by: P. Dhanapal
- Succeeded by: J. C. D. Prabhakar
- Constituency: Radhapuram

Member of the Tamil Nadu Legislative Assembly
- In office 11 May 2021 – 4 May 2026
- Preceded by: I. S. Inbadurai
- Succeeded by: Dr. Sathish Christopher
- Constituency: Radhapuram
- In office 10 May 1996 — 14 May 2011
- Preceded by: Ramani Nallathambi
- Succeeded by: S. Michael Rayappan
- Constituency: Radhapuram

Personal details
- Born: 20 January 1952 (age 74) Tirunelveli, Madras State, India
- Party: Dravida Munnetra Kazhagam (2006-Present)
- Other political affiliations: Tamil Maanila Congress (1996-2001); Independent (2001-2006); Janata Dal (United) (2004)
- Spouse: Vijaya
- Children: 3 (2 sons and 1 daughter)
- Parent: Muthuvelayudha Perumal
- Profession: Teacher; Politician

Muthuvelayudha Perumal Appavu, better known as M. Appavu, is an Indian politician and former Member of the Legislative Assembly in Tamil Nadu. He is the former speaker of the Tamil Nadu Legislative Assembly. He has contested and won from the Radhapuram constituency four times.

== Political career ==
Appavu has been described by The Hindu as a regional "heavyweight" of the Indian National Congress (INC) who joined a splinter group, then stood for election as an independent during a period of intra-party troubles, and eventually transferred his allegiance to the Dravida Munnetra Kazhagam (DMK). He has been elected to the Tamil Nadu legislative assembly as a Tamil Maanila Congress (Moopanar) candidate from Radhapuram in the 1996 election, as an independent candidate in 2001 and as a DMK candidate in 2006.

The Radhapuram constituency was not contested by the DMK in the 2011 elections because they entered into an alliance with the INC. In the 2016 elections, Appavu again contested the seat as a DMK candidate. In a surprise result, he lost by 49 votes to I. S. Inbadurai of the All India Anna Dravida Munnetra Kazhagam (AIADMK). This was the narrowest losing margin in the state and he appealed against the outcome, arguing amongst other things that the Returning Officer had improperly rejected some postal votes. He had staged a protest regarding the matter at the time of the count, which led to him being evicted from the building.

He contested the 2021 assembly election from Radhapuram constituency as a DMK candidate and won with a margin of about 5000 votes.

In May 2021, he was elected unopposed as the speaker of the 16th Tamil Nadu Legislative Assembly.

He contested the 2026 assembly election from Radhapuram constituency as a DMK candidate and lost with a margin of about 12000 votes to TVK candidate Sathish Christopher.

== Campaigning ==
Appavu's campaigning for farmers' rights has led him to file Public Interest Litigation papers on several occasions. In 2013, he spoke in court of the need to impose minimum price controls on agricultural produce in order to reduce the alleged incidence of suicide among farmers and to prevent profiteering by middlemen. He also wanted an improved agricultural insurance scheme to ward against the effects of crop losses that occurred as a consequence of natural events.

Appavu has also been associated with matters relating to water supplies and was responsible for the introduction of drinking water schemes that use the Ponnankurichi and Tamirabarani rivers. In 2017, he won an order at the Madras High Court that the Government of Tamil Nadu should comply with the court's instructions of 2002 to investigate the relationship between incidences of water scarcity and the practice of river sand quarrying for construction purposes. At the same time, he was campaigning against water extraction from the Tamirabarani river by businesses associated with PepsiCo and Coca-Cola. He argued that the government was preferring the needs of the businesses over those of the population in area where water was scarce. He said that while other businesses that took more water were justified in doing so, the soft drinks businesses were exploitative because they were "commodifying water by fetching it for a minuscule price and selling it later for an astronomically higher price".

There was some controversy in 2009 when there was an attempt to name a bus-stand in Radhapuram after the parents of DMK leader, Karunanidhi, and to erect statues commemorating them. The AIADMK claimed that the DMK-led government was facilitating the idea but the government said that the project was led by Appavu and 90 per cent funded by him. After much back-and-forth disputation, the stand was eventually named in honour of K. Kamaraj in 2010.

== Electoral history ==
| Year | Constituency | Party | Votes | % | Opponent | Opponent Party | Opponent Votes | % | Result | Margin | % |
|---|---|---|---|---|---|---|---|---|---|---|---|
| 1996 | Radhapuram | TMC(M) | 45,808 | 46.60 | S. K. Chandrasekaran | INC | 16,862 | 17.15 | Won | 28,946 | 29.45 |
| 2001 | Radhapuram | Independent | 44,619 | 45.40 | S. Jothi | PMK | 26,338 | 26.80 | Won | 18,281 | 18.60 |
| 2006 | Radhapuram | DMK | 49,249 | 43.36 | L. Gnanapunitha | AIADMK | 38,552 | 33.94 | Won | 10,697 | 9.42 |
| 2016 | Radhapuram | DMK | 69,541 (Initial declaration) | 40.59 | I. S. Inbadurai | AIADMK | 69,590 (Initial declaration) | 40.62 | Won; Declared winner on June 3, 2026, by Madras High Court. Initial ECI result annulled. | 109 (Revised margin) -49 (Initial margin) | 0.06 |
| 2021 | Radhapuram | DMK | 82,331 | 44.17 | I. S. Inbadurai | AIADMK | 76,406 | 40.99 | Won | 5,925 | 3.18 |
| 2026 | Radhapuram | DMK | 57,634 | 28.83 | Dr. Sathish Christopher | TVK | 69,947 | 34.99 | Lost | 12,313 | 6.16 |
