= S. Muthuramalingam =

Indian politician

S. Muthuramalingam was an Indian politician and former Member of the Legislative Assembly. He was elected to the Tamil Nadu Legislative Assembly as a Gandhi Kamaraj National Congress candidate from Radhapuram constituency in 1980 election.
