= Kuttikkanam =

- Hill station
- Location in Kerala, India Kuttikkanam (India)
- Coordinates: 9°34′42″N 76°58′22″E
- Country: India
- State: Kerala
- District: Idukki
- Named for: Steep slopes, valleys and hairpin roads

Government
  - Type: Panchayath
  - Body: Peerumedu grama panchayath

Languages
  - Official: Malayalam, English
- Time zone: UTC+5:30 (IST)
- Postal code: 685531
- Vehicle registration: KL-37

Kuttikkanam is a hill station in Idukki district, Kerala state, India. It is 3,500 feet (1,100 m) above sea level and surrounded by lush green tea plantations. It is within the territory of Peermade. Kanjirappally and Mundakayam are the nearest towns.

== History ==
In the 16th century the territory was under the rule of Changanacherry kings and was uninhabited. In 1756, the King of Travancore conquered Changanacherry, and brought the place under his supremacy. A Church Mission Society missionary, Henry Baker, started coffee plantations, and under the regency of Sri Moolam Thirunal these became tea plantations.

Under the British Raj in India, Kuttikkanam became an up-market resort. Since at first there was no road but only a pathway, the British started the Aerial Ropeway Ltd, Travancore state's first public limited company. The summer palace of the Travancore kings was located in Kuttikkanam.

During the British period and after, manpower was brought to Kuttikkanam from various parts of Kerala and Tamil Nadu. The descendants of these migrant workers constitute the major part of the population of Kuttikkanam.

== Surroundings ==
- Peeru Hills: About 1 km distance.
- Grampi: Commonly known as Parunthumpara, a rock sculpture about 150 ft (46 m) high and about 3,800 feet (1,200 m) above sea level.
- Thottapura: The place where the Travancore royal family stored weapons.
- Baker Hills (Thrisangu Hills): Rolling hills with views.
- Panchalimedu: a viewpoint, according to legend one of the many hiding places of the Pandavas and Panchali. From a pond known as Panchalikkulam the "Makarajyothi", can be seen, the divine flame lit during the pilgrimage season in Sabarimala.
- Valanjanganam falls: A main attraction of Kuttikkanam, also known as Ninnumullippara. The waterfall is about 75 ft (23 m) in height and is usually covered in mist.
- Nallathanni viewpoint: On the Kottayam-Kumily National Highway.
- Artificial Pine Forest: A dense pine forest covering 100 acres (0.40 km^{2}). Contains an estimated 30 species of birds, including rare endangered species. It is classified as a buffer zone by the Department of Forests and Wildlife, Kerala.
- Azhutha Diversion Project: A project constructed by the Kerala government on the Azhutha river, diverting water to Idukki Reservoir through a 987 m-long (3,238 ft) tunnel.

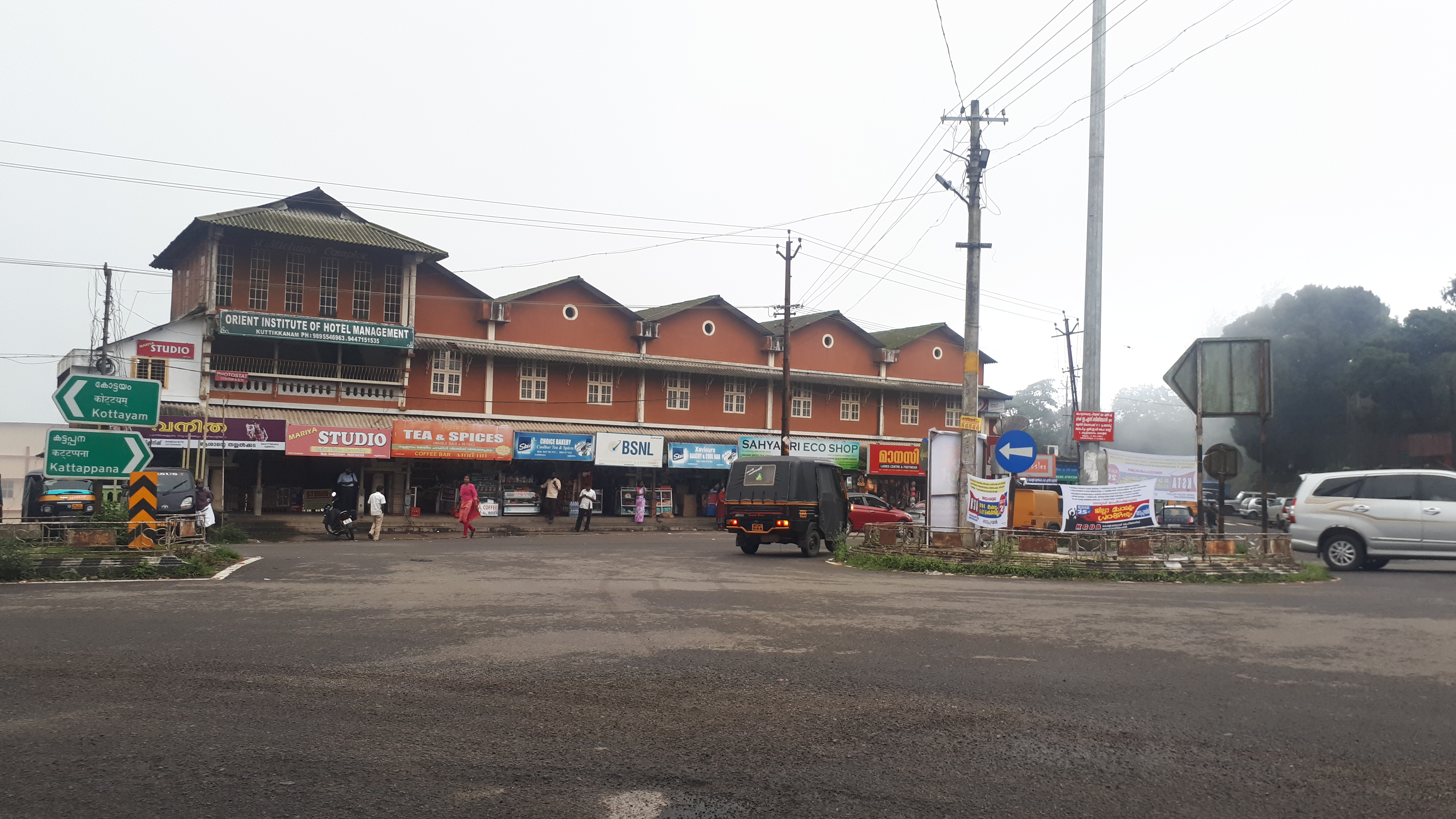
An evening at Kuttikkanam

== Educational Institutions ==
- Marian International Institute of Management
- Marian College Kuttikkanam
- Mar Baselios Christian College of Engineering and Technology, Kuttikanam
- IHRD College Kuttikkanam
- St. Pius X English School Kuttikanam
- St. Joseph's Malayalam Lower Primary School, Kuttikanam
- Government Model Residential School (GMRS), Kuttikanam
- Sahyadri Institute of Ayurveda Nursing & Panchakarma
- Mariagiri English Medium Higher Secondary School, Kuttikanam

== Gallery ==
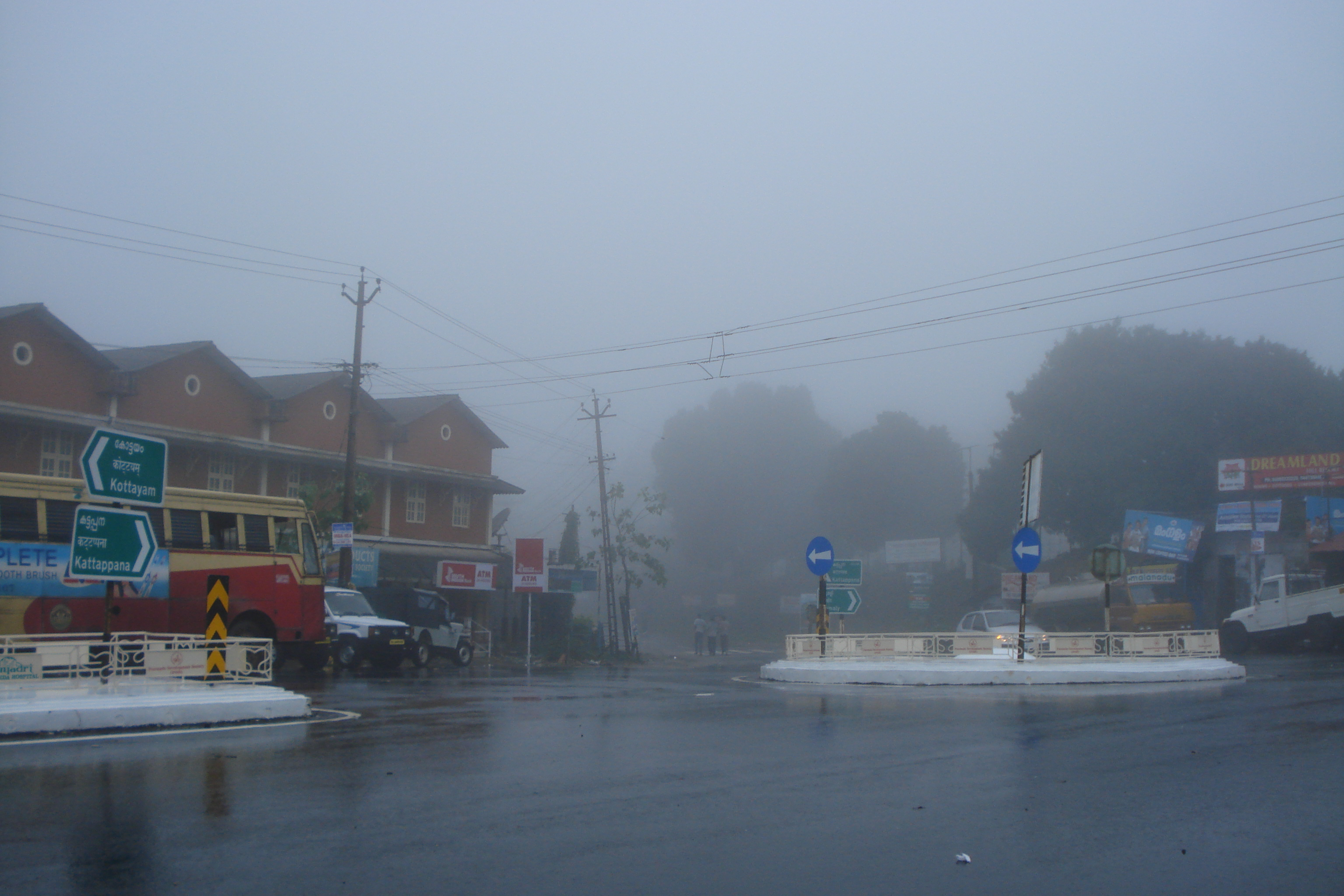
Kuttikkanam on a foggy day

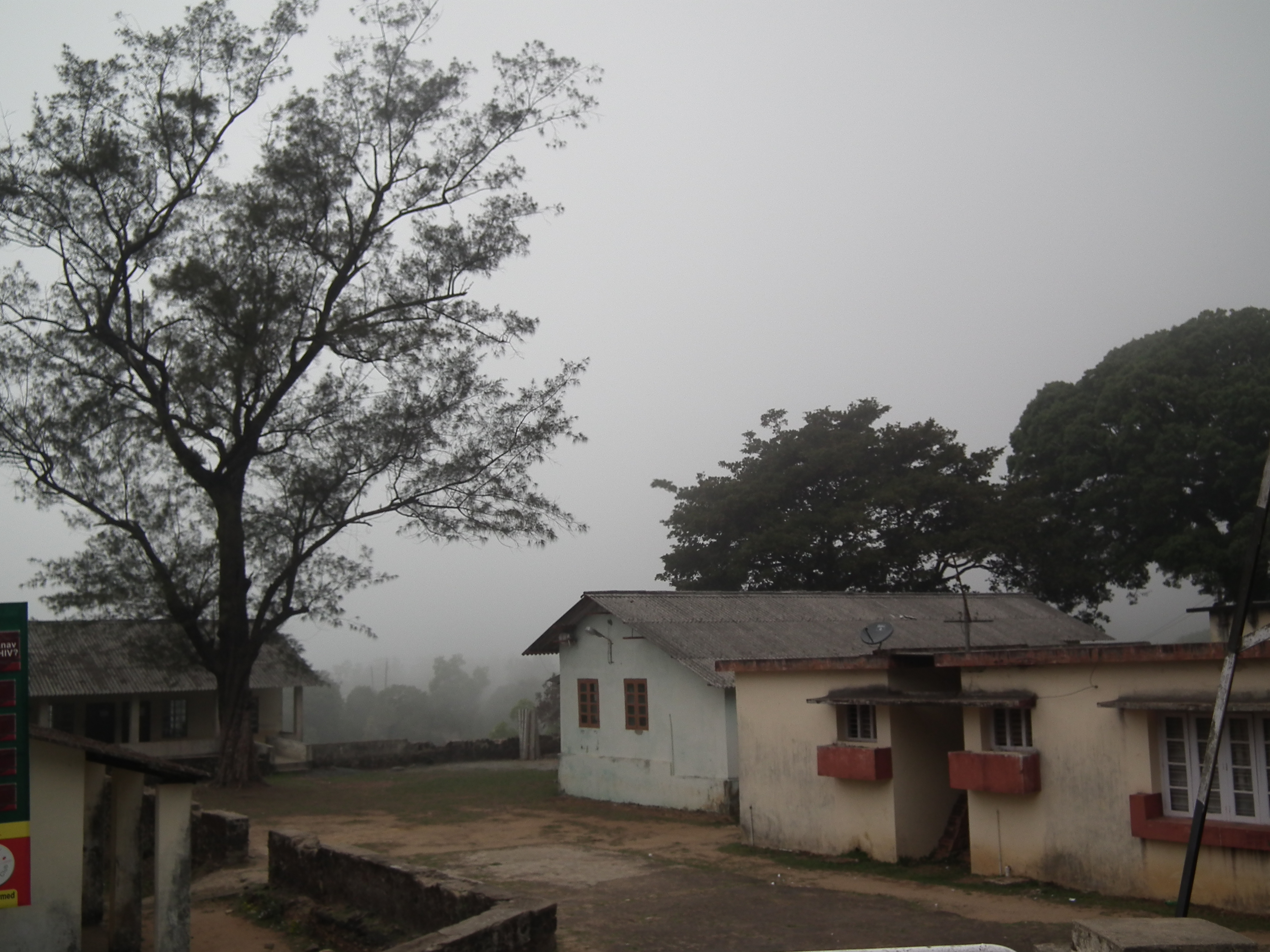
College of Applied Science

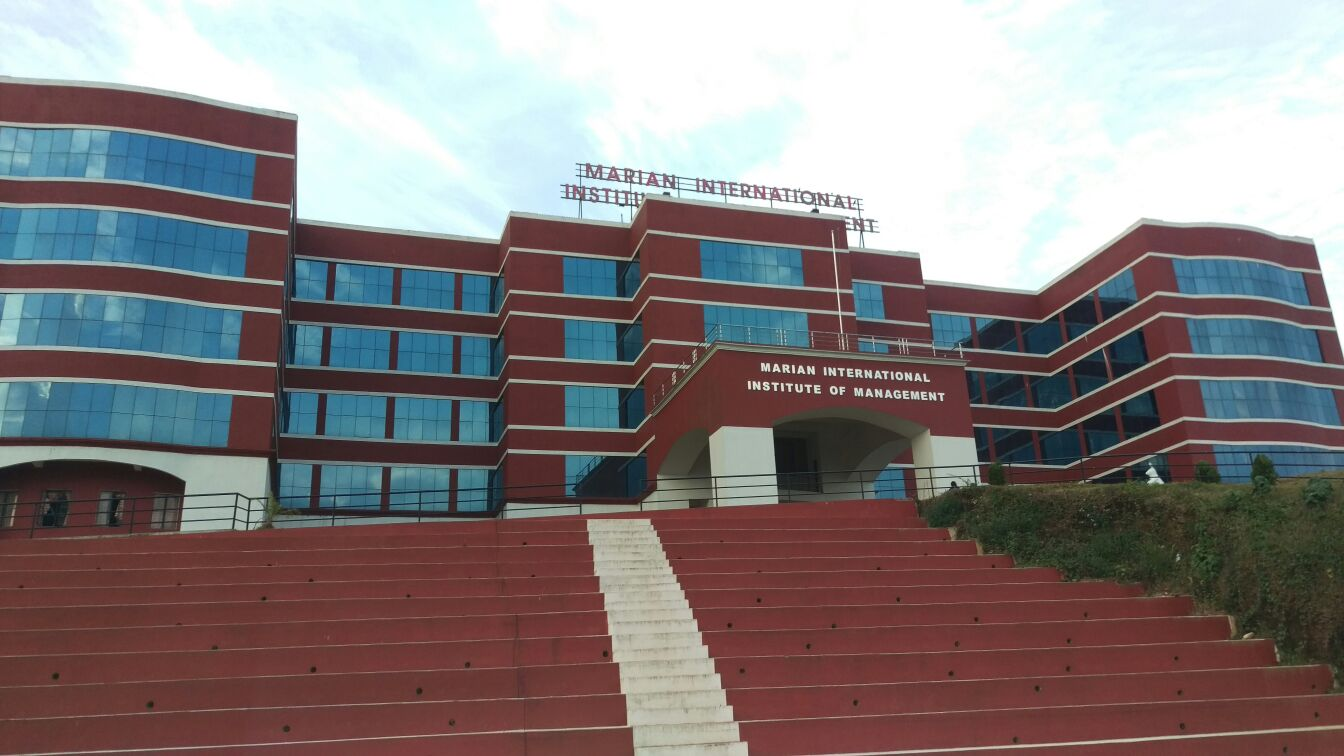
Marian International Institute of management, Kuttikkanam

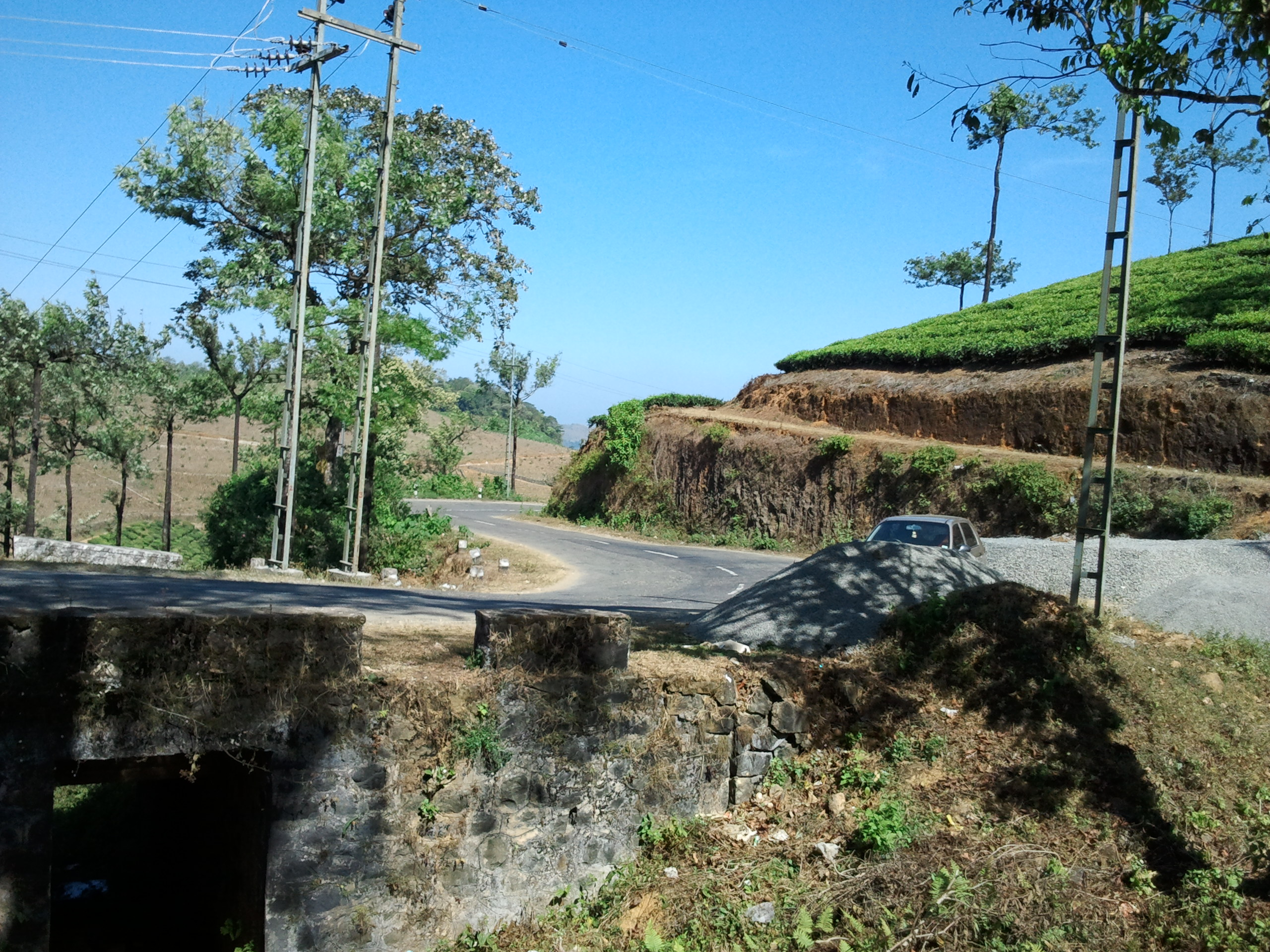
Kattappana Kuttikkanam road

== See also ==
Kattappana

== Books ==
- The Story of Peermade by George Thengummoottil (ISBN 9788192888606)
