= H. Mujeeb Rahman =

Indian writer

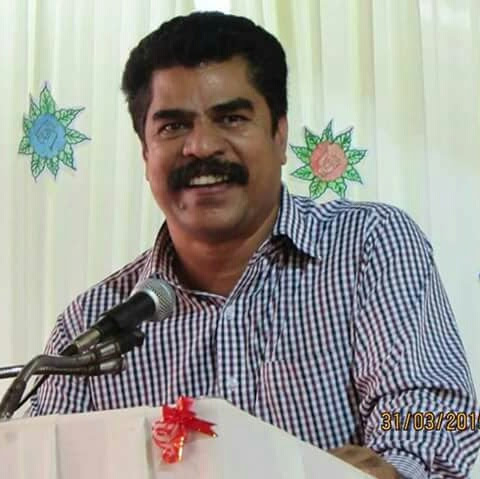
- Born: 28 September 1971 (age 54); Padmanabhapuram, Kanyakumari district, Tamil Nadu, India
- Education: Manonmaniam Sundaranar University
- Occupations: professor, writer
- Spouse: Misiria
- Children: Athil; Adhirah
- Website: mujeebu.in

H. Mujeeb Rahman (born 28 September 1971) is a Tamil language writer. His works include short stories, novels, short films, criticism and sufism. His work, combining magical realism with Historiographic metafiction, is primarily concerned with the many connections, disruptions, and exchanges between Tamil Muslims and Arabic civilizations, with much of his fiction being set on the Gulf and India.

== Personal life ==
Mujeeb Rahman is a son of Hassan and Kadija Beevi, who lived in Padmanabhapuram in Kanyakumari District in Tamil Nadu.He has three brothers. Till he was twenty five years old, his family lived in Valiya Veedu (the name of the house) in North street in Padmanabhapuram and then moved to Thuckalay. After finishing his schooling in Thuckalay, he completed his U.G and P.G Degrees In Scott Christian College in Nagercoil his studies he worked in Gujarat and Bombay for a few years, then worked in Saudi Arabia, Turkey, Malaysia and AbuDhabi for fourteen years. Then came back to his motherland in 2008 and extended his service as Professor in National Engineering college. He has a wife named Missiria and two children, Athil and Adhirah.

== Creative works ==
He has been a member of Tamil Nadu Kalai Elakkia Perumantam since 1990. His early influences included Jorge Luis Borges, Mikhail Bulgakov, Lewis Carroll, Günter Grass, and James Joyce. His first short story was selected in a competition conducted by the Tamil magazine Kalachuvadu and Kadha Literary Movement.He is writing continueously in literary magazines like Puthiyakaatru, Thamari, Semmalar, Theeranadhi, Uyirmmai and so on. He started his writing inspired by the writers Ponneelan, Thopil Mohammed Meeran, H.G.Razool and Jeyamohan. 'Devathaikalin Sontha kuzhanthai', his first collection of short stories, was published by Pudpunal Publications in Chennai in 2005. M.G.Suresh mentioned this collection as Postmodern stories. 2007 Mujeeb's first novel 'Devathutharkalin Kavithaikal'was brought out. This is considered to be the first Post Novel in Tamil. Later in 2014 'Magagrindham' (a novel) was published by Pudueluthu pathipagam. In 2015 ' Oru Sufiyin Suyacharithai' (a collection of short stories) was brought out. This is considered to be Fragile Fiction. A thesis of 800 pages titled 'Nan ean Wahabi Alla' was published by Keetru Veliyetagam in 2016. Mujeeb, who is well versed in Postmodernism, Marxism, Postcolonialism and Folk studies, has participated in many conferences. He has also made a Tamil short film 'Vishayam'. He has rendered his service as theeEditor of many little magazines including Elathy and Karishalamkanni. Now he is a member of the editorial board of 'Thinai' which is a quarterly magazine.He conducted literary meets in the name of 'Karuthavavu' for some years. Joining hands with Elathy Trust he took initiative to give awards to qualified writers every year for their literary contributions. He is the founder of Elathy school of thoughts and managing director of Sufi school.

== Research on Sufi and Islamic studies ==
He was invited as a special guest to Sufi conference conducted in Kattankudy, Sri lanka. He delivered a speech in Thuckalay Peer Mohammed Dargah Urus. He wrote a commentary on 'Gynapukalchi'.He has given speeches on Sufism in many universities of India, Gulf counties and Sri Lanka. His speeches play an important role in Islamic conferences and seminars. He has written more than a hundred Islamic and Sufi articles. He speaks more about the Sufi principle of Wahtatul Ujud. Many of his speeches can be found on YouTube.

== Awards and honours ==
- His book titled Devathaikazhin sontha kuzhandhai was selected as the collection of best short stories.
- He was given an award by Puthiyakatru magazine for one of his story stories.
- He got Jeyandhan Award for his novel 'Mahakridham'.
- His works have been selected for PhD thesis in the University of Kerala.
- He was honoured for his works in Sri Lanka.

== Bibliography ==
1. Devathaikalin sontha kuzhanthai (Short story collection)
2. Mahakrandham (Novel)
3. Oru sufiyin suyacharithai (Short story collection)
4. Devathutharkalin kavithaikal (Novel)
5. Minimalism
6. Theory (Criticism)
7. Illuminati
8. Cholera kalathu kadhal (Novel/Trans)
9. Naan ean wahabi alla(Thesis)
10. Maruvasipu, maruchindanai, maruvilakam (Criticism)
11. Pinnaveenathuku pinthaiya kodpadukal (Criticism)
12. Pinnai Dalitism (Theory)
13. Nattar Islam
14. Verumoru Chalanam (Poem)
15. Jalaludeen rumi kavithaikal
16. Chrai kavithaikal
17. Matramaikai pesuvathu
18. Pirathiyin ullartham (Anthology of essays)
19. Tathuvam oru arimugam(Philosophy)
20. Penkaluku naadu illai (Trans)
21. En arputha eravukal (Trans)
22. Hegalin manathathuvam (Philosophy)
23. Oru nadoyin dairy kuripukal (Anthology of essays)
24. Prida (Novel/Trans)
25. Marxia agarathy
26. Sufi peragarathy
27. Ellam avane (Theology)
28. Pin navina Islam (Theory)
29. Magical realism (Theory)
30. Film Theory
31. Nausea (Novel/Trans)
32. Poorva Tamil Islam (Theology)
33. Arabukalin varalaru (Trans)
34. Jacques Ranciere (Anthology of essays)
35. Erandam palinam (Trans)
36. Elam thalaimurai Africa kataikal (Trans)
37. Entaiya Latin America kathaikal (Trans)
38. Magical Realisa kathaikal (Trans)
39. Anna Karenina oru ayvu
40. Melai novelkal vimarchanam
41. Moby Dick (Novel/Trans)
42. Kadal onai (Novel/Trans)
43. Elantha ulagam (Novel/Trans)
44. Psycho (Novel/Trans)
45. Sheik Mujibur rahmanin chirai kuripugal
46. Satya jitrayin muntu novelgal (Novel/Trans)
47. Karunthulai (Trans)
48. Murai patiya urai (Philosophy)
49. Ozhukankalin apouthigam (Philosophy)
50. Exorcist (Novel/Trans)
