= A. V. Thomas =

Indian businessman and politician

Member of the Madras State Assembly
- In office 1957–1962
- Preceded by: V. Karthesan
- Constituency: Radhapuram

Personal details
- Party: Indian National Congress

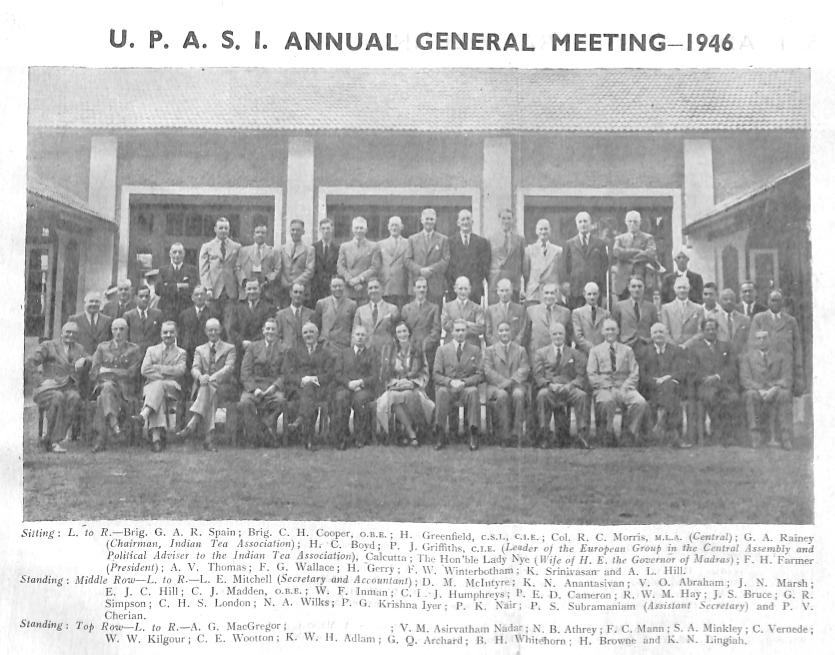
A. V. Thomas (sitting 10th from left) at a UPASI meeting in 1946

Alfred Vedam Thomas (9 August 1891 – 12 May 1968) was an Indian businessman and politician, and a Member of the Legislative Assembly.

A child of Abraham Moses, A. V. Thomas was born in Thirulmalnagar, Alagapappuram on 9 August 1891 and educated in Idaiyangudi and Sawyerpuram. He married Sugirtham in 1921 and with her had a son and three daughters. He was a Christian from the Nadar caste.

Thomas was a labour contractor who became a plantation owner and founded the AVT Group in 1925. (Note: In 2008, the AVT Group held around 4,500 hectares (11,000 acres) of land on which it cultivated cardamom, coffee, rubber, spices and tea. It also had interests in agro-chemicals, bio-technology, leather, shipping and warehousing.) He was President of Alleppey Municipal Council between 1937 and 1940, chairman of the Indian Rubber Board between 1947 and 1949, and again from 1950 until at least 1951. He also served on a Royal Commission during World War II.

Thomas was elected to the Tamil Nadu legislative assembly as an Indian National Congress (INC) candidate from Radhapuram constituency in the 1957 election. He had previously been a Member of Parliament elected to the Lok Sabha from Srivaikuntam constituency, Tamil Nadu, as an INC candidate in the 1951 election.

Thomas died on 12 May 1968.

== Business ==
A.V. Thomas was the founding owner of leading family-owned business group in South India, The A.V.T. Group of companies that is based in Chennai. The business began through its plantation company that bought a 100 hectares of land in Pasuppara, Idukki district of Kerala and converted the same into a tea plantation. Thus Mr. Thomas became the first Indian to own a plantation company. The group later diversified into other areas of plantation such as rubber mainly in hilly regions of Kerala and set up its iconic AVT brand of tea in the market. In Kerala, the main business center for the group was Alappuzha.

Beyond its plantation arm all the major business verticals of the company is today based in Egmore, Chennai. Mr. Jeysingh Thomas became the chairman of A.V.Thomas group in 1968 after A.V.Thomas's death. Today the group is managed by Mr.Ajit Thomas (son of Jeysingh Thomas). The group is involved in diverse businesses, including tea, coffee, rubber, spices, leather goods, food ingredients and natural extracts, treated rubber wood, shipping and warehousing, plant biotechnology, investments, etc. In 1986, AVT Group started the first commercial plant tissue culture laboratory in India.
