= N. Soundarapandian =

Indian politician

Member of the Madras State Assembly
- In office 1962 - 1967; 1967 - 1972
- Constituency: Radhapuram

Personal details
- Political party: Indian National Congress

N. Soundrapandian was an India politician and two times Member of Legislative Assembly. He was elected to Tamil Nadu legislative assembly from Radhapuram constituency in 1962 and 1967 elections as an Indian National Congress candidate.
