= I. S. Inbadurai =

Indian politician

Member of Parliament, Rajya Sabha
- Incumbent
- Assumed office 25 July 2025
- Prime Minister: Narendra Modi
- Preceded by: Anbumani Ramadoss
- Constituency: Tamil Nadu

Member of the Tamil Nadu Legislative Assembly
- In office 23 May 2016 – 3 May 2021
- Chief Minister: J. Jayalalithaa; O. Panneerselvam; Edappadi K. Palaniswami
- Preceded by: S. Michael Rayappan
- Succeeded by: M. Appavu
- Constituency: Radhapuram

Personal details
- Born: 28 September 1965 (age 60) 7-28, South Street, Navaladi, Thisayanvilai, Tirunelveli, Tamil Nadu, India.
- Party: All India Anna Dravida Munnetra Kazhagam
- Occupation: Advocate

I. S. Inbadurai is an Indian politician and advocate. He is a member of Parliament, representing Tamil Nadu in the Rajya Sabha, the upper house of Parliament of India. He also served as member of the Tamil Nadu Legislative Assembly representing Radhapuram constituency from 23 May 2016 to 3 May 2021 as an All India Anna Dravida Munnetra Kazhagam candidate.

== Elections contested and positions held ==
=== Rajya Sabha elections ===
Elections	Constituency	Political party	Result
2025	Tamil Nadu	AIADMK	Won

=== Tamil Nadu Legislative Assembly elections ===
Elections	Assembly	Constituency	Political party	Result	Vote percentage	Opposition		
Elections	Assembly	Constituency	Political party	Result	Vote percentage	Candidate	Political party	Vote percentage
2016	15th	Radhapuram	AIADMK	Won	40.62%	M. Appavu	DMK	40.59%
2021	16th	Radhapuram	AIADMK	Lost	40.99%	M. Appavu	DMK	44.17%

=== Positions in Parliament of the Republic of India ===
Elections	Position	Elected constituency	Term in office		
Elections	Position	Elected constituency	Assumed office	Left office	Time in office
2025	Member of Parliament, Rajya Sabha	Tamil Nadu	25 July 2025	Incumbent	256 days

=== Positions in Tamil Nadu Legislative Assembly ===
Elections	Position	Elected constituency	Term in office		
Elections	Position	Elected constituency	Assumed office	Left office	Time in office
2016	Member of the Legislative Assembly	Radhapuram	23 May 2016	3 May 2021	4 years, 345 days
