= Y. S. M. Yusuf =

Indian politician

Y. S. M. Yusuf was an Indian politician and former Minister of Public Work Department, Irrigation department and Chairman of Wakf board of Tamil Nadu in Dr.M.G.R Cabinet.He was elected as Member of Member of the Legislative Assembly as an Anna Dravida Munnetra Kazhagam candidate from Radhapuram constituency in 1977 Tamil Nadu state assembly election. Later he was elected to the Tamil Nadu Member of Legislative council by Dr.M.G.Ramachandran on 1983.
