= Sathish Christopher =

Indian politician (born 1984)

K. Sathish Christopher (born 26 October 1984) is an Indian surgeon and politician from Tamil Nadu. He is a member of the Tamil Nadu Legislative Assembly from Radhapuram Assembly constituency in Tirunelveli district representing Tamilaga Vettri Kazhagam (TVK).

== Early life and education ==
Christopher is from Tirunelveli district, Tamil Nadu. He is a surgeon holding an MBBS degree and a DNB in General Surgery. He has prestigious fellowships from many bodies, including the American College of Surgeons (FACS) and the International College of Surgeons (FICS, USA). He also has been awarded a fellowship with the Royal Society for Public Health (FRSPH, UK) and the National Academy of Medical Sciences (MNAMS). He is a qualified robotic surgeon in Tamil Nadu.

== Career ==
Christopher won as an MLA for the first time winning the 2026 Tamil Nadu Legislative Assembly election from Radhapuram Assembly constituency representing TVK. He polled 69947 votes successfully defeating his nearest rival, and the ex speaker of TN assembly Mr. M. Appavu of the Dravida Munnetra Kazhagam, by a margin of 12313 votes.
