= Valanjanganam Falls =

- വളഞ്ഞാങ്കാനം വെളളച്ചാട്ടം Ninnumullippara
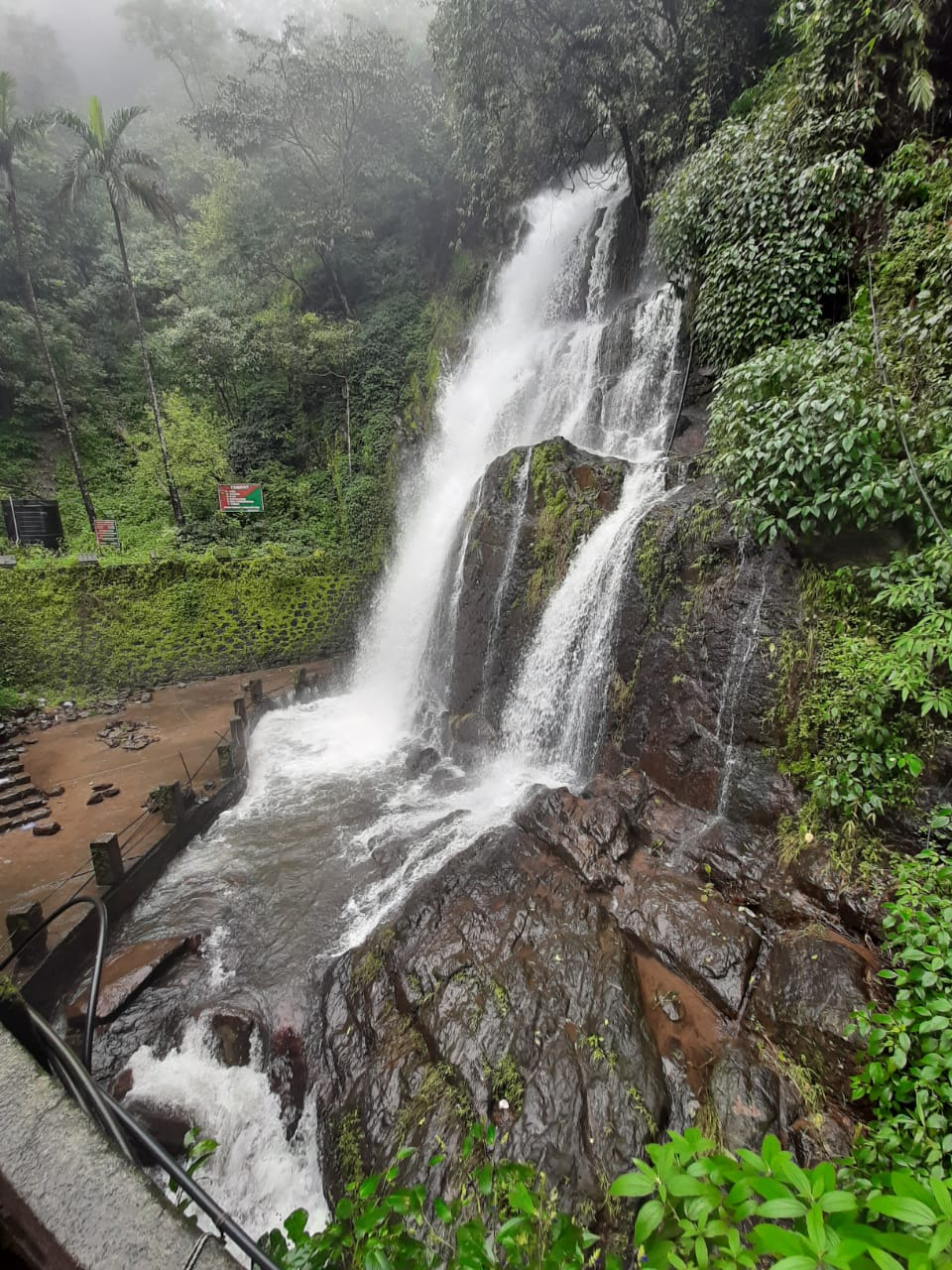

- Location within Kerala
- Location: Peermade, Idukki district, Kerala, India
- Coordinates: 9°33′46″N 76°58′39″E
- Type: Waterfall
- Elevation: 22.86
- Number of drops: 1

Valanjanganam Falls, locally known as Valanjanganam Vellachaattam or Ninnumullipara vellachattam is a scenic waterfall located in Peermade in Idukki district, Kerala state. It lies on the National Highway 183 (Kottayam-Kumily Road), about 1 km from Murinjapuzha and 5 km from Kuttikkanam. Tourists usually stop here for a tea and enjoy the falls. Its an ideal spot to stop and take a quick stretch and relax during tiring journeys.

== See also ==
- List of waterfalls
- List of waterfalls in India
- Kuttikkanam
- Peermade
