= Peer Mohammed Dargah =

Coordinates: 8°14′53.0″N 77°18′58.5″E

Peer Mohamed Oliyullah Dargha is the Dargah of Sufi philosopher, and Tamil poet Peer Mohamed Appa located 35 km from Thuckalay. It is one of the most renowned Sufi pilgrim centers in Kanyakumari, the southernmost district of Tamil Nadu.

Peer Mohamed was born in Tenkasi of Tirunelveli District. After spending his formative years of meditation in the Peermedu of Kerala State, Peer Mohamed chose to stay permanently in Thuckalay. He was renowned as a poet and philosopher, writing in Tamil. He had a very close relationship with the rulers of the Chera dynasty in Travancore.

The Anniversary of this Sufi philosopher and poet is celebrated every year in the Arabic month of Rajab. This event is being conducted by Thuckalai APMA Jamaath. People from various parts of Kerala and Tamil Nadu visit the Dargha irrespective of their religion during this month. The festival day is declared as a local holiday by the state government for the whole district of Kanyakumari.

The vow of sleeping in the Dargah premises is considered sacred.
