= V. Karthesan =

Indian politician

V. Karthesan was an Indian politician and former Member of the Legislative Assembly. He was elected to the Tamil Nadu Legislative Assembly as a Dravida Munnetra Kazhagam candidate from the Radhapuram constituency in the 1971 election.
