= Radhapuram Assembly constituency =

One of the 234 State Legislative Assembly Constituencies in Tamil Nadu, in India

Coordinates: 8°16′03″N 77°40′38″E

Radhapuram
- Constituency No. 228 for the Tamil Nadu Legislative Assembly

Constituency details
- Country: India
- Region: South India
- State: Tamil Nadu
- District: Tirunelveli
- Lok Sabha constituency: Tirunelveli
- Established: 1957
- Total electors: 247,061

Member of Legislative Assembly
- 17th Tamil Nadu Legislative Assembly
- Incumbent Dr. Sathish Christopher
- Party: TVK
- Elected year: 2026

Radhapuram is a legislative assembly constituency in the Tirunelveli district in the Indian state of Tamil Nadu. The constituency has been in existence since the 1957 election. It is one of the 234 State Legislative Assembly Constituencies in Tamil Nadu in India.

== Members of Legislative Assembly ==
Year	Member	Political party
Madras State
1957	A. V. Thomas	Indian National Congress
1962	N. Soundarapandian	Indian National Congress
1967	N. Soundarapandian	Indian National Congress
Tamil Nadu
1971	V. Karthesan	Dravida Munnetra Kazhagam
1977	Y. S. M. Yusuf	All India Anna Dravida Munnetra Kazhagam
1980	E. Muthuramalingam	Gandhi Kamaraj National Congress
1984	Kumari Ananthan	Gandhi Kamaraj National Congress
1989	Ramani Nallathambi	Indian National Congress
1991	Ramani Nallathambi	Indian National Congress
1996	M. Appavu	Tamil Maanila Congress (Moopanar)
2001	M. Appavu	Independent
2006	M. Appavu	Dravida Munnetra Kazhagam
2011	S. Michael Rayappan	Desiya Murpokku Dravida Kazhagam
2016	I. S. Inbadurai	All India Anna Dravida Munnetra Kazhagam
2021	M. Appavu	Dravida Munnetra Kazhagam
2026	Sathish Christopher	Tamilaga Vettri Kazhagam

== Election results ==
Vote share of winning candidates
2026	34.99%
2021	43.95%
2016	40.62%
2011	48.36%
2006	43.36%
2001	45.40%
1996	46.60%
1991	62.83%
1989	32.19%
1984	53.99%
1980	53.95%
1977	38.68%
1971	51.68%
1967	50.44%
1962	67.04%
1957	58.78%

=== 2026 ===
2026 Tamil Nadu Legislative Assembly election: Radhapuram
Party	Candidate	Votes	%	±%
TVK	Dr. Sathish Christopher	69,947	34.99	New
DMK	Appavu. M	57,634	28.83	▼15.34
BJP	Balakrishnan. S.P	52,637	26.33	New
Independent	Daniel. A	819	0.41	New
Independent	Pon Santhana Kumaran. R	482	0.24	New
NOTA	NOTA	469	0.23	
BSP	Essakkiammal. E	331	0.17	New
Independent	Selvan. T	285	0.14	New
Independent	Karthick. V	232	0.12	New
Independent	Manikandan. L	223	0.11	New
Independent	Manikandan. S	205	0.10	New
Independent	Anand Prasad	195	0.10	New
Independent	Manikandan. A.I	164	0.08	New
Naam Indiar Party	Jesurajendran. J	163	0.08	New
Margin of victory		12,313	6.16	▲2.98
Turnout		1,99,156	80.53	▲11.68
Registered electors		2,47,310		▼23,450
TVK gain from DMK		Swing	▲34.99	

=== 2021 ===
2021 Tamil Nadu Legislative Assembly election: Radhapuram
Party	Candidate	Votes	%	±%
DMK	M. Appavu	82,331	44.17	+3.58
AIADMK	I. S. Inbadurai	76,406	40.99	+0.37
DMDK	K. Jeyabalan	2,432	1.30	−3.58
Independent	G. Deva Peran	1,224	0.66	New
Margin of victory		5,925	3.18	3.15
Turnout		186,407	68.85	−2.52
Rejected ballots		341	0.18	
Registered electors		270,760		
DMK gain from AIADMK		Swing	3.55	

=== 2016 ===
2016 Tamil Nadu Legislative Assembly election: Radhapuram
Party	Candidate	Votes	%	±%
AIADMK	I. S. Inbadurai	69,590	40.62	New
DMK	M. Appavu	69,541	40.59	New
BJP	S. Kani Amudha	11,131	6.50	+2.67
DMDK	S. Sivananaintha Perumal	8,362	4.88	−43.48
Independent	S. P. Udayakumar	4,891	2.85	New
NOTA	NOTA	1,821	1.06	New
Margin of victory		49	0.03	−15.46
Turnout		171,337	71.37	0.28
Registered electors		240,072		
AIADMK gain from DMDK		Swing	-7.74	

=== 2011 ===
2011 Tamil Nadu Legislative Assembly election: Radhapuram
Party	Candidate	Votes	%	±%
DMDK	S. Michael Rayappan	67,072	48.36	+42.72
INC	P. Veldurai	45,597	32.88	New
JMM	N. Nallakannu	6,336	4.57	New
Independent	M. Vijaya Kumar	6,154	4.44	New
BJP	R. Shanthi Ragavan	5,305	3.82	−0.88
Independent	Jesupani Vazhan	2,716	1.96	New
Independent	D. Iniyan John @ John Felix	1,020	0.74	New
IJK	S. Kingsly Isacc Jebaraj	733	0.53	New
Margin of victory		21,475	15.48	6.07
Turnout		138,694	71.09	5.67
Registered electors		195,099		
DMDK gain from DMK		Swing	5.00	

=== 2006 ===
2006 Tamil Nadu Legislative Assembly election: Radhapuram
Party	Candidate	Votes	%	±%
DMK	M. Appavu	49,249	43.36	+21.38
AIADMK	L. Gnanapunitha	38,552	33.94	New
Independent	K. P. K. Selvaraj	9,017	7.94	New
DMDK	S. Sivanaintha Perumal	6,404	5.64	New
BJP	Thamizhisai	5,343	4.70	New
AIFB	A. Parvathi	1,059	0.93	New
Independent	A. Selvaraj	1,051	0.93	New
Independent	S. Thanam	994	0.88	New
Margin of victory		10,697	9.42	−9.18
Turnout		113,584	65.42	11.13
Registered electors		173,633		
DMK gain from Independent		Swing	-2.04	

=== 2001 ===
2001 Tamil Nadu Legislative Assembly election: Radhapuram
Party	Candidate	Votes	%	±%
Independent	M. Appavu	44,619	45.40	New
PMK	S. Jothi	26,338	26.80	New
DMK	T. Venus Veera Arasu	21,600	21.98	New
MDMK	N. Sargunaraj	2,055	2.09	−9.04
Independent	T. Jothi	1,463	1.49	New
Independent	M. Arumugam	922	0.94	New
Independent	K. Appavu	876	0.89	New
Margin of victory		18,281	18.60	−10.85
Turnout		98,284	54.29	−7.19
Registered electors		181,038		
Independent gain from TMC(M)		Swing	-1.21	

=== 1996 ===
1996 Tamil Nadu Legislative Assembly election: Radhapuram
Party	Candidate	Votes	%	±%
TMC(M)	M. Appavu	45,808	46.60	New
INC	S. K. Chandrasekaran	16,862	17.15	−45.67
BJP	R. Ponnuvel	13,265	13.50	+2.31
MDMK	M. Raymond	10,937	11.13	New
Independent	S. Balraj	9,460	9.62	New
AIIC(T)	Nallathamby	909	0.92	New
Margin of victory		28,946	29.45	−10.61
Turnout		98,294	61.48	7.71
Registered electors		167,737		
TMC(M) gain from INC		Swing	-16.22	

=== 1991 ===
1991 Tamil Nadu Legislative Assembly election: Radhapuram
Party	Candidate	Votes	%	±%
INC	Ramani Nallathambi	51,331	62.83	+30.63
DMK	N. Sargunaraj	18,600	22.77	−4.5
BJP	S. Jeyaraj	9,136	11.18	+6.73
AAP	S. Thangavel	1,738	2.13	New
JP	T. Masanamuthu	472	0.58	New
Margin of victory		32,731	40.06	35.14
Turnout		81,704	53.77	−11.08
Registered electors		159,398		
INC hold		Swing	30.63	

=== 1989 ===
1989 Tamil Nadu Legislative Assembly election: Radhapuram
Party	Candidate	Votes	%	±%
INC	Ramani Nallathambi	29,432	32.19	New
DMK	V. Karthesan	24,930	27.27	New
Independent	N. Sountmara Pandian	23,995	26.25	New
AIADMK	D. Thangaraj	7,980	8.73	New
BJP	S. Jeyaraj	4,068	4.45	New
Margin of victory		4,502	4.92	−15.40
Turnout		91,424	64.85	−0.13
Registered electors		143,444		
INC gain from GKC		Swing	-21.80	

=== 1984 ===
1984 Tamil Nadu Legislative Assembly election: Radhapuram
Party	Candidate	Votes	%	±%
GKC	Kumari Ananthan	40,213	53.99	New
Independent	B. Subramania Nadar	25,075	33.66	New
Independent	S. K. John Devaerakkam	5,987	8.04	New
Independent	S. Lazer	735	0.99	New
Independent	C. Saravana Perumal	700	0.94	New
Independent	T. Ramasamy	660	0.89	New
Independent	S. Lakshmana Thevar	561	0.75	New
Margin of victory		15,138	20.32	10.91
Turnout		74,484	64.98	3.95
Registered electors		124,210		
GKC hold		Swing	0.04	

=== 1980 ===
1980 Tamil Nadu Legislative Assembly election: Radhapuram
Party	Candidate	Votes	%	±%
GKC	E. Muthuramalingam	38,044	53.95	New
DMK	Nellai Nedumaran	31,408	44.54	+26.92
Independent	A. Kirupanithi	480	0.68	New
Margin of victory		6,636	9.41	4.15
Turnout		70,519	61.03	3.35
Registered electors		116,959		
GKC gain from AIADMK		Swing	15.27	

=== 1977 ===
1977 Tamil Nadu Legislative Assembly election: Radhapuram
Party	Candidate	Votes	%	±%
AIADMK	Y. S. M. Yusuf	26,404	38.68	New
JP	P. Paul Pandian	22,810	33.41	New
DMK	I. Rayer	12,028	17.62	−34.06
INC	T. Martin	6,524	9.56	−38.76
Margin of victory		3,594	5.26	1.91
Turnout		68,265	57.69	−14.19
Registered electors		119,868		
AIADMK gain from DMK		Swing	-13.00	

=== 1971 ===
1971 Tamil Nadu Legislative Assembly election: Radhapuram
Party	Candidate	Votes	%	±%
DMK	V. Karthesan	33,678	51.68	+2.12
INC	K. P. Karuthiah	31,489	48.32	−2.12
Margin of victory		2,189	3.36	2.48
Turnout		65,167	71.88	−0.48
Registered electors		95,720		
DMK gain from INC		Swing	1.24	

=== 1967 ===
1967 Madras Legislative Assembly election: Radhapuram
Party	Candidate	Votes	%	±%
INC	N. Soundarapandian	31,588	50.44	−16.6
DMK	V. Karthesan	31,040	49.56	New
Margin of victory		548	0.88	−35.65
Turnout		62,628	72.36	3.72
Registered electors		88,803		
INC hold		Swing	-16.60	

=== 1962 ===
1962 Madras Legislative Assembly election: Radhapuram
Party	Candidate	Votes	%	±%
INC	N. Soundarapandian	42,334	67.04	+8.26
SWA	P. R. Carmel	19,271	30.52	New
Independent	N. Arul Doss Thillaipazham	1,189	1.88	New
Independent	K. S. Perumal Mudaliar	356	0.56	New
Margin of victory		23,063	36.52	8.94
Turnout		63,150	68.64	22.80
Registered electors		94,640		
INC hold		Swing	8.26	

=== 1957 ===
1957 Madras Legislative Assembly election: Radhapuram
Party	Candidate	Votes	%	±%
INC	A. V. Thomas	24,953	58.78	New
Independent	V. Karthesan	13,244	31.20	New
Independent	M. Gnanamuthu	2,389	5.63	New
Independent	Abraham Nadar	1,867	4.40	New
Margin of victory		11,709	27.58	
Turnout		42,453	45.84	
Registered electors		92,611		
INC win (new seat)				
