= Parunthumpara =

Parunthumpara പരുന്തുംപാറ
- village
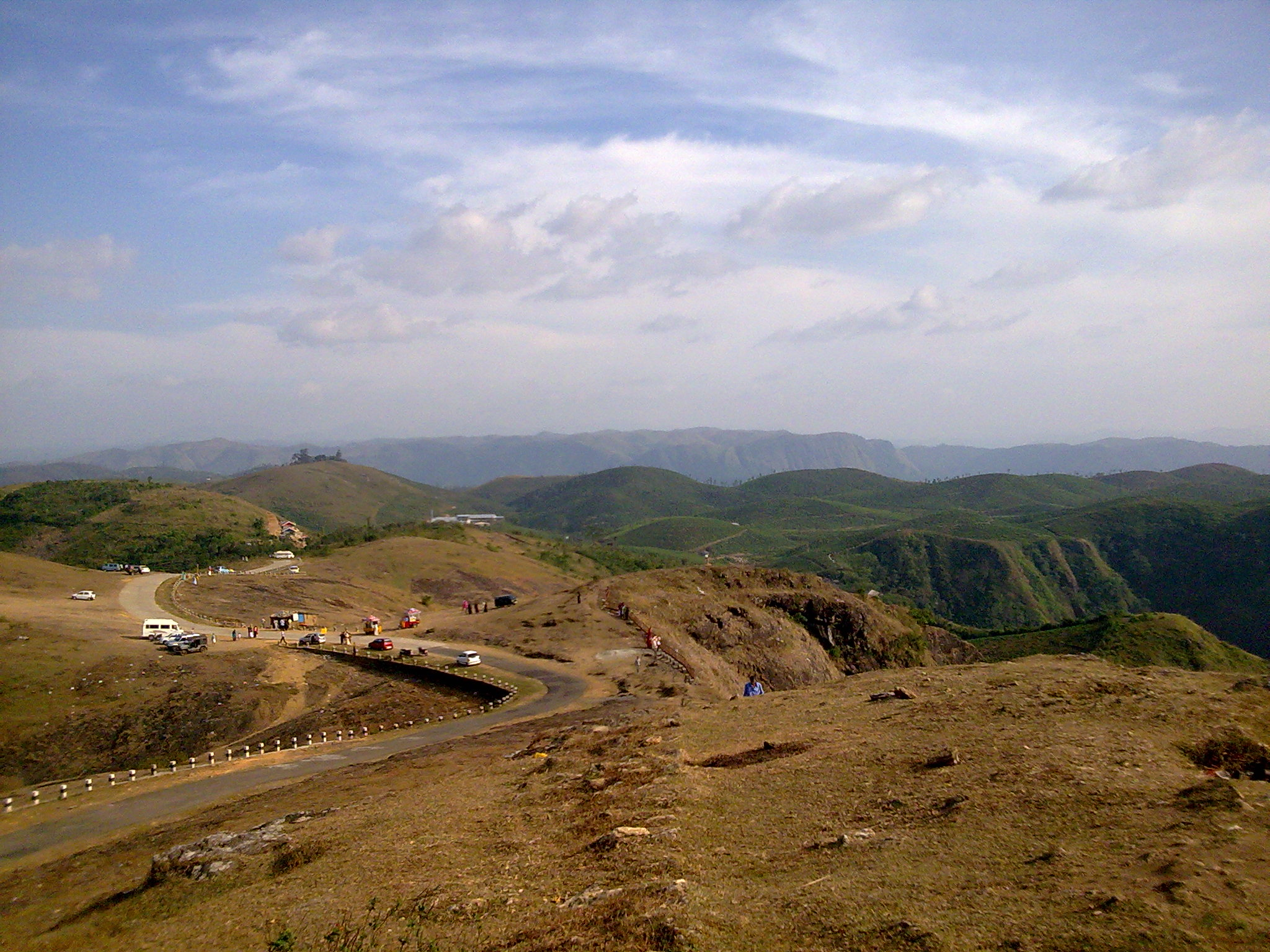
- Viewpoint in Parunthumpara. The right side is a cliff.

- Location in Kerala, India
- Coordinates: 9.548°N 77.033°E
- Country: India
- State: Kerala
- District: Idukki

Government
  - Type: Panchayath

Languages
  - Official: Malayalam, English
- Time zone: UTC+5:30 (IST)
- Vehicle registration: KL-37
- Nearest city: Peermade

Parunthumpara is a village in the Indian state of Kerala's Idukki District. It is a small scenic location near Wagamon en route to Peerumedu. Parunthumpara is located 6 km from Peermade and 25 km from Thekkady.

From here, the Makarajyothi of Sabarimala is visible. The main attractions of Parunthumpara are Suicide Point and Tagor Head (a rock that appears to have the shape of Tagor, an Indian poet's, head).

The District Tourism Promotion Council plans to develop Parunthumpara as a hill station and as a stopover place for tourists who travel from Kumarakom to Thekkady. There are two main roads through which the domestic and international tourists reach the district — from Nedumbassery to Munnar and from Kumarakom to Thekkady. A project has been submitted to the government for constructing a protective wall and for allotting a parking area so as to prevent the entry of vehicles on the grasslands.

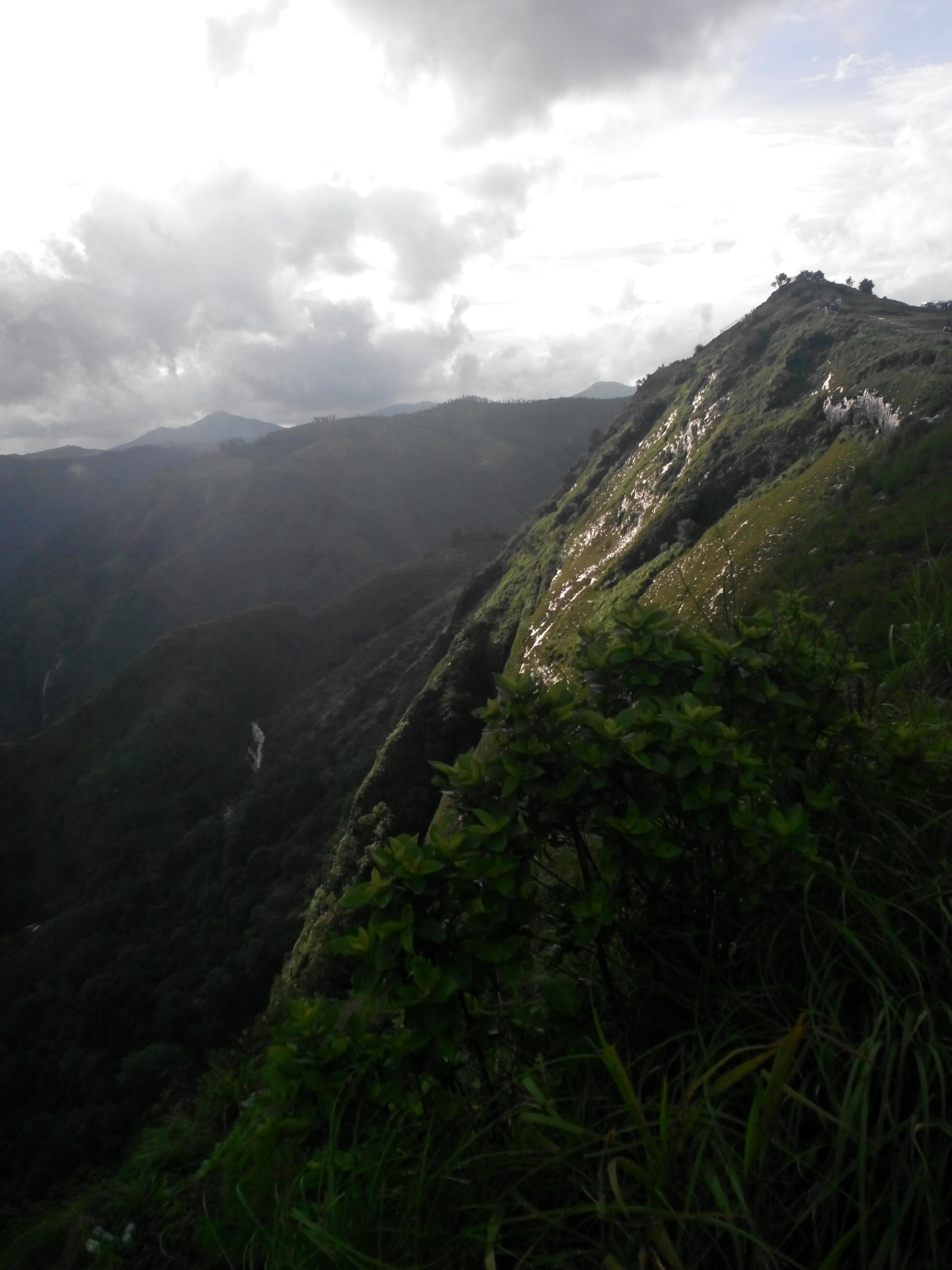
The cliff of Parunthumpara.

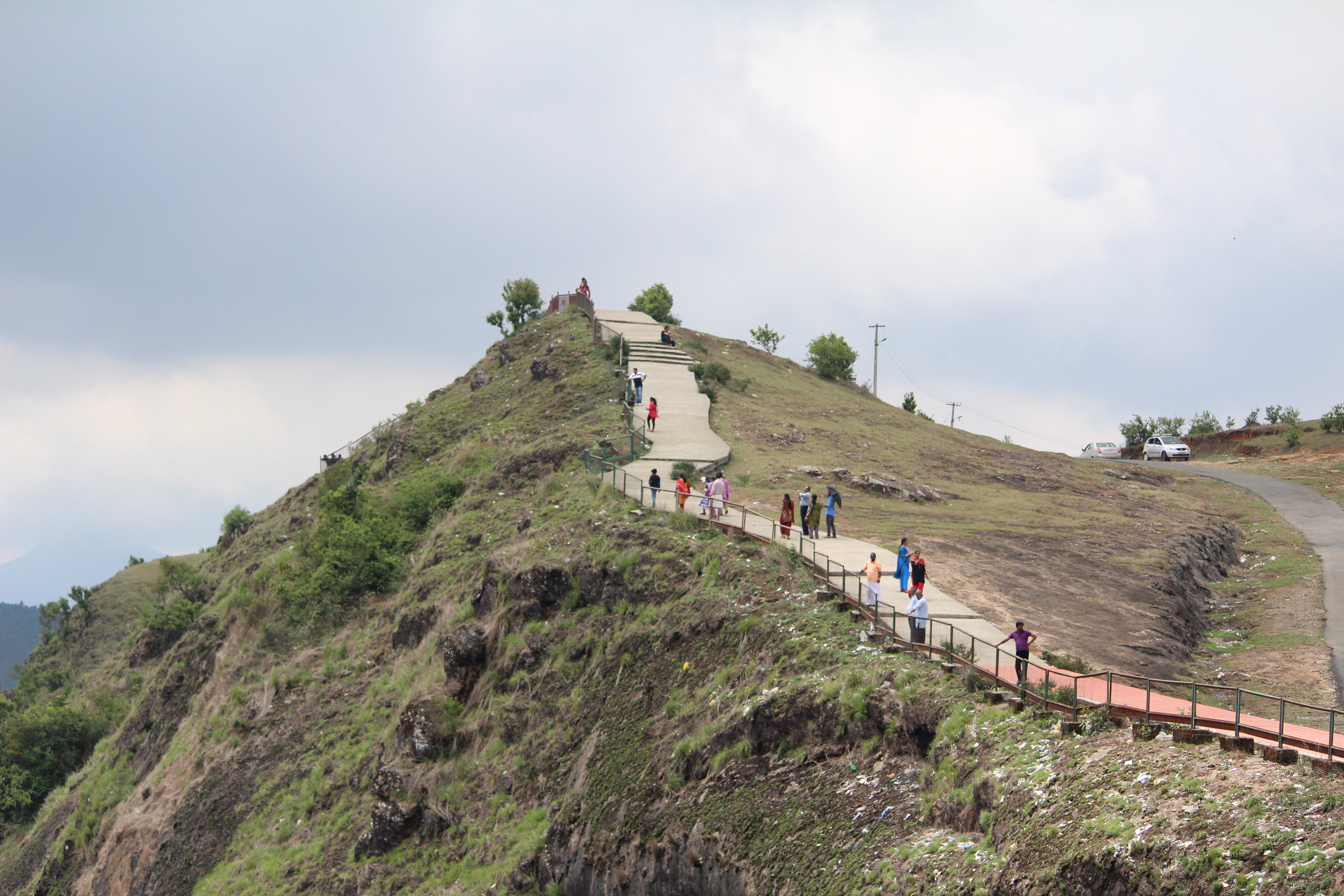
Visitors

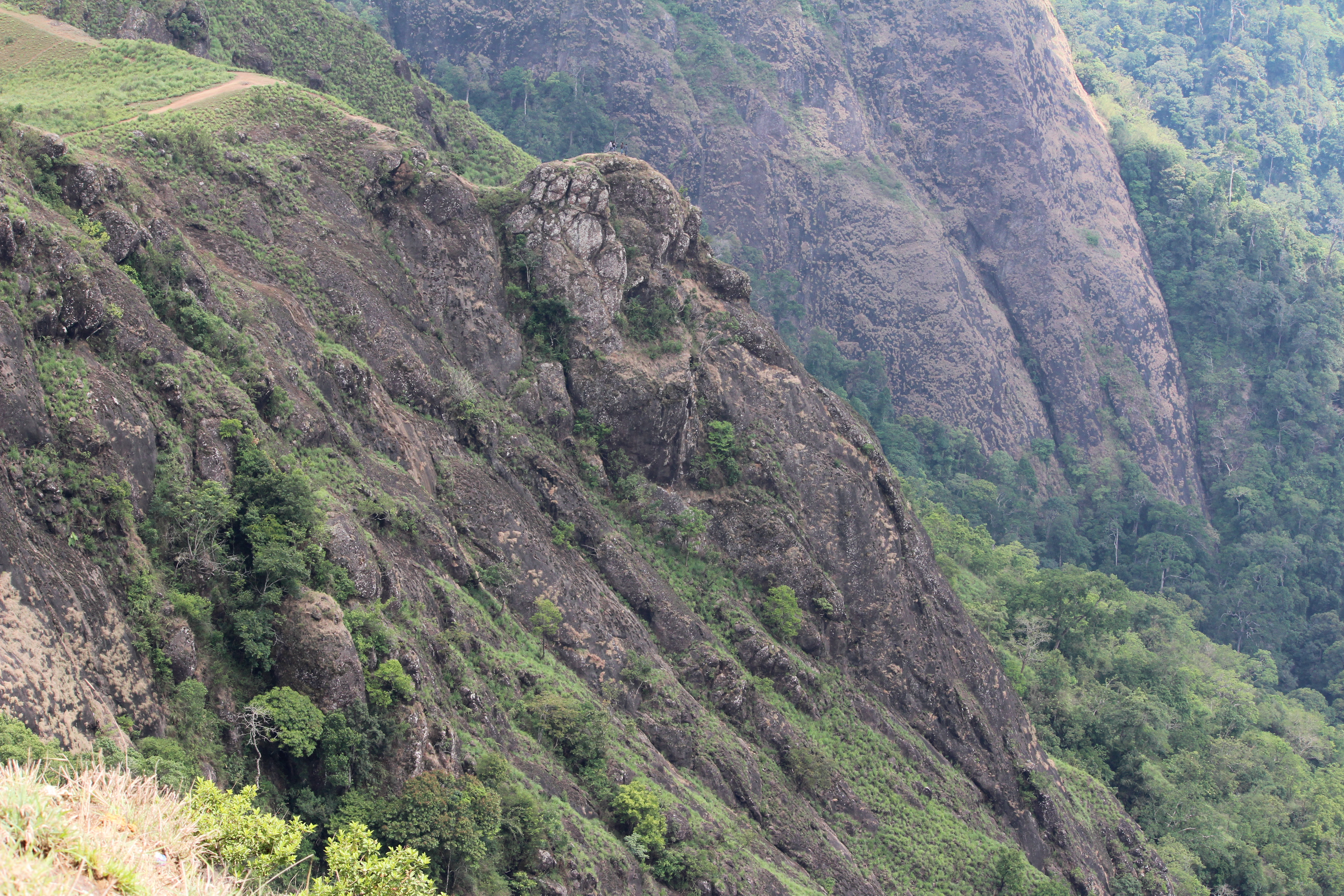
Tagore head at Parunthumpara

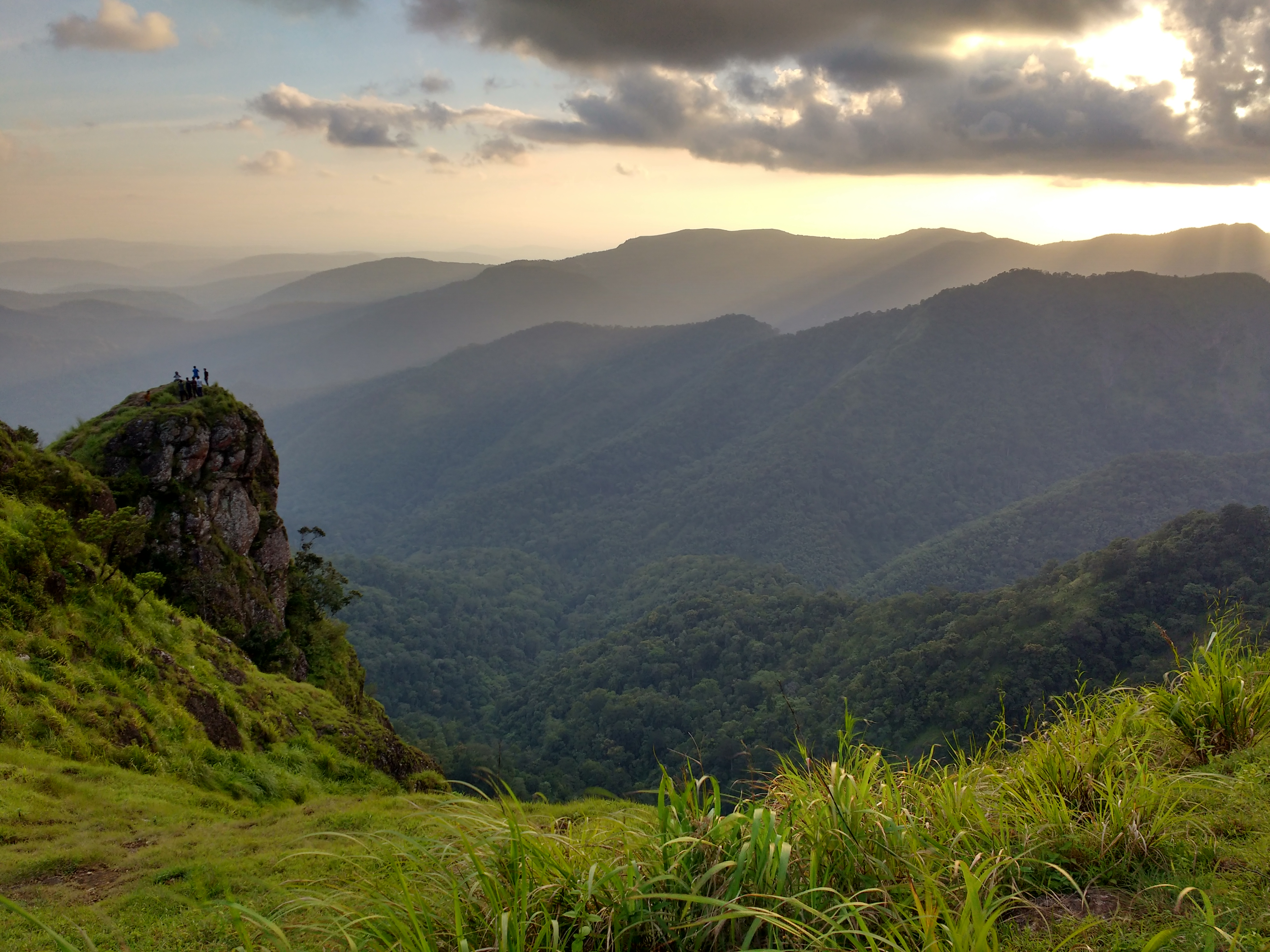
A view from Parunthumpara
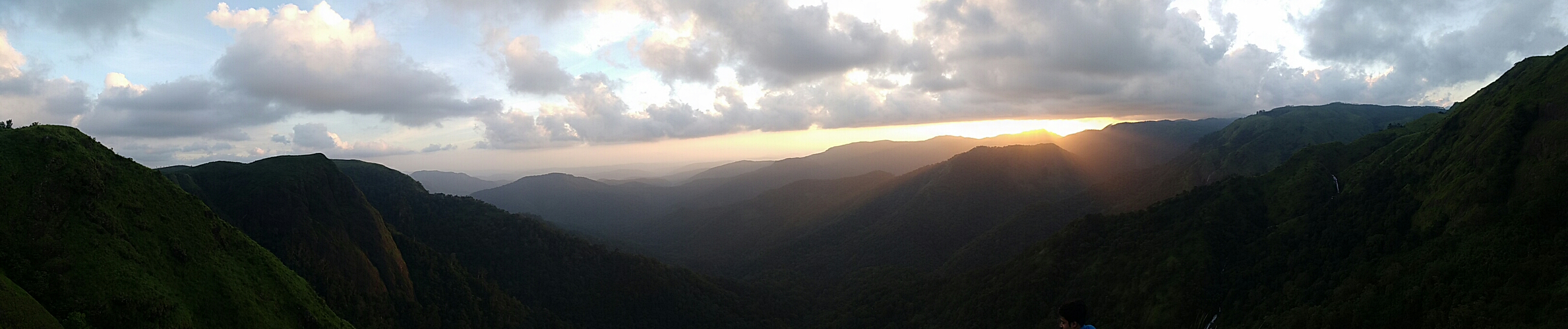
A panorama view from Parunthumpara

Sabarimala pilgrims visit the area to witness makarajyothi, making it a busy place during the pilgrimage season.
