= Ramani Nallathambi =

Indian politician

Ramani Nallathambi is an Indian politician and former Member of the Legislative Assembly. She was elected to the Tamil Nadu legislative assembly as an Indian National Congress candidate from Radhapuram constituency in 1989 and 1991 elections.
