= Peermade =

- Hill station
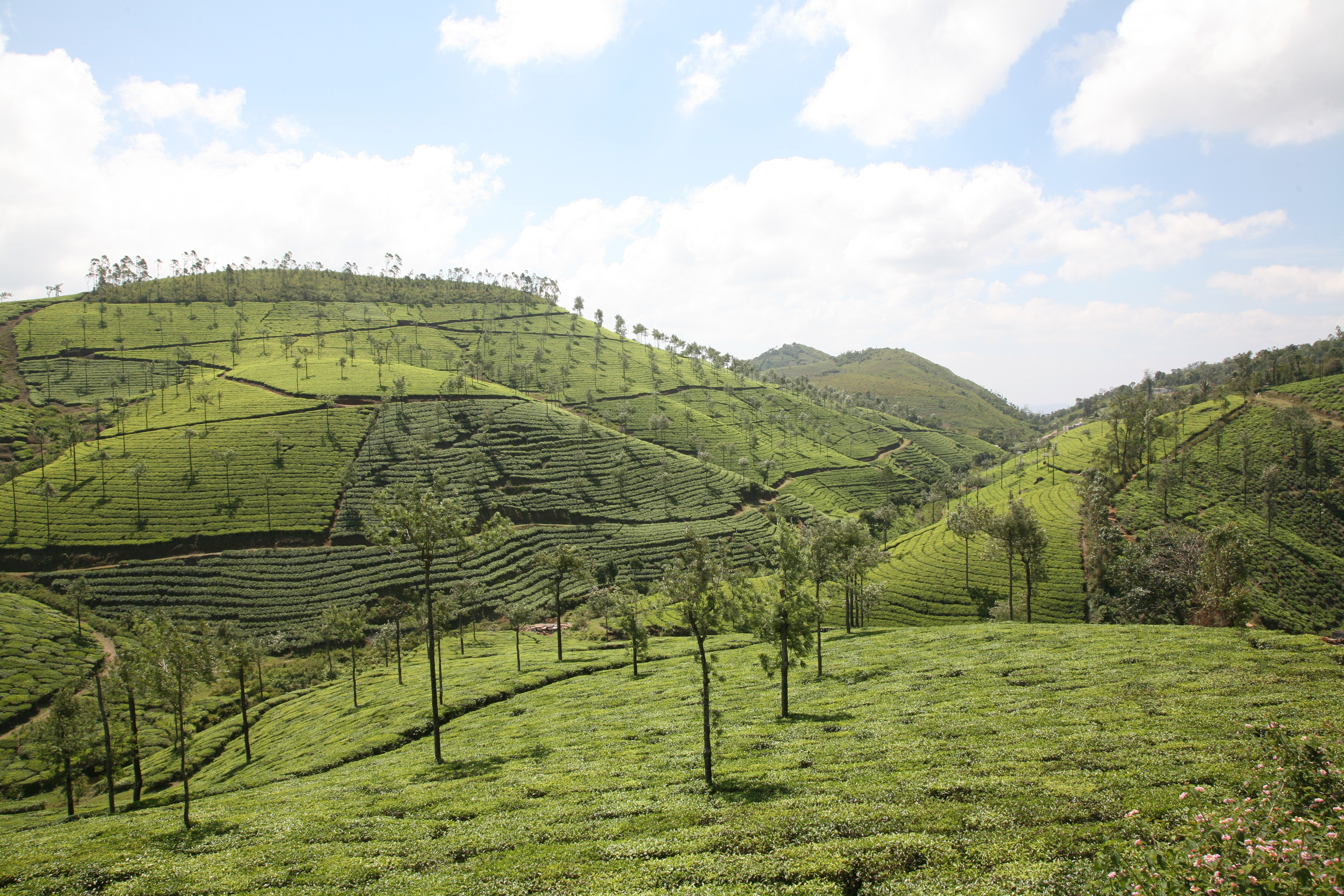
- Tea plantation near Pambanar community. Taken from National Highway 183.

- Location in Kerala, India Peermade (India)
- Coordinates: 9°34′40″N 77°1′15″E
- Country: India
- State: Kerala
- District: Idukki

Government
  - Type: Panchayati raj (India)
  - Body: Peermade Grama Panchayat

Area
  - Total: 52.34 km^{2} (20.21 sq mi)

Population (2011)
  - Total: 22,213
  - Density: 424.4/km^{2} (1,099/sq mi)

Languages
  - Official: Malayalam, English
  - Regional: Malayalam, Tamil
- Time zone: UTC+5:30 (IST)
- PIN: 685531
- Area code: 04869
- Vehicle registration: KL-37

Peermade, also spelt Peerumedu is a village, Grama Panchayat and hill station in the state of Kerala, in southwestern India. It lies 915 metres (3,002 ft) above sea level in the Western Ghats (Sahyadri) about 85 kilometres (53 mi) east of Kottayam on the way to Kumily.

== Etymology ==
The name is sometimes related to the Sufi saint, 'Peer Mohammed', as "hill of the Peer" (പീരുമേട്).The name Peerumedu is traditionally associated with Pir Muhammed Waliullah, a Siddha and Sufi saint from Tamil Nadu who is said to have meditated in the hills for an extended period. He is also known as Peeru Muhammad Sahib and is regarded as a spiritual teacher and Sufi poet, sometimes referred to as the "Rumi of South India". His resting place is at Takkala in Kanyakumari district. Both Takkala and Peerumedu are considered pilgrimage sites associated with him.

Another local tradition attributes the name "Peerumedu" to the large number of guava trees (pera) that once grew in the area. According to this account, the place was originally called "Peramedu", which later evolved into the present name Peerumedu.

== Demographics ==
Languages of Peermade taluk (2011)
1. Malayalam (65.3%)
2. Tamil (34.3%)
3. Others (0.31%)

As of the 2011 Census of India, Peerumade had a population of 22,213, comprising 11,049 males and 11,164 females. The village covers an area of 52.34 km² (20.21 sq mi) and contains 5,617 households. The sex ratio was 1,010 females per 1,000 males, which was lower than the state average of 1,084. In Peerumade, 8.8% of the population was under 6 years of age. Peerumade had an average literacy of 89.1% lower than the state average of 94%; male literacy was 93.9% and female literacy was 84.5%.

== Geography ==
The landscape of Peermade includes spectacular waterfalls, open grass lands and pine forests.The area is classified as Malanad (hill country), with elevations ranging from about 3,000 ft (910 m) above mean sea level.

== History ==
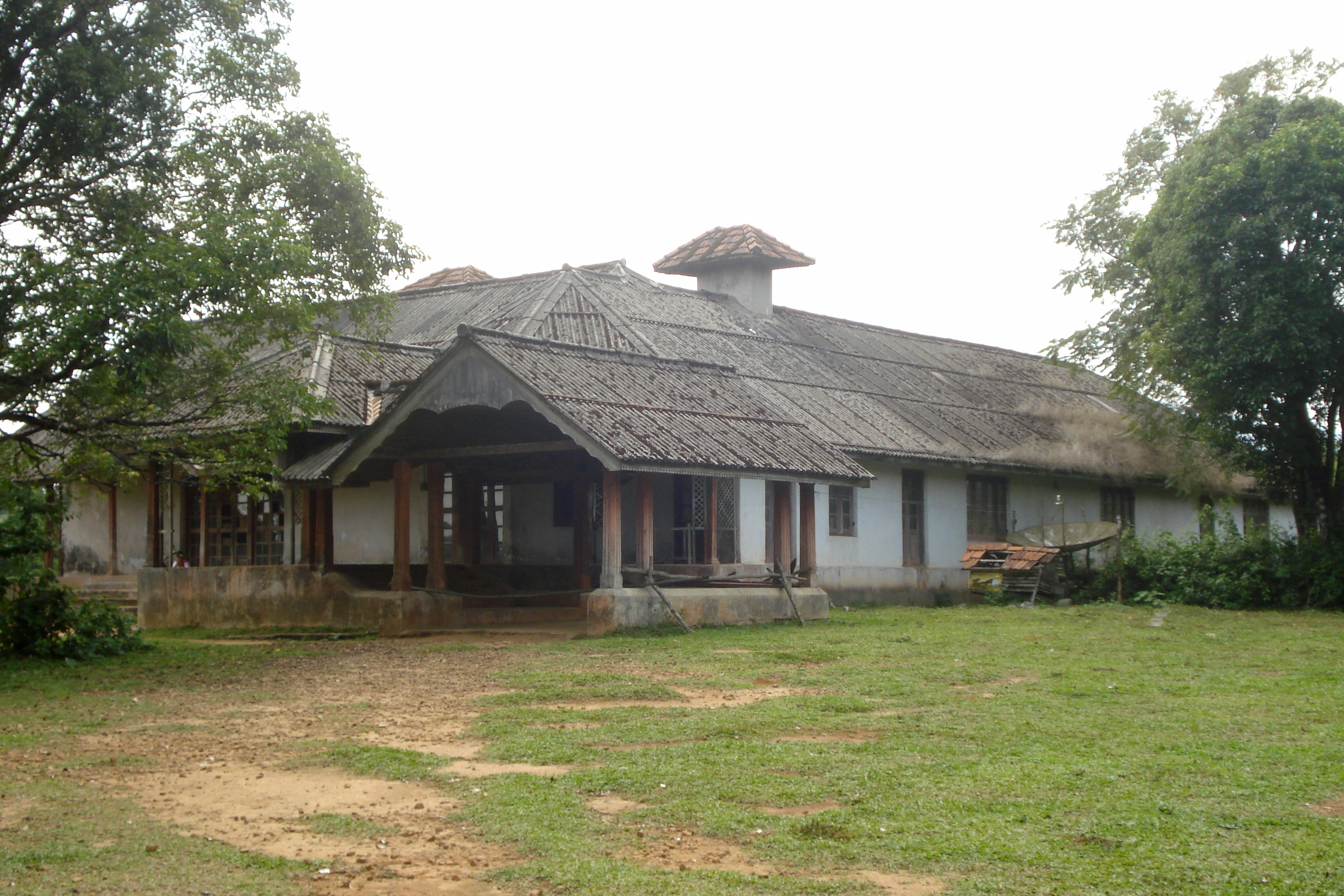
Ammachi Kottaram

Peermade (Peerumedu) was formerly used as a summer retreat by the Maharajas of Travancore. In earlier periods the region was largely inaccessible, covered by dense forests, and inhabited by tribal communities such as the Malappandarams and Malayarans. Archaeological findings indicate that a Neolithic culture once existed in the high ranges of the region, although it left no written records. Cultural remains discovered in the hill tracts near Kumily and Vandiperiyar provide evidence of early human activity in the area.

Peermade (Peerumedu) occupied the highest elevation on the mountain route that once linked the Kingdom of Travancore with Madurai in ancient Tamilakam. The Western Ghats formed a natural barrier separating the two regions. The Periyar Wildlife Sanctuary, one of the larger wildlife reserves in India, is located about 43 km (27 mi) away. The sanctuary is known for its populations of elephants and other wildlife, as well as its lakes.

== Spices ==
The area is extremely fertile and until recently featured lush plantations of coffee, tea, cardamon, and coconut. With a long history of spice growing, the focus is now on the production of organic black pepper, white pepper, ginger and turmeric.

At a 2006 show, spice growers from Peermade displayed samples of organically grown spices including cardamom, black pepper, white pepper, nutmeg, mace, cloves, turmeric, ginger, vanilla beans, vanilla powder and herbs such as oregano, sage, thyme and rosemary. Oils of thyme and rosemary were also displayed.

== Education ==
Marian College and Mar Baselios Christian College of Engineering and Technology are located at Kuttikanam in Peermade.

== Politics ==
Peermade assembly constituency is part of Idukki (Lok Sabha constituency). Cyriac Thomas is the current MLA of peermade.

== Gallery ==
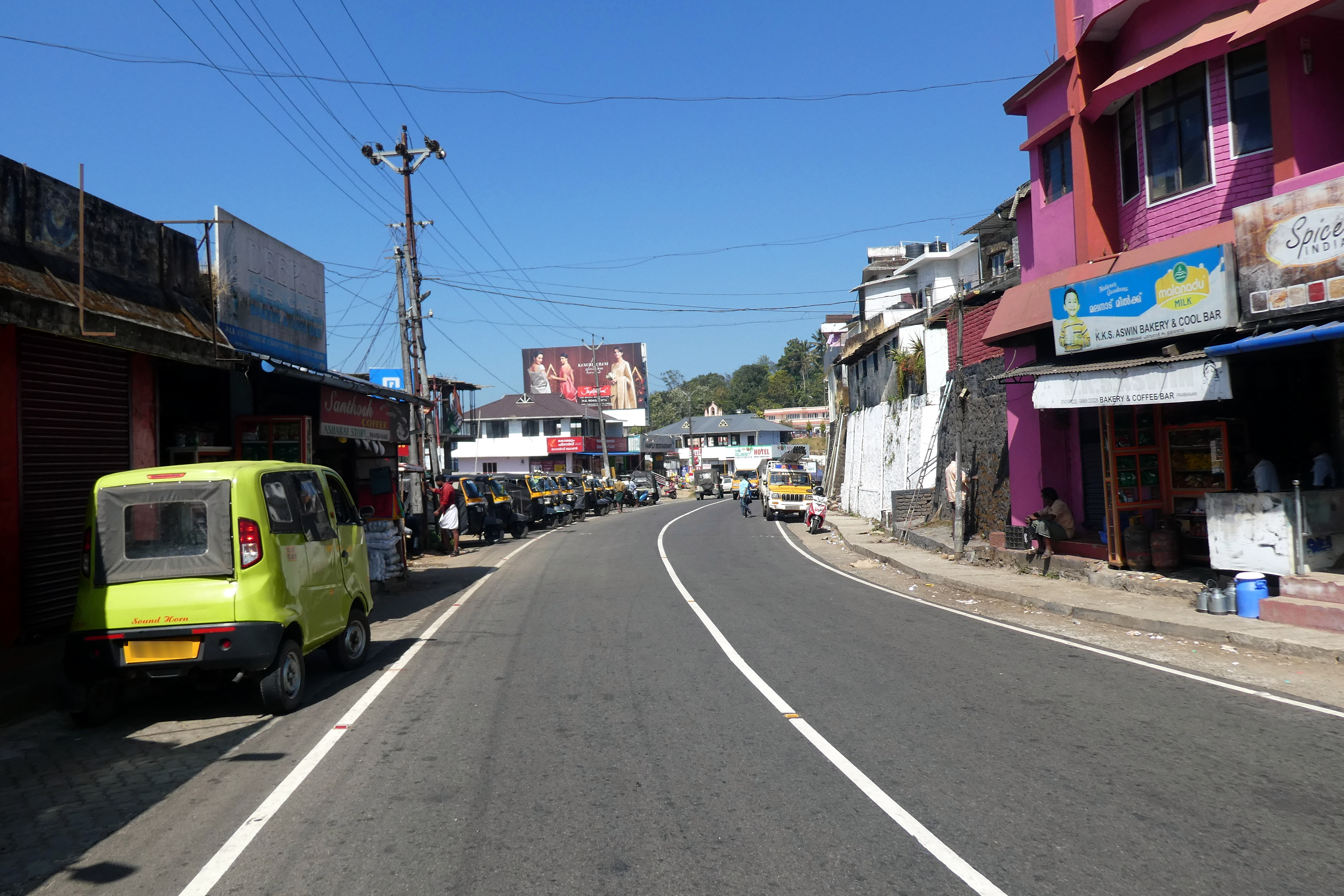
National Highway 183 through Pambanar community

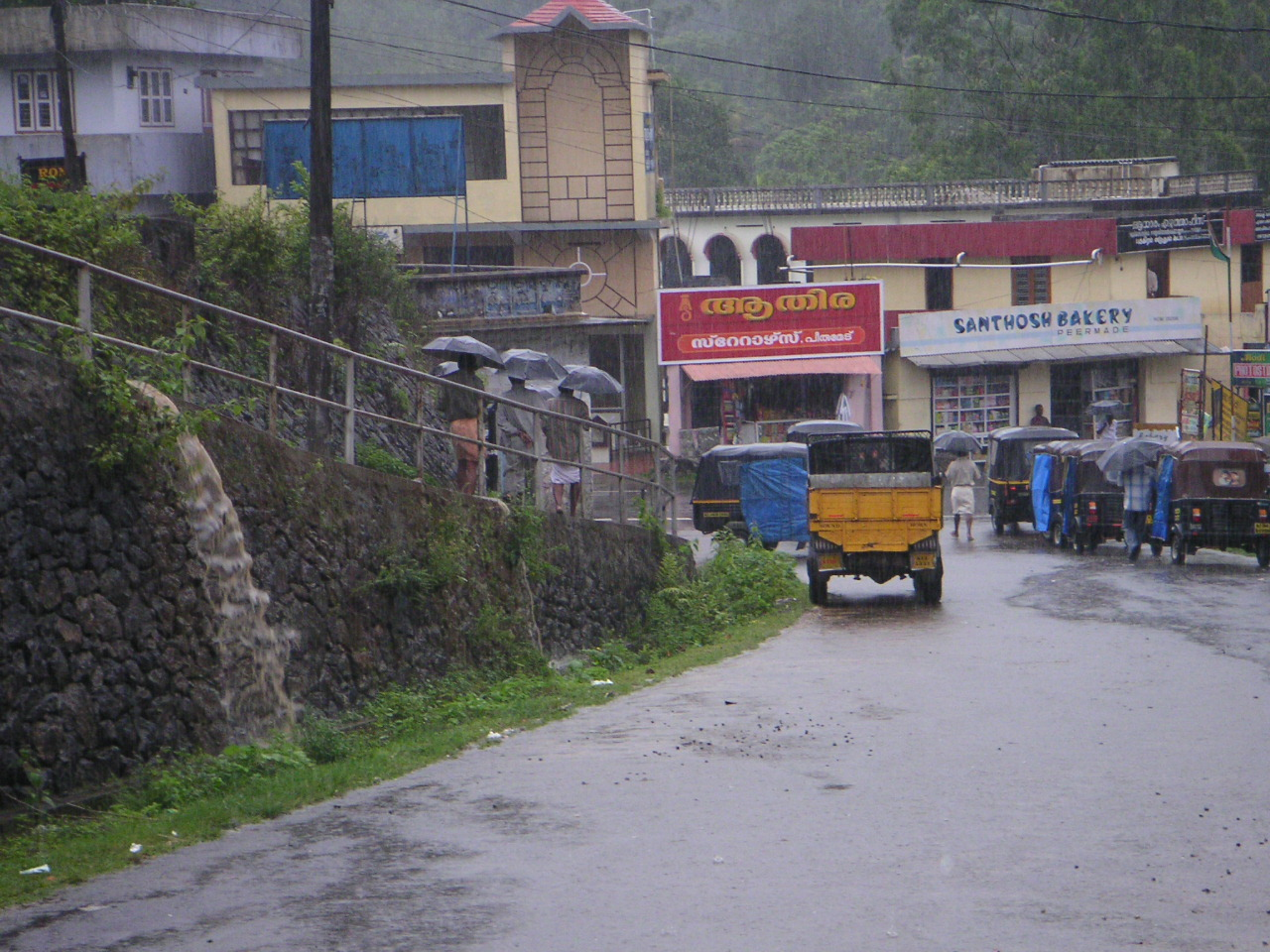
Azhutha community

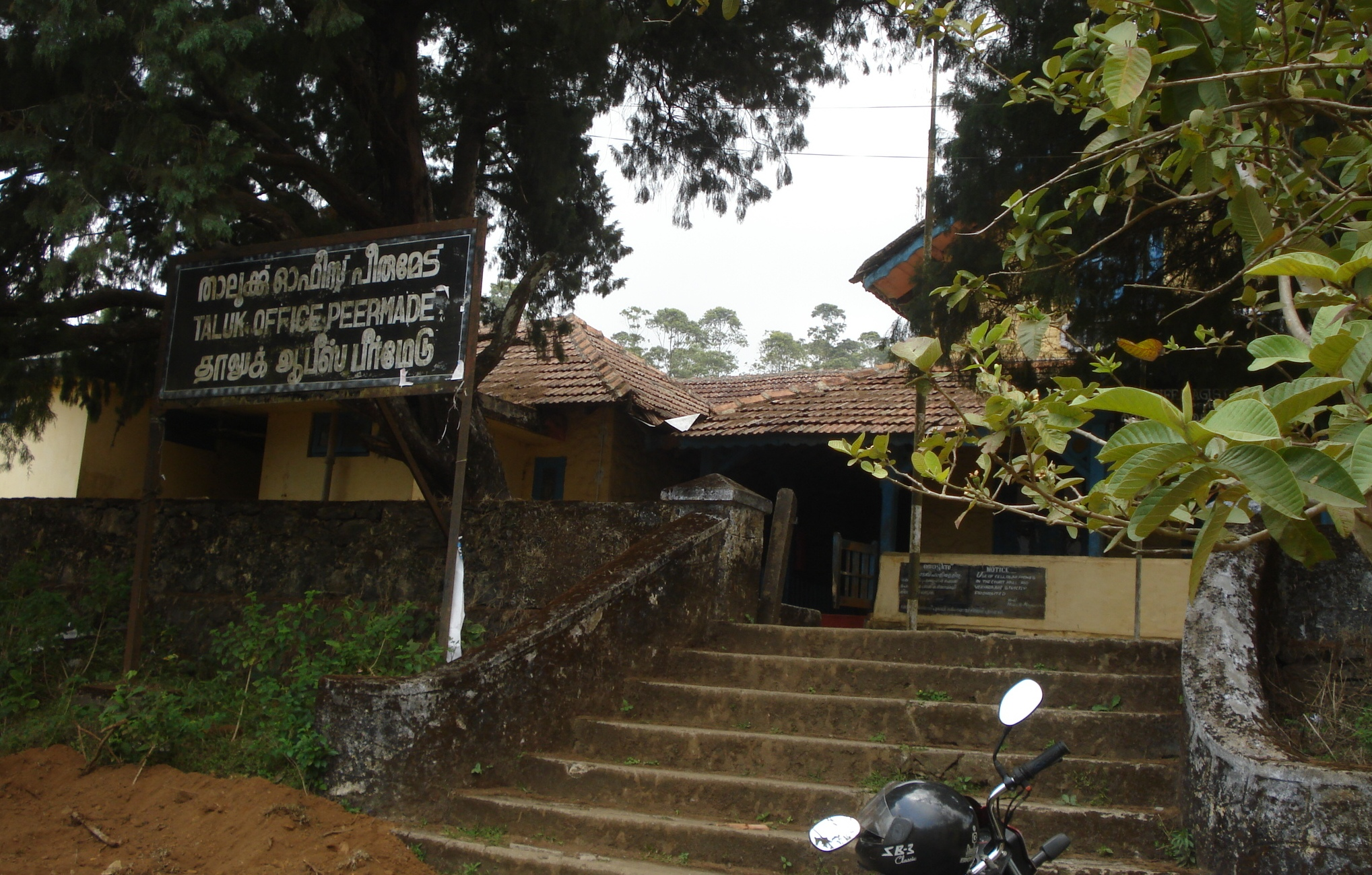
Tehsil Office

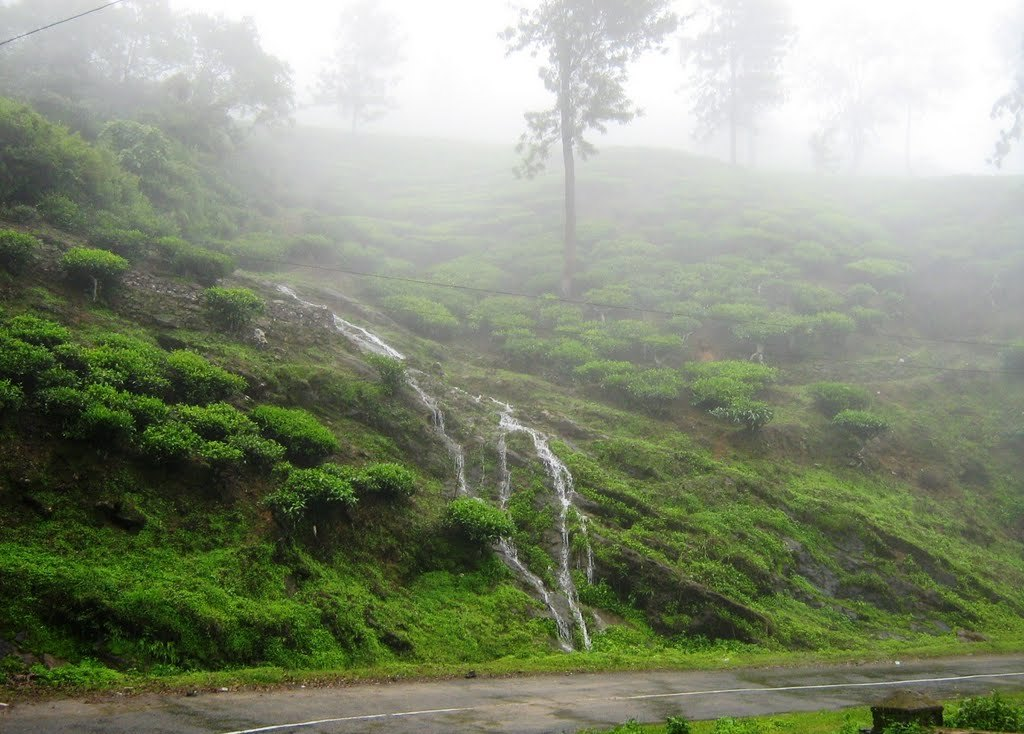
Monsoon stream flowing through a tea estate in Peermade

== See also ==
- Thodupuzha
- Kattappana
- Erattupetta
- Pala
- Kumily
- Kuttikkanam
- Manjumala
- Mundakayam
- Kottayam
- Vagamon
- Peer Mohammed Dargah

== Books ==
- The Story of Peermade by George Thengummoottil (ISBN 9788192888606) http://theindia.info/theIndiainfo/downloads/The%20Story%20of%20Peermade.pdf
