= Kadayanickadu =

- village
- Interactive map of Kadayanickadu
- Coordinates: 9°29′0″N 76°44′0″E
- Country: India
- State: Kerala
- District: Kottayam

Languages
  - Official: Malayalam, English
- Time zone: UTC+5:30 (IST)
- Vehicle registration: KL-33

Kadayanickadu is a village situated 11 km east of Karukachal, spread out on either sides of Changanacherry - Manimala road in Kerala, India. It is a typical Kerala rural settlement with the nature's green covering, ringing rivulets, small hills and slopes, agricultural fields, inhabited by rustic population. It is a Kara in Vellavoor revenue village in Changanacherry taluk, Kottayam district.

== Geographical location ==
The nearest railway stations are Kottayam (32 km) and Changanacherry (28 km), and the nearest Airport is Cochin Airport (Nedumbassery) about 81 km away.

== Etymology ==
The name Kadayanickadu is composed of three syllables, namely 'Kada,' 'Ani' and 'Kadu.' 'Kada' means the end or the last portion. 'Ani' means Mother Goddess Devi. 'Kadu' is jungle as also abode of Devi. Thus 'Anikadu' means a 'Kadu (or Kavu)' where Devi is installed. There is an ancient Devi temple here. The place Kadayanickadu lies in the middle-end of two Anikadus in the neighborhood - Anikadu north and Anicadu south with very famous Devi temples. 'Kada,' the middle-end of both the Anikadus became ‘Kadayanikadu,’ the abode of Mother Goddess. The whole Anikadu area would have been once a single unit. It is also possible that the name is derived from ‘Ayini’ tree (also known as 'Anjili' - Artocarpus hirsutus), which was abundantly found and widely used in the construction of ancient houses in this area. Another possibility is that the name coined from the word 'Katyayani,' (also Kathyayini), another name for goddess Durga in Sanskrit. Two ancient Devi temples of Kadayanickadu reinforce this conjecture.

=== History and Culture ===
There is no legendary evidence even to know when human habitation commenced here. It has got a hoary past. There are certain house/locality names like Vizhapadikal, Paruvackadu, Karimpanil, Kallikal, Murudenpalakal, the correct import of the words is not deducible in current Malayalam. These words would have been used in very old days. This throws light on the fact that human habitation started here hundreds of years back.

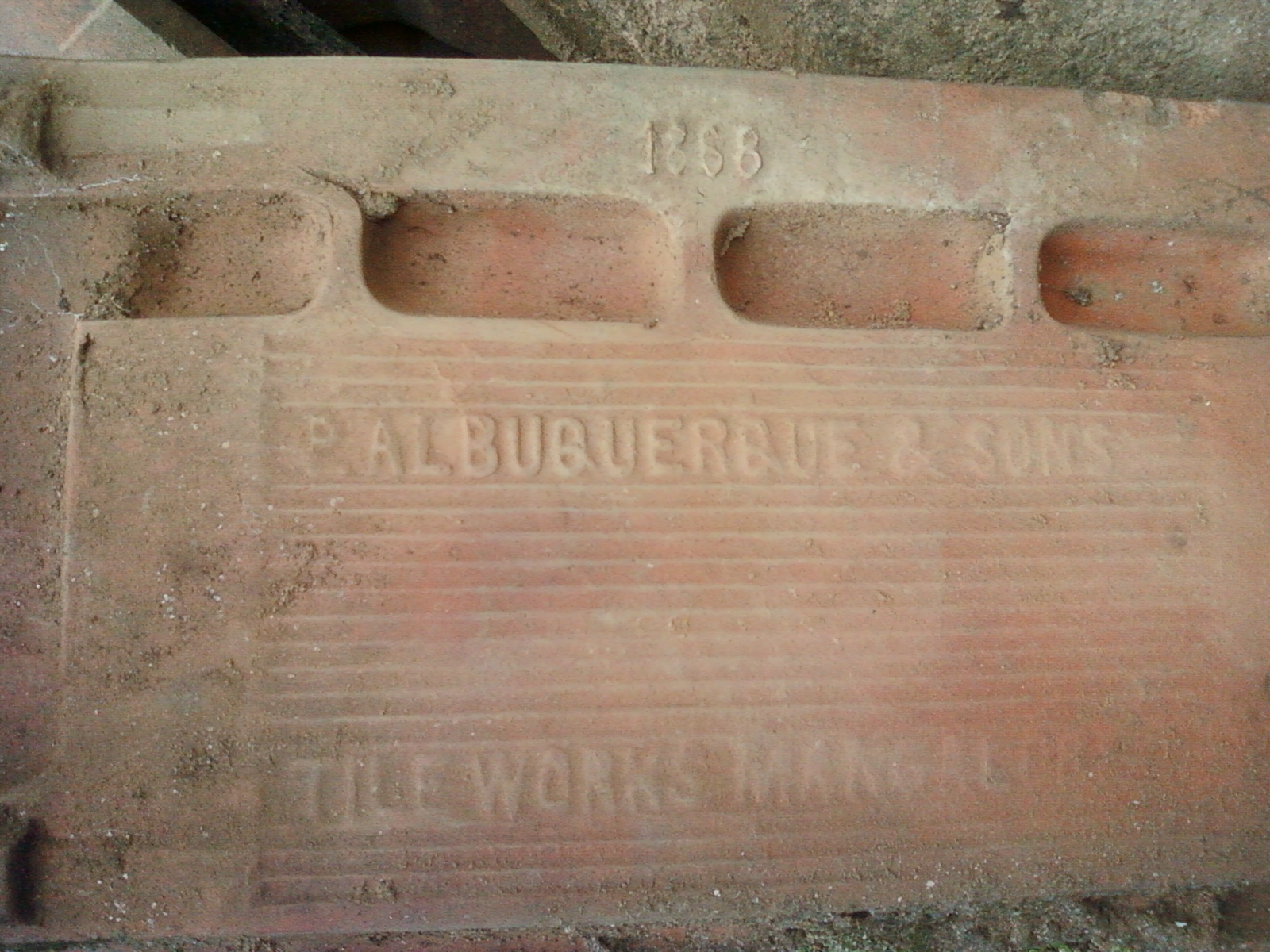
Roof tiles of Thayyil Tharavadu manufactured by P. Albuquerque & Sons Mangalore in the year 1868

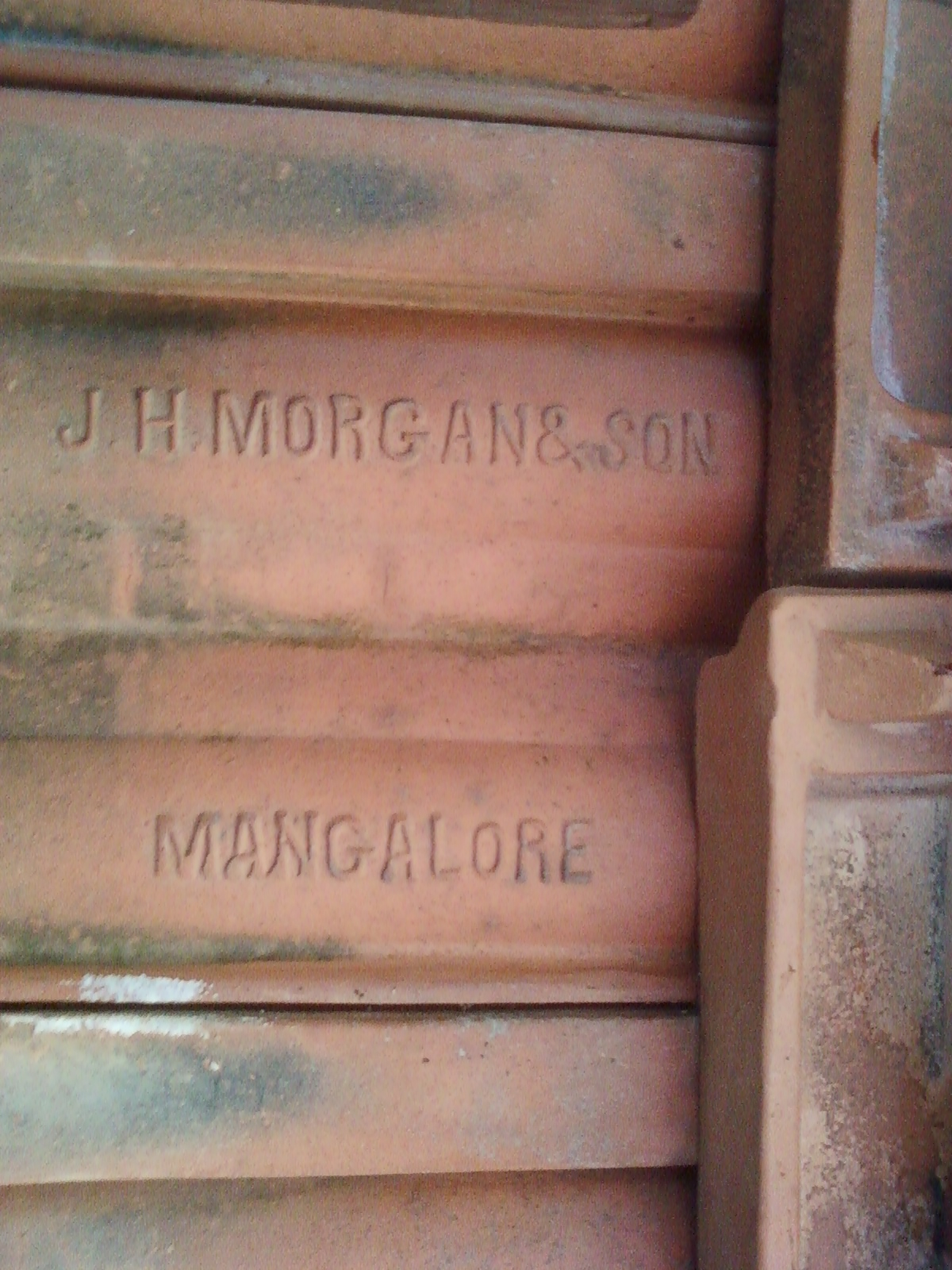
Another set of roof tiles of Thayyil Tharavadu manufactured by J. H. Morgan & Sons Mangalore

== Thekkukoor Kingdom ==
According to known history, it was once part of Thekkumkoor kingdom, and was under the control of two Local Lords (Madampies), namely Ranni Kartha and Agasthanathu Nair, responsible for the maintenance of law and order as also tax collection. In AD 1749 King Marthanda Varma captured Thekkumkoor and annexed it to Venad. All the previous Local Lords were removed from the posts and the king brought his own loyal people for the administration. The entire land from the precincts of Nedumkunnam to Chirakkadavu, extending for about 20 km was put under the progeny of a woman who was brought in marriage from Chelampaneth family of Ayroor to Madhavakottu family in Kangazha. This family was later divided into three branches or Tharavadus. Kangazha area came under the control of Eranattu or Erattu and Kadayanickadu under Thayyil Tharavadu.

== Thayyil Tharavadu ==
It is believed that a prominent Karnavar of that time, Thayyil Samprathipillai, who was also the palace head clerk, rebuilt the Thayyil Tharavadu buildings about 250 years ago. It is a wooden building structure measuring 40 X 25 feet covered with fireproof brick and lime mortar on the top. There is a vast underground cell (Nilavara) and inner cells constructed in such away as to store paddy produced in the vast stretch of land owned by the family at that time. Closely placed wooden ceiling beams of its roof and the tiles of M/s. P. Albuquerque & Sons, Mangalore manufactured in the year 1868 are evidencing the fact that the house was formerly thatched, but has later been tiled.

== Nair families ==
The north eastern a part of Kadayanikadu is owned and inhabited by other Nair families from very old times. They are Kannankavunkal, Kulathinkal, Mukkanolil, Vellachira and Pulinthara. They had their own temple, and Sarpa Kavu which exists even today.

== Ezhava Community ==
Another prominent sect is Ezhavas. They live in the north western corner areas. The legendary belief is that they are the progeny of a Namboothiri woman from elsewhere who married an Ezhava and settled here. The famous Kadayanickadu Devi temple is owned by them. It is believed that the idol installed there was the one used by the Namboothiri women for her personal worship. The Ezhavas of Kadayanickadu follow a high standard of living, rather orthodox and are mostly land owners. The main families are Vakananil, Konattu, Panackapathalil, Koyippuram and Puthanpurackal. The other backward classes and castes like Ulaya, Pulayars, Paravans etc. are also living here as sons of the soil for centuries. Their ancestors would have been agricultural labors.

== Christian Community ==
A few Christian families also live here from very old times. The earliest appears to be Ambalattumkal. In those days there was a belief that once a certain Hindu community (oil mongers) makes coconut oil, one Christian person has to touch that oil for purification. It is believed that Ambalattumkal family was brought and settled here for the purpose of "oil purification by touch." The other Christian families are Sarpathummuri, Mathilakam, Poothiot & Thottiyil. Malayil family came from Vazhoor and settled here. Several Christians from Kozhencherry came and settled in Thottathumkuzhyil area. These families are still known as Kozhencherry family. Abraham Mathai, Thondutharayil was the first one to settle down in Kadayanickadu from Kozhencherry. Most of the Christians are engaged in commercial and farming activities. Hindus, Christians and Muslims lived cordially and peacefully in Kadayanickadu for several years.

== Community Life ==
In Kadayanikadu complete interaction mutual respects, co operation exists between all the castes, creed & faiths. There are major temples, two for Devi and for Sastha. The Sasta temple is owned by NSS - Nair Service Society Karayogam, one Devi temple by SNDP - Sree Narayana Dharma Paripalana and the other by Ayyappa Seva Sangham. St Mary’s Church, Kadayanickadu is a Syro-Malabar Catholic church under the Archeparchy of Changanassery dedicated to Our Lady of Dolours.

Snake worship prevailed here from very long times. The Sarpakavu at Vellachira, Kannankavu, Pulinthara and Palathu are owned by the respective families.

=== Prominent Institutions ===
Vimala Poor Home Kadayanickadu which came into existence on 13 October 1979 is being run by Sisters of Adoration of the Blessed Sacrament(SABS), Changanacherry. This institution provides shelter to destitute women from all caste and creed. For this dream project of late Arch Bishop Antony Padiyara, Sarpathumury (Villampara) Mr. Chackochan and his brother John donated their two acres of land for free.

The inmates are provided with spiritual, recreational, medical and other amenities and also encouraged to take care of poultry and rabbit farming and also cultivation of vegetables.

=== Notable residents ===
V.S. Bhaskara Panicker (Rtd. Supdt.of Post Offices)- Writer and former Gen. Secretary, Akhila Bharatha Ayyappa Seva Sangham
Labour Commissioner TT Antony Thudiamplackal IAS

Ottamthullal exponent (late) K V Sukumaran Nair,

Ex.MLA kadayanickad Purushothaman Pillai,

Kathaprasangam Artist (late) A N R Pillai,

Ottamthullal exponent Kalamandalam purushothaman kartha,

Freedom Fighter and Gandhian (late) Padinjattayil Sankarapillai,

Writer and Novelist (late) Mohan D Kangazha,

Gandhian (late) V N Gopalakrishnapillai,

Mar Mathew Cheriankunnel PIME

=== Nearby Places ===
Kadayanickadu is situated near Manimala town. It is about 15 km from the famous Kanjirappally town and Ponkunnam. Also, Kadayanickadu is just about 20 km from Erumely, which is an important destination for Lord Ayyappa devotees during 'Mandala' season, en route to Sabarimala.

== Satellite image ==
- Satellite image of Kadayanickadu.
