= Kanjirappally Assembly constituency =

Constituency of the Kerala legislative assembly in India

Kanjirappally
- Constituency No. 100 for the Kerala Legislative Assembly
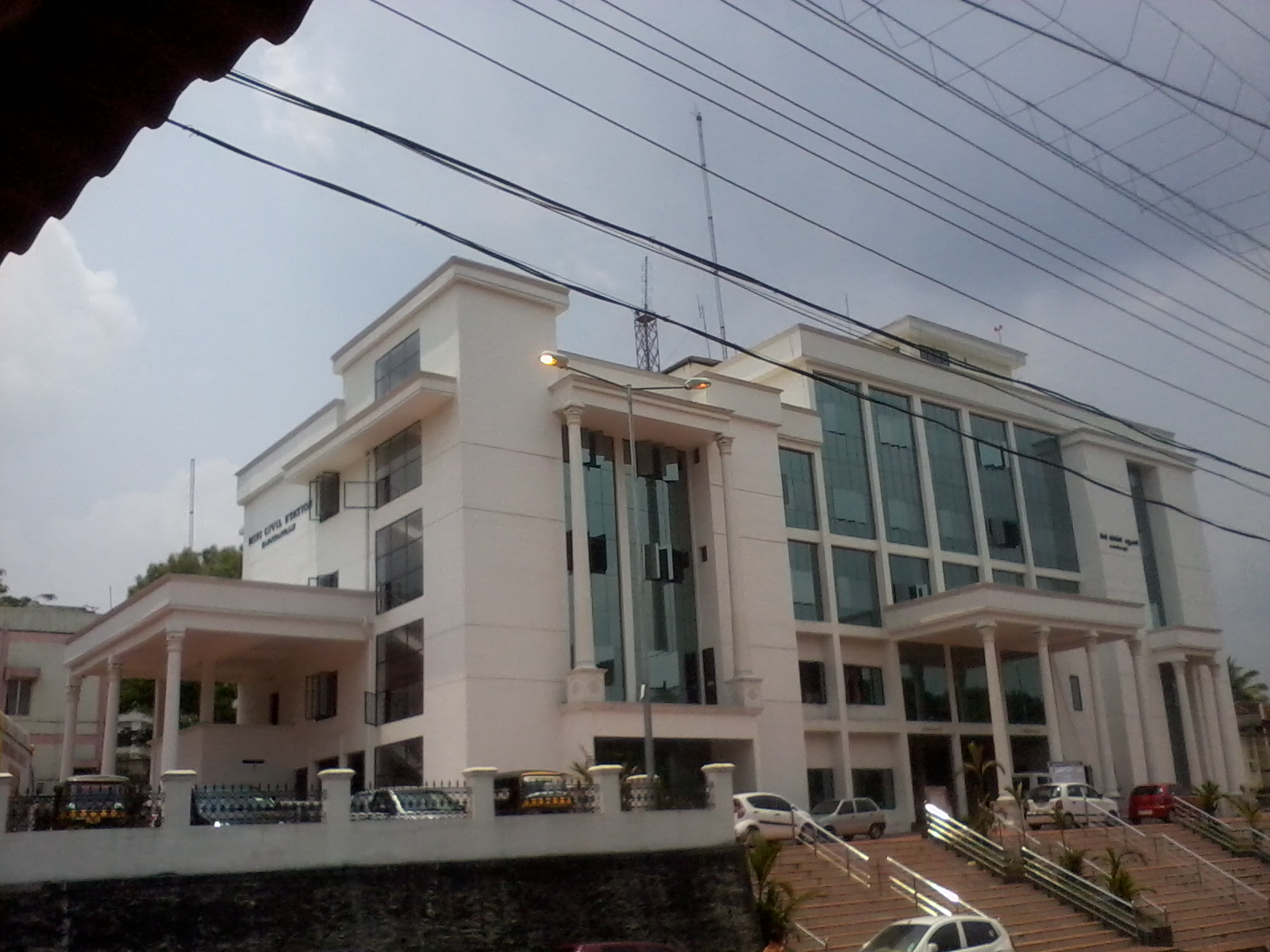
- Kanjirappally Mini-Civil Station

Constituency details
- Country: India
- Region: South India
- State: Kerala
- District: Kottayam
- Established: 1957
- Total electors: 1,78,950 (2016)
- Reservation: None

Member of Legislative Assembly
- 16th Kerala Legislative Assembly
- Incumbent Rony K Baby
- Party: Indian National Congress
- Alliance: UDF
- Elected year: 2026

Kanjirappally State assembly constituency is one of the 140 state legislative assembly constituencies in Kerala in southern India. It is also one of the seven state legislative assembly constituencies included in Pathanamthitta Lok Sabha constituency. As of the 2026 assembly elections, the current MLA is Rony K Baby of INC.

== Local self-governed segments ==
Kanjirappally Assembly constituency is composed of the following local self-governed segments:

Sl no.	Name	Status (Grama panchayat/Municipality)	Taluk
1	Chirakkadavu	Grama panchayat	Kanjirappally
2	Kanjirappally	Grama panchayat	Kanjirappally
3	Manimala	Grama panchayat	Kanjirappally
4	Kangazha	Grama panchayat	Changanassery
5	Karukachal	Grama panchayat	Changanassery
6	Nedumkunnam	Grama panchayat	Changanassery
7	Vazhoor	Grama panchayat	Changanassery
8	Vellavoor	Grama panchayat	Changanassery
9	Pallickathode	Grama panchayat	Kottayam

== Members of Legislative Assembly ==
Election	Niyama Sabha	Name	Party	Tenure
1957	1st	K. T. Thomas	Indian National Congress	1957 – 1960
1960	2nd	K. T. Thomas	Indian National Congress	1960 – 1965
1967	3rd	M. Kamal	Communist Party of India	1967 – 1970
1970	4th	K. V. Kurian	Kerala Congress	1970 – 1977
1977	5th	K. V. Kurian	Kerala Congress	1977 – 1980
1980	6th	Thomas Kallampally	Kerala Congress	1980 – 1982
1982	7th	Thomas Kallampally	Kerala Congress	1982 – 1987
1987	8th	K. J. Thomas	Communist Party of India	1987 – 1991
1991	9th	George J. Mathew	Indian National Congress	1991 – 1996
1996	10th	George J. Mathew	Indian National Congress	1996 – 2001
2001	11th	George J. Mathew	Indian National Congress	2001 – 2006
2006	12th	Alphons Kannanthanam	Independent	2006 – 2011
2011	13th	N. Jayaraj	Kerala Congress	2011 – 2016
2016	14th	N. Jayaraj	Kerala Congress	2016 - 2021
2021	15th	N. Jayaraj	Kerala Congress	2021 - 2026
2026	16th	Rony K Baby	INC	Incumbent

== Election results ==
Percentage change (±%) denotes the change in the number of votes from the immediate previous election.

=== 2026 ===
2026 Kerala Legislative Assembly election: Kanjirappally
Party	Candidate	Votes	%	±%
INC	Rony K Baby	56,646	41.66	▲7.82
KC(M)	N. Jayaraj	50,874	37.41	▼6.38
BJP	George Kurien	26,984	19.84	▼1.33
NOTA	None of the above	788	0.58	▲0.13
BSP	Thampi Kavumpadam	696	0.51	▼0.02
Margin of victory		5,774	4.24	▼5.71
Turnout		1,35,988		
INC gain from KC(M)		Swing	-	

=== 2021 ===
2021 Kerala Legislative Assembly election: Kanjirappally
Party	Candidate	Votes	%	±%
KC(M)	N. Jayaraj	60,299	43.79	▲4.93
INC	Joseph Vazhackan	46,596	33.84	−
BJP	Alphons Kannanthanam	29,157	21.17	▼1.81
BSP	Ashik M M	727	0.53	
NOTA	None of the above	624	0.45	−
Independent	Sajan C. Madhavan	90	0.07	−
Margin of victory		13,703	9.95	▲7.11
Turnout		1,37,703	73.76	▼2.63
KC(M) hold		Swing	-	

=== 2016 ===
There were 1,78,950 registered voters in the constituency for the 2016 Kerala Assembly election.

2016 Kerala Legislative Assembly election: Kanjirappally
Party	Candidate	Votes	%	±%
KC(M)	N. Jayaraj	53,126	38.86	▼11.54
CPI	V. B. Binu	49,236	36.02	▼3.59
BJP	V. N. Manoj	31,411	22.98	▲15.88
BSP	Arun M. John	1,113	0.81	▼2.08
SDPI	Muhammed Siyad	839	0.61	−
NOTA	None of the above	618	0.45	−
Independent	Manoj Aruvikkuzhy	138	0.10	−
Independent	Achuthan K. P.	137	0.10	−
Independent	Sajan C. Madhavan	90	0.07	−
Margin of victory		3,890	2.84	▼7.95
Turnout		1,36,708	76.39	▲6.40
KC(M) hold		Swing	▼11.54	

=== 2011 ===
There were 1,61,648 registered voters in the constituency for the 2011 election.

2011 Kerala Legislative Assembly election: Kanjirappally
Party	Candidate	Votes	%	±%
KC(M)	N. Jayaraj	57,021	50.40	
CPI	Suresh T. Nair	44,815	39.61	−
BJP	Rajamohan	8,037	7.10	
BSP	P. K. Geetha Krishnan	3,268	2.89	▲0.59
Margin of victory		12,206	10.79	
Turnout		1,13,141	69.99	▲2.68
KC(M) gain from Independent		Swing		

== See also ==
- Kanjirappally
- Kottayam district
- List of constituencies of the Kerala Legislative Assembly
- 2016 Kerala Legislative Assembly election
