= Kanam (Kerala) =

- Village
- Location in Kerala, India Kanam (India)
- Coordinates: 9.5166667°N 76.71°E
- Country: India
- State: Kerala
- District: Kottayam

Area
  - Total: 7 km^{2} (2.7 sq mi)
- Elevation: 81 m (266 ft)

Population (2001)
  - Total: 3,400
  - Density: 490/km^{2} (1,300/sq mi)

Languages
  - Official: Malayalam, English
- Time zone: UTC+5:30 (IST)
- PIN: 686515
- Telephone code: 91 481
- Vehicle registration: KL

Kanam is a small town in the Kottayam district of Kerala, India. It is about 25 km from Kottayam Town on the way to Kumily Road, 2 km from Kodungoor Junction (Vazhoor).

== Demographics ==
As of 2001 India census, Kanam had a population of 3,400. Males constitute 47% of the population and females 53%. Kanam has an average literacy rate of 77%, higher than the national average of 59.5%: male literacy is 80%, and female literacy is 75%. In Kanam, 11% of the population is under 6 years of age.

== History ==
Originally Kanam Kara of Kangazha Muri, Vazhoor village of Changanacherry Taluk in Kottayam District, Kerala, belonged to the Edappally Swaroopam Brahmin royalty. A Bhagavathy (Mother Goddess) temple stood in Kanam. Edappally Thampuran had a consort in the Parapallil Kaimal’s family and when Thampuran died, she returned to Kanam with documents about the properties. Therefore, the Edappally Swaroopam, the family of the Thampuran, neglected to look after the Bhagavathy temple properties, and they became dilapidated. The temple ruins were removed by Christian settlers who came to the southern parts of Kanam. The temple tank, known as "Amrutham Chira", which had been used to irrigate the nearby paddy fields was filled and converted into a paddy field. The northern and western parts of Kanam were bought from the Kutaluvally Namboothiri by the aristocratic Vellala family of Thundathil. The name of this area was derived from the Sanskrit word kananam, which means 'forest'.

== CSI Church and CMS School ==
The church was founded by Reverend Henry Baker, Jr., an Anglican missionary who came to Travancore. Though its formal establishment was in 1862, church services for residents were held at the Perumprathazha (Payikad) house. Later, services relocated to a place called Thekkadathu Parambu, and a small thatched shed was made for worship. The shed, however, was destroyed later by wildfire, whereupon a small tiled-roof church building was built. Mr. Chacko Varghese Wicharippukar of the Payikad family very kindly donated the plot for the building (he had also donated the site of St. Thomas Orthodox Church at Kangazha. Though the place is rudimentary, the Church Mission Society (CMS) has significantly improved the area's socio-economic life through lasting contributions for all-around development. About 150 years ago the CMS created a primary school near the CSI church and converted many tribal people and members from more affluent families to Christianity. The Christians colonizing the Kanem's southern areas built rubber plantations. Later, Mr. Wicharippukar's son, Payikad Varghese (popularly known as Kunjoojukutty Mapilla), the largest rubber planter, built a two-story building in Kanam, popularly known as "Malikayil" near the CMS School. It is now the 96 year old heritage house, which Kanam villagers advertise as a tourist attraction by the St. George Orthodox Church.

For more information about CSI church and the CMS school visit

For more information about St. Thomas Orthodox Church Kangazha visit

== Kanam Balabhavan ==
In October 1959, the Children's Emergency Relief organization "Kindernothilfe" (KNH) Kinternothilfe(KNH) was founded by Karl Borman and other Christians in Duisburg, West Germany, aiming to help needy Indian children. Borman was influenced by the speech of German theologian Pastor Martin Niemöller (who had escaped from Nazi prison), about the need to help the suffering. Aided by a Basel missionary near the end of 1959 KNH started its first project in South India at Paraperi under the CSI North Kerala Diocese. Slowly many projects started.

In 1966, Kanam Balabhavan began in Kanam under the CSI Madhya Kerala Diocese. Forty boys from needy situations were admitted irrespective of caste or creed. The CSI church set apart one acre of land for this effort. From its very beginning until 2011, Mr. K.E. George was the manager and backbone of Balabhavan. Many hundreds of children have attained good positions after their education. Children receive ample opportunities to develop their talents apart from their academic studies. Cow and rabbit rearing, beekeeping, agriculture, and gardening were some of the early work experience programs. Currently, about 50 children below age 13 stay here and study in the CMS High School. After secondary school, they are guided to choose higher or technical studies according to their aptitude. These children are supported by foster parents in Germany and India.

Website: Kanam Balabhavan

== Shanmukhavilasom Schools ==
Admission to the CMS Primary School (CMSLPS) was given in preferentially to Christians and those likely to convert to Christianity. Children of Nair and Vellala background were admitted only by exception. As a consequence, Shanmughavilasom Arumugham Pillai of Thundathil family started Shnamugha Vilasom Primary School with the support of N.S Raman Pillai, Peshkar of Kottayam. Many members of the Thundathil family-like Cherukappallil Chellamma, Kalappurayidathil Sankara Pillai, Krishna Pillai, and Shanmugha Vilasom Ammini Amma taught at this school. Over time, CMSLPS grew to become the middle school and then the high school. These three temples of learning have produced many doctors, engineers, teachers, government officers, and defense personnel from Kanam.

== Roads ==
Long ago there were no roads to Kanam. From Kottayam, Bishop Hodges came by horseback to visit the CSI church. The present Kanjiraparra-Kanam Road came into being because the church existed here. Kodungoor-Kappukadu-Kanam Road was built by Shanmughavilasom Arumugham Pillai. Ummini Kartha of Anickadu donated 4 acres (16,000 m^{2}) of land for the road. Initially there was an Athani settlement here, hence the junction was named Elappunkal. There also was a wayside inn near the junction, where Karthas distributed free buttermilk to travelers in the summer.

== Industry ==
An attempt was made to train weavers in the weaving school founded and headed by late Abraham (Parappallythazhe Avarachen) in Athumpanakuzhy, but it failed prematurely amidst World War II. Small scale industries like handloom weaving, cotton dyeing, and printing were also attempted in Kanam but became casualties of the war. Shanmughavilasom Arumugham Pillai started another weaving factory near Kotchukanjirappara in Naithusala parambu, headed by Gopalan Nair of Nedumkunnam.

== Place of worship ==
When the Bhagavathy Temple was rebuilt in Poduvakunnu (Elamkavil) in Kangazha North, Kanam was the only village in the neighborhood with no temple. The only place of worship left was the Nallanikuzhy Kavu near Kotchukanjirappara Pallikkodam, where annual offerings ("Vellamkudi") were presented during Onam and Vishu by the Pulaya caste of Eattikal. But with Pulayas embracing Christianity nobody came for annual offerings after the late Oman Pulayan. The place has been converted into an Ayyappa Temple with monthly pooja services. Today villagers gather according to faith and belief in worship places such as Hebron Christian Brethren Assembly in Kanam, the Indian Pentecostal Church of God (IPC) Prayer Hall in Kanjirappara, The Pentecostal Mission (TPM) in Paathippalam, Church Of Christ Pidisheerimala, St. Thomas Marthoma Church, St. Mary's Orthodox Church, St. George Orthodox church and Paathippalam Muslim Masjid.

== Community life ==
Senior citizens meet at Kotchukalappurayidam, also knownas Prevathicar Veedu, to play cards, read newspapers and hold discussions. Mrs. Govinda Pillai (Ittooli Kutty Amma was the only woman to play cards along with men.) The younger generation takes to native games of bale, kilithattu, chadukudu, and the like. Onam, Vishu, and Thiruvathira festivals are celebrated with pomp by Hindus while Christmas and Easter are observed by Christians. A common celebration is held to observe the annual Thirunal (Birthday of Maha Raja). The Anniversary of the Primary Schools is observed by staff, students and the general public, often overflowing the school hall; festival attendees had to stand outside to hear speeches, songs and to watch dramas, one-act plays, and fancy costumes. Public sports would also attract non-student youth to participate.

== Libraries ==
The national movement had little impact in Kanam, but when the Malayala Manorama newspaper was banned and the National Quilon Bank (where many farmers had deposits) was liquidated, feelings of antagonism gradually grew toward Dewan central Islamic finance. The State Congress movement has spread rapidly among Christians but slowly among Hindus. Students were the first to raise the banner of revolt. Of interest is that it was among Hindus that Communist ideology began to grow, even though they were reluctant to absorb the anti-Dewan sentiments of the State Congress. With the advent of freedom, Mahatma Gandhi, the paragon worshipped by the student population began to be adored by all. Two libraries named after Gandhiji sprang up. Mahathma Library (under leadership of T.K. Krishnan Nair, KK, Prabhakaran Nair, and K.C. Sivan Pillai), and Bapuji Library near the CMS Anglican Church (under leadership of Kanam E.J., Thottaparmbil Baby Perumprathazhe Vavachan, and Venattu Kochu). Both libraries collapsed when the workers, who had been students, took to jobs or went away for higher studies, for want of second-line workers.

== Communist Party ==
The Mahathma Library sowed the seeds of the Communist movement in Kanam. "The Life of Karl Marx" written by Swadesabhimani Ramakrishna Pillai, "Pattabhakki", other dramas by K. Damodharan, and similar books lead to a consciousness of the evils of inequality. The second general election to the State Assembly when Kangazha Baskaran Nair stood as a candidate on a Socialist party ticket, was utilized by young students to educate common people about socialist ideologies. T.K. Krishnan Nair was the first to become a party member and later, when he returned after graduation, a group was organized with Kanam Sivan Pillai, KK, Prabhakaran Nair, KK. Raghavan Nair etc. The "Janathiapathya Munnani" under leadership of Kadayanikadu Purushothaman Pillai had its propaganda machinery working in Kanam, along with Kangazha, Kadayanikadu, Mundathanam, Nedumkunnam, and neighboring villages. The "Rationkada Samaram" brought people to the street against the unauthorized price hikes by ration dealers by way of service charges, rounding off bills, etc. During the Panchayat election, a candidate, Perumal Pillai, was put against Mr. P.V. Varghese (who later became the first Kangazha Panchayat President), the Congress candidate, but failed to get representation to Kangazha Panchayat.

By the time the CMS Primary School was upgraded to a middle school, Vidyadhiraja Swamikal started the Sree Vidyadhiraja Vidya (SVRV) Nair Service Society (NSS) School at Theerthapadapuram, Vazhoor. After CMS UPS was upgraded to High School and St. Paul's UPS at Pulickalkavala was also upgraded. Education spread and every boy and girl had the facility to get general education. Up until then only a few fortunate families had the facility for higher education, because of its high cost. Hostel charges, which once accounted for 85% of education costs, were rendered unnecessary with the establishment of several high schools and colleges in the vicinity.

With the advent of higher education, the facility for political consciousness began to grow and Kanam was able to offer two candidates in the Vazhoor constituency for assembly elections. Adv. Kanam Sivan Pillai (CPM) and Kanam Rajendran (CPI). The latter won the seat twice. Now the CPM and CPI have a strong hold over the village. The communists of early years are leading their retired lives and some of them have died. The names of Pampady Balan, Anickadu PK. Sankara Pillai -"Stalin" Sankara Pillai is now "Ganapthy" Sankara Pillai Elakkadu purushan, Kadayanickadu Purushothaman Pillai Ex. MLA and Kottayam Bhasi and Johny Syriac are also associated with the spread of communist ideology in Kanam. Kanam Rajendran (CPI) is one of the leading political leaders from the village.

== Cooperative movement in Kanam ==
The Co-operative Movement of the Vazhoor Village also had its roots in Kanam. It was Sri. MN.Sankara Pillai, HM SVLPS, and Payattukala (Vellakallumkal) Chacko who took steps to establish the Vazhoor Farmers Service Cooperative Bank

Lyrics of Kanam EJ
