= Nedumkunnam =

- village
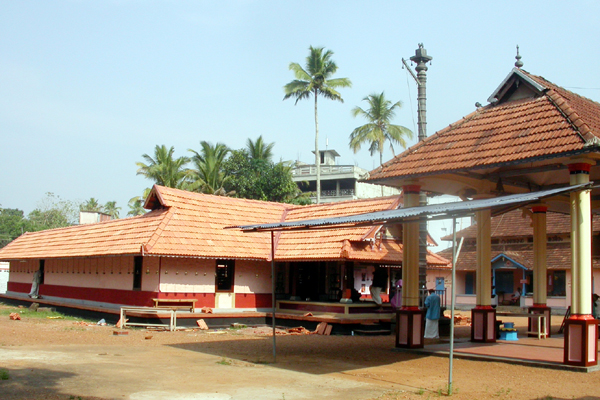
- Nedumkunnam Temple
- Interactive map of Nedumkunnam
- Coordinates: 9.5°N 76.66°E
- Country: India
- State: Kerala
- District: Kottayam

Population (2001)
  - Total: 22,505

Languages
  - Official: Malayalam, English
- Time zone: UTC+5:30 (IST)
- PIN: 686 542
- Vehicle registration: KL-33

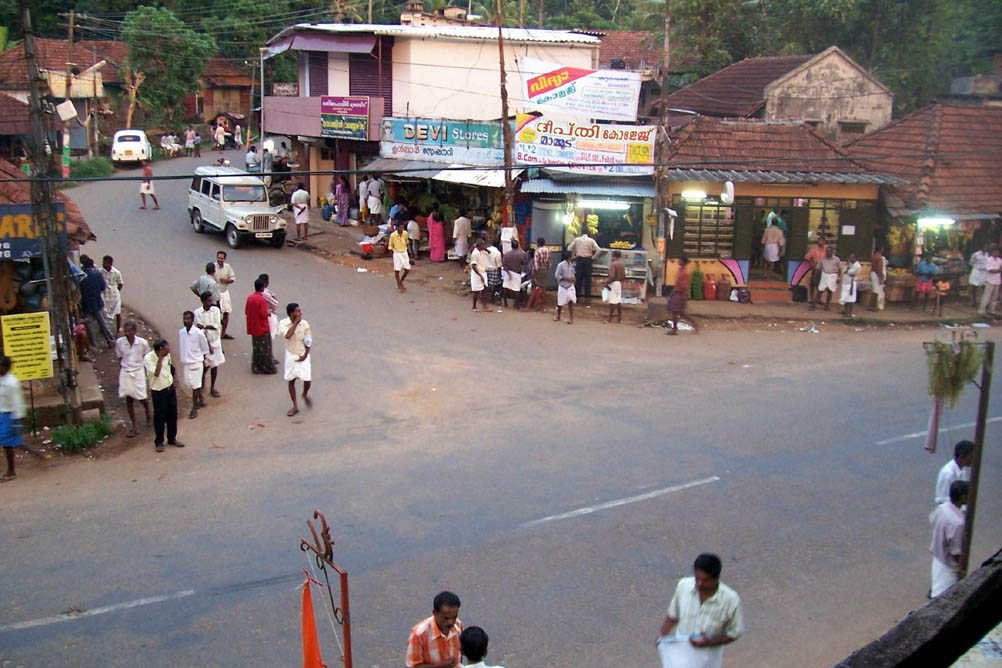
Kavum Nada

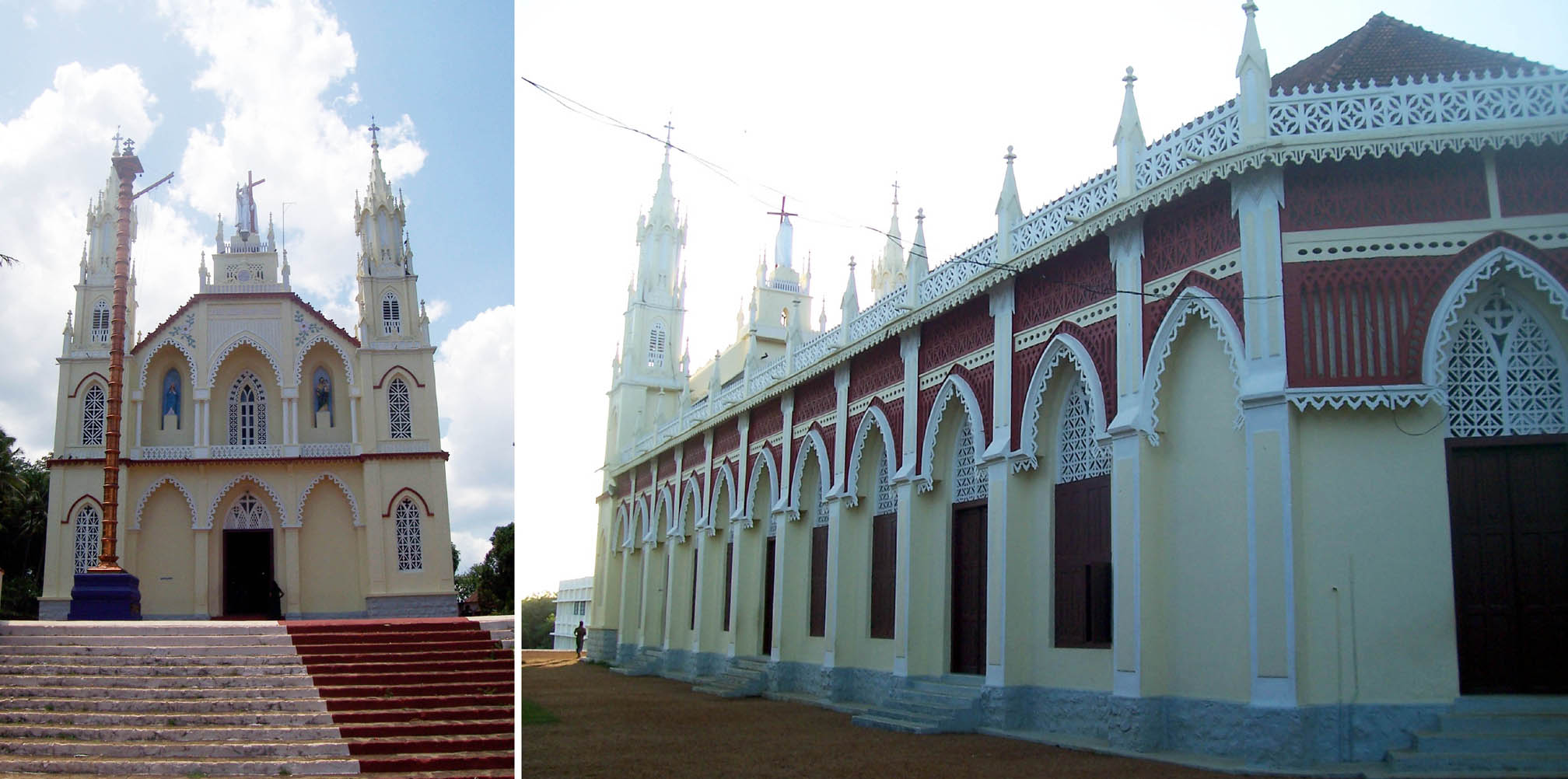
NDKM Church

Nedumkunnam is a village in Kerala, India, located about 16 km East of Changanacherry on Changanacherry-Manimala Road, in Kottayam district. It is 3 km East of Karukachal towards Manimala/Cheruvally.

== Geography ==
Literally, it is the 'land of hills', being on the hilly terrain. It is between the High Ranges and the Kuttanad plains in Central Kerala.

== History ==
Nedumkunnam was the centre of trade and commerce in the area for nearly two centuries. Earlier it included lands up to Champakara in the North to Vaipur in the South, Karukachal in the West and Kanam/Kangazha Pathanadu in the East.
It is fast becoming a centre of education in Central Kerala.

== Administration ==
The taluk (local government) headquarters is located in Changanacherry and the District headquarters in Kottayam. Local people mostly work as farmers, cultivating cash crops such as rubber and black pepper, and food crops such as cassava and plantain. The village is also a good base for trekking through hills in the local area. Sight-seeing destinations include are Mulamala, Chathanpara, Puliyalackalpara and Nilampodinja. Village center is at Kavumnada that hosts the Panchayat Office, village office, major commercial institutions, banks and shops.

== Suburbs and villages ==
Nearby places include Punnavely, Pathanadu, Karukachal, Vellavoor, Mallappally, Kangazha, Kanam (Kerala), Champakara, Vaipur, Noorommavu, Nedumanny, Mulayanveli etc.

== Transportation ==
Nearest Railway stations: Kottayam (23 km) or Changanacherry (16 km)
Nearest Airport is Cochin Airport (Nedumbasserry)- 75 km Nedumkunnam can be reached by road from Changanacherry or Kottayam. See the Kottayam District map for details.

== Population statistics ==
According to Government of India Census 2001 statistics, population statistics for Nedumkunnam village are as given below:
No of Households: 5,040
Total number of persons: 22,505
Males: 10,911 Females: 11,594
The following are the average numbers for Kottayam District. Specific numbers for Nedumkunnam Village are yet to be obtained.
The literacy rate for Kottayam District is 95%. The population distribution is 50% Hindus, 45% Christians and 5% Muslims.

== Temples ==
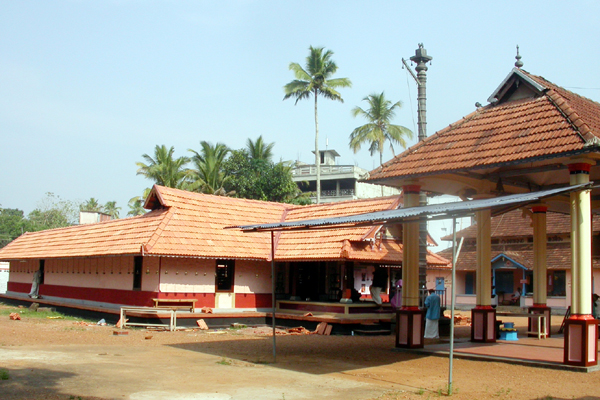
Nedumkunnam Sree Bhadrakali Temple

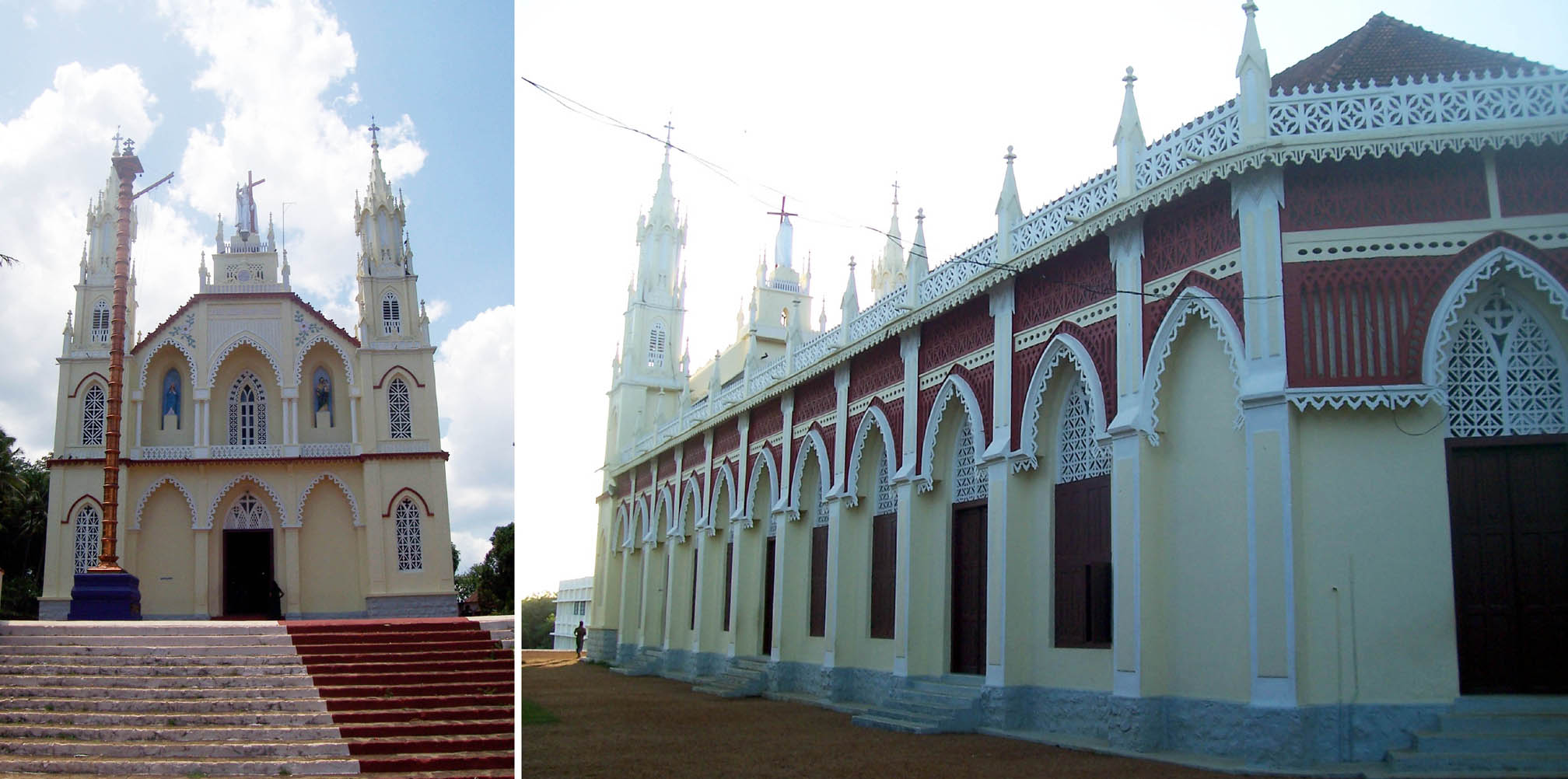
NDKMChurch

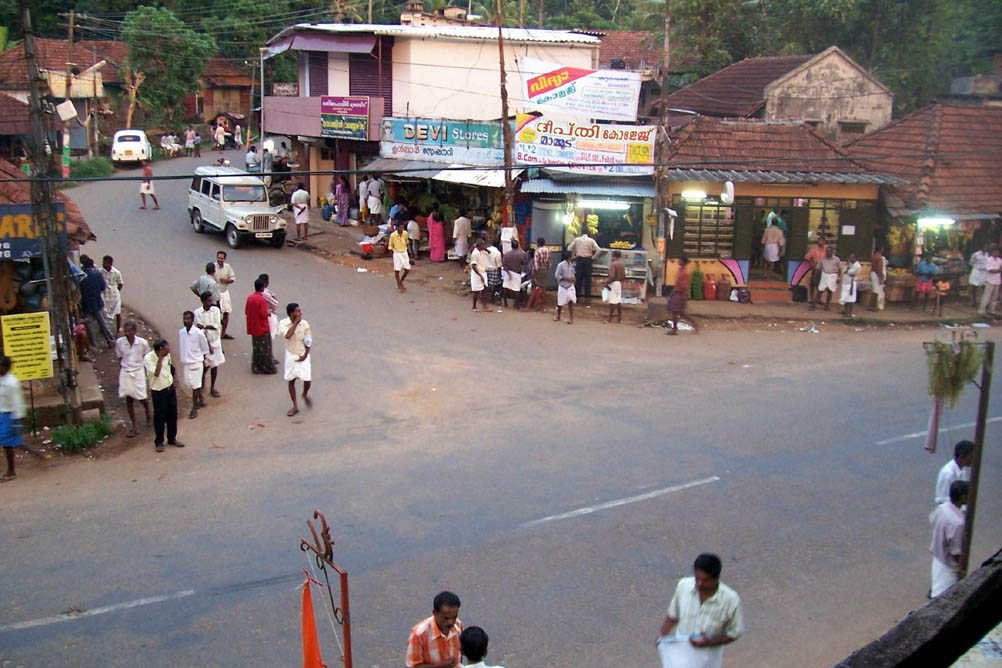
Kavumnada Junction

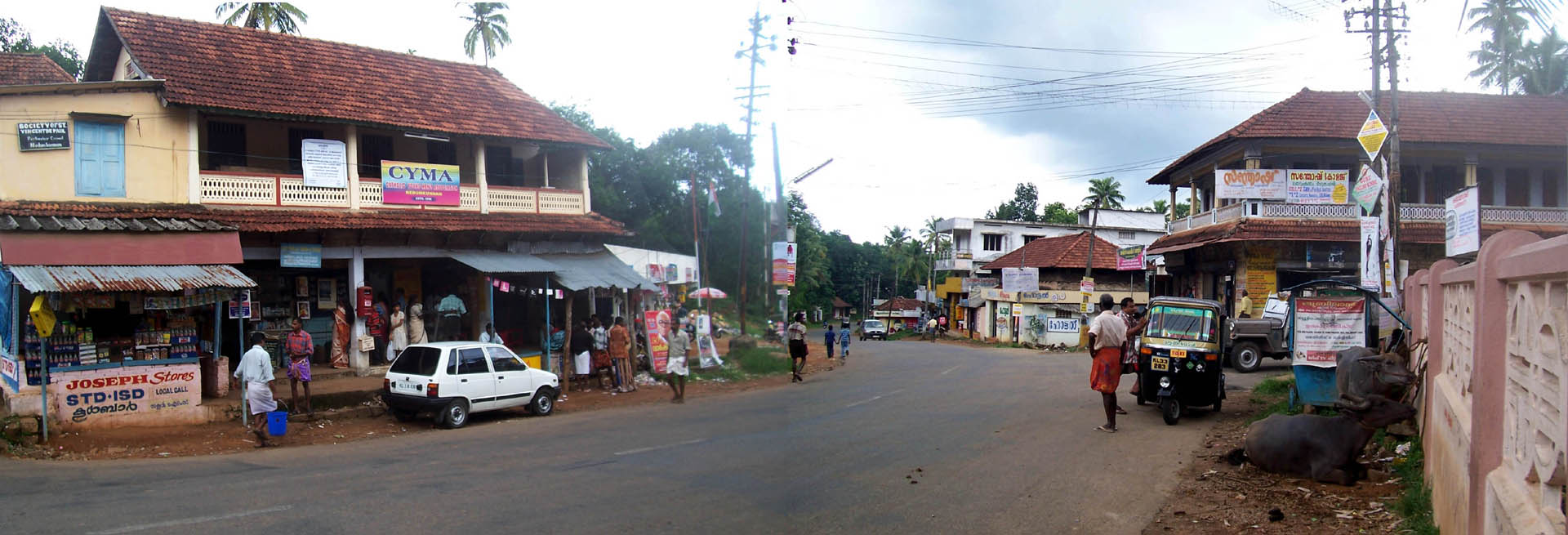
Pallippady

The Nedumkunnam Bhagavati Temple is one of the oldest temples in Kerala. Nedumkunnam's ancient historical status is indicated by its geographical proximity and easy accessibility using waterways (River Manimala) or the road, to the ancient towns or ports of Niranam, Kaviyoor, Tiruvalla, Changanassery, Kottayam and Alappuzha. Vaipur on River Manimala had Christian settlements from the thirteenth century and must have been a center of timber trade using timber from the forests of Nedumkunnam, Manimala, etc.

Towards the latter half of the eighteenth century, people started settling in Nedumkunnam. They cleared the forest areas and started cultivating various highland produce, such as tapioca, coconut, black pepper, coffee, arecanut, ginger, etc. Trade in timber from the forests and the spices, increased.

The Mukkattu Syrian Christian family monopolized the spice and timber trade. They stayed near the temple. According to tradition, Christians had to purify the oil used in the local Hindu temple. Such purification was required when people of different castes started visiting the temple and donating oil to the temple and Christians were considered as merchants outside Hindu caste system.
