= Punnavely =

- Village
- Anikkattilamma Shiva Parvathy temple
- Interactive map of Punnavely
- Coordinates: 9.4911°N 76.69178°E
- Country: India
- State: Kerala
- District: pathanamthitta
- Elevation: 81 m (266 ft)

Languages
  - Official: Malayalam, English
- Time zone: UTC+5:30 (IST)
- PIN: 689589
- Vehicle registration: KL 28
- Sex ratio: 1058 ♂/♀

Punnavely is a village in Thiruvalla Constituency situated on the border of Pathanamthitta and Kottayam districts of Kerala, India. Punnavely is a typical Central Tranvancore village with rubber tree plantations, paddy fields, pepper and other spices and lot of NRIs.

== Etymology ==
"Punna" is the Malayalam term for the Ball Nut tree (Calophyllum inophyllum), and "Vely" means "fence". Punnavely is famous for its old time fences that were built with logs and branches from punna trees.

== Location ==
Most areas of the wider Punnavely fall under Anicadu Grama Panchayat, but because of its location at the boundary between two districts, some of its wards are in Nedumkunnam, Kangazha, and Vellavoor panchayats. The Manimala River forms the boundary of Punnavely on the East.

Kottayam, Changanacherry, and Thiruvalla are the three major towns (and railway stations) near the village, approximately 25 km away from the village in three different directions. Other small towns close to the village are Mallappally, Nedumkunnam and Karukachal (in a radius of 7 km). Nedumkunnam and Mallappaly are famous for their weekly markets.

The nearest airport is Cochin International Airport at Nedumbassery, approximately 105 km away. However, Trivandrum International Airport is also widely used.

== Educational institutions ==
Prominent educational institutions at Punnavely are: CMS LP School and CMS High School, managed by the local parish; St James Church of South India (CSI) Church, which falls under the CSI's Madhya Kerala Diocese; MRSLBV School Higher Secondary School at Thelappuzhakadav, a very famous old school started by Maharani Sethu Lakshmi Bayi of Travancore Princely state; and Kumbiluvely Government LP School, which is located in Kurishunkal.

A KNH Boarding Home for the underprivileged children was functioning in Punnavely for decades but it has since moved elsewhere and the CSI English Medium School now occupies the same building.

== Religion/Religious institutions ==
Christians, Hindus and Muslims form the majority of Punnavely's population.

Most of the common Kerala Christian denominations (Malankara Marthoma, CSI, Orthodox, Malankara Catholic, Roman Catholic, Pentecostal, etc.) are present here. St.Thomas Marthoma Church (Kallammakkal - St.Thomas Marthoma Yuvajanasakhyam, Punnavely), St James CSI Church at High School Jn. and four small churches affiliated to this church, St John's Orthodox Syrian Church (a.k.a. Thengumpallil Pally), Little Flower Catholic Church (Syro-Malabar) Punnavely, St. Joseph Catholic Church, Chakkalakunnu (Syro-Malabar) and two more Catholic churches at Mulayamveli & Nooromavu(Syro-Malankara) St. Stephen's CMS Anglican Church, Pattapurayidom, CMS Anglican Church, Ambalathinamkuzhy is also ancient Churches in Punnaveli and all other Christian denominations like Pentecostal Church, India Pentecostal, Church of God, Seventh Day Adventist, Evangelist etc. are in Punnavely. There is a convent (Little Flower Convent, Kulathunkal Kavala) associated with the Catholic Church.

Two mosques are situated at Pidannaplavu and Kurunnamveli: Punnavely Muslim Puthoor Pally and Puthukkudi Puthoor Pally

There is one Hindu temple near Mulayamveli. Other temples in close proximity are Anikadu Devi Temple (Kavanalkadvu) anikkattilammakshethram, Keezthrikkel sreekrishnaswamy temple managed by sree sankara charitable trust vaipur and Vaipur Mahadeva Temple (kunnumbhagham) managed by travanvore devaswom board. Shree Krishna Temple is situated at the center of Noorommavu, Anicadu, and managed by Kerala Vishwakarma Mahasabha.

== Hospitals and medical institutions ==
St. Martin's Hospital at Chakkalakkunnu and government dispensary at Thelappuzhakkadavu are the nearest hospitals. There are a couple of ayurvedic, homeopathic and dental clinics function in the village. The nearest medical college is at Kottayam. There are Primary Health Centres at Panakuzhipadi and Pullukuthy. There is also a veterinary clinic at Kulatungal Kavala.

== Facilities ==
The main post office is near the CMS High School junction. A sub-post office functional is located at Noorommavu. The telephone exchange in the village serves 80% of the area of the Anicadu Panchayat. All major mobile providers like BSNL, Idea, etc. have their network towers in the village. There is a Krishi Bhavan (under the agriculture department) in the village. Two Major banks, The Catholic Syrian Bank and The Thiruvalla East Cooperative Bank, and four village cooperative banks function in the village.

== Culture and population ==
The village is inhabited by various religious and caste communities. Farmers and the laborers have developed good inter-communal relationships over the years. There is strong emigration from the area and villagers are known to have migrated all parts of the world.

== Arts, sports and entertainment ==
Football and volleyball are still alive in the village although the younger generations are more inclined to cricket.

There is a one arts/sports club: Yuvadeepti Arts and Sports Club (in Kulathunkal Kavala).

== Some important concerns ==
The village still lacks modern public transportation. There are only a very few buses to connect Punnavely with neighboring towns. Mining of sand from the Manimala river bed has been going on despite being banned—trucks and excavators loaded with sand are a commons sight on the road leading out of the village. This activity adversely affects the water table in the area, causing depletion of water levels in the village's wells.

Nowadays, there is a shortage of farm hands in Punnavely leading to a considerable increase in the cost of agricultural production. Consequently, one may find most of the paddy fields uncultivated and many of them being used for vegetable or tapioca cultivation. A lot of paddy fields have also been converted for housing development.
