= Kannanthanam =

Kannanthanam is a Malayali surname. Notable people with the surname include:

- Alphons Kannanthanam (born 1953), Indian civil servant, lawyer, and politician
- Thampi Kannanthanam (1953−2018), Indian film director, screenwriter, producer, and actor
