= Mar Geevarghese Dionysious Memorial Hospital =

Hospital in Kerala

Mar Geevarghese Dionysious Memorial Hospital (MGDM) is a hospital established in 1964 in Kangazha under the Manohar Hill Charitable Trust.

== Specialty units ==
- Casualty, Accidents and Trauma Care Unit (24hrs)
- Post Operative Critical Care Unit
- Acute Medical Care unit attached to Casualty
- Medical ICU
- Neuro ICU/Stroke Unit
- Coronary Care Unit
- Govt. Licensed Blood Bank
- Vellre CMC Quality Controlled Laboratory (24Hrs)
- 24 Hrs Pharmacy Service
- Dialysis Unit - separate section for Hepatitis patients (24 hrs)
- Physiotherapy & Rehabilitation Services
- General Operation theatre complex.
- Eye Theatre

== Diagnostic and supportive services ==
- Stryker Knee Navigator
- Modern Clinical Laboratory
- Central 24Hr Pharmacy
- Computer Assisted Joint Transplantation
- C Arm
- X-ray
- Ultrasound Scan
- Echo Cardiography
- T M T
- Color Doppler
- E.C.G.
- E.E.G
- H.F.A.
- A - Scan
- B - Scan
- Phacoemulsifier
- Dietary & Canteen
- Chaplaincy services

== Out -reach services ==
It also provides specialized out reach programmes like:

- Eye camp under the Ophthalmology Department
- School Health programmes,
- Joint Clinic under Orthopedics Department on Every SATURDAYS
- Pregnancy & Neonatal Care clinic under Gynecology Department
- Asthma Clinic under the General Medicine Department
- Diabetic Clinic under the General Medicine Department
- Under five clinics & High Risk Clinic under the Pediatrics Department
- Speech and Hearing clinic under the E N T Department
- Developmental and Rehabilitation clinic
- Adolescent clinic etc.

== Allied institutions ==
- Theophilus College of Nursing
- P. Geevarghese School of Nursing
- School of Medical Laboratory Technology
- Baselios Higher Secondary School
- P G M College
