= Eranattu (Erattu) Kudumbam of Kangazha =

Eranattu (Erattu) is a prominent Nair tharavadu of Kangazha in Kottayam District, Kerala State, India. Tharavadu is a system of joint family practiced by people in Kerala and each Tharavadu has a unique name.

According to known history, Kangazha was once part of the United Kingdom, and was under the control of two Madampaies (Local lords as representatives of the king for the maintenance of law and order as also tax collection) Ranni Kartha and Agasthanathu Nair.

Thekkumkoor was conquered and annexed to Venad by Marthanda Varma towards the end of 18th century. The Madampis were removed from the posts. The king of Venad brought his own loyal people from Ayroor.

A woman from Chelampanethu family was brought in marriage to Madhavakottu family at Kangazha. The progeny of that woman were made the landlords. The entire land from the precincts of Nedumkunnam to Chirakkadavu extending for about 20 km was under this landlord’s control.

This family was later divided into branches or Tharavadus. Kangazha area came under the control of Eranattu and Kadayanickadu under Thayyil Shivashankara Pillai.

Major portion of land in Kadayanickadu, Anikadu, Nedumkunnam and Pulikal Kavala belonged Eranattu family. They had property in Kidangara, Veliyanadu, Kadapra, Muttar, Thalavady etc. Members of this family settled in Kadayanickadu Thayyil, Cheruvally Thekkedathu, Ayirur Chilimpinaethu etc.

Ayyappan Pillai Peshkar of Kanjirappally who maintained accounts and treasury of state for Travancore, brother Govindan Pillai, nephew Arackal Kesava Pillai of Thiruvalla, Arackal Parameswaran Pillai of Kadapra, Kangazha Eranadu Karunakaran Pillai, Kadayanickadu Vakathanath azhathu Kanakku Eswara Pillai Gopala Pillai, Thayyilaya Kaleekal Puthenveettil Kanakku Krishan Pillai, Cheruvally Koonanikkal Kanakku Eswara Pillai etc. belongs to Eranattu family. (Attached supporting document)

Nachinattu Irrigation Project, Alapuzha Market, Munsif Court Changanacherry, and other things were constructed and controlled by Peshkar Ayyappan Pillai.

Branched out after property partition of the Erattu tharavadu to Krishnavilas Bungalow at Kangazha Vazhur, Kanjirapalli of Changanassery taluk.

Due to a social concept called "Marumakkathayam" in Travancore (Kerala), Kanak Keshava Pillai, nephew of Peshkar Ayyappan Pillai inherited all property possessions as a 'Gift Deed' and a part of the ancestral property in Alapuzha, Changassery and Kanjirapalli Sherikkal measuring about 79 acres 20 cents was given on lease to all other weaker sections who undertake cultivation in those landed properties on Pattom (lease of land to cultivate on a compensation to be paid to the landlord)

All the lands were later transferred to Kanak Keshava Pillai's nephew Krishnavilas Ramakrishna Pillai as per Reg No 573 / 1114 Mannar Sub Registrar Office Absolute sale deed made on 30 Edavam 1115 residing at Krishna Vilasom Bungalow, Chooranolil, near Elakkattu of Kangazha.

The lessees became the owners of the property of 9 acres, 36 cents at Kangazha that was on lease for a decade or more, subsequent to revised authority regulations. Sri Ramakrishna Pillai, head of the KrishnaVilas family took his last breath on 18 December 1957 thereby leaving his wife Bhageerathi Pillai Amma and his 8 children. Later, on 30 March 1959, Bhageerathi Amma also followed Ramakrishna Pillai to join hands in heaven leaving their 8 children behind.

During the death of thamburati Bhageerathi Amma, below were the status of their descendants: 1. Gopalakrishnan aged 22 (left tharavadu to seek employment at the age of 18) 2. Saraswati Amma aged 19 3. Sivanunni aged 16 4. Sadasivan aged 13 5. Vijayamma aged 10 6. Madhusudhanan aged 8 7. Radhamani aged 5 8. Radhakrishnan KR aged one

In June 1959, their eldest uncle Prabhakaran Pillai from Kannur reached Kangazha, sold the property for about Rs.4,300 and purchased a property in the name of Saraswathi amma and children at Puzhakkattiri, Angadipuram, Perintalmanna, Palghat District, Kerala; Migration of the Krishnavilas family.
