= Kanam Rajendran =

Indian politician (1950–2023)

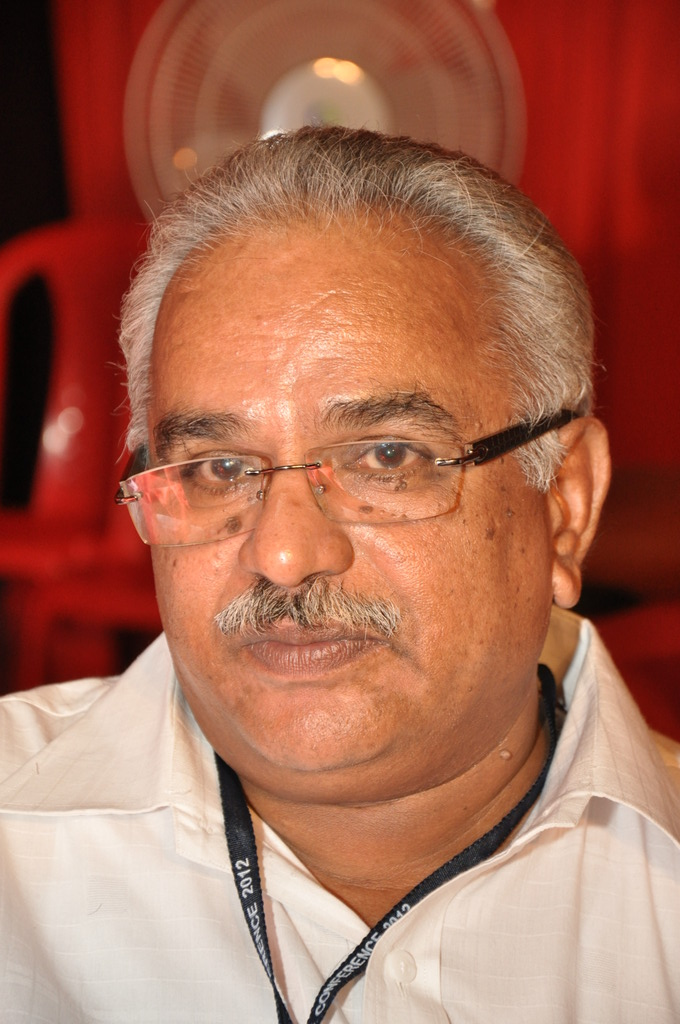

State Secretary of the Communist Party of India, Kerala State Council
- In office 2 March 2015 – 8 December 2023
- Preceded by: Pannyan Raveendran
- Succeeded by: Binoy Viswam

Member of the Kerala Legislative Assembly
- In office 1982 – 1991
- Preceded by: M. K. Joseph
- Succeeded by: K. Narayana Kurup
- Constituency: Vazhoor

Personal details
- Born: 10 November 1950 Kanam, Kottayam, Travancore–Cochin, India
- Died: 8 December 2023 (aged 73) Kochi, Ernakulam, Kerala, India
- Party: Communist Party of India
- Spouse: Vanaja Rajendran
- Children: 2
- Parents: V. K. Parameswaran Nair; Chellamma
- Education: CMS College Kottayam, Baselius College, Kottayam

Kanam Rajendran (10 November 1950 – 8 December 2023) was an Indian politician who was a member of the Communist Party of India. He represented Vazhoor constituency in the Kerala Legislative Assembly from 1982 to 1991. In March 2015, he was elected the Secretary of Communist Party of India Kerala State Council.

Kanam was born in Koottickal, a village in Kottayam district on 10 November 1950. He studied at CMS College Kottayam.

Kanam died on 8 December 2023, at the age of 73. The death happened at Amrita Hospital, Kochi, where he had been undergoing diabetes treatment. He had undergone a foot amputation surgery as part of the treatment. The immediate cause of death was a heart attack. The mortal remains were brought to his native place, and a funeral with full state honours was held at Kanam, Kottayam on 10 December 2023. Many personalities paid their tribute.

== Positions held ==
- Secretary, Communist Party of India (CPI) Kerala State Committee
- Secretary, All India Youth Federation (AIYF) Kerala State Committee
- Secretary, All India Trade Union Congress (AITUC) Kerala State Committee
- Vice President, AIYF National Council
- Member, CPI State Secretariat
- Member, 7th Kerala Legislative Assembly (1982–87)
- Member, 8th Kerala Legislative Assembly (1987–91)
- Chairman, Committee on Government Assurances (1984–87)
