= Rony K Baby =

Indian politician and academic

Rony K. Baby

Member of the Kerala Legislative Assembly
- Incumbent
- Assumed office May 2026
- Preceded by: N. Jayaraj
- Constituency: Kanjirappally

Personal details
- Born: Rony K. Baby; 1977 (age 48–49) Kottayam district, Kerala, India
- Party: Indian National Congress
- Parent: Mathew Joseph (father)
- Education: Post Graduate (MA, B.Ed)
- Alma mater: University of Hyderabad
- Occupation: Assistant Professor, Politician

Rony Kunnel Baby is an Indian politician and academic serving as the member of the legislative assembly (MLA) for the Kanjirappally constituency in the 16th Kerala Assembly. A member of the Indian National Congress, he was elected in the 2026 Kerala Legislative Assembly election, defeating the incumbent representative from the KC(M).

== Early life and education ==
Rony K Baby was born in the Kottayam district of Kerala. He pursued a career in academia after completing his post-graduation and B.Ed. Before entering active electoral politics, he served as an assistant professor. He was an active member of the Kerala Students Union (KSU) and the Indian Youth Congress during his student years.

== Political career ==
In the 2026 Kerala Assembly elections, Rony ran in the election for the Kanjirappally constituency, a seat that had been held by the Kerala Congress (M) for several terms. His campaign focused on the issues of rubber farmers, healthcare infrastructure, and the development of the high-range regions of Kottayam.

Rony polled 56646 votes, and defeated the incumbent MLA N. Jayaraj of the Kerala Congress (M) by a margin of 5772 votes.

== Election results ==
=== 2026 Kerala Legislative Assembly election ===
Party	Candidate	Votes	%	±%
	INC	Rony K Baby	56646	41.66
	KC(M)	N. Jayaraj	50874	37.41
	BJP	George Kurien	26984	19.84
Margin of victory		5772	4.25	
Total valid votes		1,35,988		
INC gain from KC(M)		Swing		
