= Adarsh Alphons =

American entrepreneur, philanthropist and artist

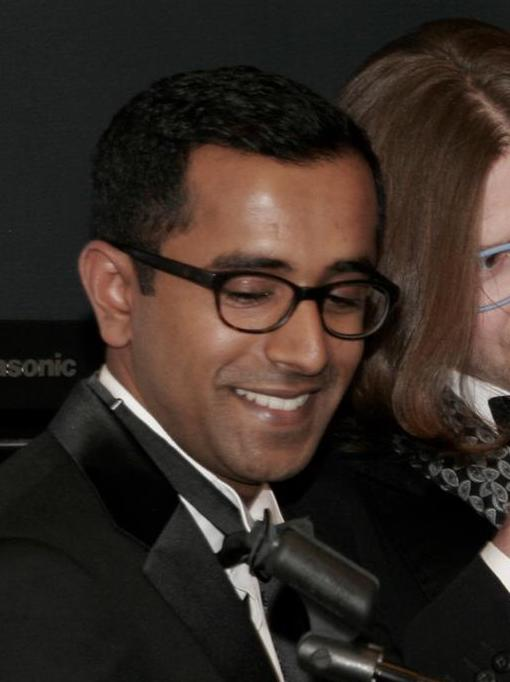
- Born: July 4, 1984 (age 42); Thiruvananthapuram, Kerala
- Occupations: Entrepreneur, Educator, Artist
- Years active: 2011- present
- Known for: Founder at ProjectArt and Founder at Postmoda
- Website: https://projectart.org

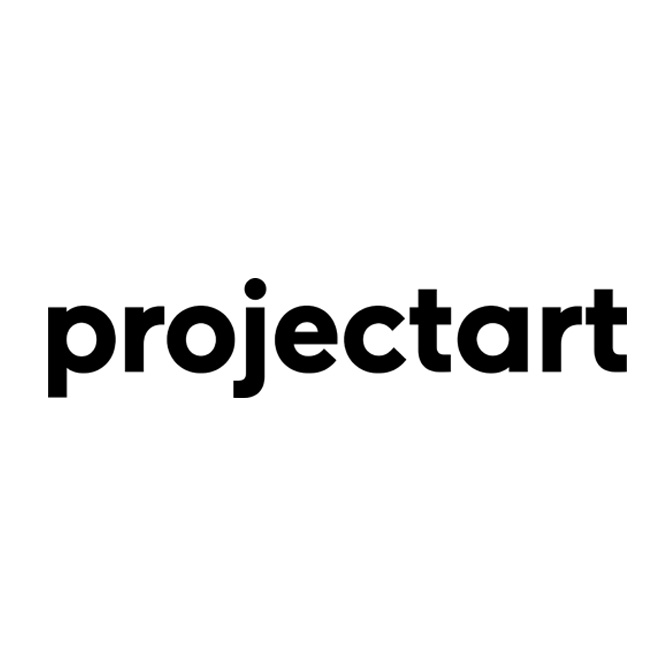
ProjectArt logo

Adarsh Alphons (born July 4, 1984) the founder of ProjectArt, is an American entrepreneur, philanthropist and artist. In addition, he is one of the founders and CEO of Postmoda, a fashion resale marketplace.

== Education ==
Alphons is the son of Alphons Kannanthanam, an Indian politician from Kerala. Alphons got his BFA in 2006 from the Maryland Institute College of Art. Alphons attended Boston University and got his MS in Arts Administration in 2007 from there. In 2014, he was made a Community Scholar at Columbia University, at the conclusion of his time there, he was invited to lecture at the Faculty Hall for their Speaker Series.

== Artist ==
As an artist in 1996, he created "Mother's Golden Hands", a painting he did based on his encounter with Mother Teresa. The painting focuses on her hands rather than her face. The painting was sold in London during Alphons's global exhibition in 1999. He painted another portrait of Mother Teresa called "Bharat's Golden Hands" for Pope John Paul II's visit and Holy Mass in New Delhi. Alphons claimed that art saved his life.

== Philanthropy and awards ==
In 2015, Alphons was listed among 50 Biggest Philanthropists in the World by Town and Country Magazine. In 2015, he was named a CNN Hero. Later that year, he was selected a 40 Under 40 in Art Business the US by Apollo Magazine, and in 2015 he was chosen as a Global 40 Under 40 by that publication. He was made Community Scholar at Columbia University. In 2011, Alphons was featured by NY1 News as the New Yorker of the week.

== ProjectArt ==
In 2011, after previously working as the director of visual arts for the Harlem School of the Arts, Alphons founded ProjectArt, a nonprofit organization that provides exposure to creative exploration to children in high-need areas across the US. Its cost-effective model circumvents traditional operational expenses by partnering with public libraries and utilizing empty spaces in libraries to host classes. As of 2024, its programs are offered in New York City, Miami, Los Angeles, Detroit, Pittsburgh and Cincinnati.

In 2017 ProjectArt launched My Kid Could Do That, a widely-acclaimed exhibition and fundraiser featuring never-seen-before artwork from some of the world’s leading contemporary artists. It held its fourth exhibition in November 2022. Participating artists include Ed Ruscha, Catherine Opie, Kenny Scharf, Rirkrit Tiravanija, Philip Pearlstein, Daniel Arsham, KAWS, Cecily Brown, Sanford Biggers, Matthew Ritchie, Urs Fischer, Olafur Eliasson.

As of 2017, ProjectArt is the largest free art school for children in the US.

== Postmoda ==
Alphons founded Wardrobe in 2019, a peer-to-peer fashion rental startup, which acquired Rent My Wardrobe in 2020 and then pivoted from a peer to peer shopping destination, to Postmoda, a fashion resale marketplace for returned clothing items in 2022. The company saves thousands of tons of returned items that would normally end up as waste in landfills.
