= V. S. Bhaskara Panicker =

A known literary figure of Kottayam, Kerala, V.S. Bhaskara Panicker (1928–2015) was born in Karukachal, a village in Kottayam District, Kerala State, India. He served as the General Secretary of Akhila Bharata Ayyappa Seva Sangham during its early years.

Retired from Department of Posts, Government of India, Mr. Panicker authored more than 400 poems which were published in the leading Malayalam periodicals. A collection of these poems titled "Ee Manninte Geetangal" was later published by Kurukshethra in 2006. Mr. Panicker has also published Shatakas on respectable personalities of India. A treatise on Indian aesthetics comprising Natya Shastra, Nataka Shastra and Kavya Shastra, written by Mr. Panicker was published on the dance portal Narthaki.com. He was the Kottayam District president of Tapasya Kala Sahithya Vedi. Many of his poems published in Kesari Malayalam Weekly are now popular Gangeets of Kerala. He was also the Taluk Sangh Chalak of his district when he died in 2015.

Mr. Panicker had done an extensive study in Indian aesthetics and translated renowned danseuse Mrinalini Sarabhai's book "Understanding Bharatanatyam" into Malayalam.
