= Champakara =

Champakara Sampal kara
- Village
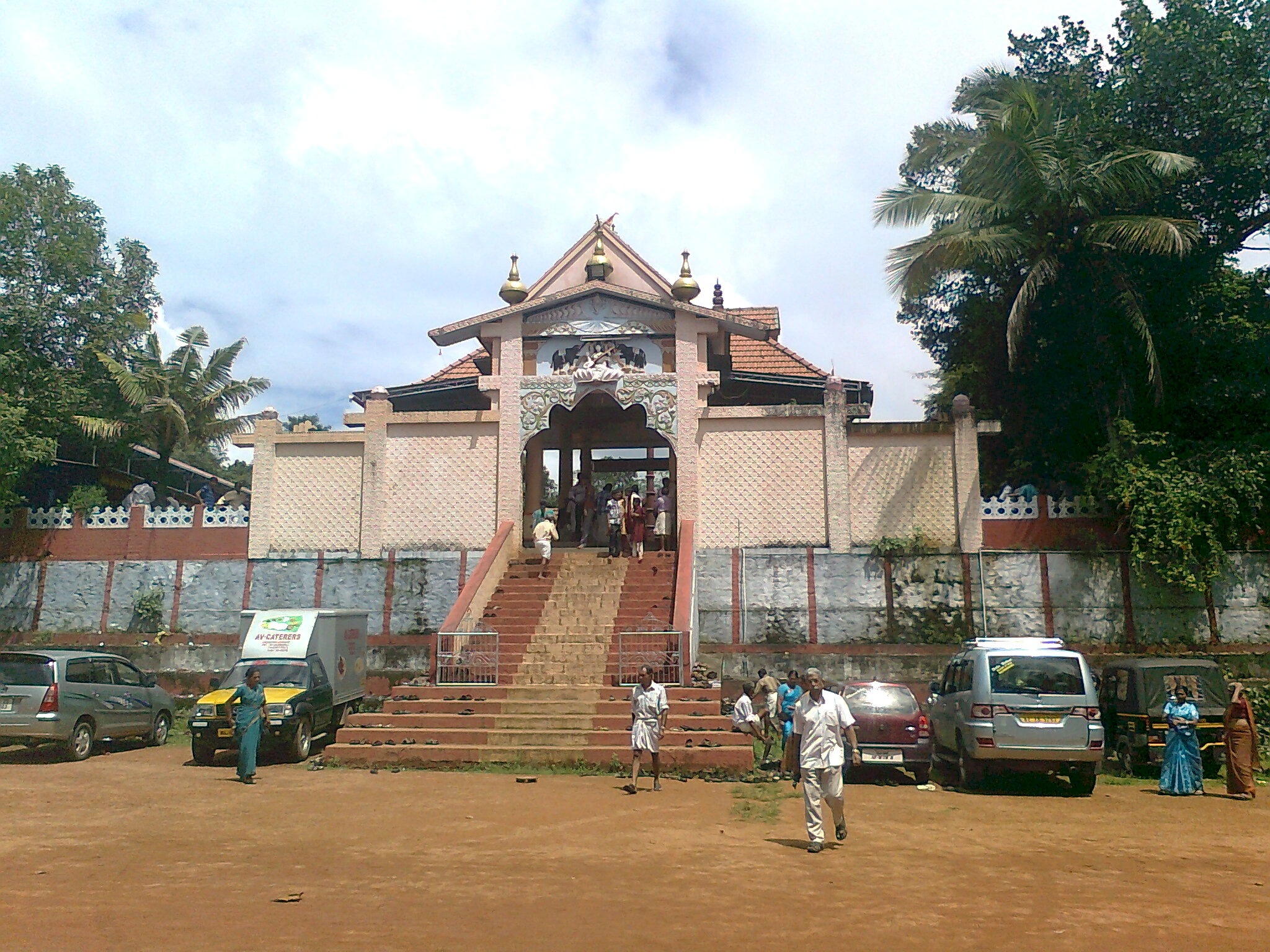
- Champakara Devi Temple

- Location in Kerala, India Champakara (India)
- Coordinates: 9°32′0″N 76°38′0″E
- Country: India
- State: Kerala
- District: Kottayam

Languages
  - Official: Malayalam, English
- Time zone: UTC+5:30 (IST)
- Vehicle registration: KL-

Champakara, Kottayam, Kerala, India, is a village in Kottayam District, 18 kilometres (11 mi) away from Kottayam in India. The State highway from Kottayam to Punaloor passes through the town. The name derived from the Malayalam word Sampal kara, or Sampath kara, which means "the land of prosperity."

== History ==
The "ettuveettil pillaimar," famous in Travancore history, was arrested in Champakkara by the Travancore military and hanged at Vettikkalunku near Vakathanam, six kilometres south of Champakara.

== Martial arts ==
Champakara is the land of Kalaripayattu, the martial art of Kerala. The town is home to Kalari and Ayurvedic centres. Kalaripayattu is said to be one of the oldest martial arts.

== Demographics ==
The people of Champakara are dedicated to worshiping nature, and the forest preserve of Sarpa Kavu is nearby. Sarppakkav is the temple of sarppams (Malayalam) (snakes). The village of Karukachal lies within the town. The postal code of Champakara is 86540.

Hindus, Christians, and a small population of Muslims reside in the village.

== Economy ==
In ancient times, people were focused on agricultural activities. Now, rubber is the main crop. The primary industries providing employment are the Champakara bus service, a match factory, the Sreerangom hospital, metal and wood industries, and a pepper factory.

== Politics ==
Politically, it is an LDF and United Democratic Front dominated society. Rashtriya Swayamsevak Sangh (RSS) is also powerful here. The former transport Minister, Late Prof: K. Narayana Kurup, and the current MLA for Kanjirappalli, Dr. N. Jayaraj, are the notable personalities from here. Champakara falls under the jurisdiction of the Karukachalgram panchayat. The Nair Service Society and SNDP are influential here.

== Religious centres ==
Champakara is a land of communal harmony. The Devi temple Champakara, Devi temple Nethalloor, and the Champakara St. Joseph Syro Malabar Catholic Church are the main worship places. Christmas, Easter, Thrikkarthika, Meenabharani, Sreekrishnajayanthi, and Navarathri are the main religious occasions.

In Devi temples, during the Thrikkarthika and Meenabharani festivals, the Seva and Anpolivazhipadu are very famous all over the country, because it contains a huge number of Para (a vessel used for measurement of paddy) arranged in rows and is the main attraction for pilgrims. The Nethalloor Devi temple holds a festival of lights (Deepam) during Thrikkarthika. On the day of Kumbhabharani in Champakara temple, Pindivillaku, made out of plantain, are lit in the evening.

== Cultural centre and orphanage ==
Ekathmatha Kendrom is the main cultural centre in Champakara. Many cultural activities take place at this facility, including classes for music and dance. Sri Sathyasai Seva Samathi Karukachal has also been in this cultural centre for the last twenty years.

Jyothirmayi Balikasadanam, an orphanage for small girls, is situated near the Nethallor Devi temple.

DITTANIA CHAMPAKARA is a Samskarika Samithi, which conducts several cultural and charitable activities every year. It is located near Champakara Temple.

== Schools and colleges ==
The Government L.P. School Thommachery, the Subhash Memorial U.P. School, the Sarada Vidya Mandirom, St. Joseph U.P school Champakara, and the Rajahamsasramom Vidya Peedom are the major schools. Mahatma Gandhi University's B.Ed. coaching centre near Sreerangom Hospital.

== Tourism ==
Aruvikuzhy Waterfalls, which measures about 30 ft in height and active only during monsoon, is a local tourist attraction, about 16-18 kilometres away from Champakkara.

About 30 kilometres away is Malarikal Sunset viewpoint, which is known for its views of paddy fields filled with red lotus and water lilies from September to November.
