= Thirunal =

Thirunal is a surname. Notable people with the surname include:

- Bharani Thirunal Lakshmi Bayi CI (1848–1901), the Senior Rani of Travancore from 1857 until her death in 1901
- Ayilyam Thirunal (1832–1880), the ruler of the princely state of Travancore in India from 1860 to 1880
- Moolam Thirunal, the ruling Maharajah of the Indian state of Travancore between 1885 and 1924
- Uthradom Thirunal (1814–1860), the Maharajah of Travancore state in southern India
- Uthram Thirunal (1814–1860), the Maharajah of Travancore state in southern India
- Visakham Thirunal (1837–1885), the Maharaja of Travancore from 1880 to 1885
- Anizham Thirunal Marthanda Varma (1706–1758), king of Travancore from 1729 until his death in 1758
- Aswathi Thirunal Rama Varma, South Indian classical musician, a performing vocalist, veena player and writer
- Chithira Thirunal Balarama Varma (1912–1991), the last ruling maharaja of Travancore, in southern India
- Swathi Thirunal Rama Varma (1813–1846), the Maharaja of Travancore in India
- Uthradom Thirunal Marthanda Varma (born 1922), the current titular Maharaja of Travancore

== See also ==
- Sree Chitra Thirunal College of Engineering, state-government engineering college in Thiruvananthapuram, Kerala, India
- Swathi Thirunal College of Music, music college in Thiruvananthapuram, Kerala, India
- Sree Chitra Thirunal Institute of Medical Sciences and Technology (SCTIMST), Thiruvananthapuram (Trivandrum), India established in 1974
- Kodiyettru Thirunal, the festival celebrated in Swamithoppepathi for eleven days by the followers of the Ayyavazhi
- Swathi Thirunal (film) Special Jury Award - Lenin Rajendran Best Play Back Singer - M. Balamuralikrishna Best Art Director
- Uzhavar thirunal or Thai Pongal, thanksgiving festival at the end harvest season
- Thirunallar
- Thirunallur
