= Nethalloor Devi Temple =

Nethalloor Sri Bhagavathi Temple
- നെത്തല്ലൂർ ശ്രീ ഭഗവതി ക്ഷേത്രം
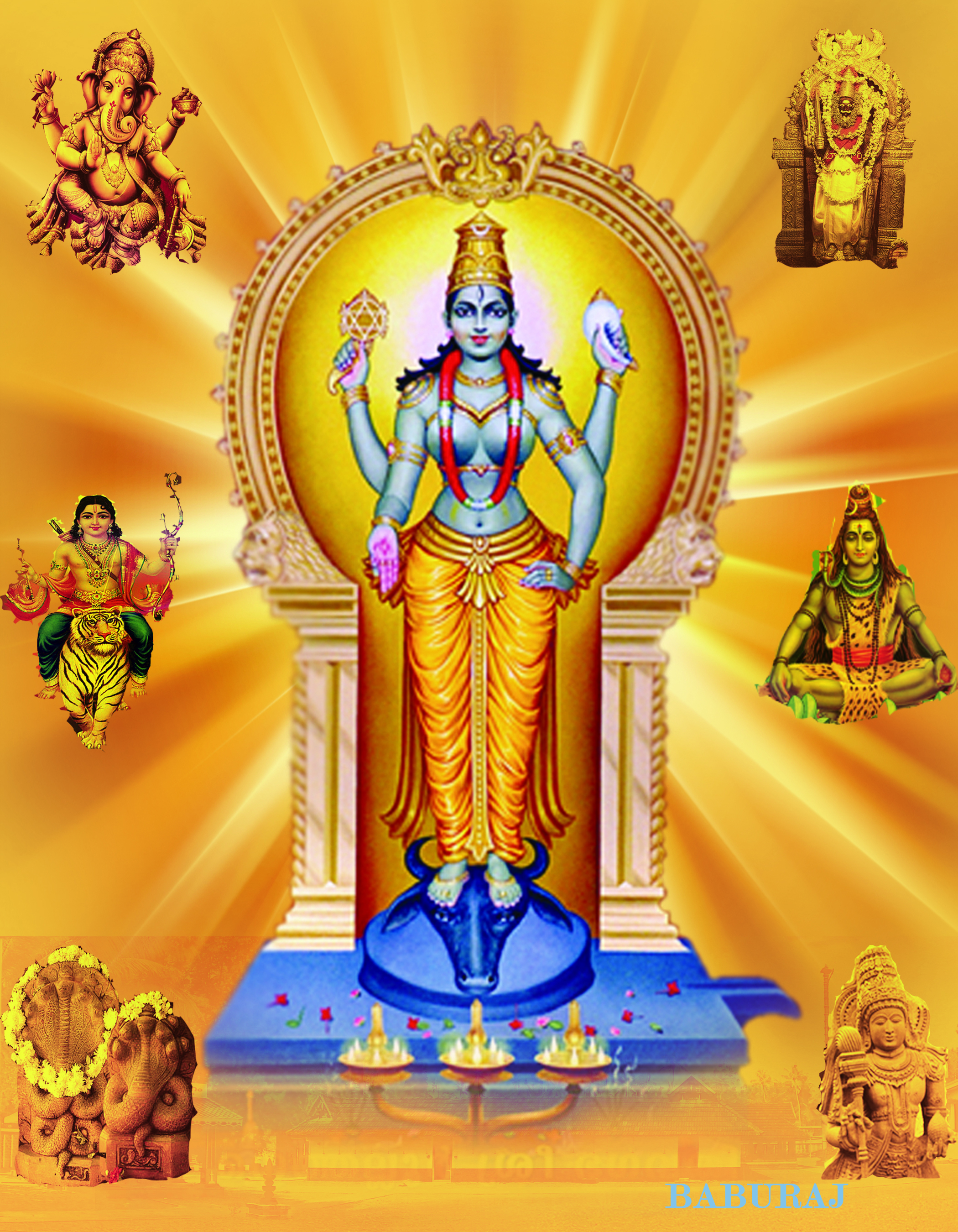
- Nethalloor Sri Bhagavathi

- Nethalloor Sri Bhagavathy Temple, Karukachal, Kottayam, Kerala

Religion
- Affiliation: Hinduism
- District: Kottayam
- Deity: Durga
- Festival: Thrikarthika mahothsavam

Location
- Location: Karukachal
- State: Kerala
- Country: India
- Interactive map of Nethalloor Sri Bhagavathi Temple
- Coordinates: 9°30′49.3″N 76°38′18.0″E

Architecture
- Type: Traditional Kerala style

Specifications
- Temple: One
- Elevation: 53.09 m (174 ft)

The Nethalloor Sri Bhagavathi temple is located near Karukachal, in the district of Kottayam, Kerala state, India. Changanasserry-vazhoor & Kottayam-Punalur state highways meet in Nethalloor junction; 19 km from Kottayam in Karukachal route and 16 km from Changanasserry in Vazhoor route.

This is one of the famous Durga Bhagavathi shrines in Kerala. The prathikshta of Bhagavathi durga is in the bhava of Mahishasuramardini. It is one of the beautiful "chathurbahu" Bhagavathi "prathishta" in Kerala.

The main festival of this temple is "Thrikkarthika maholsavam" in the month of " vrischikam"(nov-dec)and the other one is "navarathri".

Sri Paramboor illathu Neela kandan bhattathirippadu is the chief priest(Thanthri) of this temple and Champakara NSS karayogom is taking care of this temple.
