= Mathew Cheriankunnel =

Indian bishop (1930–2022)

His Excellency Mathew Cheriankunnel
- Bishop Emeritus of Kurnool
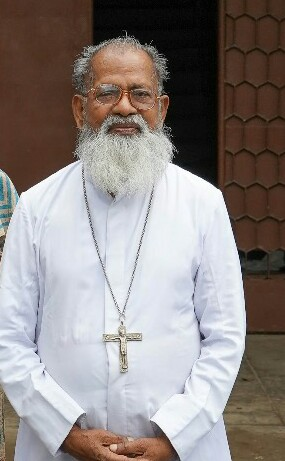
- Church: Roman Catholic Church
- See: Catholic Diocese of Kurnool
- Installed: 18 January 1988
- Term ended: 16 July 1991
- Predecessor: Joseph Rajappa
- Successor: Abraham Aruliah Somavarapa
- Previous post: Bishop of Nalgonda (1976–1986)

Orders
- Ordination: 28 April 1962
- Consecration: 3 May 1977 by Duraisamy Simon Lourdusamy

Personal details
- Born: 23 September 1930 Kadayanickadu, British Raj
- Died: 22 March 2022 (aged 91) Eluru, India

Mathew Cheriankunnel (23 September 1930 – 30 March 2022) was an Indian Roman Catholic prelate, who served as a bishop of the Roman Catholic Diocese of Kurnool.

== Biography ==
Born on 23 September 1930 in Kadayanickadu, British Raj, he was ordained priest of the Pontifical Institute for Foreign Missions on 28 April 1962. He was appointed the first bishop of Nalgonda on 31 May 1976, and received his episcopal consecration on 3 May 1977, from Cardinal Duraisamy Simon Lourdusamy. He was appointed coadjutor bishop of Catholic Diocese of Kurnool on 22 December 1986, succeeding on 18 January 1988. He left the diocese government on 16 July 1991. Cheriankunnel died on 30 March 2022, at the age of 91.

Catholic Church titles
Preceded by Joseph Rajappa	Bishop of Kurnool; 1988–1991	Succeeded by Abraham Aruliah Somavarapa
Preceded by Post created	Bishop of Nalgonda; 1976–1986	Succeeded by Innayya Chinna Addagatla
