= Vellala =

- village
- Interactive map of Vellala
- Location in Andhra Pradesh, India Vellala (India)
- Coordinates: 14.932221°N 78.535616°E
- Country: India
- State: Andhra Pradesh
- District: Kadapa
- Mandal: Rajupalem
- Gram Panchayat: Kummarapalli

Languages
  - Official: Telugu
- Time zone: UTC+5:30 (IST)
- Vehicle registration: AP

Vellala is a small village in the state of Andhra Pradesh, India. It is near the town of Proddutur in the Kadapa District. The village got its name from the locally famous "Vellala Sanjevaraswami ", a temple dedicated to Lord Hanuman. This temple is at the place where Lord Hanuman stopped for some water while flying to Lanka carrying the Sanjivani mountain.
