= N. Jayaraj =

Indian politician

Dr. N. Jayaraj

Chief Whip of the Kerala Legislative Assembly
- In office 3 June 2021 – 23 May 2026
- Preceded by: K. Rajan
- Succeeded by: Apu John Joseph

Member of the Kerala Legislative Assembly
- In office 1 June 2011 – 21 May 2026
- Preceded by: Alphons Kannanthanam
- Constituency: Kanjirappally

Personal details
- Born: 1 January 1956 (age 70)
- Party: Kerala Congress (M)
- Spouse: S. Geetha
- Children: One daughter
- Parent(s): K. Narayana Kurup; K. Leela Devi

Dr. Narayana Kurup Jayaraj (Malayalam: എന്‍. ജയരാജ്‌‌) (born 1 January 1956) is an Indian politician and former Chief Whip and MLA representing KCM. Son of Shri K. Narayana Kurup and Smt. K. Leela, Dr. N. Jayaraj was a member of the state committee of Kerala Youth Front (M). He is also a founding member of Sanskruti, a movement for the cultural development of the Vazhoor locality.

He is awarded Ph.D. from Kerala University on the topic "Revenue Expenditure Pattern and its Implication on Economic Development of Kerala". He is a retired college lecturer from NSS Hindu College Perunna. He was a member of Kottayam district panchayat twice before getting elected to Kerala Legislative Assembly. An active participant in environmental issues and General Editor of 'Ela', an Environment Magazine, he is the founder of 'Ente Manimalayar'- an organisation for conservation of Manimalayar.
