= Thirunallur =

Thirunallur may refer to one of several villages in Tamil Nadu, India:

- Thirunallur, Annavasal, Pudukkottai
- Thirunallur, Aranthangi, Pudukkottai
- Thirunallur, Thanjavur
