= Elappunkal =

- Village
- Location in Kerala, India Elappunkal (India)
- Coordinates: 9.7°N 76.78°E
- Country: India
- State: Kerala
- District: Kottayam district
- Taluk: Meenachil

Languages
  - Official: Malayalam, English
- Time zone: UTC+5:30 (IST)
- PIN: 686579
- Telephone code: 04828
- Vehicle registration: KL-35
- Nearest city: Kottayam
- Lok Sabha constituency: Kottayam
- Vidhan Sabha constituency: Pala

Elappunkal is a village close to Erattupetta in the Kottayam district of Kerala state in India. It is situated on the Erattupetta–Thodupuzha state highway route.

The Meenachil river flows by one side of the village. Elappunkal's primary exports are rubber and most of its inhabitants are farmers. The main religions are Hinduism and Islam.

Elappunkal consists of the 5th and 6th wards of Thappulam Panchayath, and falls under the Pala assembly constituency and the Kottayam Parliament constituency.

== History ==
Elappunkal was earlier known as Ilappunkal and Kottakuzi, which means 'the place around a fort' ('kotta' meaning fort in Malayalam). In 1100 AD, the Kingdom of Vempolinad had split into the kingdoms of Thekkumkur and Vadakkumkur. At that time, the kotta separated the two kingdoms.
