= Alphons Kannanthanam =

Indian politician

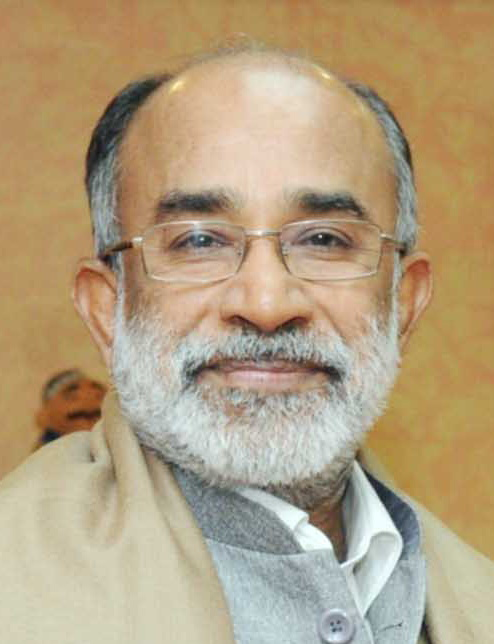

Minister of State for Electronics and Information Technology
- In office 3 September 2017 – 24 May 2019
- Prime Minister: Narendra Modi
- Preceded by: P. P. Chaudhary

Minister of State (Independent Charge) Tourism
- In office 3 September 2017 – 24 May 2019
- Prime Minister: Narendra Modi
- Preceded by: Mahesh Sharma
- Succeeded by: Prahlad Singh Patel

Member of Parliament, Rajya Sabha
- In office 9 November 2017 – 4 July 2022
- Preceded by: Venkaiah Naidu
- Succeeded by: Ghanshyam Tiwari
- Constituency: Rajasthan

Member of Kerala Legislative Assembly
- In office 11 May 2006 – 13 May 2011
- Preceded by: George J. Mathew
- Succeeded by: N. Jayaraj
- Constituency: Kanjirappally

Personal details
- Born: 8 August 1953 (age 73) Manimala, Travancore-Cochin, India
- Party: Bharatiya Janata Party (2011-present)
- Other political affiliations: Independent (2006-2011) (Supported by LDF)
- Spouse: Sheela
- Children: 2 sons (Akash Alphons & Adarsh Alphons)
- Education: North-Eastern Hill University, Shillong
- Website: www.alphonskannanthanam.com

Alphons Joseph Kannanthanam or K. J. Alphons (born 8 August 1953) is an Indian civil servant, advocate, and a BJP politician from Kerala. He was Union Minister of State for Culture, and Tourism during first Modi ministry under Government of Narendra Modi. He also held charge for Electronics and Information Technology.

Alphons Kannanthanam belongs to the 1979 batch of the Indian Administrative Service (I.A.S.), Kerala cadre. He served as Commissioner of the Delhi Development Authority.

He joined the Bharatiya Janata Party in 2012. Before that, he was an independent politician and served as an independent MLA in the Government of Kerala supported by then ruled LDF Alliance.

== Early life and education ==
Alphons was born in Manimala, Kottayam District, to Brijith and K. V Joseph of the Kannanthanam family. His father served World War II and later became a school teacher. Alphons has eleven siblings, including two adopted.

Alphons received his early education in Malayalam medium village schools near his place of birth. He passed SSLC with 42% marks. He completed his Master's in Economics and was one of the toppers of the Civil Services Examination in the year 1979. He also completed his LLB (from Law Centre-2 , Faculty of Law, University of Delhi) while he was the Commissioner for Delhi Development Authority DDA.

== Career ==
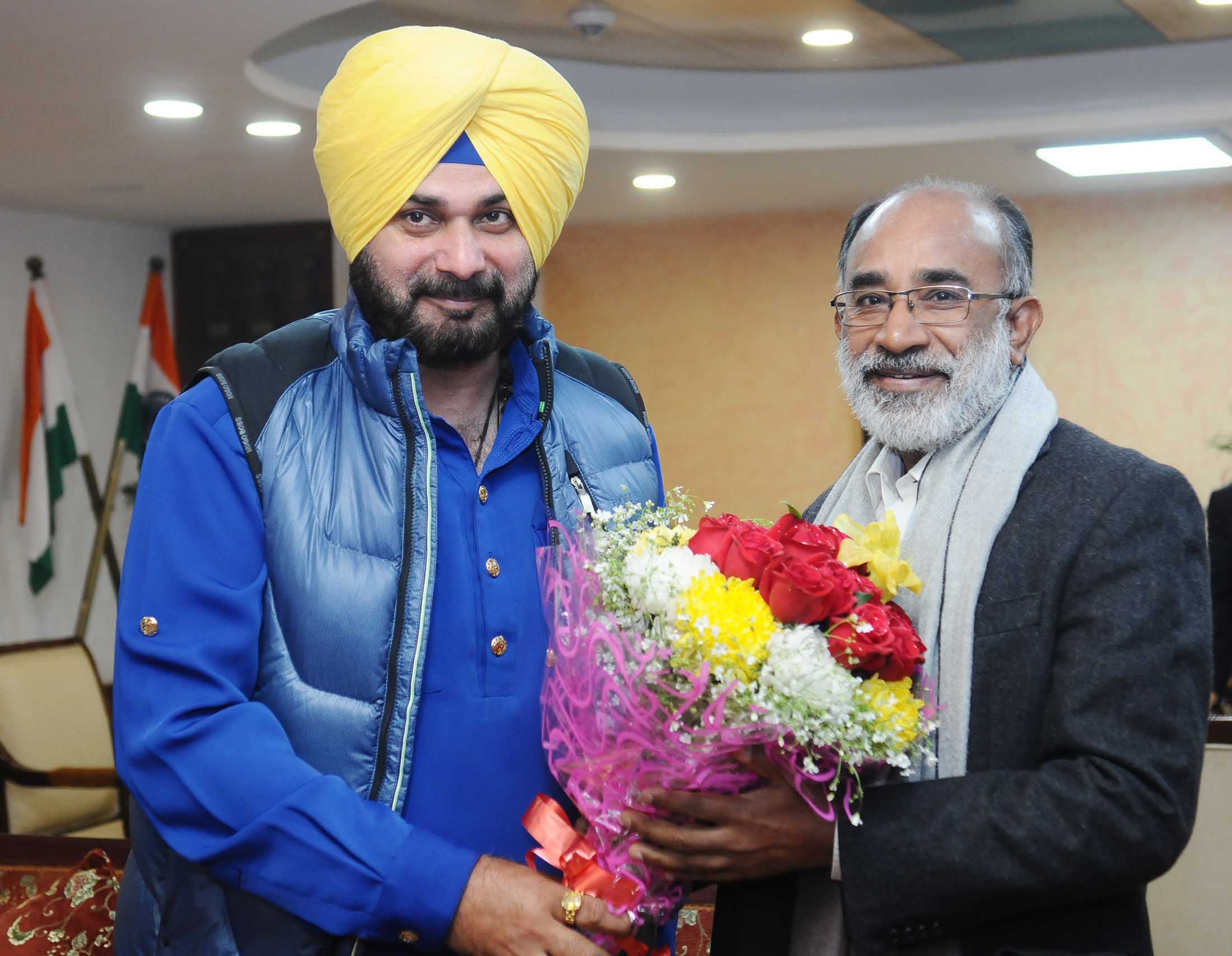
Alphons with Navjot Singh Sidhu

Alphons Kannanthanam was recruited to the Indian Administrative Service in 1979 and served as a civil servant for 27 years.

In the 1980s Kannanthanam was a district collector in Kottayam. His national profile rose as the Commissioner of the Delhi Development Authority, he commissioned demolition of 14,310 illegal buildings and reclaimed land worth more than Rs. 10,000 crores. These actions earned him the epithet 'The Demolition Man'.

He is also a practicing advocate in the High Court of Kerała at Kochi and the Supreme Court of India.

In 2006, he resigned from the IAS to enter politics. He was elected a Member of the Legislative Assembly, from Kanjirappally in Kottayam District, Kerala as an independent candidate with the support of Left Democratic Front and served from 2006 to 2011.

On 24 March 2011, Kannanthanam joined the BJP in the presence of erstwhile party president Nitin Gadkari, after having resigned from his assembly seat a couple of hours prior. He was appointed a Member of Committee constituted by Government of India on 26 June 2017 to prepare the final draft of National Education Policy.

In a cabinet reshuffle on 3 September 2017, he was appointed minister of state in the Ministry of Electronics and Information Technology and minister of State (independent charge) of the Ministry of Tourism. On 9 November 2017, Alphons was elected unopposed as Rajya Sabha member from Rajasthan.

Alphons Kannanthanam is the second BJP Central Minister from Kerala after O. Rajagopal.

=== 2019 Indian general election ===
Alphons Kannanthanam contested as NDA candidate from Ernakulam constituency for 2019 Indian general election and came third.
