= Vaipur =

Vaipur വായ്പ്പൂര്
- town
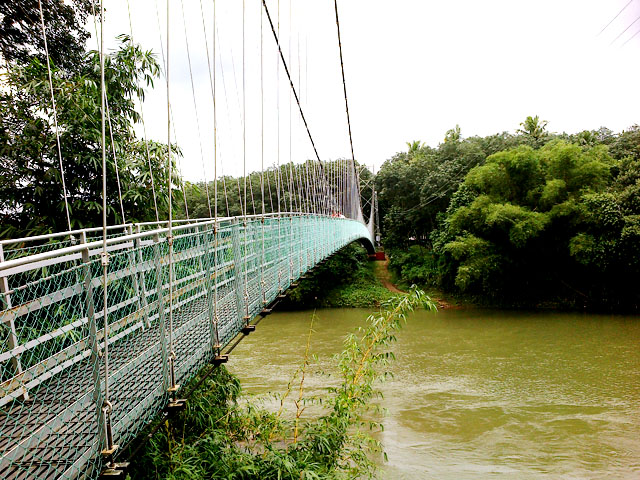
- Hanging Bridge, Vaipur
- Interactive map of Vaipur
- Coordinates: 9°26′50″N 76°42′25″E
- Country: India
- State: Kerala
- District: Pathanamthitta

Languages
  - Official: Malayalam, English
- Time zone: UTC+5:30 (IST)
- PIN: 689588
- Telephone code: 0469
- Vehicle registration: KL - 28
- Nearest city: Thiruvalla
- Literacy: 99.99%
- Lok Sabha constituency: Pathanamthitta

Vaipur is a village located on the banks of the Manimala River, in the Pathanamthitta District of Kerala, India. It is part of the Ranni constituency.It comes under Thiruvalla Revenue Division.
