= Kangazha =

- Village
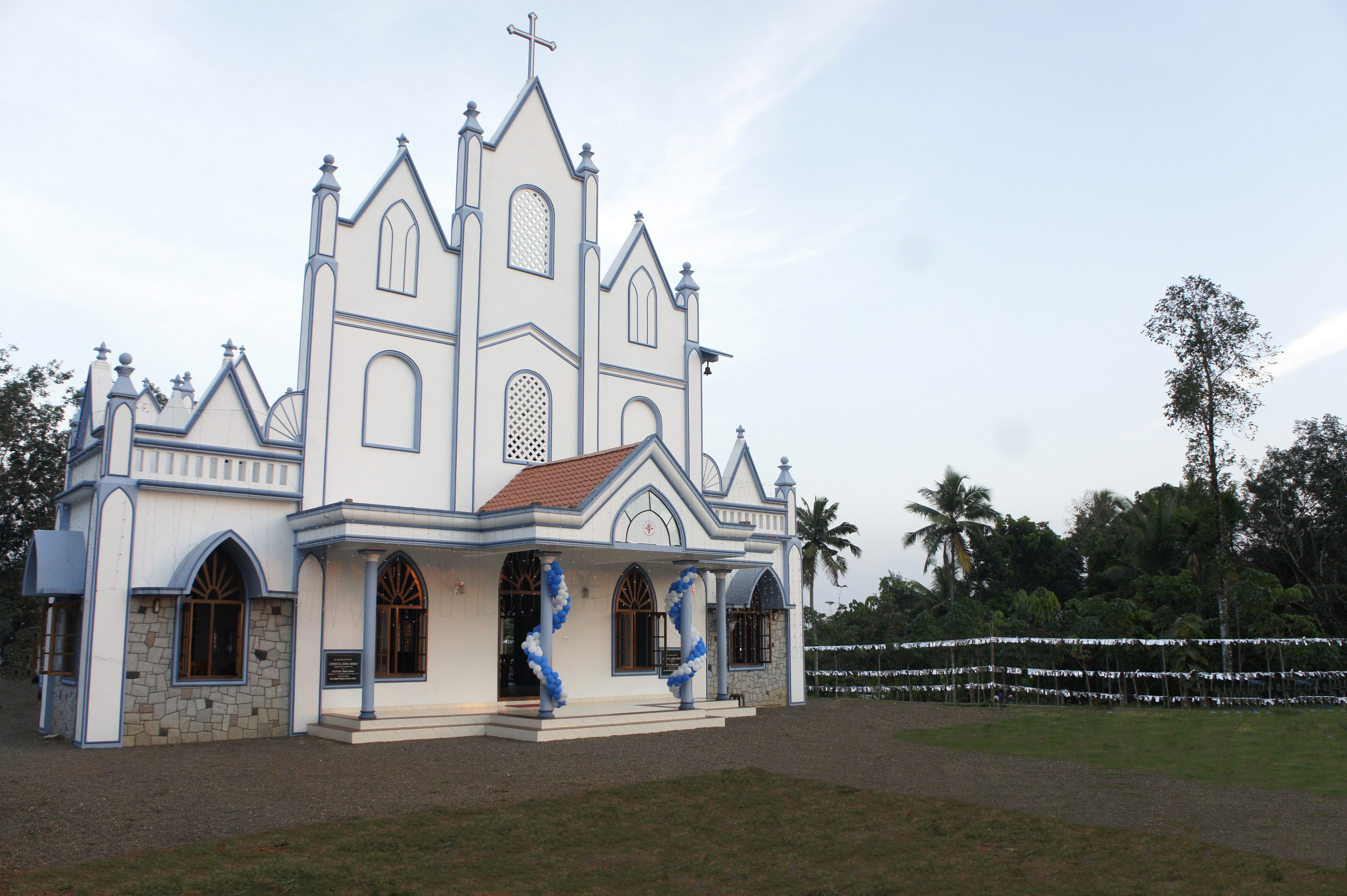
- St.Peter's Church
- Interactive map of Kangazha
- Coordinates: 9.550°N 76.718°E
- Country: India
- State: Kerala
- District: Kottayam

Government
  - Type: Panchayath
  - Body: Kangazha grama panchayath

Area
  - Total: 31.19 km^{2} (12.04 sq mi)
- Elevation: 81 m (266 ft)

Population (2001)
  - Total: 18,644
  - Density: 597.8/km^{2} (1,548/sq mi)

Languages
  - Official: Malayalam, English
- Time zone: UTC+5:30 (IST)
- PIN: 686541(pathanadu po),686555(kanjirappara)
- Telephone code: 0481
- Vehicle registration: KL-33
- Literacy: 96%
- Website: http://lsgkerala.in/kangazhapanchayat

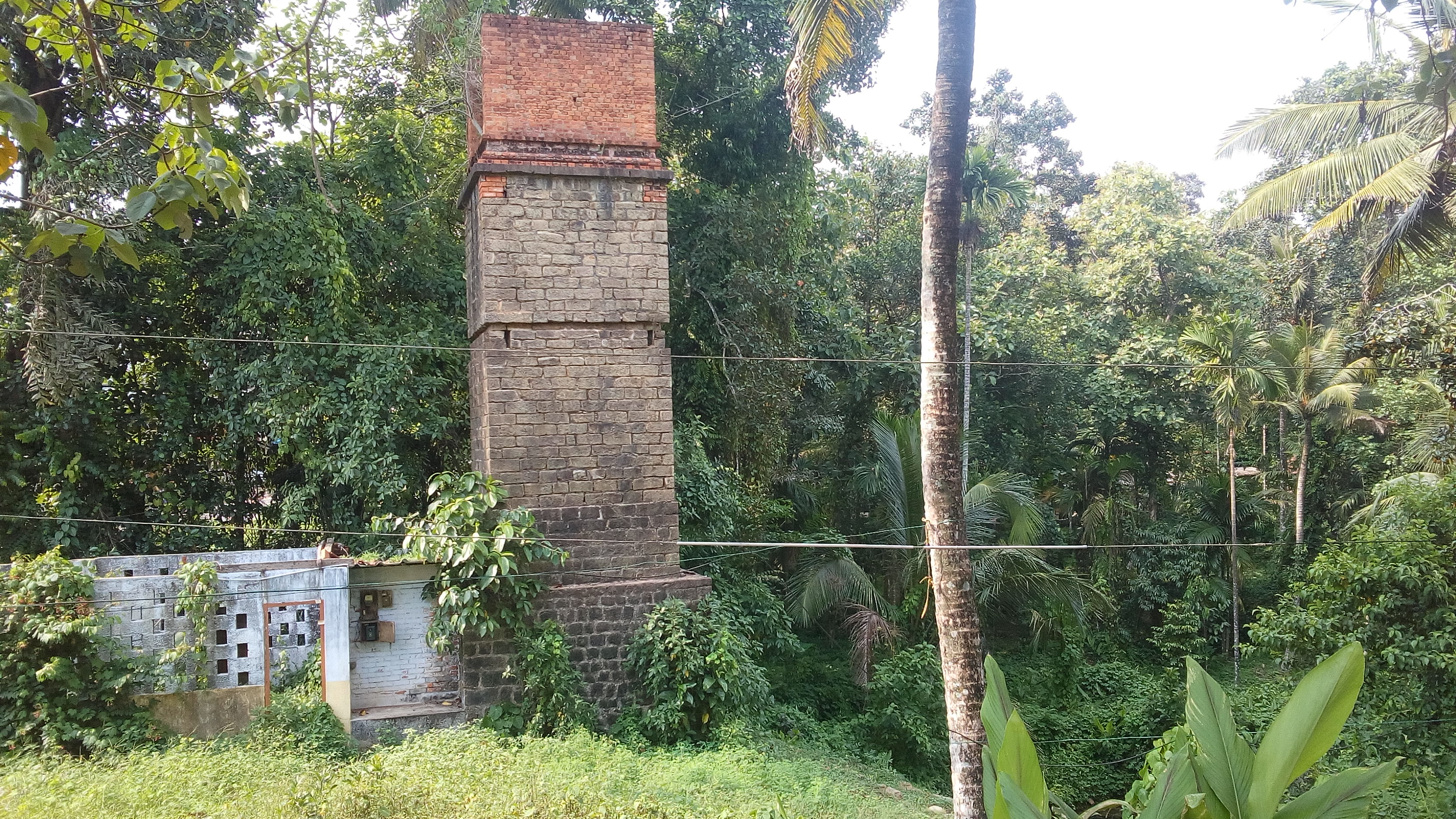
Pillar of Kangazha

Kangazha is a panchayath and village in the Changanacherry Taluk of the Kottayam District of Kerala State in India. It is located 21 kilometers east of Kottayam and 10 kilometers north of Karukachal. It lies midway between the backwaters of Western Kerala and the misty mountains of the Western Ghats.

== Adjacent areas ==
- West - Nedumkunnam
- North - Pampady
- East - vellavoor and Cheruvally
- South - Ezhumattoor and vaipur

The nearest railway stations are Kottayam (21 km) and Changanacherry (22 km), and the nearest airport is Cochin Airport (Nedumbasserry), about 100 km away. Kangazha is on the Changanassery-Vazhoor state highway, which joins Kottayam-Kumaly NH at Pulickalkavala on the north side and on the Karukachal-Manimala road on the east side.

== Etymology ==
Kanva, the father of Shakuntala had visited Kangazha and he stoned the Sivalinga in Kangazha. And thus the term Kanvaya which was referred to point this incident become the name of this village and later Kanvaya had reestablished as Kangazha.

Kangazha Mahadeva Temple (Temple of Lord Shiva) Pathanadu Kavu Bhagawati Temple Elamkavu Sri Bhadrakali Temple Uma-Maheswar Temple, Edayarikapuzha

== Places of worship ==
- St. Thomas Orthodox Church (Kangazha pally)
- Kangazha Mahadeva (Lord Shiva) Temple
- Pathanadu Kavu Bhagawati Temple
- Bethel gospel Assembly church Anchani
- Elamkavu Sri Bhadrakali Temple
- Edayarikkapuzha Uma-Maheswara Temple
- The Pentecostal Mission (TPM) Church, Mundathanam
- Town Masjid Pathanadu, (Managed by kangazha puthoorpally juma-ath)
- Kangazha St Lazarus Orthodox Old Chapel.
- St Antony's Catholic Church, Mundathanam
- St John's Orthodox Church, Mundathanam
- St Peter's C.S.I Church, Kangazha - The first Christian church in Kangazha (Estd.1864)
- Puthoorppally Juma-Masjid, Kangazha
- Salvation Army Church, Edayappara
- St George chapel, cheeramattom
- St. Andrew's C.S.I Church Mundathanm
- IPC Church Mundathanam
- Sharon Fellowship Mundathanam
- Church Of God Mundathanam

== Economy ==
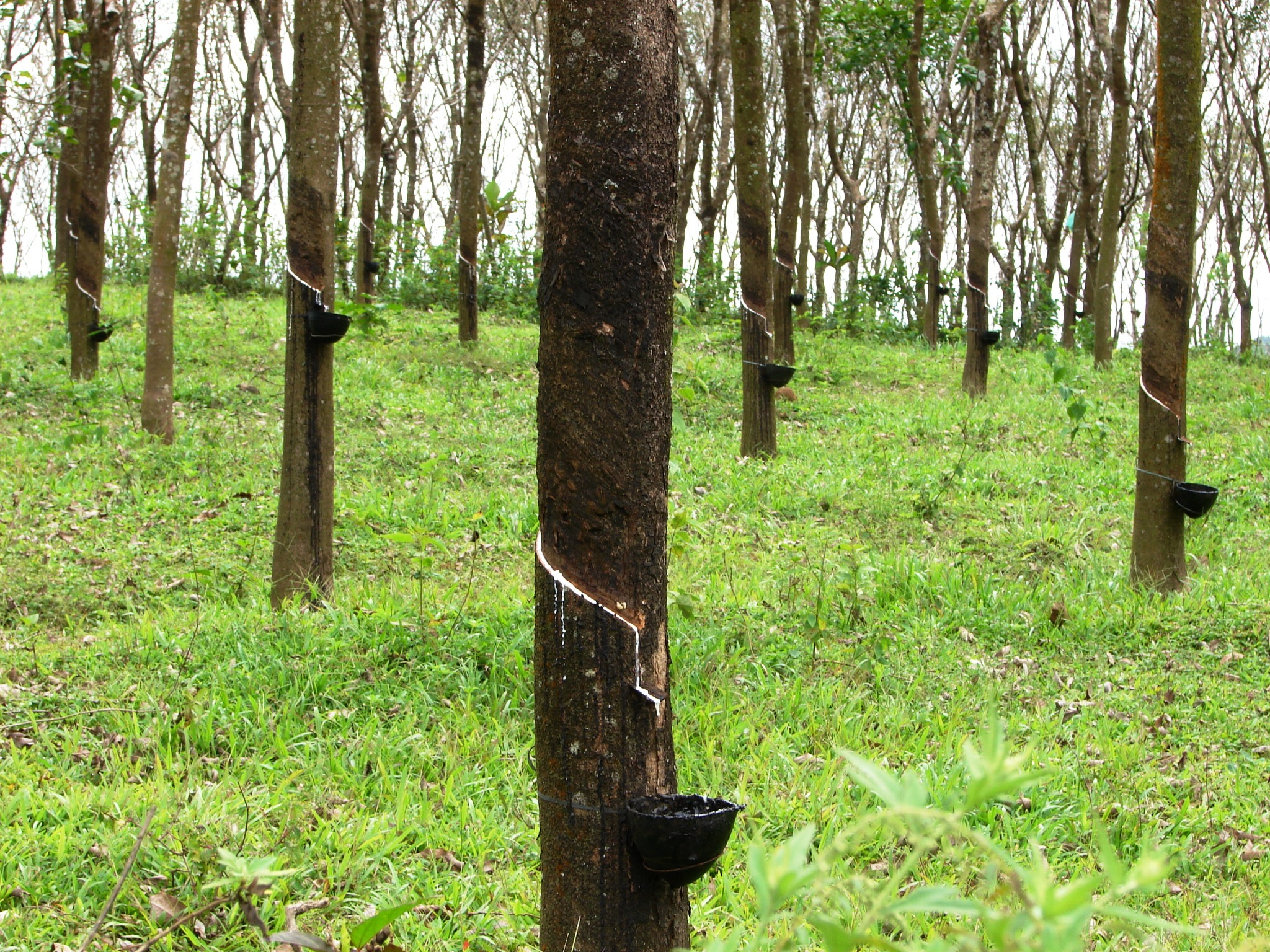
Rubber trees in a plantation

The economy of Kangazha is primarily from agriculture. Kangazha is one of the rubber producing villages in Kerala because the hilly terrain, high humidity and good rain make it suitable for rubber cultivation. Other major crops are coconut, tapioca and pepper. NRIs are also another major source of income.
