= Vellavoor =

- village
- Location in Kerala, India Vellavoor (India)
- Coordinates: 9.4959200°N 76.7264020°E
- Country: India
- State: Kerala
- District: Kottayam

Government
  - Type: Panchayati raj (India)
  - Body: Gram panchayat

Population (2011)
  - Total: 17,150

Languages
  - Official: Malayalam, English
- Time zone: UTC+5:30 (IST)
- Vehicle registration: KL-

Vellavoor is a village in Kottayam district in the state of Kerala, India.

== Demographics ==
As of 2011 India census, Vellavoor had a population of 17150 with 8351 males and 8799 females.
