= Karukachal =

- Town
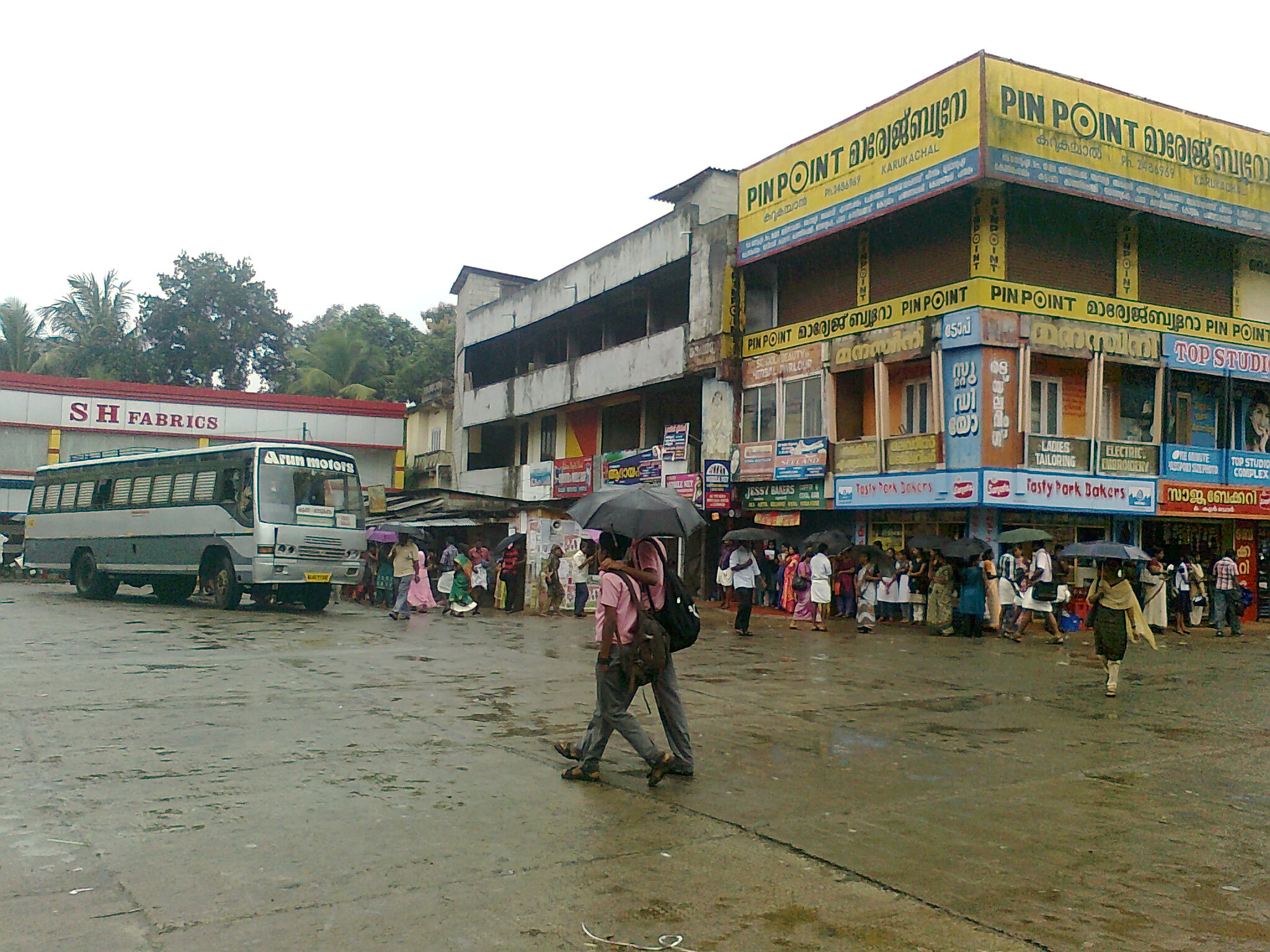
- Karukachal bus station

- Location in Kerala, India Karukachal (India)
- Coordinates: 9°30′6.184″N 76°38′24.422″E
- Country: India
- State: Kerala
- District: Kottayam
- Panchayath: Karukachal

Government
  - Type: Panchayath

Area
  - Total: 22.4 km^{2} (8.6 sq mi)
- Elevation: 81 m (266 ft)

Population
  - Total: 20,133
  - Density: 899/km^{2} (2,330/sq mi)

Languages
  - Official: Malayalam, English
- Time zone: UTC+5:30 (IST)
- PIN: 686540
- Telephone code: +91- 0481
- Vehicle registration: KL -33, KL-05
- Website: lsgkerala.in/karukachalpanchayat/

Karukachal is a fast-growing town in Changanassery Taluk in Kottayam district of Kerala state in India. The name "Karukachal" was coined from the words "Karuka"(Karukapullu in Malayalam) which is a type of grass which grew in plenty and "chal" meaning a small body of flowing water. Karukachal in Changanacherry-Vazhoor Road which is almost a century old. The next nearest town, Chanaganasserry, is 14 km (8.7 mi) & Kottayam is 20 km from Karukachal.

== Schools and Colleges ==
- NSS Higher Secondary School karukachal
- Subhash Memorial U P School Champakara
- Sarada Vidya Mandiram Champakara
- Rajahamsasrama VidhyaPeedom
- St Joseph's U.P School Champakara
- L P School Panayampala
- CMS High School, Nedungadappally
- CMSLPS, Nedungadappally
- St. Philominas, Nedungadappally

== Hospitals ==
1. Government Hospital (PH Centre)
2. NSS Hospital
3. Mercy Nursing Home
4. Royal Med Care Centre

== Religion ==
Hindus and Christians constitute majority of the population with a minority of Muslims.

== Places of Worship ==
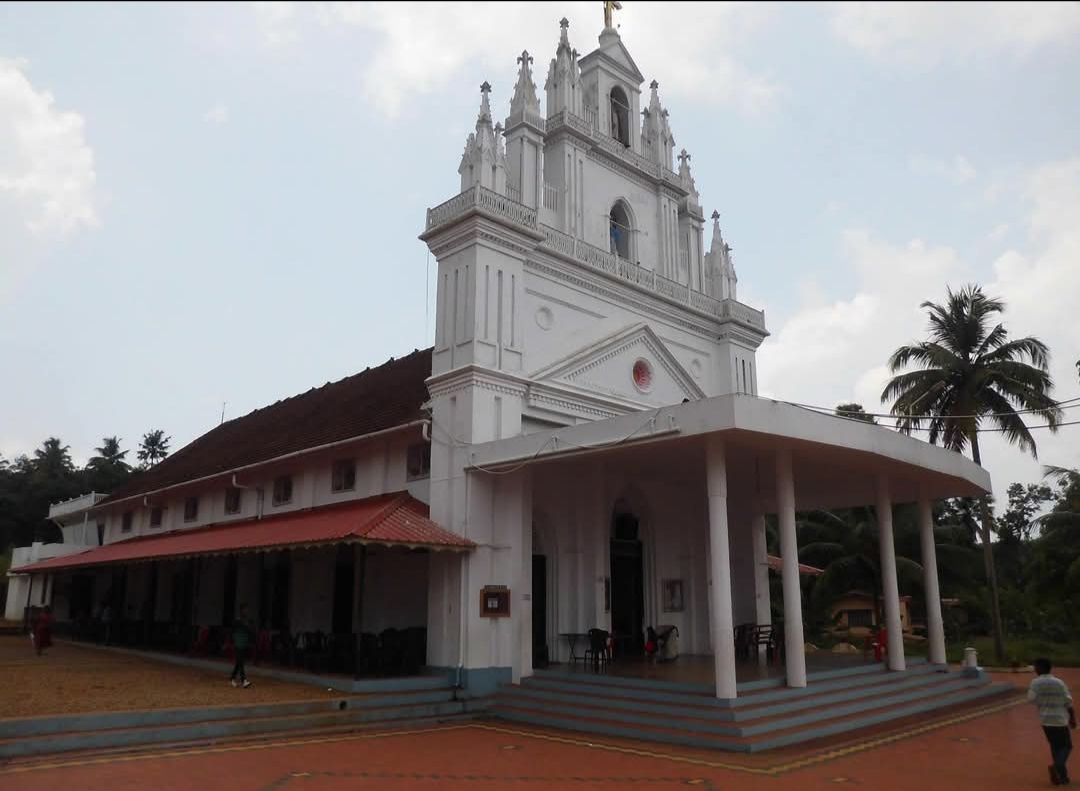
The most prominent church in Karukachal is St Mary's Catholic Church, Koothrapally

There are many churches in Karukachal, mainly being :-

1. St. Mary's Catholic Church Koothrappally (Muthappan Pally)
2. Grace Point Community Church
3. Panayampala St Mary's Orthodox
4. Syrian Church, Panayampala
5. St.Stephen's Orthodox Syrian Church
6. St.Mary's Orthodox Church Elavumkal
7. St. George's Malankara Catholic Church
8. St. Joseph's church Champakara
9. Jerusalem Marthoma Church
10. St. Thomas Marthoma Church in Kottayam Road

There are a number of temples in Karukachal. Nethalloor Devi Temple in Kottayam Road, Sree Mahadeva Temple, Vettikavumkal Junction and Ayyappa Temple in Central Junction are the main temples in Karukachal. There is a mosque on Changanacherry road in the center of Karukachal Town.

== Administration ==
Karukachal is part of Kanjirappally Constituency for Kerala Legislative Assembly Elections and part of Pathanamthitta (Lok Sabha constituency) for Indian General Elections. N. Jayaraj (LDF, Kerala Congress) is the sitting MLA. Anto Antony of INC is the MP representing Mundakayam.

== Transportation ==
- Bus

Round-the-clock bus services connect Karukachal to Kozhencherry, Ranny, Changanassery, Erumely, Kottayam, etc. One of the State Highways (SH-09) connecting Kottayam and Pathanamthitta districts from Kanjikuzhy to Kozhencherry pass through Karukachal and is the most frequent bus route.

- Train

The nearest train station is the Changanassery railway station. The nearest major railway station is Kottayam railway station, which is about 20 km away.

- Airport

The nearest airport is Kochi International Airport (COK), which is about 70 km away.

== Notable people ==
- Kottayam Nazeer (Actor)
