= Vazhoor =

Vazhoor Vazhoor
- Town
- Location in Kerala, India Vazhoor (India)
- Coordinates: 9.564020°N 76.706030°E
- Country: India
- State: Kerala
- District: Kottayam

Government
  - Body: Vazhoor Panchayath
- Elevation: 90 m (300 ft)

Population (2011)
  - Total: 22,982

Languages
  - Official: Malayalam, English
- Time zone: UTC+5:30 (IST)
- PIN: 686504
- Telephone code: 0481
- Vehicle registration: KL-33
- Nearest city: Kottayam
- Lok Sabha constituency: Pathanamthitta
- Vidhan Sabha constituency: Kanjirappally (erstwhile Vazhoor)
- Civic agency: Vazhoor Panchayath
- Climate: humid tropical (Köppen)

Vazhoor is a town in Kottayam district in the state of Kerala, India. It is a village, panchayat and block with headquarters at Kodungoor on NH183. Basically an agrarian community inhabits this part, whose income depends on rubber cultivation.

== Demographics ==
As of 2001 India census, Vazhoor had a population of 23982 with 11722 males and 12260 females. The total geographical area of village is 2860 hectares. There are about 6,110 houses in Vazhoor village.

As of 2011 India census, Vazhoor had a population of 23909 with 11634 males and 12275 females.

== Education ==
Vazhoor have a number of educational institutions. SVRNSS College is a Kerala Govt. aided college run by the Nair Service Society and it is affiliated to the Mahatma Gandhi University, Kottayam, Kerala. The college was started in 1965. The nearby campus includes the SVRNSS Higher secondary school and the SVRNSS primary school. Government High School Kodungoor and Government LP school are located near the block headquarters at Kodungoor.

Vidyananda vidya bhavan is located near the town towards pala.

== Medical ==
Thiruvalla Medical Mission Hospital, Kodungoor. A Primary Health Centre, Govt veterinary & Govt. Homeo Dispensary are situated in the town. A few ayurvedic clinics and an allopathic clinic are situated in Vazhoor. There are also medical shops in Vazhoor.

== Topography ==
Vazhoor also has a vital juncture connected by roadways at Kodungoor, to some major towns around in Kottayam. National Highway NH 183 also containing State Highway SH 13 (KK ROAD) passes through Vazhoor.
