= Murugappa =

Murugappa may refer to:

- Murugappa family, Indian Nagarathar family
- A. M. M. Murugappa Chettiar (1902-1965), Indian industrialist
- Subbiah Murugappa Vellayan, Indian industrialist
- Murugappa Channaveerappa Modi (1916-2005), Indian ophthalmologist
- Murugappa Group, Indian business conglomerate
