= A. Vellayan =

Indian businessman (1953–2025)

Arunachalam Vellayan
- Born: 9 January 1953; Madras, Madras State (now Chennai, Tamil Nadu), India
- Died: 17 November 2025 (aged 72); Chennai, Tamil Nadu, India
- Education: The Doon School; Shri Ram College of Commerce; University of Delhi; University of Warwick
- Occupation: Executive Chairman of Murugappa Group
- Father: M. V. Arunachalam
- Relatives: M. V. Subbiah; M. M. Murugappan (Cousin)

Arunachalam Vellayan (9 January 1953 – 17 November 2025) was an Indian businessman who was the vice-chairman of the Murugappa Group, based in Chennai, India

In February 2018, he stepped down as chairman of the group, ceding the spot to his cousin M. M. Murugappan. He was the Chairman of Coromandel International Limited and EID Parry (India) Ltd. He was also the Chairman of the Fertiliser Association of India, and was a Director in AMM Educational Foundation and Kanoria Chemicals and Industries Ltd, Calcutta.

== Education ==
Vellayan was educated at The Doon School and attended Shri Ram College of Commerce, University of Delhi, followed by Warwick Business School in the United Kingdom.

== Career ==
Vellayan held a diploma in Industrial Administration from Aston University and a master's degree in business studies from Warwick Business School and was conferred the Doctor of Science (Honoris Causa) by the Tamil Nadu Agricultural University, Coimbatore. Some of the other positions held by him:

- Vice President — Federation of Indian Export Organisation
- Member — Board of Governors, Doon School
- President — ICC, India
- President — All India Cycle Manufacturers' Association
- Director — EXIM Bank
- Director — Indian Overseas Bank

In May 2015, Indian market regulator SEBI charged him in an Insider trading case related to the acquisition of Sabero Organics by Coromandel International in 2011.

On 31 January 2018, he was appointed the new chairman of the Society and Board of Governors of Indian Institute of Management, Kozhikode (IIM-K).

== Death ==
Vellayan died on 17 November 2025, at the age of 72.
