= Murugappa family =

Tamil business family

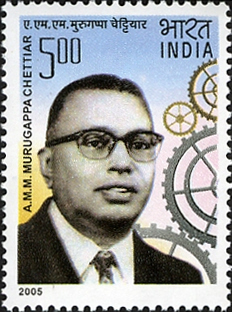
A. M. M. Murugappa Chettiar 2005 stamp of India

The Murugappa family is an Indian Tamil Nagarathar (Nattukottai Chettiar) business family that owns and manages the Murugappa Group, a conglomerate with interests in bicycles, sugar, abrasives, fertilizers, financial services, and manufacturing. In 2024, their net worth was estimated at ₹85,000 Crore (9.8 Billion USD).

Members include Murugappa Group former chairmen, M. M. Murugappan, M. V. Subbiah and A. Vellayan

In October 2024, the Murugappa family were ranked 26th on the Forbes list of India’s 100 richest tycoons, with a net worth of $10.1 billion.

== The group and family ==
Murugappa family

A. M. Murugappa Chettiar
A. M. M. Murugappa Chettiar	A. M. M. Vellayan Chettiar	A. M. M. Arunachalam
M. M. Muthiah	M. V. Arunachalam	M. V. Murugappan	M. V. Subbiah	M. A. Murugappan	M. A. Alagappan
M. M. Murugappan	M. M. Venkatachalam	A. Vellayan	A. Venkatachalam	S. Vellayan	Arun Murugappan	Arun Alagappan
Muthu Murugappan	Muthu Venkatachalam	Arun Vellayan	Narayanan Vellayan

=== Murugappa Chettiar Family ===
- Murugappa family
- Founder:

- Dewan Bahadur A. M. Murugappa Chettiar

- Second Generation:

- A. M. M. Murugappa Chettiar
- A. M. M. Vellayan Chettiar
- A. M. M. Arunachalam

=== Murugappa Group ===
==== Corporate ====
- Holding Company

- Ambadi Investments Limited

- Corporate Body

- Murugappa Corporate Advisory Board (www.murugappa.com/murugappa-corporate-advisory-board/)

==== Group - Chairman(Murugappa Family) ====
- Murugappa family
- Founder:

- Dewan Bahadur A. M. Murugappa Chettiar

- Past Chairman:

- A. M. M. Murugappa Chettiar
- A. M. M. Arunachalam
- M. M. Muthaiah
- M. V. Arunachalam
- M. V. Murugappan
- M. V. Subbiah
- M. A. Alagappan
- A. Vellayan
- M. M. Murugappan
