= Perunad =

Ranni-Perunad
- Village
- Interactive map of Ranni-Perunad
- Coordinates: 9°22′0″N 76°52′15″E
- Country: India
- State: Kerala
- District: Pathanamthitta

Government
  - Body: Perunad grama panchayath

Area
  - Total: 82.06 km^{2} (31.68 sq mi)

Population (2001)
  - Total: 22,130
  - Density: 270/km^{2} (700/sq mi)

Languages
  - Official: Malayalam, English
- Time zone: UTC+5:30 (IST)
- PIN: 689711
- Telephone code: 04735
- Vehicle registration: KL-03, KL-62
- Nearest city: Erumeli, Ranni, Pathanamthitta
- Lok Sabha constituency: Pathanamthitta
- Vidhan Sabha constituency: Ranni
- Website: lsgkerala.in/

Perunad (Ranni-Perunad) is a scenic hilly village in Ranni Thaluk of Pathanamthitta district, Kerala state, India. Perunad is situated at the banks of Pampa River and Kakkattar . The Famous Hindu Temple Sabarimala is in this panchayath.Nearest City is Ranni and Pathanamthitta. Perunad under Thiruvalla Revenue Division

Perunad is located on the main road to Sabarimala, the Mannarakkulanji-Chalakkayam State Highway. National Highway 183A (Adoor to Vandiperiyar) also passes through Perunad. It is surrounded by the villages Chittar, Vadasserikkara and Naranammoozhy. The road to Gavi, Angamoozhy, Kakki and Moozhiyar passes through the village. A part of the famous Periyar Tiger Reserve is situated in this panchayat. R-Perunad Panchayath Office is based at Perunad village. Perunad police station, Perunad village office, KSEB office and community health centre are all situated close to each other near Perunad Ambalam junction.

Perunad is chiefly a plantation village, the important cash crops being rubber, pepper, ginger, coconut and food crops like tapioca, banana, pineapple, rambuttan. The economy of Perunad was affected by a drop in rubber prices. People are now moving to newer areas like mixed farming with cattle breeding, fruit-yielding trees like rambutan, pineapple, banana, and tapioca.

== Administration ==
Perunad comes under the Ranni block of Ranni taluk in Thiruvalla Revenue Division of Pathanamthitta district. The current president of the panchayath is Sri P.S.Mohanan (CPI-M).

=== Wards in Perunad panchayath ===
- Mukkam
- Perunad
- Madathummoozhy
- Puthukkada
- Arayanjilimon
- Thulappally
- Naranamthodu
- Kisumom
- Sabarimala
- Manakkayam
- Kannanumon
- Nedumon
- Mampara
- Kakkad
- Madamon

== Pilgrim centers ==
=== Ranni Perunad Kakkattukoyikkal Sree Dharma Sastha Temple ===
Perunad Sree Dharma Sastha temple, also known as Kakkattu Koyikkal Sree Dharma Sastha temple, is located at Perunad near Ranni in Pathanamthitta District. The annual festival in the shrine is observed for five days starting with Uthiram Nakshatra in Medam month.

The temple, located on the banks of Kakkatu Aru, is a Sastha or Ayyappa temple and he is worshipped here with his spouses Purna and Pushkala. There is also a belief that the murti is Vettakkorumakan. The deity faces east.

The main upa devata in the temple is Rakshas.

The Thiruvabharanam which is brought back from Sabarimala Ayyappa Temple after Makaravilakku is adorned on the Sastha murti worshipped in Perunad Sree Dharma Sastha temple.

In ancient times this temple was the keezhedam of Sabarimala Ayyappa Temple. Perunad is noted for the Kakkattu Koikkal Sree Dharma Sastha Temple. The processions of Thiruvabharanam and "Thanka Anki" - The Royal Ornaments of Lord Ayyappa halt here. The Ayyappa idol in the temple used to get decorated with Thiruvabharanam for a day (21 January) during its return trip from Sabarimala to Pandalam palace. This gives an opportunity for the women to witness Lord Ayyappa decorated with Thiruvabharanam as young women were prohibited from entering Sabarimala temple before 2018. Thousands of people turn up for this annual event from all parts of south Kerala. Also a temple for Malikapurathamma is situated near the Ayyappa temple in Perunad. Followed by Hrishikesha Temple Madamon (the Lord Krishna Temple) is one of major temple in Perunad.

=== Bethany St. Thomas orthodox church ===
Bethany Ashram And The Parish (Bethany Pally) was founded in the same year 1918, The First Parish in eastern area of Malankara Orthodox Syrian Church under the Nilakkal diocese. The land for the parish was donated by Bethany ashram foundation. The stone of the first church was laid in 1918 by Ref. Fr. P. T Geevargheese and Dn. Alexious.

Renovation and extension of the present church was started on 23 November 2008 by Very Rev. Fr. Christophorus Remban. The foundation stone was laid by Rev. Fr. F. K Thomas Tharayath on 1 December 2008 and consecrated by, H. G Mathews Mar Theodosious on 8 March 2009. The Holy Eucharist is offered every Sunday. The church has M. G. O. C. S. M, Prayer Groups, Marthamariam Samajam, Youth League and Sunday school. The parish has a strength of more than 150 families.

=== Bethel Marthoma Syrian Church ===
A 100-year-old Malankara Mar Thoma Syrian church under Nilakal Orthodox Diocese(renovated in January 2017) in Madathumoozhy.

=== Sabarimala Sree Sastha Temple ===
A pilgrim centre, Sabarimala Sree Sastha Temple, is located in Perunad Panchayat. Perunad is a resting and stopping point for pilgrims to take bath in Pampa/Kakkad rivers and is a stopover (for food/fuel/ATM/hospitals/police station/etc) before moving into forest areas on the way to Sabarimala hills.

- Malankara Catholic Pilgrim Centre is of religious importance. Bethany CMS Anglican Church is also an ancient Church in Perunad. St. Jude Catholic Church. Also Pentecostal Churches (IPC- Koonamkara, Church of God in India-Madathumoozhy and Assemblies of God, The Pentecostal Mission- Near Perunadu Market) have their churches in Perunad village.
- Juma Masjid and Madrassa at Vayaramaruthy is an Islamic prayer mosque and educational centre for Muslims in Perunad
- A temple with Sree Narayana Guru as deity is located at Velliya Paalum junction.
- A famous pilgrim centre is the Bethany ashramam which is located on the Bethany Hills.
- Sabari Balikashramam, Koonamkara (children's shelter)

== Educational institutions ==
- High School, Perunad- Just 0.5 km from Perunad village office.
- Bethany St. Mary's GHS- Just 1 km from Perunad Village office.
- Perunad LP school - Just 0.2 km from Perunad village office.
- Kisumam Govt H. S. S
- Govt U P School Madamon.- Just 3 km from Perunad village office.
- Govt LP School Kakkad, Mampara - Just 2.5 km from Perunad village office.
- St. Thomas UP School, Kakkad, Mampara - Just 3 km from Perunad village office.

== Economy ==
Perunad is known for its greenery and natural environment. Rivers flowing through Perunad are Pamba and Kakkad. Kakkad river joins river Pamba at Pothumoodu junction on its onward journey. Rubber, pepper, banana, coconut, ginger, pineapple, and rambutan are the main cultivations.

== Transportation ==
1. By Air Chipsan Aviation helicopter service from Nedumbassery airport to Perunad Helipad (Kuttikayam helipad).
2. Both state-run KSRTC and private operated buses connect Perunad to Pathanamthitta and Ranni towns.
3. Auto rickshaws and taxis are available and generally hired for short distance (1–3 km) where bus service are non-existent or rare.
4. Jeep & car is another preferred mode of transport.

=== Heliport ===
Perunad Heliport (helipad), also known as Sabarimala helipad, is situated in Kuttikayam estate, Mampara road. Chipsan Aviation Pvt Ltd, having service from various location. Most of the Sabarimala pilgrims are using this heliport.

=== Railway ===
The nearest railway stations are at Thiruvalla (44 km) and Chengannur (40 km). Nearest busstand to Perunad is KSRTC stands in Pathanamthitta (17 km) and Ranni(13 km). There is a big chain of bus services from private and KSRTC. The KSRTC Pamba buses plies through the village 24 hours to Pamba during Sabarimala season from Pathanamthitta and Chengannur. Perunad can be reached in 30–45 minutes by private bus/KSRTC buses from Pathanamthitta[17;km] and in 20–30 minutes from Ranni[13;km].

=== Airport ===
Trivandrum International Airport (123 km) and Cochin International Airport, at Nedumbassery (130 km), Kochi are the airports most commonly used to reach here. Proposed Sabarimala airport project was planning to build in Perunad Panchayath at laha Estate which comes around 3 km from Madathummoozhy Junction. But Kerala government given preference to Cheruvally Estate would be the closest airport upon completion, at 10 km away. if it comes up will become the nearest airport in Pathanamthitta & Kottayam district.

== Main places ==
Madathummoozhy, Perunad Market, Koonamkara, Kolamala, Puthukkada, Kannanumon, Lahai, Mampara, Pambavalley, Thulappally, Valiya palam, Poovathummoodu and Madamon are the major places in this village. Perunthenaruvi [13 km] from Perunad is an important tourist point near Perunad via Athikayam you reach these water falls. You need to walk a little to enjoy these falls. You need to take care from falling into these falls and you have to carry food/water in these unexplored forests. There are 2 hospitals in Perunad. 1. Community Health Centre, near Perunad panchayath office 2. Bethany Hospital, near Bethanypally Perunad.

Major nationalized banks in Perunad is Central Bank of India and Canara Bank at Madathummoozhy and an SBT, SBI and CBI ATM counters at Madathummoozhy. Perunad Sahakarana Bank and Pathanamthitta Cooperative Bank too have offices here so does Muthoot, Mulamootil and a few other non banking finance companies. Akshya E-centre (Paurnami Computers), an important e-governance centre for people, is in Madathumoozhy, Perunad. Nearest petrol/diesel pump between Pampa and Vadasserikkara is at Velliyapalam. Vishwanath fuels, Velliyapalam/Perunad. Perunad has offices for state treasury/Kerala State Beverages Corporation outlets.

=== Government hospital ===
Community Health Centre, Ranni-Perunad, situated near to Perunad gramapanchayath office, is 17 km away from Pathanamthitta. The institution is under the Department of Health Services, Government of Kerala. It caters to a population of nearly 22,000. Community health care services are delivered at this centre. The public health sector of the panchayath is solely under the control of community health centre. National health programs like UIP, NPCDCS, RNTCP, IDSP, PMSMA etc. are implemented through the centre.

== Climate ==
Like the rest of the state, Perunad has a wet and maritime tropical climate. The region receives most of the rain from the South-West monsoon from June to August and the North-East monsoon during October and November. Although the summer is from March to May, it receives locally developed thundershowers in May. Due to the higher elevation, the climate is cooler towards the eastern area. It's hot and humid throughout the year except for rainy season from June–August. Perunad has cool nights and mornings during October–December, generally it's hot and sweaty in 9-10 out of 12 months in a year. It's difficult to believe but true to learn that Perunad used to be cool place like Munnar or Ponmudi around a century back and Tea used to be the major crop then later on climatic changes led to coffee and much later on to rubber which continues to be the crop in presently hot and humid climate of Perunad.

== Dam and projects ==
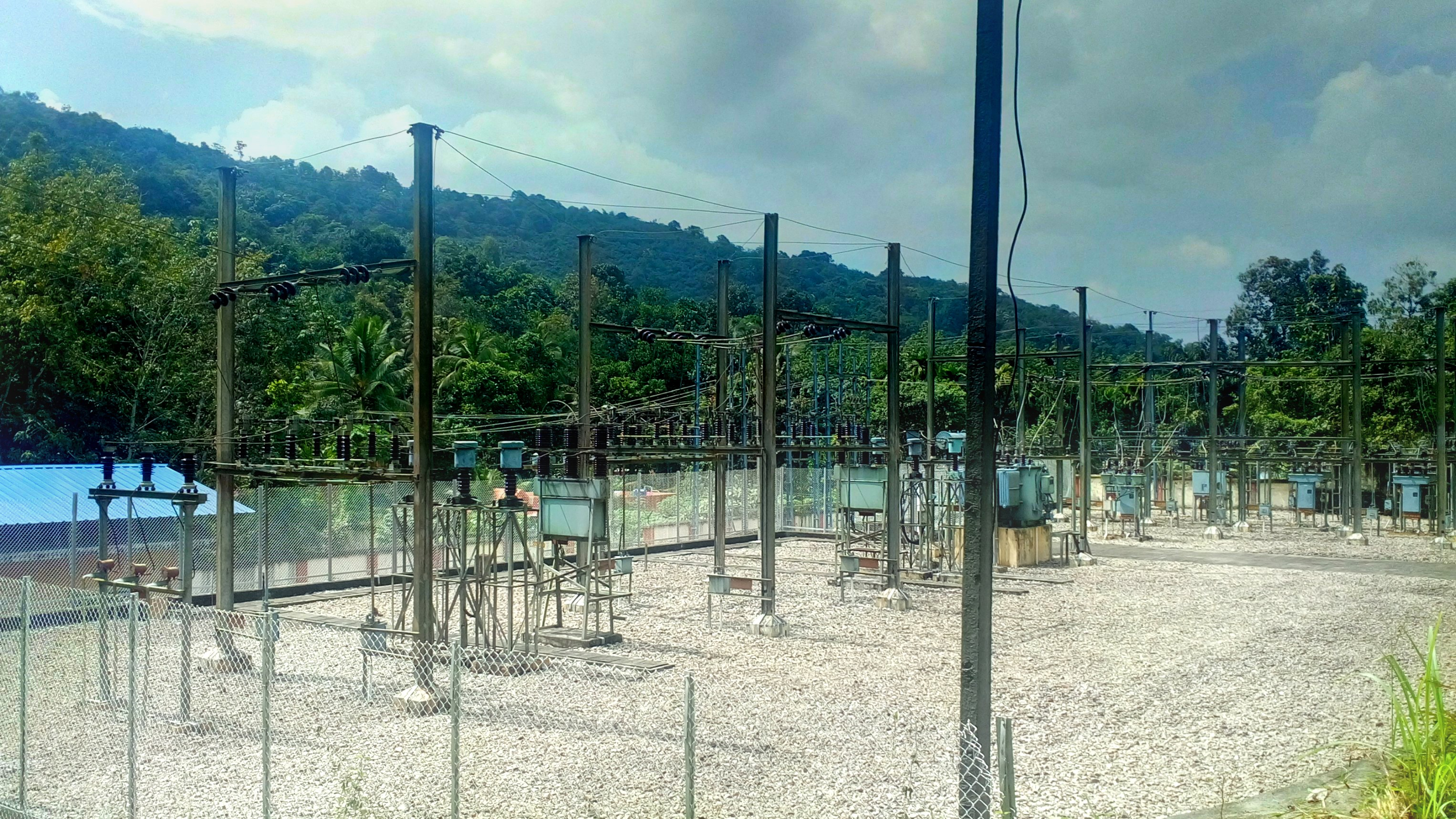
33kv sub Station at Perunad

There are two main dams

- Maniyar Dam
- Perunad hydro electric project (see also Ranni-Perinad Weir)

One Hydal Electric Project is opened here in February 2012. Both government and private hospitals, libraries, recreation clubs are also here.

== Religion ==
Hinduism and Christianity are the main religions followed here. People from all communities. Hindus, Christians and Muslims co-exist harmoniously in this village.

== Politics ==
Pathanamthitta assembly constituency was part of the Idukki (Lok Sabha constituency) but now Pathanamthitta is a separate Lok Sabha constituency. Sri. Anto Antony of Indian National Congress is the MP from Pathanamthitta parliament and Sri. Pramod Narayanan of Kerala Congress is the MLA from Ranni assembly seat. R-Perunad panchayath is a Communist stronghold. President of R-Perunad panchayath is Sri. P S Mohanan of Communist Party of India [Marxist]. Vice President of R-Perunad panchayath Smt. D. Sreekala of Communist Party of India.

== Demographics ==
Perunad is inhabited since 200–300 yearsago. The first settlers were agriculturists. As of 2011 India census, Perunad had a population of 15,018 with 7,192 males and 7,820 females. 88% of people are literate in Perunad, and the village has an unemployment rate of 62%.
