= Ranni-Perinad Weir =

Diversion dam in Kerala, India

Coordinates: 9°21′00″N 76°52′00″E

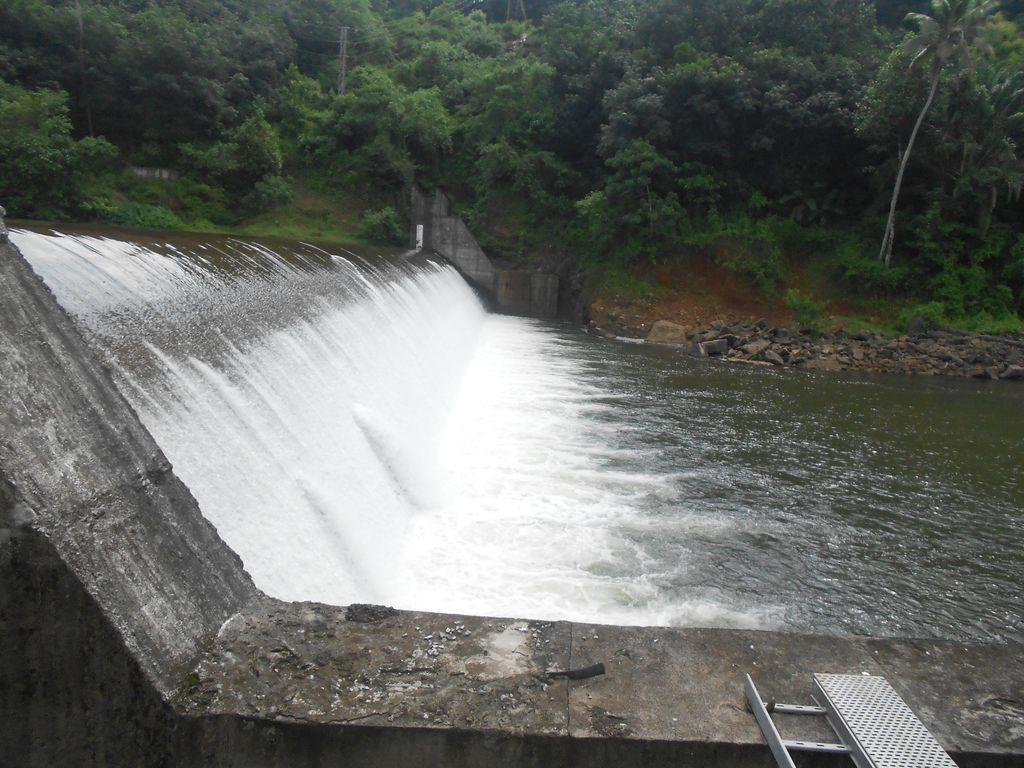
- Interactive map of Ranni-Perinad Weir
- Country: India
- Status: Operational
- Opening date: 2012

Dam and spillways
- Type of dam: Gravity dam
- Spillway type: Ungated

Ranni-Perinad Weir is a diversion dam built in Kakkad river which is a tributary of Pamba River at Mampara in the Ranni and Perunad villages of Pathanamthitta district of Kerala, India. The weir is a concrete-gravity type and is a part of Ranni–Perunad Small Hydro Electric Project, a run off the river scheme in Kakkad river in Pamba basin. It envisages the development of power by utilizing the tail race water from the Maniyar Power house, with installed capacity of 4.0 MW ( 2x 2.0 MW). The release of the water from the dam is to Kakkad river which in turn flows and joins Pamba river and flows through taluks such as Ranni, Konni, Kozhencherry, Thiruvalla, Chengannur, Kuttanadu, Mavelikara and Karthikappally. The dam is also a part of Ranni-Perunad Water supply scheme.

== Specifications ==
- Panchayath: Ranni-Perunad
- Village: Ranni and Perunad
- District: Pathanamthitta
- River Basin: Pamba
- River: Kakkad
- Release from Dam to river: Kakkad
- Material: Concrete
- Classification: Weir
- Maximum Water Level (MWL): EL 22.10 m
- Full Reservoir Level ( FRL): EL 18.10 m
- Storage at FRL:1.0 Mm3
- Height from deepest foundation: 9.35 m
- Length: 124 m
- Spillway: Ungated – Overflow section
- Crest Level: EL 18.10 m
- River Outlet: Not provided

== Ranni-Perunad Small Hydro Electric Project ==
This project is a tailrace scheme to the Maniyar project, operated by M/s Carborandum Universal. Tail race discharge water after power generation is released to the Pamba River.

Catchment Area	288.283 Sq. km. (8.283 sqkm free catchment plus 280 sqkm catchment of maniyar Project)
Location	
Place	Mampara
Panchayath	Ranni Perunad
Taluk	Ranni
District	Pathanamthitta
Installed Capacity	4 MW (2 x 2 MW)
Annual generation potential	16.73 MU
Prime mover	Horizontal shaft Kaplan Turbine
