= Thomas Parry (East India merchant) =

Merchant based in India (1768–1824)

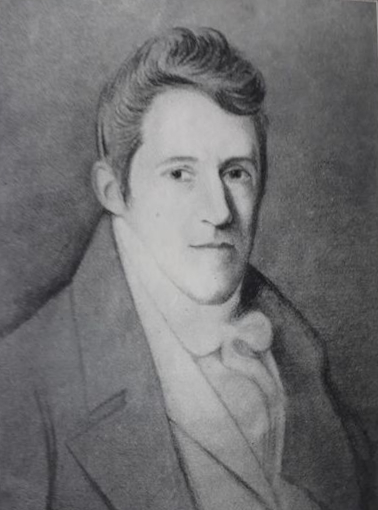
Thomas Parry c. 1805

Thomas Parry (1768 – 14 August 1824) was a Welsh merchant based in India. He was instrumental in establishing a trading company in Madras, India. Parry joined John William Dare to establish Parry & Dare in 1819 and this later became EID Parry company whose building gives the name of Parry's Corner, a well-known central business district of Chennai.

== Early life ==
Parry was the third son and seventh child of Edward Parry and Anne Vaughan of Leighton Hall near Welshpool. The Parrys traced their ancestry to Elystan Glodrudd and Edward of Leighton Hall was a wealthy squire. Thomas's father Edward died when Thomas was five years old and his early life is untraced but for his sailing to India at the age of 19. A cousin and brother-in-law, Gilbert Ross Jr. (1755–1815), married to Thomas's sister Elizabeth (1759–1825) and son of an aunt Aunt Ann Ross (née Parry), had connections in Madras. Colonel Patrick Ross was Chief Engineer at Fort St. George. Gilbert Ross Sr. was a partner in Ross & Burgie on Mark Lane and died on 4 March 1788. His will was probated March 14th, 1788 (Source National Archives) and contains an affidavit signed by Thomas Parry 'of Billiter Lane', suggesting that Thomas was tutored to be a merchant under the guidance of his uncle, alongside his cousin Gilbert Ross Jr who inherited his father's business. Parry appears to have set out to India to expand the business of Ross who had an agent, Thomas Case in Chennai. Sailing from Deal on 4 March, Parry arrived in Madras on 27 June 1788.

== Career ==
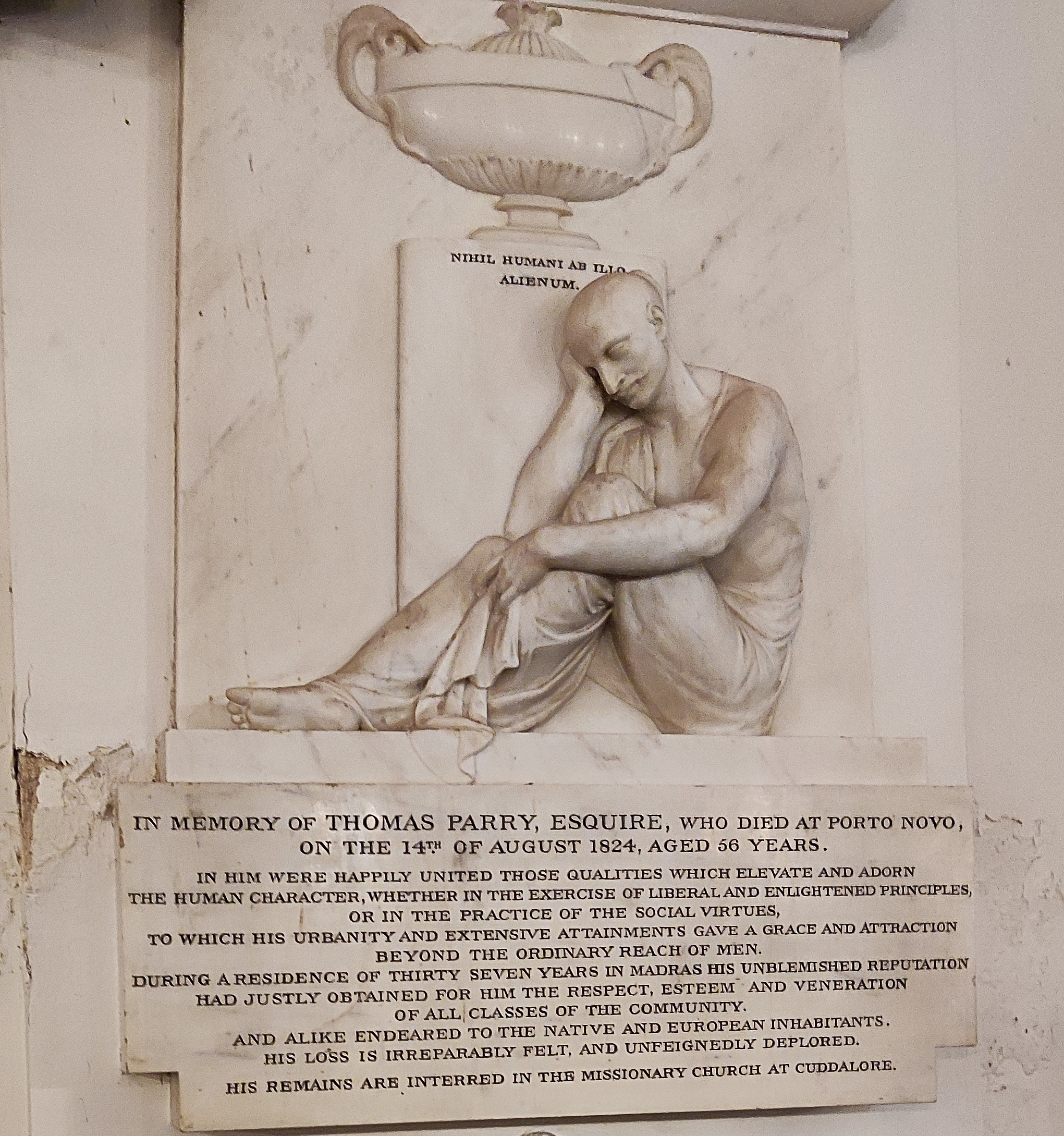
Memorial to Thomas Parry, St. George's Cathedral, Madras. The cup resembles the one gifted him in 1824.

Parry was licensed by the Governor of Madras as a Free Merchant on 12 February 1789, free from the controls of the East India Company. He established a business on 17 July 1788, selling goods and providing banking services. On 1 November 1789 he entered into a partnership with Thomas Chase and formed Chase and Parry. Parry was involved in leather business with a tannery in San Thome. In 1807 he noted that he sold 100 pairs of boots to the 22nd Dragoons in Bangalore with the boots costing Rs 1000 and the transport being Rs 1800. On 1 May 1790 they incorporated a partner Henry Sewell, a former naval officer and brother-in-law of Thomas Chase. This increased overall earnings but Parry's share of profits declined. On 1 January 1792 he began his own business of shipping which saw growth thanks to Lord Cornwallis and his actions against Tipu. Parry was an admirer of the Whig Charles James Fox. In 1794 Parry married Mary Pearce, widow of a civil servant and merchant Thomas Pearce and daughter of James West. They had a daughter Eliza and a son John but both died young. Parry sought to start a newspaper in 1794 as there was just one, the Madras Courier founded in 1785. This was however not granted permission by the Government. In 1795 he began to trade under the name of Thomas Parry & Co. Around 1797 it went by the name of Parry, Garrow and Co. with partner George Garrow. In 1796 he became a secretary of the Carnatic Insurance Company. He purchased land for a garden house from Colonel Braithwaite, and built Parry's Castle, now called Leith Castle, in 1796. Parry joined the service of the Nawab Omdat-ul-Omrah at the end of 1796 receiving a salary of 2100 pounds a year. In 1809 he purchased Pycroft's Garden in Nungambakkam. His connection to the Nawab led to his being dismissed by the Court of Directors at Fort St. George who wrote a letter on 20 May 1800 that he would not be protected anymore and told to return to Britain at the earliest. He however attempted appeals and in 1801 his partner Garrow left having taken up a covenanted post. John King Lane joined as a new partner and Parry and Lane was established in 1801. In 1803 they set up their office in George Town.

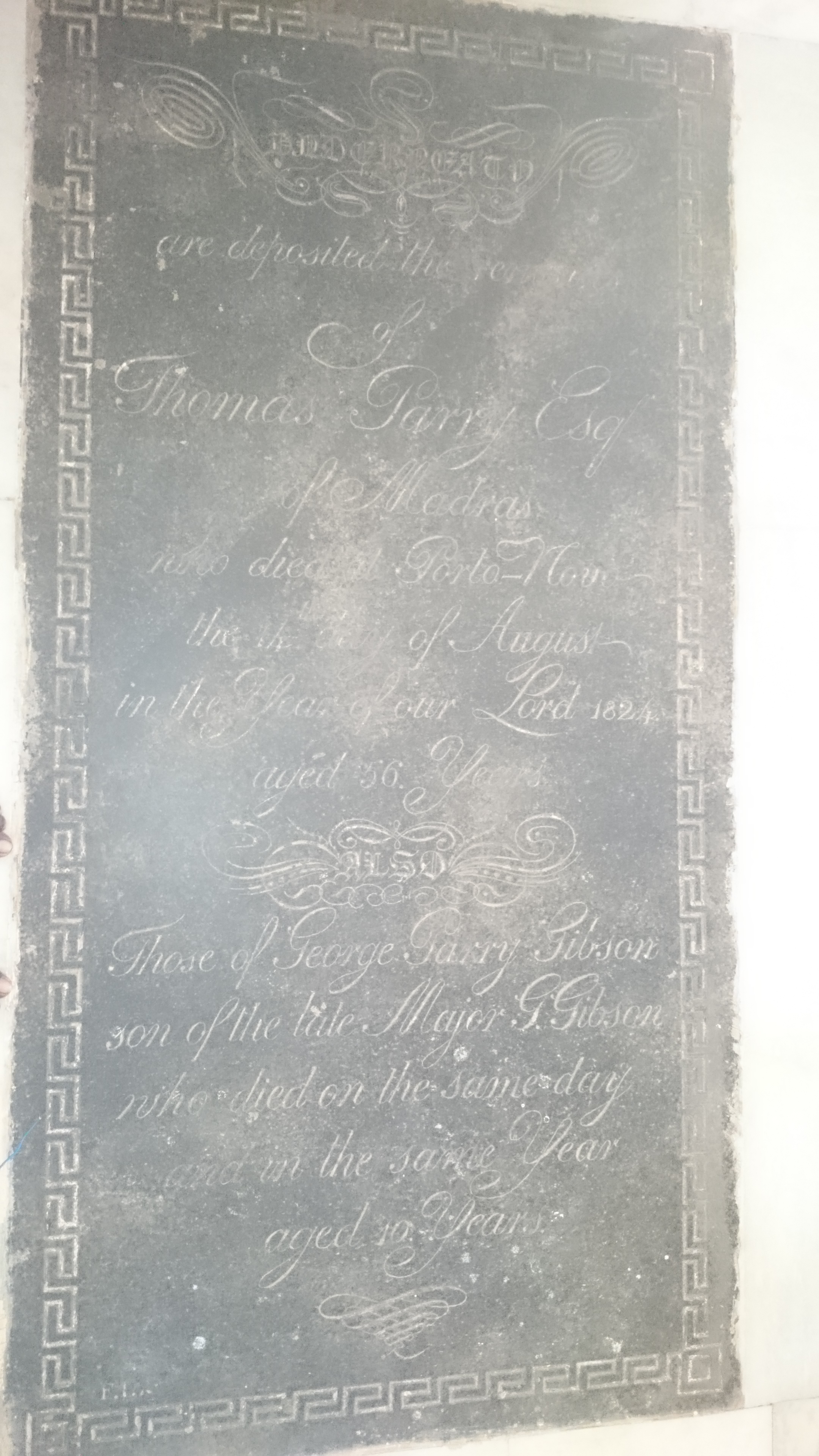
Gravestone in Cuddalore

In 1805 the banishment order was taken back and he established a tannery. When his partner Lane joined the Government Bank, the partnership was again dissolved and he then joined John Neill and A. T. Gibbons of Ceylon and formed Parry Neill & Co. Their main business was with the navy in Ceylon. He suffered a major loss when a ship, Marquis Wellesley, that he owned shares in caught fire off Calicut. The Captain of the ship John Grant received a large sum in insurance and apparently made good profits without the knowledge of Parry. He then moved out of shipping and began to take an interest in indigo cultivation in Cuddalore and Chidambaram. He then began to take an interest in sugarcane and tea. He also began to trade to Southeast Asia with cargo despatched via the General Wellesley under Captain Dalrymple who had received a letter of introduction to Captain Bligh, Governor of Botany Bay. This shipment however was ill-fated with Bligh being imprisoned resulting in further losses. Parry and his family suffered poor health and in 1806 they sailed to England where he contracted smallpox but recovered. In 1808 the partnership with John Neill was dissolved and in 1809 his nephew David Pugh joined to form Parry and Pugh. In the same year Parry was caught up with the Carnatic Debts scandal which involved forged bonds issued by the Nawab Wallajah and his son. In 1810, J. W. Dare joined Parry as partner. Parry and Dare purchased a ship General Palmer in 1819. In 1813, Parry began another partnership under the name of Parry, Pugh & Breithaupt which earned profits of Rs 86000 in their fifth year. In 1824 he was gifted a gold cup by his friends in Madras in appreciation of his work.

In 1822 Parry had a son, Thomas William, by Mary Ann Carr who died young. Another son with the middle name Moorat suggest that the mother may have been a daughter of the Armenian merchant E. S. Moorat.

== Death ==
Parry died of cholera along with George Parry Gibson, a ten-year old relative, while on a visit to his indigo works in August 1824. Parry was buried at Porto Novo in what is now the C.S.I. Christ Church (also called as missionary church) Cuddalore Port, India. His will included monthly payments for his servants, a blind woman who lived under his care. The executors were J. W. Dare, David and Joseph Pugh.

== See also ==
- EID Parry
