= Kakkattar =

Tributary of Pamba river

Kakkad River Kakkattar
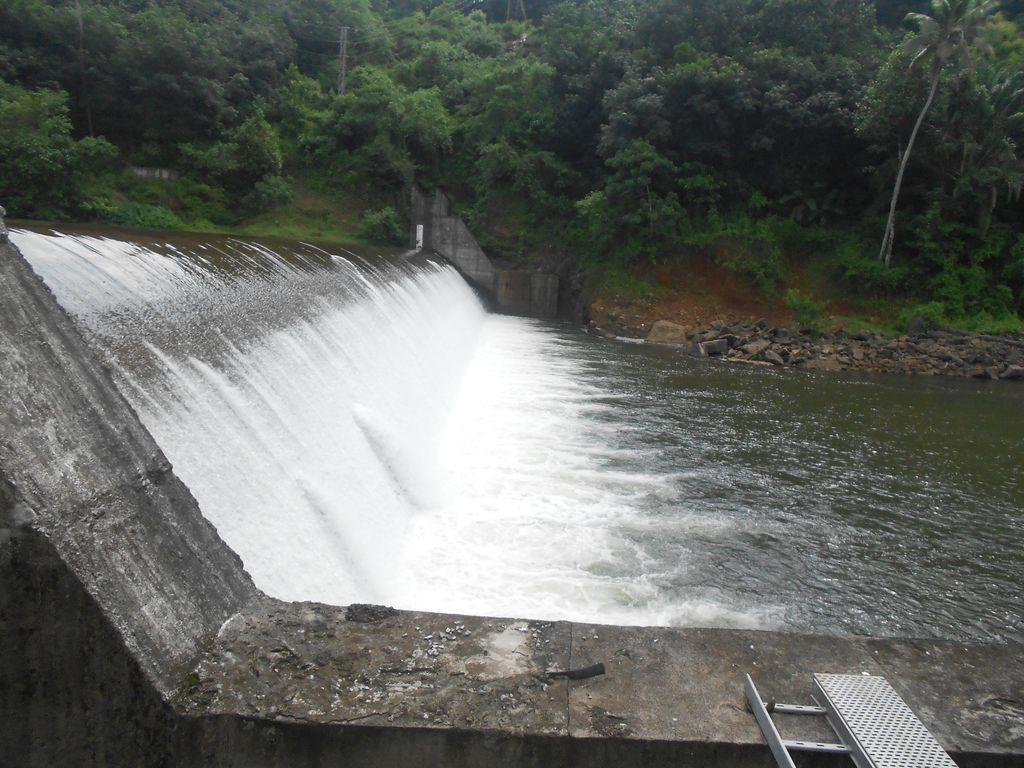
- Perunad weir built on Kakkad river

- Location of the mouth in Kerala Kakkattar (India)
- Native name: കക്കാട്ടാർ (Malayalam)

Location
- Country: India
- State: Kerala
- District: Pathanamthitta

Physical characteristics
- Mouth: Pamba
  - location: Perunad
  - coordinates: 9°22′03″N 76°50′48″E
  - elevation: 16 m (52 ft)

Basin features
- Landmarks: Kakkattu Koikkal Sree Dharma Sastha Temple
- Cities: Angamoozhy; Seethathodu; Perunad
- Bridges: Angamoozhy bridge Seethathodu bridge Manakkayam bridge Swing bridge Perunad bridge Poovathummood bridge
- Dams: Allunkal dam Karikayam dam Maniyar dam Perunad weir

Kakkad River or Kakkattar is a tributary of the Pamba river, the third longest river in the South Indian state of Kerala. The river passes through places like Angamoozhy, Seethathodu, Manakkayam, Maniyar and joins the Pamba river at Perunad.

== See also ==
- List of rivers of Kerala
- Kakkad Hydro Electric Project
