= Kakkad Hydro Electric Project =

- Interactive map of Kakkad Hydro Electric Project
- Country: India
- Purpose: Hydroelectric
- Status: Completed
- Construction began: 1999
- Owner: Kerala State Electricity Board

Power Station
- Type: Hydro Power Plant
- Installed capacity: 50 MW (2 x 25 MW)
- Website; Kerala State Electricity Board

The Kakkad Hydroelectric Power Plant is located near Seethathode, in the Pathanamthitta district of the Indian state of Kerala. It is operated by the Kerala State Electricity Board.

This hydropower plant has a design capacity of 50 MWe. It has 2 turbines, commissioned in 1998 and 1999.

== Features ==
The project is in the second stage of development. The installed capacity is 50 MW (2 x 25MW). This scheme utilizes the tail race water from Sabarigiri power station and water from the Moozhiyar and Velluthode rivers. Two dams store water for the powerhouse. The main reservoir is on the Moozhiyar. The second reservoir is formed by the Veluthodu dam, across the Velluthode river. After generating power, water is released to the Kakkad River. Ullunkal and Karikkayam power stations use this water for power generation and then release it into the Maniyar reservoir for power generation at the Maniyar power station.

Kerala hydropower station
Attribute	Value
State Name	Kerala
District	Pathanamthitta
River	Moozhiyar, Veluthodu /Pamba
Basin Name	West flowing rivers from Tadri to Kanyakumari
Hydro Elec Region	Southern HE Region
Total Installed Capacity (MW)	50
Type of Project	Hydroelectric Powerplant
Project Status	Completed
Project Owner Type	Government
Owner Name	Kerala State Electricity Board
Inter Basin Project	No
Project Sharing	None
Inter State Agreement- (Ratio like 50:50)
International Sharing	None

== Related projects ==
- Kakkad Power House
- Upper Moozhiyar Dam
- Upper Moozhiyar Spillway Dam
- Veluthoda Forebay (Kakkad) Dam
- Moolamattom hydro power station
