= M. M. Murugappan =

Indian businessman

M. M. Murugappan is a fourth-generation member of the Murugappa family and the former chairman of the Murugappa Group.

== Biography ==
He is the current chairman of the Carborundum Universal Ltd, Cholamandalam MS General Insurance Company Limited, Murugappa Water & Technology Solutions and trustee of the AMM foundation. He also serves as the Correspondent of the Murugappa Polytechnic College and on the board of IIT Madras-Research Park. Murugappan is a non-executive chairman on the board of Cyient Ltd. He retired from the board of Mahindra & Mahindra Ltd in 2020. He also serves as an Independent Director of Carson Cumberbatch, Sri Lanka. In 2022, he was appointed the chairman of the board of governors of IIM Indore (Indian Institute of Management) for a four-year term.

He studied in The Lawrence School, Lovedale and has a Bachelor's in Chemical Engineering from the AC College of Technology, University of Madras, and a Master of Science Degree in Chemical Engineering from the University of Michigan, United States. He is a member of the American and Indian Institutes of Chemical Engineers, the Indian Ceramic Society and the Plastics and Rubber Institute. In December 2019, M. M. Murugappan was awarded a Lifetime Achievement award by the Vikatan Group for his contributions to the industry. He was also awarded the Lifetime Achievement award at TiECON Chennai 2022.

He is also the former chairman and director of Murugappa Group companies Tube Investments of India (TII), Coromandel International Ltd, and Cholamandalam Investment and Finance Company. In 2018, in an interview with Business Standard, he mentioned how ancient Chinese writings and John Heider's book The Tao of Leadership influenced his ‘simple’ leadership style.

In August 2019, at the CEO Awards 2019 ceremony, M. M. Murugappan bagged the “Boundary Breaker” award, given to “an extraordinary individual of Indian origin running an Indian company with a global presence while delivering superior performance”.

An hockey enthusiast, Murugappan continues the legacy of the MCC-Murugappa Gold Cup national-level hockey tournament that has taken place in Chennai for more than 9 decades.

Murugappan currently resides in Chennai, India.
