= Sedis =

Sedis may refer to:

- Sedis Bàsquet, a women's basketball team of La Seu d'Urgell, Spain
- Sedis, French chain manufacturer owned by Tube Investments of India Limited since 2010
