= Tube Products of India =

Unit of Tube Investments of India Ltd

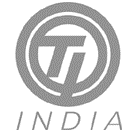
- Company type: Private Company
- Founded: 1955
- Founder: murugappa group
- Headquarters: Avadi, Chennai, India
- Products: steel tubes and Strip steel
- Number of employees: 1600
- Website: tubeproductsindia.com

Tube Products of India (TPI) a Unit of Tube Investments of India Ltd. is a steel tubes manufacturer based in India.

== History ==
Tube Investments of India is a flagship company of Murugappa Group. Tube Products of India was established in collaboration with Tube Products (Old Bury) Limited, UK to produce Electric resistance welding (ERW) and Cold Drawn Welded (CDW) tubes also called as Drawn Over Mandrel tubes.

The International Business Division (IBD) gearing TPI to compete with global tube manufacturers. The most recent addition to TPI is the Tubular Components Division (TCD), which manufactures high strength tubular auto components, providing the advantage of weight reduction, higher component efficiency and cost reduction.

TPI produces CRCA strips including special extra deep drawing, high tensile, medium carbon, high carbon finding application in industries such as Bearings, Automobile, Auto Ancillaries, white goods, fine blanking and General Engineering.

== Images ==
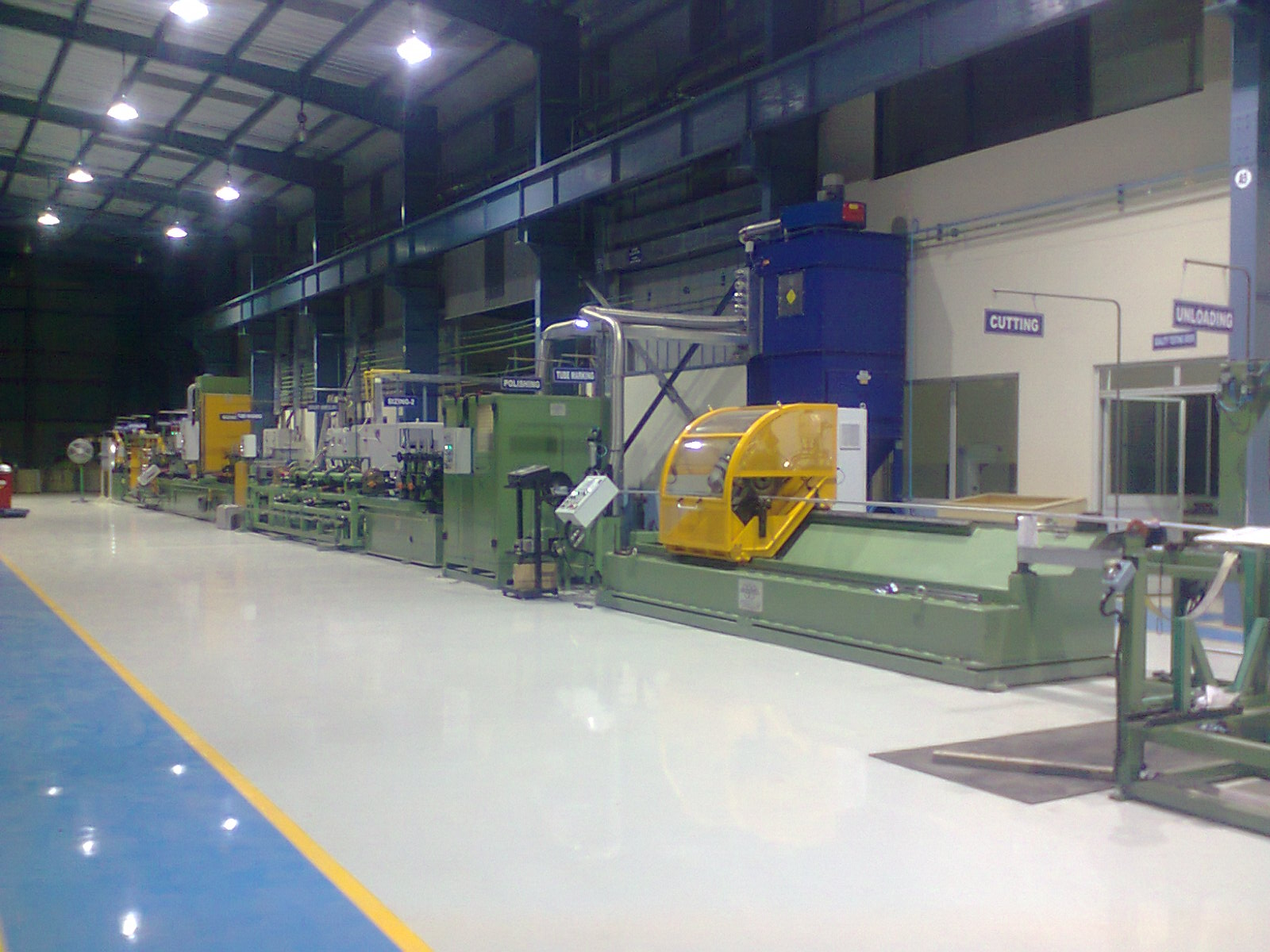

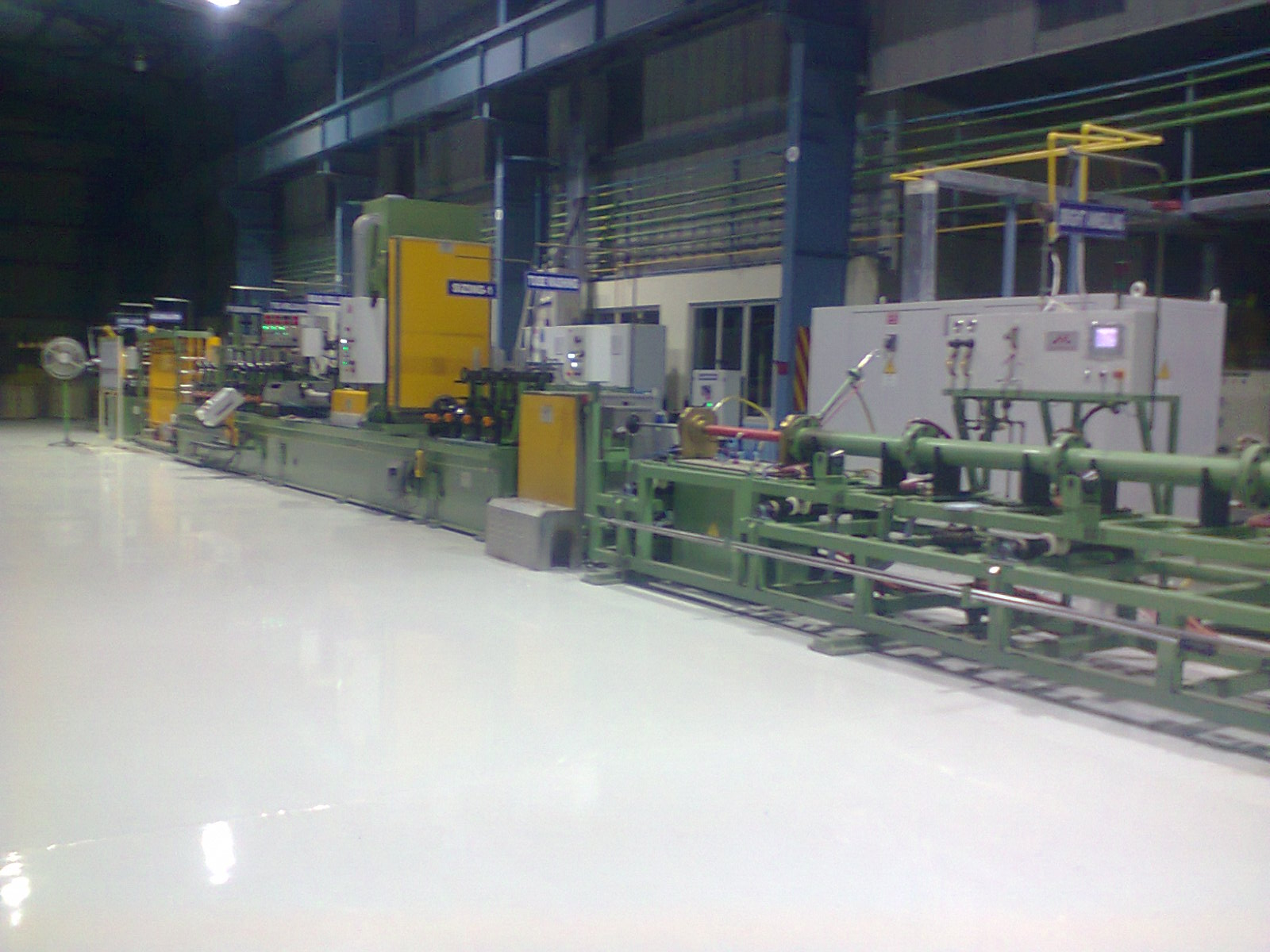

== See also ==
- Murugappa Group
- TI Cycles of India
- Tube Investments of India Ltd
