= Maniyar, Pathanamthitta =

Maniyar Foreign Padi
- Nickname: pallikunel veedu
- Location in Kerala, India Maniyar (India)
- Coordinates: 9°19′20″N 76°52′30″E
- Country: India
- State: Kerala
- District: Pathanamthitta
- Established: 19/04/1962

Government
  - Type: Panchayathvadasserikara

Languages
  - Official: Malayalam, English
- Time zone: UTC+5:30 (IST)
- PIN: 689662
- Vehicle registration: KL-62, KL-03

Maniyar is a small town in Pathanamthitta district, in Kerala state, India. Maniyar is located on the Pathanamthitta - Seethathodu Road.

The town is near the river Pamba where there is a Government irrigation project.

== Location ==
Geographically Maniyar is High-range area. Maniyar Dam is located near to the township. It is mainly a Plantation Township. Both state run Kerala State Road Transport Corporation and privately operated buses connect Maniyar to Pathanamthitta City. Carborundum Universal-a Murugappa Group company has set up power generation plant attached to the dam. This plant has a capacity of 12 MW and extends employment to more than 40 people directly.

== Flora and fauna ==
Maniyar is home to a wide range of birds and wild animals. Hornbills, the engendered birds, are widely seen in this area.
