= Allunkal Dam =

Diversion dam in Kerala, India

- Location within Kerala Location within India
- Interactive map of Allunkal Dam
- Official name: Ullunkal Dam
- Country: India
- Location: Pathanamthitta, Kerala
- Coordinates: 9°20′15″N 76°56′50″E
- Purpose: Power
- Status: Operational
- Owner: Energy Development Company Limited
- Operator: EDCL Power Projects Limited

Dam and spillways
- Type of dam: Barrage
- Impounds: Kakkad River
- Height (foundation): 12 m (39 ft)
- Length: 121 m (397 ft)
- Spillway capacity: 1,120 m^{3}/s (40,000 cu ft/s)

Allunkal Power House
- Coordinates: 9°20′15″N 76°56′49″E
- Operator: EDCL Power Projects Limited
- Commission date: 2009 (17 years ago)
- Type: Run-of-the-river
- Turbines: 2 × 3.5 MW
- Installed capacity: 7 MW
- Annual generation: 32 MU
- Website; Ullunkal Hydroelectric Project

The Allunkal Dam is a concrete diversion weir built across the Kakkad River in Chittar panchayat of Ranni taluk in Pathanamthitta district of the Indian state of Kerala. The dam is 121 metres (397 ft) long and 12 metres (39 ft) tall above the bed. It is part of the Ullunkal Hydroelectric Project, a small-scale private hydroelectric project operated by EDCL Power Projects Limited, a subsidiary of Energy Development Company Limited (EDCL).

== Access ==
The dam is located about 3.2 km (2.0 mi) from the nearest town of Chittar, 4.7 km (2.9 mi) from Seethathodu and 33 km (21 mi) from the district headquarters in Pathanamthitta. Chengannur is the nearest railway station, about 52 km (32 mi) away.

== Project history ==
In 1994, the project was allotted to Travancore Electro Chemical Industries Limited (TECIL), and later, it was taken over by Energy Development Company Limited (EDCL). The project was commissioned in November 2008 by then-Electricity Minister A.K. Balan. The contract with the government is for 30 years. The electricity generated is paid by the company to Kerala State Electricity Board (KSEB). In addition to the Ullunkal project, EDCL has the Karikkayam Hydroelectric Project in the Kakkad River downstream of the Allunkal dam, with an installed capacity of 15 MW (3 × 5 MW). It is operated by Ayyappa Hydro Power Limited, which is a subsidiary of EDCL. The Ullunkal project site was heavily damaged during the 2018 Kerala floods, resulting in a loss of around ₹ 25 crore.

== Power generation ==
The power station is located near the dam on the bank of the Kakkad River. It has a total installed capacity of 7 MW with two 3.5 MW S-type Kaplan turbines. The annual production of electricity at the plant is about 32 million units (MU). The electricity generated at the Allunkal power house is distributed to KSEB's Kakkad power station switch yard at Seethathodu through a dedicated 4 km (2.5 mi) long double-circuit transmission line. After the generation of electricity in the power house, water is released directly into the Kakkad River through a tailrace channel, and the tailwater is collected at the power house in Karikkayam for further power generation.

== See also ==
- List of dams and reservoirs in Kerala
