= M. V. Subbiah =

Indian industrialist

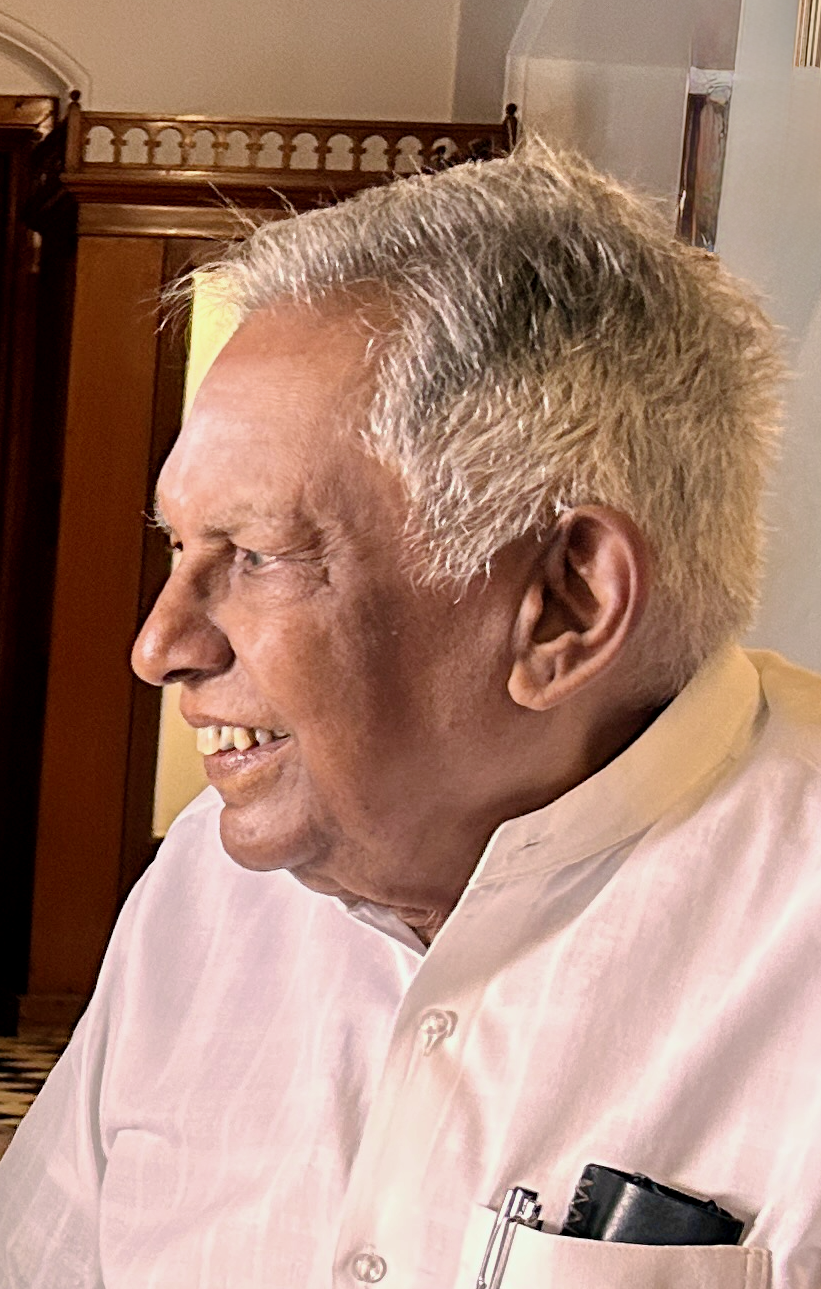
- at his house in Pallathur 2025
- Born: 2 February 1939 (age 87); Pallathur, Tamil Nadu, India
- Education: Aston University (Diploma) Harvard Business School (PMD)
- Occupations: Industrialist, Philanthropist
- Known for: Chairman of the Murugappa Group, Chairman of National Skill Development Corporation (NSDC)
- Children: 3 (1 son, 2 daughters)
- Awards: Padma Bhushan (2012)

M. V. Subbiah (born 2 February 1939) is an Indian industrialist and the former Executive Chairman of the Murugappa Group, a multi-billion dollar conglomerate based in Chennai. He is widely recognized for his role in professionalizing family business governance in India and for his tenure as the Chairman of the National Skill Development Corporation (NSDC) from 2008 to 2013. In 2012, he was awarded the Padma Bhushan, India's third-highest civilian honor, for his contributions to trade and industry.

== Early life and heritage ==
Subbiah was born on 2 February 1939 in Pallathur, Tamil Nadu, into the Nattukottai Chettiar mercantile community. He is the grandson of Dewan Bahadur A. M. Murugappa Chettiar, who founded the family's business in 1900 in Moulmein, Burma. The family's early business strategy emphasized diversification and capital preservation, which proved critical during World War II when they repatriated profits to India to invest in rubber plantations and manufacturing. He is known to be very passionate about working for and with the local community.

=== Education and "shop floor" philosophy ===
Subbiah studied engineering at the University of Birmingham for two years. While he did not graduate from the engineering program, he completed a Diploma in Industrial Administration from Aston University. In 1971, he attended the Program for Management Development (PMD) at Harvard Business School.

== Industrial turnarounds ==
Subbiah earned a reputation as a leader capable of revitalizing ailing industrial units through financial discipline and labor negotiation.

=== TI Cycles of India ===
In the 1970s, TI Cycles of India faced a crisis of identity and profitability due to competition from northern Indian manufacturers and severe labor unrest. Subbiah addressed the labor stalemate by introducing productivity-linked wages and shifted the company's focus toward premium "special" bicycles, such as racing bikes and ladies' bicycles (e.g., the BSA Aristocrat), which allowed the company to command higher margins.

=== EID Parry ===
Acquired by the Murugappa Group in 1981, EID Parry was a "sick unit" struggling with massive debt and operational inefficiency. Subbiah spearheaded its revival by implementing a rigorous restructuring program. He famously rejected traditional executive perks, such as private dining rooms, to foster equality within the organization. Under his leadership, EID Parry transformed into the most profitable sugar manufacturer in southern India, expanding into bio-energy and sustainable agri-products.

== Corporate governance and professionalization ==
In 1999, Subbiah initiated a radical restructuring of the Murugappa Group’s governance framework. He recognized that post-liberalization challenges required a shift from family-led management to professionalized oversight.

He created the Murugappa Corporate Board (MCB), integrating independent directors with family members. In 2001, he made the landmark decision to step down as Chairman, handing over leadership to N. S. Raghavan, a non-family professional and co-founder of Infosys. This "positive rebellion" against traditional Indian business norms was intended to institutionalize transparency and meritocracy.

=== Trusteeship philosophy ===
Central to Subbiah's model was the concept of "trusteeship," rooted in the ideas of Mahatma Gandhi. Under this philosophy, the family viewed the business as a resource held in trust for stakeholders rather than personal property. This led to the development of a formal Family Constitution and a Family Council to ensure that succeeding generations viewed their roles as stewards.

== National leadership and skill development ==
Subbiah served as the President of the Association of Indian Engineering Industries, which evolved into the Confederation of Indian Industry (CII).

In 2008, he was appointed Chairman of the National Skill Development Corporation (NSDC). He advocated for the "German model" of vocational training and the "Gurukul" system for holistic education, arguing that India's system was overly focused on theoretical degrees. During his tenure (2008–2013), he focused on creating sustainable ecosystems for skill development across India.

== Philanthropy ==
AMM Foundation

Healthcare: The foundation manages the AMM Hospital in Pallathur (celebrated its centenary in 2024), known as a "one rupee" hospital, and the Sir Ivan Stedeford Hospital in Avadi.

Education: Notable institutions include the Murugappa Polytechnic College (an academically autonomous technical college) and the AMM School in Chennai.

Environment: The foundation's "Nanneer Project" focuses on the restoration of water bodies in Tamil Nadu, benefiting thousands of farmers.

== Awards and recognition ==
1988: National HRD Award

2001: AIMA-JRD Tata Corporate Leadership Award

2011: Honorary Doctorate (DUniv) from the University of Birmingham

2012: Padma Bhushan by the Government of India

2014: Gatekeeper of Governance award by Excellence Enablers

== Succession and family arrangement ==
Subbiah's son has emerged as a key figure in the group's modern expansion, particularly through the successful turnaround of CG Power. In 2024, the Murugappa family engaged in a landmark family arrangement to resolve ownership disputes and split the group into distinct entities, ensuring long-term sustainability and family amity.
