= Maniyar =

Maniyar parshuram nagari Muniwar
- Town
- Nickname: Maniar
- Location in Uttar Pradesh, India
- Coordinates: 25°48′50″N 84°02′02″E
- Country: India
- State: Uttar Pradesh
- District: Ballia

Population (2001)
  - Total: 18,750

Languages
  - Official: bhojpuri
- Time zone: UTC+5:30 (IST)

Maniyar is a town and a Nagar Panchayat in Ballia district in the Indian state of Uttar Pradesh. It is also called Parshuram Nagari.

The name is derived from the word Muniwar. It was called the land of saints and monks. The Hindu god Parshuram was said to have meditated there for a long time. Maharshi Parshuram Dham temple was built there in the 16th century.

Maniyar is situated on the banks of Saryu or Ghaghra river.

== Nawka Baba ==
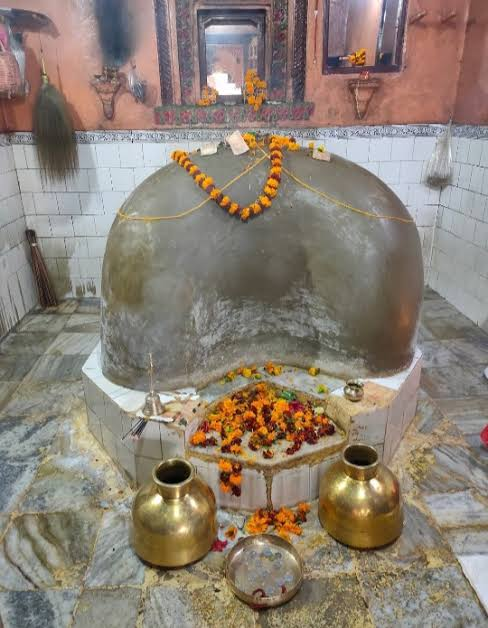
The Pind of twin brothers known as 'Nawka Baba'

Nawka Baba temple is one of the best known temples. The temple is known for its spirits, which are said to leave people's bodies as they enter the temple due to black magic. A pond is nearby. A fair is held in April and October. Pilgrims worship at Nawka Baba and Sataku Baba, another small temple 100 meters from Nawka Baba. Sataku Baba, also known as Bhudhwa Baba temple, is known for the same reasons as Nawka Baba.

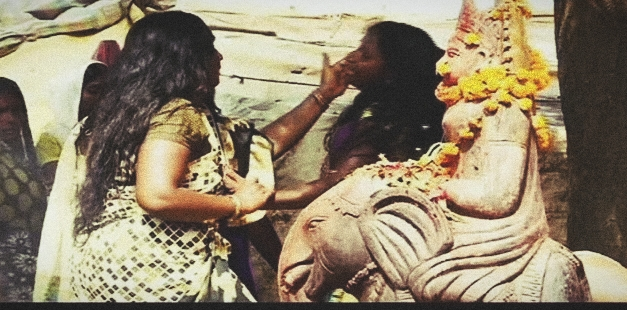
"Bhoot khelna" ritual at Nawka Baba Temple

== Parshuram Dham ==
Parshuram temple was built in the 16th century of lakhauri bricks with old plaster. Architectural elements can be seen on it and, according to some locals, Lord Parshuram meditated there. Small temples surround the complex. Barahdwari (or twelve gateways) was built by traders Lachhu Bhagat and Billar Bhagat in the 18th century. Miniature paintings were made on the ceilings, but cannot be seen because locals painted over them.

== Jhalak Baba ki Mathiya ==
This mathiya belongs to Das Tradition. "Baba Jhalak Das" is a Saint of Das Tradition Mahanth in this mathiya in the 20th century. He was born in 1927 in a Suhwal village near Sahtwar. Tapsi Das Jamuna Das Narayan Das was formerly Mahanth. In this mathia Thakur Ji and lord Shambhushek shivlinga established by Baba Jhalakdas.

== Demographics ==
As of 2001 India census, Maniyar had a population of 18,750. Males constitute 51% of the population, and females made up 49 %. Maniyar has an average literacy rate of 47 %, lower than the national average of 59.5 %. Male literacy is 57 %, and female literacy is 36 %. 18 % of the population is under 6.

== Other places with same name ==
In Kerala, one Maniyar is a village in Kollam district. Another Maniyar is a village in Pathanamthitta district. A nearby dam has the same name.
