= Tube Investments of India Limited =

Indian manufacturing company

- Type: Public
- Traded as: BSE: 540762; NSE: TIINDIA
- ISIN: INE974X01010
- Industry: Engineering
- Founded: 1949
- Headquarters: Avadi, Chennai, Tamil Nadu, India
- Key people: Arun Murugappan
- Products: Bicycles, automotive chains, car door frames, steel tubes, TMT bars
- Revenue: ▲₹12,070 crore (US$1.3 billion) (FY22)
- Operating income: ▲₹1,098.10 crore (US$110 million) (FY22)
- Net income: ▲₹746.16 crore (US$77 million) (FY22)
- Parent: Murugappa Group
- Website: www.tiindia.com

Tube Investments of India Limited is an Indian engineering and manufacturing company that specializes in bicycles, metal formed products, and chains. It is based in Chennai and a part of Murugappa Group. It was incorporated as TI Cycles of India Limited in 1949, as a joint venture company.

== History ==
- 1949: Established TI Cycles of India Limited (present day Tube Investments of India Limited) in association with Tube Investments Limited, UK (present day TI Group)
- 1955: Established Tube Products of India Limited in association with Tube Products (Old Bury) Limited, UK
- 1960:

- Established TI Diamond Chains Limited in association with Diamond Chain Company (Usa)
- Established TI Miller in association with Miller, UK

- 1965: Established TI Metal Forming
- 1990: Acquired Press Metal Corporation
- 1993: TIDC acquired Satavahana Chains
- 1999: TPI acquired Steel Strips And Tubes Limited
- 2001:

- TII acquired Cholamandalam Investment and Finance Company Limited
- Established Cholamandalam MS General Insurance Company Ltd

- 2010: TI India acquired French chain manufacturer Sedis
- 2012: Tube Investments bought a 44.12% controlling stake in Coimbatore-based Shanthi Gears for ₹ 292 crore.
- 2014:, the large diameter tubing plant was inaugurated
- 2023: Tube Investments and Premji Invest, an investment company owned by Azim Premji, jointly acquired Lotus Surgicals, a medical and surgical consumables company, with Tube Investments acquiring a 67% ownership and Premji Invest acquiring the remaining 33%. Lotus Surgicals was renamed as TI Medical.
- 2023: the company established 3xper Innoventure, a subsidiary for contract development and manufacturing (CDMO) of active pharmaceutical ingredients.

== Divisions ==
The major divisions are:

- TI Cycles of India (TICI)
- BSA Motors (BSAM)
- Tube Products of India (TPI)
- TI Diamond Chains (TIDC)
- TI Metal Forming (TIMF)
- Shanti Gears
- TI TMT Macho

=== TI Cycles of India ===
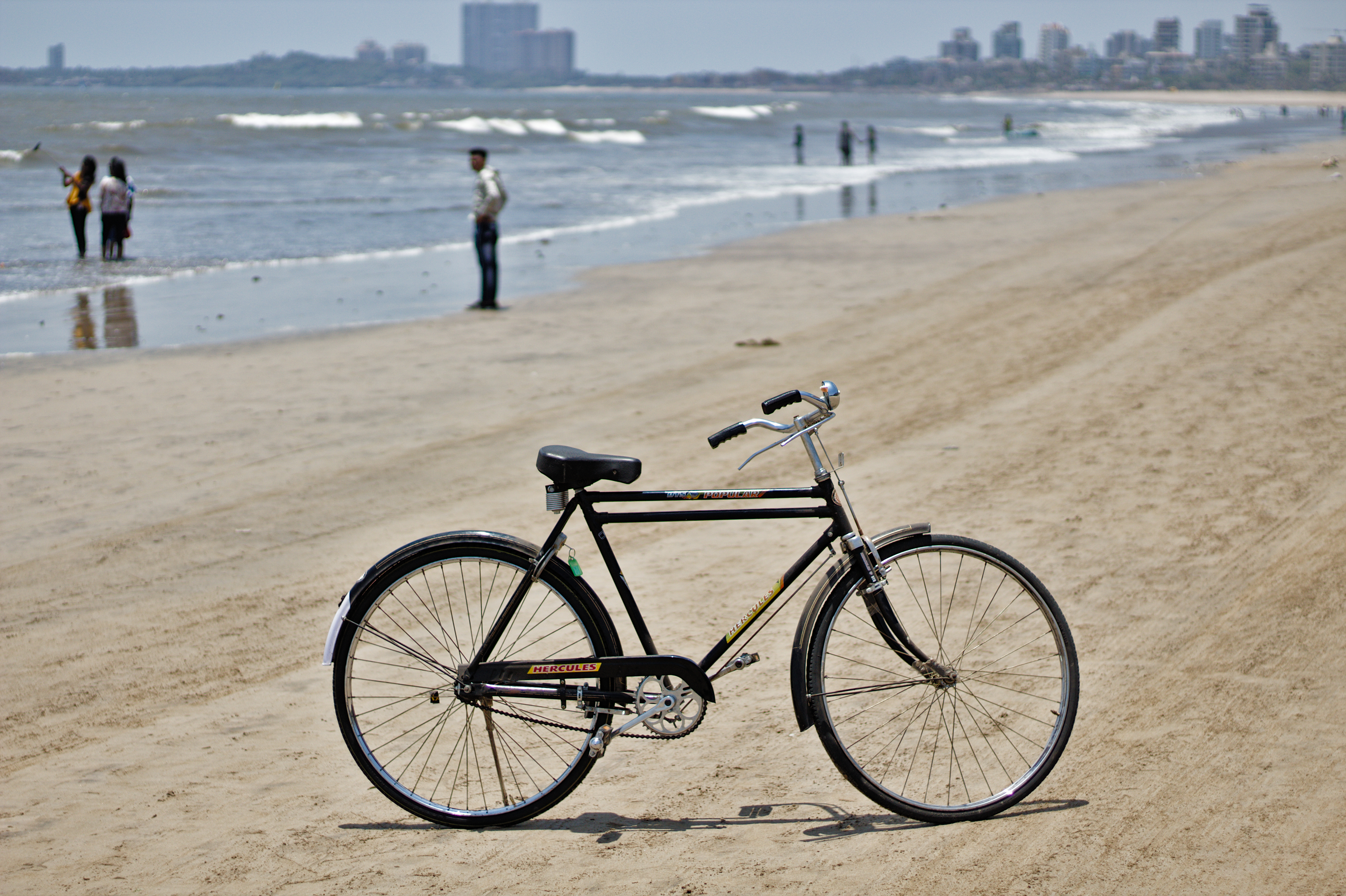
Hercules cycle on a beach in Mumbai

TI Cycles of India (a unit of Tube Investments of India Ltd.) is a bicycle manufacturer based in India. Established in 1949 by the Murugappa Group and Sir Ivan Stedeford of Tube Investments Group in UK, TI Cycles is the maker of brands including Hercules, BSA and Philips cycles. It has a manufacturing capacity of around three million bicycles per year. TI Cycles has sponsored including the 900+ km Tour of Nilgiris, through its brand BSA.

TI Cycles of India brands:

- TI Cycles
- BSA
- Hercules
- Philips Cycles
- Track & Trail
- Montra Electric
- Roadeo

Track and Trail India is an initiative of TI Cycles India with the objective to bring brands such as Bianchi, Schwinn, Cannondale, Ducati, etc. to the Indian market.

TI Cycles of India has manufacturing plants at:

- Ambattur, Chennai
- Nasik, Maharashtra
- Noida, Uttar Pradesh
- Rajpura, Punjab

=== Tube Products of India (TPI) ===
Tube Products of India (TPI) is a steel tubes manufacturer based in India. Tube Products of India was established in the year 1955 in collaboration with Tube Products (Old Bury) Limited, UK to produce Electric resistance welding (ERW) and Cold Drawn Welded (CDW) tubes also called as Drawn Over Mandrel tubes.

The manufacturing locations of Tube Products of India are located at:

- Avadi, Chennai, Tamil Nadu
- Shirwal, Maharashtra
- Mohali, Punjab
- Tiruttani, Tamil Nadu (Large Diameter Plant)

=== BSA Motors ===
BSA Motors is a manufacturer of non-pollutant electric vehicles. It has its manufacturing plant in Avadi, Tiruvallur district.

=== TI Diamond Chains ===
TI Diamond Chains, simply known as TIDC India, was established as a joint venture between Tube Investments of India Limited & Diamond Chain Company Inc USA. Tube Investments of India Limited merged it with as a division called TIDC India. TIDC India is a chain manufacturer in segments such as industrial, automotive and fine blanking.

TIDC India's manufacturing plants are:

- TIDC India, 11, M. T. H Road, Ambattur, Tiruvallur district.
- Gangnouli, Laksar, Haridwar, Uttrakhand.
- Kazipally Village, Jinnaram Mandal, Medak District, Telangana.

=== TI Metal Forming ===
TI Metal Forming was established in 1965 as a division of Tube Investments of India Limited. It manufactures car door frame (skin parts), glass separator channels, door guide rails (stainless steel), window channels, side impact beams, casing for starter motor (deep drawn part), HCV chassis and CRF sections for railway wagons and coaches.

TI Metal Forming's manufacturing plants:

- Thiruninravur, Tiruvallur district
- Bawal, Rewari district, Haryana
- Sanand, Ahmedabad district, Gujarat
- Halol, Panchmahal district, Gujarat
- Kakkalur, Tiruvallur district
- Laksar, Haridwar District, Uttrakhand

=== Montra Electric ===
Montra Electric is a three-wheeler brand introduced by TI Clean Mobility Private Limited for unveiling its revolutionary electric three-wheeler vehicle “Super Auto”. TI Clean Mobility Private Limited is a wholly owned subsidiary of Tube Investments of India Limited (Initially established as TI Cycles of India Limited, Madras), a Murugappa Group Company, effective from 12 February 2022. The company is engaged in the manufacturing and marketing of electric three-wheelers in the passenger auto and cargo segments.

Montra Electric is an Indian company that manufactures electric commercial vehicles. It is part of TI Clean Mobility, which belongs to the Murugappa Group. What Montra Electric makes Electric 3-wheelers (cargo autos for goods transport) Electric trucks for commercial logistics Last-mile delivery vehicles used for city deliveries

The truck segment of Montra Electric mainly focuses on heavy electric commercial trucks used for logistics, mining, ports, and long-haul transport.

Montra Electric Truck Segment

1️⃣ Rhino Series (Heavy-Duty Electric Trucks) The main truck lineup is the Montra Rhino 5538 EV.

Key details

Type: Heavy electric tractor-trailer Gross Combination Weight: ~55 tons Battery: 282 kWh LFP battery Power: ~380 HP Torque: ~2000 Nm Range: Around 190–200 km per charge Transmission: 6-speed AMT Variants: 4×2 and 6×4 tractor trailer

Special feature

Battery swapping option (battery change in a few minutes) besides normal charging.

2️⃣ Applications

These trucks are used for: Cement and steel transport Mining operations Port container movement Long-haul freight logistics

3️⃣ Manufacturing The heavy electric trucks are produced at the Manesar (Haryana) facility near Gurugram.

== Subsidiaries ==
- Sedis Chains France
- CG Power and Industrial Solutions
- TI Medical
- 3xper Innoventure

== See also ==
- Cholamandalam Investment and Finance Company
- Cholamandalam MS General Insurance
