= Morgan Advanced Materials =

Manufacturer of advanced ceramic, carbon and composite products

Morgan Advanced Materials plc
- Formerly: The Morgan Crucible Company plc (1934–2013)
- Company type: Public limited company
- Traded as: LSE: MGAM; FTSE 250 component
- Industry: Manufacturing
- Founded: 1856
- Headquarters: York House, Sheet Street, Windsor, Berkshire, United Kingdom
- Key people: Ian Marchant (Chairman); Damien Caby (CEO)
- Revenue: ▼£996.6 million (2025)
- Operating income: ▼£92.8 million (2025)
- Net income: ▼£28.8 million (2025)
- Number of employees: 8,100 (2026)
- Website: morganadvancedmaterials.com

Morgan Advanced Materials plc is a company which manufactures specialist products, using carbon, advanced ceramics and composites. The group is headquartered in Windsor, United Kingdom, and has 57 operating sites worldwide. It is listed as public limited company on the London Stock Exchange and is a constituent of the FTSE 250 Index.

== History ==
=== From formation to flotation ===
The six Morgan brothers (William, Thomas, Walter, Edward, Octavius and Septimus) began as importers and exporters in the City of London trading as "Druggist Salesmen and Hardware Merchants". An American crucible, made to a new process, was shown at the Great Exhibition of 1851 and seen by the brothers. The distinguishing feature of the “new process” involved mixing the clay with graphite, then usually known as plumbago or black lead, giving it much greater durability. The brothers obtained the sole agency for the British Empire from the manufacturers, Joseph Dixon, and in 1856 formed the Patent Plumbago Crucible Company, acquiring a site in Battersea for its manufacture. One of the features of the early years was extensive international scope of the business, both in the marketing of the crucible and the search for the ideal graphite – first in Ceylon and then Madagascar. By the 1870s, the firm, then trading under the easier name of Morgan Crucible, was said to be the largest manufacturer of crucibles in the world.

In 1890, Morgan Crucible became a company; it was no longer a family concern although the shares remained in the hands of directors and senior executives, and it remained so until 1946. By 1900, the staff at Battersea totalled over 420 and the company was continually exploring other avenues for its graphite expertise. In the early 1900s lengthy development work was undertaken on electric brushes and by the end of World War I it was an established part of the business. Other refractory products, including furnace linings, were developed and in 1947 production moved to a new factory in Neston as Morgan Refractories. Other carbon specialisations included lighting carbons and resistors, the latter being large enough to move into a new factory in County Durham in 1948.

At the private AGM in August 1946, the Chairman announced "a departure from our 60-year-old policy of retaining the whole of the equity in the hands of workers and ex workers." There was to be a public listing on the London Stock Exchange with the issue of new shares but it was expected that the employees would still control the majority of the equity. The fundraising was duly completed the next month; the company was described as the largest manufacturer of plumbago crucibles in the world and also holding “a leading position as manufacturers of carbon products used on rotating electrical equipment”.

=== Flotation to late 20th century ===
In 1939 the company's subsidiary Morganite Crucible opened its works at Norton in Worcestershire. During the Second World War this facility employed European Voluntary Workers who were accommodated at Bowbrook House in nearby Peopleton. In 2010 the site, which had recently been closed, was sold for use as an industrial estate; in part of the site, Molten Metal Products Ltd was set up by former Morgan employees Dave Hill and Jim Ritchie, to distribute Morganite products and manufacture Morgan furnaces under licence.

In 1954 the company became one of the first businesses in the UK to computerise its financial records, with the first order of a HEC4 computer, operational in 1955. In 1964 the first commercial sale of the ICT 1900 series computer was to the company.

In 1964 the company acquired Steatite & Porcelain Products from Imperial Chemical Industries (ICI): this company, based in Stourport, had been established as Ernst Hildebrant Limited in 1907 and had been owned by ICI in 1941.

A joint venture of Morgan's Thermal Ceramics division and the Carborundum Universal company, part of the Indian industrial conglomerate Murugappa Group, has existed since 1982.

=== 21st century ===
The company changed its name to Morgan Advanced Materials in February 2013 to reflect the fact that it produces a variety of different products and supplies to many different industries.

In September 2020 the company's headquarters moved from the Quadrant to York House, also in the centre of Windsor.

In February 2023, the company announced that it had been hit by a cyber-security incident which had taken some of its systems offline and may cost it up to £12 million.

In October 2025, a large part of the former Molten Metal Systems business unit was sold to the British group Vesuvius for US$108.7 million.

== Corporate structure ==
Until 2023 the group was divided into five business units: Thermal Ceramics (23 locations), Molten Metal Systems (5 locations), Electrical Carbon (16 locations), Seals and Bearings (11 locations) and Technical Ceramics (17 locations).

At the beginning of 2024, the five business units were merged into three segments. Thermal Ceramics and Molten Metal Systems became Thermal Products, Performance Carbon was formed from Electrical Carbon and around 90 % of Seals and Bearings, and Technical Ceramics and around 10 % of Seals and Bearings became the Technical Ceramics segment.

In 2021, 27.4 percent of employees worked in the United States of America, 28.5 percent in Europe (UK: 9.5 percent) and about 14 percent in China.

A total of four (global) development centers (Centre of Excellence, CoE) have been opened since 2008:

- Insulating Fibre (2008), Bromborough, United Kingdom
- Structural Ceramics (2015), Stourport-on-Severn, United Kingdom
- Metals and Joining (2016), Hayward, California, United States of America
- Carbon Science (2018), State College, Pennsylvania, United States of America
