= Manakkayam =

- village
- Location in Kerala, India Manakkayam (India)
- Coordinates: 9°45′0″N 77°10′0″E
- Country: India
- State: Kerala
- District: Idukki

Government
  - Type: Panchayath
  - Body: Chittar grama panchayath

Languages
  - Official: Malayalam, English
- Time zone: UTC+5:30 (IST)
- Area code: 04735
- Vehicle registration: KL-62
- Nearest cities: Chittar, Seethathodu

Manakkayam is a small village located near Chittar in Pathanamthitta district of Kerala state, India. It lies on the Puthukkada - Chittar road, about 5 kilometres (3.1 mi) from Puthukkada, 3 kilometres (1.9 mi) from Chittar and 7 kilometres (4.3 mi) from Seethathodu.
