= Pallathur =

- Village
- Location in Tamil Nadu, India
- Coordinates: 10.1448°N 78.8061°E
- Country: India
- State: Tamil Nadu
- District: Sivagangai

Population (2001)
  - Total: 7,840

Languages
  - Official: Tamil
- Time zone: UTC+5:30 (IST)

Pallathur is a village in Sivagangai district in the Indian state of Tamil Nadu.

== Demographics ==
As of 2001 India census, Pallathur had a population of 7840. Males constitute 49% of the population and females 51%. Pallathur has an average literacy rate of 73%, higher than the national average of 59.5%: male literacy is 78%, and female literacy is 69%. In Pallathur, 11% of the population is under 6 years of age.

== Educational institutions ==
- RMM. Girls High School
- Arunachalm Chettiar Hr. Sec. School
- Annamalai Polytechnic, Chettinad
- Alagammai Achi Memorial School
- Seethai Achi School
- Agricultural College and Research Institute (AC&RI)
- Seethalakshmi Achi College for Women
