= Carborundum Universal =

Indian materials science company

Carborundum Universal Limited (CUMI)
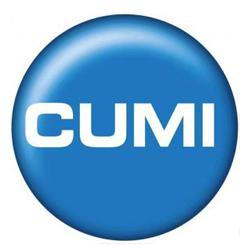
- Company type: Public
- Traded as: NSE: CARBORUNIV; BSE: 513375
- Industry: Engineering
- Founded: 1954
- Headquarters: Chennai, Tamil Nadu, India
- Key people: M. M. Murugappan
- Products: Abrasives, electro minerals, industrial ceramics, super refractories;
- Revenue: ▲₹4,731 crore (US$490 million) (FY23)
- Net income: ▲₹413 crore (US$43 million) (FY23)
- Parent: Murugappa Group
- Website: www.cumi-murugappa.com

Carborundum Universal Ltd (CUMI) is an Indian company which manufactures and develops abrasives, ceramics, refractories, aluminium oxide grains, machine tools, polymers, adhesives and electro minerals in India. It is a part of the Murugappa Group.

The company has subsidiaries in India, Russia, South Africa, Australia, China, Thailand and Canada.

== History ==
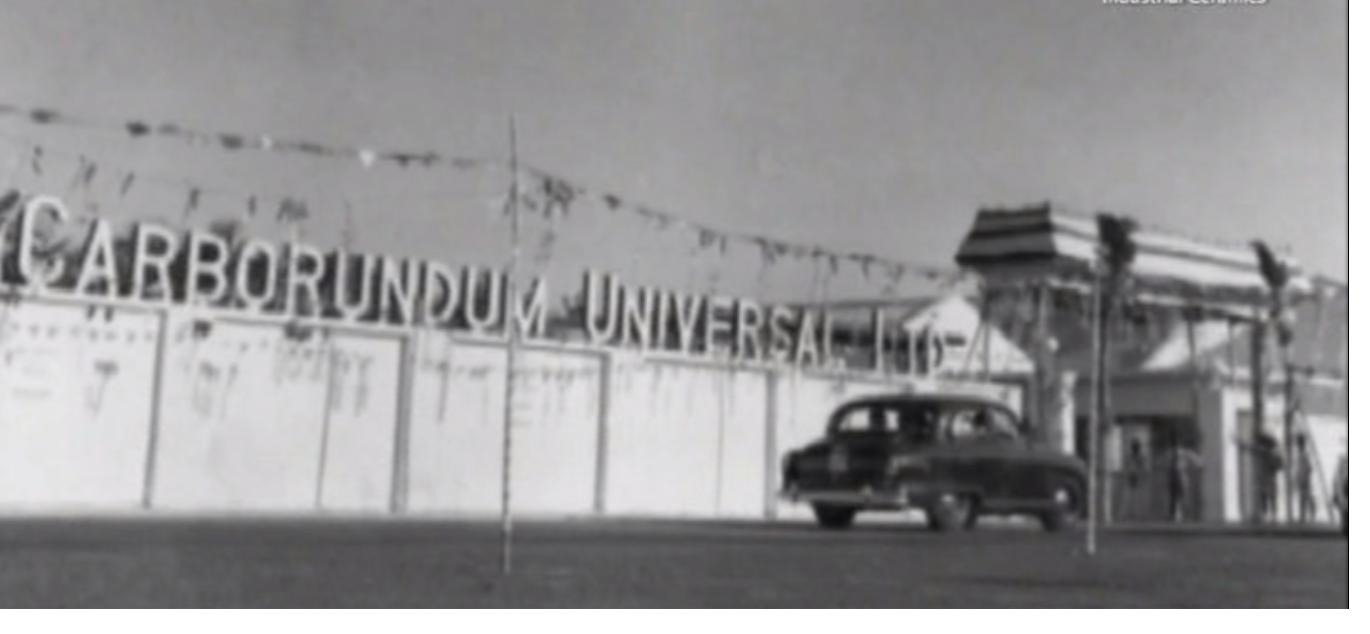
CUMI-1954

CUMI was established as a result of diversification from banking business through cycle manufacturing with the intent to manufacture abrasive materials. CUMI's parent company, the Murugappa Group, made a tie up with Carborundum UK, a subsidiary of American abrasive manufacturer, Carborundum and the Universal Grinding Co. Ltd. UK in 1950. The result was the Carborundum Universal of Madras. Then it was renamed and incorporated in 1954 as Carborundum Universal Ltd (CUMI).

=== Establishments ===
Initially CUMI was founded to manufacture the core products for the collaborating companies. Later the company established its first bonded abrasive plant at Chennai with the facility acquired from Ajax Products and began its manufacturing in the abrasives platform. With the intention of producing technical ceramics for high temperature insulation products CUMI has made joint venture with Morgan Crucible Plc. UK resulted in the establishment of Murugappa Morgan Thermal Ceramics Ltd in 1982.

The company has laid a strong foundation in engineered ceramics through number of joint ventures. In 1991 Wendt (India) Ltd, a joint ventured company of Wendt GmbH, Germany and The House of Khataus, was merged with the CUMI. CUMI's first industrial ceramics division was established in Hosur, Tamil Nadu as a technical partnership with Coors Ceramics, USA in 1991. Later it was expanded with the unique Metallized Cylinders Plant.

As a part of expanding their presence, in 2005 the company started CUMI Middle East FZE in Ras Al Khaimah. In order to strengthen their global presence CUMI bought Abrasive Enterprises Inc., Canada, for $2.24 Million by 2006. After a year CUMI established CUMI International Ltd in Cyprus.

=== Acquisitions ===
Within a decade, after the withdrawal of the collaborators, CUMI acquired Ajax Products Pvt Ltd. CUMI stepped up its investment in abrasive industries by acquiring the Eastern Abrasives Ltd., Kolkata in 1978. In 1997, Cutfast Abrasive Tools Ltd., Eastern Abrasives Ltd., Cutfast Polymers Ltd. and Carborundum Universal Investment merged with Carborundum Universal Ltd. Within a year of acquisition of Sterling Abrasives Ltd. and SEDCO in 2003, CUMI acquired CUMI Australia Pty Ltd. In 2007 the company took over the Chinese firm, Sanhe Yanjiao Jingri Diamond Industrial Company Ltd., and the Russian Volzhsky Abrasive Works. Further acquisitions followed in 2008, including Foskor Zirconia Ltd., South Africa which became a subsidiary of CUMI.

=== Diversification ===
Besides manufacturing, marketing and distribution, CUMI is also involved in diversified works like mining, power generation and TOT agreements with various organizations.

CUMI acquired Bauxite mines at Bhatia and Okha in Gujarat, a Silicon Carbide plant in Koratty, Kerala and a brown Aluminium Oxide grains plant at Edapally, Kerala. CUMI established a 12MW hydroelectric power plant at Maniyar, Kerala in 1994. and a 5.5MW Wind mill at Nallur.

CUMI made a technology transfer with Answer Technology Inc., USA for advanced monolithics and a technical collaboration with National Institute for Interdisciplinary Science and Technology of India, Bhabha Atomic Research Centre of India and Pennsylvania State University of USA for the development of advanced ceramic technology.

CUMI Direct

CUMI Direct is an online e-commerce platform that was started in 2005 and sells:

- Warehouse Equipment - Pallet Trucks, Stackers, Table Lifts, Movable Dock Ramps, Stationary Dock Levelers, Tail Lifts, Fork Lifts, Plastic Pallets, Caster Wheels
- Material Handling Equipment - Shopping Trolleys, Hand Carts
- Power Tools - CUMI Power Tools, METABO Power Tools
- Industrial Ceramics
- Electro Minerals
- Abrasives - Thin Wheels, Rolls, Grinding Wheels, Non Woven Wheels, Coated Abrasives, Porous Tiles, Super Abrasives, Resonoid and Rubber, Vitrified Ranges
- Metal Working Fluids - Cleaner, Forming Fluids, Neat Oils, Rust Preventives, Water Solubles
- Strapping Tools - Tensioners, Sealers
- Super Refractories products - Fired Refractories, Monolithic Products

Most of the products are granted CE and GS certificates.

== Major divisions ==
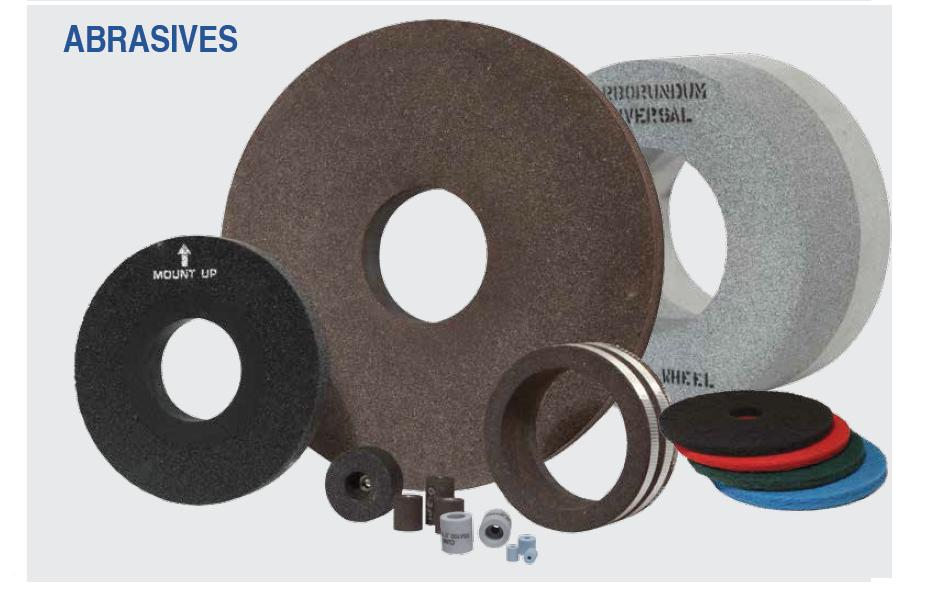
Bonded abrasives

The major divisions are:

- Abrasives
  - Coated Abrasives
  - Bonded Abrasives
- Electrominerals
- Ceramics
  - Industrial Ceramics
  - Super Refractories
- CUMI Direct (Online E-Commerce Platform)
  - Warehouse Equipment
  - Material Handling Equipment
  - Power-tools
  - Industrial Ceramics
  - Electro Minerals
  - Abrasives
  - Metal Working Fluids
  - Strapping Tools
  - Super Refractories products

== Product applications and materials ==
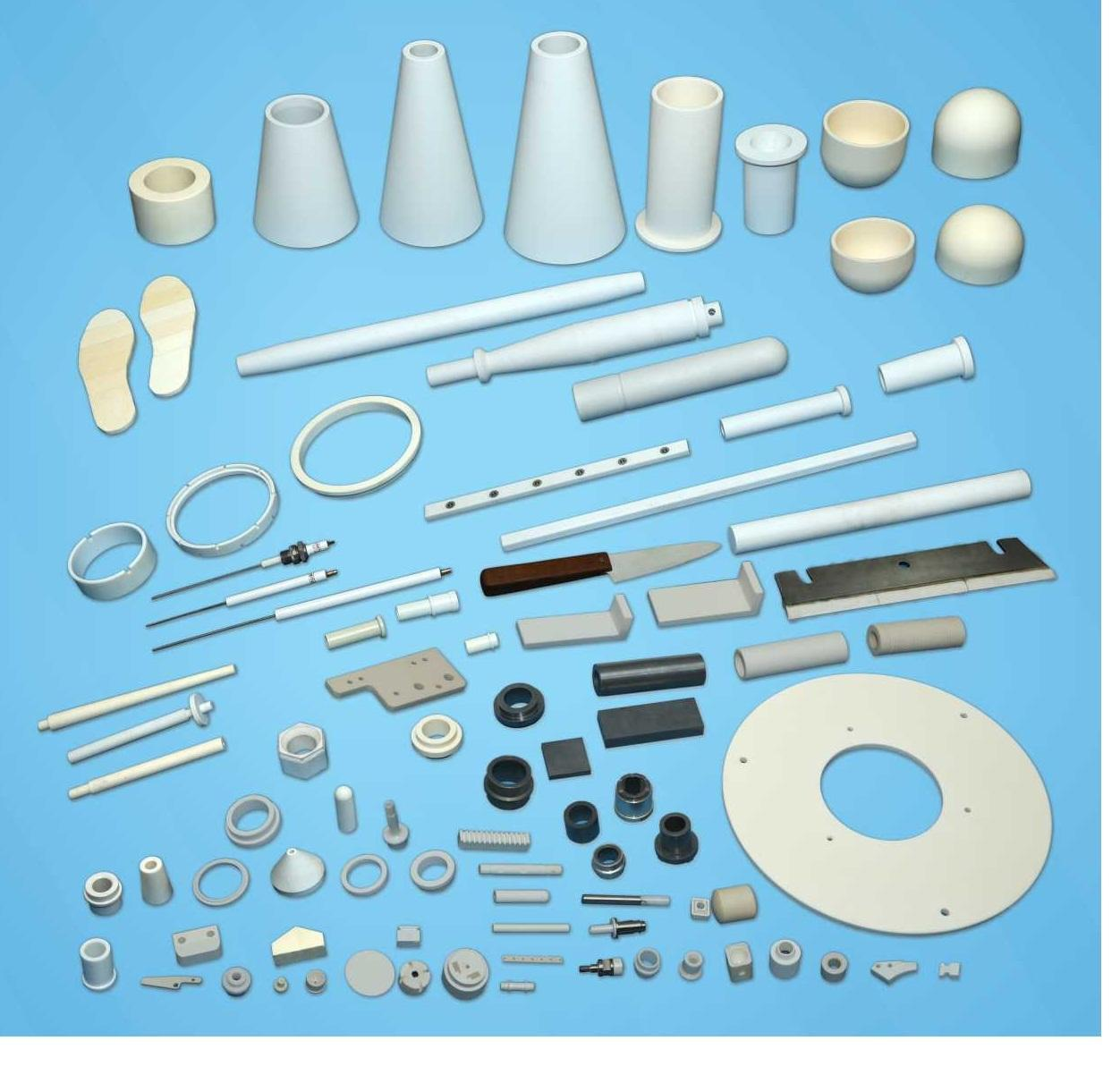
Advanced Ceramic Products

Different divisions create products with a range of applications, such as material removal, rough surface polishing and fine finishing by the Abrasives division; wear-resistant and heat-resistant liners and metallized ceramics by the Ceramics division; heat-resistant containment products from the Super Refractories division; and raw materials for abrasives and refractories by the Electrominerals division.

- Abrasives
  - Coated Abrasives
  - Bonded Abrasives
  - Processed Cloth
  - Polymer Resin
  - Metal Working Fluids
- Ceramics
  - High Alumina
  - Reaction bonded Silicon Carbide (RbSiC)
  - Yttria partially stabilized Zirconia (YPSZ)
  - Sintered Silicon Carbide
  - Zirconia
  - Al-Titanate
  - MgO-Partially stabilized Zirconia (MgPSZ)
- Electrominerals
  - Brown Fused Aluminum Oxide
  - White Fused Aluminum Oxide
  - Calcia Stabilized Zirconia
  - Ziconia Mullite
  - Alumina Bubble
  - Silicon Carbide
  - Calcined Bauxite
- Agri Input products
  - CUMIjal

== Joint ventures ==
- Wendt (India) Limited
- Murugappa Morgan Thermal Ceramics Ltd.
- Ciria India Limited

== Subsidiaries ==
- CUMI Abrasives and Ceramics China Limited (CACCL)
- CUMI America Inc.
- CUMI Australia Pty. Ltd. (CAPL)
- CUMI Canada Inc.
- CUMI International Limited, Cyprus
- CUMI Middle East FZE
- Cellaris Refractories India Limited
- Foskor Zirconia Pty Ltd-South Africa
- Net Access India Limited
- Southern Energy Development Corporation Limited (SEDCO)
- Sterling Abrasives Limited-Ahmedabad
- Pluss Advanced Technologies
- Volzhsky Abrasive Works-Russia

== See also ==
- Murugappa Group
