= Sanketam =

Temple corporations in medieval Kerala

Sanketam was the name given to temple corporations in medieval Kerala. Land grants given to Brahmins were organized into sanketams, which formed semi-autonomous, self governing bodies. According to M.T. Narayanan, the sanketam was the primary institution through which the Nambudiri Brahmins exerted their influence on the politics of Kerala.

They were the predominant landowning agency of the feudal age, exercising revenue and judicial power. In the region of the sanketam, all temporal authorities were exercised by the temple officials and the local chieftains wielded no control. M.T. Narayanan classifies sanketams as grama sanketams, which formed the original 32 Brahmin settlements of Kerala and kshetra sanketams, which referred to fresh settlements.

Shneider and Gough distinguish four types of temples among the upper castes of Kerala. The first of these were the temples belonging to sanketams, whose estates were managed by Nambudiris. These temples were dedicated to pan-India Hindu deities like Siva or Vishnu. Animal sacrifices were forbidden within the temples of the sanketams and they were restricted to the Brahmin population of the village. The priests of these temples were often lower ranking Nambudiri priests. A few temple-servant castes also used to live in these sanketams. Second were the private temples owned by Nambudiris which were smaller versions of the first. The third and fourth kinds of temples belonged to royal matrilineal lineages and the "common" Nair families and these were often dedicated to Bhagavathi or Bhadrakali.

== Governance ==
The governance of the temple-state was carried out by the body of the yogam, which consisted of the heads (eldest male) of all Brahmin households belonging to the designated region. These members (yogakkar) elected a committee of ooralans (heads of certain Nambudiri households) and a chief, who exercised supreme authority within the confines of the sanketam. The chief (sankethaadhikari) who was usually a kshatriya was appointed by the Brahmin head of the yogam (known as the yogathiri). In this way, the sanketam functioned independent of the existing political structure of the area (which may be ruled by a naduvazhi or a desavazhi).

A sanketam could also have several smaller satellite temples (keezhedams) operating under its nominal control, in which case, consent for certain events had to sought from the parent temple.

== Famous temple states of the pre-British era ==
- Padmanabhaswamy Temple
- Peruvanam Mahadeva Temple
- Thrissur Vadakkunnathan Temple
- Irinjalakkuda Koodalmanikyam Temple
- Sukapuram Dakshinamurthy Temple
- Guruvayoor Temple (whose parent temple/meledam was the famous Trikkanamathilakam temple
- Elamkunnappuzha Sanketham, Ernakulam District
- Thiruvalla Sanketham now in Patthanamthitta district.
- Trikkandiyoor maha Shiva temple, Tirur
