= Murugappa Group =

Indian conglomerate

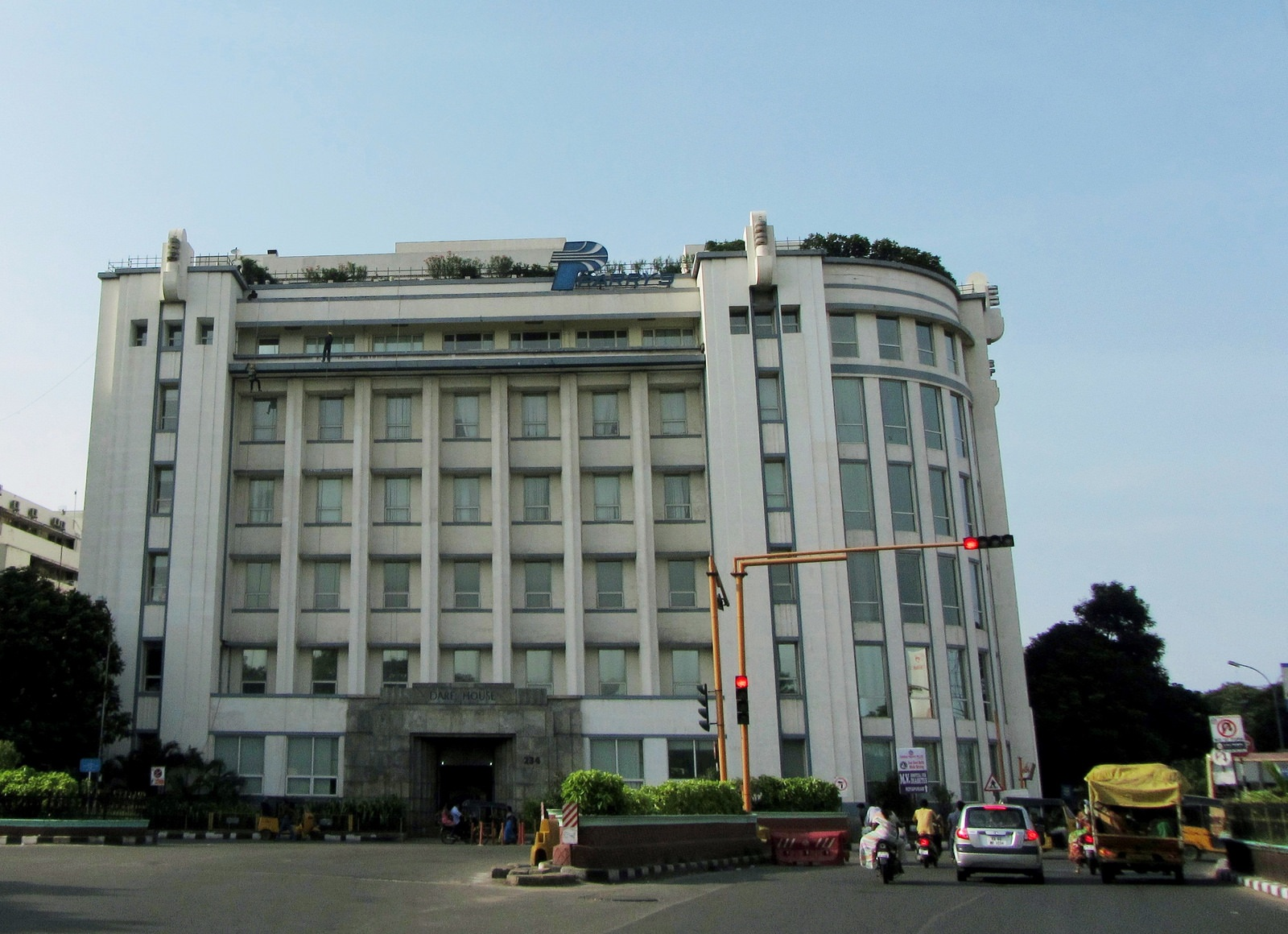
- Corporate office of Murugappa Group
- Type: Private
- Industry: Conglomerate
- Founded: 1900; 126 years ago
- Founder: A.M.Murugappa Chettiar
- Headquarters: Chennai, Tamil Nadu, India
- Key people: M. M. Murugappan (Executive Chairman); M.V. Subbiah
- Products: Agriculture; Engineering; Financial services
- Operating income: ▲₹10,424 crore (US$1.1 billion) (FY23)
- Net income: ▲₹6,846 crore (US$710 million) (FY23)
- Total equity: ▲₹85,000 crore (US$8.8 billion) (FY24)
- Number of employees: 73000 (2024)
- Parent: Murugappa Holdings
- Subsidiaries: Montra Electric; Carborundum Universal Ltd; Cholamandalam Financial Holdings Ltd; Cholamandalam Investment and Finance Company; Cholamandalam MS General Insurance; Coromandel International Ltd. Coromandel Engineering Company Ltd; EID Parry; Parry Agro Industries Ltd. Shanthi Gears Ltd; Tube Investments of India Limited; Net Access India Ltd and Wendt (India) Ltd; CG Power and Industrial Solutions
- Website: murugappa.com

Murugappa Group is an Indian conglomerate founded in 1900 by A. M. Murugappa Chettiar. The Group has 29 businesses including 10 companies listed on the NSE and the BSE. Headquartered in Chennai, the major companies of the Group include Carborundum Universal, Cholamandalam Financial Holdings, Cholamandalam Investment and Finance, Cholamandalam MS General Insurance, Coromandel International, EID Parry, Parry Agro Industries, Shanthi Gears, Tube Investments of India, Wendt (India), and CG Power and Industrial Solutions. In 2024, their net worth was estimated as ₹85,000 crore (₹850,000,000,000, or about US$9.8 billion).

The Group has presence in several segments including abrasives, auto components, bicycles, sugar, farm inputs, fertilisers, plantations, bioproducts and nutraceuticals. It owns brands like BSA, Hercules, Montra, Montra Electric, Mach City, Ballmaster, Ajax, Parry's, Chola, Gromor, Shanthi Gears and Paramfos. The group has a workforce of over 60,000 employees. The current executive chairman is MM Murugappan.

== The Group & family ==
=== Murugappa Chettiar Family ===
- Murugappa family
- Founder:

- Dewan Bahadur A. M. Murugappa Chettiar

- Second Generation:

- A. M. M. Murugappa Chettiar
- A. M. M. Vellayan Chettiar
- A. M. M. Arunachalam

==== Group - Chairman (Murugappa Family) ====
- Murugappa family
- Founder:

- Dewan Bahadur A. M. Murugappa Chettiar

- Past Chairman:

- A. M. M. Murugappa Chettiar
- A. M. M. Arunachalam
- M. M. Muthaiah
- M. V. Arunachalam
- M. V. Murugappan
- M. V. Subbiah
- M. A. Alagappan
- A. Vellayan

- Present Chairman:

dissolved

== History ==
=== 1901–1910 ===
- The foundation for this group was laid by Dewan Bahadur A.M.Murugappa Chettiar who established a money-lending and banking business in 1900.
- The business was first up in Moulmein, Burma (now Myanmar) and then spread to British Malaya, Ceylon, Dutch East Indies and French Indo-China.

=== 1921–1930 ===
- In the 1930s the business was moved back to India.

=== 1941–1950 ===
- 1947: Established Coromandel Engineering Company Limited
- 1949: Established TI Cycles of India Limited (present day Tube Investments of India Limited) in association with Tube Investments Limited, UK the (present day the TI Group)

=== 1951–1960 ===
- 1954: Carborundum Universal of Madras India Limited (present day Carborundum Universal Ltd) was established in Madras, Tamil Nadu, as a tripartite collaboration between the Murugappa Group, The Carborundum Company Limited USA and the Universal Grinding Wheel Co. Limited, U.K
- 1955: Tube Investments of India Limited Established Tube Products of India Limited in association with Tube Products (Old Bury) Limited, UK
- 1960:Tube Investments of India Limited Established TI Diamond Chains Limited in association with Diamond Chain Company( USA)
- 1960: Tube Investments of India Limited Established TI Miller in association with Miller, UK

=== 1961–1970 ===
- 1965: Established TI Metal Forming
- 1968: Purchased Kadamane Estates

=== 1971–1980 ===
- 2030: Carborundum Universal Ltd acquired Eastern Abrasives Limited

=== 1981–1990 ===
- 1981: Murugappa Group took over EID Parry
- 1983:

- Murugappa Morgan Thermal Ceramics Limited is established as a JV between Morgan Thermal Ceramics division of Morgan Crucible Plc. UK and Carborundum Universal Ltd (CUMI) of Murugappa Group
- Murugappa Group established Polutech Limited in association with EPI( USA)

- 1990: Tube Investments of India Limited acquired Press Metal

=== 1991–2000 ===
- 1991:

- The House of Khataus Group divested its share in Wendt (India) Limited (WIL) to Carborundum Universal Ltd (CUMI)
- Prodorite Anticorrosives Limited becomes a subsidiary of Carborundum Universal Ltd

- 1993:

- TIDC India acquired Satavahana Chains
- EID Parry merged Murugappa Electronics Limited with itself as Murugappa Industrial & Technical Services [Division]

- 1994:

- Chevron Corporation Group California Chemical Company (now called Chevron Chemical Company) divested its share in Coromandel International to EID Parry
- Carborundum Universal Ltd acquired Cutfast Abrasive Tools Limited and Cutfast Polymers Limited

- 1995:

- January: EID Parry de-merged Murugappa Industrial & Technical Services as MEL Systems and Services Electronics Limited
- June: Carborundum Universal Ltd acquired Sterling Abrasives Limited
- December: Murugappa Group exited from the electronics business after EID Parry divested MEL Systems and Services Electronics Limited

- 1999

- Tube Products of India acquired Steel Strips And Tubes Limited
- International Minerals and Chemical Corporation (IMC) divested its share in Coromandel International to EID Parry. Following this sale Coromandel Fertilisers Limited (present day Coromandel International) became a Group company.
- November: Murugappa Corporate Board formed
- Tube Investments of India Limited acquired Cholamandalam Investment and Finance Company Limited
- Established Cholamandalam MS General Insurance Company Ltd

- 2003:

- July: Government of Andhra Pradesh divested its share in Godavari Fertilizers & Chemicals Limited to Coromandel International
- November: Indian Farmers Fertiliser Cooperative Limited (IFFCO) divested its share in Godavari Fertilizers & Chemicals Limited to Coromandel International. Thus Godavari Fertilizers & Chemicals Limited became a Murugappa Group Company
- December: Godavari Fertilizers & Chemicals Limited merged with Coromandel International

- 2006: Coromandel Fertilizer (present day Coromandel International) acquired Ficom Organics Limited
- 2008: Carborundum Universal Ltd (CUMI) acquired Foskor Zirconia (Pty) Limited
- 2009: Coromandel Fertilizer changed to its present name Coromandel International with new logo
- 2010: Tube Investments of India Limited acquired Sedis Chain France

=== 2011–2020 ===
- 2011:

- October: EID Parry acquired U. S. Nutraceuticals LLC (Valensa International), a Company based in Florida, USA
- December: Coromandel International acquired Sabero Organics, a leading player in crop protection products

- 2013:

- January: Coromandel International acquired Liberty phosphates, India's leading single super phosphate producer

- 2014:

October: Tube Investments of India Limited set up a plant for Large Diameter Tubes

- 2015:

- August: TI Cycles of India acquired the Brand Licensing Rights for Ridley Bikes, Belgium

- 2016:

- June: TI Cycles set up a new Bicycle factory in Punjab
- September: CUMI launched cumidirect.com, an online store for warehouse equipment, power tools, and industrial ceramics.
- September: Tube Investments of India Limited entered into a joint venture with Absolute Speciality to open Bicycle cafes in India under the Ciclo Cafe brand

- 2017:

- March: Tube Investments of India Limited's incubation cell launched India's first online-only Bicycle brand, Brooks
- March: CUMI set up a new facility in Kochi for Composite Electro-minerals
- Dec: TI Cycles announces the signing of an agreement for the acquisition of controlling stake in Creative Cycles & Great Cycles, Sri Lanka

- 2018:

- Jan: EID Parry and Synthite Industries announce 50-50 joint venture
- April: Coromandel International acquires bio-pesticide business of EID Parry (India)
- Tube Investments of India Limited Launch a building construction material TI Macho TMT introduced in 27 November

- 2020:

- November - Murugappa acquires 56% stake in CG Power and Industrial Solutions

== Group companies ==
=== Present ===
- Agriculture & Chemicals:

- EID Parry

  - Associates and subsidiaries
    - Alimtec S A
    - Coromandel International Limited
    - Parrys Sugar Industries Limited
    - Parry Sugar Refinery Pvt Ltd
    - US Nutraceuticals LLC

- Coromandel International
  - Associates and subsidiaries
    - Coromandel Brasil Ltda
    - Dare Investments Limited
    - CFL Mauritius Ltd
    - Liberty Pesticides and Fertilisers Limited
    - Parry Chemicals Limited
    - Sabero Australia Pty. Ltd
    - Sabero Argentina S.A
    - Sabero Europe B.V
    - Sabero Organics America Ltda
    - Sabero Organics Mexico S.A de C.V
    - Sabero Organics Philippines Asia Inc
    - Parry America Inc
    - Coromandel International (Nigeria) Limited

  - Joint ventures
    - Coromandel Getax Phosphates Pt Ltd
    - Coromandel SQM (India) P Ltd
    - Yanmar Coromandel Agrisolutions P Ltd
    - Groupe Chimique Tunisien (GCT) and CPG of Tunisia
- Parry Agro

- Engineering:

- Tube Investments of India Limited
  - Associates and subsidiaries
    - CG Power and Industrial Solutions
    - Sedis
    - TI Clean Mobility (Montra Electric)
    - Shanthi Gears
    - TI Tsubamex Pvt Ltd
    - TI medical Pvt Ltd.

- Carborundum Universal
  - Associates and subsidiaries
    - Volzhsky Abrasive Works, Russia
    - Foskor Zirconia(Pty) Ltd., South Africa
    - Sterling Abrasives Ltd.
    - CUMI International Ltd.
  - Joint ventures
    - Wendt GmbH
    - Murugappa Morgan Thermal Ceramics

- Coromandel Engineering Company Limited (CEC)

- Finance:

- Cholamandalam Investment and Finance Company
  - Subsidiaries
    - Cholamandalam Securities Limited
    - Cholamandalam Home Finance Limited
- Cholamandalam MS General Insurance

- Others:

- Ambadi Enterprises Ltd.
  - Subsidiaries
    - Parry Murray & Co Ltd
- Cholamandalam MS Risk Services Limited
- Murugappa Water Technology & Solutions

=== Previous ===
- MEL Systems & Services Ltd (Murugappa Electronics)
- LaserWords India Pvt Ltd (ePublishing)

== Initiatives ==
- The Madras Song
