= Cholamandalam MS General Insurance =

Indian Assurance Company

Chola MS General Insurance Company Ltd
- Type: Public
- Industry: Financial services
- Founded: 2001
- Headquarters: Chennai, Tamil Nadu, India
- Key people: Suryanarayanan V, MD
- Products: General insurance; car insurance; Two wheeler insurance; Commercial vehicle insurance; Health insurance; Property insurance; Travel insurance; Accident insurance; Marine insurance; Crop insurance
- Parent: Murugappa Group; Mitsui Sumitomo Insurance Group
- Website: www.cholainsurance.com

Cholamandalam MS General Insurance Company Ltd (Chola MS) is an Indian insurance firm and a joint venture between the Murugappa Group, an Indian conglomerate, and the Mitsui Sumitomo Insurance Group, a Japanese insurance company.

The firm provides motor, health, accident, engineering, liability, marine, property, travel and rural insurance for individuals and corporate insurance. The company has 93 branches and over 6,000 agents across the country.
