= Coromandel International =

Indian agricultural products company

Coromandel International Limited
- Formerly: Coromandel Fertilisers
- Type: Public
- Traded as: BSE: 506395; NSE: COROMANDEL
- ISIN: INE169A01031
- Headquarters: Hyderabad, Telangana, India (registered office) Chennai, Tamil Nadu, India (corporate headquarters)
- Revenue: ▲₹29,628 crore (US$3.1 billion) (FY23)
- Operating income: ▲₹2,959 crore (US$310 million) (FY23)
- Net income: ▲₹2,013 crore (US$210 million) (FY23)
- Owner: EID Parry (62.82%)
- Parent: Murugappa Group
- Website: coromandel.biz

Coromandel International Limited is an Indian agrochemicals company which makes crop protection products. Originally named Coromandel Fertilisers, the company makes fertilizers, pesticides and specialty nutrients. Coromandel International is part of Murugappa Group and a subsidiary of EID Parry, which holds a 62.82% stake in the company.

The company was founded in the early 1960s by IMC and Chevron Companies and EID Parry. It operates a retail business in the states of Andhra Pradesh, Karnataka and Maharashtra through its Mana Gromor Centres. It has sixteen manufacturing units located in Andhra Pradesh, Tamil Nadu, Maharashtra, Gujarat, Rajasthan, Madhya Pradesh, Uttar Pradesh and Jammu and Kashmir. Its product line includes Gromor, Godavari, Paramfos, Parry Gold and Parry Super.

Coromandel was ranked #16 on Business Today's 2009 list of the Best Companies to work for in India. The company confers an annual Borlaug Award for outstanding Indian science in the field of agriculture and environment.

== Businesses ==
The Company's Crop Protection products are marketed in India and internationally, offering a range of technical and formulation products.

The Company has a research, development, and regulatory effort, supporting the businesses in process development and new product development.

=== Phosphatic fertilizer ===
The Company is India's second largest manufacturer and marketer of phosphate fertiliser.

=== Specialty nutrients ===
The Specialty Nutrients business focuses on products such as sulphur pastilles, water-soluble fertiliser and secondary and micronutrient segments. The Company is India's leading marketer of organic fertiliser and also offers biopesticides. Speciality nutrients cater to the needs of particular crops at different growth stages.

=== Retail ===
As of 2025 the company operated a network of around 1100 retail outlets across Andhra Pradesh, Telangana, Karnataka, TamilNadu and Maharashtra. Through these outlets, the company offers farming services including crop advisory, soil testing and farm mechanization to some 3 million farmers.

One store covers 30-40 villages and caters to some 5,000 farmer families.Overall the Retail outlets has connects more than 3 million farmers.
