= Sankili, Vizianagaram district =

Sankili
- village
- Interactive map of Sankili
- Location in Andhra Pradesh, India
- Coordinates: 18°33′44″N 83°44′35″E
- Country: India
- State: Andhra Pradesh

Languages
  - Official: Telugu
- Time zone: UTC+5:30 (IST)
- Postal code: 532440
- Vehicle registration: AP

Sanikili is a village located in Regidi Amadalavalasa mandal in Vizianagaram district, Andhra Pradesh, India.
