= Cholamandalam Investment and Finance Company =

Indian non-banking financial company

- Type: Public
- Traded as: NSE: CHOLAFIN; BSE: 511243
- Industry: Financial services
- Founded: 1978; 48 years ago
- Headquarters: Chennai, Tamil Nadu, India
- Key people: Ravindra Kumar Kundu (Executive Director); Vellayan Subbiah (Chairman & Non-Executive Director)
- Products: Vehicle Finance, Home Loans, Mortgage Loans, Wealth Management
- Revenue: ▲₹19,216 crore (US$2.0 billion) (FY24)
- Operating income: ▲₹4,582 crore (US$480 million) (FY24)
- Net income: ▲₹3,423 crore (US$360 million) (FY24)
- AUM: ▲₹254,000 crore (US$26 billion)
- Number of employees: 73,689 (2026)
- Parent: Murugappa Group
- Subsidiaries: Cholamandalam Home Finance Limited (CHFL); Cholamandalam Securities Limited (CSEC)
- Website: www.cholamandalam.com

Cholamandalam Investment and Finance Company Limited (CIFCL) is a Chennai based Indian non-banking financial company and investment service provider founded in 1978 under the Murugappa Group.

== History ==
Cholamandalam Investment and Finance Company Limited (known as "Chola") is an Indian non-banking financial company incorporated in 1978.

In 2005, DBS Bank acquired a 37.5% stake in Cholamandalam Investment and Finance Company, with the Murugappa Group lowering its stake to 37.5%. The company was subsequently renamed as Cholamandalam DBS Finance. In 2010, DBS Bank sold its entire stake back to Murugappa Group and exited the joint venture.

In January 2020, Cholamandalam raised ₹400 crore through the issuance of 10-year subordinated Rupee-denominated Masala binds to the Uk's CDC Group.

== Operations ==
As of 2026, the company has 1,820 branches across 26 states and 7 Union Territories in India, SERVING 4.47 million customers. Backed by a workforce exceeding 71,000 employees and over 2.54 lakh crore in asset under management (AUM).
