= A. M. M. Murugappa Chettiar =

Indian industrialist (1902–1965)

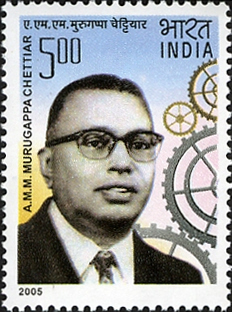
- Chettiar on a 2005 stamp of India
- Born: 23 January 1902
- Died: 31 October 1965 (aged 63)
- Occupation: industrialist

A. M. M. Murugappa Chettiar (23 January 1902 – 31 October 1965) was an Indian industrialist who served as the first Indian President of the Madras Chamber of Commerce and Industry. He is the eldest son of A. M. Murugappa Chettiar, the founder of Murugappa Group.
