= Tube (fluid conveyance) =

Long hollow cylinder used for moving fluids

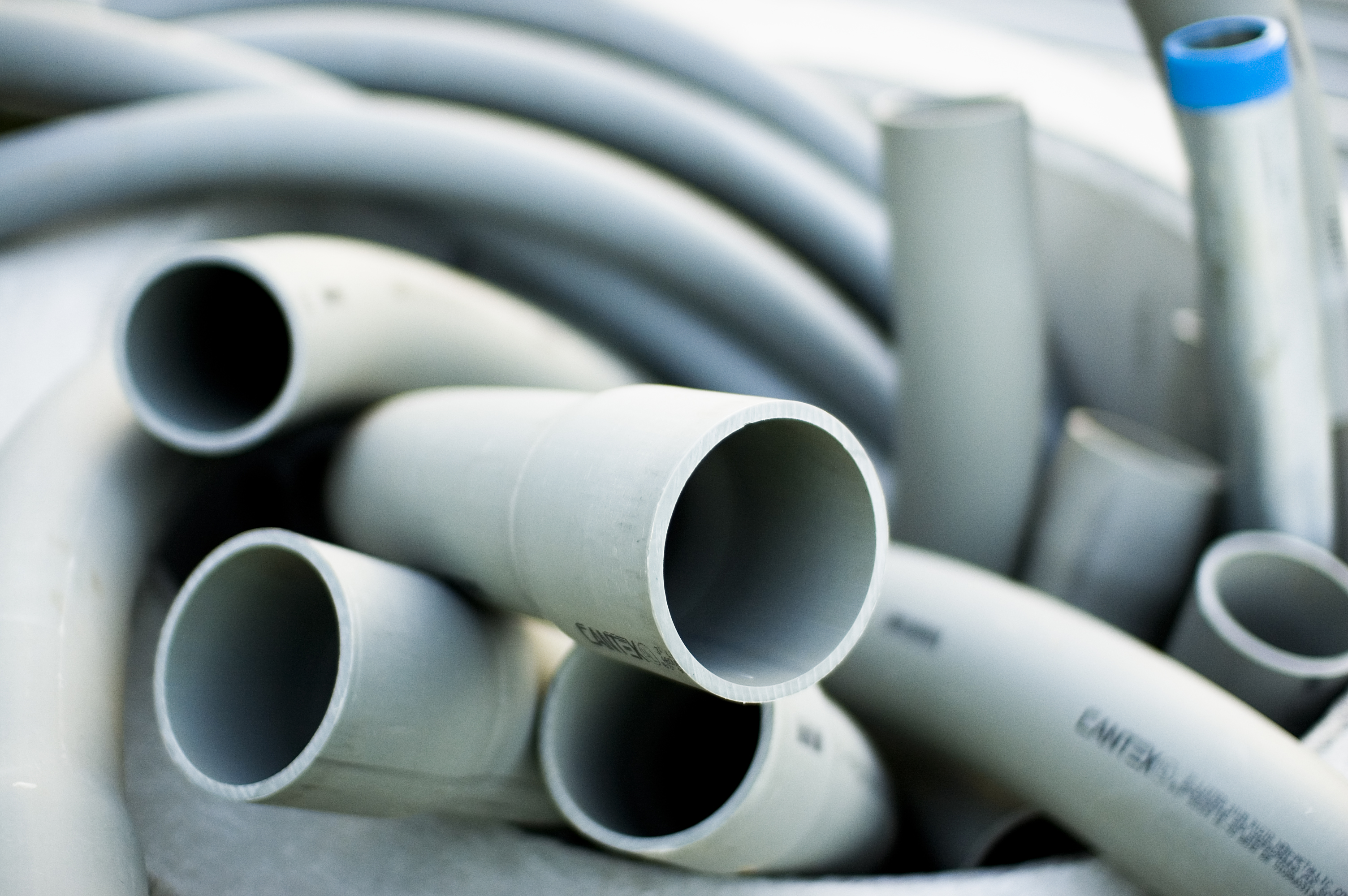
Plastic tubing

A tube, or tubing, is a long hollow cylinder used for moving fluids (liquids or gases) or to protect electrical or optical cables and wires.

The terms "pipe" and "tube" are almost interchangeable, although minor distinctions exist — generally, a tube has tighter engineering requirements than a pipe. Both pipe and tube imply a level of rigidity and permanence, whereas a hose is usually portable and flexible. A tube and pipe may be specified by standard pipe size designations, e.g., nominal pipe size, or by nominal outside or inside diameter and/or wall thickness. The actual dimensions of a pipe are usually not the nominal dimensions: A 1-inch pipe will not actually measure 1 inch in either outside or inside diameter, whereas many types of tubing are specified by actual inside diameter, outside diameter, or wall thickness.

== Manufacture ==
There are three classes of manufactured tubing: seamless, as-welded or electric resistant welded (ERW), and drawn-over-mandrel (DOM).

- Seamless tubing is produced via extrusion or rotary piercing.
- Drawn-over-mandrel tubing is made from cold-drawn electrical-resistance-welded tube that is drawn through a die and over a mandrel to create such characteristics as dependable weld integrity, dimensional accuracy, and an excellent surface finish.

== Standards ==
There are many industry and government standards for pipe and tubing. Many standards exist for tube manufacture; some of the most common are as follows:

- ASTM A213 Standard Specification for Seamless Ferritic and Austenitic Alloy-Steel Boiler, Superheater, Heat-Exchanger Tubes.
- ASTM A269 Standard Specification for Seamless and Welded Austenitic Stainless Steel Tubing for General Service
- ASTM A270 Standard Specification for Seamless and Welded Austenitic Stainless Steel Sanitary Tubing
- ASTM A511 Standard Specification for Seamless Stainless Steel Mechanical Tubing
- ASTM A513 Standard Specification for Electric-Resistance-Welded Carbon and Alloy Steel Mechanical Tubing
- ASTM A554 Standard Specification for Welded Stainless Steel Mechanical Tubing
- British Standard 1387:1985 Specification for screwed and socketed steel tubes and tubulars and for plain end steel tubes suitable for welding or for screwing to BS 21 pipe threads

ASTM material specifications generally cover a variety of grades or types that indicate a specific material composition. Some of the most commonly used are:

- TP 304
- TP 316
- MT 304
- MT 403
- MT 506

In installations using hydrogen, copper and stainless steel tubing must be factory pre-cleaned (ASTM B 280) and/or certified as instrument grade. This is due to hydrogen's particular propensities: to explode in the presence of oxygen, oxygenation sources, or contaminants; to leak due to its atomic size; and to cause embrittlement of metals, particularly under pressure.

== Calculation of strength ==
For a tube of silicone rubber with a tensile strength of 10 MPa and an 8 mm outside diameter and 2 mm thick walls. The maximum pressure may be calculated as follows:

Outside diameter = 8 millimeters (0.3150 in)
Wall thickness = 2 millimeters (0.07874 in)
Tensile strength = 10 * 1000000 [Pa]

Bursting pressure = (Tensile strength * Wall thickness * 2 / (10 * Outside diameter) ) * 10 [Pa]

Gives bursting pressure of 5 MPa.

Using a safety factor:

Pressure max = (Tensile strength * Wall thickness * 2 / (10 * Outer diameter) ) * 10 / Safety_factor [Pa]

33

== See also ==
- Copper tubing
- Hydrogen piping
- Hydraulic tubes
- Materials used in water supply systems
- Pipe
- Piping
- Tube and pipe benders
