= Maniyar Dam =

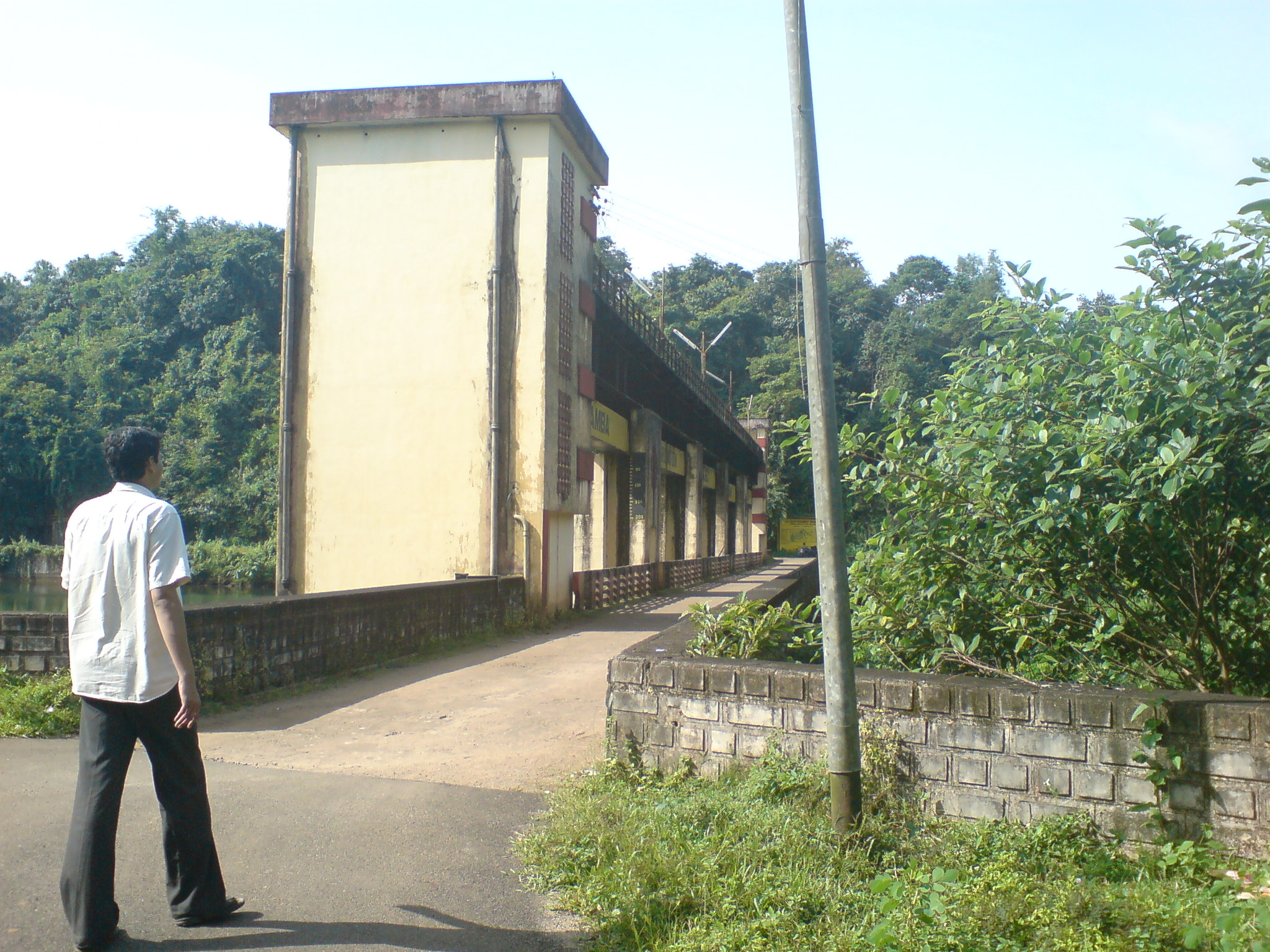
- Viewed from the north.

- Location within India Location within Kerala Location within Tamil Nadu
- Location: Maniyar, Pathanamthitta district, Kerala, India
- Coordinates: 9.3296°N 76.8797°E

Maniyar Dam is a masonry gravity dam located on the Kakkattar River in the Indian state of Kerala. It is located in Maniyar, Pathanamthitta.
