= EID Parry =

Indian public company located in Inida

EID Parry (India) Limited

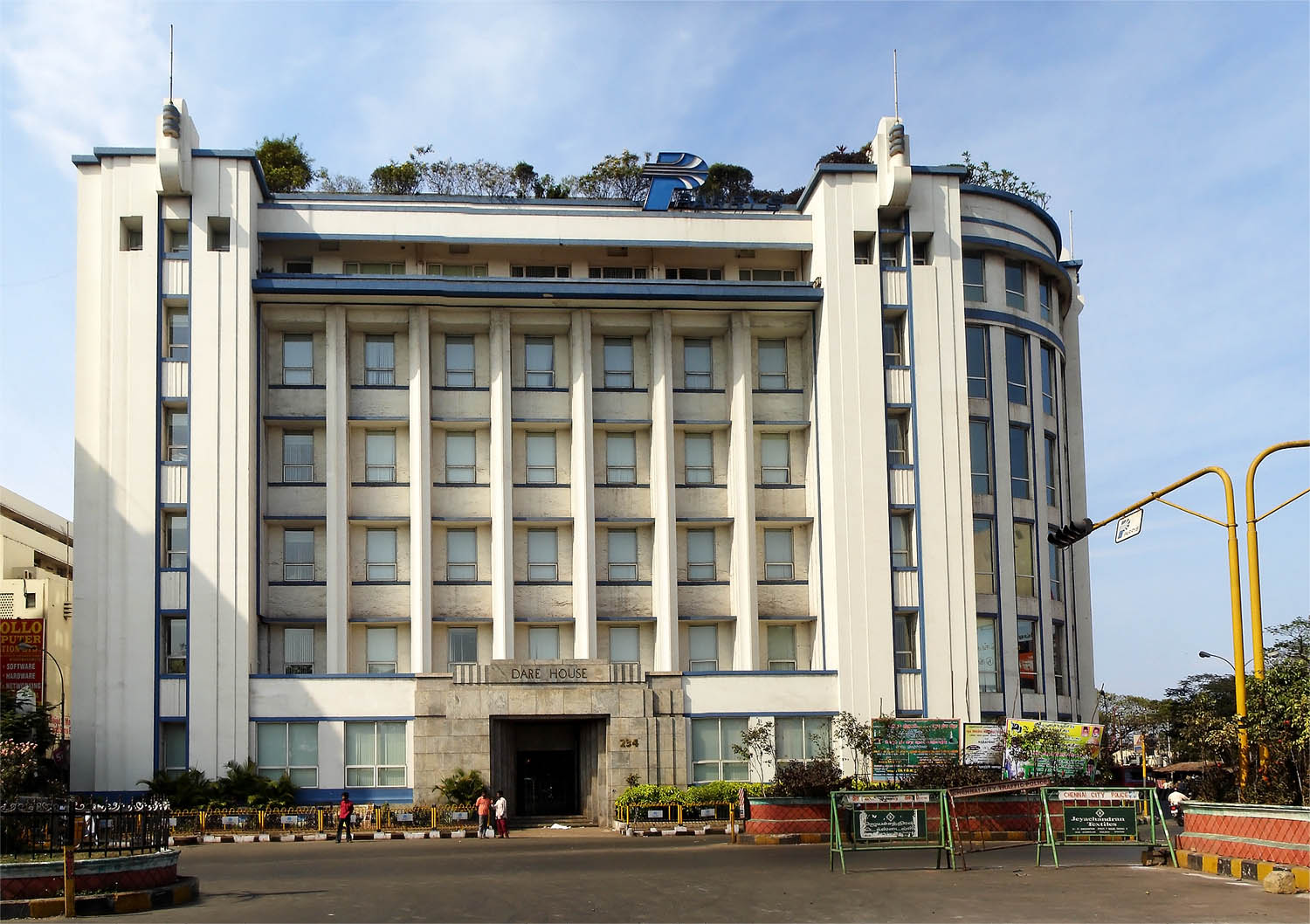
- EID Parry head office at Parry's Corner, Chennai
- Formerly: East India Distilleries
- Type: Public
- Traded as: BSE: 500125; NSE: EIDPARRY
- ISIN: INE126A01031
- Founded: 1788
- Headquarters: Chennai, Tamil Nadu, India
- Key people: M. M. Murugappan (Chairman)
- Products: Sugar, Cogeneration, Distillery, Value Added Products, Nutraceuticals & Biofertilizers
- Revenue: ▲₹35,283 crore (US$3.7 billion) (FY23)
- Operating income: ▲₹2,520 crore (US$260 million) (FY23)
- Net income: ▲₹1,827 crore (US$190 million) (FY23)
- Total assets: ▼₹15,024 crore (US$1.6 billion) (2020)
- Total equity: ▲₹3,519 crore (US$370 million) (2020)
- Number of employees: 2,000+
- Parent: Murugappa Group
- Subsidiaries: Coromandel International; Sadhasiva Sugars India Limited; US Nutraceuticals LLC
- Website: www.eidparry.com

EID Parry Limited is an Indian public company engaged in the manufacture and marketing of sugar and bio-products, headquartered in Chennai. EID Parry has been in business since 1788, making it the oldest surviving mercantile name in Chennai. It has many firsts to its credit, including the manufacturing of fertilizers (1906) for the first time in the Indian subcontinent.

== Origin and history ==
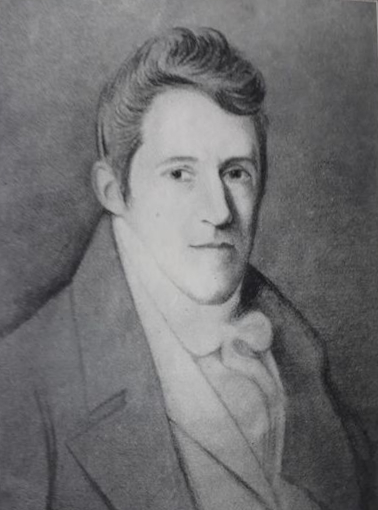
Thomas Parry

EID Parry is one of the oldest business entities in India and was originated by Thomas Parry, a Welshman who came to India in the late 1780s. On 17 July 1788, he started a business of banking and piece goods.

By 1819, a partnership firm named "Parry and Dare" Company was founded by Thomas Parry and John William Dare. Parry's Corner, one of the most prominent central business districts of Chennai, derives its name from Parry. Over a period of time, the business established by Parry continued to grow, and its flagship company EID Parry emerged.

In 1908 Parry & Company set-up ‘The Pottery’ unit in Ranipettai. Over the years it was named as "Parryware".

Parry & Company Limited and East India Distilleries & Sugars Limited were merged to form EID Parry India Limited. In its more than 200-year existence, this house remained active and operated many businesses.

The Murugappa Group took over EID Parry in 1981 from financial & public institutions such as Life Insurance Corporation Of India, United Assurance Co, and Unit Trust of India.

== Businesses ==
=== Sugar ===
EID Parry set up India's first sugar plant at Nellikuppam in 1842. It was India's first private sector company to perform research and development (R&D). The sugar division contributes to over 65% of EID Parry's turnover, and around 20% of the sugar production in Tamil Nadu is from EID. The Nellikuppam Integrated Sugar Complex has a crushing capacity of 6500 metric tonnes per day, its co-generation facilities produce 24.5 MW of power, and its distillery facilities produce 75 kilolitres per day. The Travancore Sugars & Chemicals Ltd. (TSCL) at Valanjavattom Thiruvalla the Sugar division, Distillery division and Blending & Bottling division was originally owned by M/s Parry & Co. Government of Kerala (GOK) took over the company in 1974.

EID Parry has 7 plants in the country situated at Nellikuppam in Cuddalore district, Pugalur in Karur district, Kurumbur in Pudukottai district, Pettavaithalai in Trichy district, Pondicherry in Puducherry, Haliyal in Karnataka and Sankili in Andhra Pradesh. The combined crushing capacity of all seven plants is 32,500 (TCD) Metric Tonnes of cane per day.

The Pudukottai unit of EID Parry was built at a site that had been rejected as a factory site at the request of the Indian government. It became one of the firm's largest revenue generators.

The Pugalur unit was acquired by EID Parry in 1992. The co-generation facilities at Pugalur can produce 22.5 MW of power, and it has a cane crushing capacity of 4000 metric tonnes per day.

The Pettavaithalai factory was bought in 1998 and can co-generate 19.6 MW of power. Its cane crushing capacity is 3000 metric tonnes per day.

Recently, EID Parry acquired the sugar plants of GMR Group in states like Karnataka and Andhra. The plants at Haliyal and Sankili were merged with EID Parry on 1 April 2012, and the plant at Ramdurg in Karnataka is operated on a lease basis.

==== Sugar Plants of EID Parry Group ====
- Nellikuppam in Cuddalore District,
- Pugalur in Karur District,
- Kurumbur, Aranthangi Taluk in Pudukottai District,
- Pettavaithalai in Trichy district,
- Pondicherry, in Puducherry
- Bagalkot, in Karnataka.
- Haliyal, in Karnataka
- Sankili, in Andhra Pradesh.

=== Bio-products ===
The bio-products business makes eco-friendly products from natural resources. Currently, the core of this business is the Neemazal range of products made from neem seed kernel at the company's production facility at Thyagavalli near Cuddalore, Tamil Nadu. The Bangalore (R&D) group supports the business by developing new formulations and delivery mechanisms for the application of the Neemazal range of products.

New products from this company include AbdA, SpreadMax, Yieldsmor, and Beemax. The company is now expanding its range of products away from azadirachtin, its core product extracted from neem seed kernel.

== Subsidiaries ==
=== Parrys Sugar Industries Limited ===
Acquired from GMR group, EID Parry holds a 65% stake. It merged with EID Parry on 1 April 2012.

=== Coromandel International Limited ===
EID Parry holds 56.4% of the company Coromandel International.

=== Other ===
- Parry Chemicals Limited
- US Nutraceuticals LLC
- Parry Phytoremedies Private Limited
- Parrys Investments Limited
- Parry Infrastructure Co Pvt Ltd
- Parrys Sugar Limited
- Coromandel Brasil Limitada
- CFL Mauritius Limited
- Sabero Organics Gujarat Limited
- Parry Agrochem Exports Limited
- Alagawadi Bireshwar Sugars Private Limited
- Parry Sugars Refinery India Private Limited (Formerly known as Silkroad Sugar Private Limited)

=== Former Subsidiaries ===
==== Coromandel Bathware ====
Operations have been suspended at this 100% EID Parry subsidiary since 31 March 2000.

==== Parryware ====
Parryware is now a 100% subsidiary of Roca Sanitario S.A. and is known as Roca Bathroom Products Private Limited. It was created as a subsidiary of EID Parry called Parryware Private Limited, then became a joint venture between EID Parry and Roca called Parryware Roca India Private Limited after Roca purchased 45% of its shares. EID Parry later divested its remaining holdings in Parryware Roca India Private Limited to Roca.

==== Parry Confectionery ====
Parry Confectionery was sold to Lotte Confectionery Co. Ltd, Korea (a confectionery major, part of the $65 Billion Lotte Group) in 2004. It is now known as Lotte India Corporation Limited, and manufactures Lotte Chocopie, a popular snack across India, along with Coffy Bite, Caramilk, Eclairs and Lacto King.

==== MEL Systems and Services Electronics Limited ====
- 1983: Murugappa Group established Murugappa Electronics Limited (present day MEL Systems and Services)
- 1993: EID Parry merged Murugappa Electronics Limited with itself as Murugappa Industrial & Technical Services [Division]
- 1995:
  - January: EID Parry de-merged Murugappa Industrial & Technical Services as MEL Systems and Services Electronics Limited
  - December: Murugappa Group exited from electronics business after EID Parry divested MEL Systems and Services Electronics Limited
