= List of dams and reservoirs in Kerala =

There are a total of 81 dams in the Indian state of Kerala. Of which, the Kerala State Electricity Board owns 59 dams which form 45 reservoirs, the Kerala Irrigation Department owns 20 dams which form 20 reservoirs and the Kerala Water Authority vests the control of 2 dams with 2 reservoirs.

Three dams Munnar Headworks Dam, Pambla Dam and Maniyar Dam have no drainage area across the river. The Idukki Dam and Idamalayar Dam together hold 48 percent of the total storage capacity of all dams in the state. There are multiple dams in 3 reservoirs - Gavi Dam, Kakki dam and Idukki Dam. In addition, there are 10 large barrages also in the state. Out of the 81 dams 37 reservoirs are used for hydroelectric power, 27 reservoirs are used for irrigation and 9 reservoirs are used for both hydroelectric power and irrigation.

== List of Dams ==
District Wise
District/City	Number of Dams
Thiruvananthapuram	3
Kollam	1
Pathanamthitta	11
Idukki	20
Ernakulam	2
Thrissur	6
Palakkad	15
Wayanad	2
Kozhikode	2
Kannur	1
Total	63

Number	Name	River	Area (km^{2})	District	Owner	Completed	Type	Full Reservoir Level (FRL) in Meters	Number of Shutters	Co-ordinate	Altitude (m)
1.	Malampuzha Dam	Bharathapuzha River	23.13	Palakkad	Kerala Irrigation Department	1955		115.06	4	10.84°N 76.69°E	104
2.	Mangalam Dam	Bharathapuzha River	3.93	Palakkad	Kerala Irrigation Department	1966		77.88	5	10.51°N 76.54°E	72
3.	Meenkara Dam	Bharathapuzha River	2.59	Palakkad	Kerala Irrigation Department	1960		156.36		10.62°N 76.80°E	152
4.	Chulliar Dam	Bharathapuzha River	1.59	Palakkad	Kerala Irrigation Department			154.08		10.59°N 76.77°E	143
5.	Pothundi Dam	Bharathapuzha River	3.63	Palakkad	Kerala Irrigation Department			108.204		10.54°N 76.63°E	93
6.	Walayar Dam	Bharathapuzha River	2.59	Palakkad	Kerala Irrigation Department			203.00		10.84°N 76.86°E	197
7.	Siruvani Dam	Siruvani River		Palakkad	Kerala Irrigation Department	1984		878.5		10.977°N 76.642°E	
8.	Kanjirapuzha Dam	Bharathapuzha River	5.12	Palakkad	Kerala Irrigation Department			97.535	3	10.98°N 76.55°E	90
9.	Kanjhirapuzha baby Dam	Bharathapuzha River	2.12	Palakkad	Kerala Irrigation Department			36.523	2	10°59′32″N 76°33′49″E	
10.	Parambikulam Dam	Chalakkudy River	20.92	Palakkad						10.39°N 76.8°E	545
11	Thunakkadavu Dam	Chalakkudy River	2.83	Palakkad						10.433°N 76.784°E	565
12.	Peruvaaripallam Dam	Chalakkudy River		Palakkad						10.447°N 76.77°E	565
13.	Sholayar Dam	Chalakkudy River	8.70	Thrissur	Kerala State Electricity Board	1966		811.68m		10°17′N 76°45′E	
14.	Peringalkuthu Dam	Chalakkudy River	2.82	Thrissur	Kerala State Electricity Board	1957		424m		10°18′59″N 76°37′59″E	
15.	Thenmala Dam	Kallada River	25.90	Kollam	Kerala Irrigation Department	1986				09°57′0″N 77°4′20″E	
16.	Aruvikkara Dam	Karamana River	2.58	Thiruvananthapuram	Kerala Water Authority					08°28′N 77°58′E	
17.	Peechi Dam	Karuvanoor River	12.63	Thrissur	Kerala Irrigation Department					10.53°N 76.39°E	73
18.	Vazhani Dam	Keecheri River	2.55	Thrissur	Kerala Irrigation Department					10°40′N 76°15′E	
19.	Kuttiady Dam	Kuttiady River	10.52	Kozhikode	Kerala Irrigation Department	1993		44.41		11°36′0″N 75°49′27″E	
19.	Neyyar Dam	Neyyar River	15.00	Thiruvananthapuram	Kerala Irrigation Department			84.75		08°32′N 77°08′E	
20.	Pamba Dam	Pamba River	90.88	Pathanamthitta	Kerala State Electricity Board			986.3328		09°20′N 76°53′E	
21.	Kakki	Pamba River	17.6	Pathanamthitta	Kerala State Electricity Board			981.456		9°17′N 77°15′E	981m
22.	Idukki Dam	Periyar River	61.60	Idukki						09°48′N 76°53′E	720
23.	Ponmudi Dam	Periyar River	2.60	Idukki						09°55′N 77°05′E	
24.	Anayirankal Dam	Periyar River	4.33	Idukki	Kerala State Electricity Board	1967				10°0′N 77°0′E	
25.	Kundala Dam	Periyar River	2.30	Idukki						10°0′N 77°0′E	
26.	Mattupatti Dam	Periyar River	3.24	Idukki						10°05′N 77°05′E	
27.	Sengulam Dam	Periyar River	0.33	Idukki						10°00′N 77°05′E	
28.	Neriamangalam Dam	Periyar River	4.13	Ernakulam							
29.	Bhoothathankettu Dam	Periyar River	6.08	Ernakulam							
30.	Periyar Lake	Periyar River	28.90	Idukki						10°10′N 76°15′E	
31.	Pazhassi Dam (Kuyilur Barrage)	Valapattanam River	6.48	Kannur	Kerala Irrigation Department			26.52			
32.	Peppara Dam	Karamana River	5.82	Thiruvananthapuram	Kerala Water Authority						
33.	Malankara Dam	Muvattupuzha River	11.00	Idukki	Kerala Irrigation Department	1994		42.00			
34.	Chimmony Dam	Kurumali River	8.5067	Thrissur	Kerala Irrigation Department			40.00		10°26′21″N 76°27′37″E	
35.	Banasura Sagar Dam	Kabini River		Wayanad							
36.	Karapuzha Dam	Karapuzha River		Wayanad	Kerala Irrigation Department						
37.	Mullaperiyar Dam	Periyar River		Idukki							
38.	Cheruthoni Dam	Periyar River		Idukki							
39.	Kulamavu Dam	Periyar River		Idukki							
40.	Erattayar Dam	Erattayar Lake		Idukki							
41.	Kakkayam Dam	Kuttiyadi River	7.15	Kozhikode	Kerala Irrigation Department						
42.	Asurankund Dam	Chelakkara River		Thrissur						10°41′08″N 76°17′44″E	
43.	Maniyar Dam	Kakkattar		Pathanamthitta	Kerala Irrigation Department					9°19′45″N 76°52′51″E	
44.	Moozhiyar Dam	Pamba		Pathanamthitta	Kerala State Electricity Board						
45.	Perunthenaruvi Weir	Pamba		Pathanamthitta	Kerala State Electricity Board						
46.	Karikkayam Dam	Kakkattar		Pathanamthitta	Energy Development Company Limited				7	9°20′07″N 76°53′57″E	
47.	Allunkal Dam	Kakkattar		Pathanamthitta	Energy Development Company Limited				5	9°20′15″N 76°56′50″E	
48.	Kochu Pamba Weir	Pamba		Pathanamthitta	Kerala State Electricity Board						
49.	Anathode Dam	Pamba		Pathanamthitta	Kerala State Electricity Board						
50.	Veluthodu Dam	Pamba		Pathanamthitta	Kerala State Electricity Board						
51.	Idamalayar Dam	Periyar River	28.3	Ernakulam	Kerala State Electricity Board	1985		169		10°13′16.0″N 76°42′18.4″E	
52.	Kallarkutty Dam	Muthirappuzha River	281.24	Idukki	Kerala State Electricity Board	1961		456.6			
53.	Pambla Dam	Periyar River		Idukki				253			
54.	Munnar Headworks Dam	Muthirapuzha River		Idukki		1940					
55.	Moolathara Dam	River		Palakkad	Kerala Irrigation Department	1963		184.405			
56.	Thunakkadavu Dam	Thunakadavu River		Palakkad	Kerala Irrigation Department	1965					
57.	Peruvaripallam Dam	Peruvaripallam River		Palakkad	Kerala Irrigation Department	1971					

== List of Regulators ==
The main regulators in the state are

- Chamravattom Regulator-cum-Bridge in Malappuram district across Bharathappuzha completed in 2012.
- Tirur Chamathachal regulator in Kannur district across Valapattanam River.
- Madambam regulator in Kannur district across Valapattanam River.
- Idiyanchira regulator near Chettuva Backwater in Thrissur district to protect Kole Wetlands.
- Enamakkal regulator in Puzhakkal River in Thrissur district to protect Kole Wetlands.
- Ilikkal regulator in Karuvannur River in Thrissur district to protect Kole Wetlands.
- Koothumakkal regulator in Thrissur district to protect Kole Wetlands.
- Pandikandam regulator in Chandragiri River at Kasaragod district.

== See also ==
- Tamil Nadu-Kerala dam row
- Thottappally Spillway
