= Gavi Dam =

Dam in Kerala

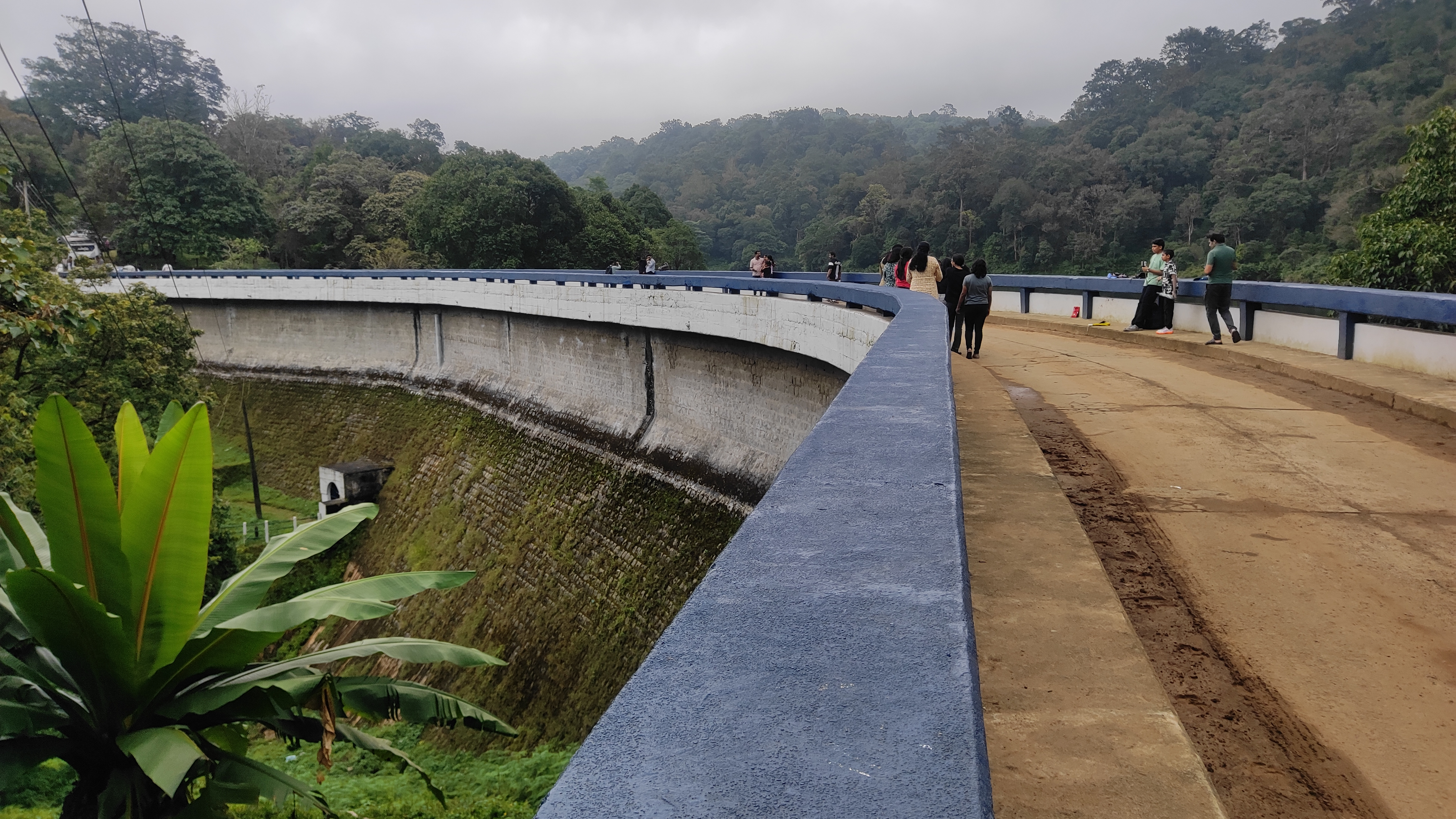

- Location within Kerala Location within India
- Interactive map of Gavi Dam
- Country: India
- Location: Gavi
- Coordinates: 9°26′28″N 77°09′36″E
- Purpose: Power
- Status: Operational
- Opening date: 1990
- Owner: Kerala State Electricity Board

Dam and spillways
- Type of dam: Gravity dam
- Impounds: Gaviar
- Height (foundation): 17.00 m (55.77 ft)
- Length: 110 m (360 ft)
- Website

Gavi Dam or Gaviar Dam (Malayalam: ഗവിയാർ അണക്കെട്ട്) is a small, gravity dam constructed as a part of Sabarigiri hydro electric project on Gaviyar, which is a tributary of Pamba river at Seethathode village in Pathanamthitta district of Kerala, India. Taluks through which release flow are Ranni, Konni, Kozhencherry, Thiruvalla, Chengannur, Kuttanadu, Mavelikara and Karthikappally.

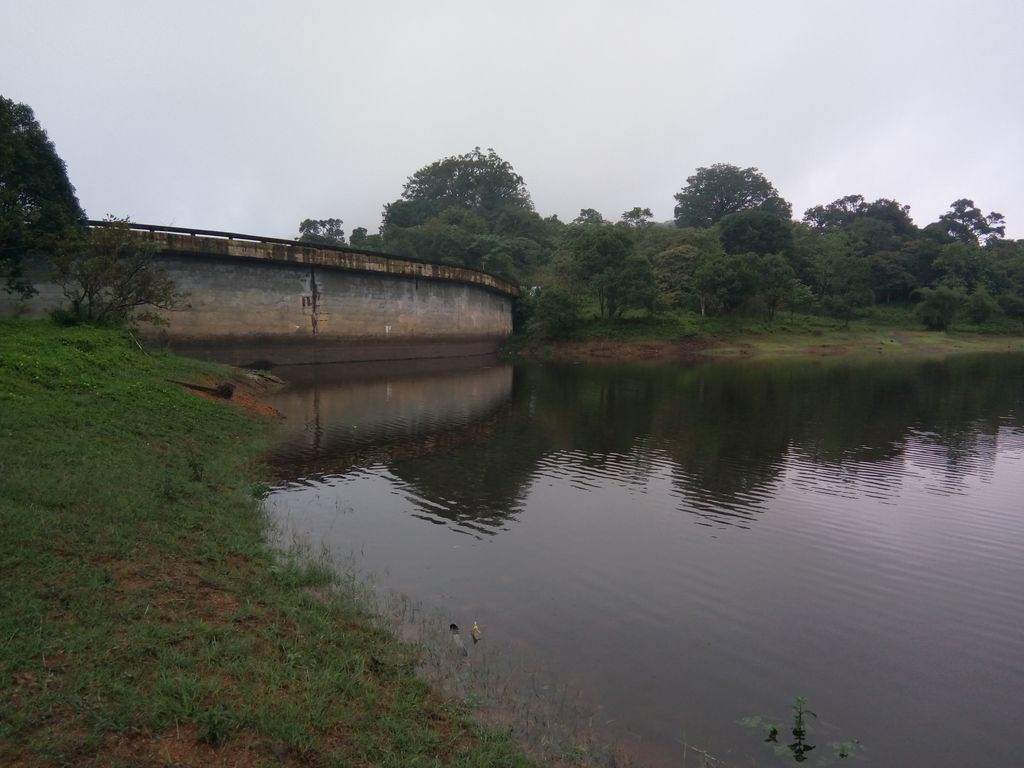
Gavi Dam and reservoir

Sabarigiri Hydro Electric Project (340 MW) is the second largest hydro electric project of Kerala and is located in Pathanamthitta District. This dam was constructed as a part of Sabarigiri Augmentation scheme. The reservoir is common to Gavi & Kullar dams. Water from this reservoir is diverted to Meenar–I reservoir through a tunnel. This masonry - gravity dam has a height of 17.07 meters and is 113 meters long, and is classified under Medium height type dams. The dam construction was completed in 1990. The dams of Moozhiyar, Kakki, Anathode, Gavi and Kochu Pamba are part of the Sabarigiri hydro-electric project.

== Specifications ==
- Latitude: 9° 24' 30" N
- Longitude: 77° 08' 00" E
- Panchayath: Seethathodu
- Village: Seethathodu
- District: Pathanamthitta
- River Basin: Pamba
- River: Gaviar
- Release from Dam to river: Pamba
- Year of completion: 1990
- Name of Project: Sabarigiri HEP
- Purpose of Project: Hydro Power
- Type of Dam: Masonry – Gravity
- Classification: MH (Medium Height)
- Maximum Water Level (MWL): EL 1139.2 m
- Full Reservoir Level (FRL): EL 1136.9 m
- Storage at FRL: 2.78 Mm^{3}
- Height from deepest foundation: 17.07 m
- Length: 113.00 m
- Spillway: No spillway
- Crest Level: NA
- River Outlet: Not provided

== Tourism around the Reservoir ==
Gavi Eco-Tourism, a project of the Kerala Forest Development Corporation is attracting lots of tourist. The project offers eco tourism activities like jeep safari, boat ride and Sabarimala view from its view point.
