= Kochu Pamba Weir =

Diversion dam in Kerala, India

Coordinates: 9°24′23″N 77°8′51″E

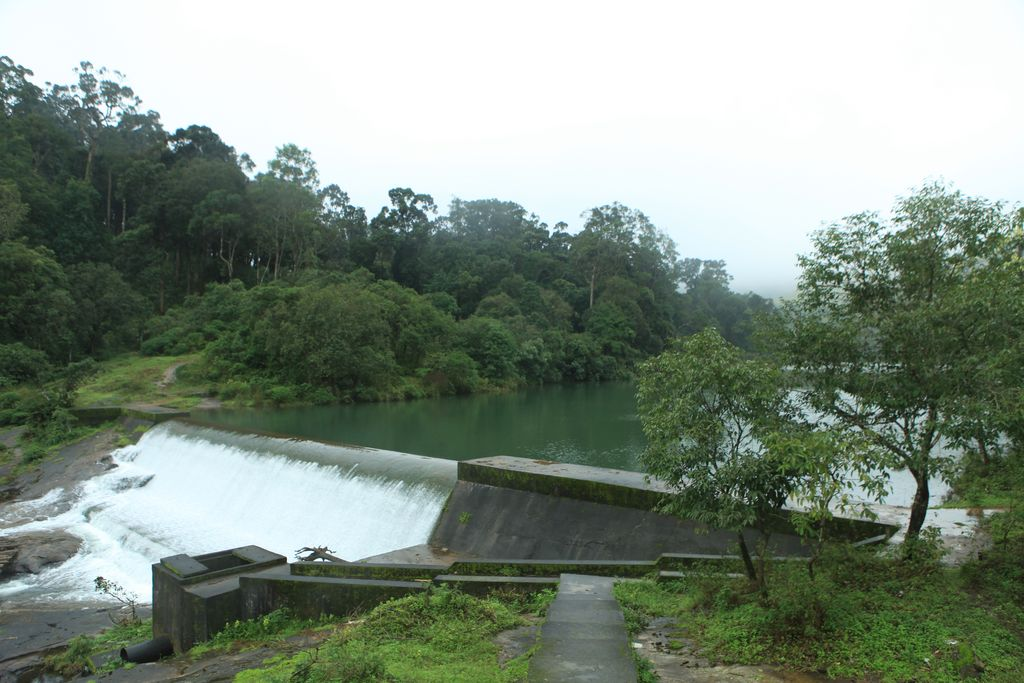
Kochu Pamba Weir

Kochu Pamba Weir is a diversion dam constructed across Pamba river in Seethathode village of Pathanamthitta district in Kerala, India. It is one of the five dams which are parts of Sabarigiri Hydro Electric Project. These are Pamba dam, Kakki dam, Anathode dam, Gavi dam and Kochu Pamba weir. Sabarigiri Hydro Electric Project (340 MW) is the second largest hydro-electric project of Kerala and is located in Pathanamthitta district. This weir is constructed as a part of Sabarigiri Augmentation Scheme. Water from this reservoir is pumped into the Pamba reservoir through a pump house located at the downstream of Pamba dam. Taluks through which release flow are Ranni, Konni, Kozhencherry, Thiruvalla, Chengannur, Kuttanadu, Mavelikara and Karthikappally.

== Specifications ==
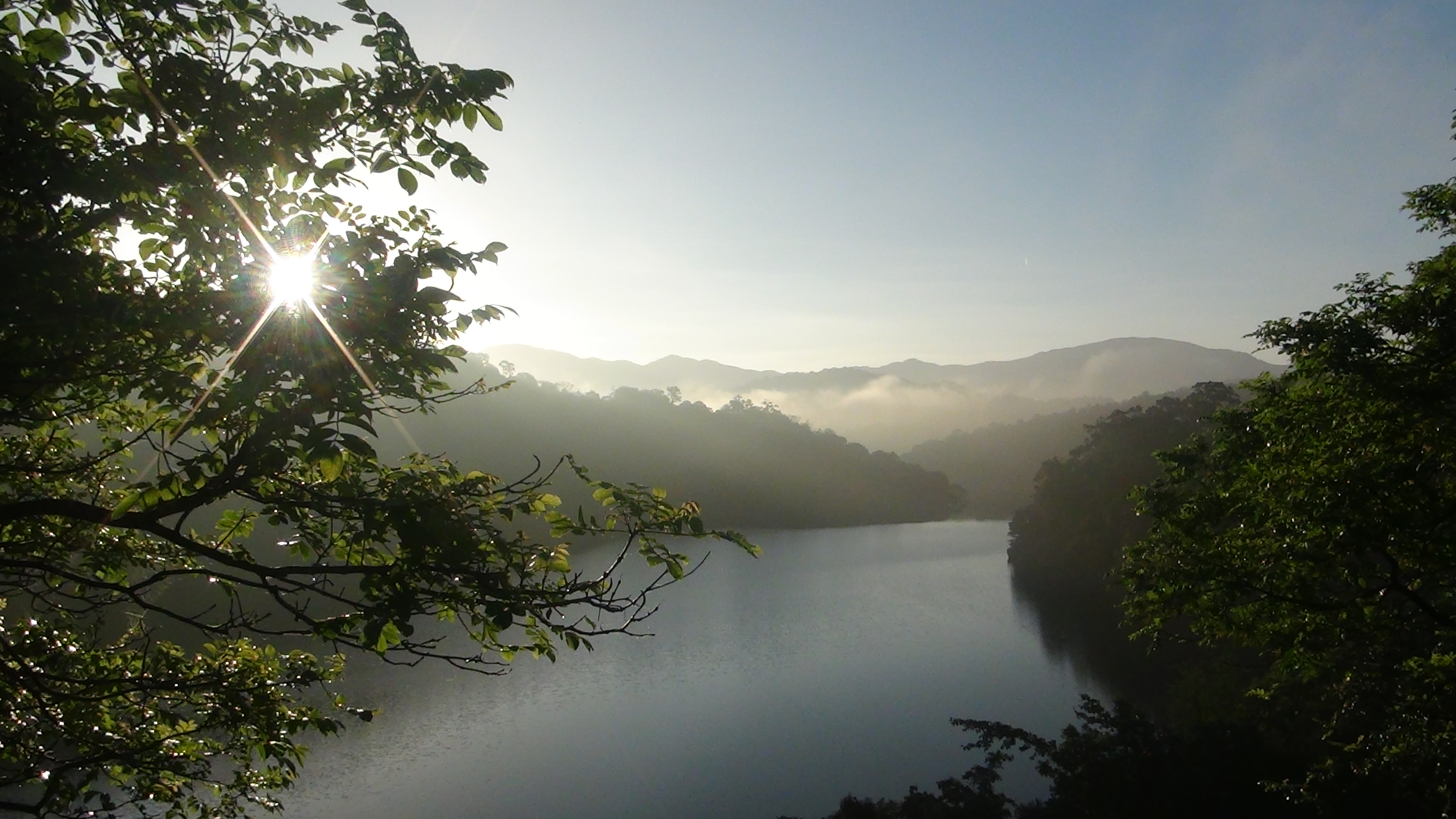
ESE view from the lakeside of from Kochu Pamba Weir reservoir.

- Latitude : 9⁰ 17′ 00 ” N
- Longitude: 77⁰ 08′ 30” E
- Panchayath : Seethathodu
- Village : Seethathodu
- District : Pathanamthitta
- River Basin : Pamba
- River : Pamba
- Year of completion
- Name of Project : Sabarigiri HEP
- Purpose of Project Hydro Power
- Type of Dam Concrete- gravity
- Classification Weir
- Maximum Water Level (MWL) EL 936.18 m
- Full Reservoir Level ( FRL) EL 935.73 m
- Storage at FRL Diversion only
- Height from deepest foundation : 3.65 m ( Height above river bed)
- Release from Dam to river Pamba Length 52.45 m
- Spillway : Ogee Type; Overflow section- Ungated
- Crest Level EL 935.73 m
- River Outlet 1 No. Circular type, 60cm dia
