= Upper Moozhiyar Dam =

Diversion dam in Kerala, India

Upper moozhiyar dam
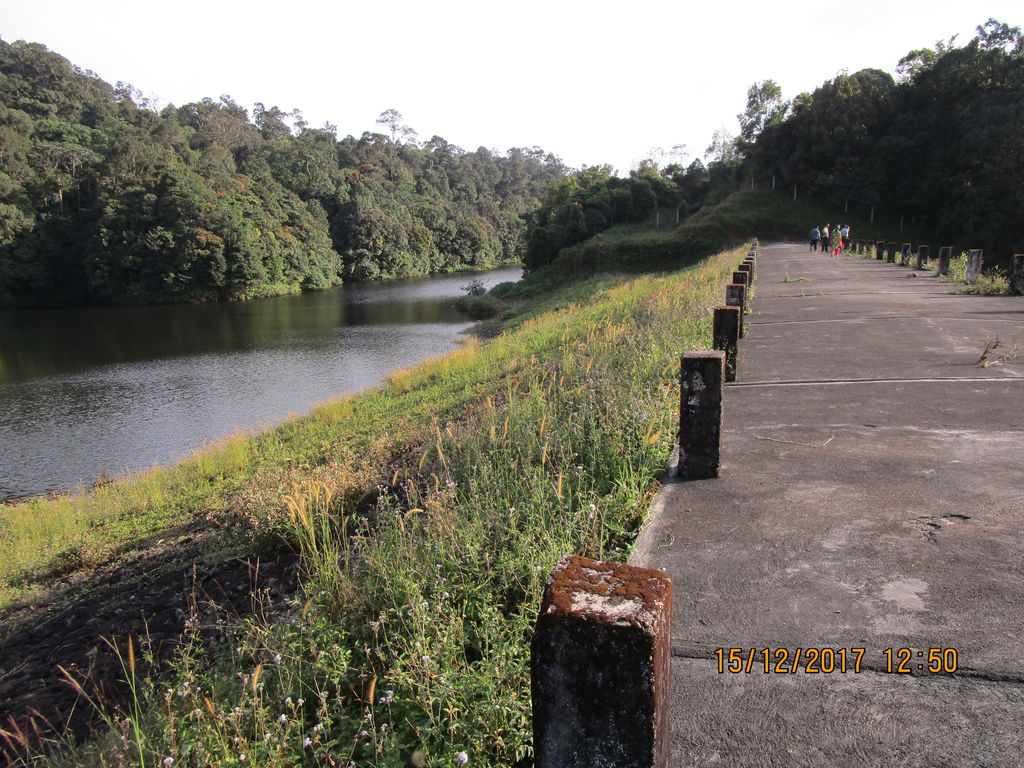
- Interactive map of Upper moozhiyar dam
- Country: India
- Opening date: 1979

The Upper Moozhiyar Dam is an earthen dam constructed across the Moozhiyar River in the village of Seethathodu in Pathanamthitta district, Kerala, India. This dam was constructed as a part of the Sabarigiri Augmentation Scheme. The stream is located on the southern side of the Kakki reservoir. It is an embankment structure. The Sabarigiri Hydro Electric Project (340 MW) is the second largest hydroelectric project of Kerala and is located in Pathanamthitta district. The dam was constructed to divert the upper reaches of the Moozhiyar River, a tributary of the Pamba River, to the Kakki–Anathode reservoir through a tunnel. The surplus over the storage flows over the rock-cut spillway to the Moozhiyar River. Taluks through which the release flows are Ranni, Konni, Kozhencherry, Thiruvalla, Chengannur, Kuttanadu, Mavelikara, and Karthikappally. The nearest city is Vandiperiyar.

== Specifications ==
- Latitude: 9°17′00″ N
- Longitude: 77°08′00″ E
- Panchayath: Seethathodu
- Village: Seethathodu
- District: Pathanamthitta
- River basin: Pamba
- River: Moozhiyar
- Release from dam to river: Moozhiyar

=== Dam features ===
- Type of dam: earthen
- Classification: medium height (MH)
- Maximum water level (MWL): EL 985.00 m
- Full level (FRL): EL 983.00 m
- Storage at FRL: 0.035 Mm^{3}
- Height from deepest foundation: 19.00 metres (62.34 ft)
- Length: 97.00 metres (318.24 ft)
- Spillway: Flat, ungated
- Year of completion: 1979
- Crest level: EL 983.00 m
- Name of project: Sabarigiri HEP
- Purpose of project: hydro power
- Installed capacity of the project: 340 MW
