= Meenar-2 Dam =

Diversion dam in Kerala, India

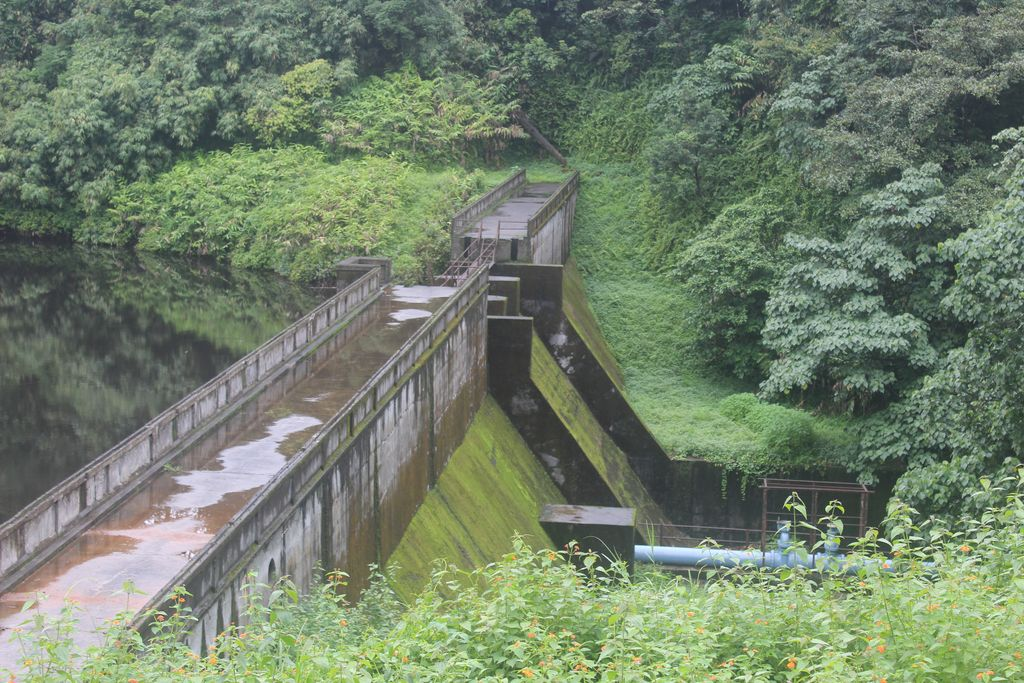
- Meenar-2 Dam

- Location within Kerala
- Country: India
- Location: Pathanamthitta, Kerala
- Coordinates: 9°24′36″N 77°10′43″E
- Purpose: Power generation
- Status: Operational
- Opening date: 1991 (35 years ago)
- Owner: Kerala State Electricity Board

Dam and spillways
- Type of dam: Concrete-Gravity
- Impounds: Meenar river
- Height (foundation): 17.07 m (56 ft)
- Length: 82 m (269 ft)
- Spillway type: Ungated-overflow section

Power Station
- Installed capacity: 340 MW
- Website https://dams.kseb.in

Meenar-2 Dam is a concrete, gravity type of dam constructed across the Meenar river which is a tributary of Pamba river in Seethathodu village of Pathanamthitta district in Kerala, India. This dam is constructed as a part of Sabaigiri Augmentation Scheme.

Sabarigiri Hydro Electric Project ( 340 MW) is the second largest hydro electric project of Kerala and is located in Pathanamthitta district. The reservoir receives water from Meenar-I reservoir and its own catchment. Water from this reservoir is diverted to Pamba Dam through an open channel. Taluks through which release flow are Ranni, Konni, Kozhencherry, Thiruvalla, Chengannur, Kuttanadu, Mavelikara and Karthikappally.

== Specifications ==
- Panchayath : Seethathodu
- Classification : MH (Medium Height)
- River Basin : Pamba
- Release from Dam to river : Pamba
- Name of Project : Sabarigiri HEP
- Maximum Water Level (MWL) : EL 1043.5 m
- Full Reservoir Level ( FRL) : EL 1041.5 m
- Storage at FRL : 0.06 Mm3
- Crest Level : EL 1041.5 m
- River Outlet : 1 No., Circular type, 60 cm diameter.
