= Meenar-1 Dam =

Diversion dam in Kerala, India

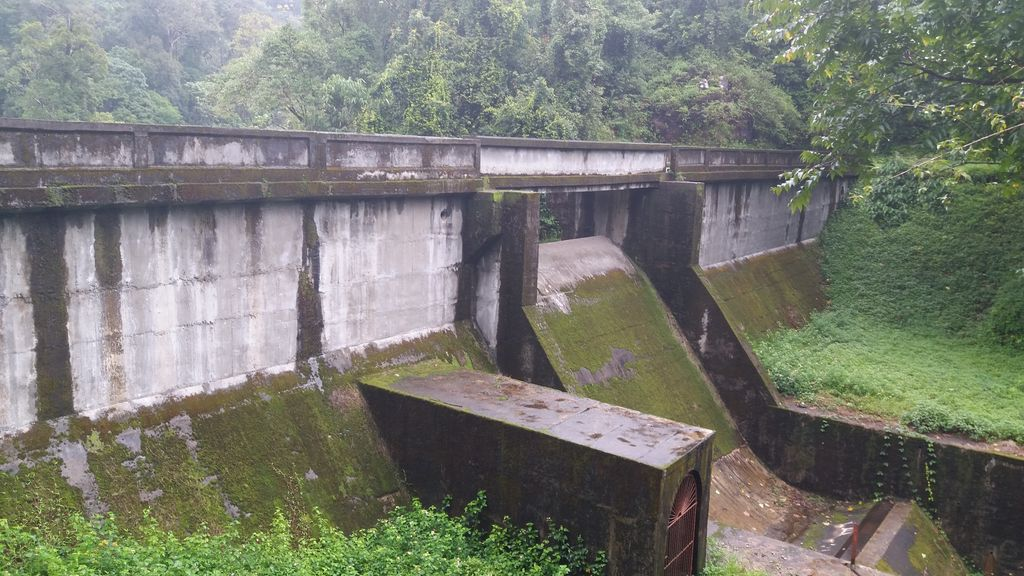

- Location within Kerala
- Country: India
- Location: Pathanamthitta, Kerala
- Coordinates: 9°24′59″N 77°10′33″E
- Purpose: Power generation
- Status: Operational
- Opening date: 1991 (35 years ago)
- Owner: Kerala State Electricity Board

Dam and spillways
- Type of dam: Concrete-Gravity
- Impounds: Meenar river
- Height (foundation): 17.20 m (56 ft)
- Length: 36.75 m (121 ft)
- Spillway type: Ungated- overflow section

Power Station
- Installed capacity: 340 MW
- Website https://dams.kseb.in

Meenar-1 Dam is a concrete, gravity dam constructed across Meenar river in Seethathodu village of Pathanamthitta district in Kerala, India. It is a diversion dam built as a part of Sabarigiri hydro electric project.

Sabarigiri Hydro Electric Project (340 MW) is the second largest hydro electric project of Kerala and is located in Pathanamthitta district. This dam was constructed as a part of Sabaigiri Augmentation Scheme. The reservoir receives water from Kullar- Gavi reservoir and its own catchment. Water from this reservoir is diverted to Meenar – II reservoir through a tunnel. Taluks through which release flows to Pamba river and it flows through Ranni, Konni, Kozhencherry, Thiruvalla, Chengannur, Kuttanadu, Mavelikara and Karthikappally.

== Specifications ==
- River Basin : Pamba
- Release from Dam to river: Pamba
- Name of the project : Sabarigiri HEP
- Classification : MH ( Medium Height)
- Maximum Water Level (MWL) : EL 1077.2 m
- Full Reservoir Level ( FRL)EL 1076.0 m
- Storage at FRL : 0.03 Mm3
- Crest LevelEL : 1076.0 m
- River Outlet : Pamba
