= Kakki Reservoir =

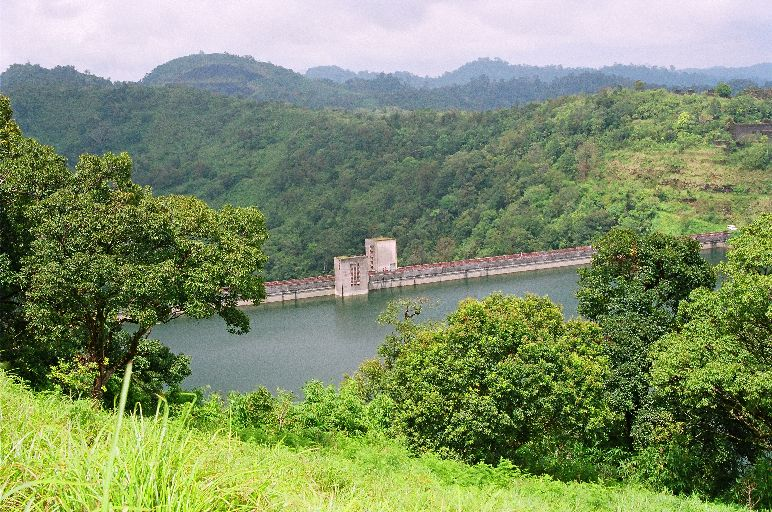

- Location within Kerala Location within India
- Country: India
- Location: Pathanamthitta, Kerala
- Coordinates: 9°19′27″N 77°09′21″E
- Purpose: Power

Reservoir
- Creates: Kakki Reservoir
- Total capacity: 454,200,000 m^{3} (1.604×10^{10} cu ft)
- Inactive capacity: 76,300,000 m^{3} (2.69×10^{9} cu ft)
- Catchment area: 225.33 km^{2} (87.00 sq mi)
- Surface area: 17.51 km^{2} (6.76 sq mi)
- Maximum water depth: 982.16 m (3,222.3 ft)
- Normal elevation: 981.46 m (3,220.0 ft)

Kakki Reservoir is a reservoir, located in Pathanamthitta district of Kerala, India. The lake, which was created when Kakki Dam (9.3253°N 77.1420°E) and Anathode dam (9.3413°N 77.1503°E) were built, is on one of the tributaries of Pamba, the Kakki tributary. The dams were built in 1966 as part of the Sabarigiri Hydro Electric Project. Full reservoir level (FRL) is 981.45 meters above sea level according to the operators of the "twin" reservoirs, the Kerala State Electricity Board. The reservoir, which is also a tourist spot, is nestled in the Ranni reserve forest, very close to the Western Ghats.

== Features ==
- Water Spread Area : 17.6 Sq. km.
- Catchment Area :225.51 Sq. km.
- Average Rainfall: 4572 mm
- Full Reservoir Level (FRL):3220 Ft (Above MSL)
- Minimum Drawdown level (MDDL):3135 Ft (Above MSL)
- Effective Storage at FRL:447.76 MCM
- Energy Equivalent at FRL :722.2 MU
- Average head at power house :2499 ft

== See also ==
- List of dams and reservoirs in Kerala
