= Sabarigiri Hydro Electric Project =

Hydro electric project in Kerala

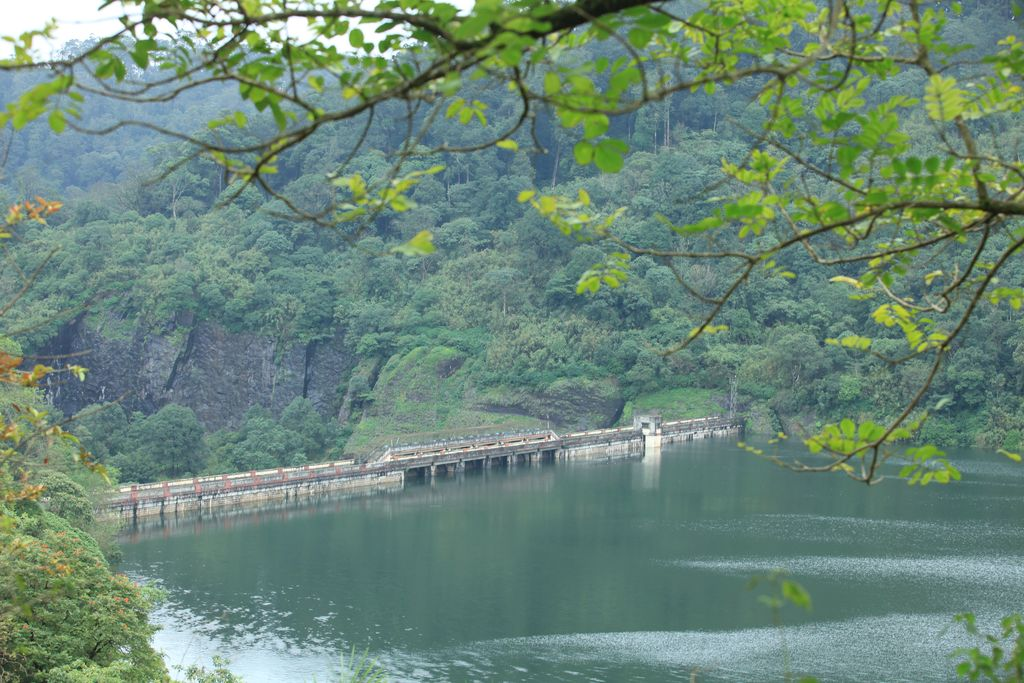
Pamba Dam is a dam built on the river Pampa in the Ranni forest area of Seethathodu Grama Panchayat in Pathanamthitta district of Kerala. It was built in 1967 as part of the Sabarigiri Hydroelectric Project.

Sabarigiri Hydro Electric Project is the second largest hydro electric project in Kerala. The Pamba River and its tributary the Kakki River are dammed up to form two separate reservoirs which are connected by a 3.21 km long underground tunnel. The Sabarigiri Powerhouse is then fed from Kakki reservoir. Originally commissioned in 1966 with an installed capacity of 300 MW, from 2005 to 2009, the capacity was increased to 340 MW.

The Kakki reservoir is formed by the Kakki Dam and Anathode Dam that form a shared reservoir connected by a natural valley. Anathode is a stream which joins Kakki River downstream of Kakki Dam.

The Pamba reservoir is formed by the Pamba Dam.

The Kakki and Pamba dam were completed in 1966 and Anathodu Dam in 1967.

Pamda reservoir has a catchment area of 90.88 km^{2} with a full reservoir level (FRL) at 3,236 ft (986 m) above MSL and a minimum drawdown level (MDDL) of 3,160 ft (960 m) above MSL, providing an effective storage at FRL of 31,450,000 m^{3}.

Kakki reservoir has a catchment area of 225.51 km^{2} with a FRL at 3,220 ft (980 m) above MSL and a minimum drawdown level of 3,135 ft (956 m) above MSL, providing an effective storage at FRL of 447,760,000 m^{3}.

== History ==
Work on Pamba Dam started in 1962. Originally commissioned in 1966 with an installed capacity of 300 MW, from 2005 to 2009, the capacity was increased to 340 MW. In 1966 the capacity of the reservoir was twice as big as that of all other hydro-electric reservoirs in Kerala combined.

On 2 December 1968 the Deputy Minister of Irrigation and Power Ishri Siddheswar Prasad answered questions in Lok Sabha about a defective stator steel stampings supplied by a foreign firm. He stated that the stampings were found badly/rusted and unserviceable due to defects in production and transport and were replaced at a cost of Rs. 13 lakhs. The manufacturer had disputed the damages.

A generator was destroyed in a fire on 16 May 2008, the generator was then dismantled and replaced with a 60 MW generator on 6 May 2014.

At 5.53 pm 1 April 2022 a 60 MW power generator failed due to a winding failure. KSEB, the operator, had found the winding to be weak in the power generators in an evaluation two months before and had planned to rewind them in the coming year. At the time of failure there were two units with a capacity of 60 MW and four units with a capacity of 55 MW.

== Sabaigiri Augmentation Scheme ==
The upper reaches of the Moozhiyar River, a tributary of the Pamba River, flow on the southern side of the Kakki reservoir. The Upper Moozhiyar Dam diverts water to the Kakki–Anathode reservoir through a tunnel. The surplus over the storage flows over to the Moozhiyar River. The Upper Moozhiyar Dam was completed in 1979.

The Kullar Dam and Gavi Dam form a common reservoir. Water from this reservoir is diverted to Meenar–I reservoir through a tunnel before being diverted by another tunnel to Meenar–II reservoir. Water from this reservoir is diverted to Pamba Dam through an open channel.

Water from Kochu Pamba Weir is pumped into the Pamba reservoir through a pump house located downstream from Pamba Dam.

Kullar, Gavi, Meenar–I, and Meenar–II were completed in 1990.

== Pamba Irrigation Scheme ==
The Pamba Irrigation scheme in Pattanamthitta district is aimed at the utilization of the tail race water of Sabarigiri Hydro Electric project for irrigation purposes. After the tail water has entered the Kakkad River it is picked up by a barrage in Maniyar.

The 21,135 hectares (211.35 km^{2}) of ayacut are located in the Pathanamthitta and Alapuzha districts. An estimated 81,600 tonnes of paddy are produced by this project.

== Kakkad Hydro Electric Project ==
The Kakkad Hydro Electric Project utilizes the tail race water from Sabarigiri power station and water from the Moozhiyar and Velluthode rivers. Two dams store water for the powerhouse. The main reservoir is on the Moozhiyar downstream of the confluence with the tail race water from Sabarigiri power station. A tunnel connects this reservoir to Kakkad Power Station. The second reservoir is formed by the Veluthodu Dam, across the Velluthode River, a tributary of Kakkad River. After generating power, water is released to the Kakkad River. The Kakkad River, also called Kakkatar, is a tributary of the Pamba River.
