= Peruvaripallam Dam =

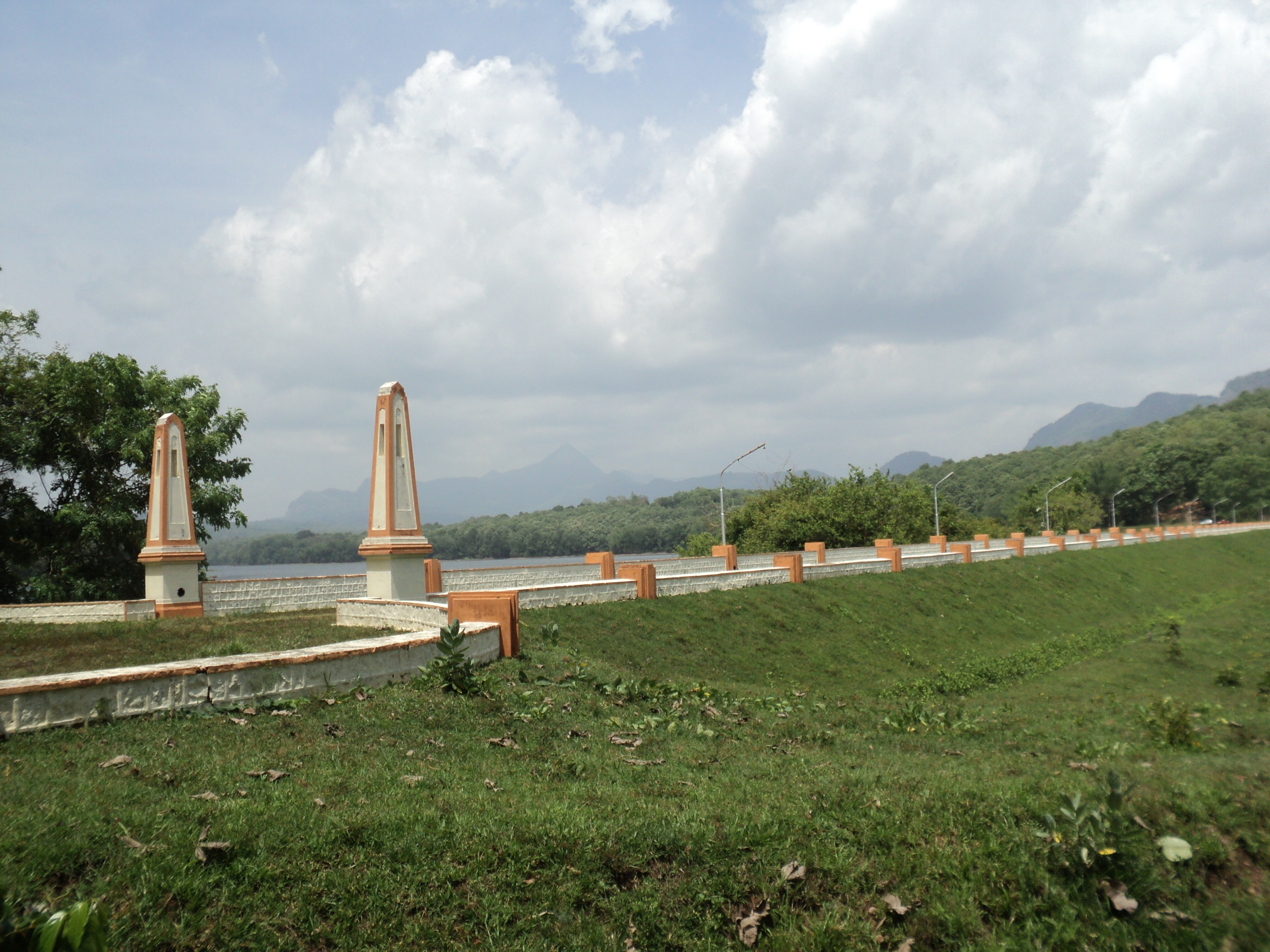

- Location within India Location within Kerala Location within Tamil Nadu
- Official name: പെരുവരിപാലം
- Location: Palakkad district, Kerala
- Coordinates: 10°26′51″N 76°46′0″E
- Opening date: 1971; 55 years ago

Dam and spillways
- Height: 27.74 m (91.0 ft)
- Length: 466 m (1,529 ft)

Peruvaripallam Dam is an earth-filled embankment dam on the Peruvaripallam River in Palakkad district of Kerala, India. The dam's reservoir is connected to the nearby Thunacadavu Reservoir to the south by an open cut channel. It is part of the Parambikulam Aliyar (Irrigation) Project. The Parambikulam Dam is located to the south.
