= Thunakkadavu Dam =

- Location within India Location within Kerala
- Official name: തൂണക്കടവ് അണക്കെട്ട്
- Country: India
- Location: Palakkad district, Kerala
- Coordinates: 10°26′3″N 76°46′54″E
- Purpose: Water supply
- Status: Operational
- Opening date: 1965
- Owner: Tamilnadu

Dam and spillways
- Impounds: Thunacadavu River
- Height: 26.91 m (88.3 ft)
- Length: 314 m (1,030 ft)
- Spillway type: Ogee
- Spillway capacity: 495 m^{3}/s (17,500 cu ft/s)

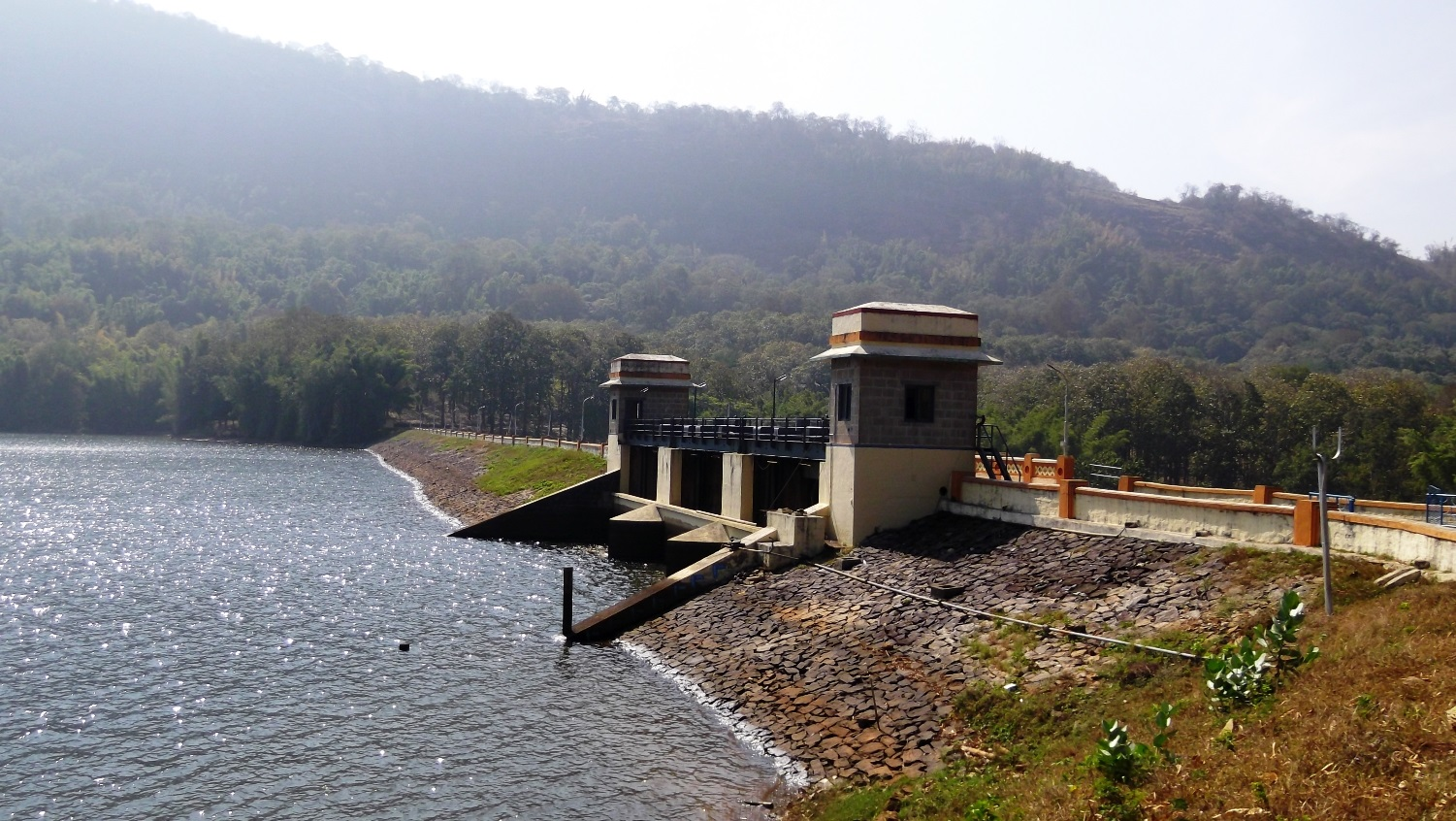
Thoonakkadavu Dam

Thunakkadavu Dam is situated in Parambikulam Wildlife Sanctuary, Kerala across Thoonakkadavu River, which is a tributary of Parambikulam River, in Palakkad district of Kerala, India. It is part of the Parambikulam-Aliyar Irrigation Project. It is in the Parambikulam Wildlife Sanctuary in the Muthalamada panchayath.

This is a small balancing Reservoir with gross capacity of 557 Mcft. The water that is received from Prambikulam Reservoir and from the Peruvaripallam Reservoir, as well as from its own catchment, is diverted to the Sarkarpathy Power House through the Sarkarpathy Power Tunnel. The Peruvaripallam Dam is connected to the Parambikulam Dam by a canal through a 2.5 km (1.6 mi) long underground tunnel. The Poringalkuthu reservoir gets water from catchments downstream of Parambikulam and Thunakadavu dams.

== Reservoir ==
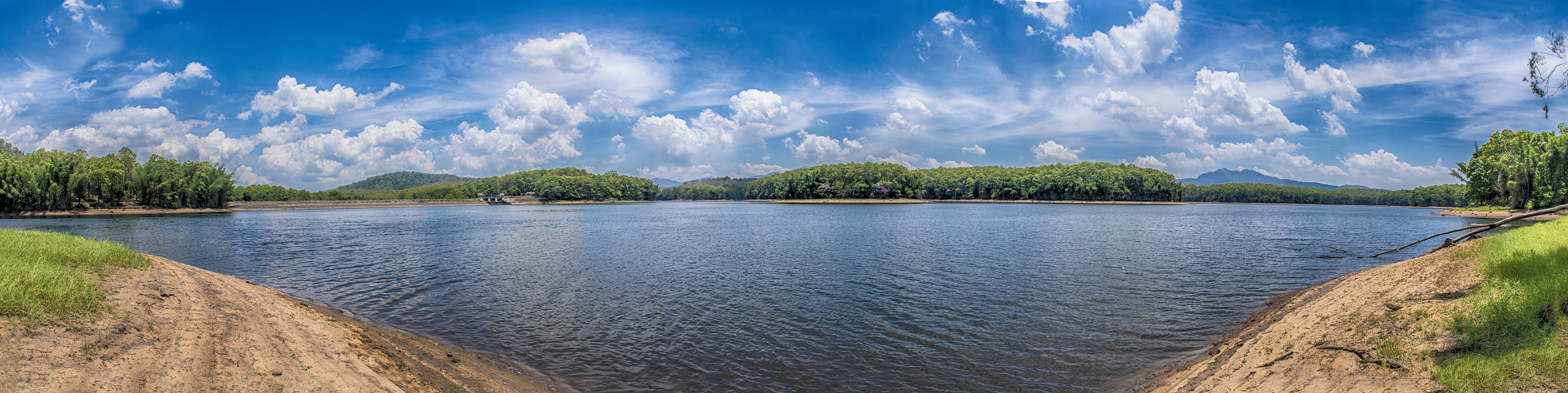
Thoonakadavu Reservoir

An adjacent canal also flows from this river to the reservoir. Reservoir attracts fishing businesses. Tourism is also developed around the Reservoir. Water from Parambikulam dam drains to Thoonakadavu by gravity and after generation of 30 mW power at Sircarpathy, it will go through a Canal to reach Thirumurthi Dam.

== Sharing of water ==
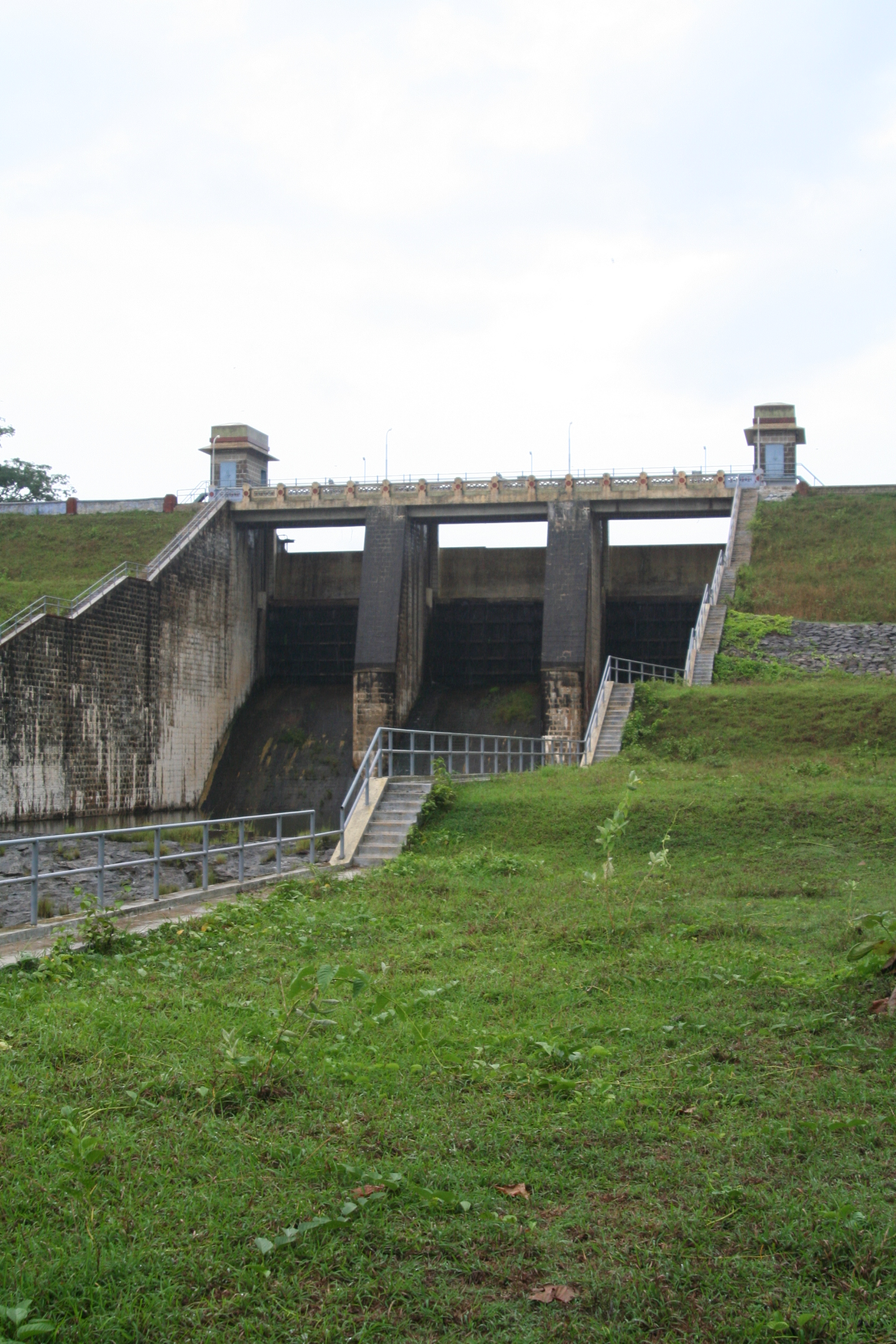
Spillways

The water stored in the dam reservoir is used mainly for agriculture. Kerala needs to get water every year from The Parambikulam-Aliyar project and Tamil Nadu will provide 7.25 TMC from the proposed project.
