= Parambikulam River =

River in Kerala, India

Parambikulam River is one of four tributaries of the Chalakkudi River, originating in the Coimbatore district of Tamil Nadu, India. It flows parallel to and north of the Sholayar River before joining Kuriarkutty. The Sholayar River flows for 44.8 km, then turns north and joins the Parambikulam River 1.6 km before Orukumbankutty. The Karapara River originates from the Nelliyampathy Hills of Palakkad district in Kerala. It flows west and turns southwest and drains into the Parambikulam River at Orukumbankutty.

The Parambikulam Dam was constructed across the river at Anamalai, located in the Western Ghats of Kerala. This dam is the largest in India and ranks in the top ten dams in the world by volume capacity.
