= Veluthodu Dam =

Diversion dam in Kerala, India

Veluthodu dam
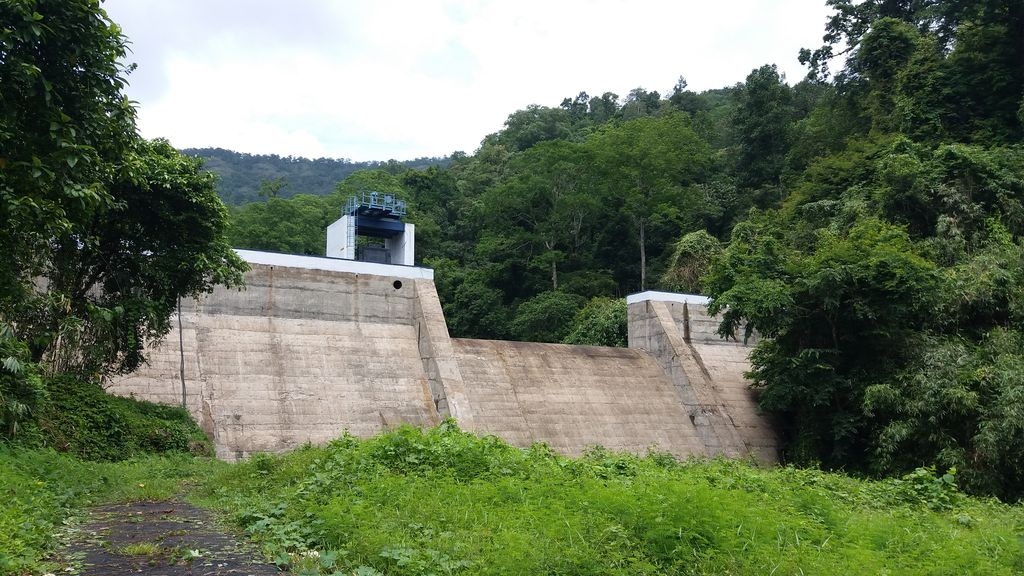
- Interactive map of Veluthodu dam
- Country: India
- Location: Chittar, Pathanamthitta district, Kerala
- Coordinates: 9°18′6″N 77°2′22″E
- Status: Operational

Veluthodu dam (Malayalam: വെളുത്തോട് അണക്കെട്ട് ) is a part of Kakkad Hydro Electric Project and is located in Seethathode panchayath of Ranni Taluk in Pathanamthitta District of Kerala, India. It's a Concrete-Gravity dam built across the Veluthodu river, a tributary of Kakkad River which is again a tributary of Pamba River. The dam is built primarily for electricity. This diversion dam diverts water to the water conductor system from Moozhiyar reservoir to Kakkad Power Station. This power station utilises the tail race water from Sabarigiri power station and flow received from moozhiyar and velluthode rivers. After power generation, water from Kakkad power station is released to the Kakkad River. Taluks through which release flow are Ranni, Konni, Kozhencherry, Thiruvalla, Chengannur, Kuttanadu, Mavelikara and Karthikappally. It is operated by Kerala State Electricity Board.

== Specifications ==
- Latitude : 9⁰ 18′ 10 ” N
- Longitude: 77⁰ 02′ 30” E
- Village : Seethathodu
- Panchayath : Seethathodu
- District : Pathanamthitta
- River Basin : Pamba
- River : Veluthode ar
- Release from Dam to river : Kakkad river
- Name of Project : Kakkad HEP
- Year of completion : 1990
- Type of Dam : Concrete – Gravity
- Classification : MH (Medium Height)
- Maximum Water Level (MWL)EL 195.00 m
- Full Reservoir Level ( FRL) : EL 192.00 m
- Storage at FRL : 0.67 Mm3
- Height from deepest foundation : 20.50 m
- Length : 107.00 m
- Spillway : Ungated- Overflow section
- Crest LevelEL : 192.00 m
- River Outlet : 1 No. 1.80 x 2.70 m
- Purpose of Project : Hydro Power
- Reservoir Capacity : 0.18 billion gallon / (0.67 million cubic meter)

== Reservoir ==
The reservoir is formed by the Veluthodu dam, constructed across Velluthode river.

- Water Spread Area : 0.0635 Sq. km.
- Full Reservoir Level (FRL) : 192 m
- Minimum Drawdown level (MDDL) : 186 m
- Effective Storage at FRL : 0.607 MCM
- Energy Equivalent at FRL : 0.187 MU

== Kakkad Hydro Electric Project ==
The Kakkad Hydroelectric Project generates 50 MW of electricity using 2 turbines of 25 MW each year. The annual output is 262 MU. The machine was commissioned on 16 September 1999. The Moozhiyar Dam creates the main reservoir of this project. the second reservoir is formed by the Veluthodu dam. After power generation, water from Kakkad power station is released to the Kakkad River. The prime mover is a vertical shaft francis Turbine.

The Kakkad project had a long tale of unending woes of corruption and trade union militancy.
