= Pamba Dam =

Dam in Kerala, India

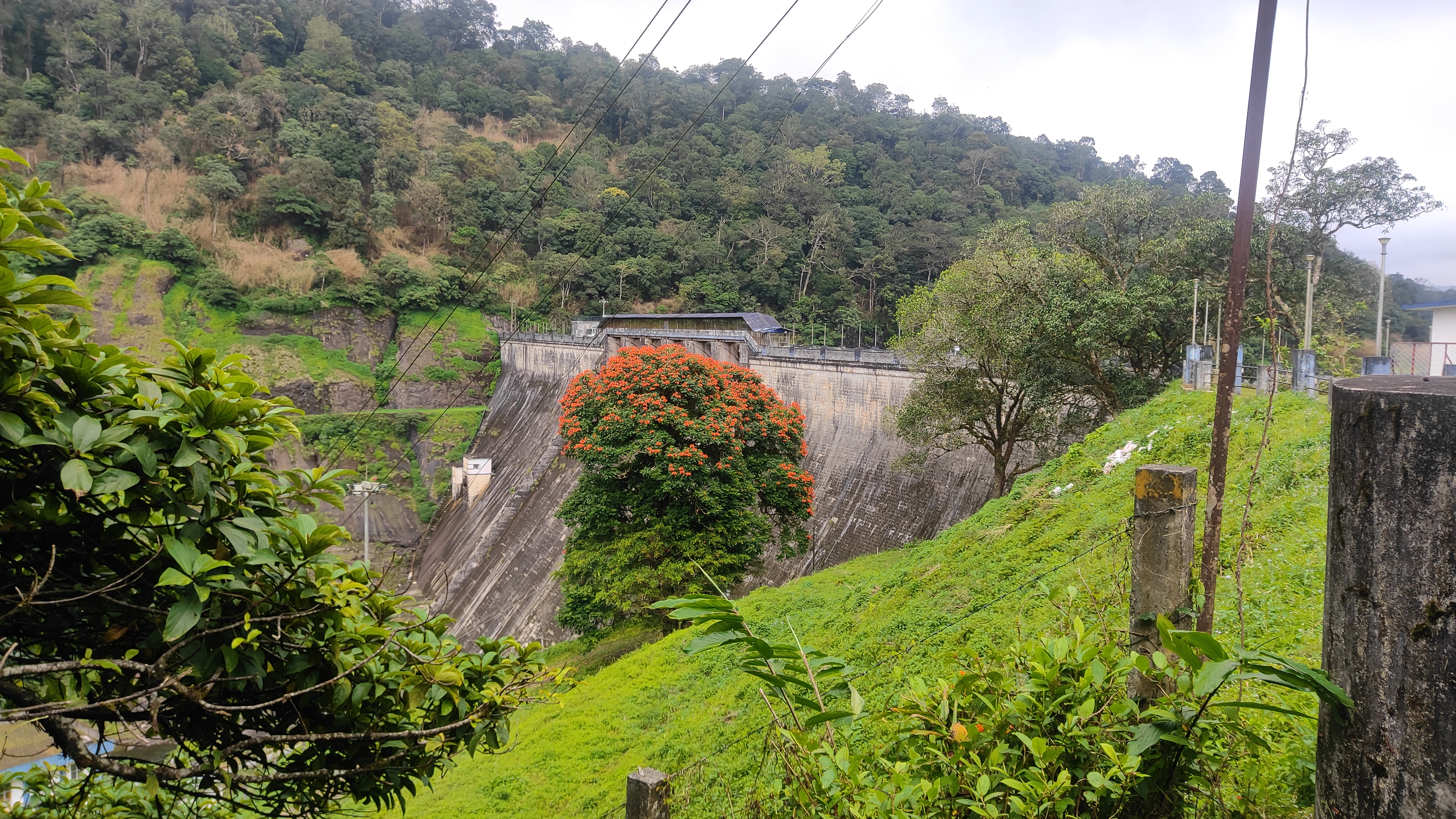

- Location within Kerala Location within India
- Country: India
- Location: Pathanamthitta, Kerala
- Coordinates: 9°23′26″N 77°09′35″E
- Purpose: Power
- Status: Operational
- Opening date: 1967 (59 years ago)
- Owner: Kerala State Electricity Board

Dam and spillways
- Type of dam: Gravity dam
- Impounds: Pamba river
- Height (foundation): 57.2 m (188 ft)
- Length: 281.48 m (923.5 ft)
- Elevation at crest: 981.46 m (3,220.0 ft)
- Spillways: 6 nos, radial gates, each of size 7.0 x 4.87 m
- Spillway capacity: 912 m^{3}/s (32,200 cu ft/s)

Reservoir
- Creates: Pamba Reservoir
- Total capacity: 39,220,000 m^{3} (1.385×10^{9} cu ft)
- Catchment area: 90.88 km^{2} (35.09 sq mi)
- Maximum water depth: 986.33 m (3,236.0 ft)
- Normal elevation: 986.33 m (3,236.0 ft)

Sabarigiri Power Station
- Coordinates: 9°18′36″N 77°04′22″E
- Operator: Kerala State Electricity Board
- Commission date: 1967 (59 years ago)
- Turbines: 2 x 60 MW & 4 x 55 MW (Pelton-type)
- Installed capacity: 340 MW
- Annual generation: 1338 MU
- Website; Official website

Pamba Dam is a gravity dam built on the Pamba river in the Ranni forest area of Seethathodu panchayat in Pathanamthitta district of Kerala, India. It was built in 1967 as part of the Sabarigiri Hydroelectric Project. Sabarigiri Hydro Electric Project (IHEP) is the second largest hydro electric project in Kerala. Pamba dam's reservoir is connected to the nearby Kakki dam's reservoir by a 3.21 km (1.99 mi) long underground tunnel. The dam is 281 m (922 ft) long and 57.2 m (188 ft) high and is located at an elevation of 981.45 m (3,220.0 ft) above sea level. The dam is located in a forest area adjacent to the Periyar National Park. The water stored in the Pamba and Kakki dams is conveyed to the Sabarigiri powerhouse through penstock pipes. The dam was commissioned in 1967.

== History ==
The Project plan was to create a reservoir by impounding Pampa River and another reservoir by impounding Kakki River and connecting both the reservoirs by means of a tunnel to form a connected reservoir. Preliminary work and investigation were done in 1958, and the dam construction was started in 1960. Masonry work started in 1961. Completion of dam as per the 1960 schedule was in 1964. Actual completion of the total project was in 1967. Tools and plants, both indigenous and imported, were used in the construction of the Pamba dam. Natural sand was not available in the nearest localities and hence, except in the case of power house, crushed sand was used. For this purpose, eight crushing and screening plants were installed. As a trial and error, 10 to 20 per cent river sand was mixed with the crushed sand to bring the fineness modulus, but the improvement was not good enough. So, new screens were built and fitted. Due to river diversion problems, difficulties related to excavation in the river bed was delayed. Because of that, the progress of masonry construction was below the target. Sand was collected from the upstream and downstream of the river, then was washed and used until the crushers came into operation.

Cement for the dam came from Thulukkapatty in Tamil Nadu and the main storage of cement was at Theni, from where the cement was transported to the dam site and kept in the departmental cement store.

=== Excavation for the dam ===
It was assumed that there will not be much excavation to be done. But in reality this had increased much and a quantity of 4,92,000 cubic feet of earth work excavation had to be done for the dam foundation. Disintegrated rock and boulders had to be removed and foundation taken to deeper levels. Machineries could not be used and manual labor had to be used.

=== River bed excavation and coffer dam ===
To take up the excavation in the river bed, a masonry coffer dam was constructed. The top width of the 285 dam was 2 feet to 2.5 feet and the maximum height was 20 feet.

=== Concrete foundation and spill way ===
It was originally proposed to be constructed with cement mortar blended with 20 per cent surki. But after finding from laboratory tests that sufficient strength had not been achieved by using surki, Cement was used instead of surki.

== Dam Features ==
- Type of Dam: Masonry – Gravity
- Classification: HH (High Height)
- Maximum Water Level (MWL): EL 986.33 meters
- Full Reservoir Level ( FRL): EL 986.33 meters
- Height from deepest foundation: 57.00 meters
- Length: 281.48 meters
- Spillway: 6 No. radial gates, each of size 7.0 x 4.87 meters
- Crest Level: EL 981.46 meters
- River Outlet: 1 No., Hollow jet valve, 1.8 m diameter
- Name of Project: Sabarigiri HEP
- Purpose of Project: Hydro Power
- Year of completion: 1967

== Reservoir ==
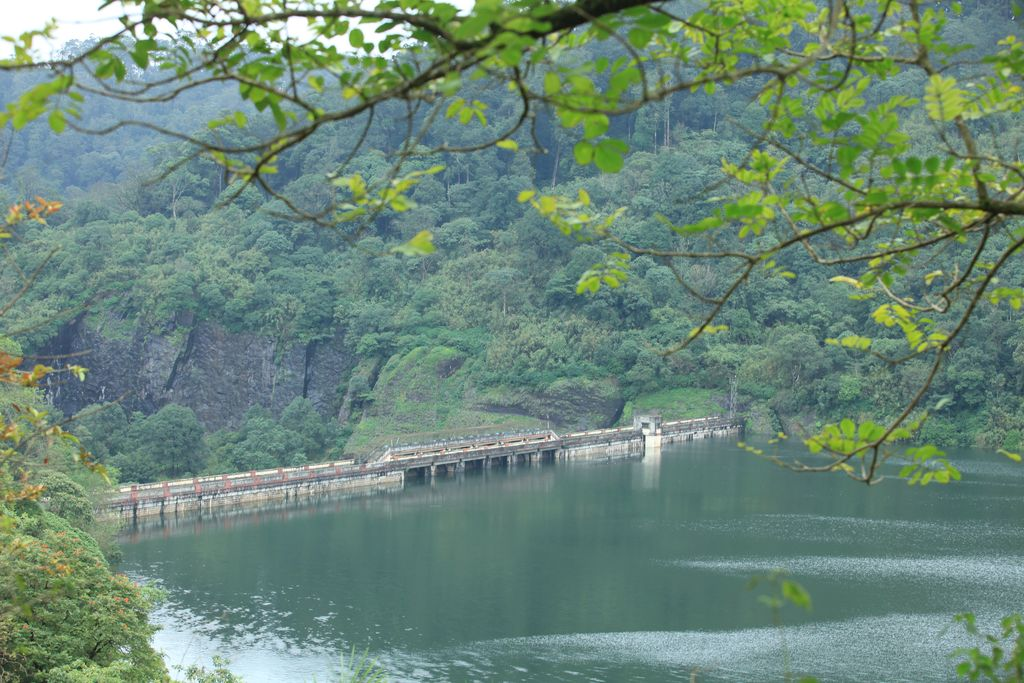
With reservoir

This reservoir is formed by the Pamda dam constructed across Pamba river. The water from this reservoir is flowing to the Kakki reservoir through an underground tunnel of length 3.21 km. Water Spread Area /Catchment Area is 90.88 Sq. km. Average Rainfall is 4572 mm. Full Reservoir Level (FRL) is 3236 Ft (Above MSL), Minimum Drawdown level (MDDL) is 3160 Ft (Above MSL) and Effective Storage at FRL is 31.45 MCM

== Sabarigiri Hydro Electric Project ==
Sabarigiri Hydro Electric Project is the second largest hydro electric project in Kerala. This Indo American project was commissioned in 1966 with an installed capacity of 300 MW. In 2005 to 2009, The capacity was increased to 340 MW. The Power Station was commissioned during 1966 -67 with six generators having vertical shaft pelton turbine as the prime mover. After power generation, water from the power station is released to the Moozhiyar reservoir The Pamba Irrigation scheme in Pattanamthitta district is aimed at the utilization of the tail race water of Sabarigiri Hydro Electric project for irrigation purposes.

== Tourism ==
It is one of the tourist spots around Pampa river. The place offers some of the eco tourism activities like boat ride, jeep safari and Sabarimala view.
