= Kullar Dam =

Diversion dam in Kerala, India

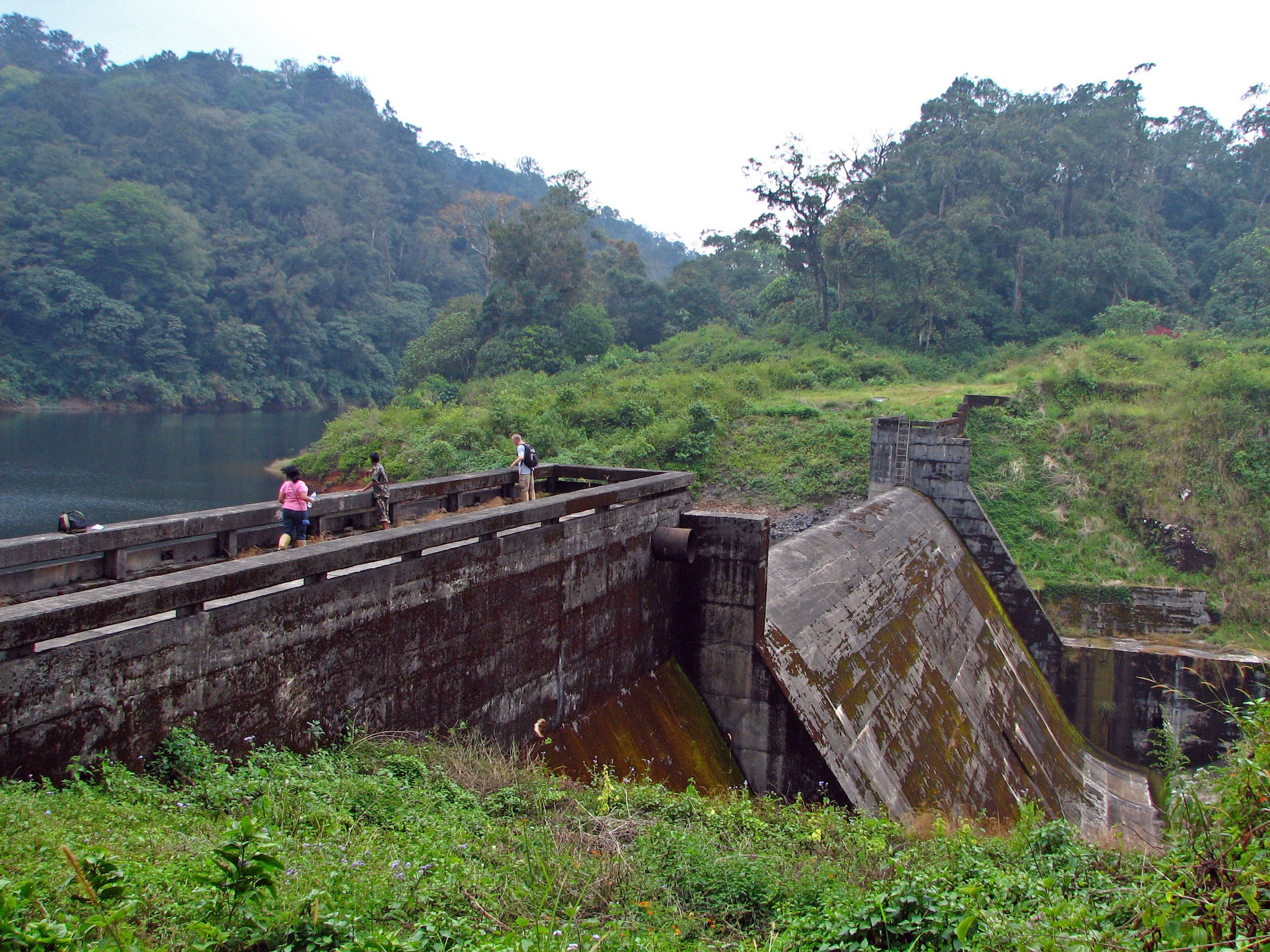
- In 2007

- Location within Kerala
- Country: India
- Location: Pathanamthitta, Kerala
- Coordinates: 9°24′30″N 77°08′40″E
- Purpose: Power generation
- Status: Operational
- Opening date: 1990 (36 years ago)
- Owner: Kerala State Electricity Board

Dam and spillways
- Type of dam: Concrete-Gravity
- Impounds: Kullar river
- Height (foundation): 24 m (79 ft)
- Length: 94 m (308 ft)
- Spillway type: Ungated-overflow section

Power Station
- Installed capacity: 340 MW
- Website https://dams.kseb.in

Kullar Dam is a small, flanking dam which impounds Kullar river in Seethathodu village of Pathanamthitta district in Kerala, India. The dam was built as a part of Sabarigiri Hydroelectric Project. The release from the dam flows to Pamba river and from there, it flows through Ranni, Konni, Kozhencherry, Thiruvalla, Chengannur, Kuttanadu, Mavelikara and Karthikappally taluks.

It is a Concrete Gravity dam with 24 metres (79 ft) height and 94 metres (308 ft) length. Construction of the dam was completed in 1990.

== Specifications ==
- Panchayath : Seethathodu
- River Basin : Pamba
- Release from Dam to river : Pamba
- Name of Project : Sabarigiri HEP
- Classification : MH (Medium Height)
- Maximum Water Level (MWL) : EL 1139.2 m
- Full Reservoir Level ( FRL) : EL 1136.9 m
- Storage at FRL : 2.78 Mm3
- Crest Level : EL 1136.90
- River Outlet : 1 No., Circular type, 60 cm diameter

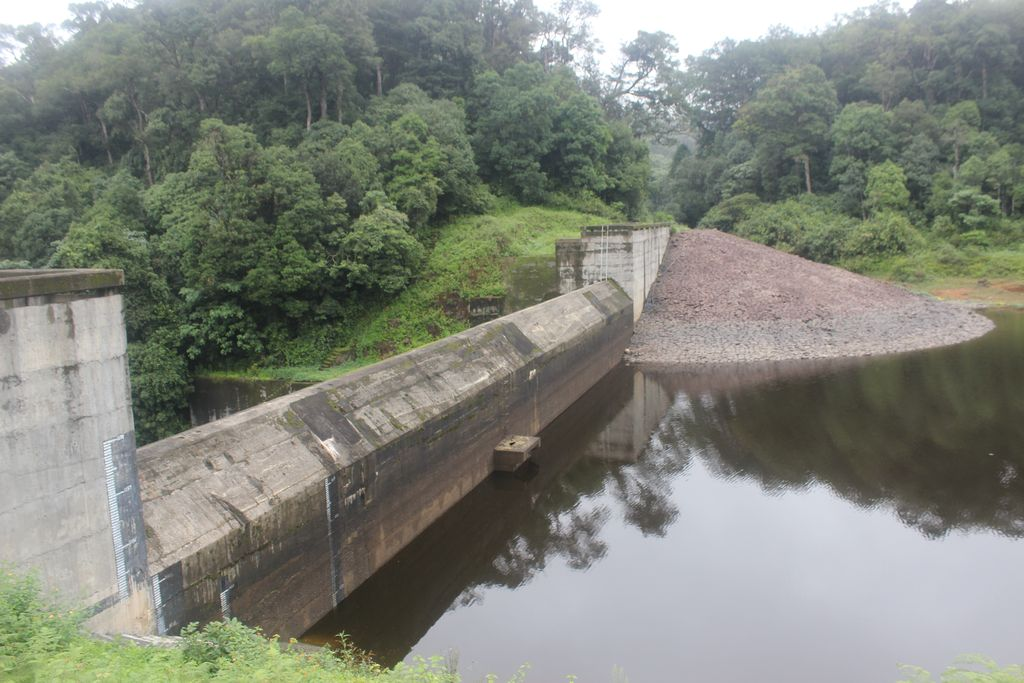
Barrage seen from reservoir side

== Power Generation ==
The Sabarigiri Hydro Electric Project generates 300 MW of electricity using 6 turbines of 50 MW each. Annual production is 1338 MU. The Project is the second largest hydro electric project of Kerala State. The machine was commissioned on November 26, 1967. With continuous upgrades, the capacity was increased from 300 MW to 340 MW by 2009.
