= Meenkara Dam =

Earthen dam in Kerala, India

Meenkara Dam is an embankment or earthen dam built on the banks of the river Gayatripuzha, a tributary of the river Bharathapuzha, at Muthalamada in the Muthalamada Grama Panchayat near Kollengode in the Palakkad district of Kerala with masonry spillway sections. It is part of the Gayatri Irrigation Project. The project was started in 1956 and partially commissioned in 1960. The project was fully completed in 1964. The irrigation scheme has been prepared for agriculture and drinking water in Palakkad district. Farms in Chittoor, Nemmara, Alathur in Palakkad district, and Vadakkancherry in Thrissur district will benefit from this irrigation scheme.

== Description ==
The dam is an earthen dam with total length of 964 metres (3,163 ft), of which 30 metres (98 ft) is a masonry spillway. The height of masonry dam is 18.9 metres, and there are two spillway gates of size 12.19 m × 4.26 m. The width of the dam at its crest is 7 meters.

The canal system consists of two main canals and branch canals. There is a sluice for drawing the water. The size of the canal sluice is 1.52 m × 1.83 m. The left-bank canal, which takes off from the sluice, has a length of 20.5 km, and it receives water from the Chulliyar reservoir also, as it is connected by a leading channel from the Chulliyar dam. The sill level of the canal sluice and river sluice is 143.64 m. The water for the right canal is let down to the river from the Meenkara reservoir and is picked up by a small dam which is 5.5 km downstream.

== Location and purpose ==
The Meenkara dam Project is located in the Muthalamada village in Palakkad District of Kerala. The location of the dam is 10°37′16″N 76°47′51″E. The nearest towns are Kollengode in Kerala and Pollachi in Tamil Nadu. Meenkara Dam meets the water requirements of an ayacut of 3035 hectares. The gross storage capacity of the reservoir is 11.3×10^{6} m^{3} and has a catchment area of 90.65 km^{2}. Out of the gross storage capacity, a minimum permissible storage of 1×10^{6} m^{3} is fixed as dead storage. Meenkara Reservoir is a multipurpose reservoir of which the water stored is mainly used for irrigation. A small part of storage is used for drinking-water supply. Average rainfall is about 1200 mm compared to the state average of 3000 mm.

Water distribution for agriculture begins in November and continues until March. The major crop cultivated in the ayacut is paddy.

== Reservoir ==
The reservoir's catchment area is 90.65 km^{2}, and the maximum water level 156.36 meters.
