= Parambikulam Dam =

Parambikulam Dam പറമ്പിക്കുളം അണക്കെട്ട്
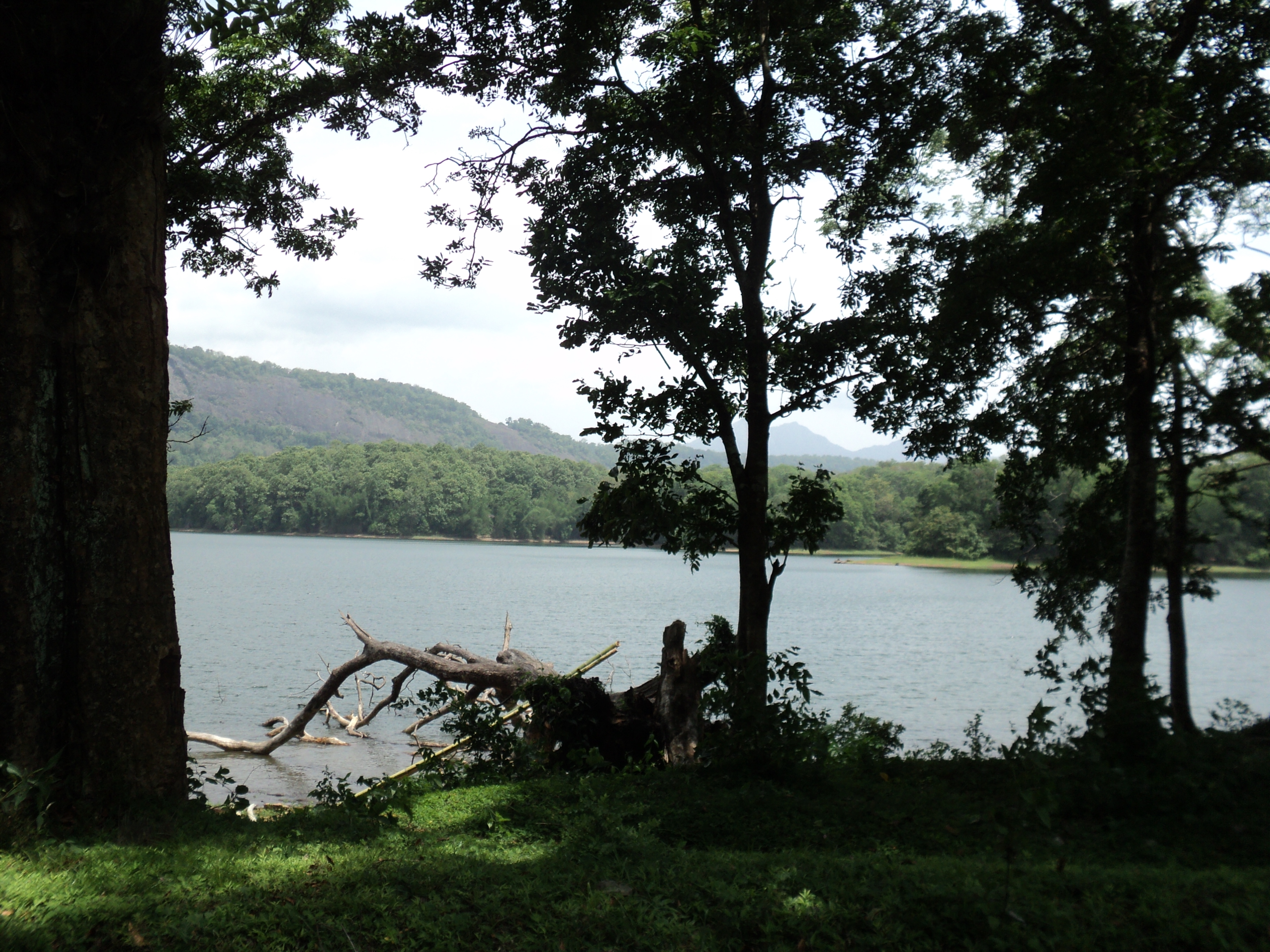
- Parambikkulam Reservoir

- Location within Kerala Location within Tamil Nadu Location within India
- Country: India
- Location: Kerala
- Coordinates: 10°22′40″N 76°45′51″E
- Owner: Kerala
- Operator: Tamil Nadu

Dam and spillways
- Type of dam: Embankment dam
- Impounds: Parambikulam River

Reservoir
- Total capacity: 69,165,000 m^{3} (56,073 acre⋅ft)

Parambikulam Dam is an embankment dam on the Parambikulam River, located in the Palakkad district in the Western Ghats of Kerala, India, ranks number one in India as well as in the top ten embankment dams in the world in volume in the year 2000.

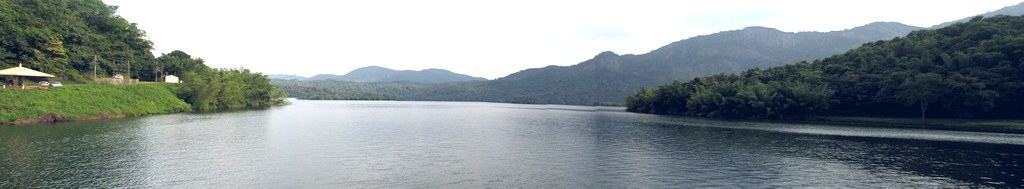
View to the Parambikulam Reservoir

This Dam was built at the time of Kamarajar. This is one of the Major irrigation schemes were planned in Kamaraj's period. The dam is operated and maintained by Tamil Nadu but the ownership rests with Kerala, Per the agreement with Tamil Nadu, Kerala was supposed to receive 7.25 TMC feet of water (out of effective storage of 13.41 Tmcft) per year from the Parambikulam-Aliyar Project of which the Parambikulam Dam is a part. In 2004, Kerala did not receive any water after February 10, resulting in the drying up of paddy in thousands of acres in Chittur taluk. Since this claus of agreement was not met as of July 2006, Kerala Water Resources Minister called for a review of the project agreement.

On 17 October 2012, Kerala and Tamil Nadu reached an accord on Parambikulam-Aliyar water.

== See also ==
- List of dams and reservoirs in India
- Embankment dam
