= Anathode Dam =

Dam in Kerala, India

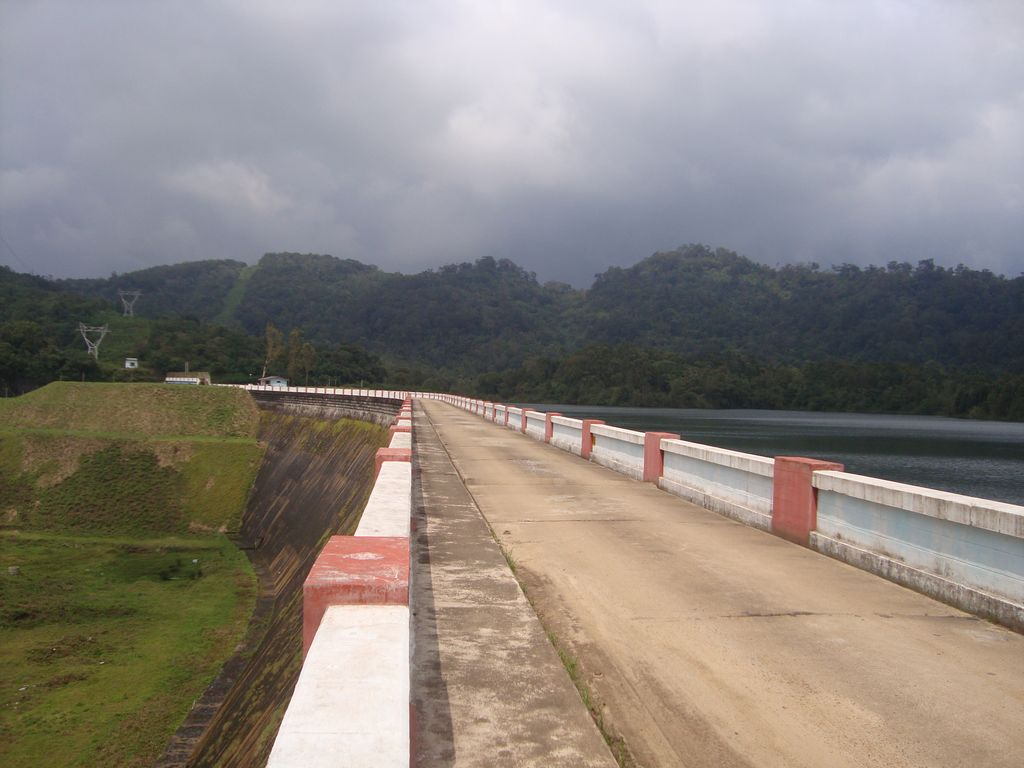

- Location within Kerala Location within India
- Official name: Anathode Flanking Dam
- Country: India
- Location: Seethathodu panchayath, Pathanamthitta, Kerala
- Coordinates: 9°20′30″N 77°09′00″E
- Purpose: Power
- Status: Operational
- Construction began: 1964
- Opening date: 1967
- Owner: Kerala State Electricity Board

Dam and spillways
- Type of dam: Gravity dam
- Impounds: Kakki river
- Height (foundation): 51.81 m (170.0 ft)
- Length: 376.12 m (1,234.0 ft)
- Elevation at crest: 975.36 m (3,200.0 ft)
- Spillways: 4
- Spillway type: Ogee shaped, radial gates, each of size 12.8 x 6.1m
- Spillway capacity: 1785 m^{3}/sec

Reservoir
- Creates: Kakki reservoir
- Total capacity: 455,400,000 m^{3} (1.608×10^{10} cu ft)
- Active capacity: 446,800,000 m^{3} (1.578×10^{10} cu ft)
- Catchment area: 225.51 km^{2} (87.07 sq mi)
- Normal elevation: 981.46 m (3,220.0 ft)

Sabarigiri Power Station
- Operator: Kerala State Electricity Board
- Commission date: 1967
- Turbines: 2 x 60 MW & 4 x 55 MW, Pelton-type
- Installed capacity: 340 MW
- Annual generation: 1338 MU
- Website; KSEB - Official website

Anathode Dam is a flanking dam of masonry gravity type situated in Sethathode panchayath of Seethathode village in Pathanamthitta district of Kerala, India. This dam is constructed on Anathode river which is a tributary of Pamba river.

Anathode is a stream which joins Kakki river downstream of Kakki dam before the confluence with Pamba river. Anathode Dam and the nearby Kakki Dam form a common reservoir, as they are connected through a natural valley. Both dams were built as part of the Sabarigiri Hydro Electric Project. The spillway for the reservoir complex is located by the side of Anathode Flanking Dam. Kakki & Anathode dams are about 4 kilometers apart by road. Taluks through which release flows are Ranni, Konni, Kozhencherry, Thiruvalla, Chengannur, Kuttanadu, Mavelikara and Karthikappally.

== Specifications ==
- Type of Dam: Masonry – Gravity
- River Basin: Pamba
- River:Kakki-Anathodu (a tributary of Pamba river)
- Release from Dam to river: Pamba
- Classification: HH (High Height)
- Maximum Water Level (MWL): EL 982.16 m
- Full Reservoir Level ( FRL) : EL 981.46 m
- Storage at FRL: 454.14 million m^{3}
- Height from deepest foundation: 51.81 m
- Spillway: 4 No. radial gates, each of size 12.8 x 6.1m
- Crest Level: EL 975.36 m
