= Moozhiyar Dam =

Dam in Kerala, India

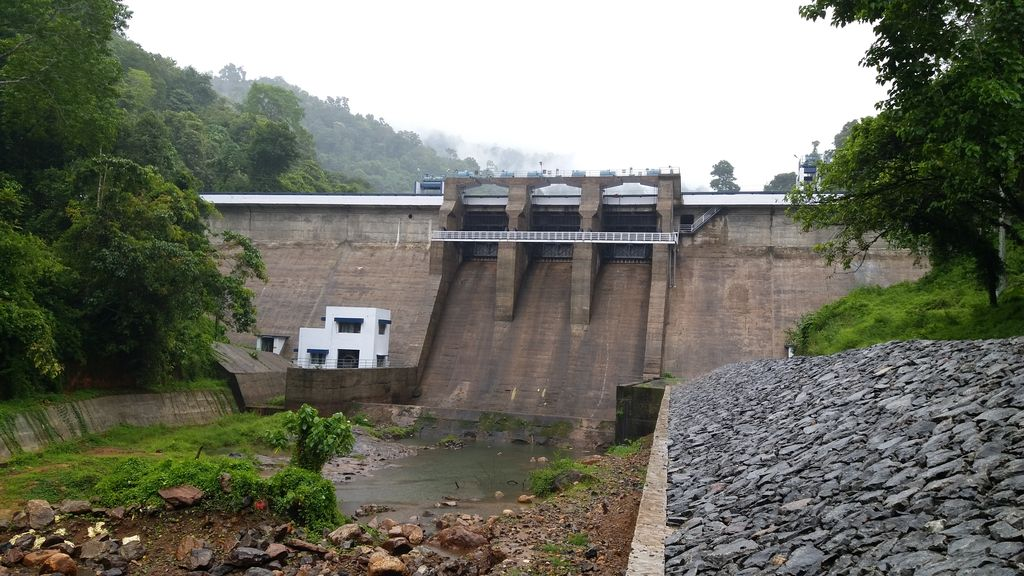

- Location within Kerala Location within India
- Country: India
- Location: Pathanamthitta, Kerala
- Coordinates: 9°18′29″N 77°03′56″E
- Purpose: Power
- Status: Operational
- Opening date: 1999
- Owner: Kerala State Electricity Board

Dam and spillways
- Type of dam: Gravity dam
- Impounds: Kakkattar
- Height (foundation): 30.04 m (98.6 ft)
- Length: 176.5 m (579 ft)
- Elevation at crest: 186.53 m (612.0 ft)
- Width (crest): 6.40 m (21.0 ft)
- Dam volume: ≈ 52,160 m^{3} (1,842,000 cu ft)
- Spillways: 3 nos
- Spillway type: Radial gates, each of size 7.62 × 6.70 m

Reservoir
- Creates: Moozhiyar Reservoir
- Active capacity: 1.16 MCM
- Inactive capacity: 186.36 m (611.4 ft)
- Catchment area: 36.52 km^{2} (14.10 sq mi)
- Surface area: 0.1457 km^{2} (0.0563 sq mi)
- Maximum water depth: 192.94 m (633.0 ft)
- Normal elevation: 192.63 m (632.0 ft)

Kakkad Power Station
- Operator: Kerala State Electricity Board
- Commission date: July 1999
- Turbines: 2 × 25 MW, Francis-type
- Installed capacity: 50 MW
- Annual generation: 262 MU
- Website; KSEB - Official website

Moozhiyar Dam is a gravity dam located close to Kakki reservoir in Seethathodu panchayath of Pathanamthitta district in Kerala, India. The Kakkad Hydroelectric Project is powered by water from the dam. The water level is set at 192.5 meters. KSEB is responsible for the maintenance of the dam and other ancillary works. The Kakkad Hydroelectric Project generates 50 MW of electricity using 2 turbines of 25 MW each year. The annual output is 262 MU. The machine was commissioned on 16 September 1999. Kakkad Hydro electric Project is the second stage development of Pamba river basin. The installed capacity is 50 MW (2 x 25MW). This scheme utilises the tail race water from Sabarigiri power station and flow received from Moozhiyar and Velluthode rivers. Two dams feed water to the powerhouse. The Moozhiyar Dam creates the main reservoir of this project. Taluks through which release flow are Ranni, Konni, Kozhencherry, Thiruvalla, Chengannur, Kuttanadu, Mavelikara and Karthikappally.

== Specifications ==
- Panchayath : Seethathodu
- Village :Seethathodu
- District : Pathanamthitta
- River Basin :Pamba
- River: Kakkad ar
- Release from Dam to river : Kakkad Ar
- Year of completion : 1999
- Type of Dam : Concrete – Gravity
- Classification: HH- ( High Height)
- Maximum Water Level (MWL) : EL 192.94 m
- Full Reservoir Level ( FRL) : EL 192.63 m
- Storage at FRL : 1.50 Mm3
- Height from deepest foundation : 30.04 m
- Length : 176.5 m
- Spillway : 3 Nos. radial gates, each of size 7.62×6.70 m

== Reservoir ==
The water spread area is 0.1457 km^{2} and the Full Reservoir Level (FRL) is at 192.63 m. The Minimum Drawdown level (MDDL) is 181.36 m and the effective storage at FRL is at 1.16 MCM. The Sabarigiri Power Station commissioned during 1966-67, has six generators with vertical shaft Pelton turbine as the prime mover. After power generation, water from the power station is released to the Moozhiyar reservoir.

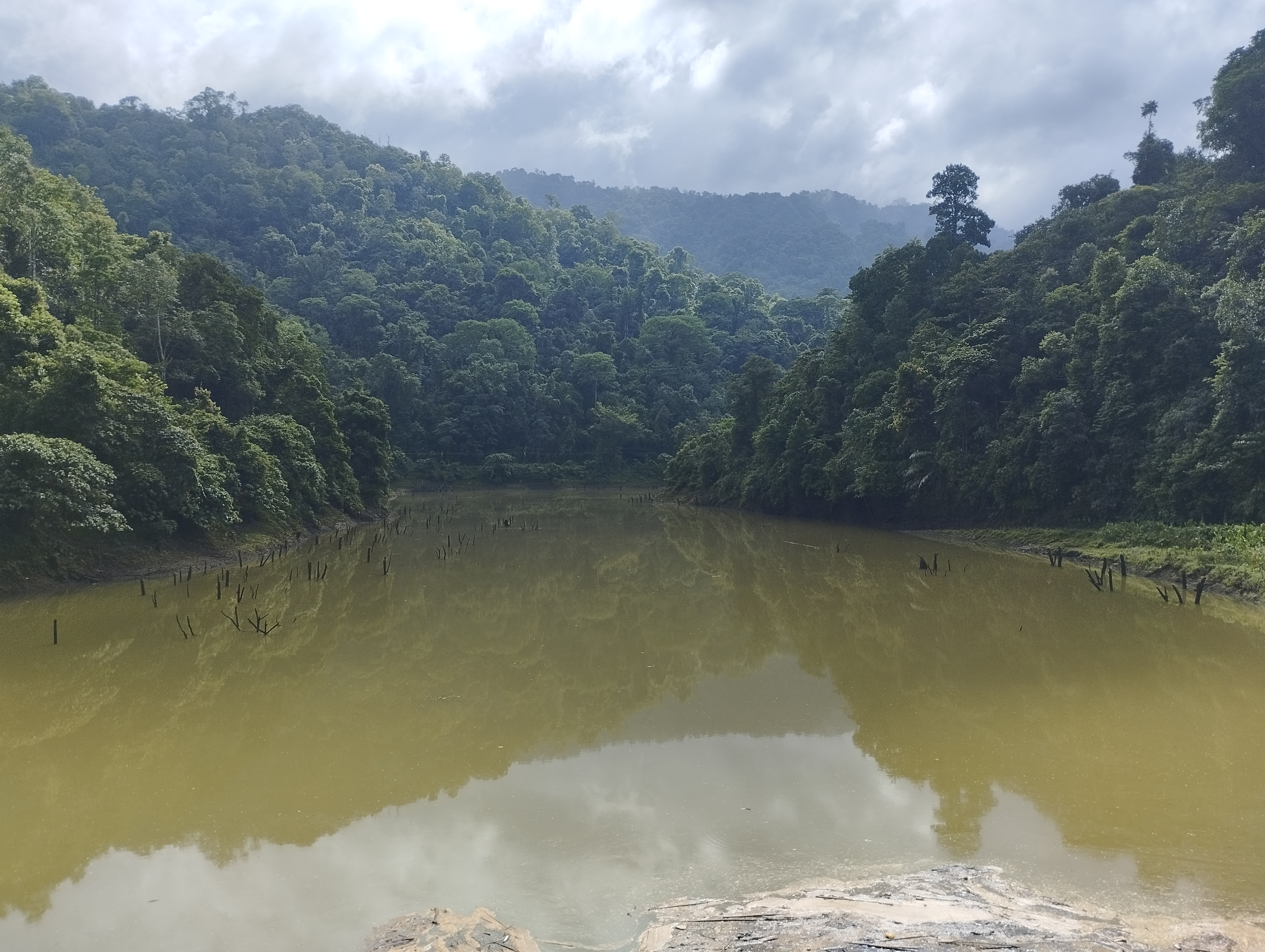
Reservoir from barrage.
