= Kakki Dam =

Dam in Kerala, India

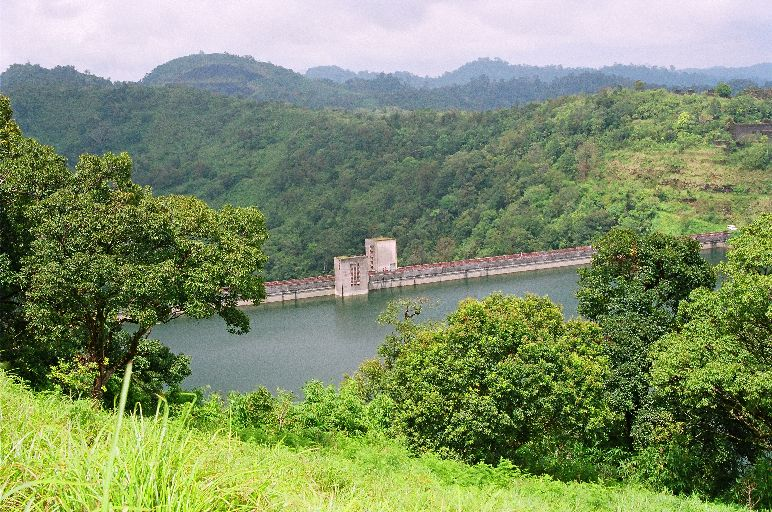
- View of Kakki dam and reservoir

- Location within Kerala Location within India
- Country: India
- Location: Pathanamthitta, Kerala
- Coordinates: 9°19′30″N 77°08′32″E
- Purpose: Power
- Status: Operational
- Construction began: 1962 (64 years ago)
- Opening date: 28 August 1967 (59 years ago)
- Operator: Kerala State Electricity Board

Dam and spillways
- Type of dam: Gravity dam
- Impounds: Kakki river
- Height (foundation): 116.12 m (381.0 ft)
- Length: 336.00 m (1,102.36 ft)
- Elevation at crest: 984.50 m (3,230.0 ft)
- Width (crest): 3.66 m (12.0 ft)
- Spillways: No spillway

Reservoir
- Creates: Kakki Reservoir
- Total capacity: 454,200,000 m^{3} (1.604×10^{10} cu ft)
- Inactive capacity: 76,300,000 m^{3} (2.69×10^{9} cu ft)
- Catchment area: 225.33 km^{2} (87.00 sq mi); Kakki Dam: 217.56 km^{2} (84.00 sq mi); Upper Moozhiyar: 7.77 km^{2} (3.00 sq mi)
- Surface area: 17.51 km^{2} (6.76 sq mi)
- Maximum water depth: 982.16 m (3,222.3 ft)
- Normal elevation: 981.46 m (3,220.0 ft)

Sabarigiri Power Station
- Coordinates: 9°18′36″N 77°04′22″E
- Operator: Kerala State Electricity Board
- Commission date: 1967 (59 years ago)
- Turbines: 2 x 60 MW & 4 x 55 MW (Pelton-type)
- Installed capacity: 340 MW
- Annual generation: 1338 MU
- Website; Official website
- Spillway provided at Anathode Flanking Dam

Kakki Dam is a concrete gravity dam built on the Kakki river, a tributary of the Pampa river in the Ranni forest in the Seethathodu panchayat of Pathanamthitta district in Kerala, India. The dam is located in a forested area adjacent to the Periyar National Park. It was built in 1966 as part of the Sabarigiri Hydro Electric Project. The water sources of the dam are from the Pamba Dam and the Kakki river. The Sabarigiri project envisaged creation of two reservoirs which are Pamba and Kakki reservoirs and connecting these together to form a single source of water. The water from Pamba reservoir is connected to the Kakki reservoir through an underground tunnel of length 3.21 km. The intake of the Sabarigiri Powerhouse is from Kakki reservoir. The dam is 336 metres (1,102 ft) long and 116 metres (381 ft) high and is located at an elevation of 981.45 metres (3,220.0 ft) above sea level. The release flows through Ranni, Konni, Kozhencherry, Thiruvalla, Chengannur, Kuttanadu, Mavelikara and Karthikappally taluks before emptying into the Vembanad lake.

== Specifications ==
- Bed level : +874.78 m
- F. R. L. : +981.46 m
- M. W. L. : +982.16 m
- Top of dam, road level : +984.50 m
- Height of dam above river bed : 109.73 m
- Effective storage above elevation 908.30 m : 446.54 Mm3
- Catchment area at Kakki Dam site : 217.47 km^{2}
- Diversion catchment : 7.77 km^{2}
- Height from deepest foundation : 116.12 metres (381.0 ft)
- Length of dam at top 336.19 metres (1,103.0 ft)
- No. of outlets : 2 each controlled by 1.37 m diameter hollow jet valves
- Size and type of emergency gates for each outlet : 2.9 m x 1.52 m gates hydraulically operated from dam top using 10 T service hoist
- El. of sill of outlets : +896.11 m
- Max. computed combined discharge through two outlets under F. R. L. condition : 84.95 m 3 /s
- Width of roadway over top of dam : 3.66 m
- Size of elevator shaft : 2.16 m x 2.54 m
- No. of adits to foundation gallery : 3 nos. two on the right bank and one on the left bank
- No. of drift tunnels driven on the banks : 4 nos. two on each ban

== Flanking dam ==
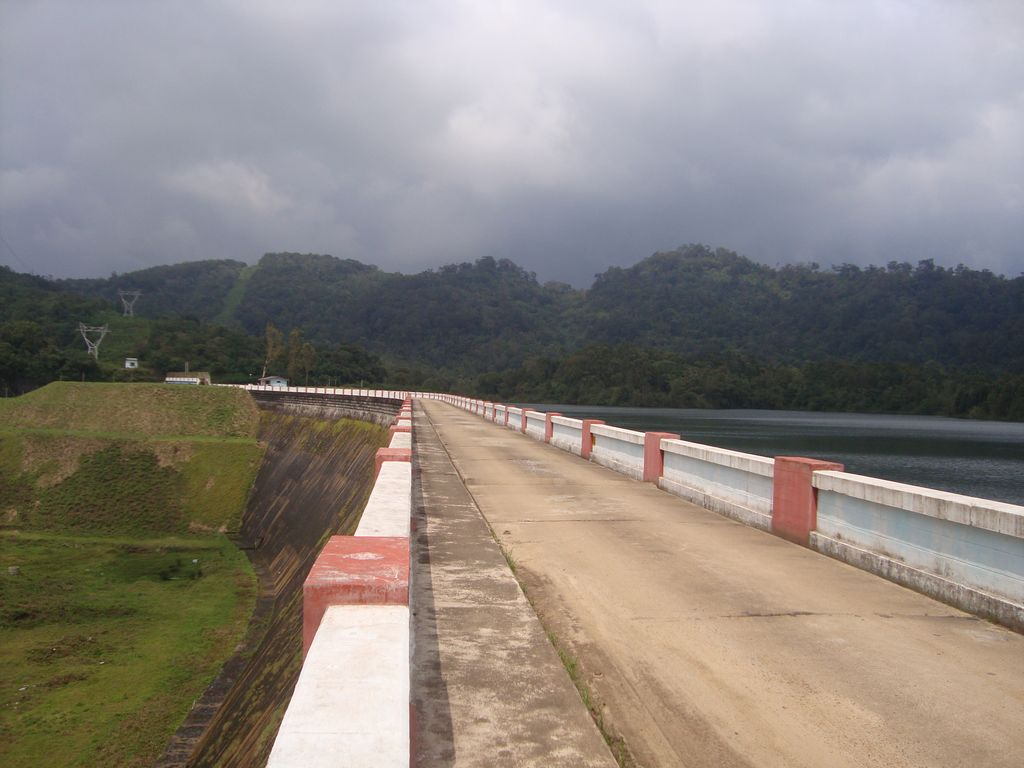
Anathode Dam

A flanking dam for the Kakki reservoir is located at Anathode, about 2.5 miles northeast of Kakki dam, where a low saddle existed. The flanking dam is built to increase the capacity of the Kakki reservoir and to host the spill way. The dam has a height of 170 feet above the foundation and a length of 1500 feet including the spill way. Spillways are 4 Numbers with radial gates of size 12.8 x 6.1 meters

== History ==
The Project plan was to create a reservoir by impounding Pampa River and another Reservoir by impounding Kakki River and connecting both the reservoirs by means of a tunnel to form a connected reservoir. Preliminary works and investigation was done in 1958 and the dam construction was started in 1960. Initial surveillance and mapping was completed in 1961. The housing colonies for the staff were built after the project was conceived. The work of Pamba Dam started in 1962. The Anathode dam was constructed along with Pamba Dam. The concrete Kakki Dam was finished in 1966. The tunnel to connect the two reservoirs was built and was lined by concrete. The power house was built with American aid. In April 1966 two generators were commissioned. It was inaugurated on 28 August 1967 by V. V. Giri then deputy president of India.

=== Construction history ===
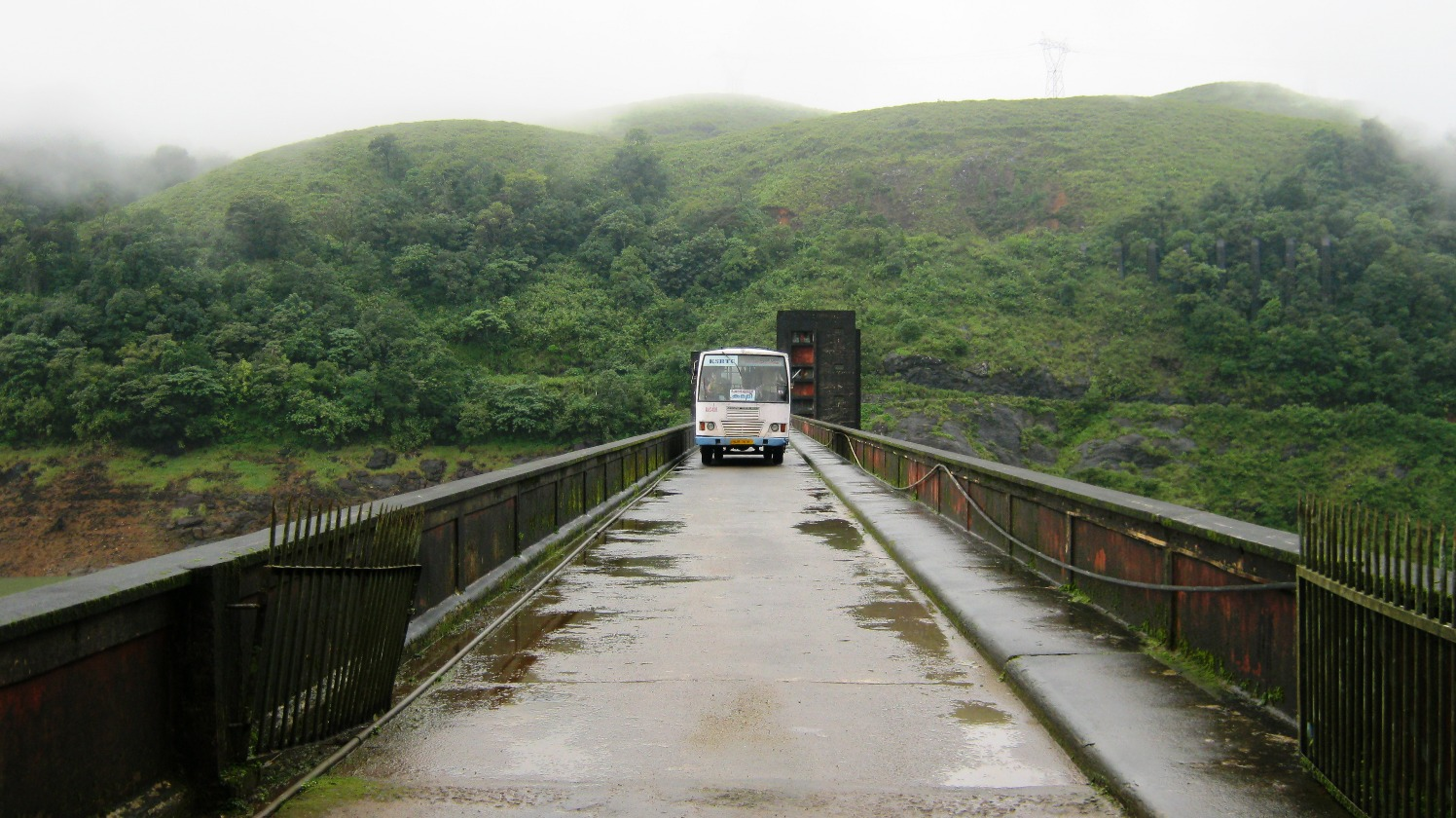
The dam is also used for transport

The whole work for the construction of Kakki dam was completely mechanised.

- Year of starting initial investigation: 1946
- Year of starting detailed investigation: 1960
- Year of starting detailed survey: 1961–62
- The original scheduled year of starting the work : 1961
- Year of starting the construction works : 1962
- Name of designing agency : Kerala State Electricity Board limited
- Name of contractor : M/s HCC Ltd., Bombay (Kakki), Sri. B M Edward, Cochin, Kerala (Anathodu)
- Date of completion of the work : 1966

=== Change in the nature of the dam ===
The original proposal was to construct an arch dam, but this was changed later to masonry straight dam. Tenders were invited in December 1961 and the contract was given to Hindustan Construction Company in Bombay in October 1962. The dam was scheduled to be completed by 1965 as per agreement but the works were completed only in 1966.

=== Major infrastructural work ===
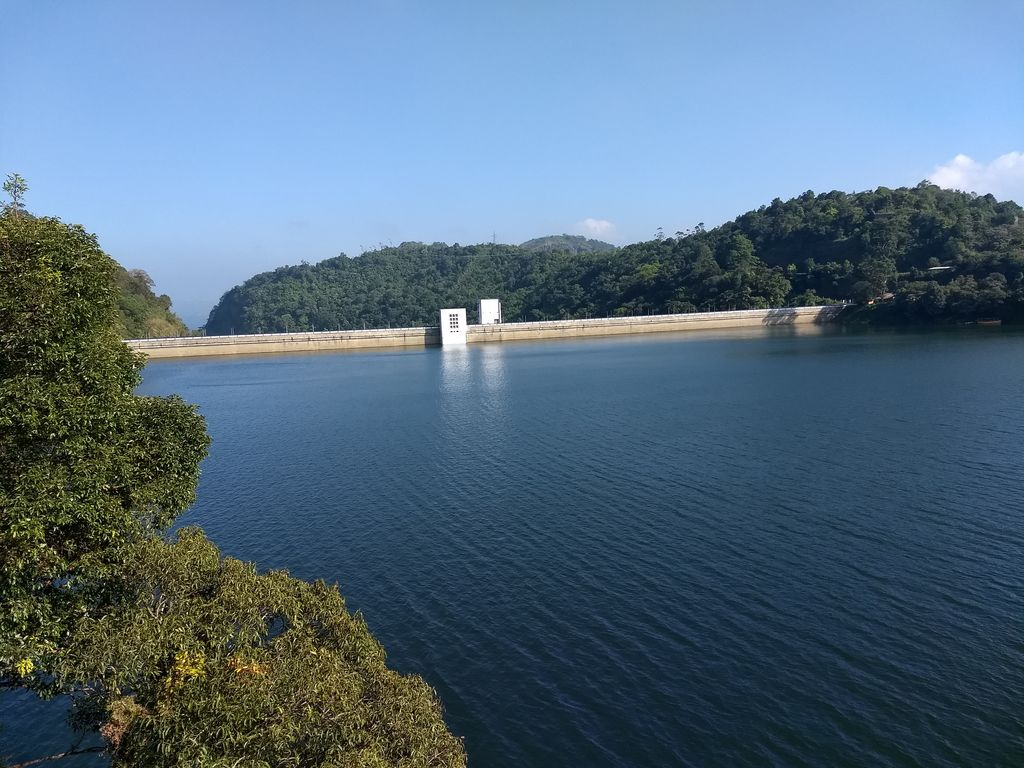
Kakki Dam and the reservoir

In 1954-56 a road was constructed from Vallakadavu to Kakki. It was modernised in 1961. In the same year a staff colony consisting of 250 houses was built at Anathodu. A contractors' colony consisting of 300 houses, was constructed by 1963. A provision store was opened at Anathode in 1962. The machineries of the contractors H.C.C. had to be transported from the a dam site in Uttar Pradesh where they had recently completed a dam construction.

=== Excavation and fault zone ===
The foundation excavation was started by HCC during 1961–62. Weak zones were found in actual excavation and were treated accordingly. The excavation work was completed by March 1964.

=== Concreting of the dam ===
In the original estimate the dam was to be made with rubble in cement, but later the dam was converted into completely cement. The concreting works of the Kakki Dam was started on 16 January 1964. Due to the deeper foundation and the height of the dam being increased by 10 feet and the quantity of concrete increased to 256 lakhs cubic feet (25,600,000 cubic feet (720,000 m^{3})). The height of the elevator also had to be increased in accordance with the new requirements.

=== During floods ===
During the monsoon seasons, discharging of water is needed, it is carried out by keeping Elevator no. 9 as a spilling block which required formation of a toe of the spilling blocks.

=== Gates and valves ===
The emergency gates and hollow jet valves were obtained from Pacific Cost Engineering Company in the US. The construction of the valve house was completed in 1965 and the installation of the emergency gate and hollow jet valves were completed by the end of September 1966.

=== Spillways ===
There are four spillways, which regulate flood discharge. The radial gates to separate hosting accessories were supplied by Pacific Coast Engineering Company, California. According to the agreement the contractor was in charge of the erection of the gates and it was to be done after the civil works, but due to some delay in the concreting of the hoist bridge, the installation work was carried out later with special arrangements.

=== Interconnecting tunnels ===
The Pamba and the Kakki reservoirs of the Sabarigiri hydroelectric project have been connected by an interconnecting tunnel which is 10,450 meters long and is lined with concrete. The face excavation was started in 1961 and took 3 months. The tunnelling was started in 1963 and was completed in 25 months.

== Reservoir ==
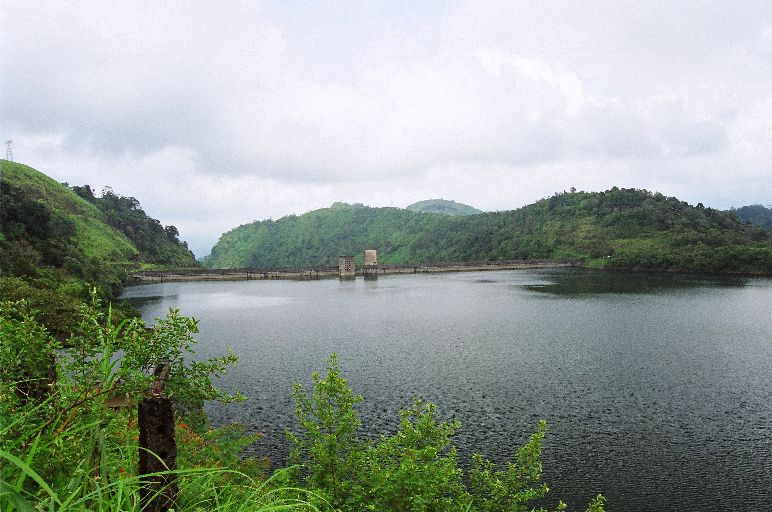
Kakki reservoir and the dam

Kakki reservoir was created when Kakki and its flanking dam, Anathode dams were built. Full reservoir level (FRL) is 981.45 meters above sea level. The reservoir, which is also a tourist spot, is in the Ranni reserve forest close to the Western Ghats.

Details of the reservoir.

- Water spread area : 17.6 Sq. km.
- Catchment area :225.51 Sq. km.
- Average rainfall: 4572 mm
- Full reservoir level (FRL):3220 Ft (Above MSL)
- Minimum Drawdown level (MDDL):3135 Ft (Above MSL)
- Effective storage at FRL:447.76 MCM
- Energy equivalent at FRL :722.2 MU
- Average head at power house :2499 ft

== Hydroelectric project ==
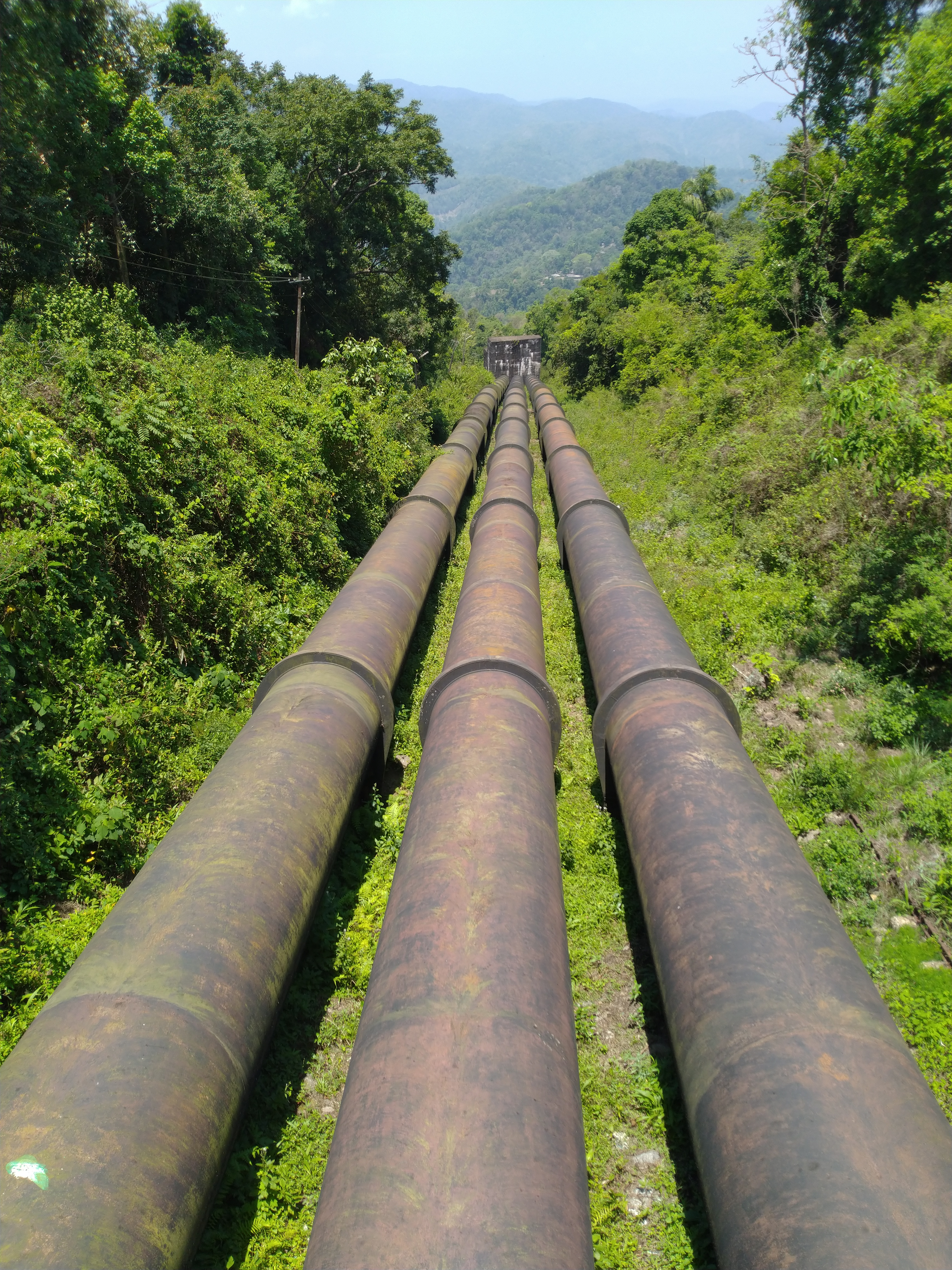
Penstock pipes from the dam leading to Sabarigiri Hydro Electric Power station

Sabarigiri Power Station was commissioned during 1966 -67 with six generators having vertical shaft pelton turbine as the prime mover. After power generation, water from the power station is released to the Moozhiyar reservoir. There are 114 employees in the project who works in three shifts.

=== The intake arrangement of the power tunnel ===
This is located on the left bank of the reservoir upstream of the Kakki Dam. It consists of 237 inch long shaft. The flow of water is regulated by a vertical lift gate. The arrangement is built on a hoist platform. Trash rack arrangements are also provided. A set of three high pressure surface penstocks about 2.611 km long each bifurcating just above the generating station from where 6 branches are taken to the power house.
