= Seethathodu =

Village in Kerala, India

- Village
- Location in Kerala, India Seethathodu (India)
- Coordinates: 9°19′30″N 76°58′0″E
- Country: India
- State: Kerala
- District: Pathanamthitta

Government
  - Type: Panchayati raj
  - Body: Seethathodu grama panchayat

Area
  - Total: 651.94 km^{2} (251.72 sq mi)

Population
  - Total: 18,222
  - Density: 28/km^{2} (73/sq mi)

Languages
  - Official: Malayalam
- Time zone: UTC+05:30 (IST)
- PIN: 689667
- Telephone code: 04735
- Vehicle registration: KL-83
- Nearest towns: Chittar, Angamoozhy, Konni
- Literacy: 98%
- Lok Sabha constituency: Konni
- Civic agency: Gram panchayat
- Panchayat President: P.R Pramod

Seethathodu is a village in the Konni taluk, Pathanamthitta district, state of Kerala, India, near Chittar Town. Predominantly, it is a rural region with agriculture being the most important sector. Both state-run and privately operated buses connect Seethathodu to various parts of Pathanamthitta district.

== Geography ==
Seethathodu is a scenic hilly rural region in the eastern side of Pathanamthitta district. Many mountains, valleys and steep slopes beautifies its geographical background. 90% of the area is dense reserve forest, a part of Goodrical Range, Periyar Tiger Reserve. The rest is populated, where the main cultivation is rubber. The main attraction of Seethathodu is Sabarimala, a Hindu hill pilgrim centre.

- Kakkad Hydro Electric Project Power Plant, India is located at Seethathode,(capacity of 50 MWe). It has 2 units. The first unit was commissioned in 1998 and the last in 1999. It is operated by Kerala State Electricity Board.
- Sabarigiri Hydro Electric Project - The second largest hydroelectric project in Kerala, Sabarigiri, is located in this village.
- It is one of the biggest panchayaths in Kerala with an area of about 651.94 km^{2}.But almost 602.7 km^{2} area is covered by dense forests. The habitable area is only about 4924 acres.

== History ==
The Koikkal rajas of Pandalam divided their kingdom into two parts as Valiyakoyikkal (including the parts of Pandalam) and Kochukoikkal (including the western parts) for administrative convenience. Kochukoikkal is today a part of Seethathodu panchayath. Advocate Kochukoikkal Thalachira Barayanan founded the first school (S.N.D.P school) in this region. Seethathodu panchayath was formed on 20 November 1968 and T.K Raghavan became the first president.

Joby T Easow is the president who played a decisive role in the development of Seethathodu. He was the president for only 555 days. During this time the construction of Seethathodu bus stand was started and completed. This was done during the Covid prevention.

The foundation stone of the shopping complex was laid and the old building was demolished before that

== Administration ==
Mrs Lekha Suresh is the current president of Seethathodu panchayath and Adv. Joby T Easow is the vice president. Communist, Congress and BJP parties have strong base here. The panchayath itself is self-sufficient in the case of basic infrastructures and the members of each ward are so concerned about the developmental activities.

=== Wards in Seethathodu panchayath ===
- Seethathodu
- Gavi
- Angamoozhy
- Kottamonpara
- Palathadiyar
- Valupara
- Kambiline
- Kochukoickal
- Kottakuzhi
- Gurunathanmannu
- Seethakuzhi
- Moonukallu
- Allungal

== Demographics ==
As of 2001 India census, Seethathodu panchayath has a population of about 18222 in which 9268 are males and 8954 are females. The village has literacy of 92.4%. More than 95% of the population speaks Malayalam and 4% speak Tamil. There are also some English and Hindi speakers. Hindi speakers are relatively new immigrant workers from North India.

== Educational institutions ==
=== Schools ===
- K.R.P.M H.S.S Seethathodu
- Sree Vidhyathi Raja English Medium School, Seethathode
- Govt. H. S. S., Chittar
- Govt. Model L. P. S., Chittar
- V. K. N. M. V. H. S. S, Vayyattupuzha
- Holy Family Public School, Chittar
- Komala Vilasm School, Padayanippara
- Little Angels English Medium School Chittar
- Royal Parallel College, Chittar
- Santhi Niketan Parallel College, Chittar
- Ideal Parallel College, Chittar
- Mountzion U.P.S (formerly Gurkulam U.P.S) Angamoozhy
- S.A.V.H.S Angamoozhy
- Cherupushpam Eng. Medium School Angamoozhy
- Govt.tribal UP School, Mundanpara
- M.M.A.M. English Medium School, Kochukoickal

=== Nearby Colleges ===
- Musaliar college of arts and science, Pathanamthitta
- Mar Ivanios ITC, Seethathodu
- SNDP College, Chittar
- SAS SNDP Yogam College, Konni
- NSS College, Konni
- Caarmel Engineering College, Ranni-Perunad
- Musalliar Engineering College, Malayalappuzha
- Mount Zion Engineering College, Kadammanitta
- Pushpagiri Medical College, Tiruvalla
- Muthoot Nursing College, Pathanamthitta
- St. Thomas College, Ranni
- Catholicate College, Pathanamthitta
- INE SME nursing college seethathode

=== health care ===
- Government PHC SEETHATHODU and ANGAMOOZHY
- MEDICURE hospital moonnukallu

== Transportation ==
- Airports :Thiruvananthapuram International Airport and Kochi's Cochin International Airport are at almost the same distance from Seethathodu (about a three-hour drive). The nearest airport, once completed, will be the upcoming Sabarimala Greenfield Airport.
- Railways : The nearest railway stations are Chengannur (60 km), and Thiruvalla (65 km).
- Roads : The main roads are Vadasserikara - Chittar - Angamoozhy - Plappally Road, Pathanamthitta - Angamoozhy - Kumily.
- Buses : All major long-route buses stop at Seethathodu Junction.
- Local Transport : Taxi's (Auto-rickshaws, Cars etc.) are available at every road and at all major junctions they have their slots. Smaller buses ply on regular intervals to the internal locations, as there are narrow roads.

== See also ==
- Plappally
- Nilakkal
- Angamoozhy
- Vayyattupuzha
- Gavi
