= Konni Forest Division =

Forest division in Kerala, India

Konni Forest Division Malayalam: കോന്നി വനം ഡിവിഷൻ
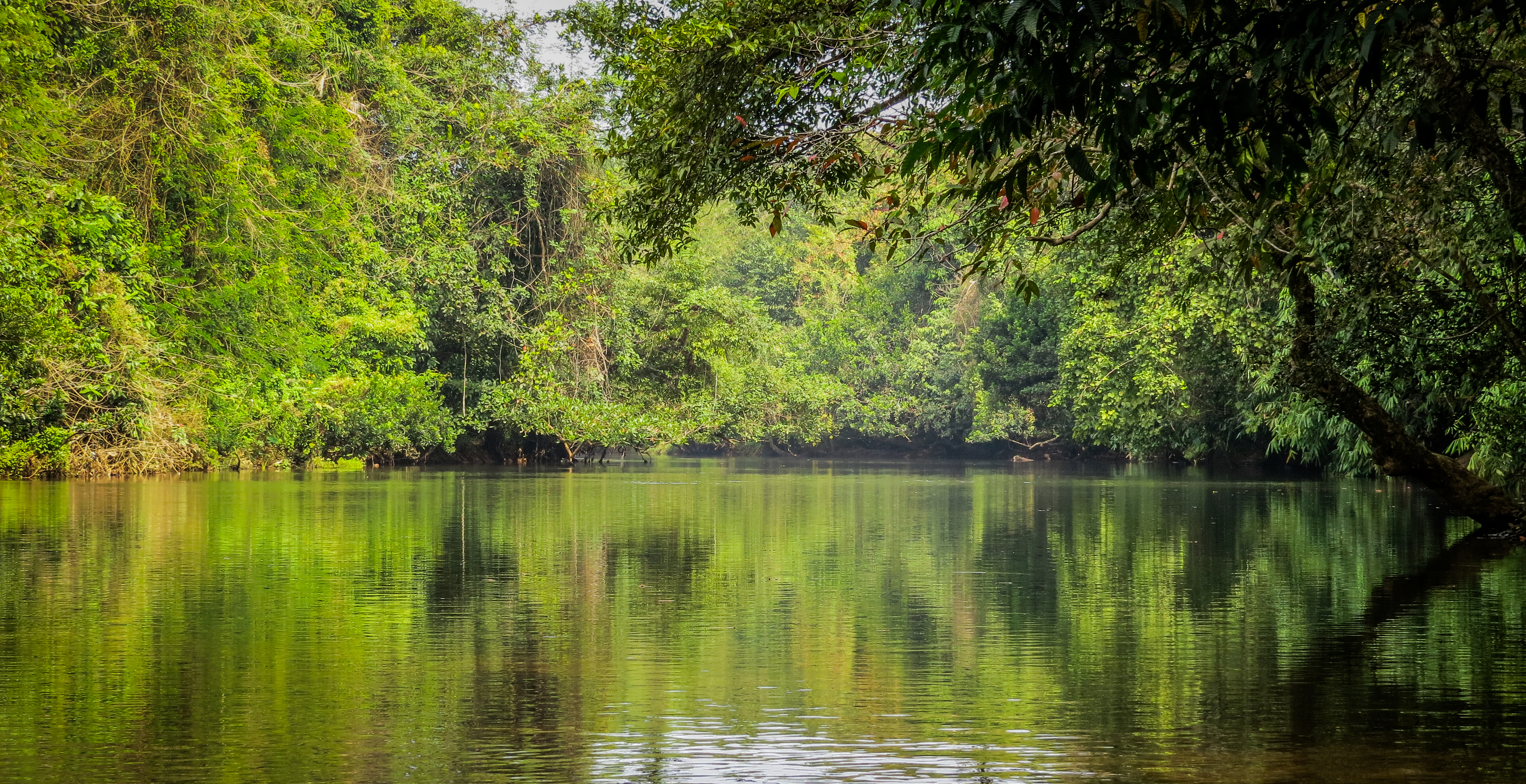
- Kallar river at Adavi, an eco-tourism destination under the Konni range of Konni Forest Division

- Location within Kerala Location within India
- Interactive map of Konni Forest Division

Geography
- Location: Kerala, India
- Coordinates: 9°13′50″N 76°51′07″E
- Elevation: Highest: 997 m (3,271 ft)
- Area: 331.66 km^{2} (128.05 sq mi)

Administration
- Status: Reserve forest
- Established: 9 October 1888
- Authority: Kerala Forest and Wildlife Department
- Website: forest.kerala.gov.in

Ecology
- Disturbance: Plantation, poaching

The Konni Forest Division is located in Kerala, India, and covers an area of about 331.66 square kilometres (128.05 sq mi). It is the first reserve forest in Kerala, which was declared on 9 October 1888 under the Travancore Forest Act of 1887. The division is part of the Western Ghats, which were designated as a UNESCO World Heritage Site in 1 July 2012. The forest area is a repository of many endemic species of the Western Ghats.

== Overview ==
It falls under Karunagappally, Kunnathur, and Pathanapuram taluks of Kollam district, and Adoor, Kozhencherry, and Konni taluks of Pathanamthitta district. Consisting of the Konni, Naduvathummoozhy and Mannarappara ranges, the division belongs to the southern circle of the Kerala Forest Department.

The division covers a total area of 331.655 km^{2} (128.053 sq mi), of which 320.553 km^{2} (123.766 sq mi) are reserved forest, 11.021 km^{2} (4.255 sq mi) are reserved land, and 0.081582 km^{2} (0.031499 sq mi) are government lands. With 8,294 ha (20,490 acres) of teak plantations, it has the largest teak plantation area in Kerala.

== Landscape ==
The main hills in the division are Chelikkalkar (997 m), Iruvallimala (817 m), Thunathumala (721 m) and Kodamala (598 m). Achankovil, Pamba Kallar and Achenkovil Kallar are the primary rivers that originate in the reserve forest.

== Climate ==
The temperature can vary from 21 °C (70 °F) in the rainy and winter seasons to 35 °C (95 °F) in the summer. The months of March and April are the hottest. Rainfall occurs from June to September or November.

== Boundaries ==
Map showing the forest divisions in Kerala

- North: Vadasserikkara and Ranni ranges of Ranni division
- South: Pathanapuram range of Punalur division
- East: Kallar and Achenkovil ranges of Achenkovil division
- West: Arabian sea

== Ranges and stations ==
In 1894, the forest was divided into ranges. The division consists of Konni, Mannarapara and Naduvathummoozhy ranges and eight stations. The Naduvathummoozhy range is the largest, with 138.93 km^{2} (53.64 sq mi), and the Konni range is the smallest, covering 62.73 km^{2} (24.22 sq mi). Konni serves as the division's main headquarters.

=== Ranges and stations under Konni Forest Division ===
Range	Area	Stations
Konni	62.73 km^{2} (24.22 sq mi)	North Kumaramperoor
Konni	62.73 km^{2} (24.22 sq mi)	South Kumaramperoor
Naduvathumoozhy	138.93 km^{2} (53.64 sq mi)	Kokkathodu
Naduvathumoozhy	138.93 km^{2} (53.64 sq mi)	Karippanthode
Naduvathumoozhy	138.93 km^{2} (53.64 sq mi)	Padom
Mannarapara	130.00 km^{2} (50.19 sq mi)	Chempala
Mannarapara	130.00 km^{2} (50.19 sq mi)	Mannarapara
Mannarapara	130.00 km^{2} (50.19 sq mi)	Pachakanam

== Types of forests ==
Konni forest division has tropical evergreen and semi-evergreen forests. The major forest types of Konni division are:

- West Coast Tropical Evergreen Forests
- West Coast Tropical Semi-Evergreen Forests
- Southern Moist Mixed Deciduous Forests
- Wet Reed Brakes
- Southern Montane Wet Grasslands

== Fauna ==
=== Mammals ===
About 29 species of mammals are found in the Konni division. These include tiger, leopard, leopard cat, elephant, gaur, wild boar, jungle cat, wild dog, jackal, common mongoose, stripe-necked mongoose, toddy cat, small Indian civet, barking deer, sambar deer, mouse deer, Indian pangolin, sloth bear, Nilgiri langur, gray langur, Travancore flying squirrel, Indian giant squirrel, Indian porcupine, Indian hare, Indian mole rat, bandicoot rat, bonnet macaque, slender loris and fulvous fruit bat.

=== Birds ===
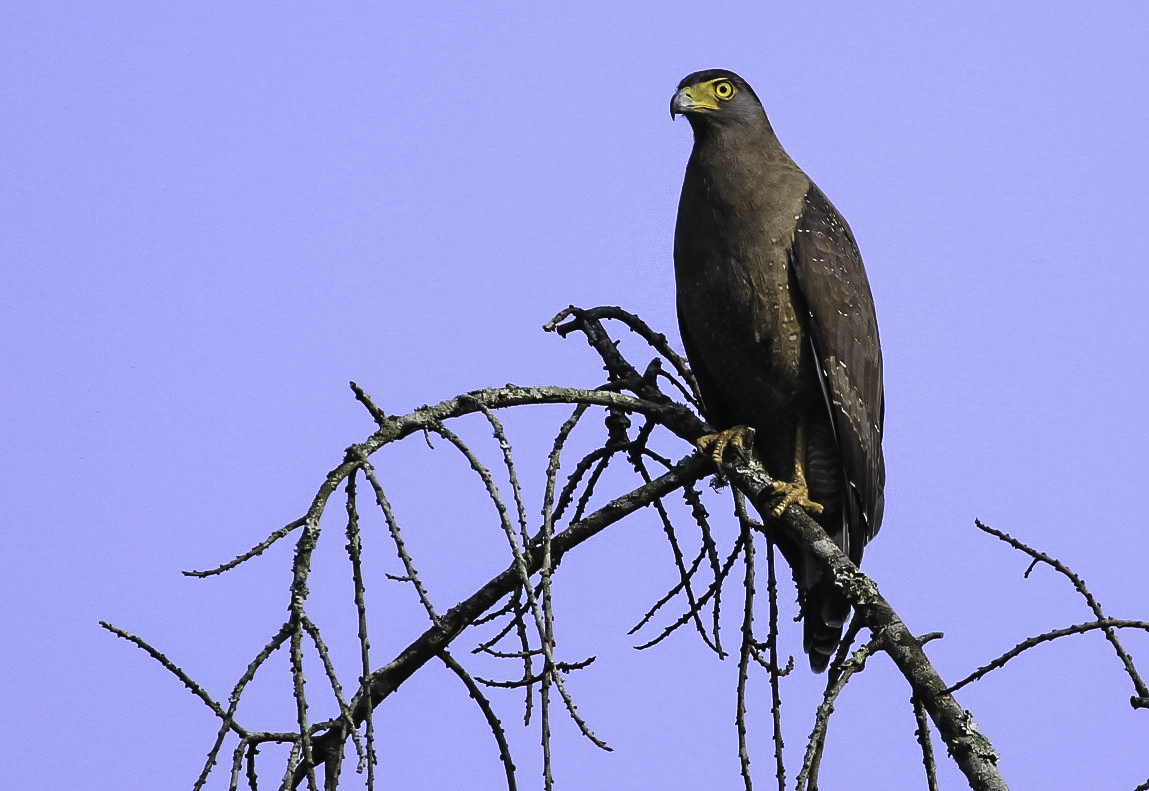
Crested serpent eagle photographed in the Konni forest range

Konni division is one of the IBAs (Important Bird Area) of India. About 133 species of birds were recorded from the division. Endemic birds of the western ghats such as Malabar grey hornbill, Nilgiri wood pigeon, white-bellied treepie and white-cheeked barbet are seen here. Although rare, great hornbills are also seen. Pariah kite, Brahminy kite, jungle myna, hill myna, crow pheasant, white-headed babbler, blue-winged parakeet, Indian lorikeet, spotted dove, emerald dove and mountain imperial pigeon are other species found here.

=== Reptiles ===
The important reptile species found here are monitor lizard, garden lizard, flying lizard, skink, cobra, king cobra, python, viper, krait, rat snake, tree snake and turtle.

== See also ==
- Wildlife of Kerala
