= Nilakkal =

- Pilgrimage centre
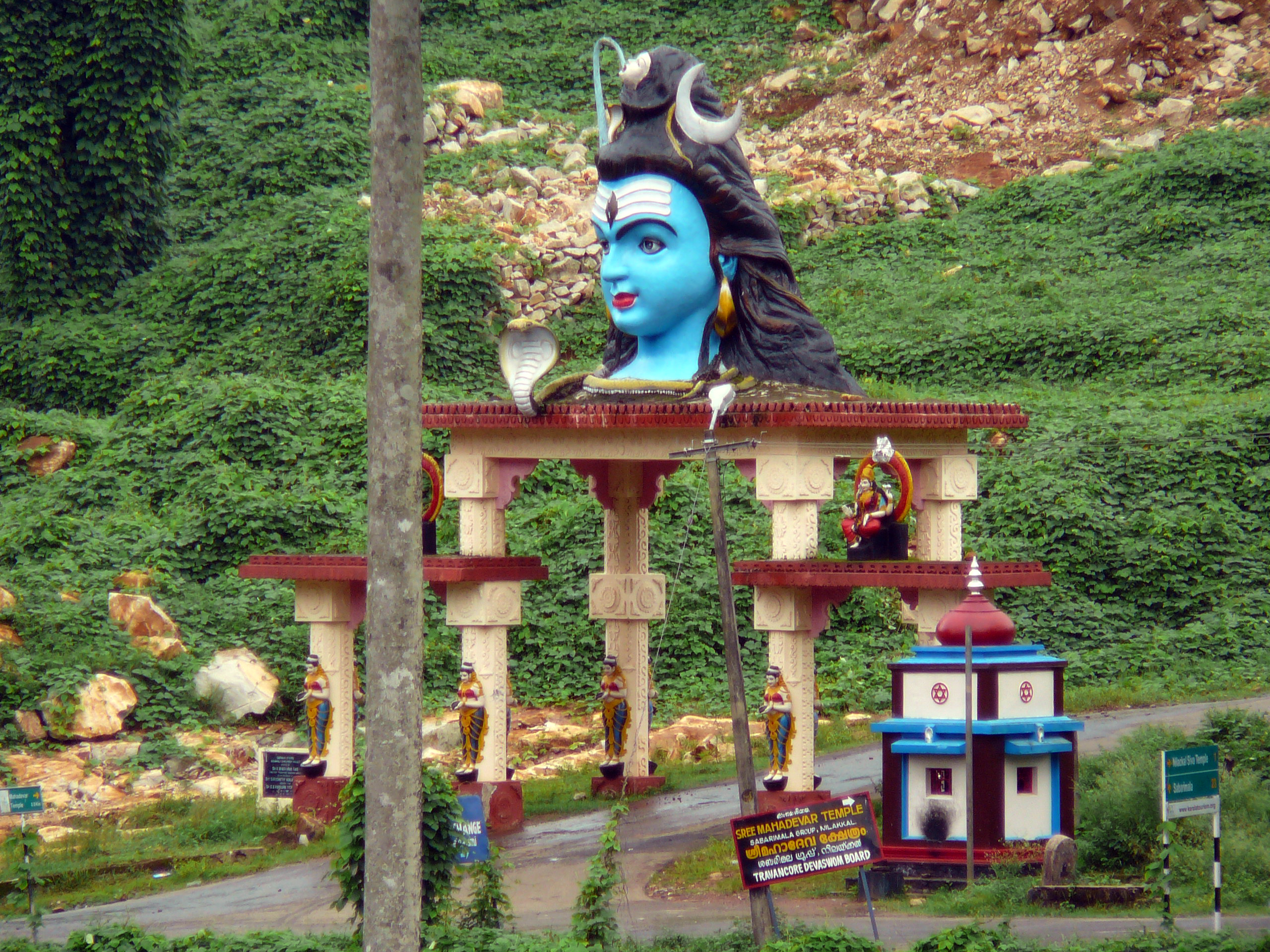
- Entrance arch to Nilakkal Mahadeva temple

- Location in Kerala, India Nilakkal (India)
- Coordinates: 9°22′49.43″N 76°59′52.6″E
- Country: India
- State: Kerala
- District: Pathanamthitta

Government
  - Type: Panchayath
  - Body: Perunad grama panchayat
- Elevation: 333 m (1,093 ft)

Languages
  - Official: Malayalam, English
- Time zone: UTC+5:30 (IST)
- PIN: 689662
- Area code: 04735
- ISO 3166 code: IN-KL
- Vehicle registration: KL-83 (konni); KL-03 (Pathanamthitta)
- Coastline: 0 kilometres (0 mi)
- Lok Sabha constituency: Pathanamthitta
- Assembly constituency: Ranni
- Climate: Tropical monsoon (Köppen)
- Nearest Airport: Cochin International Airport Limited

Nilakkal, also spelled Nilackal, is an important base camp of Sabarimala Hindu pilgrims located in Ranni tehsil, in Thiruvalla Revenue Division of Pathanamthitta district in the Indian state of Kerala. Sabarimala temple is located at a distance of 23 km (14 mi) from Nilakkal.

== Etymology ==
According to some historical records, the name Nilakkal is associated with Nilavaaya, considered to be the presiding deity of old Shasta temple (present Sabarimala) at the forest interiors. While some other records has it that the name Nilakkal came from "Nilakkal thavalam". The place's alternate name Chayal denotes a place sloping towards Pamba River. But in another context, Chayal is referred to someone who is left alone.

== History ==
The historical background of Nilakkal was based on its geographical position which date backs to the ancient times. Kerala had age-long trade relations with Pandiyas and Cholas through a trade route passed through Nilakkal. It was a well established populous trade center during the first century AD, primarily exporting spices such as cinnamon, ginger, pepper and forest products like timber and ivory. The place at that time was commonly known as Nilakkal thavalam and it was connected to ports like Muziris (present Kodungalloor) and Purakkad. Merchants who traveled with their trade items had a sojourn at the thavalam. In the later stages, the region came under the possession of Vel kings of Ay kingdom (later became Venad).

== Religion ==
=== Places of Hindu worship ===
==== Sree Mahadeva temple ====
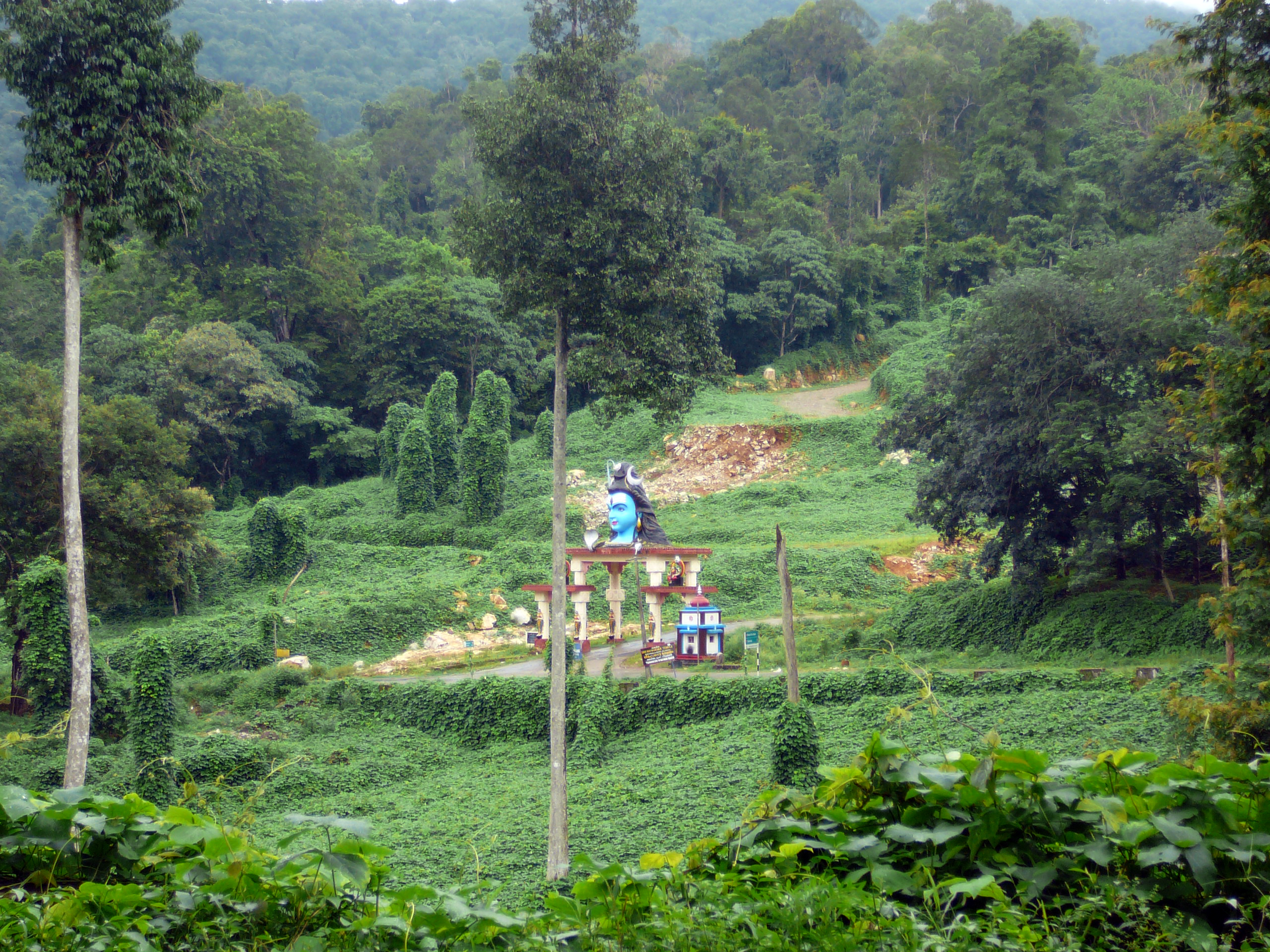
The temple arch gate is an important landmark of the place

The old shrine at Nilakkal is currently administered by Travancore devaswom board (TDB). During Sabarimala pilgrimage, many pilgrims visit the temple to have a sojourn and worship. On this occasion, Nilakkal will be crowded by a large number of pilgrims. The temple was built in 1946. It is located just 1 km from the main highway that leads to Sabarimala. Lord Shiva is the presiding deity and he is believed to be in two moods, Ugramoorthy (fierce) and Mangala pradayakan (auspicious). A common belief is that Lord Shiva is showering his blessings to his son Lord Ayyappa to fight against all evil spirits while throwing all anger to the evils. There are only two Upa Prathishtas (sub-deities) here, Lord Kannimoola Ganapathi and Nandi. Three Poojas are held here daily. Special weekly days are Sunday, Monday and Friday. The Maha Shivaratri held annually is one of the noted festivals of the temple.

==== Palliyarakkavu Devi temple ====
It is situated near the Shiva temple. Devi presides here, who is considered as the Mother of Lord Ayyappa. Pilgrims make offerings to Devi for welfare and sake. The Irumudi kettu nirakkal (a ritual related to Sabarimala pilgrimage) is performed here by the pilgrims after the Nayattu vili (a narrative song). Three poojas are held every day. Aravana payasam is the main offering to Devi.

==== Sabarimala ====
The famous Hindu pilgrim destination, Sabarimala is only at a distance of 23 km from here. Nilakkal is an unavoidable place during the times of pilgrimages. All the vehicles to Sabarimala passes through Nilakkal which is on the state highway 67.

=== Christianity ===
==== St. Thomas ecumenical church ====
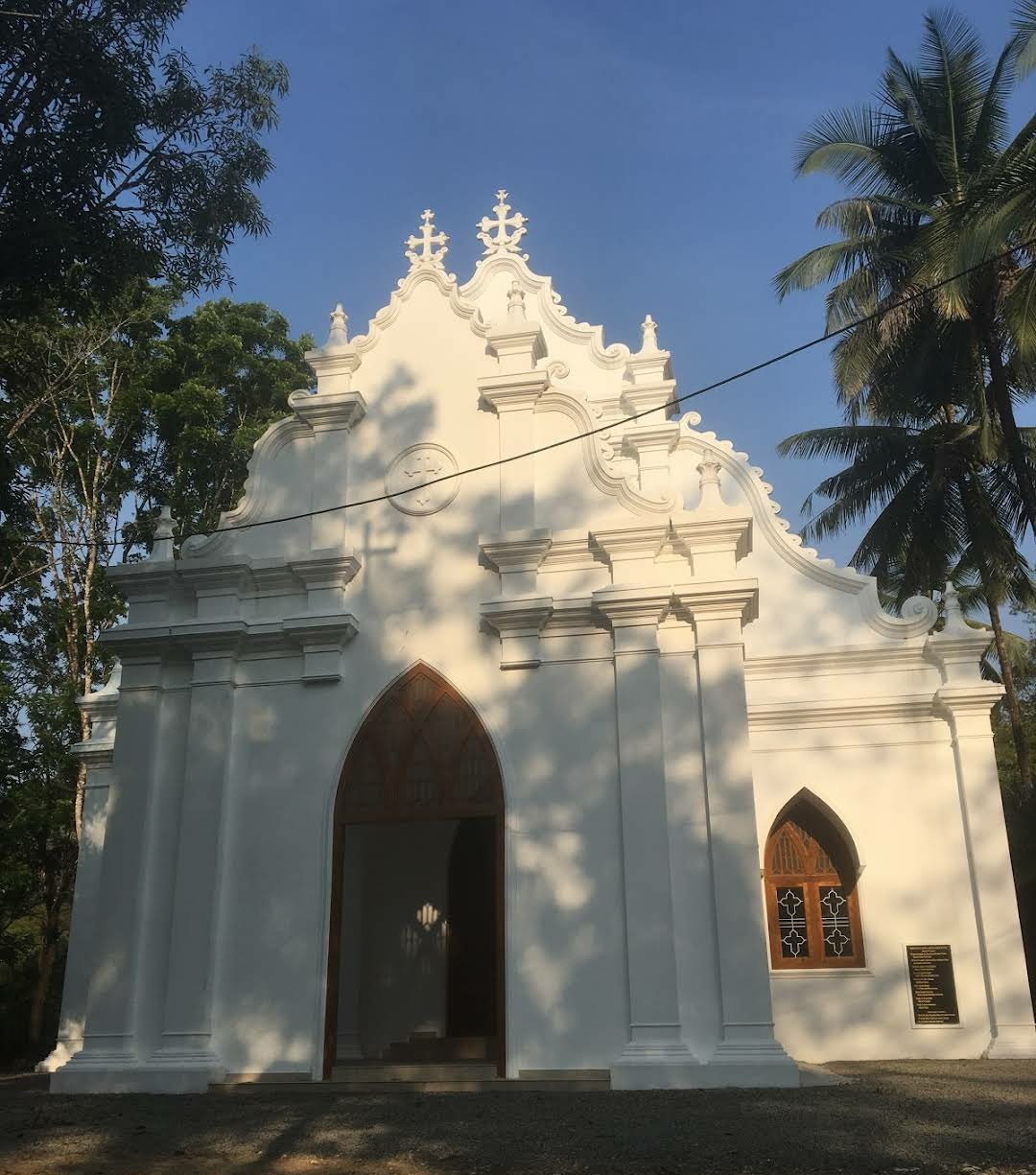
Nilakkal (Chayal) Mar Thoma Sleeha Suriyanipally

- Nilackal St Thomas Ecumenical Syrian Church – The Nilackal (Chayal) Church in Angamoozhy was established by Thomas the Apostle in 54 AD and is among the Ezharappallikal. The Syrian Christians of Nilakkal had migrated to nearby regions of Kadampanad, Adoor, Thumpamon and Chengannur between the 2nd and the 8th centuries. According to tradition many Tamil Brahmins, Vellalars and Chettiars were converted by St Thomas the apostle in the Coromandel coast (Mylapore, Kayalpattanam). These converts from Coromandel later flocked towards the Syrian Christian strongholds in Kerala like Nilakkal(Chayal) and Kollam in the 2nd century following persecution. Nilakkal was an important trading city in the erstwhile Chera Kingdom and had flourishing trade with the Pandya Kingdom of Madurai. In the 10th century Pandalam and Poonjar dynasties branched off from the Pandyan Kingdom and established themselves in Kerala, Nilakkal being part of Pandalam. The decline of Nilackal initiated in the early 12th century when Maravarman Kulasekara Pandyan I conquered Quilon, as Nilackal was the passage between Chera-Pandya it was sacked. This influenced Pandyan bandits and plunderers led by Vikramanpuli Thevar (Vakrapuli) and Paraiya pattam (Perumpatta) to loot Nilackal early in the 12th century. The 2nd Pandyan Civil War between Veera Pandya and Sundara Pandya along with invasion of the Delhi Sultanate led General Malik Kafur in the early 1300s further aggravated the misery of Nilakkal. The city was looted and torched and nothing remained of it. The Nilakkal church was burned and the Syrian Christians of Nilakkal migrated to regions like Kanjirappally, Poonjar, Aruvithura, Ranni, Vadasserikara, Vaipur and Erumeli and other parts of present Meenachil. The Great Flood Of 1341 destroyed what was left of Nilakkal, completely wiping out its existence.

The Nilackal church was later reconstructed in Angamoozhy. This church has the importance that it is the first Ecumenical church in the world and has been dedicated by all the denominations as an example of heritage by St. Thomas.

==== Catholic titular see ====
The Nazrani diocese was nominally restored in 1977 as Syro-Malankara Catholic Church (Eastern Catholic, an Antiochian Rite) Titular bishopric of Chayal (Italian) / Chaialum / Chaialen(sis) (Latin), of the lowest (Episcopal) rank. It had the following incumbents :

- Paulos Philoxinos Ayyamkulangara (1977.10.11 – death 1998.11.03), as Auxiliary Bishop of the Metropolitanate Trivandrum of the Syro-Malankars (India) (1977.10.11 – 1998.11.03)
- Baselios Cleemis Thottunkal (2001.06.18 – 2003.09.11) as Auxiliary Bishop of above Trivandrum of the Syro-Malankars (India) (2001.06.18 – 2003.09.11), Apostolic Visitator in North America of the Syro-Malankars (2001.06.18 – 2003.09.11) and Apostolic Visitator in Europe of the Syro-Malankars (2001.06.18 – 2003.09.11); later last suffragan Eparch (Bishop) of Tiruvalla of the Syro-Malankars (India) (2003.09.11 – 2006.05.15), (see) promoted Metropolitan Archbishop of Tiruvalla of the Syro-Malankars (India) (2006.05.15 – 2007.02.10), Major Archbishop of Trivandrum of the Syro-Malankars (India) ([2007.02.08] 2007.02.10 – ...), President of Synod of the Syro-Malankarese Church (2007.02.10 – ...), Second Vice-president of Catholic Bishops’ Conference of India (2008.02.19 – 2010.03.01), vice-president of Catholic Bishops’ Conference of India (2010.03.01 – 2014.02.12), Cardinal-Priest of S. Gregorio VII (2012.11.24 [2013.05.19] – ...), President of Catholic Bishops’ Conference of India (2014.02.12 – ...)
- Gheevarghese Mar Aphrem Kurismoottil (1961- ...) as Auxiliary Bishop for the Syro -Antiochene faithful of the Archeparchy of Kottayam (29-08-2020 - ...)

==== The Orthodox diocese of Nilakkal ====
Nilakkal diocese was formed on 15 August 2010, by the order issued by H.H Baselios Mar Thoma Didymos I, the Catholicos cum Malankara Metropolitan. The first metropolitan of the diocese is H.G.Dr Joshua Mar Nicodimos. This newly formed diocese, comprising Kottayam and Pathanamthitta districts, has 39 parishes including almost 2953 families. These parishes are organised into five ecclesiastical districts : Ayroor, Vayalathala, Ranni, Nilakkal and Kanakappaalam. The diocese has its headquarters at Ranni, named St. Thomas aramana, and also engages in charitable activities such as helping the poor and needy in and around the diocese.

== Places of interest ==
Attathodu Tribal Colony: A remote tribal settlement is situated near Nilakkal named Attathodu, on the banks of river Pamba. Majority of the tribals here belongs to Malapandaram (hill pandaram) community, commonly seen in the sacred forests of Sabarimala. People here engages in small scale agriculture and relays on the forest products.

Kakki Reservoir: Kakki reservoir is located 45 km east to Nilakkal. This dam was built as a part of Sabarigiri hydro-electric project, the second largest hydro-electric project in Kerala. This dam is situated very close to the Western Ghats and also it is a tourist spot.

Periyar Tiger Reserve: Periyar tiger reserve lies in northern part of Nilakkal. It spreads over an area of about 925 km^{2} and is one of the 48 tiger reserves in India.

== Agriculture ==
Rubber is cultivated in the gentle undulating lands and in plains with favorable geographical settings making its cultivation easier. As part of improving the parking facilities, a number of years tapped rubber trees were cut out. Sabari estate of Farming corporation is an important estate here. The land available for cultivation around Nilakkal is comparatively less hence most parts are covered by dense reserve forests. But the historical records points out that Nilakkal in ancient times was an important commercial center exporting several spices and forest products like timber and ivory. Later, it was covered by thick forests.

== Geography ==
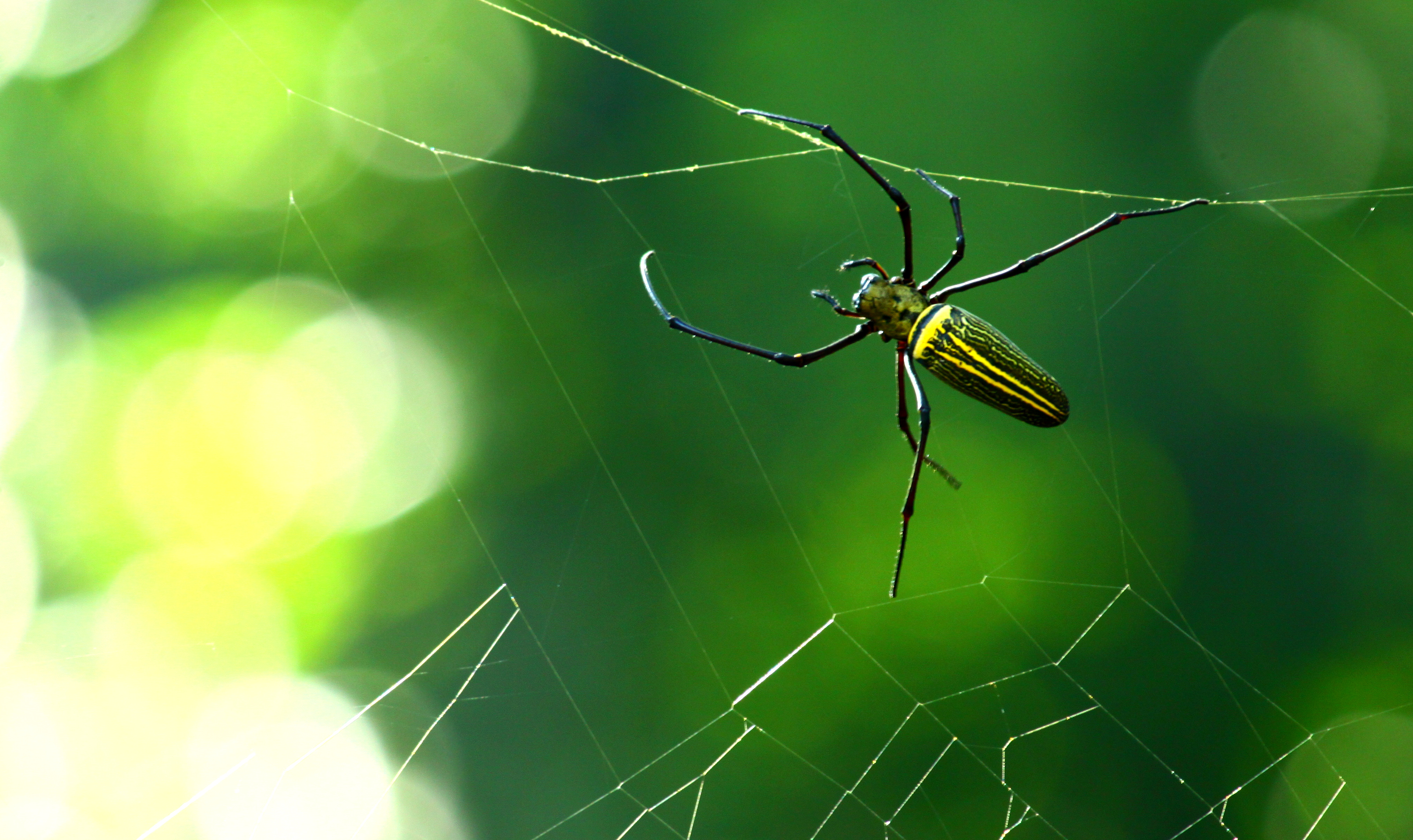
Photograph of a Spider from the forest interiors

Predominately it is a remote hilly area classified as Malanad (geographic division of Kerala) totally surrounded by dense reserve forests and small scale rubber plantations. Geographic coordinates of the place is 9°22′49.43″N 76°59′52.6″E. The region has an altitude ranging from 330 m (1,080 ft) above mean sea level. A sizeable portion is covered by thick reserve forests of Western Ghats mountain ranges and rubber plantations. The holy river Pamba, flows westward through the northern part of Nilakkal and finally merges with Vembanadu Lake.

=== Location ===
Nilakkal lies in the eastern part of Pathanamthitta district and west to Sabarimala near the Western Ghats forests. It is located on the main trunk road leading to Sabarimala temple. Pathanamthitta town is about 42 km (26 mi) and Kottayam about 78 km (48 mi). Chittar (27 km) and Angamoozhy (7 km) are the nearby townships.

=== Nearby places ===
- Angamoozhy
- Plappally
- Attathodu
- Chalakkayam
- Elavumkal
- Aryattukavala
- Rajampara
- Seethathodu
- Chittar
- Thulappally
- Naranamthodu

=== Climate ===
Seasonal rainfall at Nilakkal
| Year | Southeast monsoon | Northwest monsoon |
|---|---|---|
| 2001 | 1,200 mm (47 in) | 500 mm (20 in) |
| 2002 | 1,300 mm (51 in) | 700 mm (28 in) |
| 2003 | 1,400 mm (55 in) | 500 mm (20 in) |
| 2004 | 1,500 mm (59 in) | 400 mm (16 in) |
| 2005 | 2,400 mm (94 in) | 1,000 mm (39 in) |
| 2006 | 2,000 mm (79 in) | 1,000 mm (39 in) |
| 2007 | 2,800 mm (110 in) | 700 mm (28 in) |
| 2008 | 1,800 mm (71 in) | 500 mm (20 in) |
| 2009 | 1,500 mm (59 in) | 700 mm (28 in) |
| 2010 | 2,500 mm (98 in) | 1,000 mm (39 in) |
| 2011 | 3,000 mm (120 in) | 600 mm (24 in) |
| 2012 | 1,700 mm (67 in) | 400 mm (16 in) |

Nilakkal's climate is classified under Köppen climate classification. It is also one of the five upstream rain gauge stations of Pamba River basin which receives a significant rainfall of over 3,000 mm (120 in) during the South-West Monsoon of last few years. But the amount of precipitation is comparatively low during the North-East Monsoon, Pre-Monsoon and Non-Monsoon period, with only 1,000 mm (39 in) of precipitation. The minimum annual rainfall recorded here is 2,391.6 mm (94.16 in) and a maximum of 4,617.1 mm (181.78 in), which is about 30% above the state average.

Sufficient amount of rainfall is received during the months of June, July, August and September. Although Humidity increases during the months of March and April, a pleasant climate is normally experienced. The best weather is normally from October to February. Winter begins from the month of December to mid-February. Since Nilakkal and its surroundings are in the middle of thick forests, locally developed thundershowers are common here.

== Infrastructure ==
=== Nilakkal base camp ===
Nilakkal developed into a main base camp of Sabarimala pilgrimage and achieved huge progress by the initiation of Sabarimala master plan by Travancore Devaswom Board. In 2005, the Government gave 110 hectares (270 acres) of land to Devaswom board to improve the basic infrastructures and parking facilities for pilgrims at Nilakkal. Previously, the land was under the possession of the Government-owned State Farming Corporation since 1982. Before 1982, the area was used for cultivating sugarcane by the co-operative Mannam Sugar Mills, Pandalam. The land occupied from Farming corporation was mostly utilized for improving parking facilities.

At times of Sabarimala pilgrimage, heavy and medium vehicles drops pilgrims at Pamba and parks at Nilakkal in order to avoid the rush at Pamba. The parking grounds at Nilakkal could accommodate more than 4000 vehicles at one time. The parking has been divided into various sectors for the convenience of pilgrims from various states. Recently, Devaswom board also improved the drinking water and sanitation facilities at the camp. A nadapanthal (shed) is constructed in front of the Mahadeva temple for the pilgrims. The base camp also have a police station, Government primary health centre, KSRTC bus stand and accommodation facilities for the pilgrims.

=== Health and education ===
The nearest medical centre to Nilakkal is the Government Primary Health Centre started on 19 January 2014, by Dr.Prasob Enose, which functions throughout the year, benefiting tribal families in Attathodu colony.

==== Nearby hospitals ====
- Govt. primary Health Centre, Angamoozhy
- Govt. Ayurveda Hospital, Thulappally
- Govt. Hospital, Pamba
- Athura Hospital, Seethathodu

==== Educational institutions ====
- Government Tribal H.S.S, Kissumam
- S.A.V.H.S, Angamoozhy
- Government Tribal L.P School, Attathodu
- K.R.P.M Higher Secondary School, Seethathodu
- Govt. Higher Decondary School, Chittar
- V. K. N. M Vocational Higher Secondary School, Vayyattupuzha

=== Transportation ===
==== Road ====
Nilakkal lies on the Mannarakkulanji - Chalakkayam state highway (SH-67). The Adoor - Vandiperiyar highway passes through Plappally, 8 km (5.0 mi) west to Nilakkal. During Sabarimala pilgrimage, state-owned K.S.R.T.C buses provides chain services from Pamba to Nilakkal for the pilgrims. Private busses only operates through nearby places like Angamoozhy and Thulappally. Still transportation is comparatively less in the region.

==== Railway ====
The nearest railway stations are Chengannur (68 km) and Thiruvalla (73 km).

==== Airport ====
Cochin International Airport (136 km) and Thiruvananthapuram international airport (156 km) are the nearest airports to Nilakkal. There is also a heliport at Perunad, near Nilakkal, which operates at times of Sabarimala pilgrimage. A helipad is constructed at Nilakkal base camp as part of the disaster management and to deal with emergency situations.

== See also ==
- Sabarimala
- Pathanamthitta district
- Nilakkal Sree Mahadeva Temple
