= Thulappally =

- village
- Location in India, Kerala Thulappally (Kerala)
- Coordinates: 9°24′49.43″N 76°57′40.41″E
- Country: India
- State: Kerala
- District: Pathanamthitta

Government
  - Type: Panchayath
  - Body: Ranni-Perunad panchayath
- Elevation: 117 m (384 ft)

Languages
  - Official: Malayalam, English
- Time zone: UTC+5:30 (IST)
- PIN: 686510
- Area code: 04735
- Vehicle registration: KL-62 (Ranni), KL-34 (Kanjirappally)
- Coastline: 0 kilometres (0 mi)
- Nearest city: Erumely, Mukkoottuthara, Koruthodu
- Lok Sabha constituency: Pathanamthitta
- Assembly constituency: Ranni
- Climate: Tropical monsoon (Köppen)
- Avg. summer temperature: 31.13 °C (88.03 °F)
- Avg. winter temperature: 23.92 °C (75.06 °F)
- Nearest airport: Cochin International Airport Limited

Thulappally is a small village in Perunad panchayath of Ranni tehsil,Thiruvalla Revenue Division in Pathanamthitta district of Kerala state, India.

== Etymology ==
It is believed that in ancient times there were many small churches in the forest regions including Nilakkal and Thulappally as a result by the visit of St. Thomas in 52 AD. Places like Thulappally and Plappally in the forest were named after these churches. The head church of all these churches were known as Thalappally (Thala means head and pally means church) and which in course of time became "Thulappally".

== Geography ==
Basically Thulappally is classified as Malanad (geographic division of Kerala) or high land with an altitude ranging from 117 m (384 ft) above mean sea level. The place is located near to the sacred forest regions (Poongavanam) of Sabarimala with comparatively less population. River Pamba flows westwards through the northern part of Thulappally.

== Pilgrim centers ==
=== Hindu temple ===
Vaikundapuram Sri Krishna Swami Temple, a Hindu shrine located on the banks of Pamba River with Lord Krishna as the principal deity is the main temple at Thulappally. The annual festival is hosted from 10 May.

=== Church ===
St. Thomas Mar Thoma Syrian Church, this is one of the oldest church in the area which belongs to the Syrian Christians. The church is established in the name of Mar Thoma Sleeha, to show as the reference to the Saint and the heritage of the church.

Mar Thoma Sleeha Syro-Malabar Catholic Church, a newly built church of the Catholics, where the old church was dedicated in the name of St George. This is a pilgrimage church located here under the Syro-Malabar Catholic Eparchy of Kanjirappally.

Sharon Fellowship Church, Thulappally is a Pentecostal Church.

- India Pentecostal Church of God, Thulappally
- Assemblies of God in India, Thulappally

=== Masjid ===
Hidhaythul Islam Juma Masjid, a Muslim Masjid located at Aithalappally on the way to Moolakkayam which is 1KM away from Thulappally Town.

== Economy ==
Majority of people depends upon the agricultural sector. Rubber is being cultivated widely and many rubber plantations are widespread in the populated regions. The hilly terrains here are suitable for its cultivation. Moreover, pepper, banana etc., are also cultivated. Many people works in abroad as well as in urban areas. The 'Malanadu development society' under Kanjirappally diocese has a rural electrification system named "Malanadu Mycro Hydel Power Project" (MHPP) at Thulappally. This small scale power project generates electricity from water bodies and supplies to about 250 families, shops and pilgrim centers.

== Climate ==
Climate data for Thulappally, Kerala
Month	Jan	Feb	Mar	Apr	May	Jun	Jul	Aug	Sep	Oct	Nov	Dec	Year
Mean daily maximum °C (°F)	30.6 (87.1)	31.7 (89.1)	33.1 (91.6)	33.2 (91.8)	32.8 (91.0)	30.8 (87.4)	30.1 (86.2)	30.3 (86.5)	30.7 (87.3)	30.3 (86.5)	29.8 (85.6)	30.1 (86.2)	31.1 (88.0)
Mean daily minimum °C (°F)	21.7 (71.1)	22.6 (72.7)	29.0 (84.2)	25.0 (77.0)	25.1 (77.2)	24.1 (75.4)	23.6 (74.5)	23.7 (74.7)	23.7 (74.7)	23.4 (74.1)	23.0 (73.4)	22.1 (71.8)	23.9 (75.1)
Average precipitation mm (inches)	23 (0.9)	39 (1.5)	69 (2.7)	150 (5.9)	212 (8.3)	362 (14.3)	378 (14.9)	260 (10.2)	202 (8.0)	302 (11.9)	210 (8.3)	65 (2.6)	2,272 (89.5)
Source: Climate-Data.org

A tropical climate is normally experienced here. The place receives significant rainfalls during the monsoon, with a short dry season. The average annual temperature rises to 27.3 °C. The months of June, July and August receives sufficient amount of rainfall, while the temperature falls to 21.7 °C in the month of January. Humidity normally increases in the months of March and April. The presence of thick forests helps to develop local thundershowers.

=== Nearby schools and colleges ===
- Government Tribal HSS, Kissumam
- ST. George's LPS, Thulappally
- ST. Mary's School, Anglevalley
- San Thome HSS, Kanamala
- Caarmel College of Engineering, Koonamkara, Perunad
- Muslim Educational Society (MES) College, Erumely
- Sree Narayana Arts and Science College, Chittar

=== Nearby hospitals ===
- Government Ayurveda Hospital, Thulappally
- St. Thomas Hospital, Thulappally
- Assisi Hospital, Mukkoottuthara
- Government Primary Health Centre, Nilakkal
- Govt P.H.C Chithanya Hospital, Angamoozhy

== Transport facilities ==
There are well connected state highways and rural roads which makes transportation more flexible. Neriyamangalam - Pamba state highway (SH-44), one among the important roads to Sabarimala passes through Thulappally. Both state-owned (KSRTC) and privately operated buses provides service to Thulappally from places like Kottayam, Erumely and Kanjirappally. At times of Sabarimala pilgrimage (Mandala-Makaravilakku), thousands of vehicles passes through the place. In the past, the regions including Thulappally was not so easily accessible due to the absence of quality roads. But the transportation facilities improved when the Kanamala- Elavumkal highway was inaugurated.

=== Airports ===
Cochin International Airport is at distance of 125 km (78 mi) from here and Thiruvananthapuram international airport about 147 km (91 mi). A heliport is situated in Perunad which operates at times of Sabarimala pilgrimage.

=== Railways ===
Chengannur (59 km) Thiruvalla (63 km), Kottayam (65 km) and Changanassery (61 km) are the nearby railway stations.

== Nearby places ==
- Kanamala
- Plappally
- Angel Valley
- Vattappara
- Moolakkayam
- Anglevalley
- Naranamthodu
- Nellimala
- Mandhiram Padi
- Aarattukayam
- Aithalappady

== See also ==
- Nilakkal
- Thomas the Apostle
