= Mar Thoma Sleeha Syro-Malabar Church, Thulappally =

Catholic parish church in India

Mar Thoma Sleeha Syro-Malabar Church
- Mar Thoma Sleeha Syro-Malabar Church, Nilackal-Thulappally
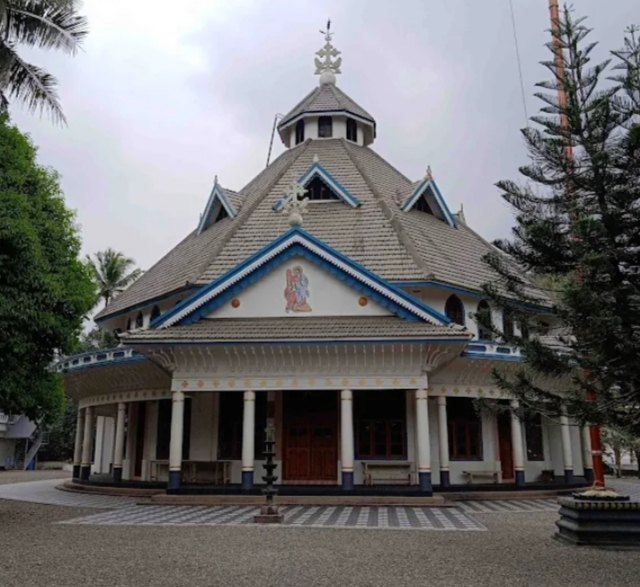
- Mar Thoma Sleeha Syro-Malabar Church
- Mar Thoma Sleeha Syro-Malabar Church
- 9°25′14.4″N 76°57′59.2″E
- Location: Thulappally, Pathanamthitta, Kerala
- Country: India
- Denomination: Catholic Church
- Sui iuris church: Syro-Malabar Church
- Website: http://www.smcim.org/church/nilackal

History
- Status: Parish
- Founded: 1956
- Dedication: Thomas the Apostle (Apostle of Jesus) from 2007. St.George (1956–2007)
- Dedicated: 3 July
- Consecrated: 17 January 1956

Architecture
- Functional status: Active

Administration
- District: Pathanamthitta
- Archdiocese: Syro-Malabar Catholic Archeparchy of Changanassery
- Diocese: Syro-Malabar Catholic Eparchy of Kanjirappally

Clergy
- Bishop: Jose Pulickal
- Vicar: James Kizhakkethakadiyel (Feb 2026–present)

Mar Thoma Sleeha Syro-Malabar Church is a pilgrimage church located in Thulappally, Syro-Malabar Catholic Eparchy of Kanjirappally in the Indian state of Kerala. The St. Thomas's feast festivities held there every July attract a number of devotees from in and around Kerala.

== About the parish ==
This catholic church is located in the eastern bank of the River Pampa, a holy river in Hindu mythology. The parish is surrounded by state forests. It is very close to the famous Hindu pilgrimage centers of the Sabarimala Sri Ayyappa Temple and the Nilackal Temple. The first church of Catholics has been established in the year 1956 and it was dedicated to St George. Recently the new church building has been constructed and the church has been dedicated in the name of St Thomas. This is done to show case that the Catholics of this are too are part of St Thomas Christian community which traces its origin to the arrival of St Thomas. The church renaming has been done to attract the pilgrims as the location is near to Nilackal/Chayal.

There are 325 Christian families and about 1850 members in the parish. Around 250 children attend the Sunday catechesis. it has four shrines.

The parish of Angelvalley was once the part of the parish. At the time of its formation, Angelvalley had around 250 families from the Nilackal, Thulapally parish.

The parish is divided into seventeen small groups called Koottayma, each known after a Biblical place such as Jerusalem, Jordan, Emmaus, Hermon, Kapharnaum, Saini, Corinthose, Thesalonica, Nazareth, Alphonsa, Chavara, Galathia, Carmel and Calvary. Nazareth and Carmel have A and B sections. Each of these groups meet weekly for prayer and study classes.

Parish social works are arranged under the 'Malanadu Development Society' which is the social service organization of the Diocese of Kanjirappally. Fifty S.H.G.s (Self Help Groups) get help from the M.D.S. Unit. It has a rural electrification system called 'Malanadu Mycro Hydel Power Project' Thulappally (M.H.P.P.). This power project generates electricity from water and supplies about 250 families, and shops, clinics, temples, mosques and churches. The parish helps milk-producing farmers to sell their milk under M.M.P. (Mahima Milk Producers Union). Under the leadership of M.D.S. Unit of the parish the people of Pampavalley made the longest Rubberized Road in Asia, two large bridges across the rivers Pampa and Azhuta, built many small bridges etc.

A government Primary School called St. Georges L.P.S. Thulappally which is under the management of the parish, and there are non-denominational social service institutions such as M.D.S., M.M.P. and M.H.P.P. serving all regardless of caste. Adoration sisters have their convent near the parish church.

Religious organisations working under the parish

- SMYM
- CML
- St. Vincent De Paul Society
- Mathrudeepthy
- Legion of Mary

Institutions under the parish

- St. George L.P. School

Syro-Malabar religious houses in the parish

- SABS Convent

== History ==
History of Christians here starts from the arrival of St. Thomas the Apostle. The apostle reached Nilakkal at 52 AD and started a Christian Community here. At that time, Nilackal was a 'Trade City' having trade relations with "Pandi-chola" states and 'Venadu'. There were 'Palace Roads' from their countries to 'Nilackal Thavalam' which were illumined by great lights (ex. Keralachaitram : K.P. Padmanabhan P. 145. Thiruvithamcore State mannel Vol. 1-p. 665 Vol. 2-p. 128) Since Nilackal was a vast region, there were many Christian churches here. Place here were known after the churches there. Even now places in the forests are called Plappally, Thulappally etc. The head Church of all these small churches was called 'Thalappally and later as Thulappally. (cfr. History of Christianity in Kerala by Nagamayyas P. 136). Old tombs of Christians are seen even now in the forest area near the present church unfortunately the invasion of some alien force called 'Vakkrippali attack' the inhabitants of Nilackal fled to other places such as Kanjirappally, Aruvithura, and other parts of the Meenachil. Nilackal is also called 'Chayal' since the place slopes towards the River 'Pampa'.

After a long time migration started to these remote places. It started as early as 1938. The recession felt in the socio-economic spheres after the first world war stimulated the migration to the hilly regions from the places. The majority of the immigrants were Nasranis of Malankara Mar Thoma Syrian church (One of the St Thomas Christian Church) and non – Christians, a substantial number of Catholics also came to those Hillocks. They soon felt the strong need for a Church to meet their spiritual as well as social needs.

A Catholic parish was set up under the leadership of Fr. George Ponnadathukallel. This church was actually dedicated for St George. They offered the first Qurbana in a temporary chapel on 12 February 1955. In 1960 it was officially given the status of a parish and Fr. Joseph Kalayil was appointed as the first Vicar.

=== New church ===
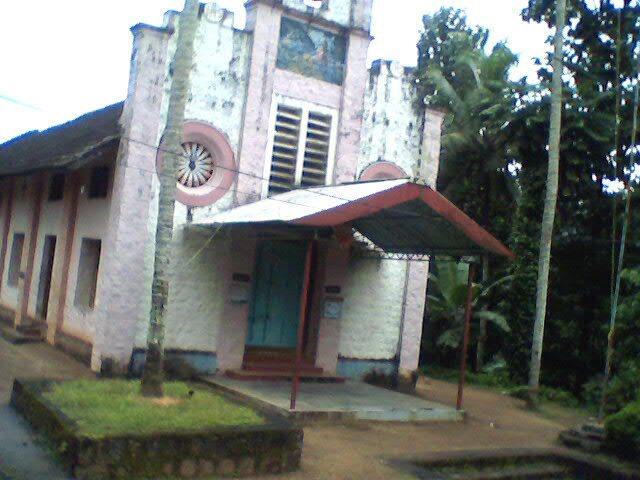
The old church

The name of the church was St. George from 1956 to 2007. The new church was blessed on 17 January 2007 along with new Name Mar Thoma Sleeha Church, Nilackal Thulappally. Fr.Martin Uppukunnel who was the vicar from 2002 to 2007 lead the work of the new church. The old church was demolished during 2015–2016.

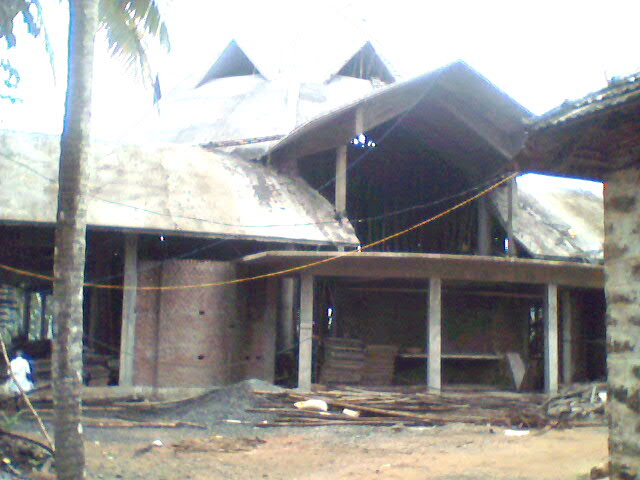
New church; while work in progress

=== Parish Hall ===
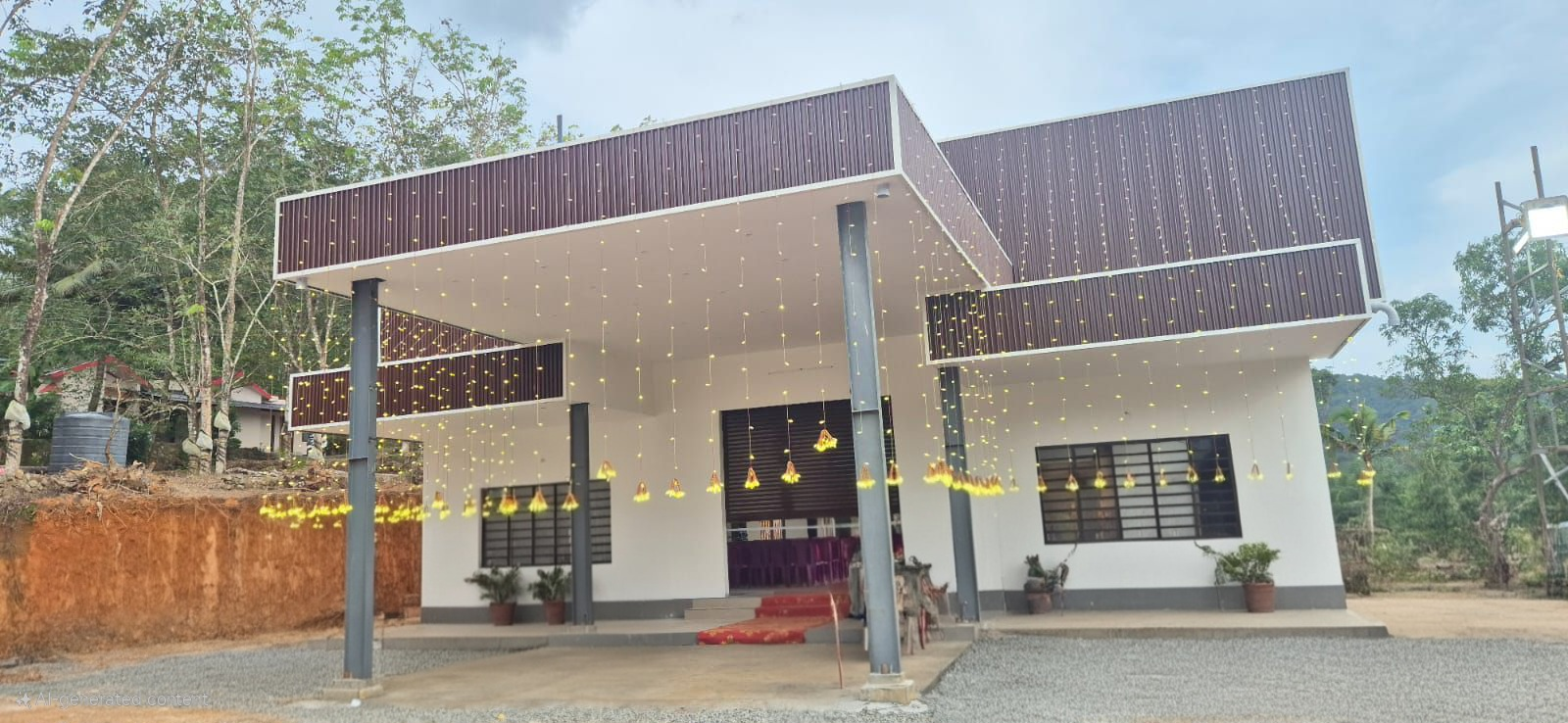
Parish Hall. Picture taken in September 2025

A new parish hall, constructed in just 184 days, was officially inaugurated on 9 September 2025 by Mar Jose Pulickal, the Bishop of the Syro-Malabar Catholic Eparchy of Kanjirappally. The hall was designed by the former vicar, Fr. Peter Mesthiriparambil, and completed during the tenure of the current vicar, Fr. Benny Thattamparabil.

== Annual events ==
- AD 52, 21 November – St. Thomas reached India. He started a Christian community at Nilackal
- 72, 3 July – St. Thomas received martyrdom at Mylappoor.
- 1938 – Migration Started
- 1947-48 – Government of Kerala gave the farmers certain area for food production
- 1955, 12 February– First Holy Qurbana
- 1960 – Parish erection
- 1964 – L.P. School
- 1968 – Parish Church construction started
- 1975 – Church consecration
- 1978 – S.A.B.S. Convent started
- 1984, 7 May – Presbytery
- 2007, 17 January – Established new church(Mar Thoma Sleeha Church)

=== St. Thomas Day ===
St. Thomas Day which celebrates the death of Thomas the Apostle is the most important festival celebrated in the church and is attended by thousands of people. Held every 3 July.

=== Parish's Day ===
Parish Day which celebrates the blessing memory of the new church which is happening every year from 17 January to 26 January. Grand celebration will be held in the last day (26 Jan) and mass is attended by thousands of adults and children of Kanjirappally Diocese.
