= Vayyattupuzha =

- village
- Location in Kerala, India Vayyattupuzha (India)
- Coordinates: 9°18′39″N 76°57′24″E
- Country: India
- State: Kerala
- District: Pathanamthitta

Government
  - Type: Panchayath

Languages
  - Official: Malayalam, English
- Time zone: UTC+5:30 (IST)
- PIN: 689663
- Vehicle registration: KL-62, KL-03

Vayyattupuzha is a village situated near to Chittar in Pathanamthitta district, Kerala. It is predominantly a rural hilly area but is very famous for spice trade.

KC Raghunatha Pillai, the Vehicle Director of the Chandrayaan 2 mission is from this village.

== See also ==
- Nilakkal
- Uthimoodu
- Chittar
- Seethathodu
- Angamoozhy
- Pathanamthitta
