= State Highway 67 (Kerala) =

Highway in Kerala, India

State Highway 67
- Mannarkulanji - Pampa Road
- SH 67 highlighted in red

Route information
- Maintained by Kerala Public Works Department
- Length: 56.75 km (35.26 mi)
- Component highways: NH 183A from Mannarkulanji to Plappally Jn.

Major junctions
- West end: NH 183A / SH 8 in Mannarkulanji
- SH 44 in Elavunkal
- East end: Pampa Triveni

Location
- Country: India
- State: Kerala
- Districts: Pathanamthitta

Highway system
- Roads in India; Expressways; National; State; Asian; State Highways in Kerala
← SH 66	→ SH 68

State Highway 67 (SH 67) is a state highway in Kerala, India that starts in Mannarkulanji and ends in Pampa Thriveni Bridge. The highway is 44.1 km long.

== Route map ==
Route map
- Mannarakulanji - Vadasserikkara - Perunad - Laha - Plappally - Elavumkal - Nilakkal - Attathodu - Chalakkayam - Pamba triveni bridge

== See also ==
- Roads in Kerala
- List of state highways in Kerala
