= Thekkummala =

- village
- Location in Kerala, India Thekkummala (India)
- Coordinates: 9°19′0″N 76°49′0″E
- Country: India
- State: Kerala
- District: Pathanamthitta

Languages
  - Official: Malayalam, English
- Time zone: UTC+5:30 (IST)
- PIN: 689664
- Vehicle registration: KL-03

Thekkummala is a small hill village in Vadasserikara Panchayat in Pathanamthitta district, India.
