= Kallar River (Pamba) =

Tributary of Pamba river

Kallar
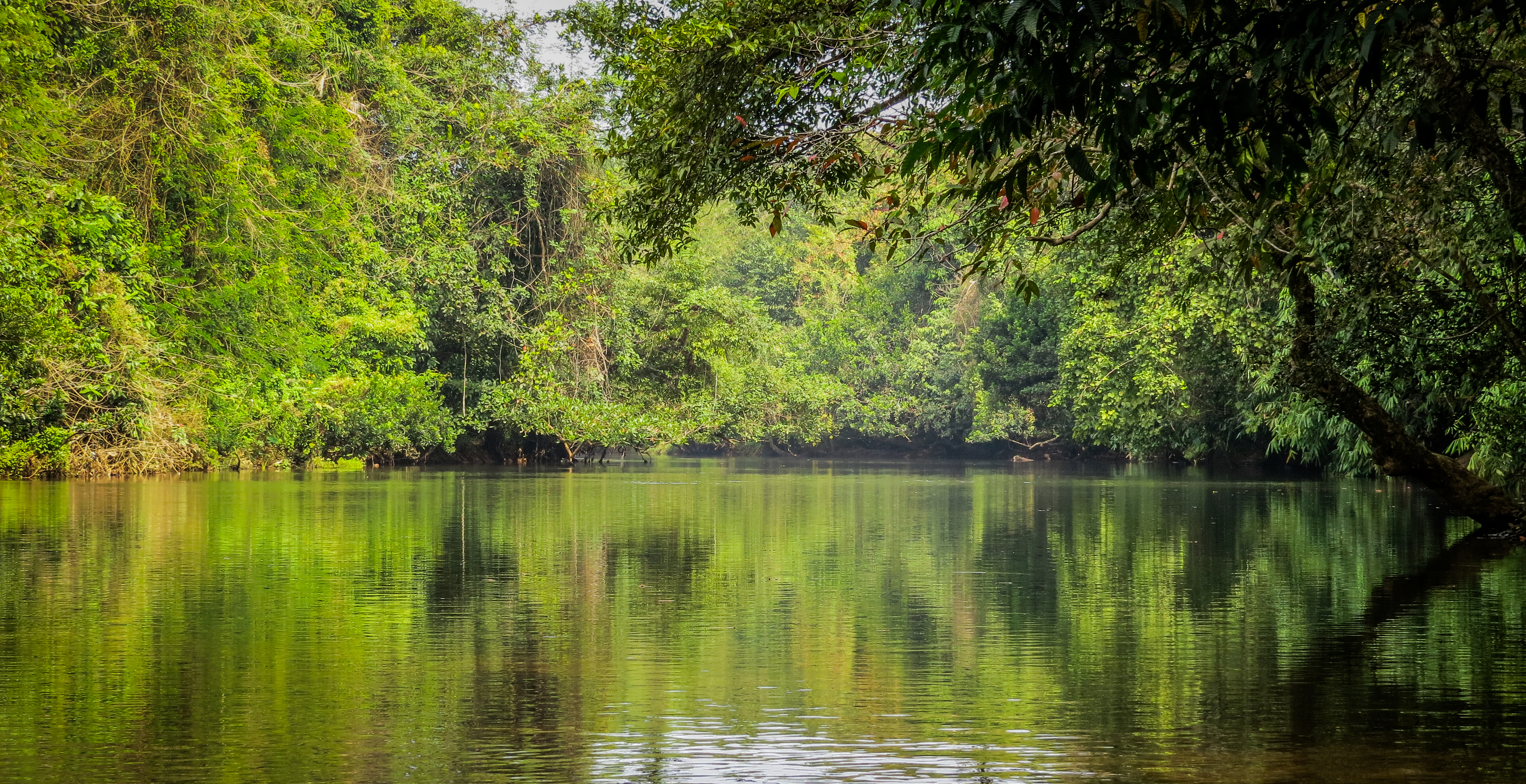
- Kallar river at Adavi

- Location of the mouth in Kerala Kallar River (Pamba) (India)
- Etymology: Combination of two Malayalam words, Kallu (stone) and Aar (river), meaning stony river
- Native name: കല്ലാർ (Malayalam)

Location
- Country: India
- State: Kerala
- District: Pathanamthitta

Physical characteristics
- Mouth: Pamba
  - location: Vadasserikara
  - coordinates: 9°20′34″N 76°49′43″E
  - elevation: 13 m (43 ft)

Basin features
- Landmarks: Adavi eco-tourism
- Cities: Thekkuthodu; Thannithode; Vadasserikara
- Waterfalls: Chengara waterfalls
- Bridges: Mundonmoozhi bridge Vadasserikara bridge Pengattu Kadav bridge

Kallar is a perennial tributary of Pamba river, the third longest river in the South Indian state of Kerala. Kallar originates in the forests of Ranni reserve in the eastern part of Pathanamthitta district.

As the name implies, the river bed is mostly stony (Kallu+aar = Stony River). It flows its entire length through rich forests before merging with Pamba at Vadasserikkara.

Small villages such as Thannithode, Thekkuthode and Manneera are the major human settlements along the banks of this river. Kallar is the main component of Adavi eco-tourism project at Mannera in the Konni forest division where it offers an opportunity for coracle riding along a three kilometer stretch. The river supports rich diversity of plants and animals.
