= History of Pathanamthitta district =

This is the History of Pathanamthitta district. Pathanamthitta district is located in the southern region of Kerala, a state in South India.

== History of Pandalam dynasty ==
It is believed that the Pandya kings of Tamil Nadu fled to Pandalam in the face of an attack from Cholas and settled there in the land they bought from Kaipuzha Thampan, a landlord. The Pandya dynasty had provinces on either sides of the Western Ghats.

=== Travancore Rule ===
The King of Pandalam helped Marthanda Varma to conquer the Kayamkulam province. In return for this help, Marthanda Varma did not attempt to attack and conquer Pandalam or Adoor, during the expansion of his kingdom.Pandalam was annexed to Travancore in 1820. Before the formation of Pathanamthitta district, Pandalam was in Mavelikara taluk of Alappuzha district. King Marthandavarma once came to Sasthamcotta to hide from ettuveettil pillai's (a wealthy family who tried to capture King Marthandavarma and to get hold of his throne) and sought the help of nellimuttil family . Mannadi is also another historical place near Adoor where Velu Thampi Dalava died evading the Britishers. Pandalam was part of Central Travancore and was never directly under British Rule. Pathanamthitta was a major town of wealthy Hindu, Syrian Christian families .

=== Late Travancore Rule and Indian Rule ===
By the twentieth century Adoor was a fully developed town, with modern facilities like schools, libraries, hospitals etc. After the independence of India, Adoor was made a municipality in 1988 and Pandalam after 2000.

== History of Ranni ==
The history of Ranni can be traced 5000 years back to the early settlement activity of Adi Dravidans around Sabarimala and Nilackal. The temple at Sabarimala is an early temple of Kerala, dating back to around 2000 years. The deity's sitting posture and resemblance of the prayer 'Sharanam vili' to "Buddham Sharanam / Sangam Sharanam" points to the Buddhist past. Buddhist hermits always prefer to stay in interior jungles for solitary contemplation to attain Nirvana. The word 'Ayya' is a Buddhist Pali word means Lord/God. There was an ancient trade route passed through Nilackal between Kerala and Pandian kingdom.
