= Thalappara Kotta =

Thalappara Fort
- തലപ്പാറ കോട്ട
- Location in Kerala

Religion
- Affiliation: Hinduism
- District: Pathanamthitta
- Region: Goodrical forest range
- Deity: Ayyappa
- Festival: Mandala-Makaravilakku period
- Leadership: Kochuvelan

Location
- Location: Plappally
- State: Kerala
- Country: India
- Interactive map of Thalappara Fort
- Coordinates: 9.5723°N 76.5560°E

Architecture
- Type: Fort
- Style: Traditional temple architecture
- Founder: Pandalam raja

Thalappara Kotta (തലപ്പാറ കോട്ട) and Villaliveera are closely related to Sabarimala rituals and ceremonies. According to myths, Manikanda on his journey to Sabarimala was accompanied by Villaliveera, the Thalappara chief. Manikanda considered him as his own father, thus like the Pandalam royal representative, members of Kochuvelan lineage are not permitted to cross the Sabarimala pathinettampadi.

Kochuvela has the right to perform poojas on Thiruvabharanam which is processioned to Sabarimala on the day of Makara samkramam. The Thiruvabharanam is only taken after the poojas by kochuvela. After completing the poojas, Kochuvela accompanies the Thiruvabharanam procession. When he performs the poojas, royal symbols like Rajamudra, Aramanisanku, sword, stick, and turban are worn.

After completing his tasks, Manikanda informed Pandalam raja about his journey to Sabarimala which made the raja worried about his son. He was so concerned about his son's protection. Upon seeking advice from his gurus, 99 tribal chiefs were summoned to the palace. All of them decided to appoint Thalappara moopan, chief of Thalappara mala to protect Manikanda. He was given the title Kochuvela and provided the royal symbols like Conch shell, Aramani, sword, stick and a turban. Thalappara kotta was built for Manikanda to conduct poojas and for taking rest on his journey to Sabarimala. The members of Kochuvela lineage still follows this rituals and ceremonies without any faults.

Kochuvelan conducts poojas here on every Mandala-Makaravilakku period and the first day of every Malayalam month. After conducting the poojas, Pandalam raja gives him a small money bag as a reward. It is believed that when Kochuvelan reaches the kotta, he is guarded by an elephant and a dog. In the past, this fort was situated on "Pandalam thara" (a trek route connecting Pandalam and Sabarimala) which was later replaced to Plappally, in the Mannarakkulanji - Chalakkayam highway by the efforts of forest officials. Most pilgrims passing through this route burns a Camphor (karppooram) here.
