= Nilakkal Sree Mahadeva Temple =

Hindu temple in Kerala, India

- നിലയ്ക്കൽ ശ്രീ മഹാദേവ ക്ഷേത്രം
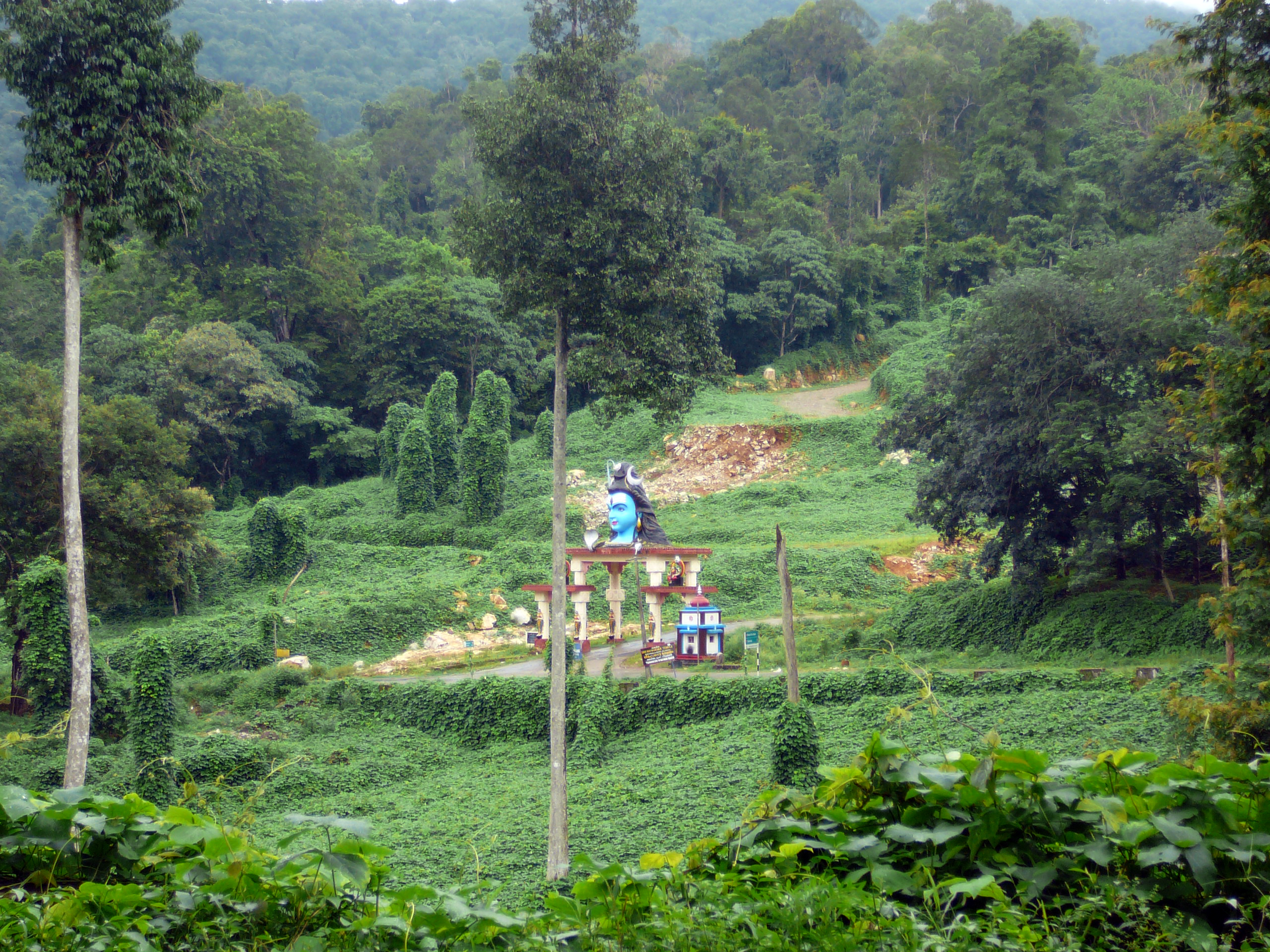
- Nilakkal temple entrance arch

- Mahadeva Temple, Nilakkal, Pathanamthitta, Kerala

Religion
- Affiliation: Hinduism
- District: Pathanamthitta
- Deity: Shiva
- Festivals: Maha Shivaratri, Thiruvutsavam
- Governing body: Travancore Devaswom Board

Location
- Location: Nilakkal
- State: Kerala
- Country: India
- Interactive map of Nilakkal Sree Mahadeva Temple
- Coordinates: 9°23′22.7″N 77°00′44.8″E

Architecture
- Type: Traditional Kerala style
- Completed: 1960

Specifications
- Temple: One
- Elevation: 386.3 m (1,267 ft)

Nilakkal Sree Mahadeva Temple is a Hindu temple located in Pathanamthitta district in the Indian state of Kerala. The temple which is dedicated to Lord Shiva is administered by Travancore Devaswom Board. During Sabarimala pilgrimage, many devotees from Kerala and other states visit the temple.

== Location ==
It is located just 1 km from the main highway leading to Sabarimala temple. The shrine is surrounded by thick forests and rubber plantations. This temple is situated with the geographic coordinates of 9°23′22.7″N 77°00′44.8″E at an altitude of about 386.3 m above the mean sea level.

== Worship ==
Lord Shiva is the principal deity. The pratishta is believed to be in two moods, Ugramoorthy (fierce) and Mangala pradayakan (auspicious). A common belief is that Lord Shiva is showering his blessings to his son Lord Ayyappa to fight against all evil spirits while throwing all anger to the evils. As in many Shiva shrines, a number of oxen are protected in the temple premises.

== Subordinate deities ==
There is only two Upa Prathishtas (sub deities) here, Lord Kannimoola Ganapathi and Nandi.

== Poojas ==
Three Poojas are held here every day. The morning section includes Usha pooja, noon section with Ucha pooja and the desk section concludes with Deeparadhana. Special weekly days are Sunday, Monday and Friday.

== Festivals ==
The 'Maha Shivaratri' held annually is one of the noted festivals of the temple. Besides Shivarathri, the temple celebrates its Thiruvutsavam every year in a grand style. At times of Sabarimala pilgrimage, devotees from various states visit the temple for welfare and sake.

== See also ==
- Sabarimala
- List of Hindu temples in Kerala
