= 33 kV Substation, Perunad =

Kerala State Electricity Board Limited
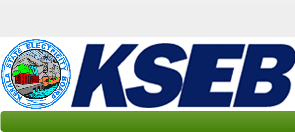
- Type: Public Sector Company
- Industry: Transmission
- Founded: February 16, 2012
- Headquarters: Perunad, Kerala, India
- Area served: Kerala, India
- Key people: Jibin Samuel (Assistant Engineer) Linu M Rajan (Sub Engineer)
- Products: Electricity
- Parent: Kerala State Electricity Board
- Website: kseb.in

33 kV substation, Perunad is a transmission part of Kerala State Electricity Board, a public sector agency under the Government of Kerala, India, that transmits the electricity supply in the state. Established in 2012, the agency comes under the authority of the Department of Power.

Perunad Substation inaugurated by Minister Aryadan Muhammed.

== General ==
There is only 1 no. 5 MVA, 33 kV Power transformer installed in the bay. The station auxiliary supply is taken from a 250 kVA, 11 kV transformer which is tapped from the 11 kV bus, in the station.

In addition to RPG 1 and RPG 2.2 No: 11 kV feeders in the 11 kV bus. One is an 11 kV town feeder from this station for feeding the nearby Vadasserikkara, Perunad area. Hence 11 kV town and 11 kV Perunad breaker can be put in alternate use. Similarly two 11 kV AB switches are installed in the substation compound for the selection of 11 kV TOWN/PERUNAD supply. The maintenance of the ABs and its DPs are carried out by Electrical section Vadasserikkara.

The custodian of feeders such as RPG-1, RPG-2, 33 kV PTPE etc. are Electrical section Vadasserikkara.

The 11 kV Town/Perunad feeder can be extended to 11 kV Vadasserikkara feeder from the Ranni 110 kV substation. Usually this is done by the field staff of Electrical section, Vadasserikkara by closing the 11 kV Delta AB. During the failure of the 33 kV PTPE feeder, the SHEP R-PND is connected to the grid through 11k V Vadasserikkara feeder, the load in the Vadasserikkara feeder is regulated by Electrical section Vadasserikkara for easy synchronisation.

== Introduction ==
The substation is fed from 110 kV substation Pathanamthitta through one 33 kV feeder (33 kV PTPE feeder). The two 11 kV feeders RPG 1.RPG-2 are fed from the small 2x2 MW hydroelectric project at Ranni Perunad works under the tail race of 12 MW, Maniyar Hydro Electric Project by Carborundum Universal Ltd. The RPG-1 and RPG-2 are mainly used for the power evacuation from R-PND SHEP while on generation and also used for taking auxiliary supply from R-PND 33 kV substation.

== Feeder ==
Feeders in Perunad substation
| Feeder Name | Voltage Level | Handling Electrical Section |
| RPG-1 | 11 kV | Vadasserikkara Section |
| RPG-2 | 11 kV | Vadasserikkara Section |
| PTPE | 33 kV | Vadasserikkara Section |
| Perunad | 11 kV | Vadasserikkara Section |
| Perunad Town | 11 kV | Vadasserikkara Section |
