= Angamoozhy =

- Town/village
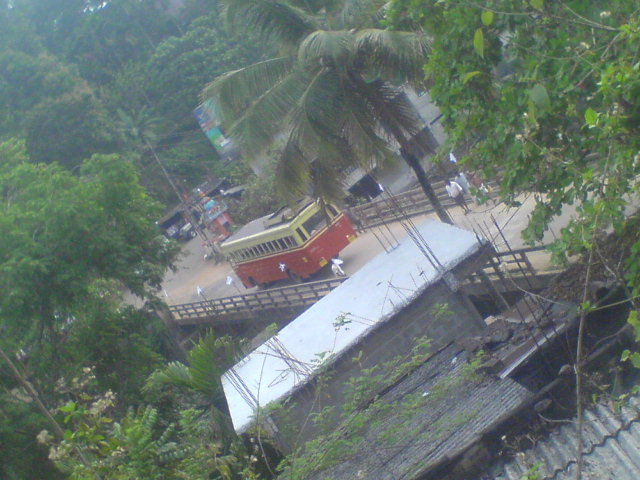
- Angamoozhy bridge

- Location in Kerala, India Angamoozhy (India)
- Coordinates: 9°21′33″N 76°59′19″E
- Country: India
- State: Kerala
- District: Pathanamthitta
- Elevation: 19 m (62 ft)

Languages
  - Official: Malayalam, English
- Time zone: UTC+5:30 (IST)
- PIN: 689662
- Telephone code: 04735
- Vehicle registration: KL- 83
- Climate: Tropical summer (Köppen)
- Avg. summer temperature: 35 °C (95 °F)
- Avg. winter temperature: 18 °C (64 °F)
- Website: www.angamoozhy.com

Angamoozhy is a small village in the Pathanamthitta district in the Indian state of Kerala. It is located near the Kakkad power station and the Sabarimala temple. Geographically, Angamoozhy is located in the Western Ghats mountain range. The name Angamoozhy derives from Anamoozhy, a reference to elephants visiting the town centre.

== Geography ==
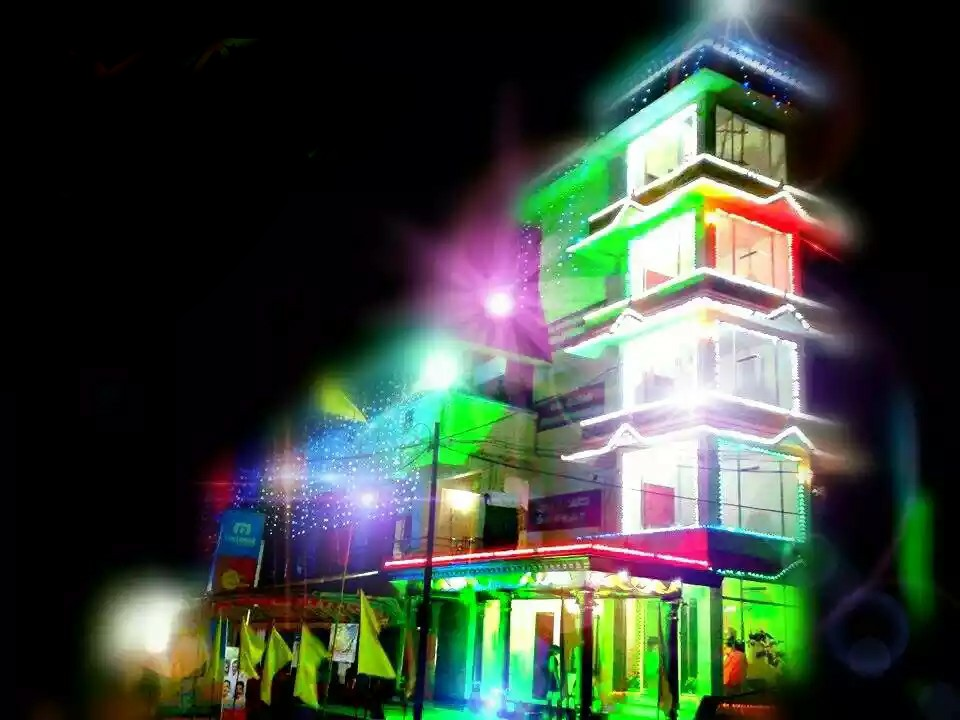
Sree Narayana Guru Mandhiram (night view)

Angamoozhy is a high-altitude area (Malanadu) situated in the southeastern part of Kerala, very close to the Western Ghats mountain range. A small river, Kakkattar (a tributary of the Pamba River), marks the centre of Angamoozhy. The second-largest hydroelectric project in Kerala, Sabarigiri, is located in this village.

In October 2021, after heavy rainfall, Angamoozhy was affected by landslides in the nearby forests, as well as flooding of the Angamoozhy-Kottamonpara bridge and Angamoozhy town.

Angamoozhy has an average elevation of 18 m (59 ft) above sea level.

Angamoozhy is located 3 kilometres away from Seethathodu.

Angamoozhy is the gateway to Sabarimala, a major pilgrimage centre in Kerala. The area also has several dams and adjoining man-made reservoirs.

=== Climate ===
Angamoozhy

Climate chart (precipitation, max. and min. temperature)
J	F	M	A	M	J	J	A	S	O	N	D
16 32 22	236 33 23	76 33 24	167 33 25	125 32 25	595 30 24	232 29 23	563 29 23	297 30 23	196 30 23	93 30 23	88 31 23
- █ Average max. and min. temperatures in °C
- █ Precipitation totals in mm
Imperial conversion
J	F	M	A	M	J	J	A	S	O	N	D
0.6 89 72	9.3 91 73	3 91 75	6.6 91 77	4.9 89 76	23 85 74	9.1 85 74	22 85 74	12 86 74	7.7 86 74	3.7 87 74	3.4 88 73
- █ Average max. and min. temperatures in °F
- █ Precipitation totals in inches

== Administration ==
Angamoozhy is located in Seethathodu Panchayat and is included in the Konni taluk in Pathanamthitta district. It is located 45.7 kilometers away from Pathanamthitta towards the east. Nearby panchayats are Chittar, Perunad, Vadaserikkara, and Konni.

Communist parties have a strong base in Angamoozhy. The Communist Party of India (Marxist)-led Left Democratic Front (LDF) governs both anchayat wards in Angamoozhy and the Seethathodu Panchayat is controlled by the LDF.

Angamoozhy was previously a part of the Ranni legislative assembly constituency but is now included in the Konni assembly. In the 2021 Kerala Legislative Assembly election K. U. Jenish Kumar of the Communist Party of India (Marxist) won the Konni seat. It is his second term.

It was also formerly in the Idukki parliamentary constituency but is currently part of Pathanamthitta. In the 2024 Indian general election, Anto Antony of the Indian National Congress party won the election for the seat, marking his fourth consecutive term representing Pathanamthitta.

== Etymology ==
Angamoozhy is a historic town with references since the 19th century. The name Angamoozhy derives from Anamoozhy, which is the name of the junction visited by the elephants at the center of the town. In Malayalam, Ana means elephant, and Moozhy means town.

== Population ==
The people of Angamoozhy are mainly agriculturists and plantation workers. People began settling in Angamoozhy about 100 years ago. The people mainly belong to Hindu, Christian, and Muslim religions. There are several places of religious worship in Angamoozhy. In many of the families based in Angamoozhy, there are large numbers of people working outside Kerala as well as outside India.

Trespassing leopards are perceived as unusually dangerous in Angamoozhy, affecting in particular the prospects of men seeking marriage with women from outside the village. In February 2012, one leopard which had killed two dogs in the village was suffocated and forcibly pushed by a mob of almost 100 people, eventually killing it. In 2022 it was reported that no marriage proposals were received in the preceding three or four years.

1. Hinduism (72.3%)
2. Christianity (21.6%)
3. Islam (6.10%)

== Economy and Agriculture ==
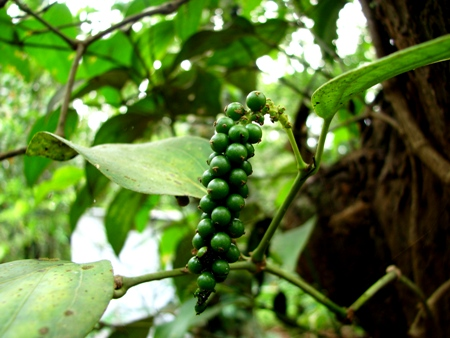
Pepper - the King of Spices - on a Pepper Vine

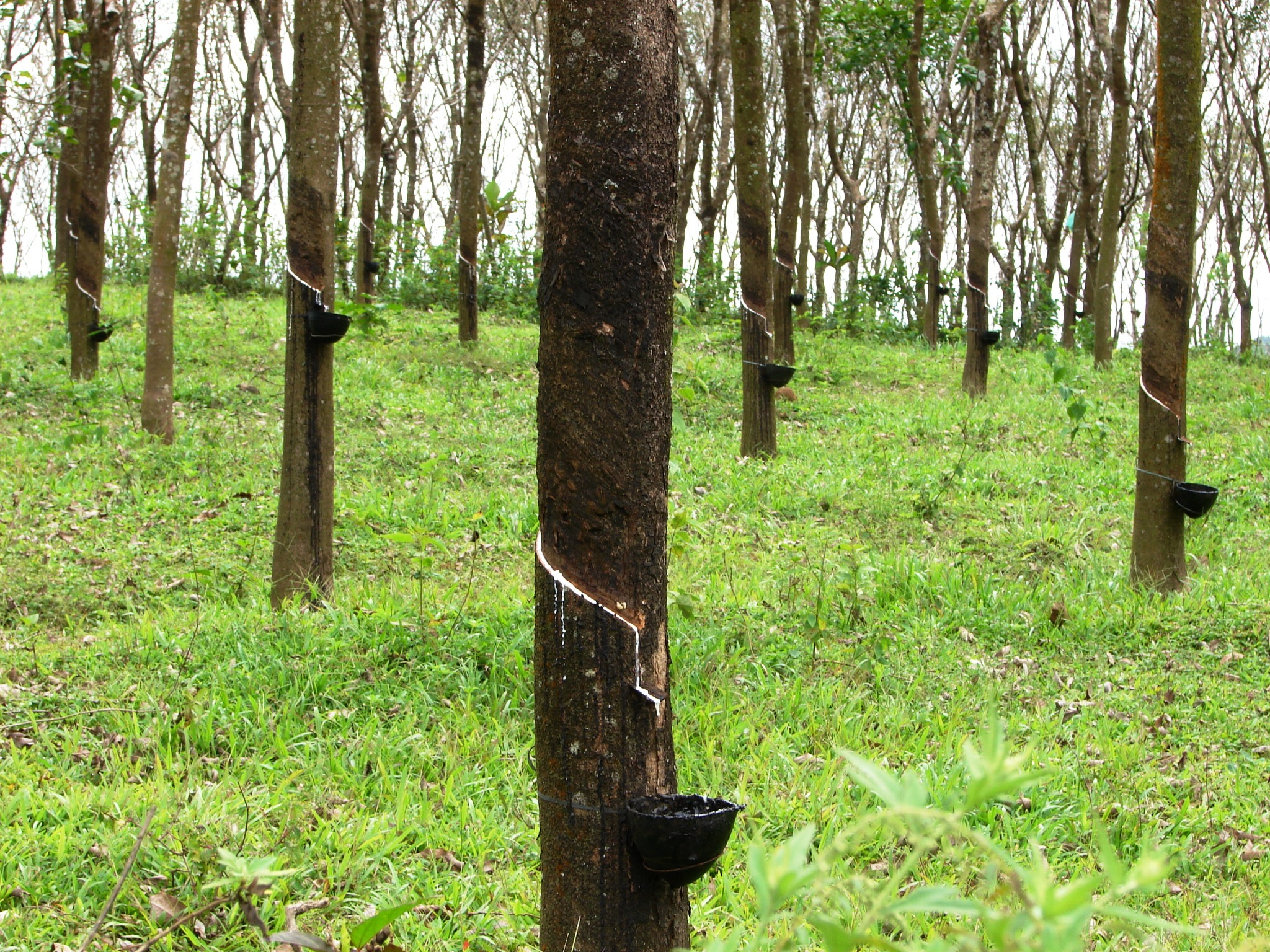
Rubber trees in a Plantation

Agriculture is the main occupation in Angamoozhy, where about 75% of the population is dependent on this sector. Due to its high humidity and mountainous terrain, it was initially suitable for growing tea and coffee. Later, rubber became the most important crop, with its plantations covering over 478 square kilometres (185 sq mi). Tapioca (cassava) and pulses are the important dryland crops. Other major crops are coconut, banana, pepper and ginger. In certain areas, cashew, pineapple, sugarcane, cocoa, and other tree spices are cultivated. There is also increased interest in the real estate market, with eco-friendly housing gaining popularity in Angamoozhy.

== Temples ==
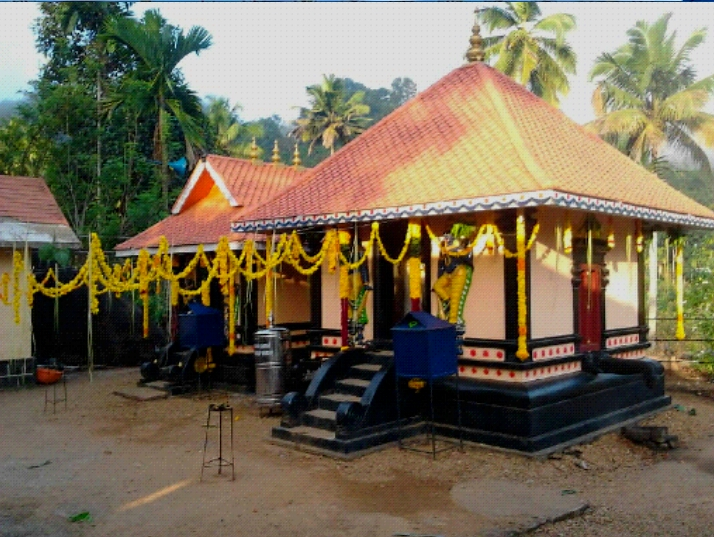
Sree Shakthi Dharmasastha Temple

The only temple in Angamoozhy is Sree Shakthi Dharma Shastha Temple, dedicated to Lord Ayyappa and a goddess. Shiva, Ganapathy and Nagaraja are other sub-deities. The temple festival (Utsava) is held annually in the months of March and April. During Sabarimala season, many pilgrims visit this temple on their way to Sabarimala. The temple provides facilities such as food and shelter.

== Chayalppadi Church ==
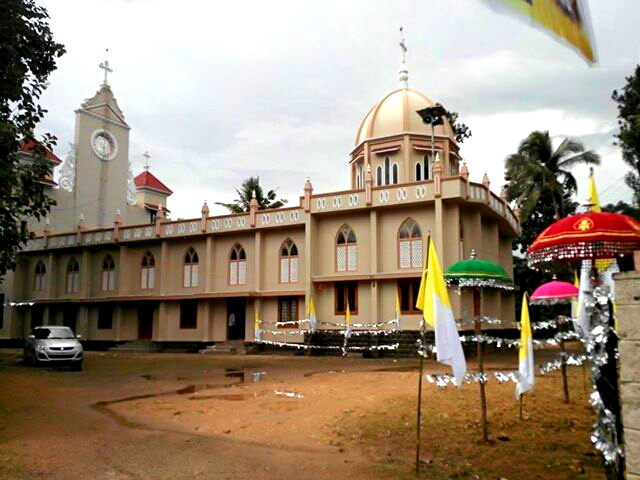
St.Thomas Chayalpadi Malankara Catholic Church, Angamoozhy

One of the first members of the Kurisumala Ashram in Vagamon, Fr. Nadamala Philipose, arrived at Angamoozhy on 2 April 1972. It was an underdeveloped region situated between two major pilgrim centers of Kerala, namely the Sabarimala Temple and the Nilackal St. Thomas Church. With the blessing of Archbishop Benedict Mar Gregorios, the Metropolitan of Trivandrum, Fr. Nadamala reached this mission centre. With the intention of the renewal of the Nilackal church (one of the seven churches established by St. Thomas, the Apostle) Fr. Nadamala started residing in this forest area inhabited by wild animals. Along with this mission, he was also involved in the social development activities of the locality. When he reached the place, there was only a small chapel made of grass belonging to the Archdiocese of Trivandrum. But the people of the location, including Hindus, Christians, and Muslims jointly built a hut thatched with grass for him to reside in. He gave the name to his new hut, 'Chayalpadi', which means "entrance (padi) to Nilakkal (chayal)".

== Education ==
Important schools:

- Gurkulam U.P.S Angamoozhy
- S.A.V.H.S Angamoozhy
- Cherupushpam Eng. Medium Nursery School Angamoozhy

== Transportation ==
Airports: Thiruvananthapuram's Thiruvananthapuram International Airport and Kochi's Cochin International Airport are almost the same distance from Angamoozhy (about a three-hour drive).

Railways: The nearest railway stations are Chengannur (65 km), and Thiruvalla (69 km).

Roads: NH 183A (Pathanamthitta - Mannarakulanji - Vadasserikara - Plappally - Angamoozhy - Moozhiyar - Kumily) passes through Angamoozhy. Pilgrims to Sabarimala temple go there via Plappally (SH 67). On their return from Plappally they follow NH 183A to Angamoozhy before taking another road that connects via Chittar to NH 183 at Vadasserikara.

Buses: Both state-run KSRTC and privately operated buses connect Angamoozhy to Pathanamthitta konni towns. All major long-route buses stop at Angamoozhy Junction.

Local Transport: Taxis (auto-rickshaws, cabs, etc.) are available on every road, and have their slots in all major junctions. Smaller buses ply at regular intervals to internal locations, as there are narrow roads.

== Feature films in Angamoozhy ==
Some sequences of the Malayalam film Captain were shot in Angamoozhy. The film Ordinary, starring Kunchacko Boban, was shot in Gavi near Angamoozhy.

== Hospitals and medical stores ==
- Government Primary Health Centre
- Chaithanya Hospital
- Government Homoeo hospital
