= Thannithode =

- Village
- Location in Kerala, India Thannithode (India)
- Coordinates: 9°15′50″N 76°53′0″E
- Country: India
- State: Kerala
- District: Pathanamthitta
- Taluk: Konni

Government
  - Type: Panchayat
  - Body: Thannithode Panchayat

Population (2011)
  - Total: 12,508

Languages
  - Official: Malayalam, English
- Time zone: UTC+5:30 (IST)
- PIN: 689699
- Vehicle registration: KL-83
- Nearest city: Konni

Thannithode is a village in Pathanamthitta district in the state of Kerala, India. It is near Konni town and is mainly a plantation township. The famous Adavi eco-tourism is situated in Thannithode.

== Demographics ==
As of 2011 India census, Thannithode had a population of 12508 with 5963 males and 6545 females.
