= Chittar, Kerala =

Chittar
- town/village
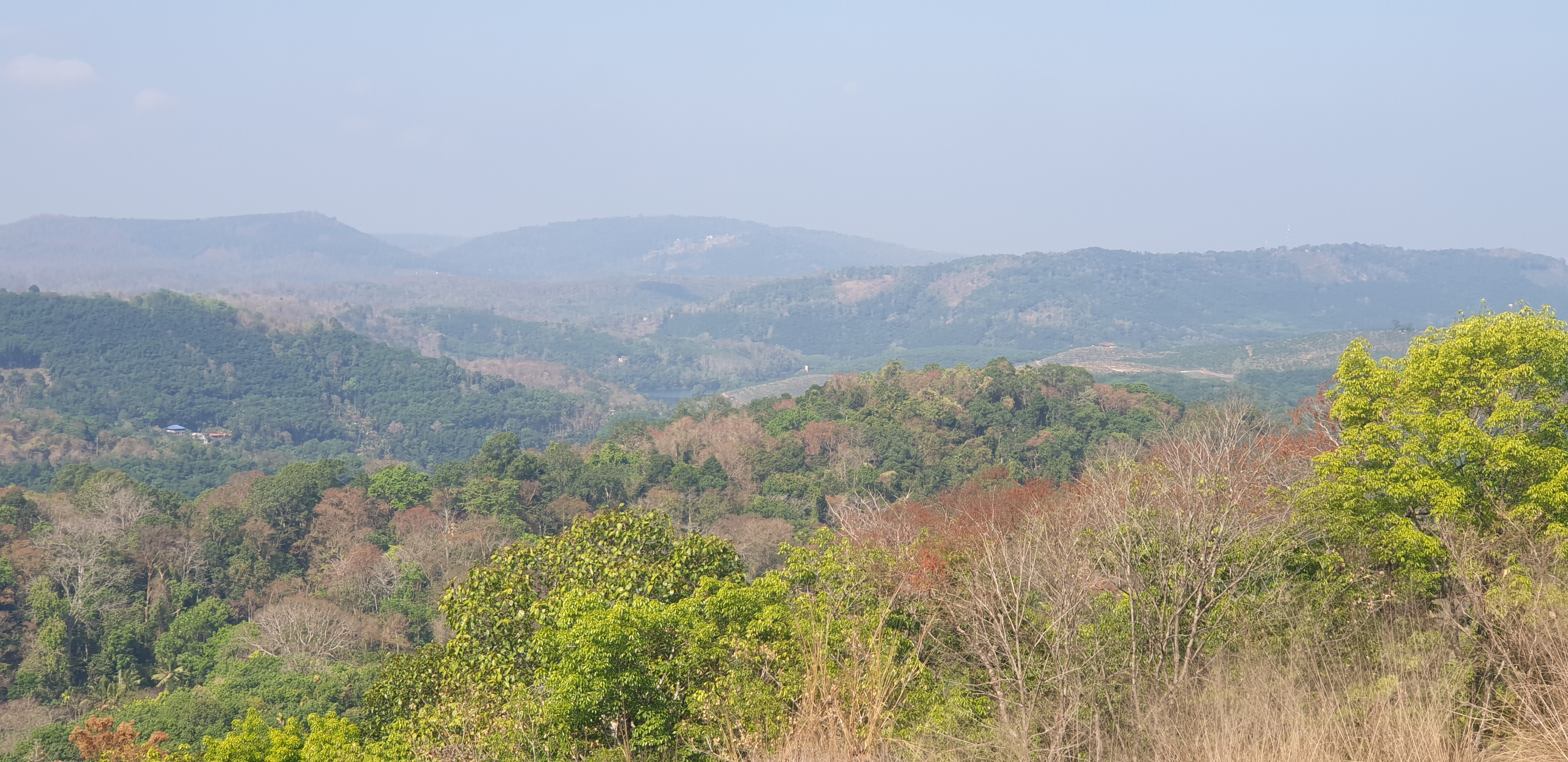
- Chittar

- Location in Kerala, India Chittar (India)
- Coordinates: 9°19′58″N 76°55′58″E
- Country: India
- State: Kerala
- District: Pathanamthitta

Government
  - Type: Democratic
  - Body: Chittar grama panchayath

Area
  - Total: 25.9 km^{2} (10.0 sq mi)

Population (2011)
  - Total: 31,969
  - Density: 1,230/km^{2} (3,200/sq mi)

Languages
  - Official: Malayalam, English
- Time zone: UTC+5:30 (IST)
- PIN: 689663
- Telephone code: 04735
- Vehicle registration: KL-62, KL-03, KL-83
- Coastline: 0 kilometres (0 mi)
- Nearest city. Trivandrum: Vadasserikkara, Thiruvalla, Konni
- Climate: Tropical summer (Köppen)
- Avg. summer temperature: 35 °C (95 °F)
- Avg. winter temperature: 18 °C (64 °F)
- Website: lsgkerala.in/chittarpanchayat/

Chittar is a village in Pathanamthitta district, located in Kerala state, India. It is a Panchayat and is situated in the Konni Thaluk. It is part of the Konni state legislative constituency and of the Pathanamthitta Lok Sabha constituency. Chittar was given the Nirmal Gram award from former president Pratibha Patil.

== Economy ==
Chittar is predominantly a plantation township. Earlier famed for tea and coffee, nowadays swaying rubber trees have replaced them, fuelled by the fertile land and rich ecosystem. In addition to rubber cultivation, pineapple, tapioca, nuts, ginger, and pepper are cultivated. It was once a part of the demolished Nilakkal trade centre.

== Location ==
Chittar lies in the eastern part of Pathanamthitta district. Thiruvalla, which is 53 km away, has the nearest railway station and access to NH 183. Pathanamthitta is 29 km to the east.

== Administration ==
The panchayath of Chittar was formed on 30 September 1970 by partitioning the Vadaseerikkara and Seethathodu panchayaths in Ranni taluk. For administrative convenience, the panchayath is divided into 13 wards.

1. Pambini
2. Panniyar
3. Manakkayam
4. Chittar
5. Chittar thottam
6. Meenkuzhi
7. Kulangaravali
8. Vayyattupuzha
9. Manpilavu
10. Neelipilavu
11. kattachira
12. Chittar thekkekkara
13. Kodumudi

Before becoming part of Konni legislative assembly Chittar was represented by the Ranni legislative assembly. Chittar's Lok Sabha constituency also changed from Idukki to Pathanamthitta.

== Education ==
Chittar has one Government High School, two higher secondary education facilities, in addition to several middle schools and lower primary schools. Chittar also has a college.

Important schools:

- Govt. L.P.S. Chittar Estate
- L.P.School Neeliplavu,
- Holy Family Public School,
- Govt. H. S. S., Chittar,
- Govt. Model L. P. S., Chittar,
- V. K. N. M. V. H. S. S, Vayyattupuzha
- Komala Vilasm School, Padayanippara
- Little Angels English Medium High School karikayam
- Royal Parallel College, Chittar
- Santhinikethan College Chittar.

Nearby Colleges:

- SNDP Arts College, Ettichuvadu - Meenkuzhi, chittar
- Caarmel Engineering College, R-Perunad
- Ideal Parallel College, Chittar
- Musalliar Engineering College, *Malayalappuzha
- Mount Zion Engineering College, Kadammanitta
- Pushpagiri Medical College, Tiruvalla
- Muthoot Nursing College, Pathanamthitta
- St. Thomas College, Ranni,
- Catholicate College, Pathanamthitta
- Mar Ivanios ITC, Seethathodu

== Population ==
The people of Chittar are mainly agriculturists and plantation workers. People began settling down in Chittar about 75 years ago. The people mainly belong to Hindu, Christian and Muslim religions. There are several places of religious worship in Chittar. In many of the families based in Chittar, there are large numbers of people working outside Kerala as well as outside India. The new generation is highly educated and well placed in different parts of the world includes merchant navy engineers, doctors, civil engineers and well known scientists. K.C. Raghunatha Pillai, the vehicle director for the Chandrayaan-2 mission is an example.

As of 2011 India census, Chittar had a population of 31969 with 15282 males and 16687 females.

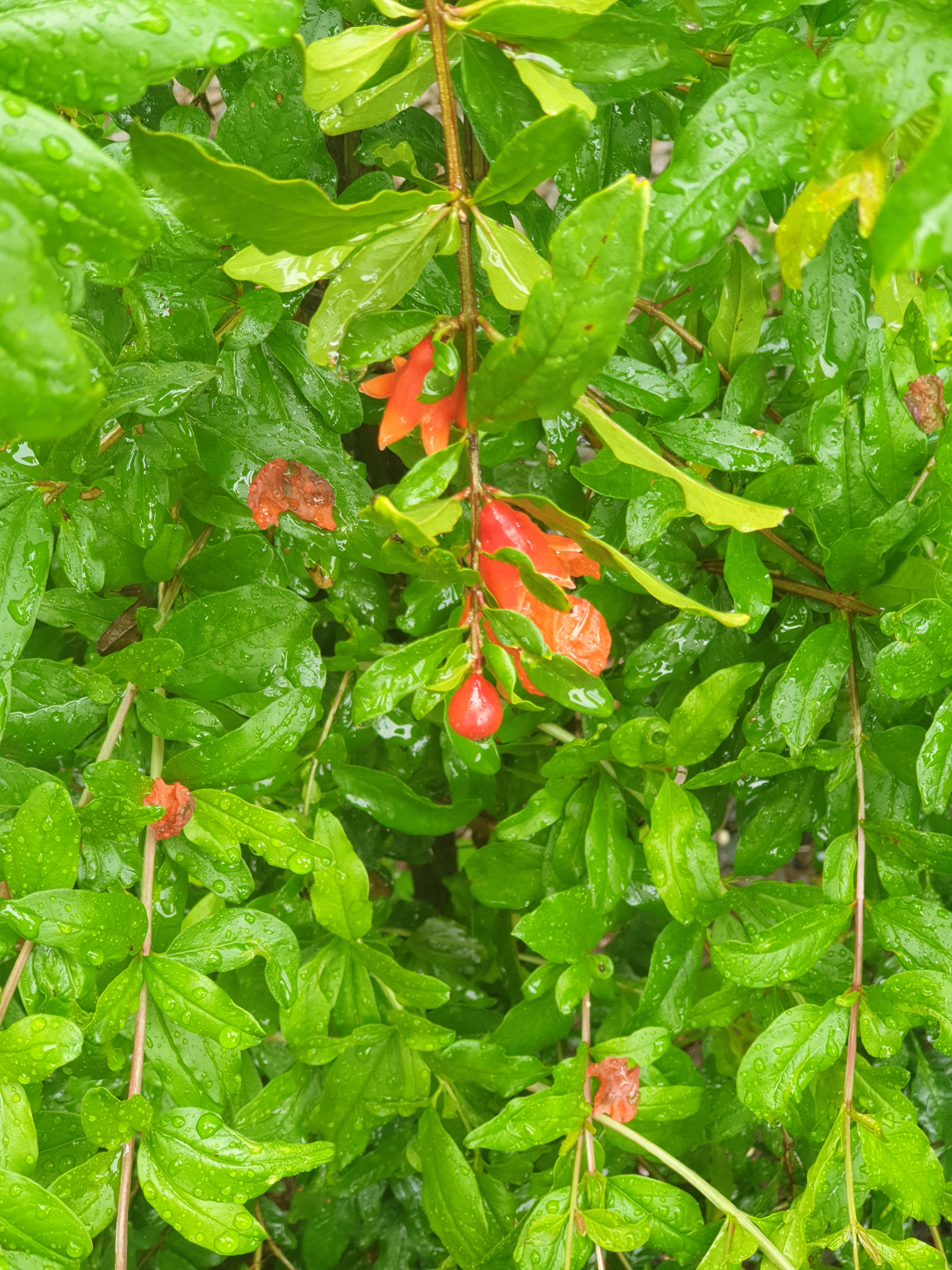
Pomegranate in Chittar

== See also ==
- Angamoozhy
- Plappally
- Ranni
- Vayyattupuzha
- Vadaserikara
- Maniyar
- Nilakkal
- Konni
