= Adavi, Kerala =

Eco-tourism destination in Kerala, India

Adavi Eco Tourism
- Konni - Adavi Eco Tourism
- അടവി ഇക്കോ ടൂറിസം (Malayalam)
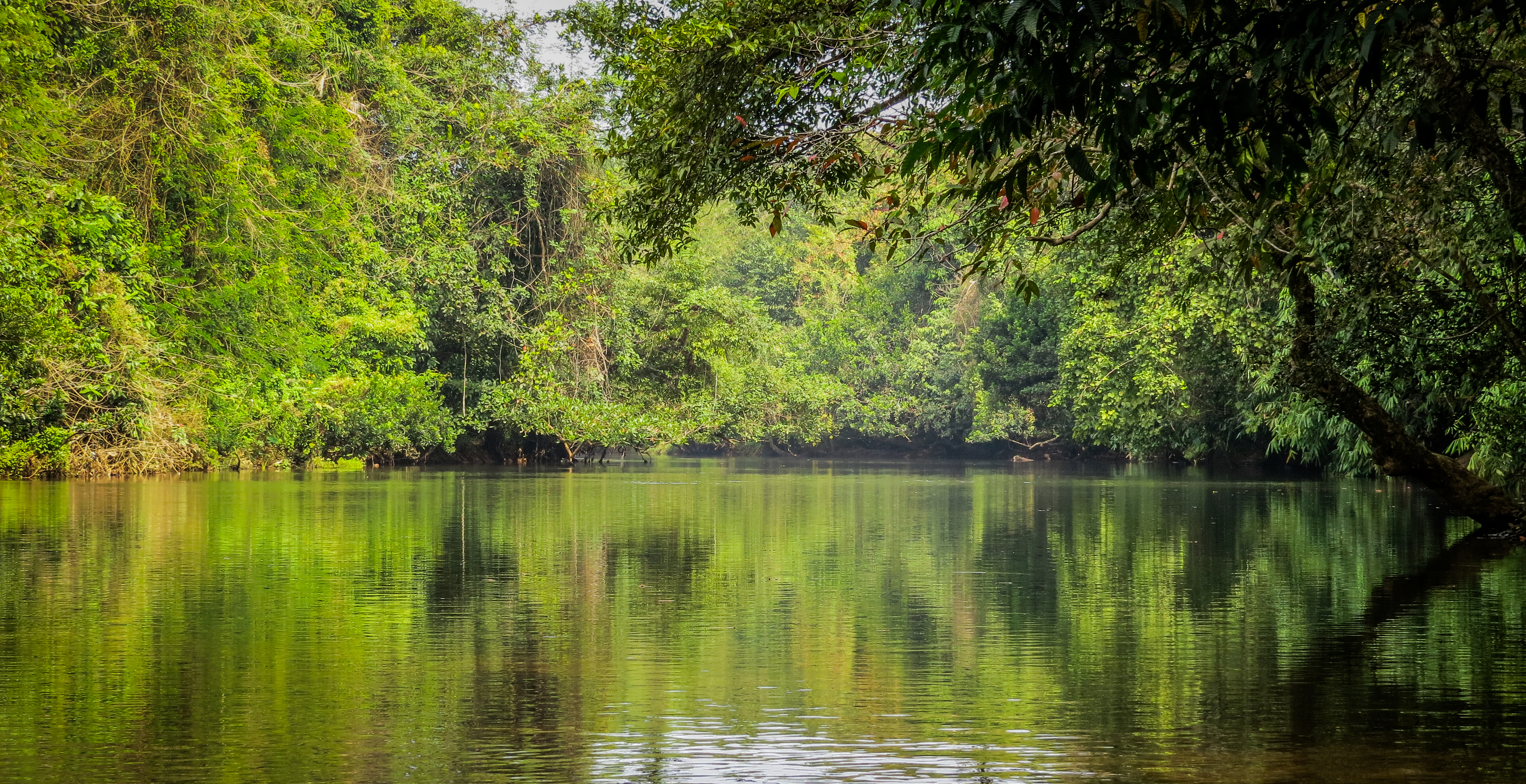
- Kallar river at Adavi

- Location within Kerala Location within India
- Type: Ecotourism
- Location: Pathanamthitta, Kerala
- Nearest town: Thannithode
- Coordinates: 9.2644°N 76.9355°E
- Administrator: Kerala Tourism Development Corporation; Kerala Forest and Wildlife Department
- Open: 08:30 AM - 05:30 PM
- Status: Open
- Parking: Available
- Public transit: Mundommoozhy; 250 m (820 ft)
- Nearest airport: Thiruvananthapuram; 125 km (78 mi)
- Facilities: Bowl boat ride Jeep safari Bus tour Tree top bamboo hut
- Website: Official website

Adavi is a major tourist destination in Konni, Kerala, situated in the banks of Kallar river. Eco-tourism project in Adavi is jointly launched by Kerala Tourism Development Corporation and Department of Forests and Wildlife, Kerala.

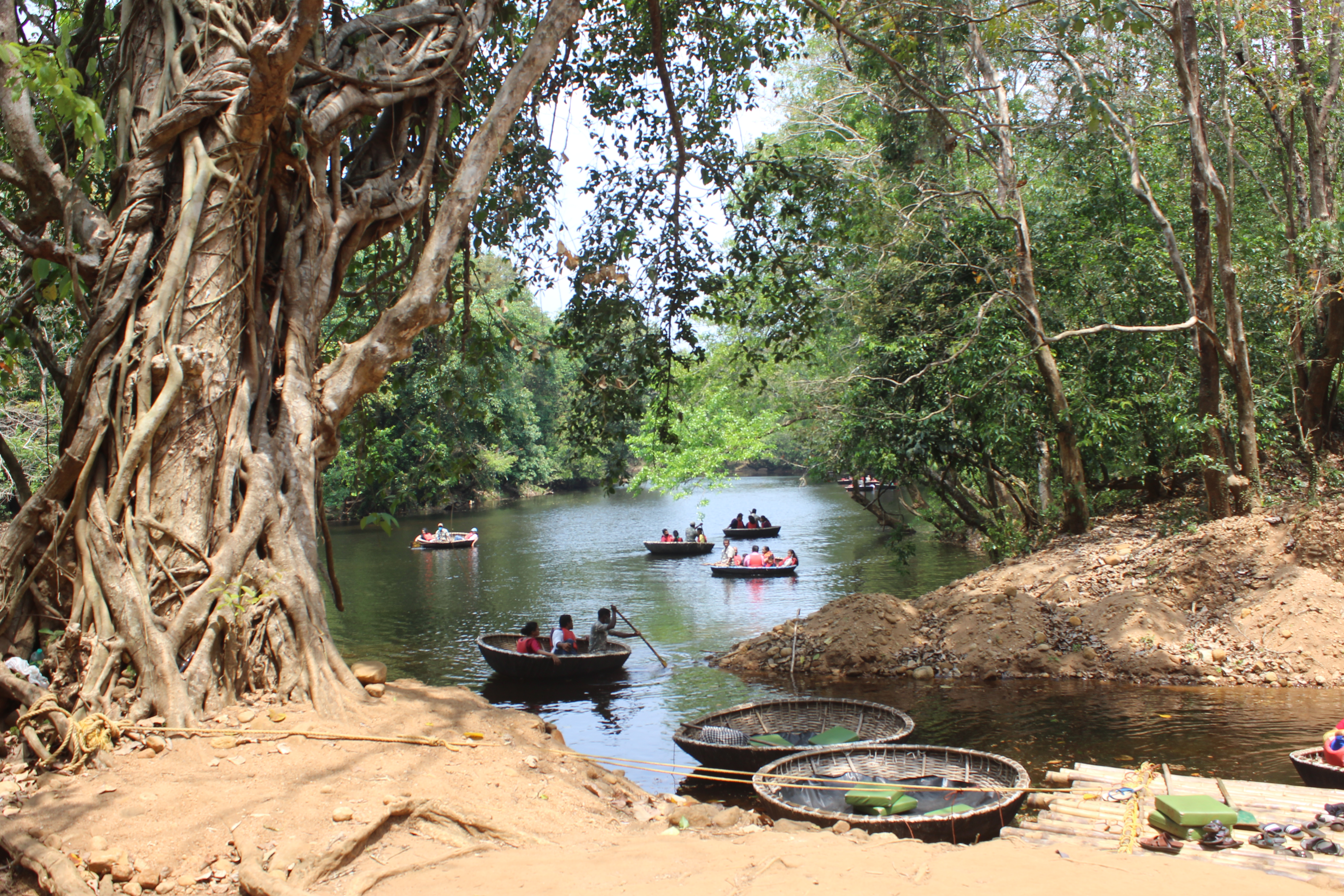
Coracle riding at Adavi Eco Tourism

The main attraction in Adavi is Coracle riding and Bamboo huts, which are erected on the banks of Kallar river.
