= St. Thomas Ecumenical Church, Nilackal =

Ecumenical church in Kerala, India

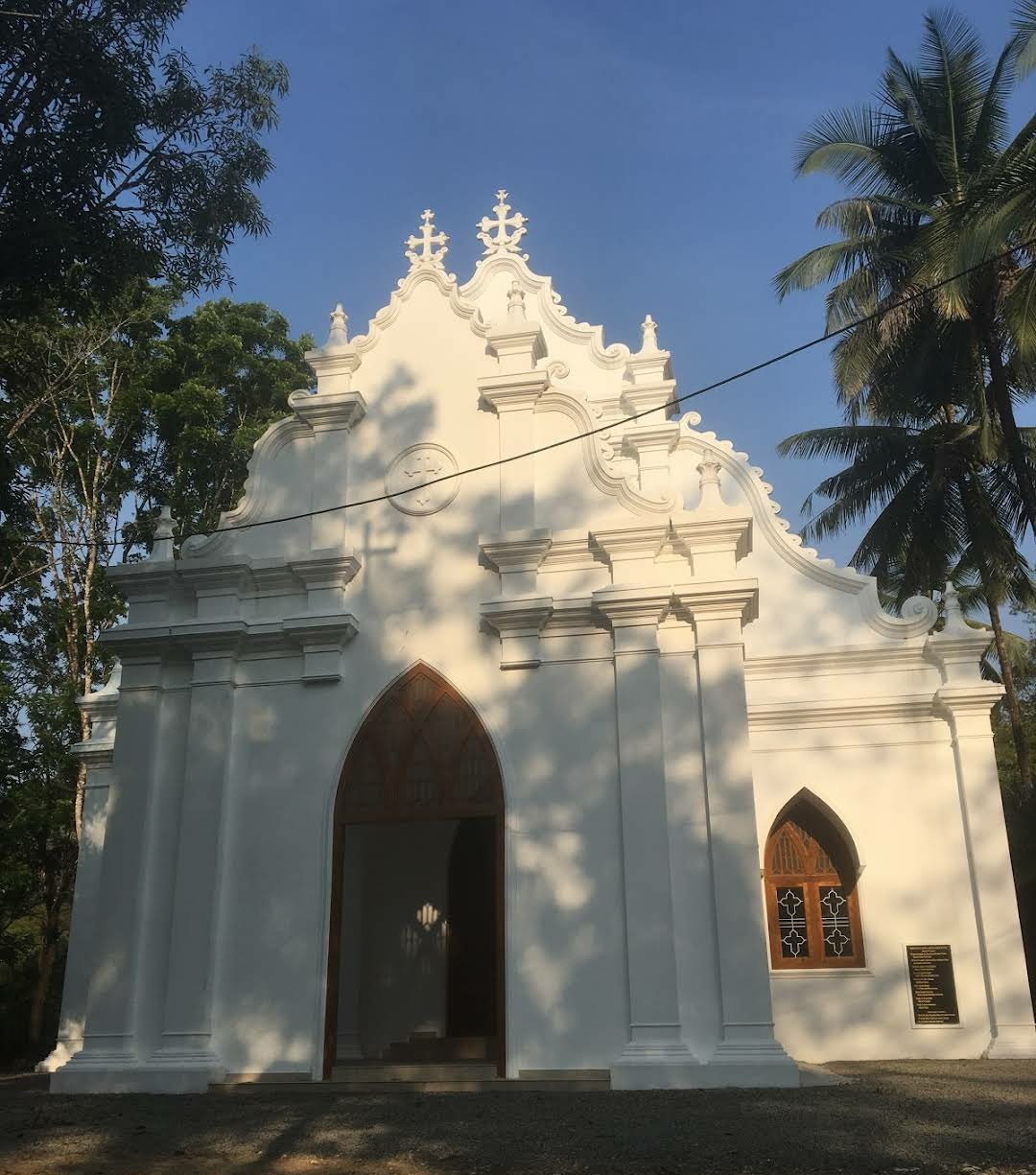
- St. Thomas Ecumenical Church, Nilackal

Religion
- Affiliation: Christianity
- District: Pathanamthitta
- Ecclesiastical or organisational status: Independent Ecumenical church
- Leadership: Various Episcopal Churches
- Year consecrated: 1985 AD

Location
- Location: Angamoozhy, Kerala, India
- State: Kerala
- Interactive map of St. Thomas Ecumenical Church, Nilackal
- Coordinates: 9°22′27″N 77°00′07″E

Architecture
- Type: Mix of Kerala and Persian
- Completed: 1985

Nilakkal St. Thomas Ecumenical Church is an ecumenical Christian church located in Angamoozhy, Kerala, India. It is traditionally regarded as the modern successor to one of the Ezharappallikal (seven and a half churches) believed to have been originally established by St. Thomas in the 1st century AD.

The modern structure was completed and consecrated in 1985 as the first ecumenical church of its kind, functioning as a shared place of worship managed by various Episcopal denominations in India.

== History ==
=== Ancient origins and trade ===
Nilakkal, historically known as Chayal, is located in a dense forest area that was once a flourishing trade hub. The settlement served as a vital passage connecting the Chera Kingdom with the Pandyan Kingdom, facilitating extensive commerce with Madurai and Thirunelveli. According to local tradition, early written records, and ancient copper plates, St. Thomas founded a church here during his apostolic mission to Malabar.

In the 2nd century AD, following periods of regional persecution, Christian converts of Tamil Brahmin, Vellalar, and Chettiar backgrounds from the Coromandel Coast (including Mylapore and Kayalpattanam) migrated to Nilakkal and Kollam, blending into the local Syrian Christian community. Between the 2nd and 8th centuries, segments of the Christian population further migrated deeper into inland Kerala, establishing settlements in Kadampanad, Adoor, Thumpamon, and Chengannur.

=== Decline and destruction ===
By the 10th century, the Pandalam and Poonjar dynasties branched off from the Pandyan Kingdom, with Nilakkal falling under the territory of Pandalam. The city's decline began in the early 12th century when Maravarman Kulasekara Pandyan I conquered Quilon. Due to its strategic position on the trade route, Nilakkal became a target for frequent military raids and plunder by bandits.

The settlement faced severe crises during the Second Pandyan Civil War and the early 14th-century southern expedition of the Delhi Sultanate led by General Malik Kafur. The city was eventually plundered and burned, resulting in the destruction of the original ancient church. Following this collapse, the remaining Syrian Christian population migrated to safer regions, including Kanjirappally, Poonjar, Aruvithura, Ranni, Vadasserikara, Vaipur, Erumeli, and parts of Meenachil. The Great Flood of 1341 further altered the local geography, completely submerging what remained of the historic settlement.

=== Modern reconstruction ===
The historic church was later symbolically revived and reconstructed in Angamoozhy, approximately 3 kilometres (1.9 mi) from the historic site of Nilakkal. It is situated about 52 kilometres (32 mi) east of Ranni in the Pathanamthitta district. Consecrated in 1985, the modern church stands as a monument to Christian unity and heritage in Kerala.

== Member denominations ==
The church operates as an independent ecumenical body and is jointly maintained by the following episcopal Christian denominations in India:

- Malankara Orthodox Syrian Church
- Malankara Jacobite Syrian Orthodox Church
- Malabar Independent Syrian Church
- Knanaya Jacobite Syrian Archdiocese
- Malankara Mar Thoma Syrian Church
- Syro-Malabar Catholic Church
- Syro-Malankara Catholic Church
- Church of South India (Madhya Kerala Diocese)

== Administration and leadership ==
Nilakkal Ecumenical Trust Committee Leadership
Position	Name	Ecclesiastical Title / Affiliation
Chairman & Managing Trustee	Most Rev. Dr. Theodosius Mar Thoma Metropolitan	Primate of the Malankara Mar Thoma Syrian Church
Vice Chairman & Managing Trustee	H.G. Dr. Samuel Mar Irenios Metropolitan	Archbishop of the Syro-Malankara Catholic Eparchy of Pathanamthitta
Secretary & Managing Trustee	Rt. Rev. Dr. Bishop Sabu Koshy Cheriyan	Bishop of the Church of South India (Madhya Kerala Diocese)
Treasurer	Abraham Ittycheria	
Administrator	Fr. Shaiju Mathew OIC	Syro-Malankara Catholic Church
