= Vadasserikara =

Vadasserikara Vadaseri illam
- Town
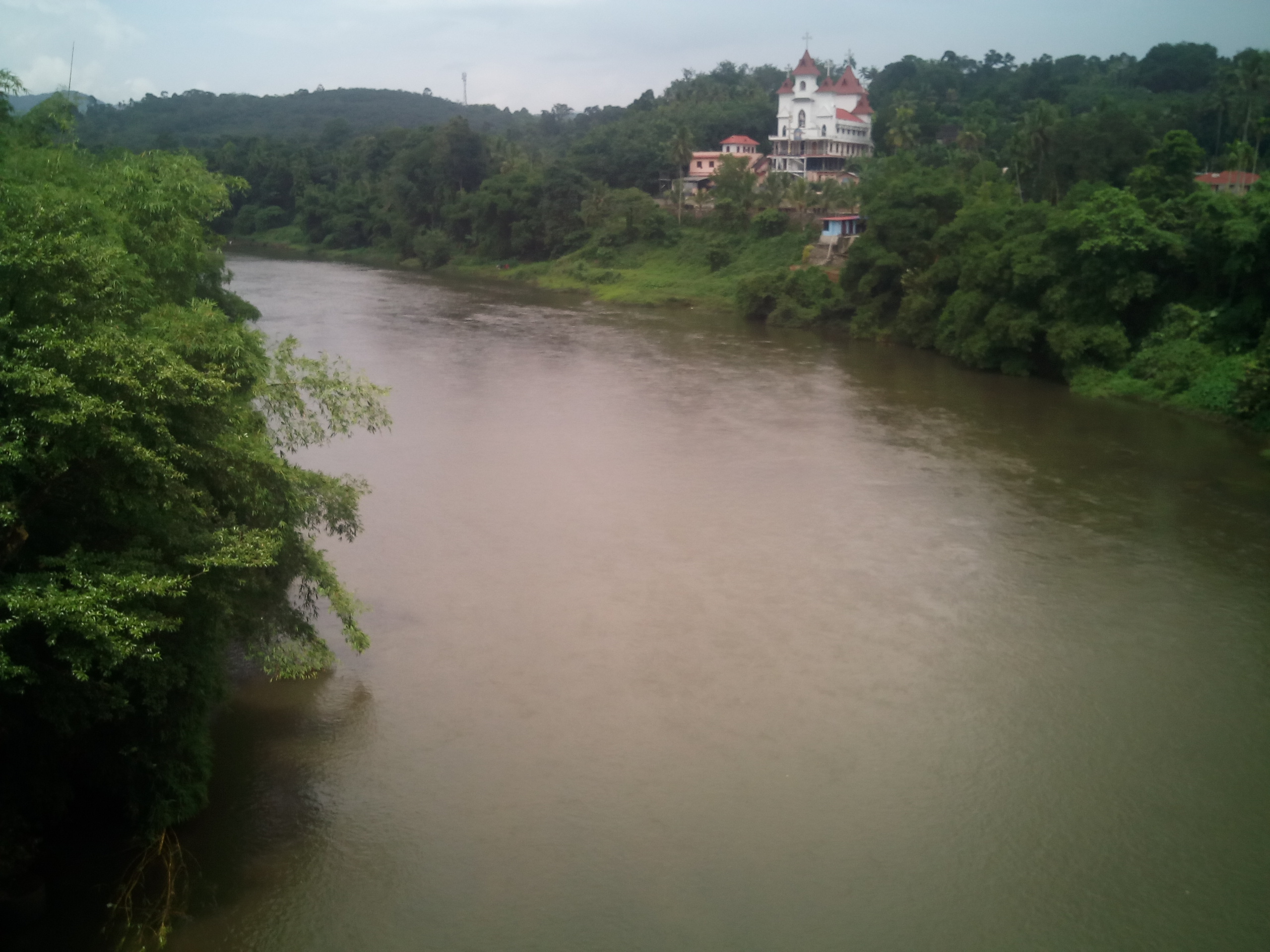
- View of Pamba river from Vadasserikkara new bridge

- Location in Kerala, India Vadasserikara (India)
- Coordinates: 9°20′15″N 76°49′40″E
- Country: India
- State: Kerala
- District: Pathanamthitta

Government
  - Type: Democratic
  - Body: Vadasserikkara grama panchayath

Area
  - Total: 60.07 km^{2} (23.19 sq mi)

Population (2001)
  - Total: 22,577
  - Density: 375.8/km^{2} (973.4/sq mi)

Languages
  - Official: Malayalam, English
- Time zone: UTC+5:30 (IST)
- PIN: 689662
- Telephone code: 04735
- Vehicle registration: KL-03, KL-62
- Lok Sabha constituency: Pathanamthitta

Vadaserikara is a village in Thiruvalla Revenue Division of Pathanamthitta district, in the state of Kerala, India. It is one of the 11 villages in Ranni taluk with an area of 6007 hectares. The nearest railway station is Thiruvalla located at a distance of 33 km (21 mi) and sits at the confluence of the Pamba and Kallar River.

The village is located on the main trunk road to Sabarimala–the Pathanamthitta-Pampa Highway and is a stopover for pilgrims on the way to Sabarimala, the abode of Lord Ayyappa, a pilgrim centre that attracts millions of Ayyappa devotees. It lies 3 kilometres (1.9 mi) from Kumplampoika and about 8 kilometres (5.0 mi) from Ranni. The Pathanamthitta-Seethathodu road also pass through Vadasserikkara.

Marthoma Christians and Orthodox form the majority of the population. The village has seen much growth since the 1990s. One of the biggest bridges in the district is at Benglavkadavu.

== Demographics ==
As of the 2001 India census, Vadaserikara had a population of 22,580 with 11,082 males and 11,498 females.

== Electricity supply ==
33kV Substation, Perunad

== See also ==
- Angamoozhy
- Ranni
- Chittar
- Pathanamthitta
