= Plappally =

- Settlement
- Location in Kerala, India
- Coordinates: 9°22′49.43″N 76°55′52.6″E
- Country: India
- State: Kerala
- District: Pathanamthitta

Government
  - Type: Panchayath
  - Body: Ranni - Perunad panchayath
- Elevation: 354 m (1,161 ft)

Languages
  - Official: Malayalam, English
- Time zone: UTC+5:30 (IST)
- PIN: 689662
- Area code: 04735
- Vehicle registration: KL-62, KL-03
- Coastline: 0 kilometres (0 mi)
- Nearest cities: Chittar, Angamoozhy
- Lok Sabha constituency: Pathanamthitta
- Climate: Moderate Climate (Köppen)
- Avg. summer temperature: 35 °C (95 °F)
- Avg. winter temperature: 20 °C (68 °F)

Plappally is a settlement located in the Goodrical range of the Ranni Forest Division in the state of Kerala, India. The place is an intersection point of Mannarakulanji–Chalakkayam state highway (NH-183) and Erumely–Thulappally–Plappally route. There is a forest station in Plappally under the Kerala State Forest and Wildlife Department.

Plappally derives its name from a family named Plappally as pronounced and proclaimed by Chembakasssery Raja. It is said that a location in the Goodrical range of Ranni forest division in the state of Kerala, India was where this family stayed. Around the 1790s this family migrated to regions near to the backwaters of Kerala. Parts of this family resides and takes care of their deity the Devi temple in Plappally and Thevar at Kottayam.
