= List of rivers of Kerala =

There are 44 major rivers in Kerala, all but three originating in the Western Ghats, with 41 flowing westward and three eastward. The rivers of Kerala are small, in terms of length, breadth and water discharge. The rivers flow faster, owing to the hilly terrain and as the short distance between the Western Ghats and the sea. All the rivers are entirely monsoon-fed and half of them shrink into rivulets or dry up completely during summer but the major rivers flow perennial and plays an important role in the landscape of Kerala.

== Features ==
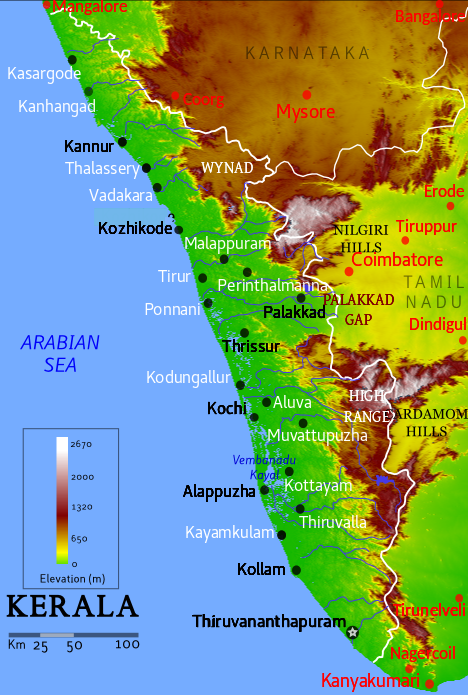
Topography of Kerala

Kerala is wedged between the Lakshadweep Sea and the Western Ghats. Geographically, the state can be divided into three climatically distinct regions: the eastern highlands; rugged and cool mountainous terrain, the central mid-lands; rolling hills, and the western lowlands; coastal plains. The eastern region of Kerala consists of high mountains, gorges and deep-cut valleys immediately west of the Western Ghats' rain shadow. Forty-one of Kerala's west-flowing rivers, and three of its east-flowing ones originate in this region. The 41 west-flowing rivers, each of which having at least a length of 15 km, gradually slopes towards the Arabian Sea coast in the western region and empty either into backwaters or Arabian Sea there. The longer rivers have several tributaries and streams too. The Western Ghats form a wall of mountains interrupted only near Palakkad; hence also known Palghat, where the Palakkad Gap breaks. The river Bharathappuzha flows through the Palakkad Gap. The three east-flowing rivers also originate in Western Ghats, but flow eastwards either into Karnataka or Tamil Nadu.

Kerala's western coastal belt is relatively flat compared to the eastern region, and is criss-crossed by a network of interconnected brackish canals, lakes, estuaries, and rivers known as the Kerala Backwaters. Kuttanad, also known as The Rice Bowl of Kerala, has the lowest altitude in India, and is also one of the few places in world where cultivation takes place below sea level. The country's longest lake Vembanad, dominates the backwaters; it lies between Alappuzha and Kochi and is about 200 km^{2} (77 sq mi) in area. Around eight percent of India's waterways are found in Kerala. Kerala's 44 rivers include the Periyar; 244 kilometres (152 mi), Bharathapuzha; 209 kilometres (130 mi), Pamba; 176 kilometres (109 mi), Chaliyar; 169 kilometres (105 mi), Chalakudypuzha; 145.5 kilometres (90 mi), Kadalundipuzha; 130 kilometres (81 mi), Valapattanam; 129 kilometres (80 mi) and the Achankovil River; 128 kilometres (80 mi). The average length of the rivers is 64 kilometres (40 mi). Many of the rivers are small and entirely fed by monsoon rain. As Kerala's rivers are small and lacking in delta, they are more prone to environmental effects. The rivers face problems such as sand mining and pollution.

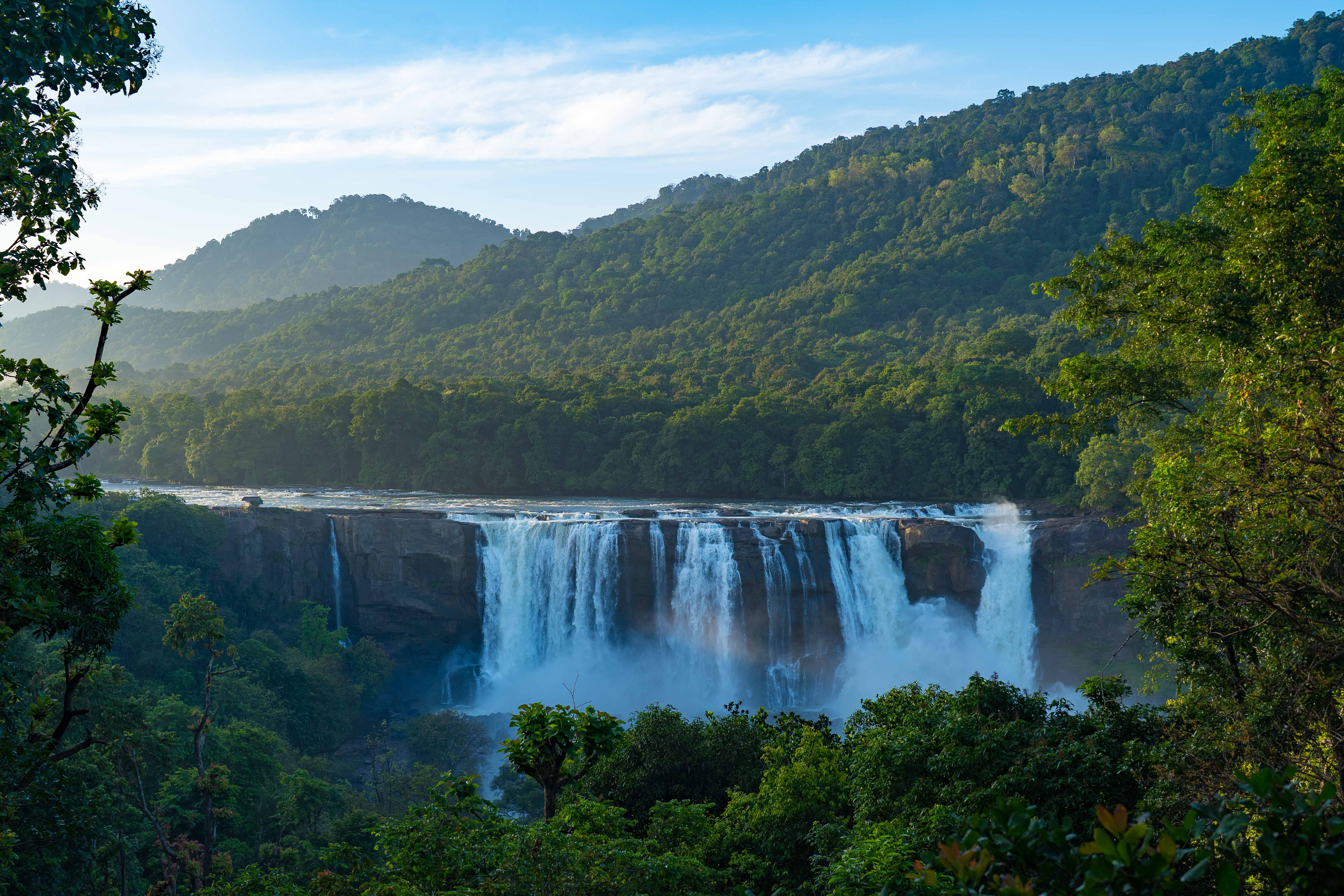
The famous Athirapally Falls which sits on the Chalakudy River is an example for a river that transitions from the Mountainous Highlands to the Plainer Midlands via rapids and waterfalls

== West flowing rivers ==
This is a list of the westward-flowing rivers of Kerala state in southern India, in order of length, and their tributaries. These rivers all originate in the Western Ghats range and flow westward into the Kerala Backwaters or into the Arabian Sea. Length in kilometers is in parentheses. Kasaragod district have the maximum number of west-flowing rivers in Kerala - 12.

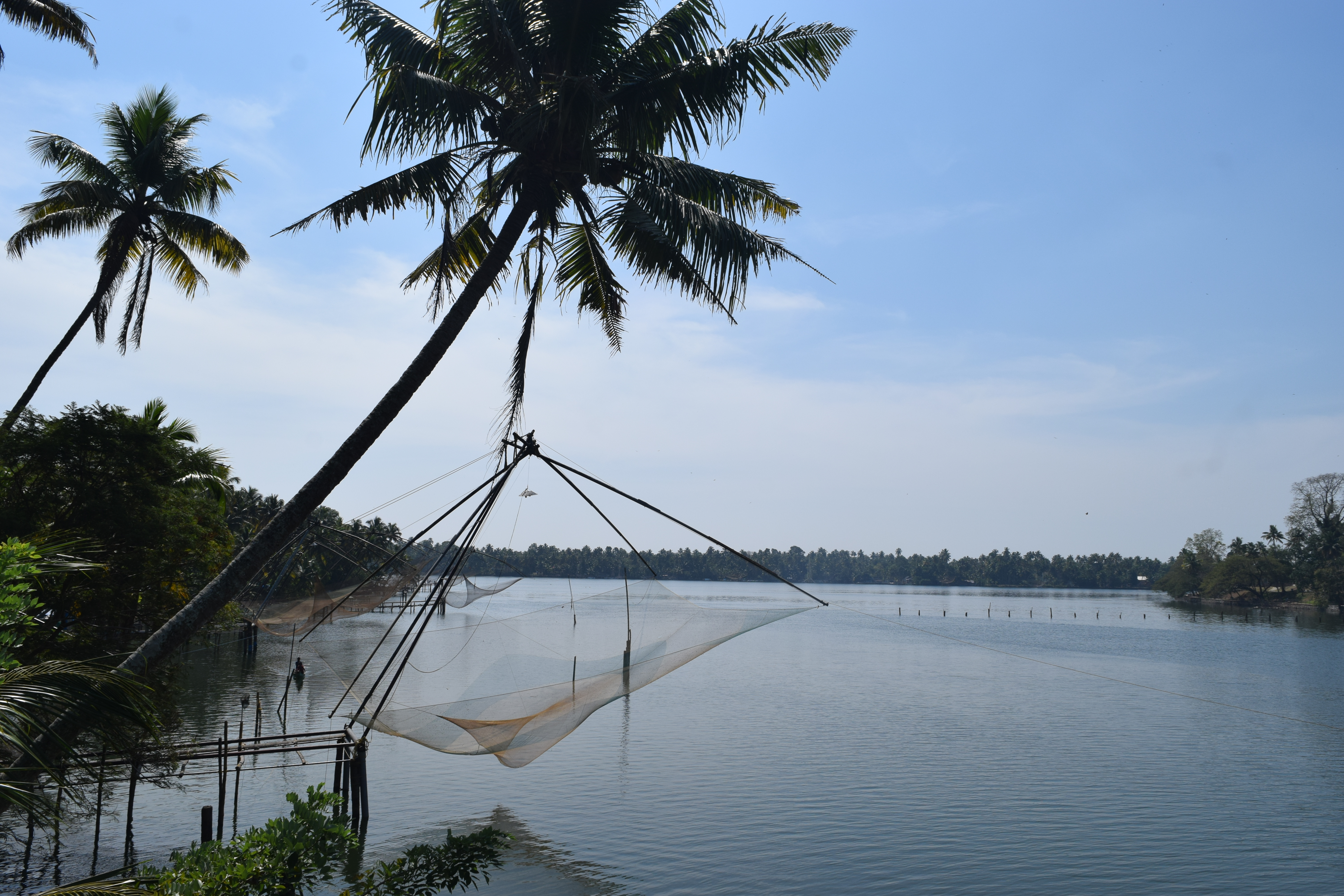
The 244 km long Periyar, known as Choorni in ancient period, is the longest river in Kerala.

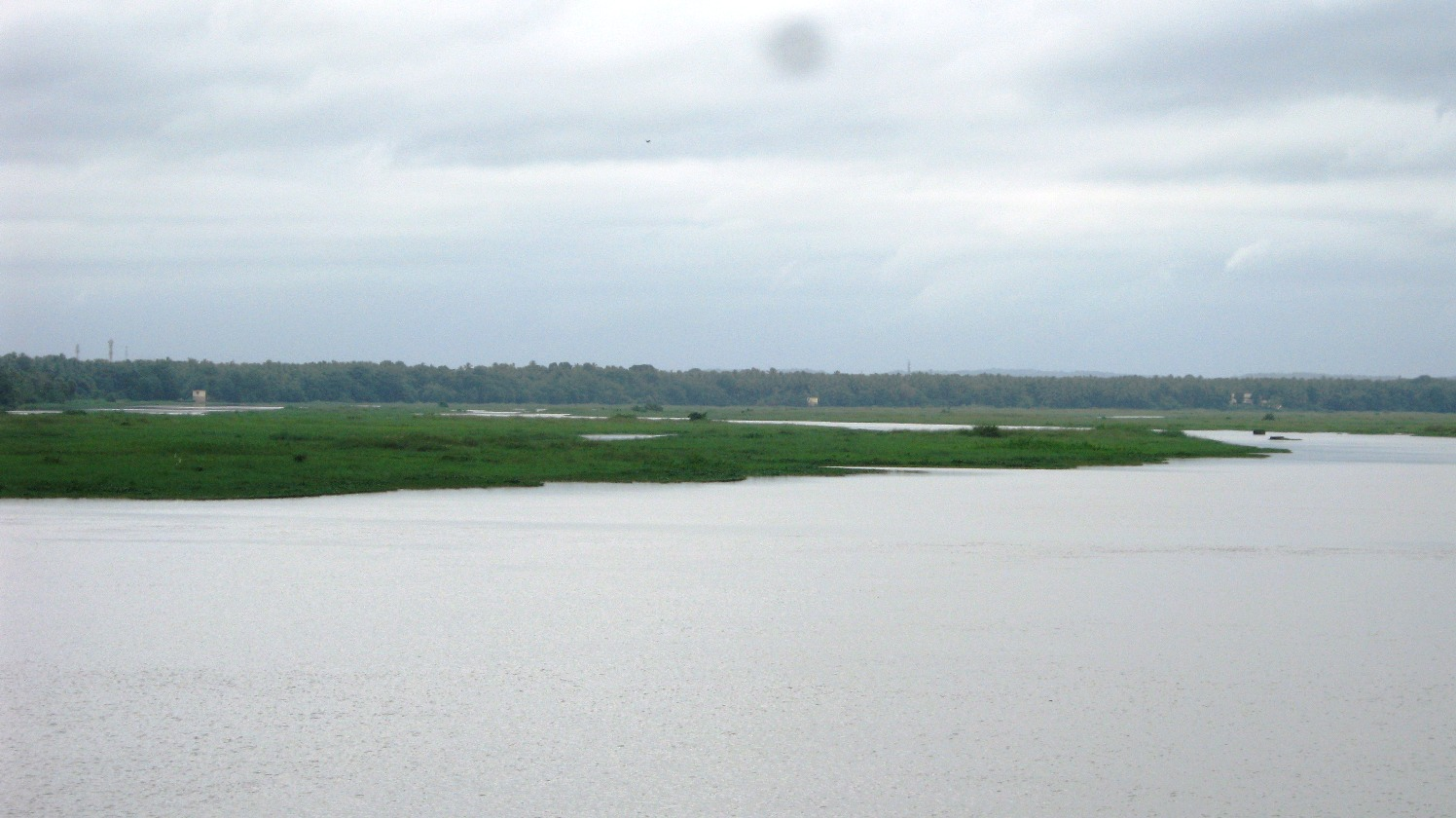
Bharathappuzha, the second-longest river of Kerala of which 209 km flows through Kerala, has played a major role in shaping the Culture of Kerala.

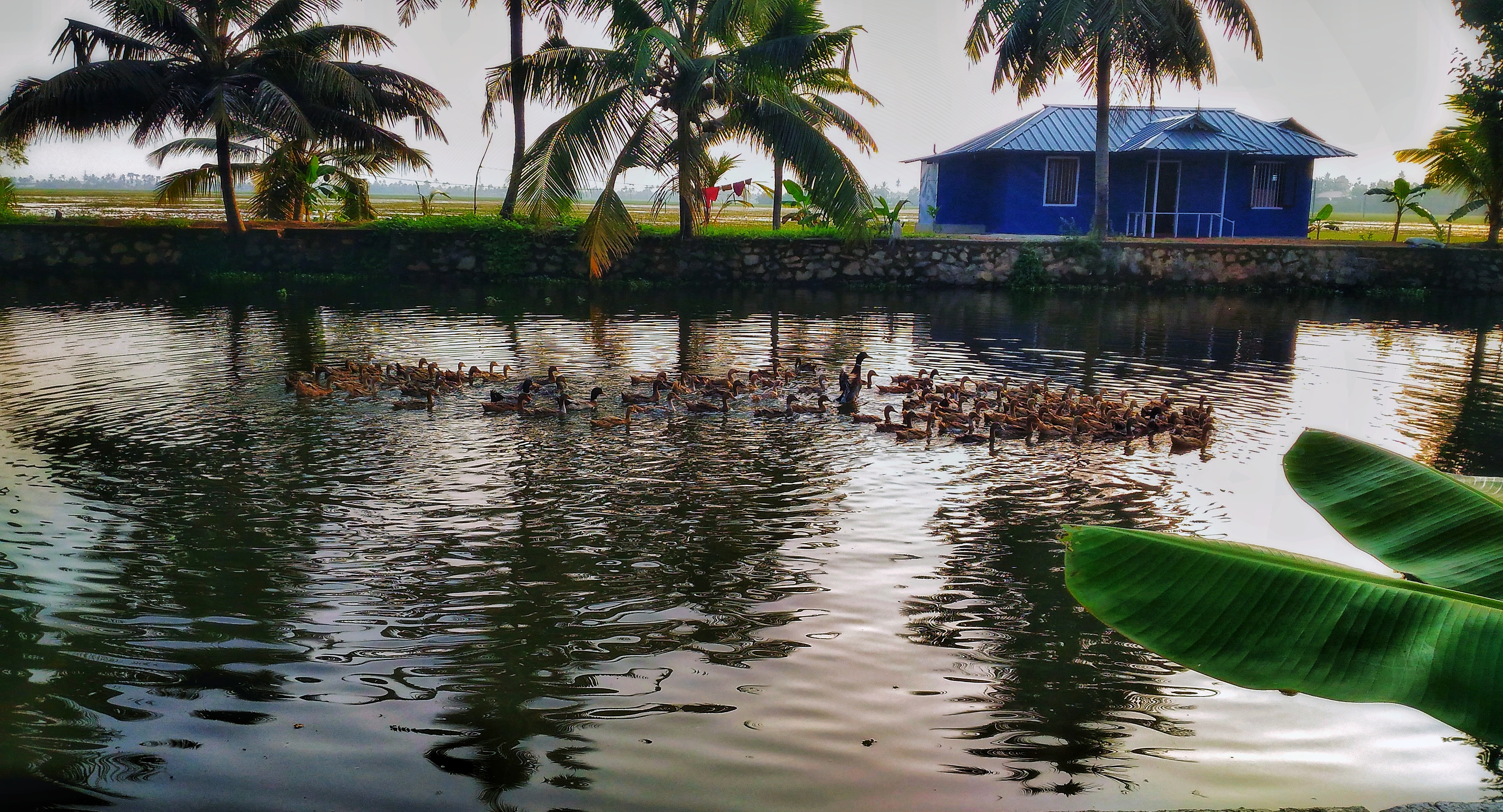
Kuttanad, the region having least altitude in India, is located on the bank of river Pamba, which is the third-longest river of Kerala with a length of 176 km.

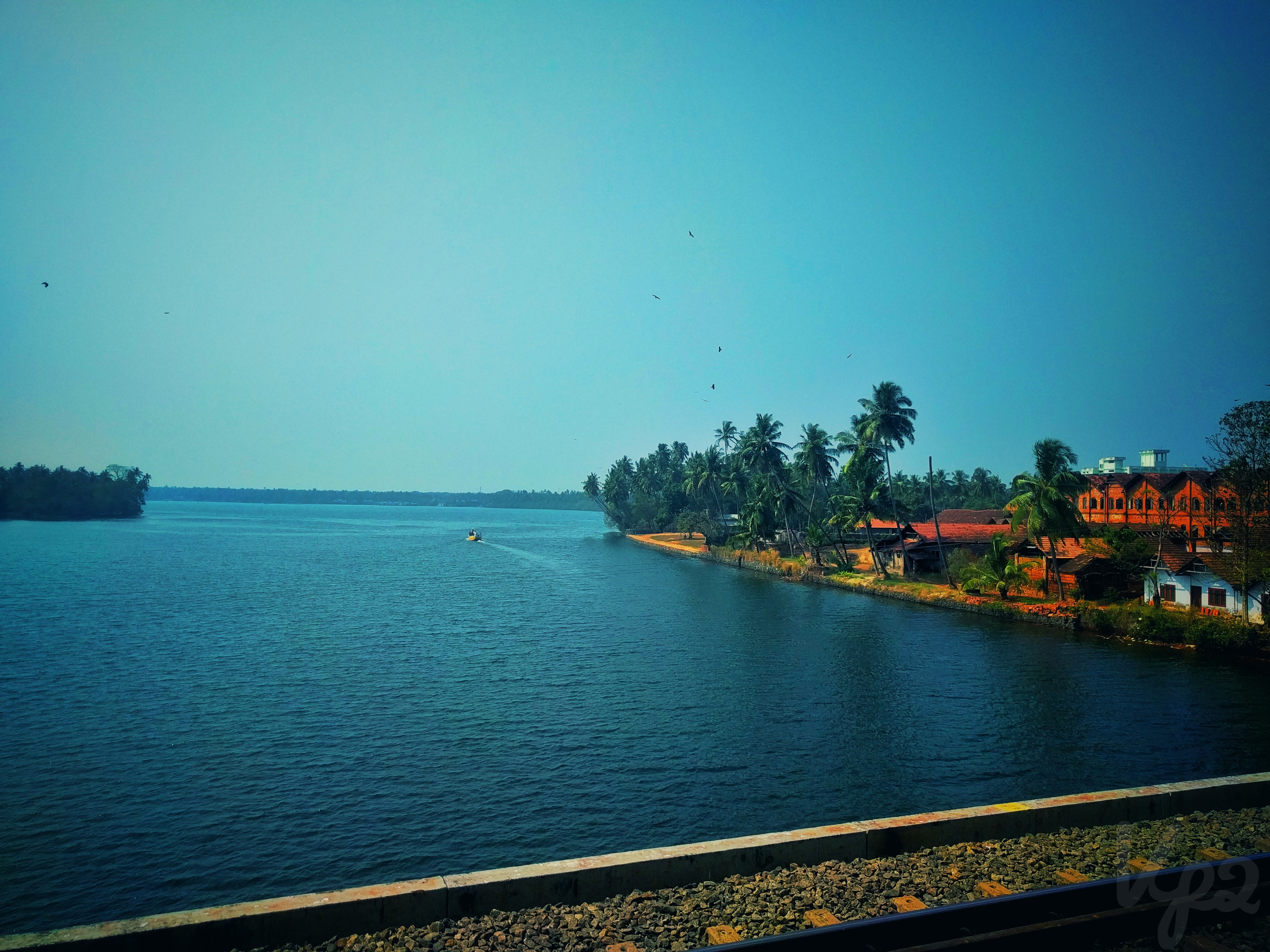
The oldest Teak plantation of the world at Nilambur is situated on the bank of Chaliyar, the fourth-longest river of Kerala (169 km).

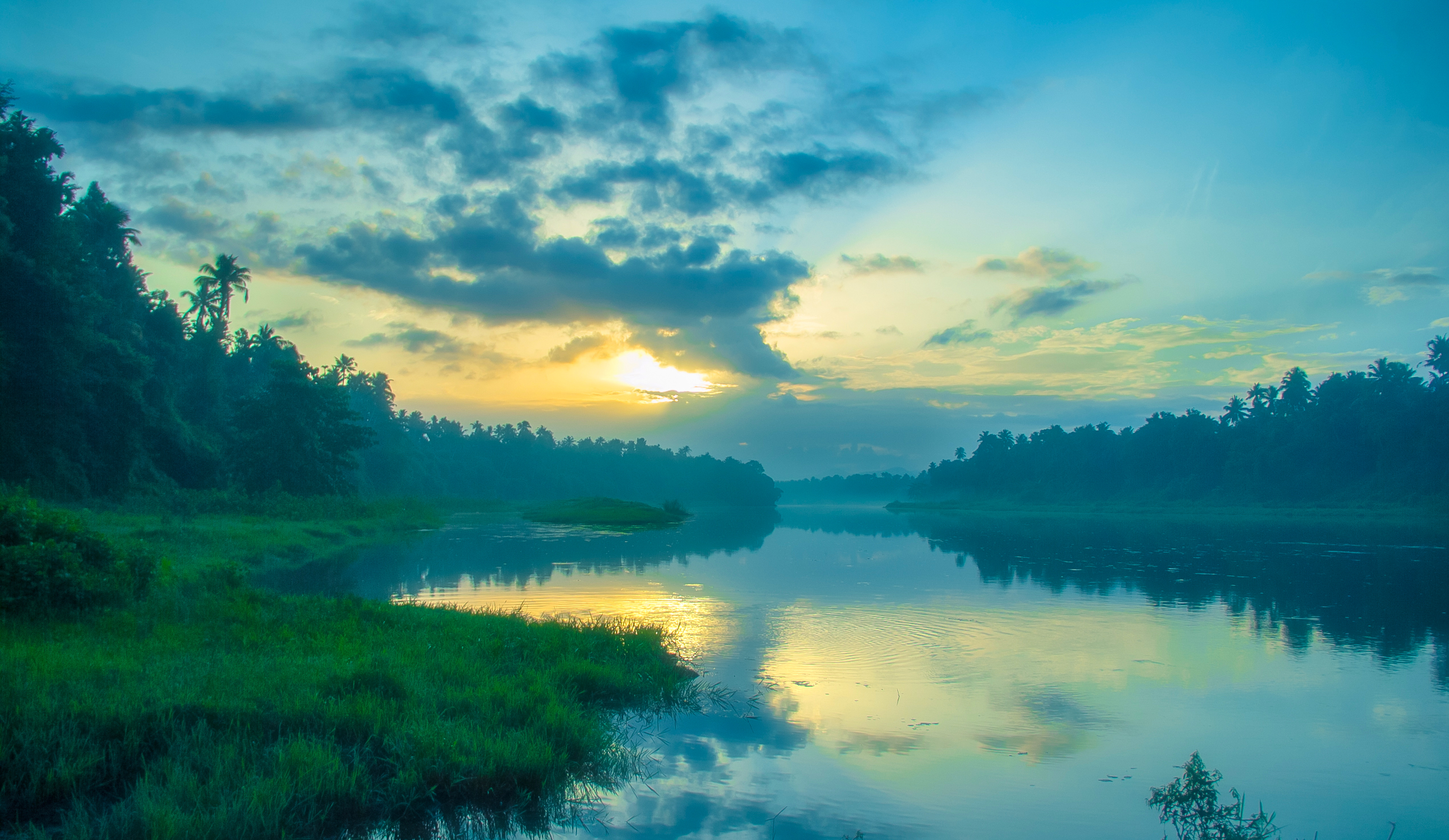
The famous Athirappilly Falls is situated on the 145.5 km long Chalakudy River.

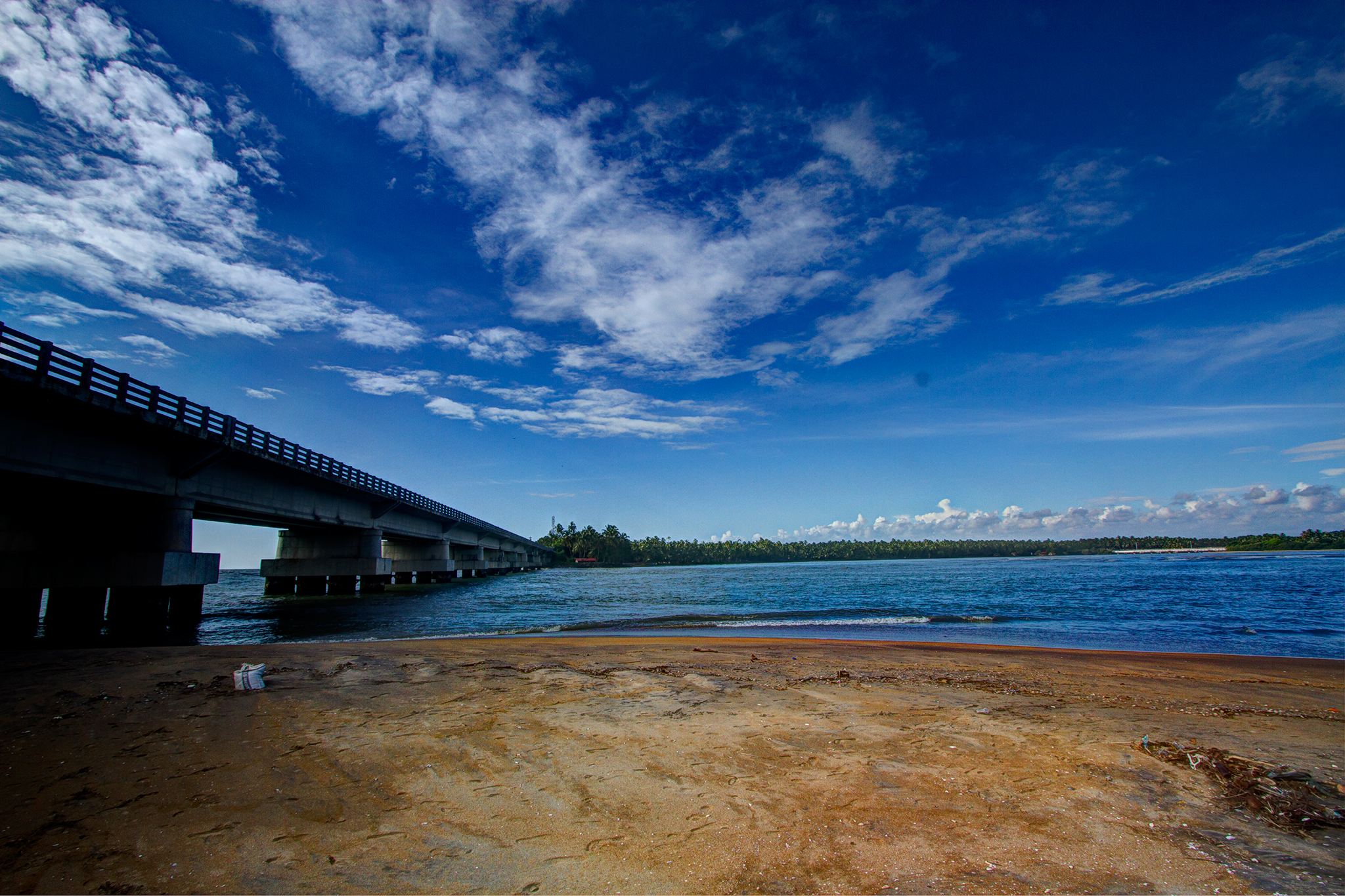
The 130 km long Kadalundi River, which empties into the sea near Kadalundi Bird Sanctuary, is the sixth-longest river in Kerala.

1. Periyar River (244)
  1. Edamala River
  2. Cheruthoni River
  3. Mullayar River
  4. Muthirapuzha River
  5. Perinjankutti River
  6. Ambazhachal River
  7. Kaniyampuzha River
  8. Muttar River
  9. Panniyar
2. Bharatapuzha River (209)
  1. Thuthapuzha River
  2. Kanjirappuzha
  3. Gayathripuzha River
  4. Kalpathipuzha River
  5. Kannadipuzha River
3. Pamba River (176)
  1. Azhuthayar
  2. Kakkiyar
  3. Kakkattar
  4. Kallar
  5. Perunthenaruvi
  6. Madatharuvi
  7. Thanungattilthodu
  8. Kozhithodu
  9. Varattar
  10. Utharappalli River
  11. Kuttemperoor
4. Chaliyar River (169)
  1. Cherupuzha (Mavoor)
  2. Iruvanjippuzha
  3. Thottumukkam River
  4. Kuthirappuzha
  5. Kuruvanpuzha
  6. Karimpuzha
  7. Pandippuzha
  8. Neerppuzha
5. Chalakudy River (145)
  1. Parambikulam River
6. Kadalundy River (130)
7. Achankoil River (128)
  1. Utharappalli River
8. Kallada River (121)
9. Muvattupuzha River (121)
  1. Thodupuzha River
  2. Kothayar River
  3. Kaliyar River
  4. Kariyar River
  5. Thevalakkadu River
  6. Uzhavoor River
10. Valapattanam River (110)
  1. Bavali River
  2. Sreekandapuram River
  3. Payyavoor River
  4. Mundayapuzha River
  5. Veni River
  6. Aralam River
  7. Thayikkundam River
11. Chandragiri River (105)
  1. Kudumbur River
12. Manimala River (90)
13. Vamanapuram River (88)
14. Kuppam River (88)
  1. Kuttikol River
15. Meenachil River (78)
  1. Meenachal River
  2. Kodoor River
  3. Karapuzha River
  4. Pulinackal River
  5. Moorkankavu River
16. Kuttiyadi River (74)
17. Karamana River (68)
  1. Killiyar
18. Shiriya River (68)
19. Kariangode River (64)
  1. Chaithravahini River
20. Ithikkara River (56)
21. Neyyar River (56)
22. Mahe River (54)
  1. Mundathode River
23. Keecheri River (51)
24. Perumba River (51)
  1. Vayalapra River
25. Uppala River (50)
26. Karuvannur River (48)
  1. Kurumali River
  2. Manali River
27. Anjarakandy River (48)
28. Tirur River (48)
29. Neeleshwaram River (46)
30. Pallikkal River (42)
31. Kallayi River (40)
32. Korapuzha River (40)
33. Mogral River (34)
34. Kavvayi River (31)
  1. Kankol
  2. Vannathichal
  3. Kuppithodu
  4. Kuniyan
35. Thanikkudam River (29)
36. Thalassery River (28)
  1. Ummanchira River
37. Mamam river (27)
38. Chithari River (25)
39. Ramapuram River (19)
40. Ayiroor River (17)
41. Manjeswaram River (16)

== East flowing rivers ==
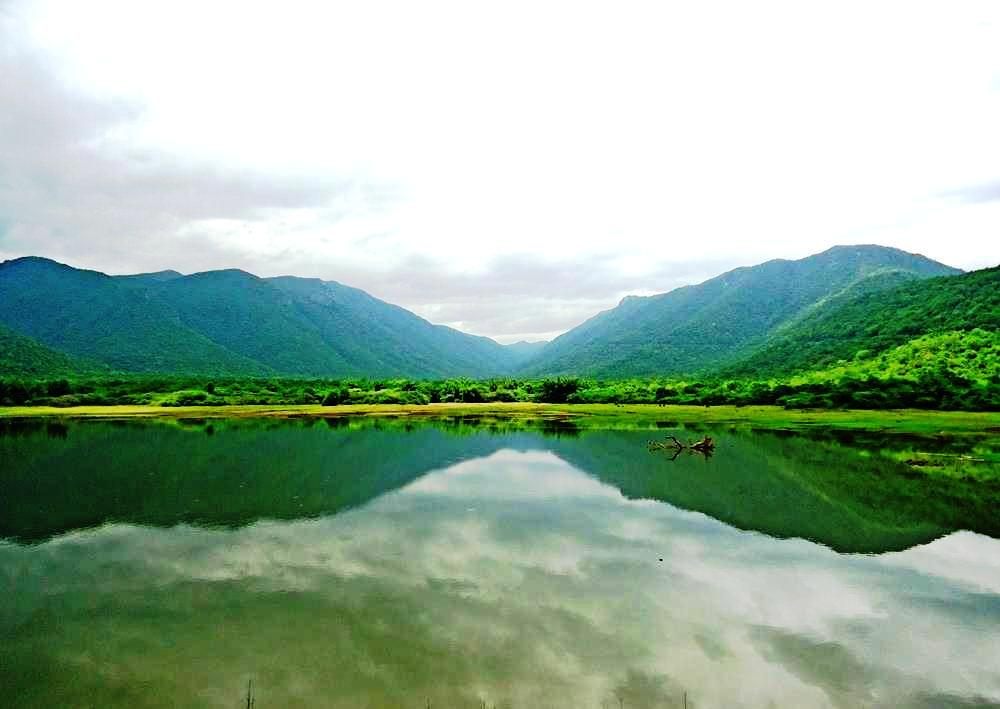
The east-flowing Bhavani River flows near Silent Valley National Park.

There are three rivers that rise in Kerala and flow eastwards, Kabani into Karnataka and the other two into Tamil Nadu. All the three rivers ultimately join the Kaveri river.

1. Kabani (57)
2. Bhavani (38)
3. Pambar (25)

== See also ==
- List of dams and reservoirs in Kerala
- List of mountains in Kerala
- Kerala backwaters

== Notes ==
- Chandran, VP (2018). Mathrubhumi Yearbook Plus - 2019 (Malayalam ed.). Kozhikode: P. V. Chandran, Managing Editor, Mathrubhumi Printing & Publishing Company Limited, Kozhikode.
