= Perunthenaruvi Weir =

Diversion dam in Kerala, India

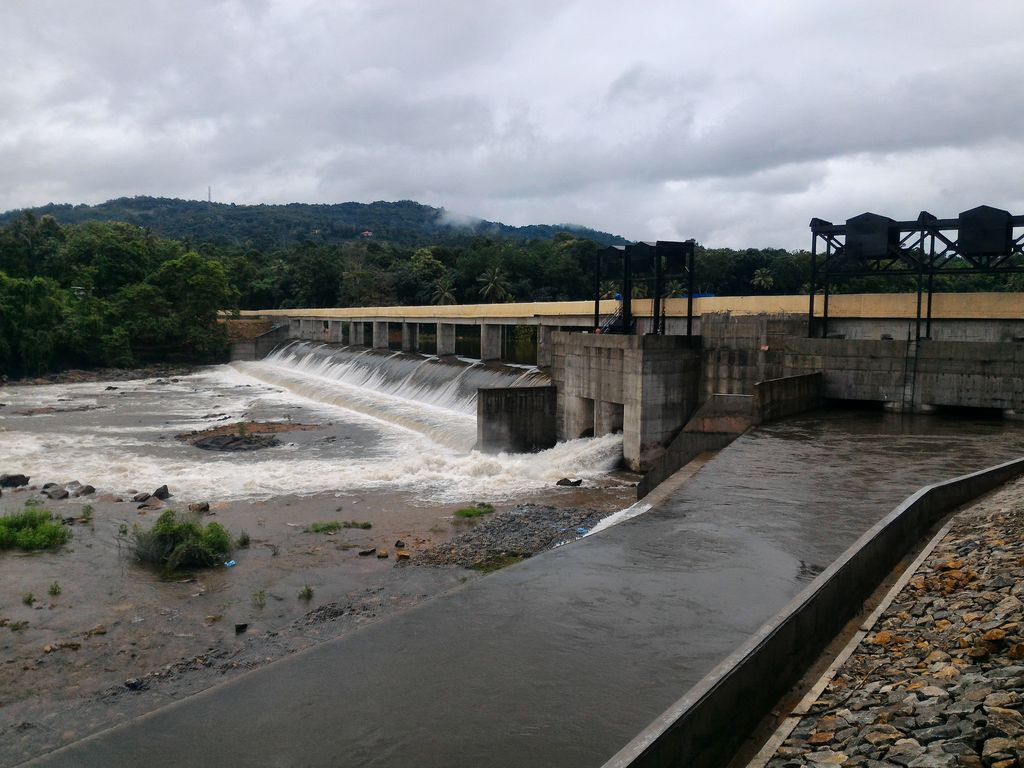

- Location within Kerala Location within India
- Country: India
- Location: Pathanamthitta, Kerala
- Coordinates: 9°24′44″N 76°52′48″E
- Purpose: Power
- Status: Operational
- Opening date: 2017 (9 years ago)
- Owner: Kerala State Electricity Board

Dam and spillways
- Type of dam: Gravity dam
- Impounds: Pamba River
- Height (foundation): 10.93 m (35.9 ft)
- Length: 227.50 m (746.4 ft)
- Elevation at crest: 51.00 m (167.32 ft)
- Spillway type: Ungated - overflow section

Reservoir
- Total capacity: 10,000,000 m^{3} (350,000,000 cu ft)
- Maximum water depth: 55.20 m (181.1 ft)
- Normal elevation: 51.00 m (167.32 ft)

Power Station
- Operator: Kerala State Electricity Board
- Type: Run-of-the-river
- Turbines: 2 × 3 MW
- Installed capacity: 6 MW
- Website; Official website

Perunthenaruvi Weir is a diversion dam built across Pamba river at villages of Naranammoozhy and Vechoochira in Pathanamthitta District of Kerala, India. Perumthenaruvi Small Hydroelectric Project 6 MW (2×3) is a run-of-the-river scheme in river Pamba, and the weir is a part of this scheme. This envisages the utilization of water from 442 km^{2} (171 sq mi) catchment of Pamba and Azhutha river for electricity generation under a net head of 18.00 m. The power house is located on the left bank of Pamba river. The weir is a concrete gravity type with a height of 10.93 metres (35.9 ft) and a length of 227.50 metres (746.4 ft). Taluks through which the release flow are Ranni, Konni, Kozhencherry, Thiruvalla, Chengannur, Kuttanadu, Mavelikara and Karthikappally.

== Specifications ==
- Latitude : 9⁰ 24′ 44 ” N
- Longitude: 76⁰ 52′ 48” E
- Panchayath : Ranni- Perinad
- Village : Naranammoozhi & Vechoochira
- District : Pathanamthitta
- River Basin : Pamba
- River: Pamba
- Release from Dam to river : Pamba
- Type of Dam : Concrete – Gravity
- Classification : Weir
- Maximum Water Level (MWL) : EL 55.20 m
- Full Reservoir Level ( FRL) : EL 51.0 m
- Storage at FRL : 1.00 Mm3
- Height from deepest foundation : 10.93 m
- Length : 227.50 m
- Spillway : Ungated- Overflow section
- Year of completion : 2017
- Crest LevelEL : 51.00 m
- Name of Project : Perunthenaruvi SHEP
- River Outlet : 2 Nos. 2.00x 4.00m

== Hydrology ==
- Catchment area - 442 km^{2}
- Average Annual Yield - 1093 Mm3
- Peak flood at the diversion weir - 395Cumecs

== Tourism ==
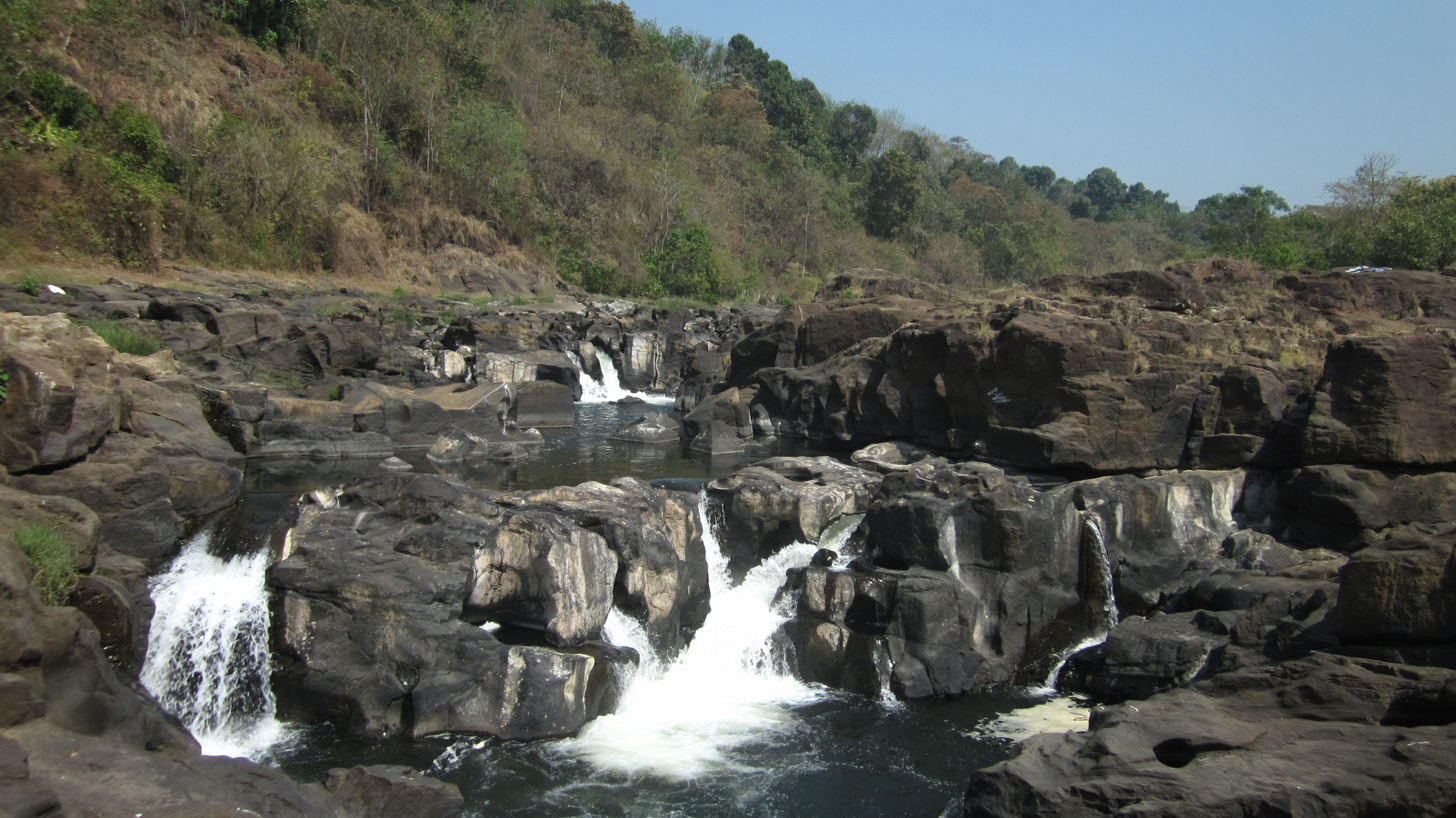
Poonthenaruvi water falls

The Poonthenaruvi Water falls and related Eco tourism project is near the weir site. There is hanging bridge and view towers to spectate the beauty of the ravine.
