= Perunthenaruvi Project =

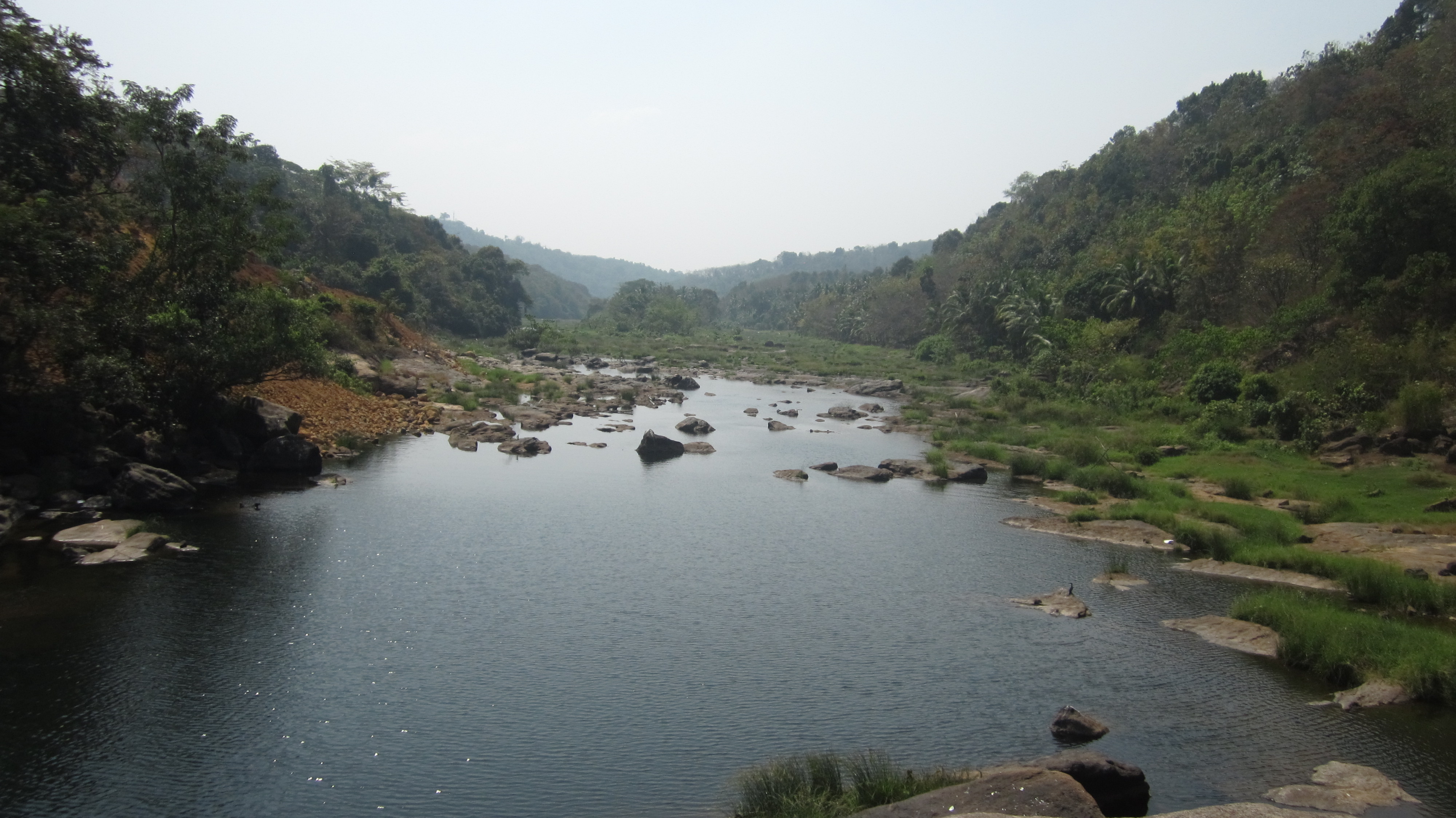
Perunthenaruvi stream

Perunthenaruvi Project is a tourism and hydroelectric power project at Perunthenaruvi near Vechoochira in Ranni, Kerala, India. The Kerala Tourism Development Corporation has launched the Perunthenaruvi tourism project as part of the eco-tourism chain linking Achankovil, Gavi, Konni and Ranni.

On 22 October 2017, the Chief Minister of Kerala launched the 6-MW hydroelectric power project by Kerala State Electricity Board in Perunthenaruvi. It is the smallest hydroelectric power project in the Pamba River.

== Gallery ==
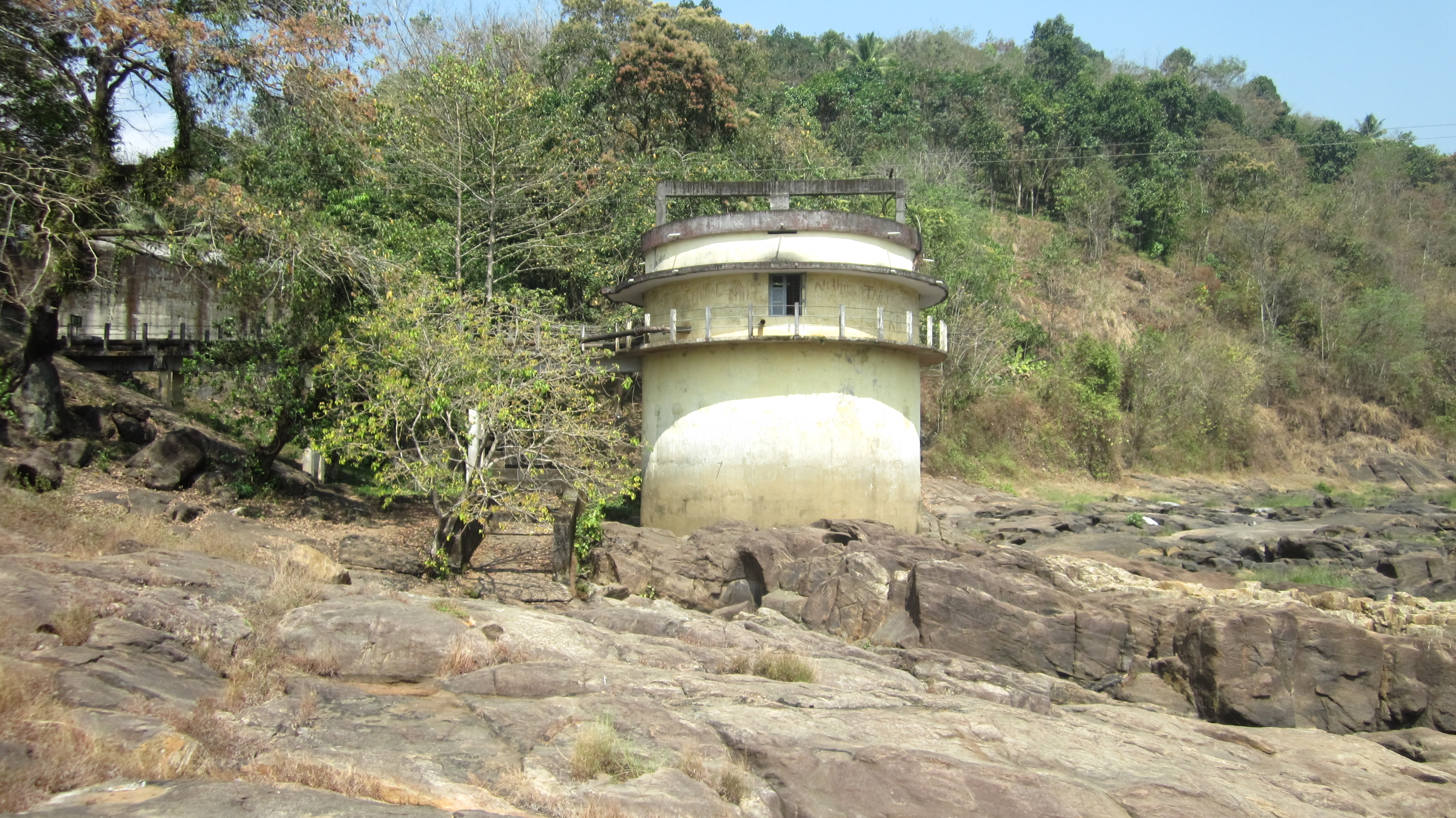

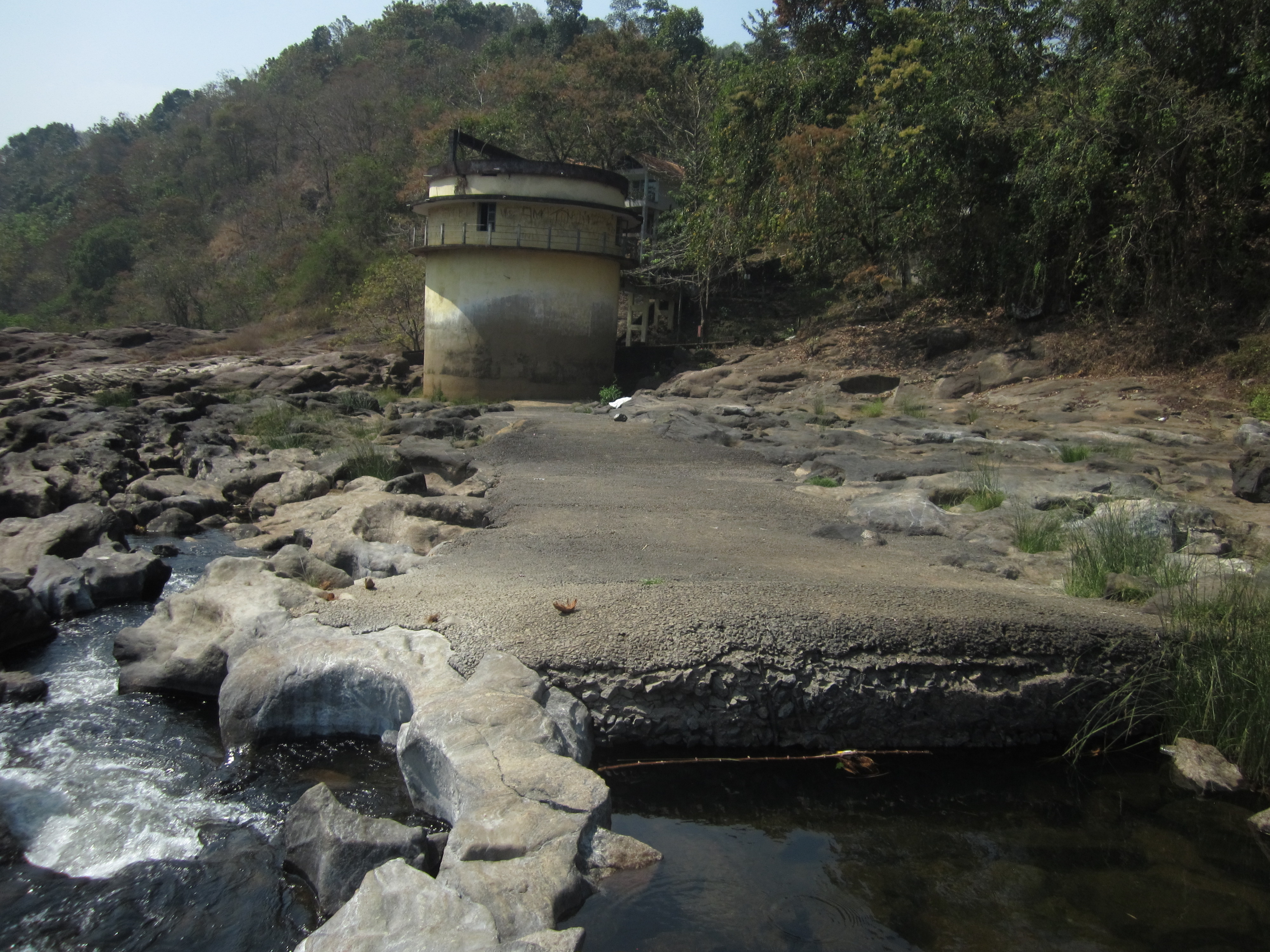

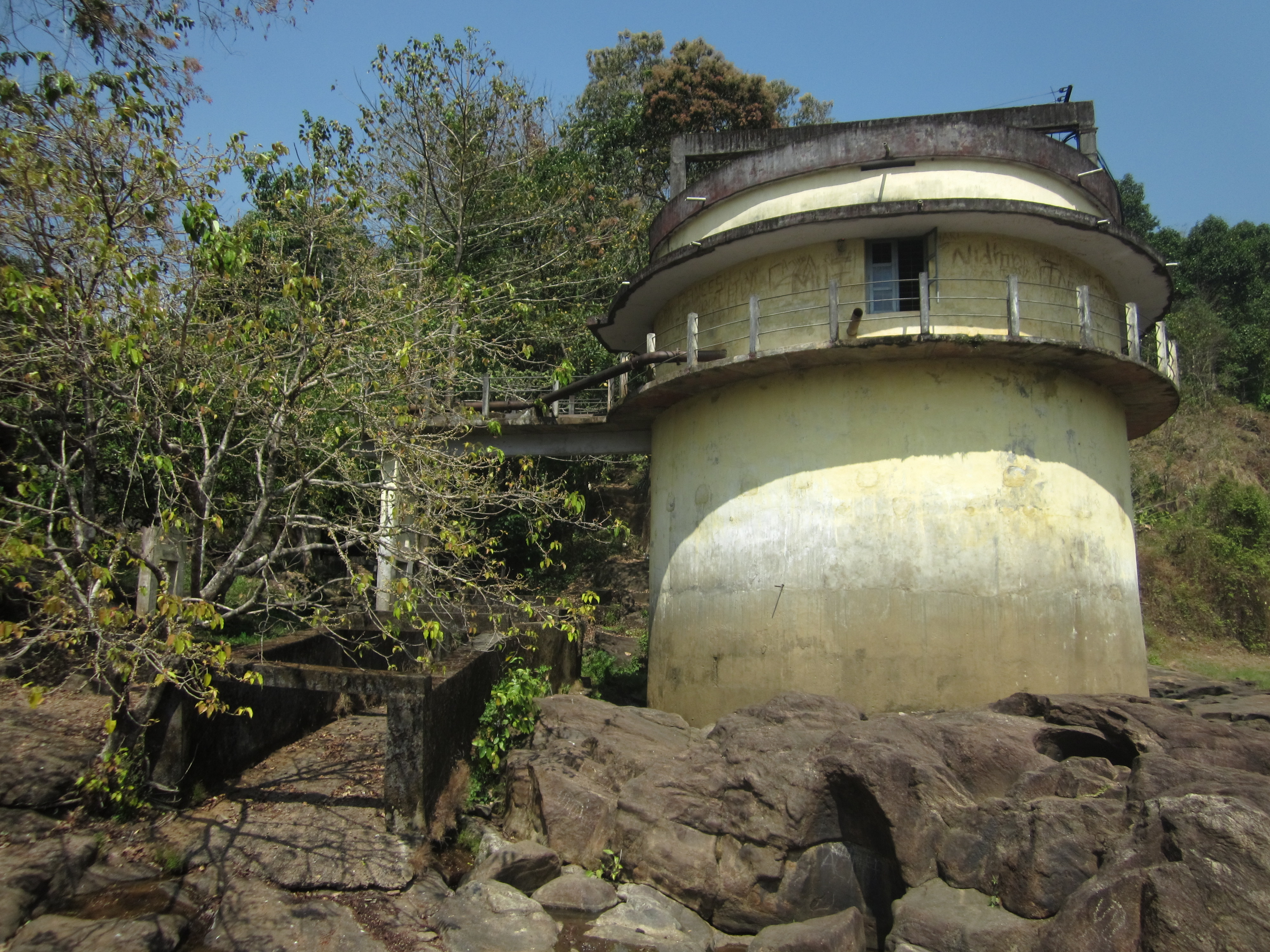

== See also ==
- Perunthenaruvi Falls
