= Mamam =

Mamam is a common Togolese surname. Notable people with the surname include:

- Chérif Touré Mamam (born 1978), Togolese footballer
- Souleymane Mamam (born 1985), Togolese footballer

== See also ==
- Mamam River
- Mamam (from Hebrew: ממ"מ), institutional protected space
