= Pandippara =

Village in Kerala, India

Pandippara is a small village in Idukki District in Kerala, India.

People started living in this village from the mid-1950s. Most of the early dwellers were from Kottayam and Pathanamthitta Districts. Pandippara has a syro malabar Catholic church (St. Joseph Church) situated at the top of the hill, around which the village has developed over the years. An Upper Primary School is associated with the church (St. Joseph U P School). Karikkintholam and Eettikavala are two different parts of the village. The village is connected with Thadiambadu, Vimalagiri, Upputhode, Thankamony, Nelivayal and Narakakanam by roads. The village includes a rock formation called Kurisupara, also known locally as "Tourist Para", which overlooks the surrounding area and part of the Idukki Arch Dam reservoir. The roads are good, and one can reach this place both from Cheruthoni and Kattappana. It is 16 kilometers from Cheruthoni and 20 kilometers from Kattappana.

There were only 10 to 15 families initially who came from Palai (Kottayam district) and Vechoochira (in Pathanamthitta district). These people started cultivating various crops like paddy and vegetables and spices like pepper, ginger, and cardamom. Slowly people started migrating from different places. Like every other Highrange area Pandippara was also known for its pepper cultivation. The initial people had to fight with wild animals during the early years.

The initial families who occupied the place were Pullanthanal, Nellickal, Puthettu, Maramattathil, Narikuzhiyil, Pulikkiyil, Kannamkottu, Valavanal, Adakkanattu, Parasseril, Ezharakathu, Koithanam, Chakalackal, Kaithackal, Udumpusseril, Peedikackal Karukayil, Parayakattil, Peedikaparambil, Paremakkal and Kainanikkal.

Now the parish has around 400 families, close to 200 Hindu families and few Muslin families. One notable aspect about the Hindus in the area, is that they are very co-operative and take part in all the church feast days and other religious activities.

Regarding the Pandippara post office the pin code is: 685609.
