= Keezhukara =

- village
- Location in Kerala, India Keezhukara (India)
- Coordinates: 9.349°N 76.705°E
- Country: India
- State: Kerala
- District: Pathanamthitta

Population (2008)
  - Total: 1,211

Languages
  - Official: Malayalam, English
- Time zone: UTC+5:30 (IST)
- PIN: 689 641
- Telephone code: 91-468
- Vehicle registration: KL-03
- Lok Sabha constituency: Pathanamthitta

Keezhukara, a small village in Pathanamthitta district, is about 135 km from Thiruvanandapuram, capital city of Kerala, India. It is on latitude 9.349 N and longitude 76.705 E. Pampa River is on the north and west. Kozhencherry is in the south and Melukara in the east. The interior is hilly but the riverine land is flat, fertile and arable. The population of Keezhukara in 2008 was 1211 in 292 households.
