= Chathanthara =

- village
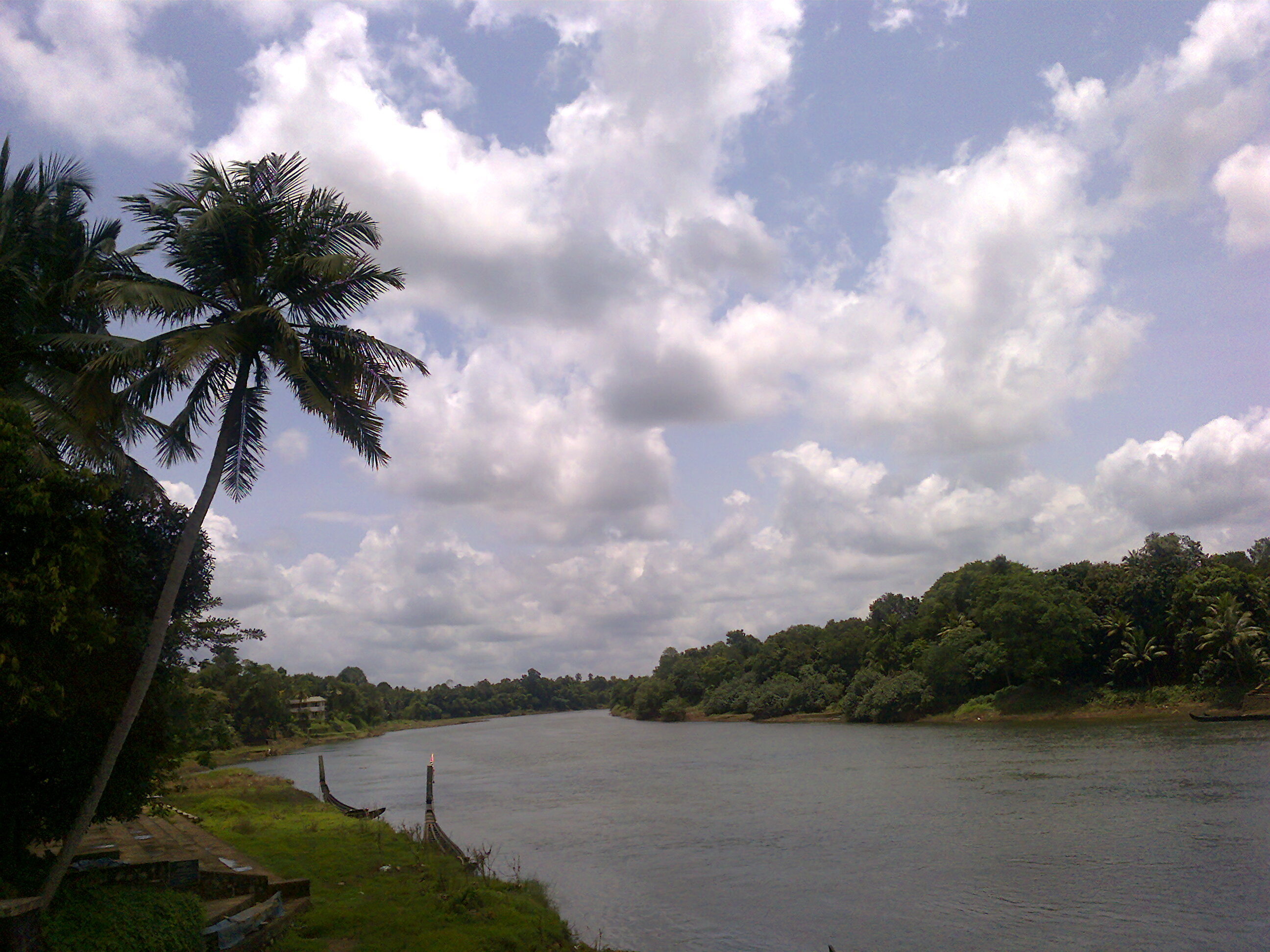

- Location in Kerala, India Chathanthara (India)
- Coordinates: 9°24′5″N 76°52′27″E
- Country: India
- State: Kerala
- District: Pathanamthitta

Government
  - Type: Panchayath
  - Body: Vechoochira panchayath
- Elevation: 150 m (490 ft)

Languages
  - Official: Malayalam, English
- Time zone: UTC+5:30 (IST)
- PIN: 686510
- Area code: 04735
- Vehicle registration: KL-62

Chathanthara is a small village in Vechoochira panchayath of Ranni taluk, Kerala state, India. It is about 10 km (6.2 mi) from Erumely, 18 km (11 mi) from Ranni and 7 km (4.3 mi) from Vechoochira. Local Landmark Perunthenaruvi Falls is just 1.5 km from the village.
