= Naranammoozhy =

- village
- Location in India, Kerala Naranammoozhy (India)
- Coordinates: 9°22′44.43″N 76°52′40.41″E
- Country: India
- State: Kerala
- District: Pathanamthitta

Government
  - Type: Panchayath
  - Body: Naranammoozhy panchayath

Area
  - Total: 33.61 km^{2} (12.98 sq mi)

Population (2001)
  - Total: 15,988

Languages
  - Official: Malayalam, English
- Time zone: UTC+5:30 (IST)
- PIN: 689711
- Area code: 04735
- Vehicle registration: KL-62, KL-03
- Coastline: 0 kilometres (0 mi)
- Nearest city: Perunad
- Lok Sabha constituency: Pathanamthitta
- Assembly constituency: Ranni
- Climate: Tropical summer (Köppen)
- Nearest airport: Cochin International Airport Limited

Naranammoozhy is a village and panchayat within Ranni taluk of Pathanamthitta district in Kerala state, India.

== History ==
The present day inhabitants of Naranamoozhy are the migrated farmers and rehabilitated people. It is believed that in the past, there existed a culture here which can easily be understood from the remains of certain sculptures, graves, houses and temples. Remnants of an old temple and pond were found at a place called Edakkunnam. The Aarattu ceremony associated with the festivals of Edamuri temple was conducted at the place 'Arattumannu'. At present, the people here live in religious harmony and prosperity with mutual understanding.

== Etymology ==
Once a person named 'Narayanan' lived here on the banks of the Pamba river, and thus the place got its name Narayanamoozhy which in course became Naranammoozhy.

== Demographics ==
As of the 2001 census, Naranammoozhy had a population of 15988, of whom 7928 were male and 8060 were female. The sex ratio was 1017, which was below the state average. About 94.6% of the total population was literate. Male literacy was 95.47% and female literacy was 92.9%.

== Administration ==
The panchayat spreads over the Ranni-Pazhavangadi, Athikkayam and Kollamula villages in Ranni taluk with an area of 33.61 km². The panchayath shares its boundary with Kollamula on the north, Perunad on the south and east and Ranni-Pazhavangadi on the west. Naranammoozhy panchayat, which was formed in 1983, is further divided into 14 wards for administrative convenience.

=== Wards ===
- Edamury
- Kurumbanmoozhy
- Thompikandam
- Chembanoly
- Kadumeenchira
- Kudamurutty
- Athikayam
- Poopalli
- Chollanavayal
- Adichipuzha
- Kakkudumon
- Ponnampara
- Kannampally
- Naranammoozhy

== Geography ==
It is basically a mid-land region with beautiful landscapes, fertile soil and abundant forests. The holy river Pamba flows through the place westwards.

== Economy ==
Naranamoozhy's economy is predominantly agrarian based. Rubber is widely cultivated here with suitable climate and geographic conditions.

== Places of interest ==
- Kakkattukoikkal Sastha temple, Perunad
- Perunthenaruvi Falls
- Nilakkal St. Thomas Ecumenical Church
- India Pentecostal Church of God
- Bethany ashram, Perunad
- Kattukal stream
- St George Orthodox Church, Naranamoozhy
- Nilakkal Marthoma Church
- Naranammoozhy St thomas Marthoma Church
