= Njunungar =

River in India

Njunungar River is a small tributary of both the Pamba in the Indian state of Kerala. It flows near Sabarimala.
