= Shiriya River =

Indian river

Shiriya River is a river flowing through the states of Karnataka and Kerala.

Shiriya River is 67 km in length, making it the eighteenth longest river in Kerala, and the second longest river in Kasaragod district. It originates in Anegundi Reserve Forest in Dakshina Kannada district in Karnataka at an elevation of 230 metres above sea level, flows primarily in a westward direction, and empties into the Arabian Sea near the town of Shiriya located about 11 km north of Kasaragod town in Kerala. At its mouth the river joins the backwaters between the towns of Shiriya and Kumbla forming the Kumbla-Shiriya estuary.

The main tributaries of the river are Kallanje Thodu, Kanyana Thodu, Eramatti Hole and Kumbla.
