= Kolarayar =

River in India

Kolarayar River is a 8 km long revived river which acts as a tributary of both the Pamba and the Manimala rivers in the Indian state of Kerala. It passes through the panchayats of Kadapra and Niranam.
