= Aadhi Pamba =

River in Kerala, India

Aadhi Pamba is a branch of the Pamba River, the third longest river in the South Indian state of Kerala. It flows through the outskirts of Chengannur, Pathanamthitta and Alappuzha. Varattar has regained its lost glory after the rejuvenation works and because of which water flowing from Koyipram Varalthodu, Poovannappuzhathodu, Poongayilthodu, and Chennathu Puthenthodu through Idanaadu reached Aadipamba, near Panchavadi.
