= Vechoochira =

- Village
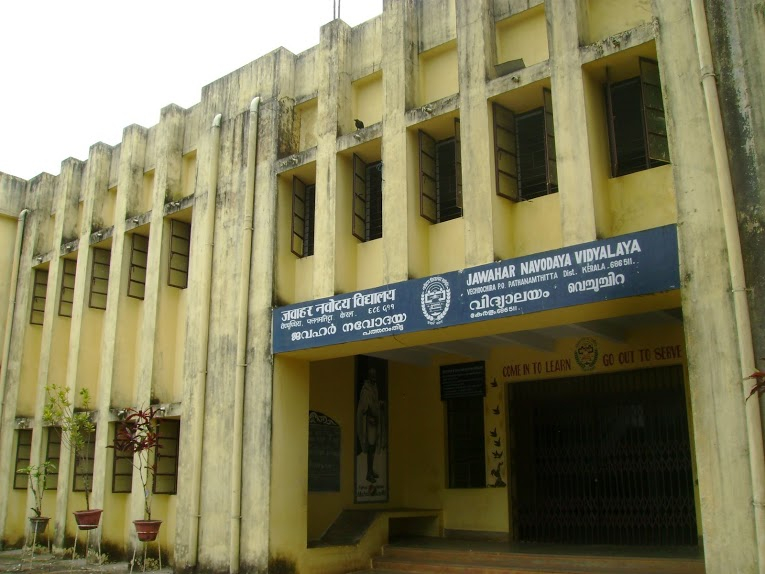
- Interactive map of Vechoochira
- Coordinates: 9.435°N 76.8522°E
- Country: India
- State: Kerala
- District: Pathanamthitta

Government
  - Type: Panchayath
  - Body: Vechoochira grama panchayath

Area
  - Total: 51.8 km^{2} (20.0 sq mi)
- Elevation: 3 m (9.8 ft)

Population (2011)
  - Total: 21,237
  - Density: 410/km^{2} (1,060/sq mi)

Languages
  - Official: Malayalam, English
- Time zone: UTC+5:30 (IST)
- PIN: 686511
- Telephone code: 04735
- Vehicle registration: KL-03, KL-62
- Literacy: 96.58%

Vechoochira is a village located in Thiruvalla Revenue Division of Pathanamthitta district of Kerala, India. The nearest Railway Station is Thiruvalla, located 45km away from the village.

== Location ==
Vechoochira is about 6 km (3.7 mi) to 7 km (4.3 mi) from Erumely, a Hindu pilgrimage centre, and 12 km (7.5 mi) to 14 km (8.7 mi) from Ranni.

== History ==
From 1900-1920, missionaries from England established a farm area near Vechoochira, known as Mission Kunnu. When the English missionaries departed, the land was given to local people. Many families from the Tiruvalla-Vennikulam area migrated to Vechoochira and bought land properties from the locals. No prior history is available before early 1900, but it is assumed the area was part of the vast forest area, and indigenous tribal people (Adivasis) used to live in non-permanent structures. It is likely these tribes were living there for several centuries. At the beginning of 1900, the Travancore rulers gave about 100 acres of farmland to a court advocate (believed to be from Chengannur) for lease and later this land was acquired by NSS cooperative society and now it is known as 'Noorokkad' estate (emerging from 100 acres of kaadu). In late 1960s displaced families from the Idukki dam project were rehabilitated to an area called Idukki kooppu (south west of Vechoochira-Koothattukulam). Ennooramvayal is another name for area north west of Vechoochira, denoting 800th field place of CMS missionaries. Also, in 1920-40s a severe form of smallpox (Vasoori) caused many deaths in Vechoochira. Kunnam Village is the other main place in Vechoochira. The educational institutions like Viswabrahmana college, Government LP School, MTVHS School and Marthoma LP School are situated here. Kunnam Devi Temple is another pilgrimage attraction.

== Veterans' Colony ==
The "Ex-servicemen colony", land given to veterans of the Second World War and China conflict by the Indian government, was established in Vechoochira by the Indian Government as a reward for their services.

== Education ==
Many well known educational institutions are located in this panchayatu (village), including two higher secondary schools, a high school, an arts college, a polytechnic institute, a Navodya high school, a vocational higher secondary school and many English medium primary schools.

== Demography ==
People from all the major religions (Christianity, Hinduism, Islam) live here together with due respect to each other. Most of the villagers are farmers, cultivating banana, tapioca, rubber, coconut, etc.

== Tourism ==
Perunthenaruvi falls, a famous water fall in Pamba river is located in this panchayath. It is about 4 km (2.5 mi) from the town, accessible through paved (asphalt) road. The entire pampa river water is converging and flowing through channels before it falls to a 30 ft drop. The base of the fall is very shallow and deep consisting of several twistering spots. If you want to see the water fall closely, take all precaution not to step on slippery rocks and edges. Every year many people lose their lives by underestimating the force of the water flow and depth. Kerala Tourism Development Corporation (KTDC) has built a view gallery and rest area near the fall. Kerala State Electricity Board (KSEB) will be building a 3MW power generation station (utilizing hydro electric power) at the fall in the near future. Perunthenaruvi Weir is dam constructed across the Pamba River as part of a hydroelectric project. Dam site is a tourist spot. Notable People: Sri. Vechoochira Madhu (A well-known journalist and writer in Malayalam)

== Schools ==
- Navodaya Vidyalaya
- Govt Poly Technic college
- Govt Higher Secondary School
- Little Angels English Medium School
- C.M.S.L.P School, Ennoramvayal, Vechoochira - The first educational institution started by CMS Missionaries
- Govt. LP School, Kunnam, Vechoochuira
- Viswabrahmana College Kunnam, Vechoochira
- MTVHS School Kunnam
- MTLP School Anamadam, Kunnam
- St Thomas High School Vechoochira

== Nearby places ==
- Navodya junction
- Punchiri mukku
- Mannadisala
- Perunthenaruvi
- Navodaya
- Varkkalamukku
- Arayanpara
- Kollamula
- Chathanthara
- Ranni
- Erumely
- Athikkayam
- Mukkoottuthara
- Plaveli Niranu
- Paruva
- Kunnam
- Kumbithodu
- vahamukku
- Anamadam
- Achadippara
- Koothattukulam
- Kakkudukka
- Nellisheripaar
- Noorokaadu

== See also ==
- Pathanamthitta
