= Utharappalli River =

River in India

Utharappalli River or locally called as Varattar is one of the longest interlinking rivers in Kerala, India. It is a tributary of both the Pamba River and the Achankoil River. It starts from Achankoil and ends in Pampa.

Utharappalli river originates from Puthattinkara kadavu of Achankovil River (Venmoney Panchayat) and merges with Pamba River at Uthrappalli kadavu (Budhanoor Panchayat). The river runs through Ala, Cheriyanad, Puliyoor Panchayat's and serves the people and their lands for drinking water and agricultural needs.

The river is now almost inexistent due to excessive encroachment and various blockages along its route.

The famous Uthunkuzhi bridge is on the Utharappalli River linking Ala Panchayat with Puliyoor Panchayat.
