= Varattar River (Pamba) =

River in India

Varattar is a branch of the Pamba River, the third longest river in the South Indian state of Kerala.It is a 9.5 km long water channel that in the past connected and linked the Pampa to the Manimala River. It flows through the outskirts of Chengannur, Pathanamthitta and Alappuzha. Its a perennial freshwater source linking two rivers in Alappuzha and Pathanamthitta districts. But greatly diminished instream flow due to encroachments, sand mining and weed growth have severely affected the size and strength of Varattar and it became a river with no water.

== Rejuvenation projects ==
The legislative Committee for Environment inspected the Varattar river bed in 2002 to assess the encroachments and observed that almost two-thirds of the Varattar was encroached by locals for cultivating rice, vegetables, tapioca and fodder grass. In 2014 River rejuvenation project was carried out to revive the river. Land encroachments and sand sedimentations were removed and the flow of water was restored. A second phase of this project was carried out in 2017. 12 acres of encroachments from a 4 km stretch of the river were evicted. Man-made structures constructed along the river were removed through mutual consultations. The ‘Varatte aar’ (‘let the river come’ in Malayalam) campaign was a unique experiment in water conservation and environment management efforts.

Varattar has regained its lost glory after the rejuvenation works and because of which water flowing from Koyipram Varalthodu, Poovannappuzhathodu, Poongayilthodu, and Chennathu Puthenthodu through Idanaadu reached Aadipamba, near Panchavadi.

== Benefits of the river ==
The major direct benefits of Varattar are water for Household Use, fertile soil on the banks of the Varattar, means of transporting goods and passengers, irrigating agricultural lands in the two panchayats. The Varattar was a major corridor for transportation of snake boats which came from far to participate in the Aranmula Snake boat race.
