= Thanungattilthodu =

River in India

Thanungattilthodu is a tributary stream of the Pamba River, the third longest river in the South Indian state of Kerala. It flows through the town of Kozhencherry in Pathanamthitta District.
