= Madatharuvi =

River in India

Madatharuvi is a stream that joins the Pampa River in Ranni. It consist of a series of waterfalls and rapids that pass through pristine tropical forests.

Untouched by industries the water is pure and fresh with a few species of fresh water fish. It is near to Ranny city which the place is Mandamaruthi. From Mandamaruthi it is near 5 km. It is a small water stream with fresh water which is originating from forest, at last it will reach and join in Pamba River.
