= Melukara =

- village
- Location in Kerala, India Melukara (India)
- Coordinates: 9°21′0″N 76°43′0″E
- Country: India
- State: Kerala
- District: Pathanamthitta

Languages
  - Official: Malayalam, English Hindi
- Time zone: UTC+5:30 (IST)
- Postal code: 689641
- Vehicle registration: KL-03
- Coastline: 0 kilometres (0 mi)
- Climate: Tropical monsoon (Köppen)
- Avg. summer temperature: 35 °C (95 °F)
- Avg. winter temperature: 20 °C (68 °F)

Melukara is a small sub-village of Kozhencherry 689641 pinin Pathanamthitta district, Kerala, India. Its official languages are Malayalam, English and Hindi.

== Location ==
Melukara is surrounded on three sides by the Pampa River.

== Climate and agriculture ==
The climate is humid, and the land is fertile. In addition to vegetable agriculture, farmers in Melukara cultivate coconut, mangosteen, rambutan, jackfruit, mango, nutmeg and rubber trees.

== Temples ==
Sree Subrahmania Swami Temple is in the heart of Melukara and thiruvulsavam is being conducted every year. Chittedathu Nagachamundi Devi temple, Puthuppallil Bhagavathi Temple, A Marthoma Primary School, A Grade Vayanashala, A Marthoma church, Subrahmania swami temple, Sreekrishna swami temple, health center are a few social and religious centers in Melukara.

== Snake boats ==
Melukara palliyodam (snakeboat) won the first prize in boat race which was conducted for the first time in Aranmula. Melukara won 8 times in mannam trophy. In 2011 the residents of Melukara made a new Snake boat "melukara palliyodam". It was built by Ayroor Chellappan Achari and his teams and the snake boat ( melukara palliyodam) completely renovated in 2025 by changankary venu achari. added gold and silver copper protections and added Engraving works on wall and floor side walls. and The longest boat in history so far is the snake boat (melukara palliyodam) The renovated boat won the 2025 Mannam Trophy Uthrittathi Vallam kali.

== Festivals ==
Every alternate year Sree Nagachamundi Devi Thiruvutsavam will celebrate with Bhairavi-kkolam thullal and kalamezhuthum pattum. Melukara SreeKrishna Swami Temple is owned by the Chittedathu family. The Sree Palan Pulayan Temple in Kanjeetukara is also owned by Chittedathu Family. It is a history in the world that Adiyane Poojikkunna Tambran.
