= Edanad =

- village
- Interactive map of Edanad
- Country: India
- State: Kerala
- District: Alappuzha
- Talukas: Alappuzha

Languages
  - Official: Malayalam, English
- Time zone: UTC+5:30 (IST)
- PIN: 689123
- Vehicle registration: KL-30

Edanad is a village in Alappuzha district in the state of Kerala, India.
