= Kuttemperoor =

River in India

Kuttemperoor River is a 12 km long revived river which acts as a tributary of both the Pamba and the Achankovil rivers in the Indian state of Kerala. The River has its northern end in the Pamba and the southern end in the Achankovil river. The river has its northern end in the Pamba and the southern end in the Achankovil river. It flows through the towns of Parumala, Budhanoor and Ennakkad. When the water level at the Pamba is higher it flows from Pamba to Achankovil and when the Achankovil river has a higher water level it flows from Achankovil to Pamba.

Before the Kuttemperoor River degraded about 25,000 acres (100 km^{2}) of paddy fields were irrigated and local traders used the river for transport.

The Kuttemperoor River had degraded due to sand mining and dumping of septic and plastic waste. Once over 100 m wide by 2005 its width had decreased to 10–15 m. Sand mining continued after it was banned in the area in 1997.

A rejuvenation project was launched in January 2017 under the Mahatma Gandhi National Rural Employment Guarantee (MGNREGA) scheme. At a wage cost of around Rs 1 crore 700 women and men spent 40,000 man days cleaning up the river.

As a result of the project the water flow returned to normal and the water level in wells increased improving local's previous acute water shortage; fish returned to the river, and residents of Budhanoor hope to be able to use the river's water for drinking and cooking in the future.
