= Kozhithodu =

River in Kerala, India

Kozhithodu is a tributary of the Pamba River, the third longest river in the South Indian state of Kerala. It separates Aranmula and Edayaranmula. This stream is located in Pathanamthitta District.
