= Mamam River =

River in Kerala, India

Mamam River is a small river located in the Thiruvananthapuram district of Kerala, India. Malayalam: മാമം പുഴ. It originates from the Pandalakode hills in Thiruvananthapuram and flows 27 km westwards into the Anchuthengu lake. The river basin is 144 km long. This river surrounds one side of Attingal. Vamanapuram, Mamom and Ayirur rivers form the Vamanapuram drainage basin with a total catchment area of 867 sq.km

Mamam is the 37th river of Kerala. It flows through Saigramam Global village, a self-sufficient and heritage village. The river also forms waterfalls at Saigramam. This river flows along the southern part of Mudakkal panchayat and splits at Andoorkonam in Attingal. This branch flows westwards and joins the Vamanapuram river. The other branch flows south, crosses Enchakal, turns west and joins Anchuthengu Lake. The Changadam check dam is located on this branch.
