= Athikkayam =

- Town
- Location in Kerala, India Athikkayam (India)
- Coordinates: 9.402830°N 76.849270°E
- Country: India
- State: Kerala
- District: Pathanamthitta

Government
  - Type: Democratic
  - Body: Naranammoozhy Grama panchayath

Languages
  - Official: Malayalam, English
- Time zone: UTC+5:30 (IST)
- Postal code: 689711
- Area code: +91 - 04735
- Vehicle registration: KL-62, KL-03
- Website: http://www.athikayam.in/

Athikkayam is a village located in the Pathanamthitta district of Kerala State, India. It is a small village that is situated on the bank of the Pamba River It's one of the 11 villages in Ranni taluk.

== Climate ==
Climate data for Athikkayam, Kerala
Month	Jan	Feb	Mar	Apr	May	Jun	Jul	Aug	Sep	Oct	Nov	Dec	Year
Mean daily maximum °C (°F)	34.6 (94.3)	38.5 (101.3)	40.1 (104.2)	37.2 (99.0)	36.7 (98.1)	29.6 (85.3)	27.8 (82.0)	26.0 (78.8)	28.4 (83.1)	30.4 (86.7)	31.1 (88.0)	30.6 (87.1)	32.6 (90.7)
Mean daily minimum °C (°F)	15.8 (60.4)	16.5 (61.7)	17.7 (63.9)	19.9 (67.8)	20.6 (69.1)	20.3 (68.5)	19.4 (66.9)	19.6 (67.3)	19.9 (67.8)	19.8 (67.6)	18.4 (65.1)	16.8 (62.2)	18.7 (65.7)
Average precipitation mm (inches)	34 (1.3)	48 (1.9)	116 (4.6)	238 (9.4)	466 (18.3)	682 (26.9)	868 (34.2)	725 (28.5)	547 (21.5)	721 (28.4)	643 (25.3)	248 (9.8)	5,336 (210.1)
Source: Climate-Data.org

== Suburbs of Athikkayam ==
- Kadumeenchira, Madanthamon, Chempanoli
- Kakkudumon, Kannampally, Ponnampara
- Adichipuzha, Mukkam, Naranammoozhy
- Kudamurutty, Kochukulam, Thonikkadavu
- Perumthenaruvi, Kurumbanmoozhy
- Edamury, Thombikandom,
