= Azhuthayar =

Azhuthayar River
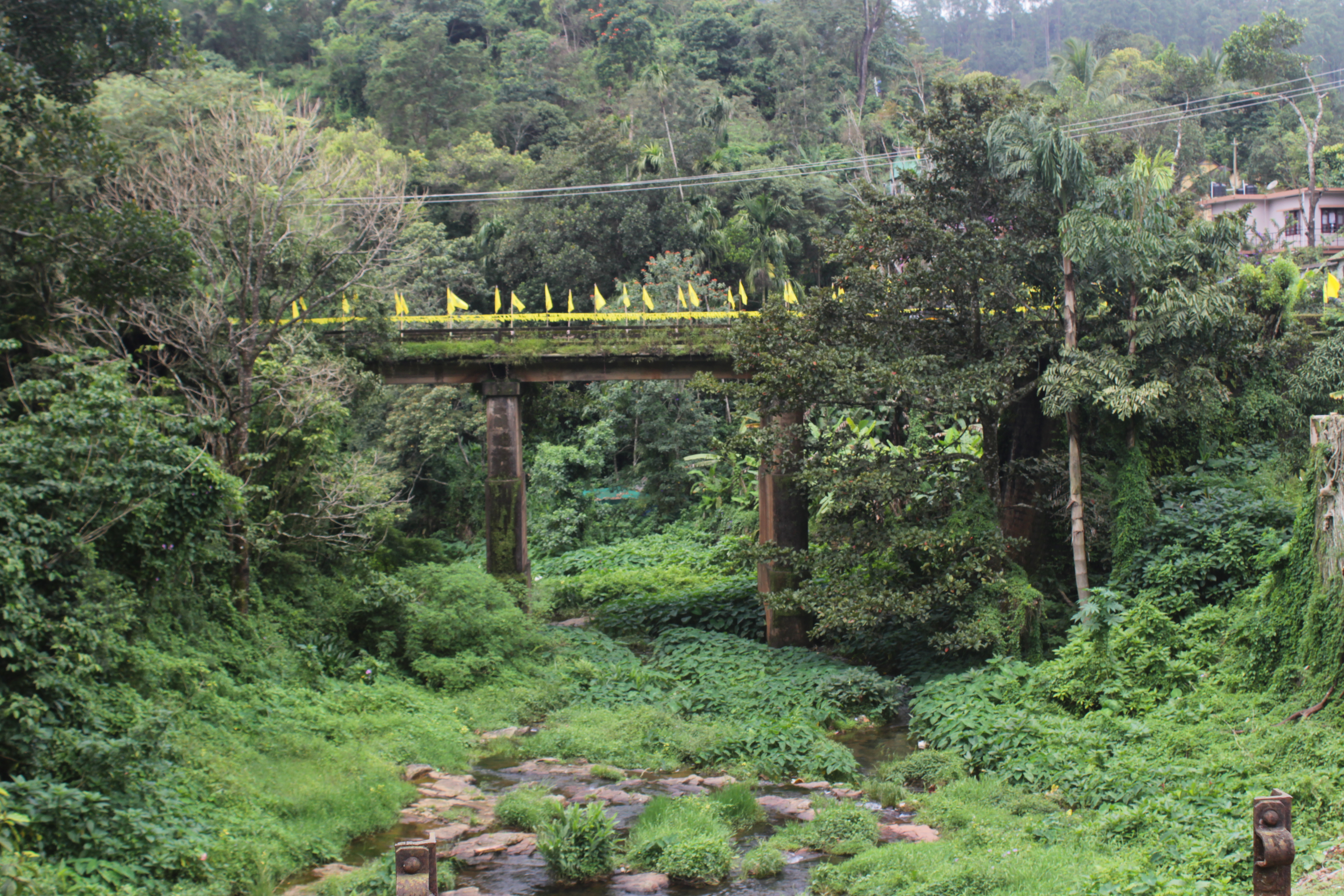
- Azhutha river in Peerumedu

- Location within Kerala Location within India

Physical characteristics
- Mouth
  - coordinates: 9.4200616°N 76.9406305°E

Basin features
- Progression: Pamba River

Azhuthayar or Azhutha River is a tributary of the Pamba River, the third longest river in the South Indian state of Kerala. It originates from Peerumedu, flows through dense forests and reaches Koruthodu. From there it forms the boundary between Kottayam and Idukki districts. It then crosses the traditional Sabarimala trek route, that extends from Erumeli to Sabarimala, at a place called Azhutha (near Kalaketti Temple) before joining with Pamba River at Kanamala (Pambavalley).

Azhutha Dam is a small diversion dam built on the Azhutha River, at Azhutha in Peerumed Grama Panchayat of Idukki District. It acts mainly as a diversion dam to supply water to the Idukki Dam. The Azhutha Dam was constructed as an augmentation dam for the Idukki Hydro Electric Project. The release of the water from the dam is to Azhutha river and it flows through Ranni and Ayroor taluks.

Like the Pamba, its parent river, Azhuthayar is also closely related to the legend of Lord Ayyappan, a popular Hindu deity worshipped mainly in Kerala. The river Pamba, ultimately flows around 180 kilometres (112 mi) through towns and villages Ranni, Cherukolpuzha, Kozhencherry, Maramon, Aranmula, Chengannur, Parumala, Neerettupuram, Kavalam, Nedumudi and Thakazhy before joining Vembanad lake.
