= Pamba River =

River in India

Coordinates: 9°30′N 76°25′E

Pamba River Pampa River
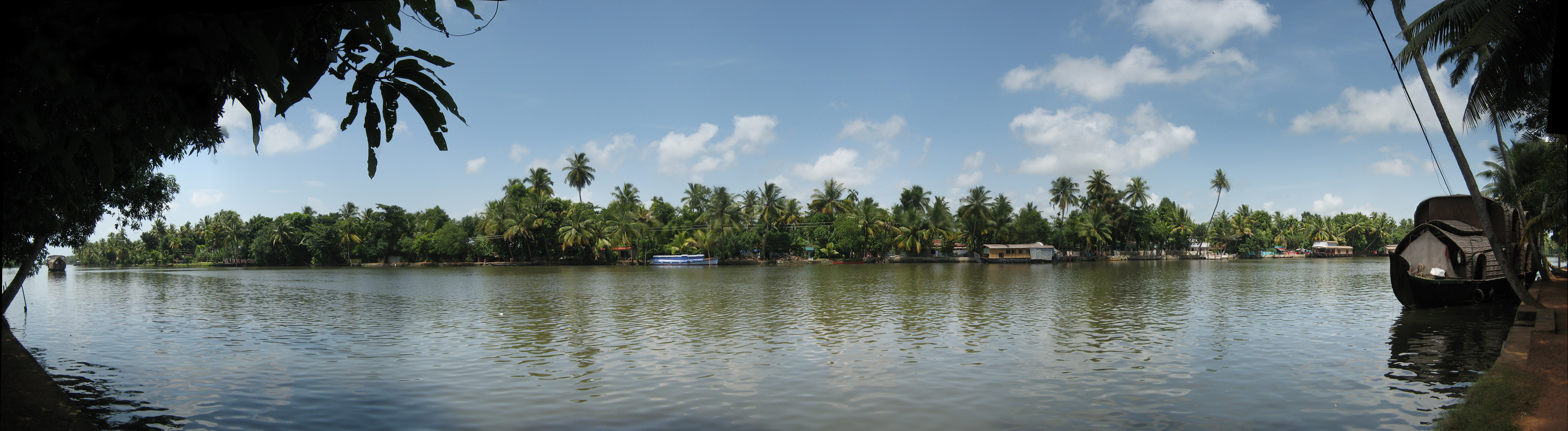

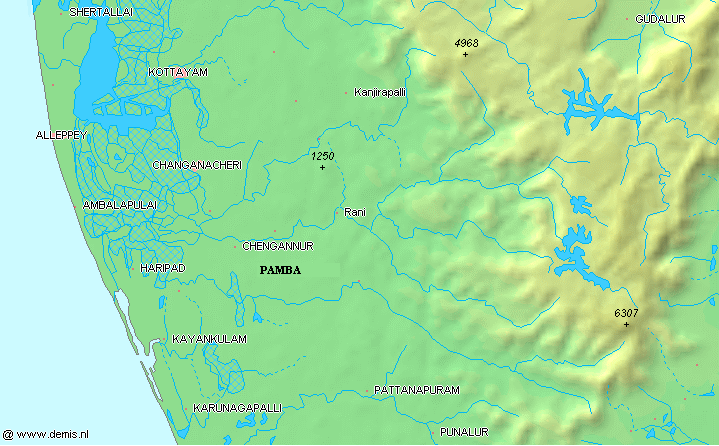
- Labelled map of Pamba River
- Native name: പമ്പ നദി (Malayalam)

Location
- Country: India
- State: Kerala
- District: Idukki, Pathanamthitta, Kottayam, Alappuzha

Physical characteristics
- Source
  - location: Pulachimala
  - elevation: 1,650 m (5,410 ft)
- Mouth
  - location: Vembanad Lake, Thottappally Spillway & Arabian Sea
- Length: 176 km (109 mi)
- Basin size: 2,235 km^{2} (863 sq mi)
- Discharge
  - average: 109 m^{3}/s (3,800 cu ft/s)

The Pamba River (also called Pampa River) is the third longest river in the Indian state of Kerala, after Periyar and Bharathappuzha, and the longest river in the erstwhile former princely state of Travancore. The Sabarimala Temple, dedicated to Lord Ayyappa, is located on the banks of the river Pamba.

The River Pamba enriches the lands of Pathanamthitta district and the Kuttanad area of Alappuzha district.

== Course ==
The Pamba originates at the Pulachimalai Hill in the Peerumedu Plateau in the Western Ghats at an altitude of 1,670 metres (5,480 ft). Starting from Pathanamthitta District and traversing a distance of 176 kilometres (109 mi) through Pathanamthitta and Alappuzha districts, the river joins the Arabian Sea through a number of channels. Following its confluence with the Kakkiyar River it flows westwards until the Pamba is meet by the Arudhai Aar River. The Pamba heads south-east from Narayanamuzhi to the confluence of the Kakkattar River, whereafter it flows south to Vadasserikkara where it receives the Kallar River (Pamba).

One branch of Pamba called Varattar flows from Arattupuzha/Puthenkavu and along Edanad, Othera, Thiruvanvandoor, Eramallikkara and flows into Manimala River at Kallumkal East side.

Another branch of Pamba flows from Kuthiathode and joins with Manimala River at Kallumkal West side, and branches out again at Nedumpuram from Manimala River and flows along Thalavady, Edathua, Champakulam, Pullangady, Nedumudy and empties into Vembanad Lake at Kainakary. This branch links with Mainstream Pamba River at Pullangady while continuing to flow to Vembanad lake. One branch of Achankovil River joins with Pamba at Paippad/Veeyapuram, while another branch flows into Pamba again via Karichal, Cheruthana. Perunthenaruvi is the major waterfall in Pamba river between vechoochira and Athikkayam.

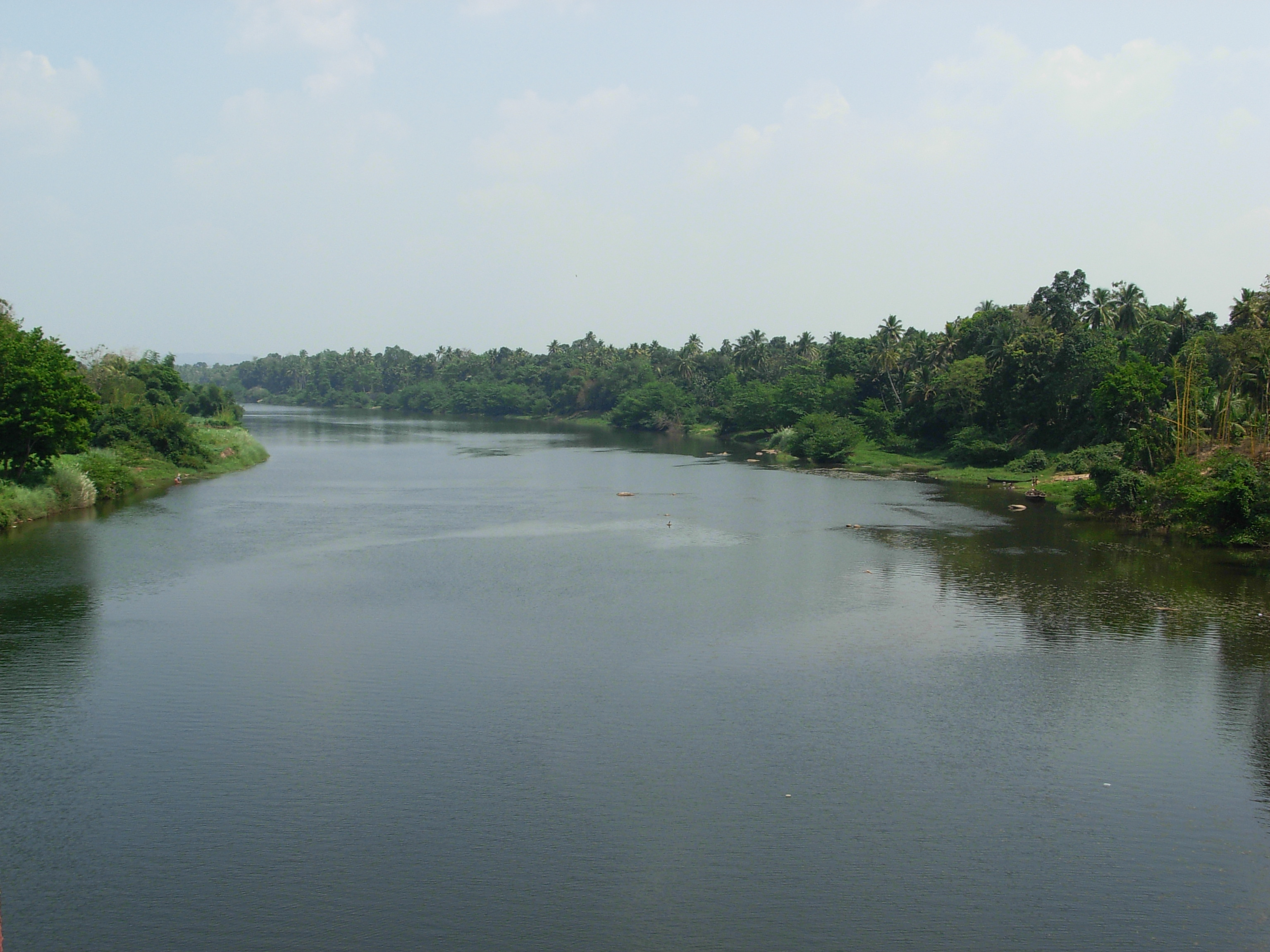
Pamba river at Aranmula

The river flows through Perunad, Chittar, Vadasserikkara, Ranni, Ayroor, Cherukole, Keezhukara, Kozhencherry, Maramon, Aranmula, Arattupuzha, Edanad, Puthencavu, Chengannur, Kallissery, Pandanad, Parumala, Mannar, Kadapra, Melpadom, Thevery, Veeyapuram, Thakazhy, Pullangady, Pallathuruthy before emptying into the Vembanad Lake, while another branch flows directly via Karuvatta into Thottappally Spillway.

The Pamba basin extends over an area of 2,235 square kilometres (863 sq mi) with the entire catchment area within Kerala state. The basin is bounded on the east by the Western Ghats and on the west by the Arabian Sea. The river shares its northern boundary with the Manimala River basin, and the southern boundary with the Achankovil River basin.

== Tributaries ==
- Azhuthayar
- Kakkiyar
- Kakkattar
- Kallar
- Aadhi Pamba
- Varattar
- Kuttemperoor
- Utharappalliyar
- Kolarayar
- Njunungar
- Madatharuvi
- Kozhithodu
- Thanungattilthodu
- Moozhiyar

== Topography of the basin, reservoirs and command area ==
The Pamba basin - like all the river basins in Kerala - can be divided into three natural zones based on elevation, consisting of low land or seaboard, midland and high land. The coast for a short distance along the borders of lakes is flat, retreating from it the surface roughens up into slopes which gradually combine and swell into mountains on the east. The low land area along sea coast is generally swampy and liable to be flooded during monsoon inundation. The plains/midlands succeed low land in gentle ascents and valleys interspersed with isolated low hills. The high land on the eastern portion is broken by long spurs, dense forests, extensive ravines and tangled jungles. Towering above all their slopes are Western Ghats that form eastern boundary of the basins.

Kuttanad is a river delta landscape region in Kerala known for its vast paddy fields and geographical peculiarities. It is in the Districts of Alappuzha, Kottayam and Pathanamthitta. The region has the lowest altitude in India, and is one of the few places in the world where farming is carried on around 1.2 to 3.0 metres (4 to 10 ft) below sea level, using rice paddies largely located on reclaimed land amid the delta. Kuttanad is historically important in the ancient history of South India and is the major rice producer in the state. Farmers of Kuttanad are famous for Biosaline Farming. The United Nations Food and Agriculture Organization (FAO) has declared the Kuttanad Farming System as a Globally Important Agricultural Heritage System (GIAHS) in 2013. Four of Kerala's major rivers, the Pamba, Meenachil, Achankovil and Manimala flow into the region.

== Endangered state ==
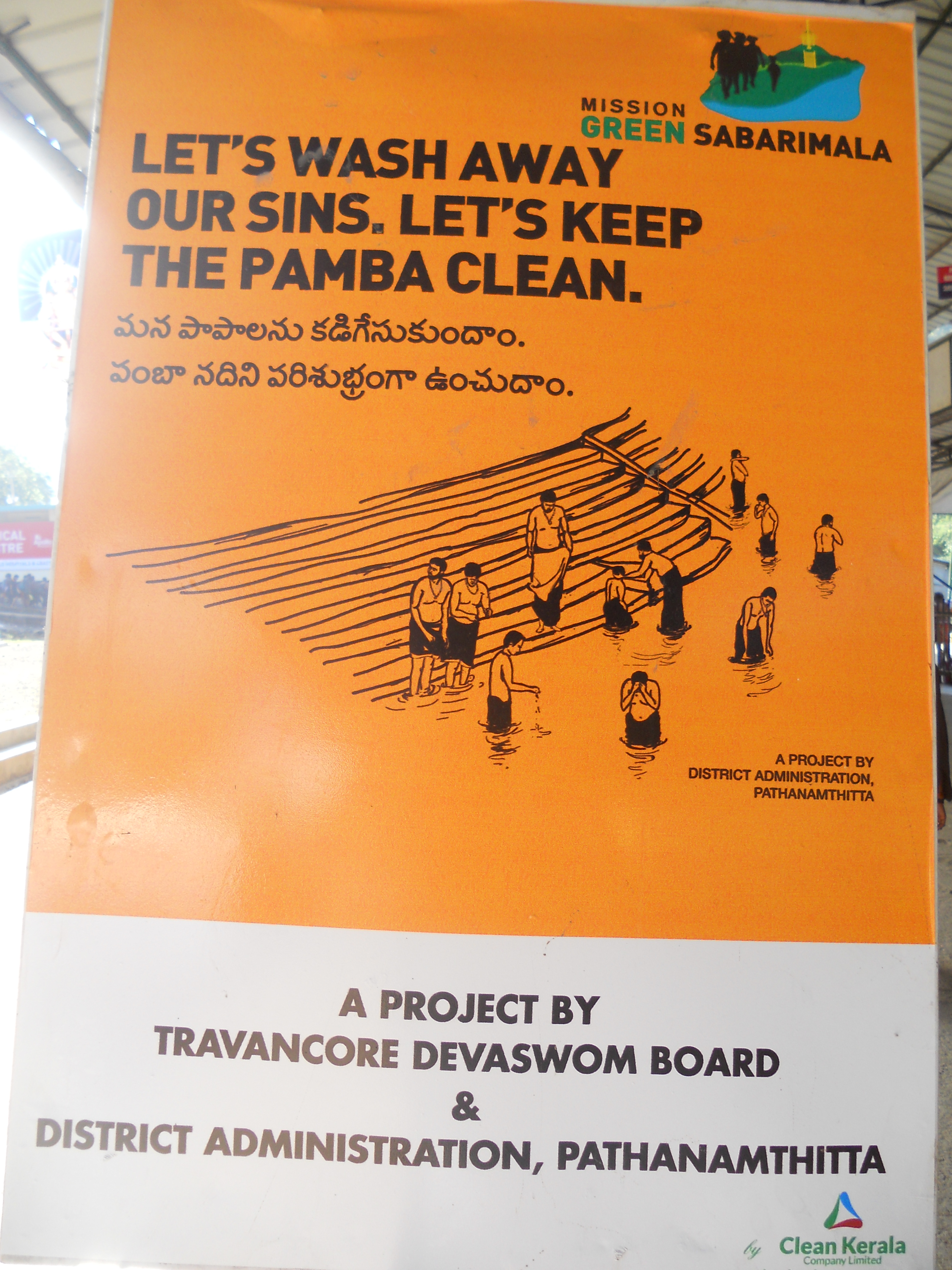
Information board near Nadappanthal, Sabarimala to keep Pamba clean

Due to drought and a lack of conservation and protection by the government, the Pampa River has shrunk to a stream and is totally dry in many places. Nearby wells have also dried up. Water for farming, such as paddy fields, is scarce. Experts are calling for governmental awareness of the dire situation and the need to rein in development that is destroying the environment.

The Kerala High Court has initiated steps to control the pollution of the river from the practice of some visitors to Sabarimala who throw their clothes into it. As part of the Punyam Poonkavanam project, pilgrims have been exhorted to avoid the usage of soap and oil while bathing in River Pamba. They are also requested not to throw any material, including clothes, to this holy river. At a broader level, this project aims to spread the message of cleanliness and greenness beyond Pamba and Sabarimala.

== Significance in Hinduism ==
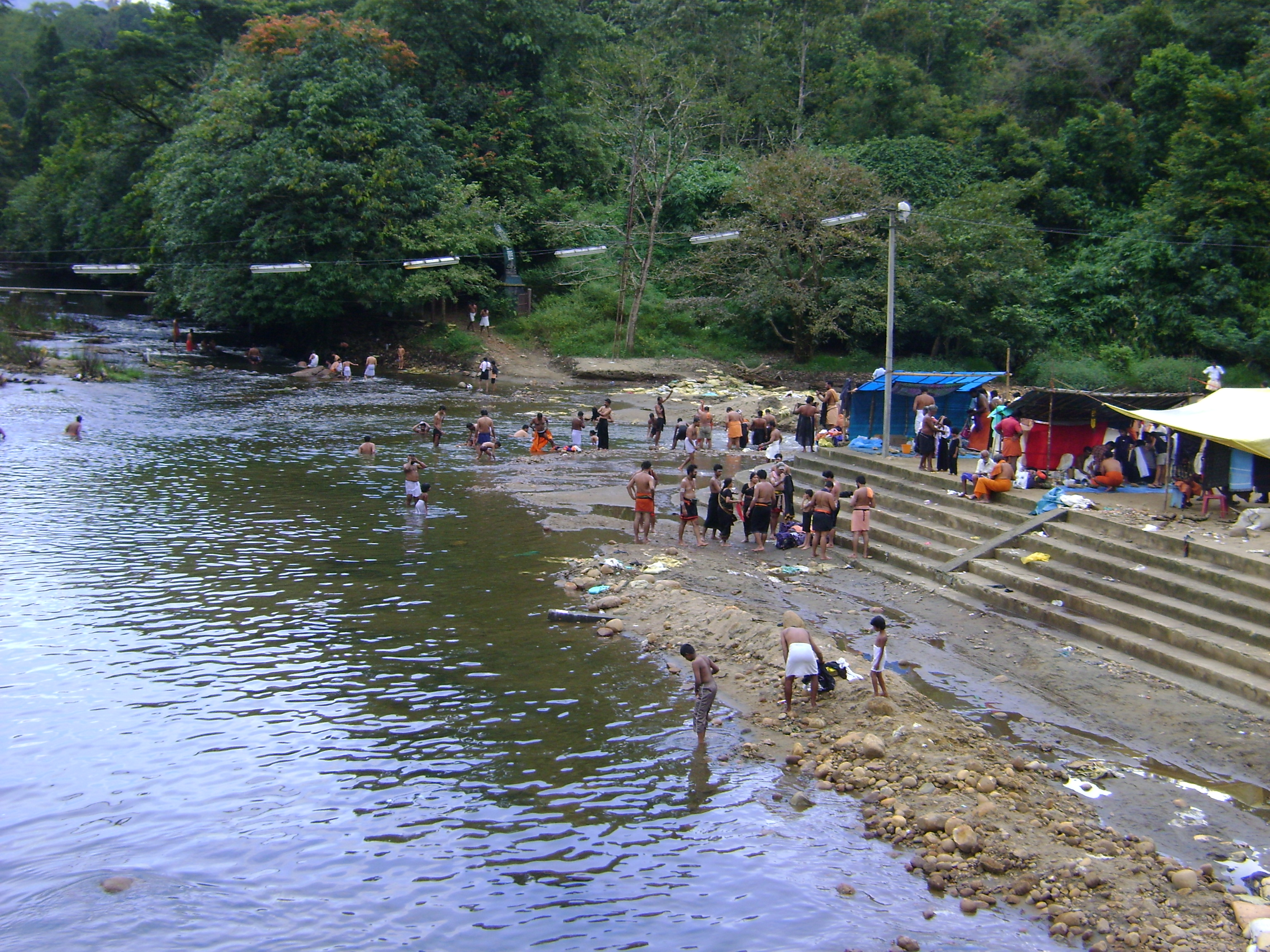
Pamba River near Sabarimala

Lord Ayyappan (Sri Dharmasastha) appeared to the Pandalam Raja as a child on the banks of the Pamba River. The Pamba River has been venerated as Ganga of Kerala, and devotees of Lord Ayyappan believe that immersing oneself in the Pamba is equivalent to bathing in the Holy Ganges River. Bathing in the river, believed to absolve one's sins, is a requirement before commencing the trek through the forest to the Ayyappan Temple atop Sabarimala. Pamba is also referenced in the Valmiki Ramayana, where Rama visited the elderly devotee Sabari. This connection led to the mountain being named Sabarimala, meaning "mountain of Sabari."

== Religious Conventions ==
Cherukolpuzha Convention, an important, annual Hindu convention, is held on the sand banks of Pamba in Cherukole. Maramon Convention, the largest Christian convention in Asia, is held in Maramon at the banks of the Pamba River.

== Boat Racing ==
Vallam kali, also known as snake boat race, are traditional boat races held in Kerala in the Punnamada Lake and surrounding rivers. The Champakulam Moolam Boat Race is one of the oldest vallam kali in Kerala dating back to 1545 A.D. The race is held in Champakulam on the Pamba River. The Aranmula Boat Race features palliyodams boats is an annual race held as past of Onam festival and Vallasadya festival in Aranmula.

== See also ==
- Melukara
- Ayroor
- Pathanamthitta District
- Ayyappa
- Aranmula Palace
- Sabarigiri Hydro Electric Project
- Chengannur
