= Perunthenaruvi Falls =

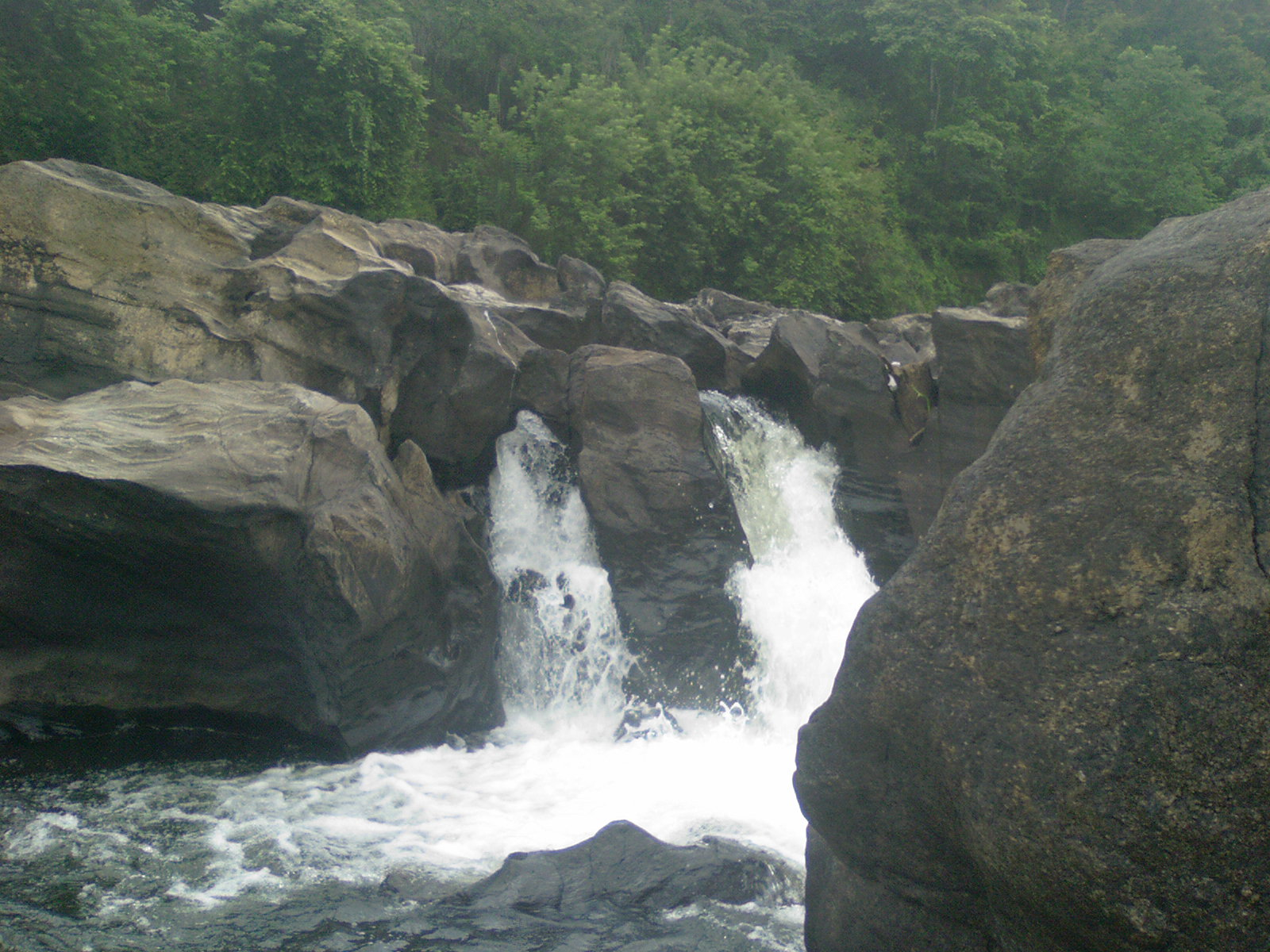
- Perunthenaruvi waterfalls near Vechoochira

- Location within Kerala
- Location: Vechoochira
- Coordinates: 9°24′47″N 76°52′35″E
- Type: Waterfall

Perunthenaruvi Waterfalls are waterfalls 36 km (22 mi) from Pathanamthitta in Pathanamthitta District, Central Travancore region, Kerala State, India. It is a popular tourist destination situated in Vechoochira Panchayat of Ranni taluk. The one shore of this waterfall is Kudamurutty and Vechoochira is the other. The main route to this waterfall starts from Ranni - Athikkayam - Kudamurutty - Perunthenaruvi.

== Etymology ==
The name Perunthenaruvi derived from the two Malayalam words Perunthen (great honey) and aruvi (stream).

== Location ==
Located on the Western Ghats of the Sahyadri Range, Perunthenaruvi is famous for the waterfalls there. The waterfalls are known for their wide area, rather than their height. It is located in Pathanamthitta district of Kerala state. The stream later unites with the Pamba River. It is beautiful and dangerous at the same time.

== Gallery ==
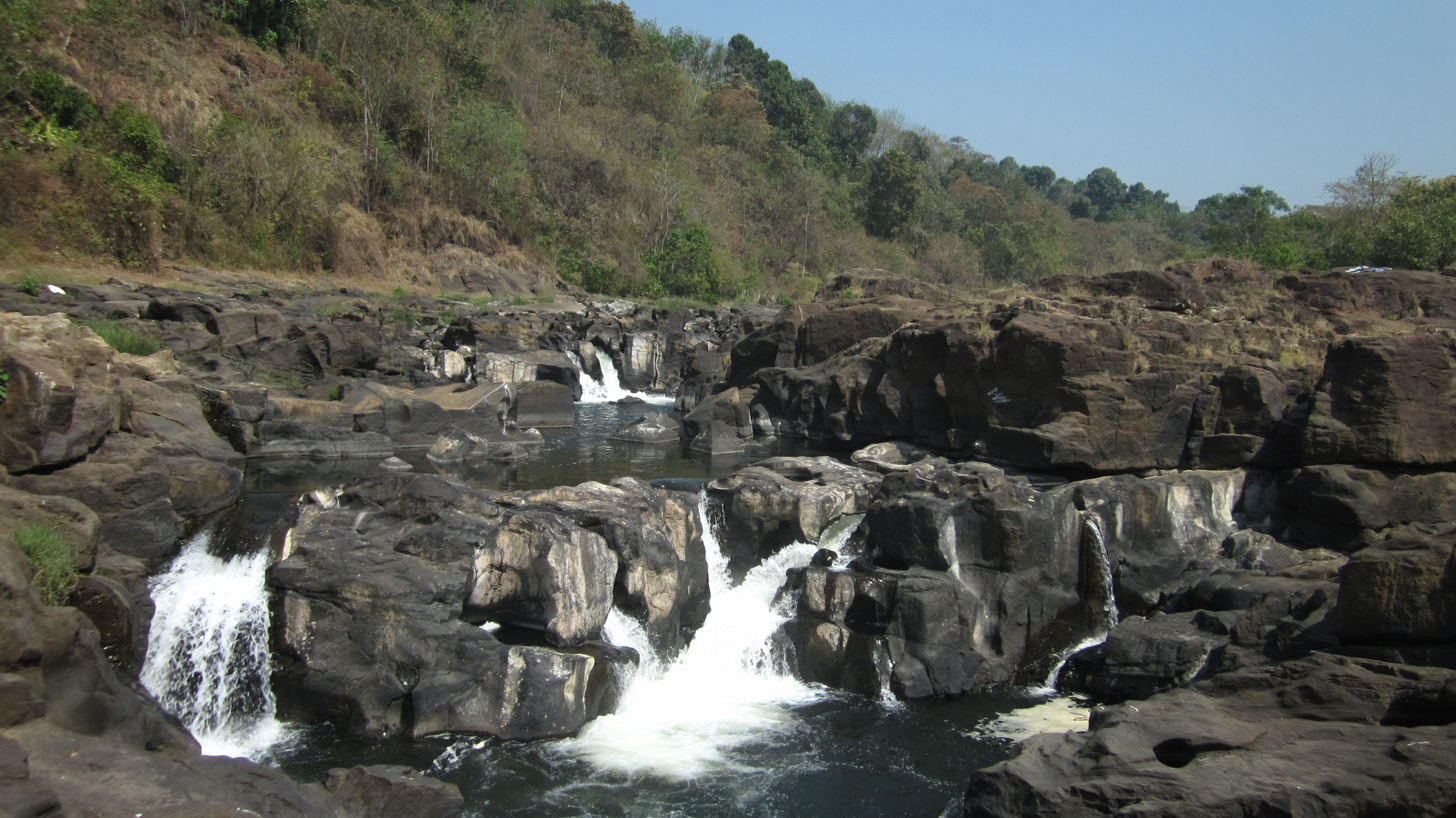

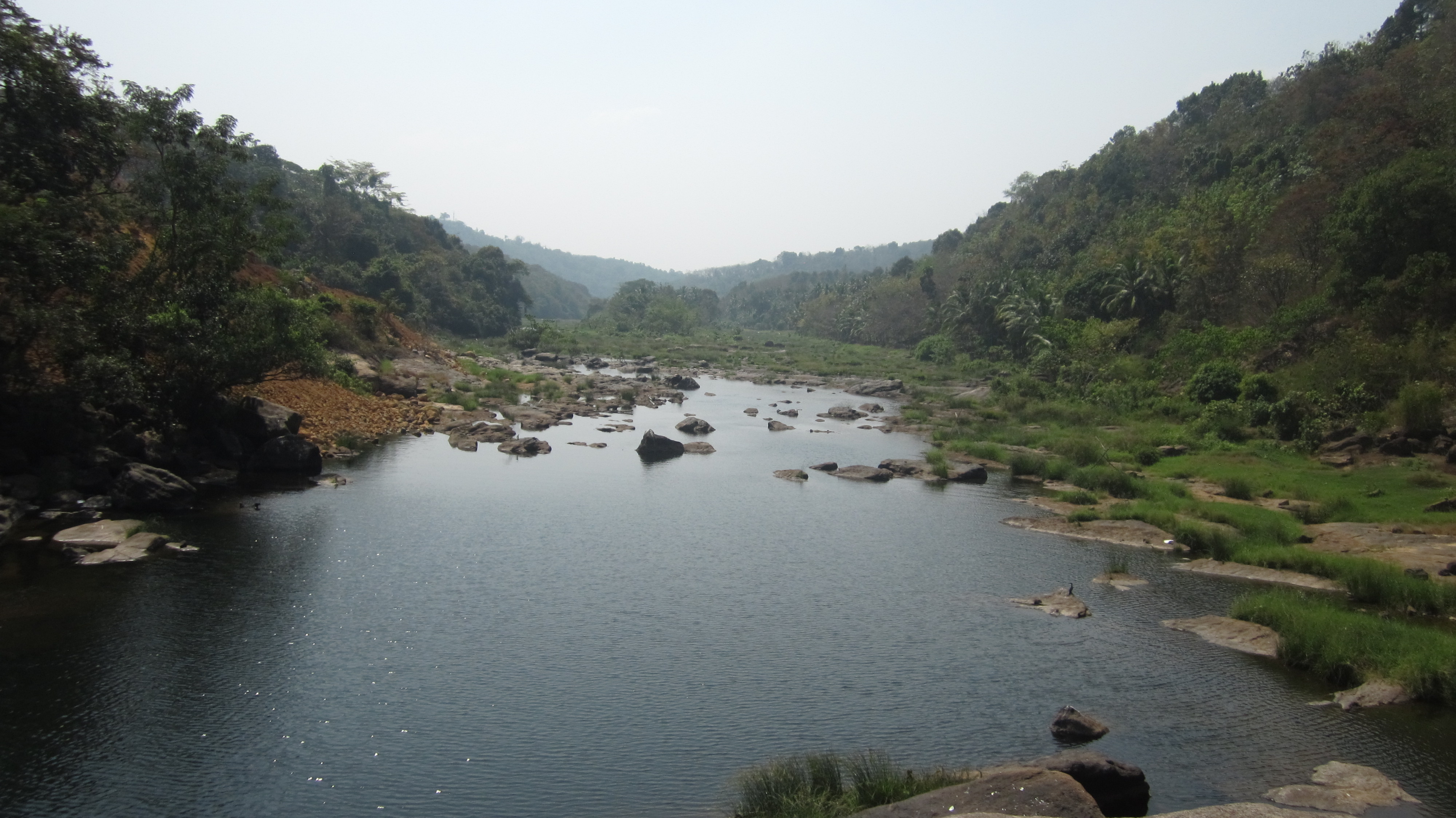

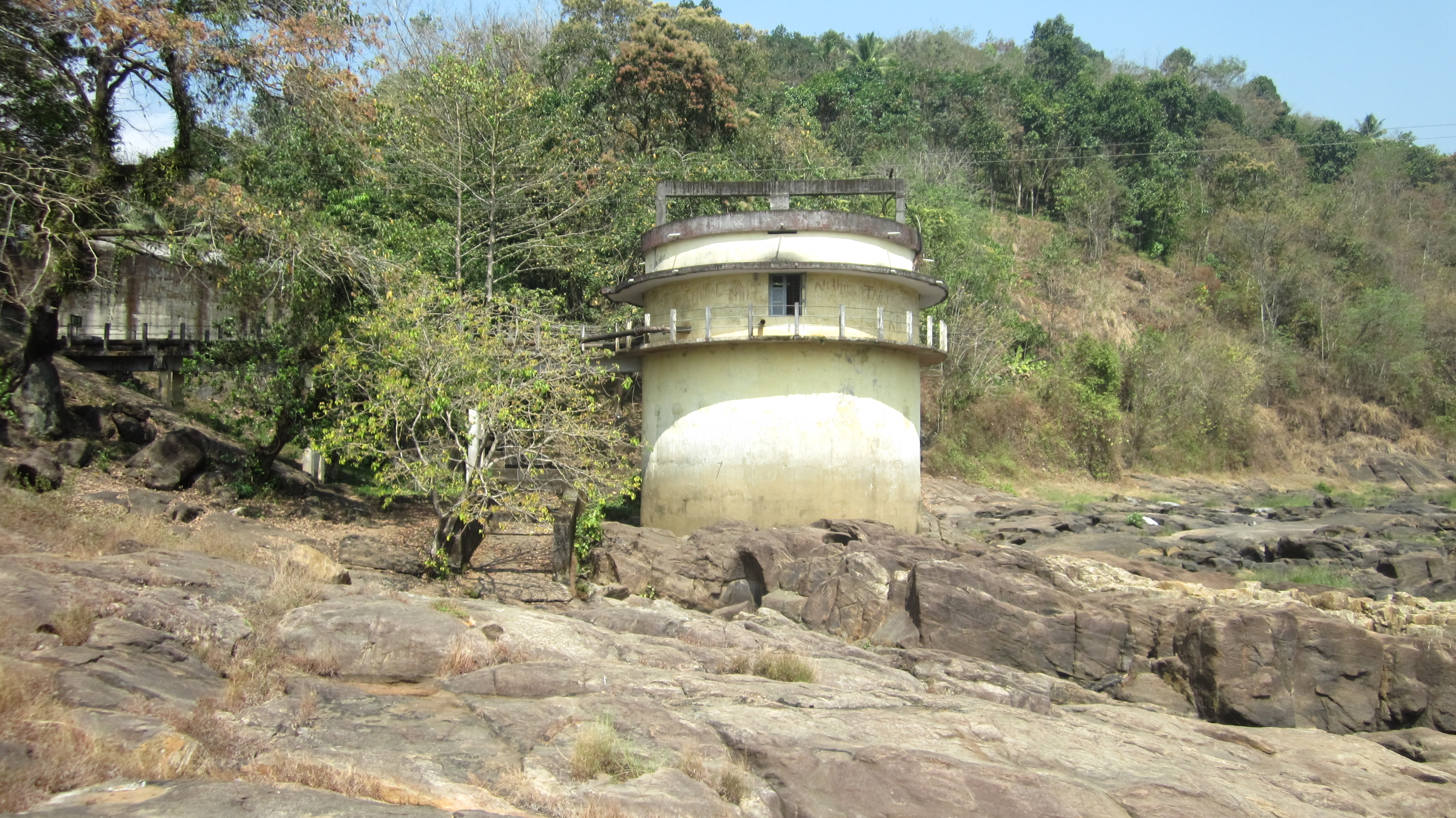

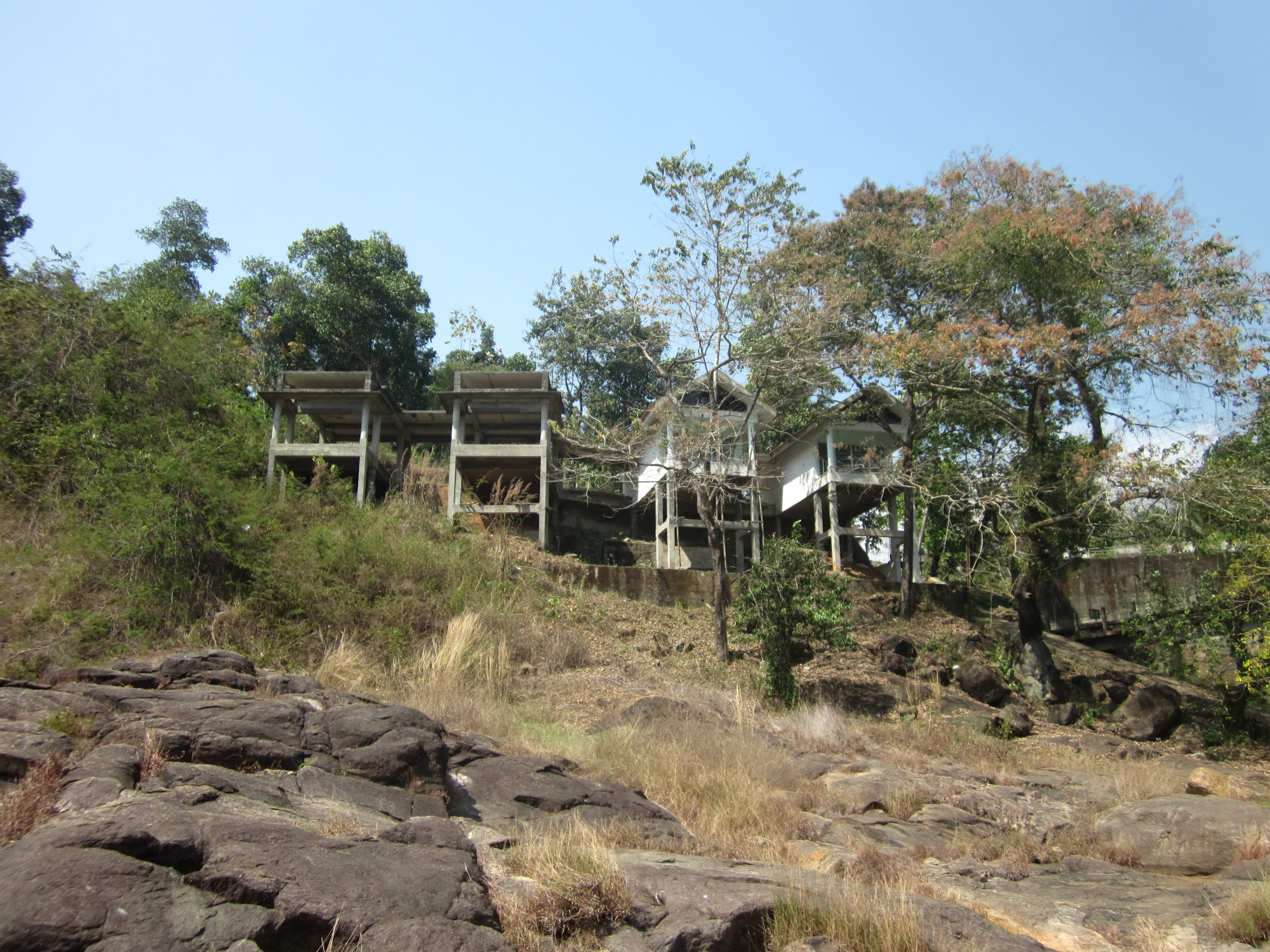

== See also ==
- List of waterfalls
- List of waterfalls in India
- Perunthenaruvi Project
