= Chathenkary =

Chathenkary ചാത്തങ്കരി Chathankary
- Village
- Chathenkary
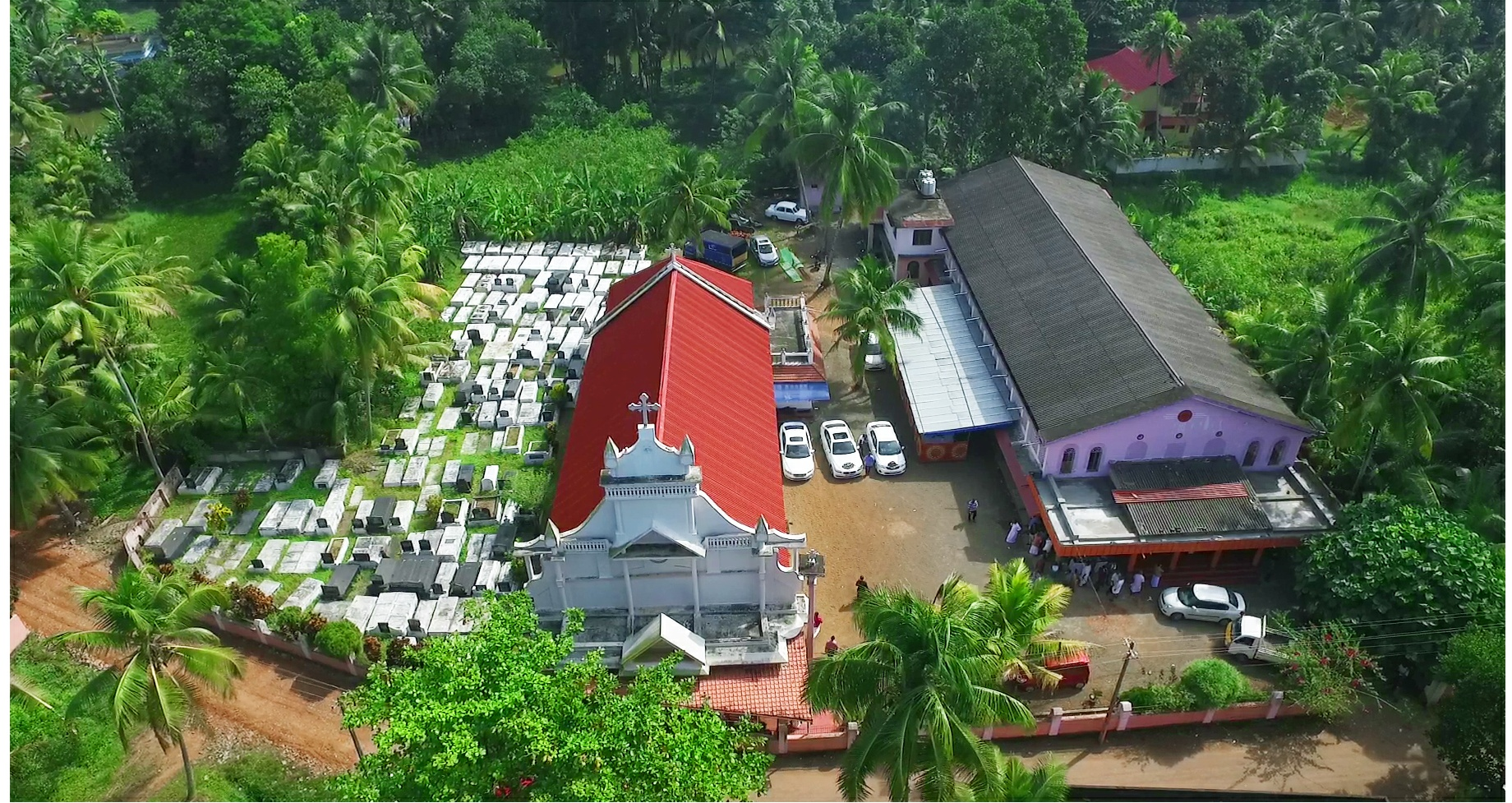
- Aerial view of St. Paul's Mar Thoma Church

- Location in Kerala, India
- Coordinates: 9°23′11.5″N 76°31′42.7″E
- Country: India
- State: Kerala
- District: Pathanamthitta
- Taluk: Thiruvalla

Government
  - Body: Peringara Grama Panchayat

Languages
  - Official: Malayalam, English
- Time zone: UTC+5:30 (IST)
- PIN: 689112
- Vehicle registration: KL-27
- Nearest city: Thiruvalla
- Lok Sabha constituency: Pathanamthitta
- Vidhan Sabha constituency: Thiruvalla

Chathenkary (also spelt Chathankary; Malayalam: ചാത്തങ്കരി) is a village in the Peringara gram panchayat of Thiruvalla taluk in the Pathanamthitta district of Kerala, India.

== Etymology ==
The name Chathenkary (Malayalam: ചാത്തങ്കരി) ends in -kary (കരി), a suffix shared by many place names in the Kuttanad region, such as Kainakary, Ramankary and Chennamkary. In Malayalam, kari means charcoal or black.

Parts of Kuttanad are known for their kari soils, which are deep black, rich in organic matter and often contain deeply buried, partly burnt pieces of ancient timber. Local folklore identifies the region with the Khandava forest of the Mahabharata, and stumps of large forest trees and partially decomposed wood have been found in the kari tracts, suggesting that the area was once forested.

== Geography ==
Chathenkary is a rural village in the Upper Kuttanad region, about 1.7 km (1.1 mi) west of Peringara and 6 km (3.7 mi) west of Thiruvalla. The village lies in the low-lying region between the Pamba and Manimala rivers. Like the rest of Kuttanad, the land lies at or slightly below sea level and consists largely of paddy fields (padasekharams) separated by canals and backwater channels, which leaves the area prone to flooding during the monsoon.

=== 2018 floods ===
Chathenkary was among the Upper Kuttanad villages affected by the 2018 Kerala floods. Heavy monsoon rain in July 2018 had already inundated the low-lying western areas of Pathanamthitta district, with Thiruvalla taluk reported as the worst-affected part of the district and Chathenkary named among the flooded areas along with Peringara, Mepral, Niranam and Nedumbram. The worst flooding came in mid-August, when the Pamba River reached its highest recorded level and peak discharge on 16 August 2018.

== Economy ==
Agriculture, mainly paddy cultivation, is the traditional occupation in the village.

== Religion ==
Places of worship in and around the village include:

- St. Paul's Mar Thoma Church (Chathenkary Central), a parish of the Mar Thoma Syrian Church
- St. Mathew's Mar Thoma Church (Chathenkary East, Vettiakonam)
- St. Mary's Malankara Catholic Church, Alumthuruthy (Chathenkary West)
- St. Joseph's Catholic Chapel (Chathenkary West)
- Sharon Fellowship Church (Chathenkary West), a Pentecostal congregation
- Chathenkary Sree Bhagavathi Temple, dedicated to the goddess Bhagavathi
- Chathenkary Sree Ardhanareeshwara Temple, dedicated to Ardhanarishvara

== Education ==
- Government LP School, Chathenkary
- Government New LP School, Chathenkary
- SNDP High School, Chathenkary

== Healthcare ==
- Community Health Centre, Chathenkary
- Manak Hospital, Chathenkary Mukku, on the Ambalappuzha–Thiruvalla road

== Transport ==
Chathenkary is connected by road to Thiruvalla and Changanassery, with KSRTC and private bus services. The nearest railway station is Thiruvalla, and the nearest airport is Cochin International Airport.

== Politics ==
Chathenkary is part of the Thiruvalla Assembly constituency and the Pathanamthitta Lok Sabha constituency.

== Notable people ==
- Mammen Mathai (1951–2003), member of the Kerala Legislative Assembly for Thiruvalla from 1991 until his death in 2003, representing the Kerala Congress (M)
- Adv. Elizabeth Mammen Mathai (born 1953), lawyer and widow of Mammen Mathai, who won the 2003 Thiruvalla by-election for the Kerala Congress (M) and served in the 11th Kerala Legislative Assembly
