= Muttumon =

Village in Pathanamthitta District, Kerala, India

Muttumon is a village in Koipuram panchayat. It is a part of Thiruvalla taluk and Pathanamthitta district and is considered a part of Kumbanad town. Pullad is just two km away. Muttumon is located on the Thiruvalla-Kumbazha highway, also known as Sh-07.
