= Atmananda Krishna Menon =

Indian philosopher (1883–1959)

- Born: P. Krishna Menon; 8 December 1883; Peringara, Kerala, India
- Died: 14 May 1959 (aged 75); Trivandrum, Kerala
- Occupations: guru and advaita philosopher

Śrĩ Atmananda (8 December 1883 – 14 May 1959), also referred as Sri Atmananda Krishna Menon, was an Indian sage, guru, and philosopher. He has been described by scholars as a "neo-Hindu". His teachings have become a foundation for a spiritual method called the Direct Path.

== Biography ==
=== Source materials ===
Nitya Tripta (S. Balakrishna Pillai), one of Menon’s disciples, included a detailed life sketch toward the end of a collection of Menon’s teachings. M.P.B. Nair, whose family became disciples when he was a child, included biographical material in his Rays of the Ultimate. Philip Renard included a biography in his “I” is a Door, a summary of the teachings of Ramana Maharshi, Nisargadatta Maharaj and Menon. N. Narayana Pilliai, Ph.D., included a biographical chapter in a book on Menon’s teachings concerning the direct path and “I”-principle.

=== Early life ===
He was born as P. Krishna Menon in 1883 at Cherukulathu House, in Peringara, near Tiruvalla, in the state of Travancore, now a part of Kerala.

After studying law, he became a Government Advocate and Inspector and District Superintendent of Police and remained in service until 1939.

=== Sadhana and realization ===
Meanwhile, his search for a guru led to his day-long meeting with Swami Yogananda (not to be confused with Paramahansa Yogananda) in 1919. In 1923, he assumed the name Sri Atmananda and started teaching Jnana Yoga. After retirement from government service, he resided in his family home, Anandavadi on the river Pampa in Malakara.

He died at Trivandrum (now known as Thiruvananthapuram) in 1959.

== Legacy ==
Menon's teachings have become a foundation for a spiritual method called the Direct Path. His disciple, Nitya Tripta (S. Balakrishna Pillai), compiled his teachings from 1950 to 1959 into a large volume titled Notes on the Spiritual Discourses of Sree Atmananda (of Trivandrum), which appeared in 1963.

Menon’s eldest son K. Padmanadbha Menon (Sri Adwayananda) continued his teachings from his home in Anandawadi, Malakkara, near Chengannur, until his own death in 2001. He authored several books himself, including Atmaswarupam.

Jean Klein, Francis Lucille, Rupert Spira and Stephan Bodian are prominent members of Menon’s spiritual lineage.

=== Publications ===
Menon published several books during his lifetime. Nitya Tripta (S. Balakrishna Pillai), one of his disciples, included a bibliography and publication history toward the end of a collection of Menon’s teachings.

Radhamadhavam was composed in 1919. A typed, spiral bound, English translation was copyrighted by John Levy in 1958. The title page states, “These verses were composed by the Author some 36 years ago ... . They are for private circulation only, and on no account are they to be published.” Nonetheless, according to Tripta, a corrected and approved version was ultimately published that same year. It was reprinted by Advaita Publishers in 1983.

Atmaramam was published in 1935. It has been described as “a continuation of Radhamadhavam in the ladder of spiritual progress.” Some stanzas have been translated into English in secondary sources.

Atma-Darshan was published in 1945 in Malayalam. An English translation, stated by Menon to be “my own free translation from the original Malayalam," appeared in 1946.

Atma-Nirvriti was published in 1951 in Malayalam. An English translation, described as “a free rendering of the Malayalam Poetical work of the same name by the author himself,” appeared in 1952.

The English editions of Atma-Darshan and Atma-Nirvriti were later published together in a single undated volume as Atmanadopanishat. Advaita Publishers issued a corrected edition in 1983 to mark the centenary of Menon’s birth.

After his death, Atmananda Tattwa Samhita, based on tape-recorded talks between Menon and some disciples, was published in 1973. The title page indicates that the book was compiled, edited and Malayalam portions translated by his son, K. Padmanadbha Menon.

M.P.B. Nair noted, “Sri Atmananda composed many verses and hymns in Malayalam, giving spiritual instructions to disciples and expounding the Truth from various angles of vision. Some of these are published, and some exist only in manuscript.” Nair included English translations of many of the latter in his Rays of the Ultimate, which was published in 1990. Nair stated, "[A]s His instrument I continue to narrate these anecdotes, to distribute the hoarded wealth I cherish, and to share it with others who are less fortunate in that they did not have the opportunity to listen to the great Master directly."

=== Recollections by Others ===
American mythologist Joseph Campbell sought out Menon during one of his trips to India in the 1950s. Campbell later recounted, "I wanted to meet a real, first-class master, and I didn’t want to hear any more slop about māyā and how you’ve got to give up the world and all that kind of thing. I’d had enough of that for about fifteen or twenty years." When Campbell eventually found Menon, he engaged him in a discussion about brahman. "Then [Menon] gave me a little meditation: 'Where are you between two thoughts?' That is to say, you are thinking all the time, and you have an image of your-self. Well, where are you between two thoughts? Do you ever have a glimpse beyond your thinking of that which transcends anything you can think about your-self? That’s the source field out of which all of your energies are coming."

== Works ==
- Atma Darshan (Malayalam and English). Advaita Publishers,1983.
- Atma Nirvriti (Malayalam and English), Advaita Publishers, 1983.
- Atmaramam (in Malayalam)
- Atmananda Tattwa Samhita: The Direct Approach to Truth as Expounded by Sri Atmananda. Advaita Publishers, 1983. ISBN 0914793187.
- Narayana Pillai, N. Atmananda Krishna Menon: Direct Path to Realization – 'I'-Principle. Trivandrum, India: Centre for South Indian Studies, 2019
