= Thiruvalla Assembly constituency =

Constituency of the Kerala legislative assembly in India

Thiruvalla
- Constituency No. 111 for the Kerala Legislative Assembly
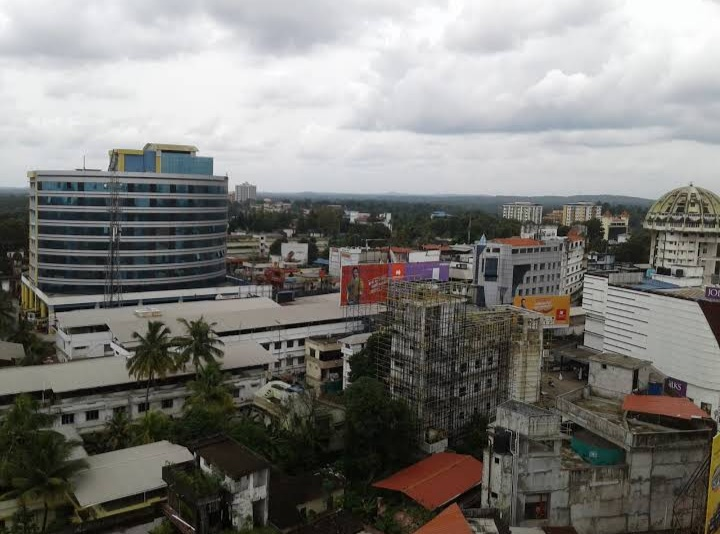
- Thiruvalla town

Constituency details
- Country: India
- Region: South India
- State: Kerala
- District: Pathanamthitta
- Established: 1957
- Total electors: 2,08,798 (2016)
- Reservation: None

Member of Legislative Assembly
- 16th Kerala Legislative Assembly
- Incumbent Varghese Mammen
- Party: Kerala Congress
- Alliance: UDF
- Elected year: 2026

Thiruvalla State assembly constituency is one of the 140 state legislative assembly constituencies in Kerala in southern India. It is also one of the seven state legislative assembly constituencies included in Pathanamthitta Lok Sabha constituency. The current MLA is Varghese Mammen of KEC(J) .

== Local self-governed segments ==
Thiruvalla Assembly constituency is composed of the following local self-governed segments:

Sl no.	Name	Status (Grama panchayat/Municipality)	Taluk
1	Thiruvalla	Municipality	Thiruvalla
2	Kadapra	Grama panchayat	Thiruvalla
3	Kaviyoor	Grama panchayat	Thiruvalla
4	Kuttoor	Grama panchayat	Thiruvalla
5	Nedumpuram	Grama panchayat	Thiruvalla
6	Niranam	Grama panchayat	Thiruvalla
7	Peringara	Grama panchayat	Thiruvalla
8	Anicadu	Grama panchayat	Mallappally
9	Kallooppara	Grama panchayat	Mallappally
10	Mallapally	Grama panchayat	Mallappally
11	Puramattam	Grama panchayat	Mallappally
12	Kunnamthanam	Grama panchayat	Mallappally

== Members of Legislative Assembly ==
The following list contains all members of Kerala Legislative Assembly who have represented the constituency:

Year	Member	Political party
1957	G. Padmanabhan Thampi	Communist Party of India
1960	P. Chacko	Indian National Congress
1967	E. John Jacob	Kerala Congress
1970	E. John Jacob	Kerala Congress
1977	E. John Jacob	Kerala Congress
1979 (Note: By-election)	P. C. Thomas Painummoottil	Janata Party
1980	P. C. Thomas Painummoottil	Janata Party
1982	P. C. Thomas Painummoottil	Independent politician
1987	Mathew T. Thomas	Janata Party
1991	Mammen Mathai	Kerala Congress (M)
1996	Mammen Mathai	Kerala Congress (M)
2001	Mammen Mathai	Kerala Congress (M)
2003 (Note: By-election)	Elizabeth Mammen Mathai	Kerala Congress (M)
2006	Mathew T. Thomas	Janata Dal (Secular)
2011	Mathew T. Thomas	Janata Dal (Secular)
2016	Mathew T. Thomas	Janata Dal (Secular)
2021	Mathew T. Thomas	Janata Dal (Secular)
2026	Varghese Mammen	Kerala Congress

== Election results ==
Percentage change (±%) denotes the change in the number of votes from the immediate previous election.

=== 2026 ===
2026 Kerala Legislative Assembly election: Thiruvalla
Party	Candidate	Votes	%	±%
KEC	Varghese Mammen	53,224	37.82	▲1.45
BJP	Anoop Antony	43,078	30.61	▲14.36
ISJD	Mathew T. Thomas	42,023	29.86	▼14.70
BSP	Ramesh Chathenkary	999	0.71	▼0.06
Independent	Thomas Mammen	553	0.39	New
Independent	Aju Alex	220	0.16	New
Independent	Zeen Thomas	144	0.10	New
NOTA	None of the above	504	0.36	▼0.08
Margin of victory		10,146	7.21	
Turnout		1,40,745	69.47%	▲6.13
KEC gain from JD(S)		Swing	▲1.45	

By Local body Segments
No.	Status (Local body)	Votes			Lead
No.	Status (Local body)	Varghese Mammen	Anoop Antony	Mathew T. Thomas	Lead
1	Kunnamthanam	5,000	2,631	2,619	2,369
2	Anikkadu	3,061	2,287	2,368	693
3	Mallappally	3,714	2,396	1,819	1,318
4	Kallooppara	3,598	2,019	2,359	1,239
5	Kaviyoor	2,964	1,759	2,115	849
6	Puramattom	1,754	1,278	1,468	286
7	Thiruvalla Municipality	16,739	14,089	12,792	2,642
8	Peringara	4,647	3,944	4,008	639
9	Nedumpram	1,512	2,531	2,389	142
10	Kuttoor	3,600	4,386	3,046	786
11	Kadapra	4,717	3,029	3,788	929
12	Niranam	3,113	1,953	2,406	707
	Postal Votes	1,283	776	806	477

=== 2021 ===
2021 Kerala Legislative Assembly election: Thiruvalla
Party	Candidate	Votes	%	±%
JD(S)	Mathew T. Thomas	62,178	44.56	▲3.28
KEC	Kunju Koshy Paul	50,757	36.37	New
BJP	Ashokan Kulanada	22,674	16.25	New
Independent	Thomas Mathew	1,461	1.05	New
BSP	Rajendra Das	1,074	0.77	▲0.25
NOTA	None of the above	608	0.44	▲0.11
Turnout		1,39,544	-	−
JD(S) hold		Swing	▲3.28	

=== 2016 ===
There were 2,08,798 registered voters in the constituency for the 2016 Kerala Assembly election.

2016 Kerala Legislative Assembly election: Thiruvalla
Party	Candidate	Votes	%	±%
JD(S)	Mathew T. Thomas	59,660	41.28	▼8.69
KC(M)	Joseph M. Puthussery	51,398	35.56	▼5.91
BDJS	Akkerman Kalidasan Bhattathiripad	31,439	21.75	−
BSP	Saji Kadampanad	756	0.52	▼0.67
NOTA	None of the above	479	0.33	−
SDPI	Simi M. Jacob	444	0.31	▲0.02
Independent	Cherian M. V.	366	0.25	
Margin of victory		8,262	5.72	▼2.78
Turnout		1,44,542	69.23	▲3.91
JD(S) hold		Swing	▼8.69	

=== 2011 ===
There were 1,93,874 registered voters in the constituency for the 2011 election.

2011 Kerala Legislative Assembly election: Thiruvalla
Party	Candidate	Votes	%	±%
JD(S)	Mathew T. Thomas	63,289	49.97	
KC(M)	Victor T. Thomas	52,522	41.47	
BJP	Rajan Moolaveetil	7,656	6.05	
BSP	Kurian Joseph	1,511	1.19	−
SUCI(C)	Radhamani S.	456	0.36	−
Independent	Niranam Rajan	439	0.35	−
Independent	P. K .Sukumaran	398	0.31	
SDPI	Sam Kutty Jacob	371	0.29	
Margin of victory		10,737	8.50	
Turnout		1,26,642	65.32	
JD(S) hold		Swing		

=== 2006 ===
There were 1,10,867 registered voters in the constituency for the 2006 election.

2006 Kerala Legislative Assembly election: Thiruvalla
Party	Candidate	Votes	%	±%
JD(S)	Mathew T. Thomas	28,874	40.6	
KC(M)	Victor T. Thomas	19,952	28.1	
Independent	Sam Eapen	14,300	20.1	
BJP	Madhu Parumala	6,842	9.6	
Independent	Subramanian Nampoothiri	376	0.5	
Independent	Adv. Mathew P. Thomas	350	0.5	
AIADMK	Ambalapuzha Nateshan	302	0.4	
Independent	Krishnan Kutty	137	0.2	
Margin of victory		8,922	12.5	
Turnout		71,137	64.2	
JD(S) gain from KC(M)		Swing		

=== 2001 ===
There were 1,15,694 registered voters in the constituency for the 2001 election.

2001 Kerala Legislative Assembly election: Thiruvalla
Party	Candidate	Votes	%	±%
KC(M)	Adv. Mammen Mathai	42,397	51.6	
JD(S)	Dr. Varghese George	32,336	39.4	
BJP	Adv. P. K. Vishnu Namboothiri	7,400	9.0	
Margin of victory		10,061	12.2	
Turnout		82,151	71.0	
KC(M) hold		Swing		

== See also ==
- 2016 Kerala Legislative Assembly election
- List of constituencies of the Kerala Legislative Assembly
- Pathanamthitta district
- Thiruvalla
