= Vanchimoottil Devi Temple =

- Temple
- Country: India
- State: Kerala
- District: Pathanamthitta
- Time zone: UTC+5:30 (IST)
- PIN: 689106
- Nearest city: Thiruvalla
- Lok Sabha constituency: Pathanamthitta
- Nearest Airport: Cochin International Airport Limited
- Website: thalayarvanchimoottildevitemple.com/poojas.html

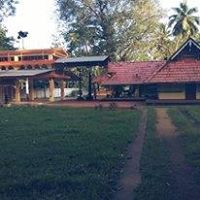
Vanchimoottil Devi Temple

Vanchimoottil Devi Temple is located in Kuttoor near Tiruvalla in Pathanamthitta district, Kerala, India. It is believed that the temple is more than 1000 years old. According to the local belief, about 1000+ years ago, the idol of "Devi" was brought to Thalayar village by flood waters and the idol got stuck to a tree. When the flood waters receded, local people spotted the idol, made of granite stone and they noticed a halo around the idol. The local people, who belonging to the Hindu Nair community, took the head of the Kuzhikattu Illam, the Brahmin family who are the Thantris of many a Temple in Kerala, to the spot. The Thantri took the idol to his illam or house, promptly installed and offered poojas as per thantric rules. Later, the idol was given back to the local people, and the idol was installed at the present site by the then head of Kuzhikattu Illam. A temple was constructed by the local people. Local people strongly believe the "Devi" or the "Vanchimoottil Amma" is the eternal mother of each and every individual of the village who guard them from all evil. It is a custom that people of the locality go to the temple and seek Amma's blessings before they embark on any new venture. Later on, the ownership of the temple was vested with N.S.S Karayogam, an organization of Nair Community. Even non-Hindus come to the temple for worship and there is no bar for members of other religions from entering the temple, provided they are properly dressed and clean. Wearing shirts and baniyan is not allowed inside the temple.

== Transport ==
=== Road ===
Kerala State Road Transport Corporation has a depot at Tiruvalla (station code: TVLA) which is one among the 29 major depots in the state. Its 4 km from Kuttoor. KSRTC operates long distance and interstate bus services from the Tiruvalla depot. KSRTC operates daily Interstate Airbus service to Bangalore from Tiruvalla. Private buses are operated from a Municipal Private Bus stand to various places such as: Mallappally, Kozhencherry, Ranni, Perunad, Manimala, Kottayam, Kayamkulam, Haripad, Mavelikkara, Ochira, Karunagapally, Thrikkunnapuzha, AayiramThengu, Kundara, Seethathodu, Chunkappara, Mundakkayam, Changanassery, and Chengannur. Thiruvalla KSRTC is the biggest depot in the district.

=== Rail ===
Tiruvalla railway station (station code: TRVL)and Chenagannur ( station code: CGNR ) railway station are near to Kuttoor. Thiruvalla railway station is the sole railway station in Pathanamthitta district. Both station are only 4 km from Kuttoor. Most trains stop here. Another major railway station is Kottayam railway station which is 25 km from Kuttoor.

=== Airport ===
The nearest airports are Cochin International Airport (105 km) and Trivandrum airport (126 km).
