= St Paul's Mar Thoma Church, Chathenkary =

St. Paul's Mar Thoma Church, Chathenkary
- സെൻ്റ് പോൾസ് മാർത്തോമ്മാ പള്ളി ചാത്തങ്കരി
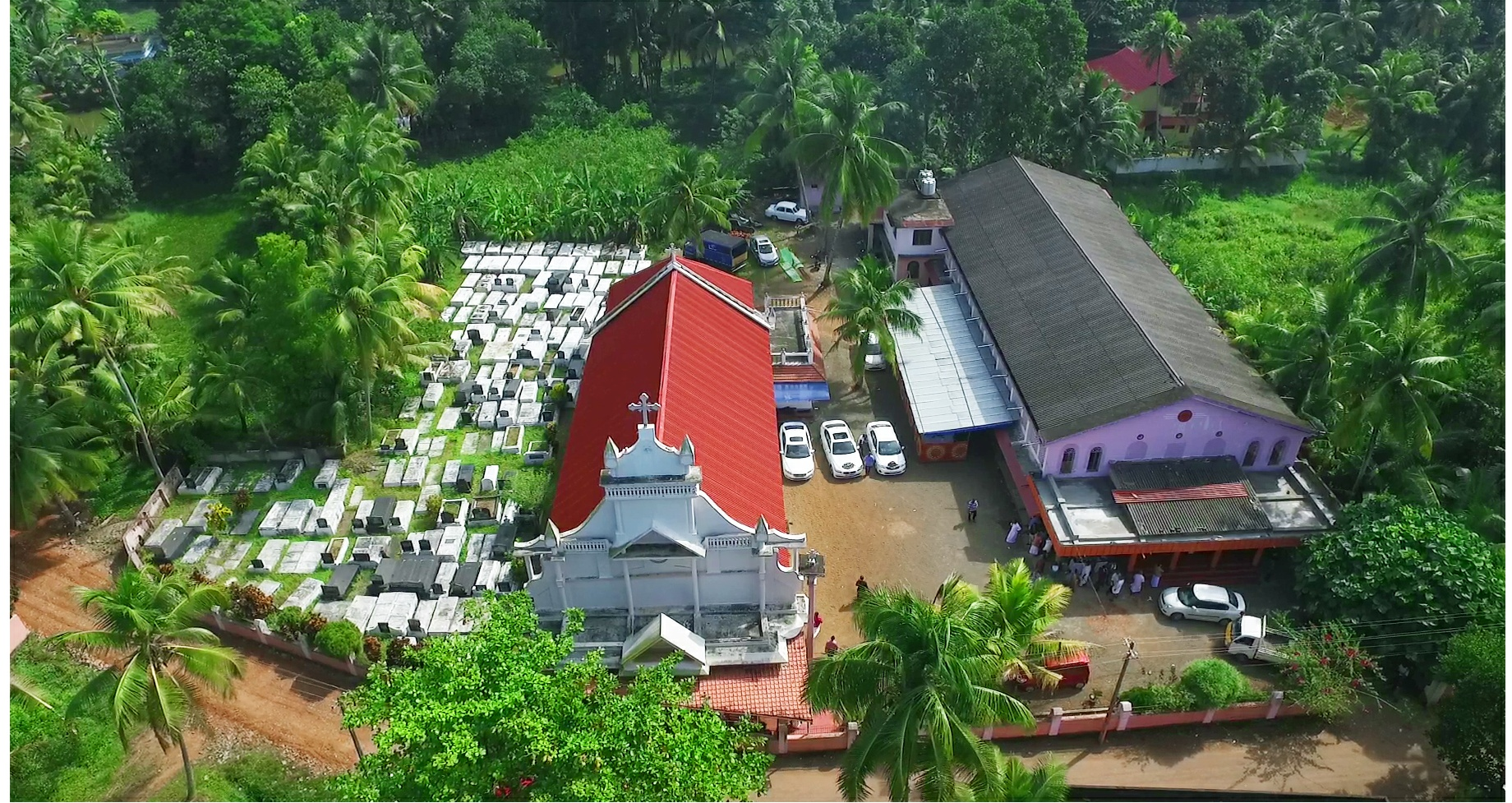
- St. Paul's Mar Thoma Church, Chathenkary
- 9.3877°N 76.5286°E
- Location: Chathenkary, Peringara, Thiruvalla, Pathanamthitta District, Kerala
- Country: India
- Denomination: Mar Thoma Syrian Church
- Tradition: Syrian

History
- Founded: 30 May 1902
- Dedication: St Paul
- Consecrated: 30 May 1902 (first church); 13 April 1957 (present church)

Architecture
- Style: Kerala traditional

Administration
- Diocese: Niranam Maramon Diocese

Clergy
- Vicar: George M. Kuruvilla

St. Paul's Mar Thoma Church, Chathenkary is a parish church of the Malankara Mar Thoma Syrian Church in Chathenkary, a small village in the Pathanamthitta district of the Central Travancore region in Kerala, India. As of 2026, the parish has 287 families and 1,207 members.

== History ==
In the early 20th century, Christian families in Chathenkary who supported the reform movement in the Malankara Church decided, under the leadership of Kovoor Iype Thoma Kathanar, to establish a Mar Thoma parish in the village. In November 1901 they bought the land on which the church stands for 351 rasi and registered the title deed. The first church was built within six months, and on 30 May 1902 it was consecrated in the name of Paul the Apostle by Titus I Mar Thoma Metropolitan. The parish began with 46 families. Kovoor Iype Thoma Kathanar served as its vicar from its founding until 1917.

As the congregation grew, the original building became too small, and a larger church was built. It was consecrated on 13 April 1957 by Juhanon Mar Thoma Metropolitan and Philipose Mar Chrysostom Episcopa.

The foundation stone of the parish hall in the church compound was laid on 19 January 1987 by Alexander Mar Thoma Metropolitan.

Further growth in membership, together with damage to the madbaha (sanctuary), led the parish to merge the old sanctuary into the nave and build a new madbaha with an adjoining office. The foundation stone was blessed on 29 April 2012 by Joseph Mar Thoma Metropolitan, and the new sanctuary and renovated church were consecrated on 15 April 2013 by Joseph Mar Thoma and Geevarghese Mar Athanasius Episcopa.

== See also ==
- Mar Thoma Syrian Church
