= Thirumalida Swayambhoo Shiva Temple =

- Thirumalida Swayambhoo Shiva Temple, Mallappally, Pathanamthitta, Kerala

Religion
- Affiliation: Hinduism
- District: Pathanamthitta
- Deity: Shiva
- Festival: Maha Shivaratri

Location
- Location: Mallappally
- State: Kerala
- Country: India
- Interactive map of Thirumalida Swayambhoo Shiva Temple
- Coordinates: 9°26′52.3″N 76°39′40.9″E

Architecture
- Type: Architecture of Kerala

Specifications
- Temple: One
- Elevation: 36.78 m (121 ft)

The Thirumalida Swayambhoo Shiva Temple is a Hindu Temple located in Mallappally in Pathanamthitta district in the southern part of Kerala, India.

It is similar to the great Kashi Vishwanath temple and the only swayambhoo Siva temple in Kerala facing west on the banks of a river, . Thousands of devotees gather here on Maha Shivaratri day. Mallappally kavadiyattam on the sandy shore of river Manimala is very famous.
