= Thuruthicadu =

- Village
- Location in Kerala, India Thuruthicadu (India)
- Coordinates: 9.4235°N 76.6505°E
- Country: India
- State: Kerala
- District: Pathanamthitta district

Languages
  - Official: Malayalam, English
- Time zone: UTC+5:30 (IST)
- PIN: 689597
- Telephone code: 0469
- Vehicle registration: KL-28

Thuruthicadu is a village in Kallooppara panchayat in Mallappally taluk and comes under Pathanamthitta district of Kerala state, India. It is situated 3 km from Mallappally and 3 km from Vennikulam. The nearest Indian Railways station is at Tiruvalla (13 km) and the nearest International airports are at Nedumbassery 110 km and Thiruvananthapuram 130 km.

== Educational institutions ==
Bishop Abraham Memorial or B.A.M College affiliated to Mahatma Gandhi University, Kottayam offers various undergraduate and post graduate courses. Govt U.P school offers education till 7th standard. There are several other primary schools run under various managements.

== Economy ==
The economy is basically agriculture based and major crops include rubber, pepper, tapioca. There is a high flow of remittance from NRIs. A branch of The Tiruvalla East Co-operative bank offers basic banking service in this village.

== Religion ==
Various sections of Christianity and Hinduism co-exist harmoniously. Followers of St. Thomas Evangelical Church of India, Mar Thoma Church, Oriental Orthodox church, Knanaya, Catholic Church, Pentecostal Churches, CSI church Anchilavu established as a school and Church in AD 1845 and Yuyomaya form major Christian sects.
