= Thiruvalla taluk =

Tiruvalla Taluk
- Taluk
- Location in Kerala, India
- Coordinates: 09.385°N 76.575°E
- Country: India
- State: Kerala
- District: Pathanamthitta
- Headquarters: Tiruvalla

Government
  - Type: Taluk
  - Body: Tehsildar

Area
  - Total: 154 km^{2} (59 sq mi)
- Elevation: 27 m (89 ft)

Population (2011)
  - Total: 323,503
  - Density: 2,100/km^{2} (5,440/sq mi)

Languages
  - Official: Malayalam, English
- Time zone: UTC+5:30 (IST)
- Postal code: 689 XXX
- Vehicle registration: KL-27

Thiruvalla Taluk (alternatively spelt Tiruvalla) is one among the 6 Taluks of the Pathanamthitta district in the Indian state of Kerala. The headquarters of the taluk is in Thiruvalla which covers an area of 154 sq. km and has a population of 3,23,503. Despite having 5.8% geographical area of the district, it holds over 27% of the population of the district.

== History ==
The Taluk is an older settlement of Brahmins and Syrian Christians, and has developed a cosmopolitan culture resulting from the peaceful co-existence of the two communities. The various places in Tiruvalla have a different history to tell.

For the history of the places in Tiruvalla, refer: History of Tiruvalla city, History of Niranam, History of Koipuram, History of Kumbanad, History of Kavumbhagom from the respective wiki articles.

== Famous personalities from the taluk ==
- Poykayil Yohannan , social activist, social reformer, poet and the founder of PRDS
- Vennikkulam Gopala Kurup, Poet (Mahakavi Vennikkulam Gopala Kurup )
- Abraham Kovoor, famous hypnotherapist and rationalist
- Abraham Mulamoottil, a Catholic priest, author, educationist, innovator, and philosopher
- Abu Abraham, famous cartoonist
- Babu Thiruvalla, movie director and producer
- Baselios Marthoma Didymos I, former Malankara Metropolitan & Catholicos of Malankara, India and All the East (Malankara Orthodox Church)
- Blessy (Blessy Iype Thomas), movie director
- C. K. Ra, famous artist
- C.P. Mathen (1890–1960), banker and founder of the Quilon Bank, Member of Parliament from Mavelikkara Constituency to the first Lok Sabha (1952), Indian Ambassador to the Sudan (1957)
- John Abraham, movie director
- K. G. George, movie director
- Kailash, movie actor
- Kakkanadan, novelist and writer
- Kaveri, movie actress
- Kaviyoor Ponnamma, movie actress
- Kaviyoor Sivaprasad, Film Director
- Kailash, movie Actor
- M. G. Soman, movie actor
- Dr. M.M. Thomas, former Governor of Nagaland, Chairperson of the World Council of Churchers (WCC)
- Mathew T. Thomas, MLA 2006–present, and 1987–1991, Janata Dal, former transport minister of Kerala (2006–2009)
- Meera Jasmine (Jasmine Mary Joseph), movie actress
- Nadiya Moythu, movie actress
- Nayantara (Diana Mariam Kurien, Kodiyattu), movie actress
- Parvathy (Ashwathy Kurup), movie actress
- Rajeev Pillai, model and movie actor
- Sidhartha Siva, Actor, Director

== Villages in Tiruvalla Taluk ==
- Tiruvalla
- Kadapra
- Kuttoor
- Peringara
- Nedumpuram
- Kaviyoor
- Koipuram
- Thottapuzhassery
- Eraviperoor
- Kavumbhagom
