= Kadapra-Koipuram =

Village in Pathanamthitta District, Kerala, India

Kadapra is a village in Koipuram Panchayath of Pathanamthitta District, Kerala, India. The main attraction of Kadapra is the "Varaal Chaal" which is a paradise of most delicious fishes and aquatic species. Other attractions of Kadapra are the Public Library, 100 Years Old MTLP School, Malanada Temple, and many churches.
