= Rupert Spira =

English author, philosopher, and potter

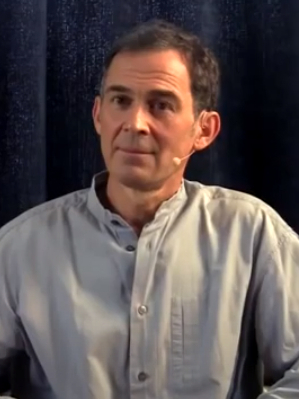
- Born: 13 March 1960 (age 66); London, England
- Occupations: Author, philosopher, potter
- Writing career
- Subjects: Spirituality, nonduality, philosophy, metaphysics, mysticism
- Website: rupertspira.com

Rupert Spira (/ˈspaɪrə/; born 1960) is an English philosopher, author and potter, based in Oxford, UK. He is a proponent of nonduality and what he terms 'the Direct Path'.

== Artistic education and apprenticeship ==
Just prior to beginning his formal spiritual exploration, Spira attended a retrospective exhibition by the studio potter Michael Cardew at Camberwell Arts Centre in London. His encounter with Cardew's work inspired him to abandon the scientific path he was on and begin studying with the brushwork potter Henry Hammond at West Surrey College of Art and Design in 1977 and, aged eighteen, to take an apprenticeship with Michael Cardew, then aged eighty, at Wenford Bridge Pottery from 1980 to 1982. He graduated from West Surrey College of Art and Design with a BA in 1983.

== Ceramic artist ==
Medium size open poem bowl (43 cm × 38 cm × 12 cm)

Medium white glaze bowl (35 cm × 26 cm × 14 cm)

In 1984, Spira opened his own studio at Lower Froyle in Hampshire. His early wheel-based pottery work reflects the influence of the traditional Bernard Leach utilitarian style. This work was mostly practical in nature, taking the form of teapots, vases, vessels, plates and other culinary ware.

In 1996, he set up his own pottery at Church Farm in Shropshire, described in a profile in The Guardian as a "potter's paradise". Here his style changed from a functional to a more minimalist, finer, more complex style ranging in size from miniature to large-scale. While he continued to make and sell functional pottery, he became known for his studio pottery.

His best and most recognisable work contains poems, both self-written and by Kathleen Raine the celebrated British poet. The poems are either scratched into the glaze in the sgraffito style or written as embossed letters either in a square block or in a single line across the surface of the vessel. These works vary in size from small prayer bowls only a few centimetres across through to huge, open bowls 50 cm or more in diameter.

He is also known for his cylinders which are often made as part of a series and while each stands alone, are meant to be exhibited as a group. These also vary in scale from a few centimetres high through to the largest being a meter or more tall. He works in a limited palette, mainly simple white, off-white and black monochromes but he does also occasionally make deep, red-glazed bowls and bright yellow tea sets.

Following in the tradition of artists such as Paul Cézanne and William Blake, Spira considers art to be a sacred activity: "A bowl is a sacred transmission. Its potency lies in its capacity to evoke in us the visceral memory of its infinite reality. This potency invites us to participate in its being."

In 2004, his work was documented in Bowl, published by the Sainsbury Centre for Visual Arts which featured a foreword by David Attenborough and collection of essays including one by the leading English potter and writer Edmund de Waal.

After being active as a potter for over 30 years, Spira closed his studio in 2013 to focus on speaking and writing about Non-dualism. In 2015, a major retrospective of his works at The Oxford Ceramics Gallery – Rupert Spira: A Life in Ceramics – bought together pieces from every stage of Spira's career. According to the Oxford Ceramics Gallery, Spira is "...among the finest ceramicists of his generation, known for his elegant tableware, his undulating open bowls, his eloquent groupings of slender cylinder vessels and his unique poem bowls".

His work can be found in private and public collections throughout the world, including the V&A, the Fitzwilliam Museum, the Sainsbury Centre for Visual Arts and the National Museum of Modern Art, Tokyo.

== Sharing the non-dual understanding ==
Spira cites his spiritual journey as starting when, aged fifteen, he first discovered the work of the 13th-century Persian poet Rumi. Following in his parents' footsteps, he started studying at Colet House in London at the age of seventeen under Dr Francis Roles (himself a student of Ouspensky and Gurdjieff and the Advaita Vedanta teacher Swami Shantananda Saraswati). In tandem with his life as a ceramic artist, Spira thus began a twenty year period of study and meditation practice in the classical Advaita Vedanta tradition.

He also continued to investigate Sufism through the art of Mevlevi Turning, a form of sacred movement combining prayer and meditation. During this time he also immersed himself in the teachings of Sri Nisargadatta Maharaj and Ramana Maharshi and, in the late 1970s, he attended the last teachings Jiddu Krishnamurti gave at Brockwood Park.

In 1997, Spira met his main teacher Francis Lucille, who introduced him to the teachings of Atmananda Krishna Menon and the Tantric tradition of Kashmir Shaivism (which Lucille had received from his teacher Jean Klein). These teachings form the basis of Spira's 'Direct Path' non-dual approach to spiritual awakening.

In his writings on non-duality, Spira summarises his approach in the following way: "Non-duality is the recognition that underlying the multiplicity and diversity of experience there is a single, infinite and indivisible reality, whose nature is pure consciousness, from which all objects and selves derive their apparently independent existence. The recognition of this reality is not only the source of lasting happiness within all people; it is the foundation of peace between individuals, communities and nations". In essence, Spira shares that happiness, or 'enlightenment', can be found if one can identify with the essential nature of our being – pure consciousness – that lies beyond feelings and thoughts. For Spira, "The greatest discovery in life is that our essential nature does not share the limits or the destiny of the body and mind".

His work has been featured in the media in the UK on both BBC Radio 4 and The Guardian.

== Selected public collections ==
- Victoria and Albert Museum
- Sainsbury Centre for Visual Arts

== Works ==
=== Ceramics Publications, Catalogues and Films ===
- Rupert Spira Ceramics, Japan Touring Exhibition, 2003–2004
- River of Words, a short film by Helen Miller, commissioned by Lisa Sainsbury to accompany Spira's 2004 Japanese Touring Exhibition. Published on Vimeo in 2015.
- Bowl, Sainsbury Centre for Visual Arts, 2004
- Rupert Spira: A Life in Ceramics, Oxford Ceramics Ltd, 2015. Published online on The Oxford Ceramics Gallery website.

=== Non-Duality Publications ===
- The Transparency of Things: Contemplating the Nature of Experience, Non-Duality Press, 2008
- Presence, Volume I: The Art of Peace and Happiness, Non-Duality Press, 2011
- Presence, Volume II: The Intimacy of All Experience, Non-Duality Press, 2011
- The Ashes of Love: Sayings on the Essence of Non-Duality, Non-Duality Press, 2013
- The Light of Pure Knowing: Thirty Meditations on the Essence of Non-Duality, Sahaja Publications, 2014
- Transparent Body, Luminous World: The Tantric Yoga of Sensation and Perception, Sahaja Publications, 2016
- The Nature of Consciousness, Sahaja Publications, 2017
- Being Aware of Being Aware – The Essence of Meditation Series, Volume I, Sahaja Publications, 2017
- A Meditation on I Am, Sahaja Publications, 2021
- The Essential Self, Sahaja Publications, 2021
- Being Myself – The Essence of Meditation Series, Volume II, Sahaja Publications, 2021
- You Are the Happiness You Seek: Uncovering the Awareness of Being, Sahaja Publications, 2022
- I Am Always I, Sahaja Publications, 2023
- The Heart of Prayer – The Essence of Meditation Series, Volume III, Sahaja Publications, 2023
