= Keezhuvaipur =

- Town
- Location in Kerala, India Keezhuvaipur (India)
- Coordinates: 9.4318°N 76.6697°E
- Country: India
- State: Kerala
- District: Pathanamthitta
- Elevation: 3 m (9.8 ft)

Languages
  - Official: Malayalam, English
- Time zone: UTC+5:30 (IST)
- PIN: 689587
- Telephone code: 0469
- Vehicle registration: KL 28

Keezhvaipur is a village in the Mallappally Taluk which is one of five Taluks that makes up the Pathanamthitta district, in Kerala State, India. It Is Part Of Thiruvalla Constituency.Keezhuvaipur lies in the bank of river Manimala and is famous for its traditions, cultures, and customs. The town is located on the Kottayam-Punalur State Highway. Keezhuvaipur is 3 km away from Mallappally, 11 km from Kozhencherry and 13 km from Tiruvalla.

Keezhuvaipur is a typical Central Tranvancore village with rubber tree plantations, paddy fields and many NRIs (Non-Resident Indians).

Also Keezhuvaipur has the only police station in the Mallappally Taluk. The Pincode of the town is 689587.

== Etymology ==
7 kilometers distance between vaipur and Keezhvaipur. Both are banks of river Manimala. In olden days, Vaipur and Chunkappara and nearby places under the police station limit of Keezhvaipur. Vaipur, which is located north of Keezhuvaipur, was very famous in trade in the ancient days. Keezh means 'below'. Keezhvaipur was also famous for its trading links as it had a small port to receive goods(hence the name Keezhvaip-pur,"keezh" meaning 'down' and vaip meaning "keeping" as items were kept down on the ground in the port) by the Manimala river, mainly from bigger towns like Chegenacherri. As it lies below to Vaipur, thus it got the name Keezhuvaipur.

== Geography ==
Keezhuvaipur town is located in central Kerala at a location of . The river Manimala flows through Keezhuvaipur. It has an average elevation of 3 metres (9 feet) from sea level. Keezhuvaipur is situated in the basin of the Manimala River which is formed from several streams in the Western Ghats in Idukki district. It flows through Pathanamthitta district and joins Pamba River. As per division of places in Kerala as Highlands, Midlands and Lowlands based on altitude, Keezhuvaipur is considered to be part of the Midlands. The general soil type is alluvial soil. The vegetation is mainly tropical evergreen and moist deciduous type.

== Transportation ==
Keezhvaipur lies in the SH 9 which connects the district capitals of Pathanamthitta and Kottayam. Both KSRTC and private buses travel between Kozhencherry and Kottayam. The nearest KSRTC terminal is Mallappally (2 km). Autorikshaws and taxi are plentiful from Keezhvaipur for travel to remote places.

The nearest railway station is Tiruvalla (13 km) and Chengannur (18 km). The nearest airport is Cochin International Airport (101 km). Upcoming Aranmula International Airport is just 15 km away.

== Climate ==
Keezhuvaipur has a tropical climate. Its proximity to the equator results in little seasonal temperature variation, with moderate to high levels of humidity. Annual temperatures range between 20 and 35 °C (68 and 95 °F). From June through September, the south-west monsoon brings in heavy rains as Keezhuvaipur lies on the windward side of the Western Ghats. From October to December, Keezhuvaipur receives light rain from the northwest monsoon, as it lies on the leeward side. Average annual rainfall is 315 cm. Although the summer is from March to May, it receives locally developed thundershowers in May.

== Politics ==
Keezhuvaipur is a part of Thiruvalla Assembly Constituency and Pathanamthitta Loksabha Constituency. Adv. Mathew T Thomas is the current MLA. In Lok sabha, Keezhuvaipur is represented by the sitting MP from Pathanamthitta, Mr. Anto Antony (Indian National Congress). In Rajya sabha, Keezhuvaipur is represented by the sitting MP from Keezhvaipur itself, Mr. Prof. P J Kurien (Indian National Congress).

== Education ==
Schools in the town include:

1. Govt Vocational Higher Secondary School.
2. Mallappally Marthoma English Medium School.
3. MTLP School Neithelipadi, Keezhvaipur.
4. Kizhakekkara LP School, Keezhvaipur.
5. Bishop Abraham Memorial College is the nearest college, which is just 10 km away from the town.

== Religion ==
The majority of the population is either Christian or Hindu. There are five Marthoma churches and one CSI and Pentecost churches, as well as two Hindu Temples, Subramanium and Shiva.

=== Churches ===
1. New India Church of God, Keezhuvaipur.
2. Church of God (Full Gospel) In India, Perumprammavu
3. Church of God (Full Gospel) In India, Town Church, near Police Station
4. Assemblies of God Church
5. Jerusalem Mar Thoma Church, Keezhuvaipur
6. St. Thomas Mar Thoma Church, Keezhuvaipur
7. Mallappally Mar Thoma Church, Keezhuvaipur
8. Mar Thoma Church, Parakathanam, Keezhuvaipur
9. Karuthamangal St. Paul's Mar Thoma Church, Narakathani, Keezhvaipur
10. St. Andrew's C.S.I Church, Keezhuvaipur
11. St. Thomas Evangelical Church Of India, Keezhuvaipur
12. CMS Anglican Church, Keezhvaipur
13. Ebenezer church, Indian Pentecostal church of god (IPC), Keezhuvaipur

=== Temples ===
1. Subramania Swamy Temple
2. Easwaramangalam Mahadeva Temple

== Hospitals ==
- Rev. George Mathen Mission Hospital, the hospital nearest to Keezhvaipur
- Primary Health Centre, Keezhvaipur
- Govt. Ayurveda Hospital, Keezhvaipur
- Govt. Homeopathic Hospital, Keezhvaipur
