= Mepral, Kerala =

Mepral
- Ward
- Location in Kerala, India Mepral (India)
- Coordinates: 9.399556°N 76.529876°E
- Country: India
- State: Kerala
- District: Pathanamthitta

Languages
  - Official: Malayalam, English
- Time zone: UTC+5:30 (IST)
- Postal code: 689591
- Vehicle registration: KL-27 (Thiruvalla)

Mepral is a ward of the Peringara panchayath, Peringara gram panchayat in the Thiruvalla taluk, Thiruvalla Revenue Division of Pathanamthitta district, Kerala. The ward is located at the tri-junction of the borders of Pathanamthitta district, Kottayam district, and Alappuzha district.

Mepral is a primarily rural area. The area mainly consists of low-lying paddy fields irrigated by the Manimala.
