= Pottanmala =

Pttanmala
- Village
- Location in Kerala, India Pttanmala (India)
- Coordinates: 12°9′0″N 75°18′0″E
- Country: India
- State: Kerala
- District: Pathanamthitta district

Languages
  - Official: Malayalam, English
- Time zone: UTC+5:30 (IST)
- PIN: 689106
- Telephone code: 0469
- Nearest city: Thiruvalla
- Lok Sabha constituency: Pathanamthitta
- Vidhan Sabha constituency: Thiruvalla

Pottanmala is a place in Kuttoor village in the Indian state of Kerala. Kuttoor panchayathu is under Thiruvalla, Pathanamthitta. Pottanmala is a historical place and the name came from the relation with Dritharashtra. It was formally known as Dritharashtramala.

== Demographics ==
At the 2001 India census, Kuttoor had a population of 18,433.
