= Eraviperoor =

- village
- Location in Kerala, India Eraviperoor (India)
- Coordinates: 9°22′57″N 76°38′20″E
- Country: India
- State: Kerala
- District: Pathanamthitta

Population (2011)
  - Total: 25,172

Languages
  - Official: Malayalam, English
- Time zone: UTC+5:30 (IST)
- PIN: 689542
- Vehicle registration: KL-27 THIRUVALLA
- Website: www.eraviperoor.com

Eraviperoor or Eravery is a village in Thiruvalla taluk, Pathanamthitta district in the state of Kerala. Eraviperoor is the part of Thiruvalla Taluk in east location and is part of the Aranmula legislative assembly constituency. It comes under Thiruvalla sub-district. Located at 8 km distance from Thiruvalla sub-district headquarter and NH 183 in Thiruvalla city India.

== Demographics ==
As of 2011 India census, Eraviperoor had a population of 25,172 with 11,699 males and 13,473 females. This village is a 'Panchayat' & in the Aranmula legislative assembly by way of its administrative status within the District of 'Pathanamthitta' in central Keralam state of India. It has become the first grama panchayat in Kerala to provide free WiFi for the general public.

== Transportation ==
Eraviperoor was among the early areas in central Travancore to receive motor-bus transportation. The Kozhencherry–Changanassery Motor Service (KCMS) (Edavamvelil Valiathannickal family (V.Mathai and brothers) of Sankaramangalam )operated bus services through the Eraviperoor and surrounding areas, connecting the locality with important centres such as Kozhencherry, Thiruvalla and Changanassery. KCMS was one of the early private motor-bus services in the region and played an important role in the development of road transportation in and around Eraviperoor.

KCMS as an eight-seater bus service operating between Kozhencherry and Changanassery, with buses running in both directions roughly once every two hours during the daytime

== Origin of name ==
Eraviperoor Means Eravi's Land. Also known as "ഈരവിയുടെ പെരിയ ഊര്". The region ruled by Eravi were known by this name, later it was changed into Eravipuram " ഈരവിപുരം". After many centuries the name was changed to Eraviperoor "ഇരവിപേരൂര്‍". Recently, short name of the place is called, Eravery "ഇരവേരി"

== Near Places ==
Puramattom Kumbanad Pullad Vennikulam Thiruvalla
