= Pullad =

- Town
- Location in Kerala, India Pullad (India)
- Coordinates: 9°21′18″N 76°40′24″E
- Country: India
- State: Kerala
- District: Pathanamthitta
- Taluk: Tiruvalla

Government
  - Body: Koyipram Grama Panchayat

Population
  - Total: 26,425

Languages
  - Official: Malayalam, English
- Time zone: UTC+5:30 (IST)
- Postal code: 689548
- Telephone Code: 0469
- Vehicle registration: KL-27
- Nearest town: Tiruvalla
- Lok Sabha constituency: Pathanamthitta
- Climate: Tropical (Köppen)
- Website: www.pulladkumbanad.webs.com

Pullad is a town in Thiruvalla taluk in the Pathanamthitta district, Kerala, India.

Pullad is a part of Koipuram census village. It is situated 12 km east from Thiruvalla SCS Junction and 3 km from Kumbanad along the TK Road. It is part of Tiruvalla taluk.

Pullad is the part of Aranmula legislative assembly constituency and Pathanamthitta parliament constituency.

The Padinjattethil family has been associated with the development of Pullad. Members of the family donated land for infrastructure projects in the area, including government offices, schools, and places of worship. Among those associated with these activities were the family patriarch, Padinjattethil Neelakanda Panicker, and his younger brother, Vaidyan N. Narayana Panicker.

== Demographics ==
Pullad is part of Koipuram census village. Total population of Koipuram is 7319 families and 26425 inhabitants, of which 12231 are males while 14194 are females.

In Koipuram village population of children of age 0-6 is 2011, which makes up 7.61% of total population of village. Average Sex Ratio of Koipuram village is 1160, which is higher than Kerala state average of 1084. Child Sex Ratio for the Koipuram as per census is 989, higher than Kerala average of 964.

Koipuram village has higher literacy rate compared to Kerala. In 2011, literacy rate of Koipuram village was 97.31% compared to 94.00% of Kerala. In Koipuram Male literacy stands at 97.57% while female literacy rate was 97.09%.

== Points of interest ==
Pullad, known as "Asia's largest Christian gathering", the Maramon convention takes place near Pullad on the banks of Pamba river. Pullad is famous for its long and rich tradition in "Padayani".Known as "Pullad Padayani". There is also Bhagavathykavu,Padinjattethil temple, thengumthottathil and pariyarathu temple in Pullad. Pullad is also known for its tapioca farming (known as "Pulladan Kappa"). There are many family temples and Devaswom Board temples in Pullad.

== Nearby places ==
- Maramon
- Kumbanad
- Eraviperoor
- Thiruvalla
- Mallapally
- Puramattam
- Arattupuzha
- Kozhencherry

== See also ==
- Pathanamthitta
