= G. Padmanabhan Thampi =

Indian politician

G. Padmanabhan Thampi (1929-26 November 2002) was an Indian politician and leader of Communist Party of India. He represented Thiruvalla constituency in 1st Kerala Legislative Assembly.
