= Mathew T. Thomas =

Indian politician

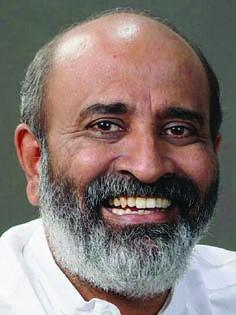
- Thomas in 2015

Minister for Water Resources, Government of Kerala
- In office 25 May 2016 – 26 November 2018
- Governor: P. Sathasivam
- Chief Minister: Pinarayi Vijayan
- Preceded by: P.J. Joseph
- Succeeded by: K. Krishnankutty

Member of Kerala Legislative Assembly
- In office 11 May 2006 – 23 May 2026
- Preceded by: Elizabeth Mammen Mathai
- Succeeded by: Varghese Mammen
- Constituency: Thiruvalla
- In office 25 March 1987 – 20 June 1991
- Preceded by: P. C. Thomas Painummoottil
- Succeeded by: Mammen Mathai
- Constituency: Thiruvalla

Minister for Transport, Government of Kerala
- In office 18 May 2006 – 16 March 2009
- Governor: R. L. Bhatia; R. S. Gavai
- Chief Minister: V. S. Achuthanandan
- Preceded by: N. Sakthan
- Succeeded by: Jose Thettayil

Personal details
- Born: 27 September 1961 (age 65) Tiruvalla, Pathanamthitta district, Kerala, India
- Party: Indian Socialist Janata Dal
- Other political affiliations: Left Democratic Front; Janata Dal Secular (Thomas) (2024–2025); Janata Dal (Secular) (1999–2024)
- Spouse: Dr. Achamma Alex
- Children: Achu Anna Mathew, Ammu Thankam Mathew

Mathew Thoompumpattu Thomas (born 27 September 1961) is an Indian politician and a member of legislative assembly, who was the former minister for water resources in Government of Kerala, State President and Legislature Party Leader of the Indian Socialist Janata Dal an ally of LDF. He was the Minister of Transport for Kerala from May 2006 to August 2009 in the LDF ministry led by V.S. Achuthanandan.

== Early life ==
Mathew Thomas was born in Thiruvalla as the son of Rev. T. Thomas, a priest of the Mar Thoma Church. He is a member of the Thoompumpattu family. He completed his B.Sc. degree from the Mar Thoma College, Tiruvalla, and also has an LL.B. from Government Law College, Thiruvananthapuram. He was motivated by the imposition of Emergency in 1977 to enter politics and joined the Kerala Vidyarthi Janata (KVJ), the state youth wing of the erstwhile Janata Party. He served in various positions, beginning as the KVJ Unit Secretary in Mar Thoma College, Tiruvalla; then as Taluk Secretary, Thiruvalla, District President, Alappuzha, State Secretary, and as State President (1985–88). He is married to Achamma Alex and has two daughters- Achu Anna Mathew and Ammu Thankam Mathew.

== Political career ==
He has been elected as a Member of the Kerala Legislature, in 1987, 2006, 2011, 2016 and 2021. In the 2021 elections, he got 62,178 votes, winning by a margin of 11421 votes, over his nearest rival, Kunju Koshy Paul of the Kerala Congress.

=== Accomplishments in office ===
As the Minister of Transport, Mathew bought the Kerala State Road Transport Corporation (KSRTC) out of great financial crisis with a series of reforms. He commissioned a study that identified areas where KSRTC could generate revenue and reduce costs. The major steps taken were transforming the bus depots into revenue generating shopping malls. As KSRTC owned the key location in every town this could generate income in the form of rent.

Another progressive step was to improve fuel efficiency and reduce accidents. This was achieved through incentivising the drivers with better economy and fewer accident rates. The corporation had submitted a proposal to the State Government for switching over to CNG as fuel. The proposal, worth Rs 280 crore, envisaged using CNG in 1,500 buses in the first phase along with another proposal for acquiring electric buses, and both the proposals would be presented before the 13th Finance Commission. The Corporation could register an annual profit of Rs 43 crore on converting to CNG and Rs 288 crore on using LNG. The KSRTC has been selected for the Kerala State Energy Conservation Awards 2009.

Mathew revived the KSRTC bus bodybuilding units and ditched the decision to buy chassis from private companies, which saved the corporation a huge amount. This scheme also helped to move more contracted employees on to a permanent basis. He reviewed the pay scales, improved working conditions and made the KSRTC more employee friendly. He hence managed to avoid the strikes which had previously caused heavy losses.

Mathew was instrumental in getting more funding for the KSRTC. Under the Jawaharlal Nehru National Urban Renewal Mission project 80 low floor air-conditioned Volvo buses were launched in Thiruvananthapuram and Kochi. Thiruvananthapuram also received another 50 air buses under the Ananthapuri Fast Buses Scheme. During his tenure, the monthly earnings of the corporation jumped Rs.68 crore to Rs.100 crore. The distance covered by the KSRTC buses increased from over 11 lakh to 13 lakh kilometers. KSRTC also created 9,135 vacancies during his term.

Mathew achieved all this with the credit of the only transport Minister to reduce the fares of KSRTC. He resigned as a result of a split in his party and sacrificed his ministership to his fellow party MLA, Jose Thettayil.
