= Vennikulam =

Vennikulam Vennikkulam
- Town
- Interactive map of Vennikulam
- Coordinates: 9.401993°N 76.667746°E
- Country: India
- State: Kerala
- District: Pathanamthitta

Government
  - Type: Panchayath
  - Body: Puramattam Grama Panchayat

Languages
  - Official: Malayalam, English
- Time zone: UTC+5:30 (IST)
- PIN: 689544
- Vehicle registration: KL - 28 (Mallappally RTO)
- Nearest city: Thiruvalla
- Taluk: Mallappally

Vennikulam is a small town situated in the bank of Manimala River Near Thiruvalla in Pathanamthitta district of Kerala, South India. Town is located midway between Pullad and Mallapally towns. It Is Part Of Thiruvalla Constituency.. It comes under Thiruvalla Revenue Division.

== Notable Persons ==
- Vennikkulam Gopala Kurup (1902 – 1980) - Malayalam poet
