= John Levy (philosopher) =

British mystic, artist, and musician

John Levy (28 April 1910 – 28 December 1976) was a British mystic, artist, and musician, best known for translating the works of his guru Sri Atmananda Krishna Menon, Atma Darshan and Atma Niviriti into English.

Born into a wealthy aristocratic family, Levy was an expert in Asian folk music, especially that of India. At one point in his life, he gave up his entire fortune and went to live in India with only a loincloth. In India, Levy was a student of V. K. Krishna Menon.

He died in London in 1976, and, following his death, his collection was bequeathed to the University of Edinburgh, where it forms the John Levy Archive.

== Publications ==
- The Nature of Man According to the Vedanta (1956), Sentient Publications, 2004, ISBN 1-59181-024-8
- Immediate Knowledge and Happiness (Sadhyomukti): The Vedantic Doctrine of Non-Duality (1970), Thorsons, London. ISBN 9780722501597
