= Abraham Mulamoottil =

Indian Catholic priest

Rev. Dr. Abraham Mulamoottil
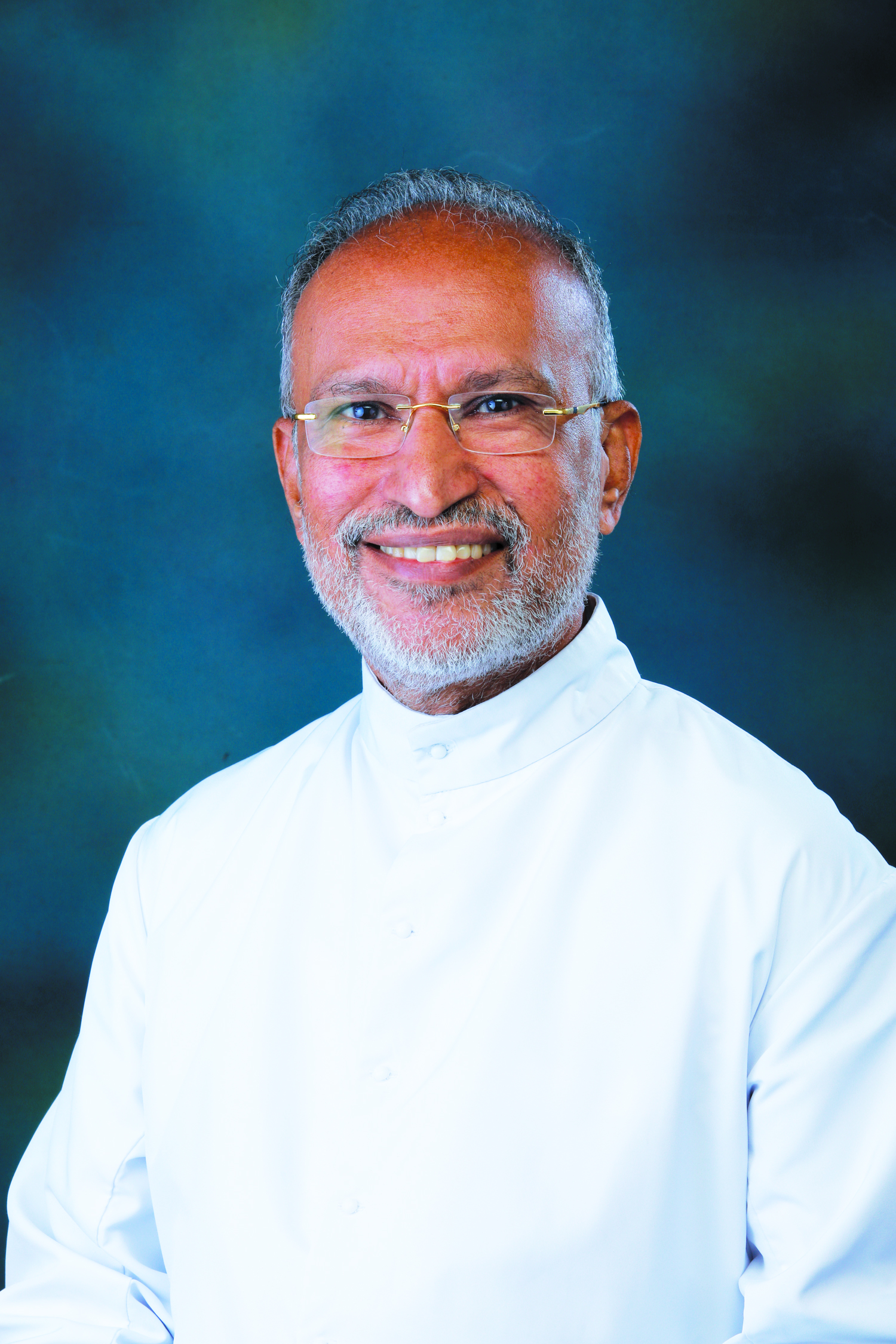
- Born: 24 November 1954 (age 71)
- Education: KU Leuven, Belgium
- Website: www.mulamoottil.in

Abraham Mulamoottil is a Catholic Priest, author, teacher, innovator, and philosopher. He earned his PhD from the Catholic University of Leuven in Belgium. He is the founder and principal of MACFAST (Mar Athanasios College for Advanced Studies, Tiruvalla). He also introduced postgraduate courses—including MSc Bioinformatics, MSc Plant Biotechnology, MSc Food Science and Technology, and MSc Phytomedical Science—for the first time in Kerala.

Mulamoottil also served as the chair and chief executive of the Pushpagiri Group of Medical Institutions in Tiruvalla. His vision played an influential role during the construction of St. John's Cathedral in Tiruvalla. He founded Kerala's first campus-based community radio, RADIO MACFAST 90.4 FM. He also pioneered the state's first and largest solar project. Additionally, he is the chief organiser of the Centre for Innovation and Development of Affordable Technologies (CIDAT), a startup platform and hub for innovation resources located in Tiruvalla, Kerala, India. As president of Central Chambers, he led an international business delegation to Expo 2020 Dubai and the ninth edition of Manama Entrepreneurship Week (MEW 2024) in Bahrain.

In recognition of his contributions as a literary writer, Abraham Mulamoottil was honoured with the UAE Golden Visa by the government of Dubai.

== Biography ==
Mulamoottil was born as the fifth of six children to Mariamma and M. V. Varughese on 24 November 1954. He attended M.G.M. High School in Thiruvalla and SB College in Changanassery before joining IMM Seminary in 1970. Recognized for his singing ability at the major seminary, he was entrusted with several key positions in the music ministry, including serving as choirmaster of the Apostolic Seminary at Vadavathoor, Kottayam, from 1973 to 1980.

In 1998, he had the opportunity to conduct the Malayalam choir during a Holy Mass at the Asian Bishops' Synod held in the Vatican, where the late Pope John Paul II served as the principal celebrant. In 1991, he departed for higher education in Belgium to pursue postgraduate studies in Brussels and later enrolled at the Catholic University of Leuven for his doctoral studies.

== Professional career ==
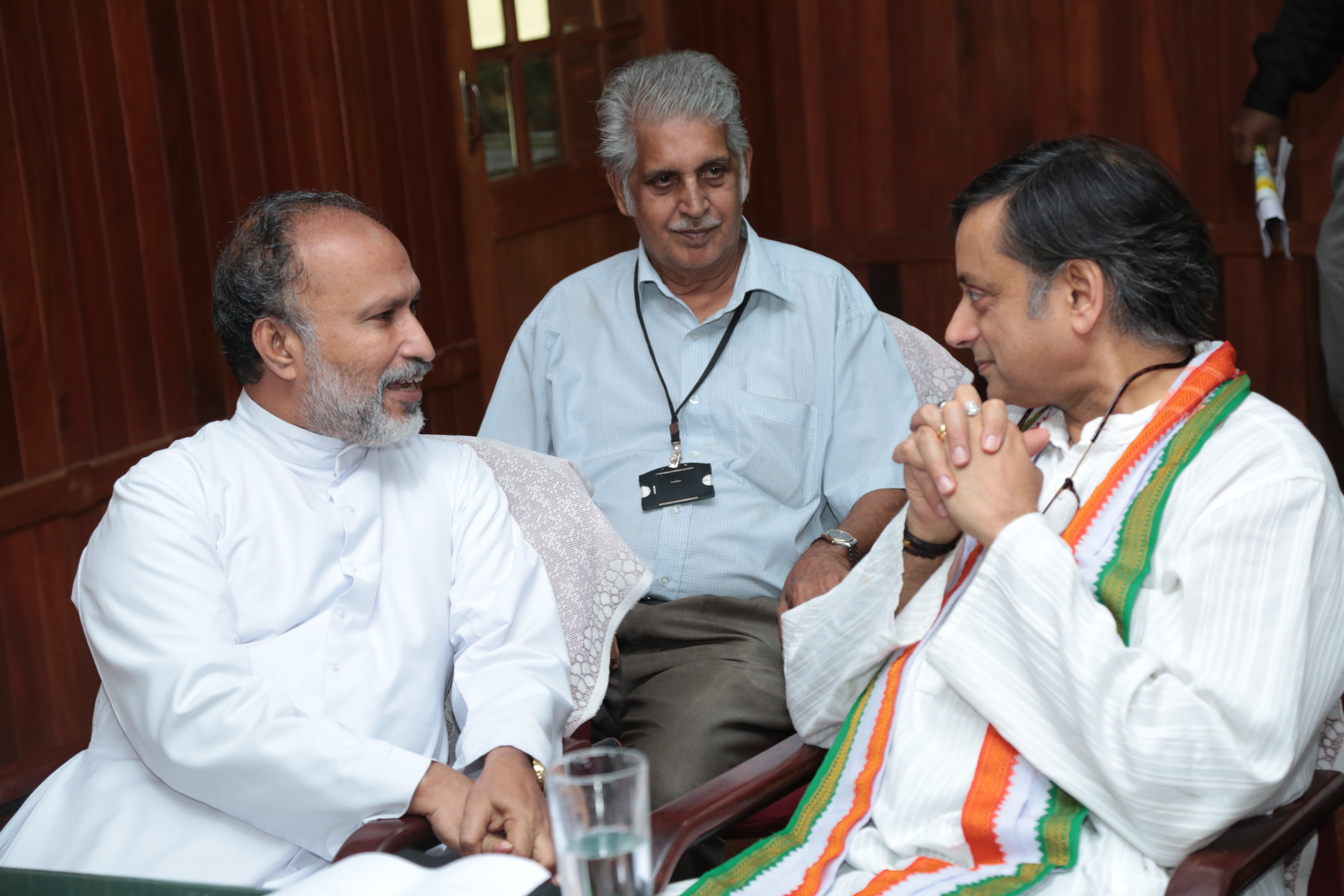
Rev. Dr. Abraham Mulamoottil with Dr. Shashi Tharoor

After obtaining his PhD from KU Leuven, Belgium, in 1998, Rev. Dr. Mulamoottil founded and became the principal of MACFAST (Mar Athanasios College for Advanced Studies, Tiruvalla) in 2001. He also introduced Kerala's first MSc courses in Bioinformatics, Plant Biotechnology, Food Science and Technology, and Phytomedical Science and Technology. In addition, he initiated the decentralized Clean and Green Project for MACFAST, extending it to the Tiruvalla Municipality. He further promoted experiential learning at MACFAST, beginning with the distribution and marketing of the film The Passion of the Christ in Kerala.

Afterwards, he became the chairman and chief executive of the Pushpagiri Group of Medical Institutions in Tiruvalla. His work led to St. John's Metropolitan Cathedral being featured by the "Incredible India" campaign in 2004. In 2009, he founded one of the first community radio projects in Kerala, RADIO MACFAST 90.4 FM. In 2011, he pioneered Kerala's first and largest solar project by installing a 30 kW solar power plant at MACFAST and a "Vellavum Velichavum" (Water and Solar) 100 kW solar electricity and reverse osmosis water plant. The facility produced 10,000 litres of water per hour at Pushpagiri, serving as a model for rural water schemes.

He has been the chairman of peacepeopleplanet.org since 2013, an agency that promotes healthcare, education, green energy, environmental protection, and research, as well as planning, designing, and coordinating corporate social responsibility activities for firms and establishments. He has also established a store for the organization that produces energy-efficient products. Additionally, he is a nominated member of the District Innovation Council of Pathanamthitta, Government of Kerala.

He is the chief organiser of the Centre for Innovation and Development of Affordable Technologies (CIDAT), a startup platform and hub for innovation resources located in Tiruvalla, Kerala, India. The centre is expanding its operations in close association with the Kerala Startup Mission, Government of Kerala, for the establishment of a Technology Business Incubator (TBI) in Tiruvalla.

Presently, he is the President of the Central Travancore Chamber of Commerce and Industry, a registered association for the promotion and development of business and industry in the Central Travancore region, which comprises four districts of Kerala, India—Kottayam, Pathanamthitta, Idukki, and Alappuzha. The Central Chambers is affiliated with the Federation of Indian Chambers of Commerce and Industry (FICCI), the Associated Chambers of Commerce and Industry of India (ASSOCHAM), and the Confederation of Indian Industry (CII).

Recently, he launched a new initiative, TALKS INDIA, driven by the belief that "human consciousness is the unique faculty of acquiring knowledge and critical thinking." The project's mission is encapsulated in the motto "Lead India Towards a Knowledge Society." Led by the Kottayam Public Library and the Mulamoottil Achen Foundation, TALKS INDIA held its inaugural session on 9 September 2024, featuring Tushar Gandhi, the great-grandson of Mahatma Gandhi, as the keynote speaker. The initiative aims to engage, inspire, and educate.

== Books ==
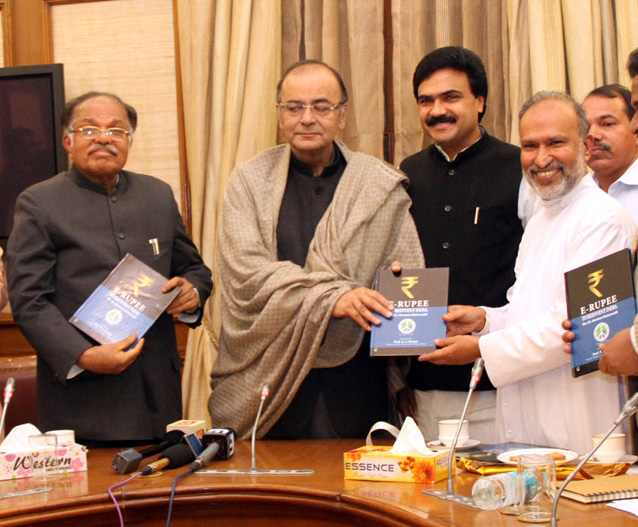
E-Rupee to Reinvent India authored by Abraham Mulamoottil released by Arun Jaitley in the presence of P. J. Kurien and Jose K. Mani at North Block New Delhi, on 19 December 2014.

- Puthiya Veenjum Puthiya Kuppiyum (2011)
- Vijnana Samooha Nirmiti (2013)
- E-Rupee to Reinvent India (2014)
- The Tent of the Pilgrim of Exile (2016)
- Keeping Religion Private – Reimagine and Reclaim (2022)
