= Manimala River =

River in India

Coordinates: 9°21′N 76°33′E

Manimala River Pullakayar, Vallapuzha, Vallabhaipuzha
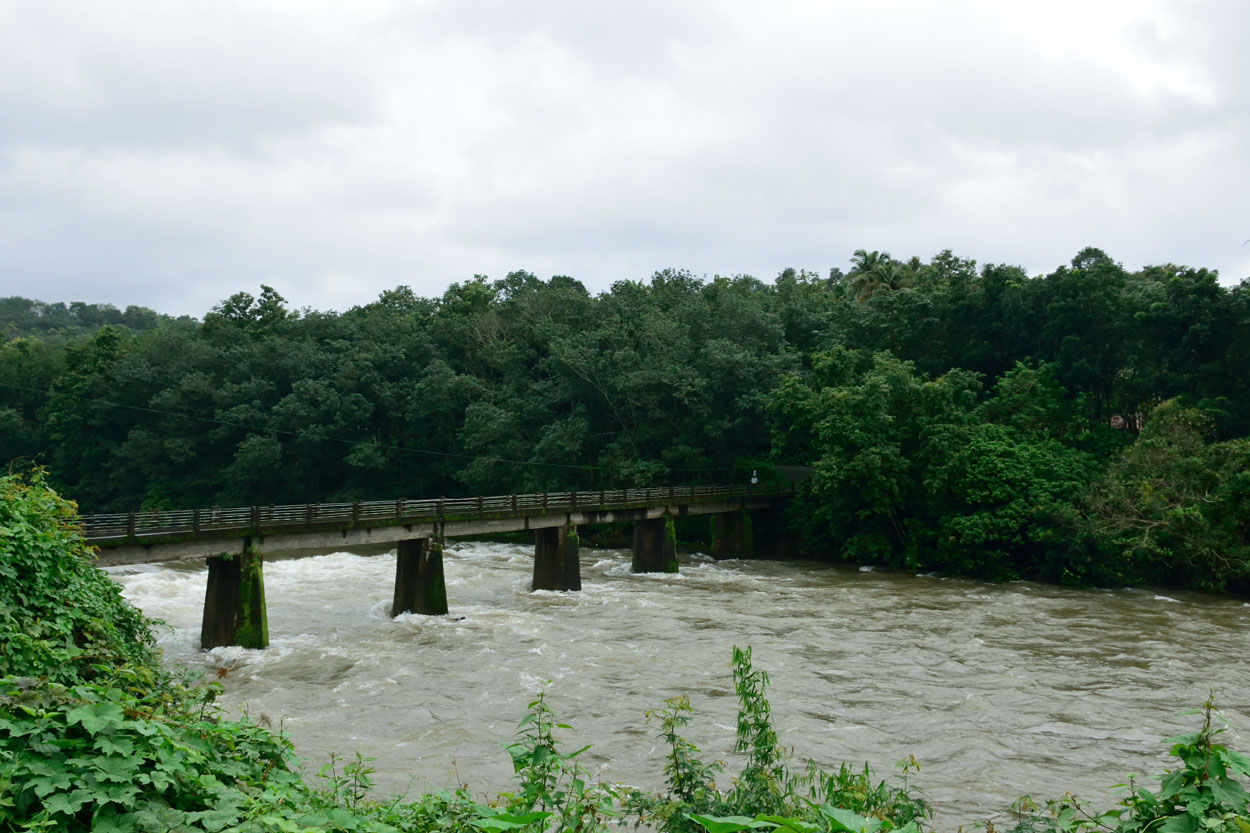
- Manimala River near Cheruvally
- Native name: മണിമലയാർ (Malayalam)

Location
- Country: India
- State: Kerala
- Districts: Kottayam, Pathanamthitta, Alappuzha
- Cities: Peermedu, Mundakayam, Erumely, Manimala, Kanjirappally, Mallappally, Vennikkulam, Kallooppara, Kaviyoor, Vallamkulam Thiruvalla, Thalavadi, Kidangara, Pulinkunnu, Edathua, Champakulam

Physical characteristics
- Source
  - location: Muthavara hills, Western Ghats
  - elevation: 2,500 ft (760 m)
- Mouth
  - location: Empties into Vembanad Lake at Kainakary through two branches which separates after Kidangara, one via Pulinkunnu, Mankompu second via Veliyanadu, Kavalam
- Length: 91.73 km (57.00 mi)
- Basin size: 802.90 km^{2} (310.00 sq mi)

Basin features
- Landmarks: Kallooppara Bhagavathy temple, Kaviyoor Mahadevar Temple, Nannoor Devi Temple

Manimala River, or Manimalayar, is a 92 km long river which flows through South Kerala. The river used to be considered a tributary of Pamba River before satellite maps became popular, but this was proved incorrect. Manimala does not flow into the Pamba; instead, a distributary of the Pamba river flows into the Manimala river at Kallunkal, later branches out again from Manimala at Nedumpuram and flows through Niranam, Thalavady, Edathua, Changankary, Champakulam, Nedumudy, Chennamkary, and finally Kainakary and then empties into the Vembanad lake. This branch again links with the Manimala River at Chennankary in a short, but broad connection known as Munnattumukham.

Manimala is a separate independent river for all geographical purposes. It has its origin on the [Muthavara Hills] (1156 metre above main sea level) on the Western Ghats in Peermedu in Idukki district of Kerala, India. It has a length of about 90 km and flows through a catchment area of about 847 km^{2}.

The river passes through the districts of Idukki, Kottayam, Pathanamthitta and Alappuzha. Yendayar, Koottickal, Mundakayam, Erumeli, Manimala, Kottangal, Kulathurmoozy, Vaipur, Mallappally, Keezhvaipur, Thuruthicad, Komalam/Kuranjoor Kadavu, Kallooppara, Vallamkulam, Kattode and Kuttoor (outskirts of Thiruvalla city), Pulikeezh, Nedumpuram, Neerattupuram, Amichakary, Muttar, Kidangara, Pulincunnoo, Veliyanadu, Ramankary, and Mankompu lie on the banks of Manimala River.

Manimala splits after Kidangara into two branches. The second branch flows via Kunnamkary, Kavalam and Kainakary to Vembanad lake. Its running length is estimated at 92 km. It empties itself into the Vembanad Lake. It is one of the four major rivers which do not have direct outlet to sea as these rivers (Meenachil, Pamba, Manimala, Achankovil) empty into the vast Vembanad lake. This huge lake has just two outlets, one at Thottappaly Spillway and second at Thannermukkom Bund, both man made barriers, built to prevent incoming seawater during high tides, which otherwise would render the low lying paddyfields (average 2.5 meters below sea level) uncultivable.

Niranam is historically known as an ancient inland port at the confluence of Manimala River and Pamba River. At Kaviyoor ancient rock-cut cave temples can still be seen.

Manimala River has been an important waterway of Central Travancore. Rising in the hills of the Kottayam-Idukki ranges, running westward, the river joins the plains at Manimala junction and then the flows through the midland plains and through the Kuttanad rice bowl area. Sand mining on the river bed has led to depletion of the waterways of the river. Pollution is a problem.

== Gallery ==
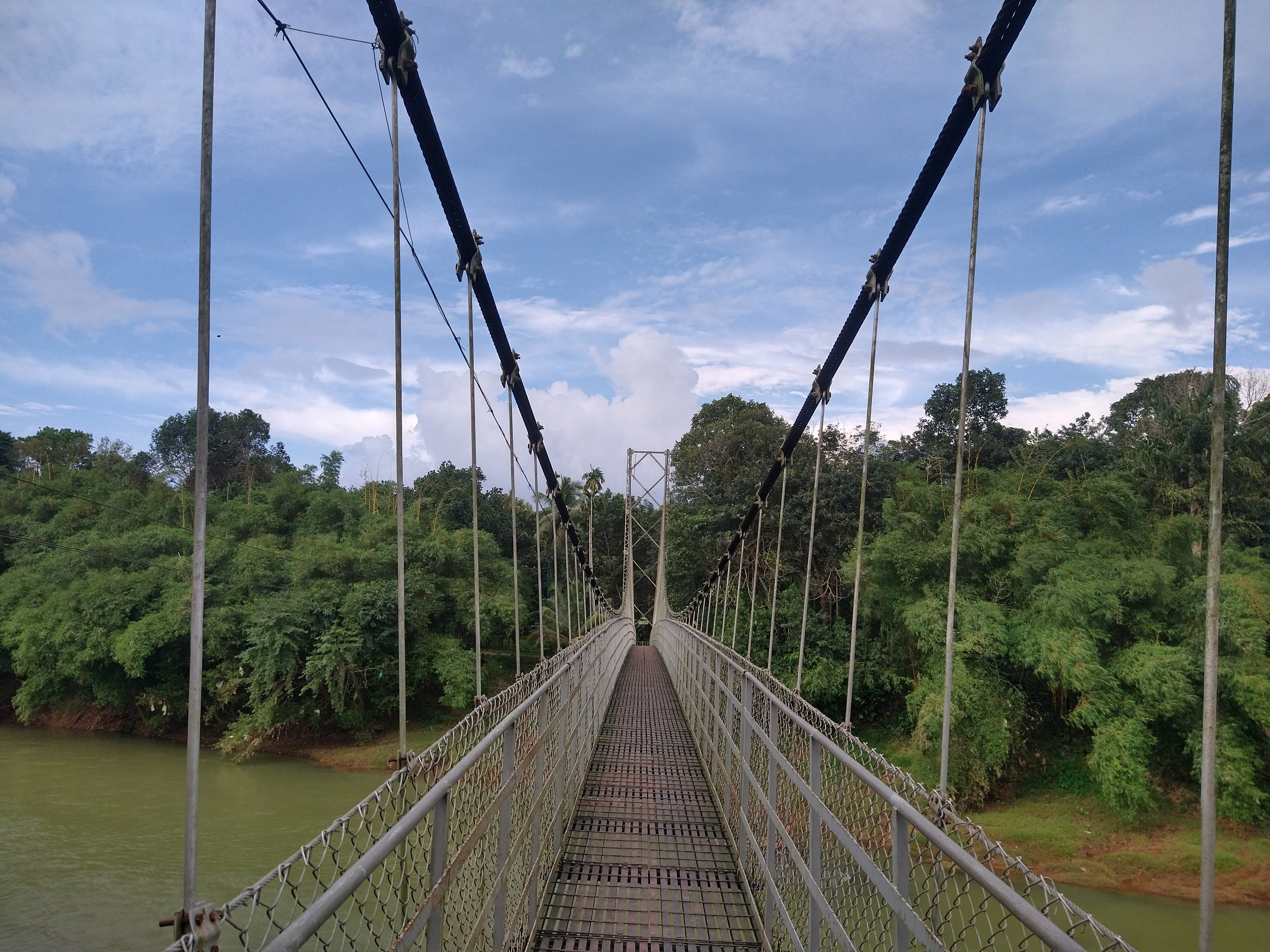
Thelappuzhakkadavu suspension bridge across Manimala River

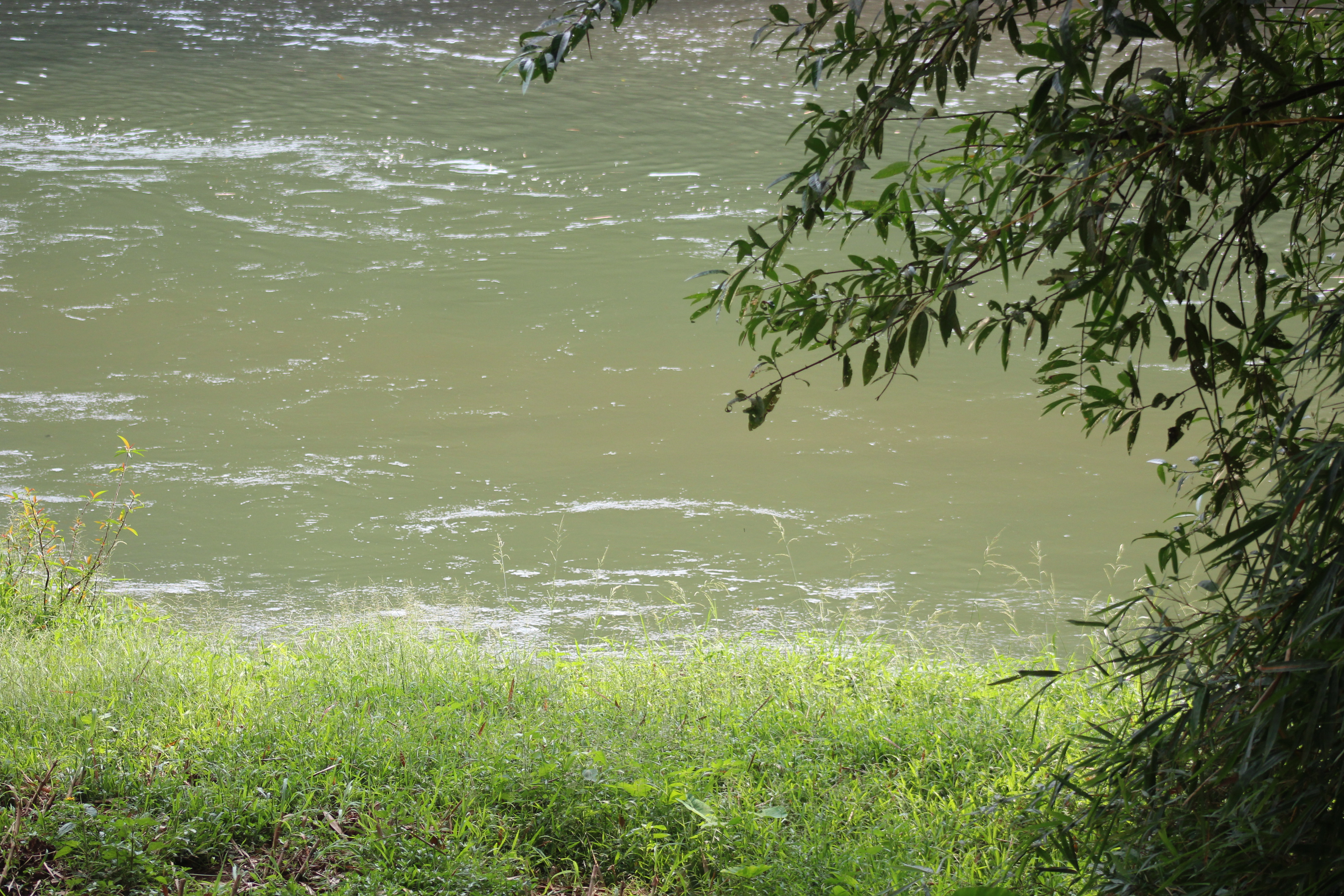
Manimala River

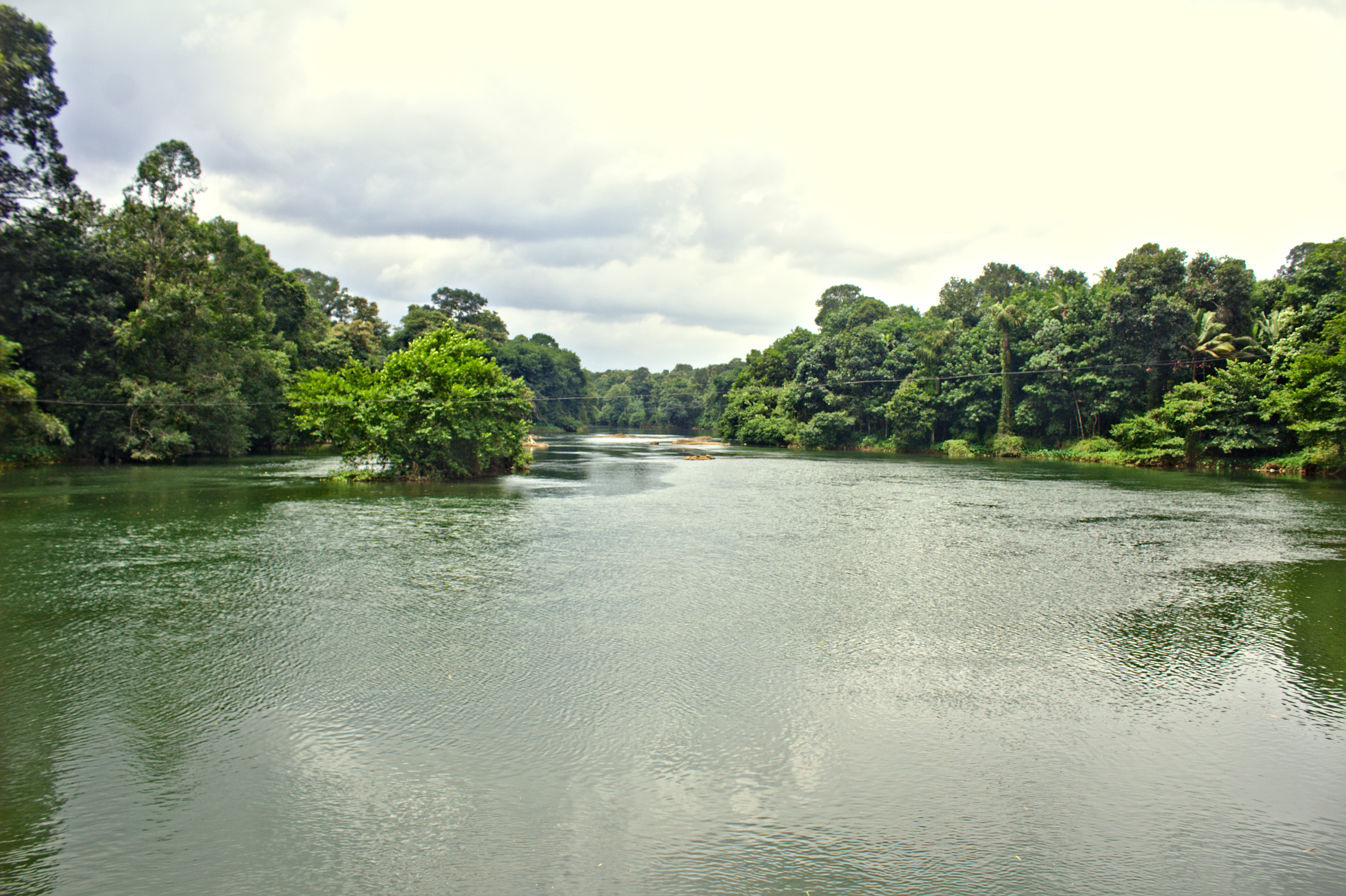
Manimala River, photographed from Pazhayidom bridge

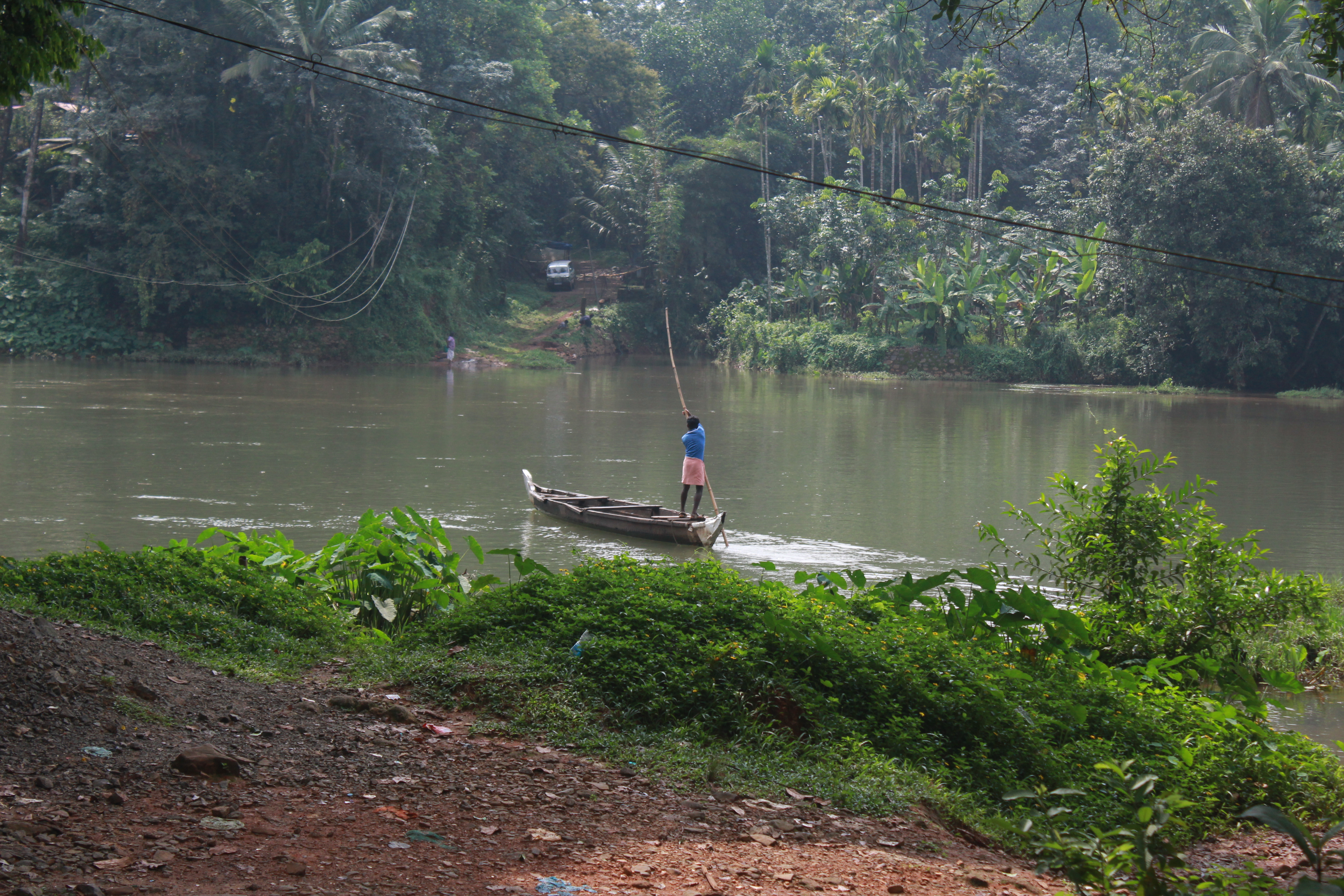
A canoe in Manimalayar

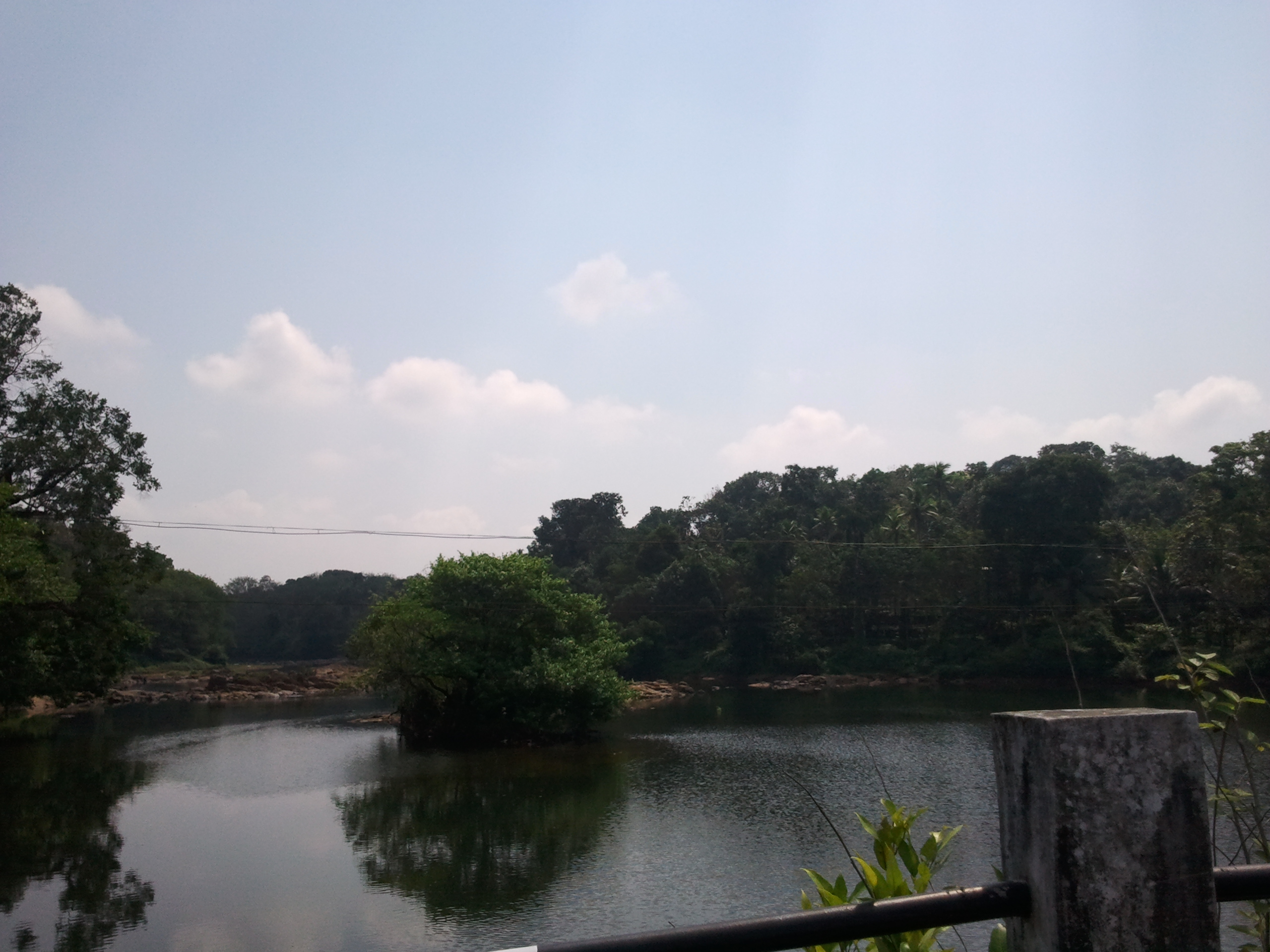
At Manimala

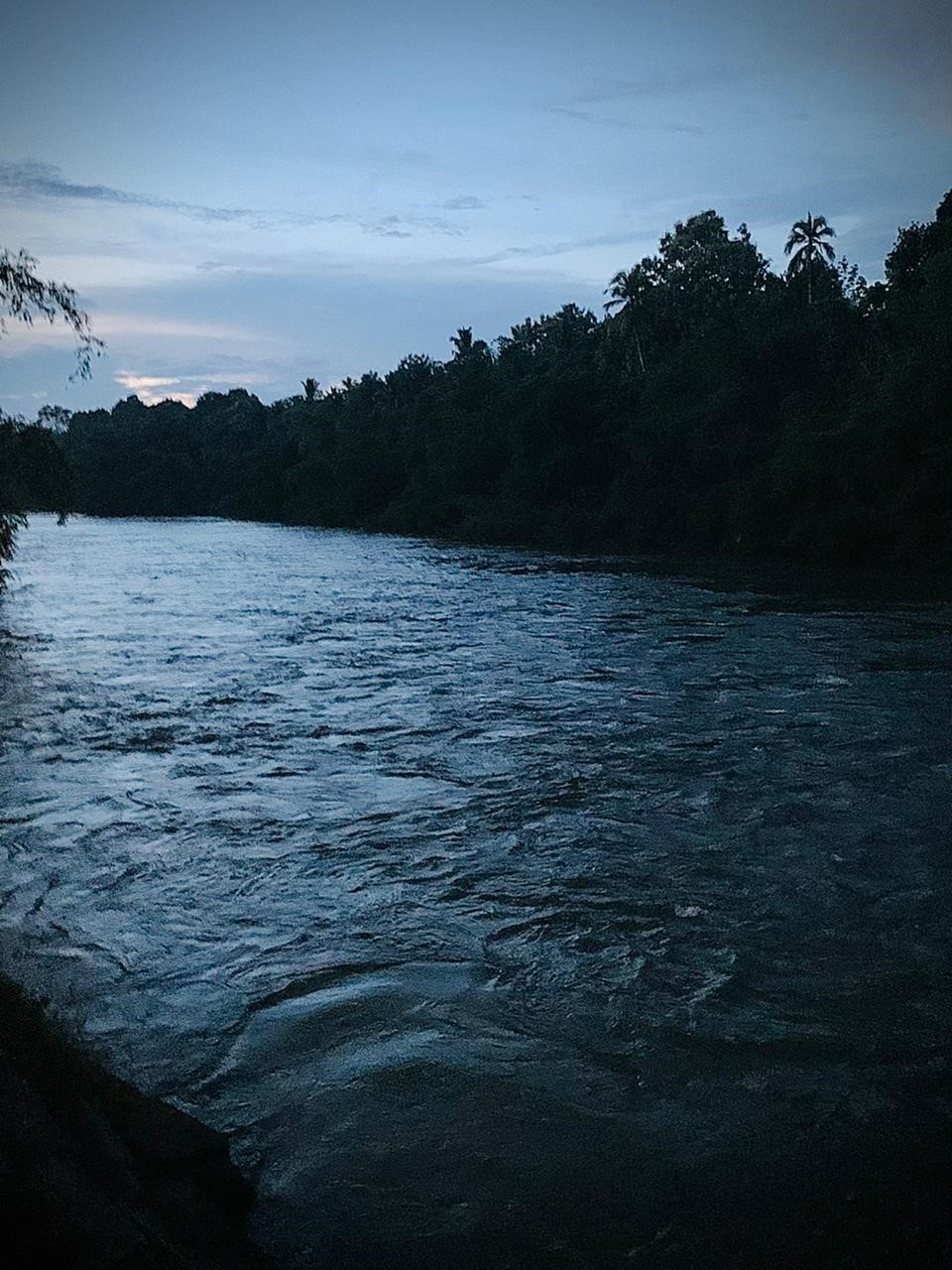
The river, photographed from Eraviperoor in Pathanamthitta District
