= Kuttoor =

- Village
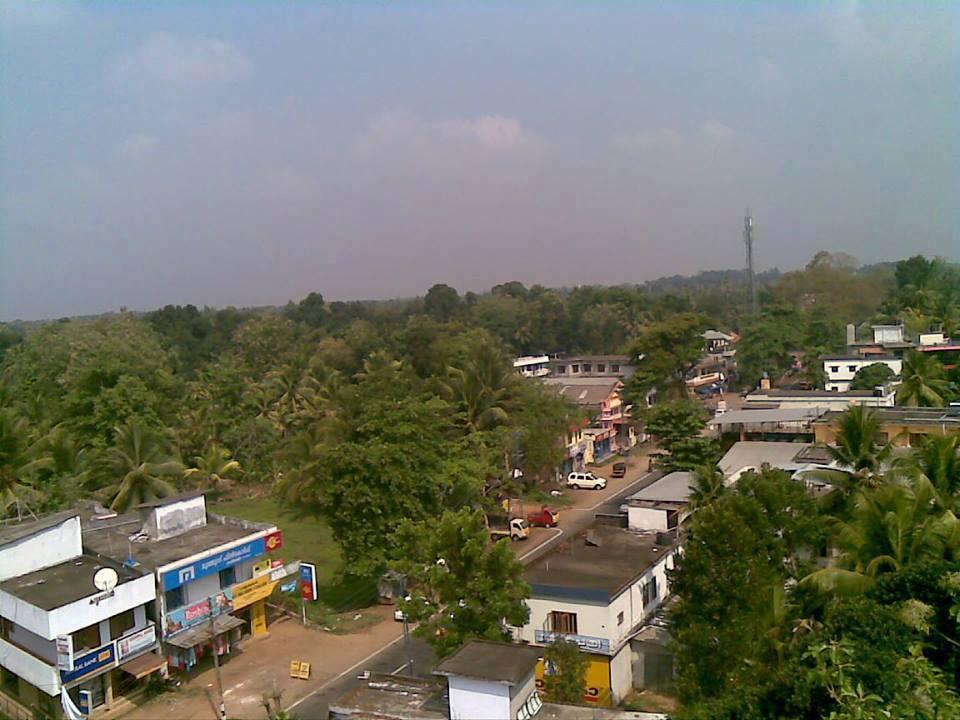

- Location in Kerala, India
- Coordinates: 9.3594°N 76.5881°E
- Country: India
- State: Kerala

Area
  - Total: 12.03 km^{2} (4.64 sq mi)

Population (2011)
  - Total: 19,652
  - Density: 1,634/km^{2} (4,231/sq mi)

Languages
  - Official: Malayalam, English
- Time zone: UTC+5:30 (IST)
- PIN: 689106
- Telephone code: 91-469
- Vehicle registration: KL-27
- Nearest city: Thiruvalla (4 km)
- Lok Sabha constituency: Pathanamthitta
- Vidhan Sabha constituency: Thiruvalla
- Nearest Airport: Cochin International Airport Limited
- Website: lsgkerala.in/Kuttoorpanchayat/

Kuttoor is a revenue village and grama panchayat in Thiruvalla taluk, Pathanamthitta district in the Indian state of Kerala.

== Location ==
This village has 12.16 square kilometer consist of 14 wards. Boundaries are Eraviperoor Panchayathu, Kadalimangalam River, Manimalayar and Varattar.Early years Kuttoor was in Kollam district and later Alappuzha District and now it under Pathanamthitta.

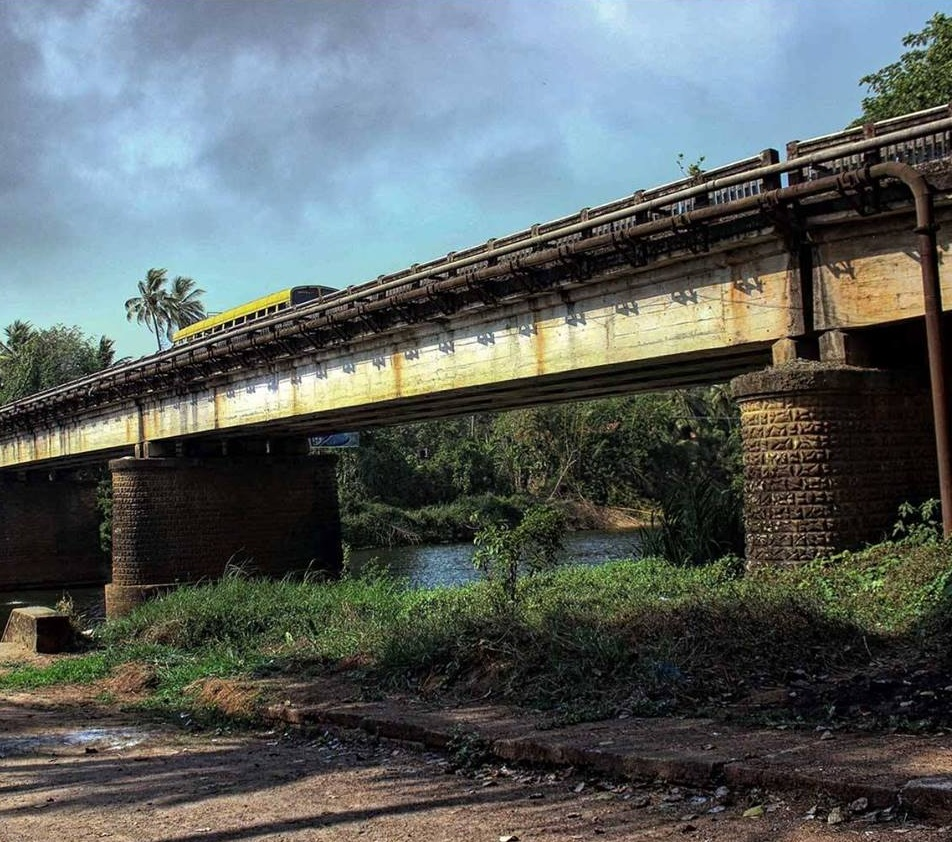
Thondra Kadavu Bridge is an entrance to Kuttoor grama panchayathu from Tiruvalla Municipality.

== Demographics ==
Total area is 1203 hectors and total population 18433 as per 2001 census.

== Transport ==
Kerala State Road Transport Corporation has a depot at Tiruvalla (station code: TVLA) which is one among the 29 major depots in the state. Its 4 km from Kuttoor. KSRTC operates long distance and interstate bus services from the Tiruvalla depot. KSRTC operates daily Interstate Airbus service to Bangalore from Tiruvalla. Tiruvalla railway station (station code: TRVL) and Chenagannur (station code: CGNR) railway station are near to Kuttoor. Thiruvalla railway station is the sole railway station in Pathanamthitta district. Both stations are only 4 km from Kuttoor. Most trains stop here. Another major railway station is Kottayam railway station which is 25 km from Kuttoor. The nearest airports are Cochin International Airport (105 km) and Trivandrum airport (126 km).

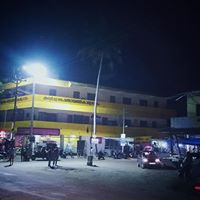
Kuttoor Panchayath Office

== Politics ==
The current Panchayathu is under governed by NDA. Out of 15 wards, 6 seat won by NDA, UDF 5, LDF 4.

Current MLA is Adv. Varghese Mammen of Kerala Congress. Current MP Pathanamthitta (Lok Sabha constituency) is Anto Antony

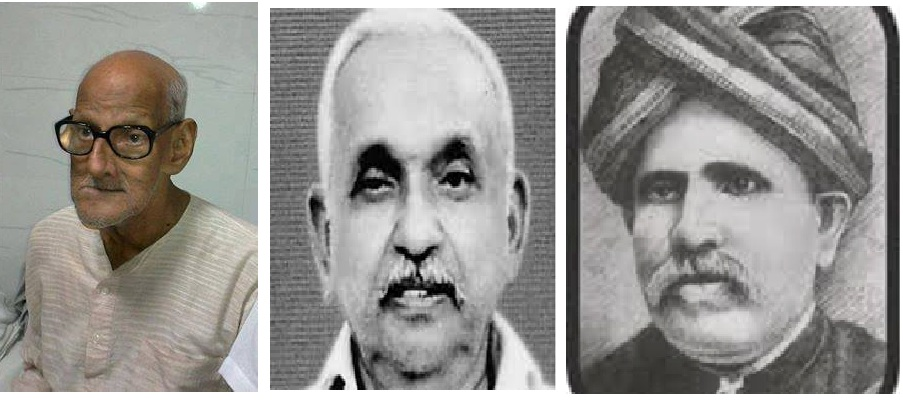
K E Mamman, Venpala Ramachandran, Kandathil, Varghese Mapillai

== Temples ==
- Vanchimoottil Devi Temple, Thalayar
- Sankara Narayana Darma Sastra Kshetram, Kuttoor
- Sree Kailasa Nadha Uma Maheswara Kshetram, Thengeli
- Puthoorkavu Kshetram, Kuttoor
- Valliyilkavu devi Kshetram, Thengeli
- Dritharashramala Kshetram, Pottanmala
- Kadalimangalam devi temple, Venpala

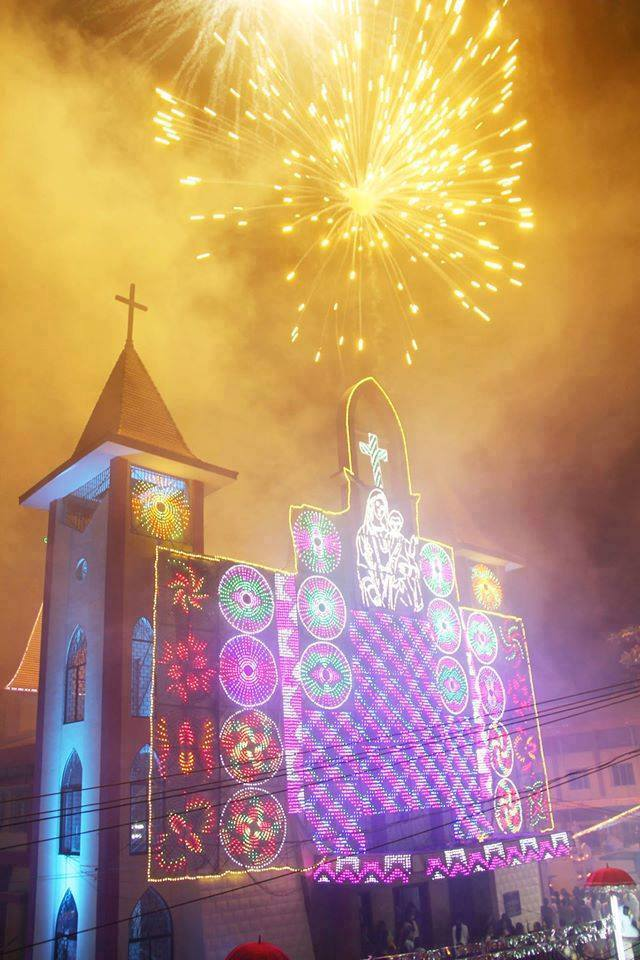
St'Mary's Knanaya Church, Kuttoor.

== Churches ==
- St'Mary'Orthodox Syrian Church, Venpala
- St'Mary's Knanaya Church, Thengali
- St'George Orthodox Church Thengali
- St'Mary's Knanaya Catholic Church Thengali
- St'Mary's Knanaya Church Kuttoor
- St'George Orthodox Church, Kallumkal Venpala
- New India Church of God, Thengali
- New India Church of God, Kuttoor
- Bretheran Assembly Hall, Kuttoor
- All Saint's CSI Church, Kuttoor
- Salem Marthoma Church Thymaravumkara

== Hospitals ==
- Pushpagiri Medical College Hospital 3.1 km
- Dr. K.M Cherian Institute of Medical Sciences, Kallissery 4.1 km
- Taluk Headquarters Hospital (Govt.Hospital, Thiruvalla) 4.3 km
- Tiruvalla Medical Mission Hospital 4.8 km
- Believers Church Medical College Hospital 7.0 km
- St.Gregorious Medical Mission Multi-Speciality Hospital, Parumala (Parumala Hospital) 12.0 km
