= Vennikkulam Gopala Kurup =

Indian poet and playwright (1902–1980)

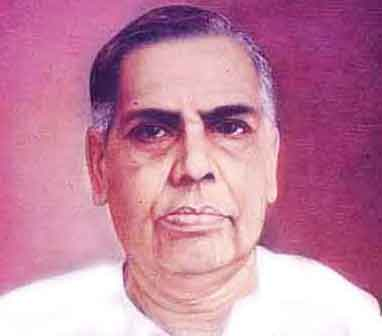
- Born: May 10, 1902; Vennikulam, Quilon, Travancore (present-day Vennikulam, Pathanamthitta district, Kerala, India)
- Died: August 29, 1980 (aged 78); Pathanamthitta, Kerala
- Occupations: Poet; playwright; translator; lexicographer
- Spouse: Madhavi Pillai
- Children: Sahity Kurup, Smrita Kurup
- Parent(s): Padmanabha Kurup, Lakshmy Kunjamma
- Awards: 1966 Kerala Sahitya Akademi Award for Poetry; 1969 Odakkuzhal Award; 1974 Sahitya Akademi Award; Thirukural Award

Vennikkulam Gopala Kurup (1902–1980) was an Indian poet, playwright, translator, lexicographer and story writer of Malayalam. He was the author of a number of poetry anthologies, besides other works, and he translated Abhijnana Shakuntalam, Tulsi Ramayana, Tirukkuṛaḷ, the poems of Subramania Bharati and two cantos of The Light of Asia of Edwin Arnold into Malayalam. He also contributed in the preparation of a dictionary, Kairali Kosham. A recipient of the Odakkuzhal Award and Thirukural Award, Kurup received the Kerala Sahitya Akademi Award for Poetry in 1966. Sahitya Akademi honoured him with their annual award in 1974.

== Biography ==
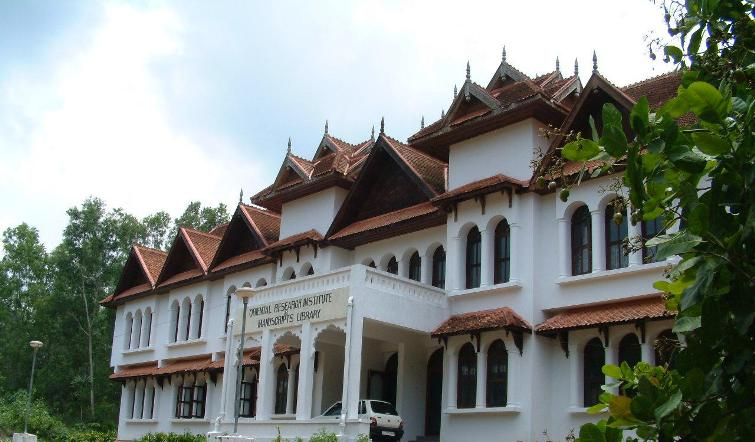
The Oriental Research Institute & Manuscripts Library

Gopala Kurup was born on May 10, 1902, at Vennikulam, Quilon, Travancore (present-day Pathanamthitta district, Kerala) to Cherukattumadathil Padmanabha Kurup and Lakshmi Kunjamma. After learning the basics of Sanskrit from his father, he completed his primary education under Kochu Pillai, a local teacher, and joined the local school at Vennikulam, where he had the opportunity to learn under Kaviyoor Vekitachalam Iyer and A. Sahasranama Iyer to pass the 7th standard. Subsequently, he started his career as a teacher in 1917, but continued his studies to pass the vidwan examination after which he joined the English school vennikulam started by Kandathil Varghese Mappillai in 1918. Later, he shifted to Tiruvalla to join M.G.M. High School in 1924 where he stayed for 25 years until joining the Malayalam Lerxicon and State Manuscripts Library, the present-day Oriental Research Institute & Manuscripts Library, as a librarian. During his stint at Tiruvalla, he was also associated with Malayala Manorama, assisting in selecting poems for publishing in the weekly, an assignment he got when K. C. Mammen Mappillai became fascinated with one of the speeches Kurup made at Orthodox Theological Seminary, Kottayam in 1926. He superannuated from official service in 1961.

Gopala Kurup was married to Mepral Mangattuveettil Madhavi Pillai, the marriage taking place in 1932. He died on August 29, 1980, at the age of 78.

His tomb is at Vennikulam Manimala River Shore.

== Legacy ==
Kurup's oeuvre comprises 19 poetry anthologies, two plays viz. Kalidasante Kanmani and Priyamvada, one book of folk tales, Thacholi Othenan, and a book of children's literature titled Katha Nakshathrangal. Known to have been influenced by Vallathol Narayana Menon, his poems are noted for their spiritual undertone. While working at the manuscripts library, he was involved in the preparation of Kairali Kosham. Besides, he translated Abhijnana Shakuntalam, Tulsi Ramayana, Tirukkuṛaḷ, the poems of Subramania Bharati under the title, Bharatiyude Kavithakal. and two cantos of The Light of Asia of Edwin Arnold into Malayalam. He also published his autobiography under the title, Athmarekha.

== Awards and honours ==
The Kerala Sahitya Akademi selected Kurup's poetry anthology, Manikyaveena, for their annual award for poetry in 1966. Three years later, his translation, Tulasidaasaramayanam, fetched him the 1969 Odakkuzhal Award. Sahitya Akademi, the National academy of letters, honoured him with their annual award in 1974, work Kamasurabhi earning him the honours. He was awarded the titles Sahithya Nipunan by the Maharaja of Kochi and 'Sahithyakalanidhi' by the Kerala chapter of the Dakshina Bharat Hindi Prachar Sabha. Kurup, who represented Kerala at the national poets' meetings held at Delhi, Calcutta and Bangalore, was also a recipient of the Thirukkural Award and the honoris causa degree of the Doctor of Letters from the Kanpur University.

== Bibliography ==
=== Poetry ===
- Gopala Kurup, Vennikkulam (1982). Theertthadhāra: kavitāsamāhāraṃ (in Malayalam). Kōṭṭayaṃ: DC Books. OCLC 16970737.
- Gopala Kurup, Vennikkulam (1965). Manikyaveena (in Malayalam). Kōṭṭayaṃ: Sāhityapr̲avarttaka Sahakaraṇasaṃghaṃ. OCLC 1049061043.
- Gopala Kurup, Vennikkulam (1962). Kadaleevanam. Kōṭṭayaṃ: Sāhityapr̲avarttaka Sahakaraṇasaṅghaṃ. OCLC 39769745.
- Gopala Kurup, Vennikkulam (1971). Kāmasurabhi (in Malayalam). OCLC 978022579.
- Vennikkulam Gopala Kurup (1968). Ponnampalamedu.
- Gopala Kurup, Vennikkulam (1962). Sidharthacharitham (in Malayalam). Kōnni: Venus Pr̲ess & Book Depot. OCLC 20559919.
- Rajaraja Varma Raja, Vadakkumkoor; Hari Sarma, A. D; Gopala Kurup, Vennikkulam; Kunjikuttan Thampuran (1966). Śr̲imahābhārataṃ (in Malayalam). Kōṭṭayaṃ: Sāhityapr̲avarttaka Sahakaraṇasaṅghaṃ. OCLC 20784636.
- Gopala Kurup, Vennikkulam. Kama Surabhi: Kavithakal (in Malayalam).
- Gopala Kurup, Vennikkulam. Vasantholsavam (in Malayalam).
- Gopala Kurup, Vennikkulam. Manivilakku: Kadha Kavyam (in Malayalam).
- Gopala Kurup, Vennikkulam (1978). Swarna Sandhya: Kavithakal (in Malayalam).
- Gopala Kurup, Vennikkulam (1988). Saundarya pooja. Kottayam, SPCS.
- Gopala Kurup, Vennikkulam (1953). Vellithalam: Kavithakal (in Malayalam).
- Gopala Kurup, Vennikkulam. Aaramme Gandhi: Kavithakal (in Malayalam). DC Books. Archived from the original on 21 December 2021.
- Sarovaram
- Manasaputhri
- Amruthabhishekam
- Keralasree

=== Translations ===
- Gopala Kurup, Vennikkulam; Translator; Thulasidas; Author (2008). Ramacharithamaanasam: Thulasidasa Ramayanam.
- Gopala Kurup, Vennikkulam; Translator; Subrahmanya Bharati; Author (1962). Bharathiyute kavithakal. Sahitya Pravarthaka Co-operative Society.
- Thirukkural

=== Autobiography ===
- Gopala Kurup, Vennikkulam (1974). Ātmarēkha (āthmakatha) (in Malayalam). OCLC 978080213.

== See also ==
- List of Malayalam-language authors by category
- List of Malayalam-language authors
