= Varghese Mammen =

Indian politician and lawyer

Adv. Varghese Mammen

Member of the Kerala Legislative Assembly
- Incumbent
- Assumed office 4 May 2026
- Preceded by: Mathew T. Thomas
- Constituency: Thiruvalla

Personal details
- Born: 1967 (age 58–59) Thiruvalla, Pathanamthitta, Kerala, India
- Party: Kerala Congress
- Spouse: Vainy Varghese Mammen
- Children: 2
- Education: Kerala Law Academy Law College
- Occupation: Lawyer, Politician

Adv. Varghese Mammen (born c. 1967) is an Indian politician and legal professional who serves as the Member of the Legislative Assembly (MLA) for the Thiruvalla constituency in Pathanamthitta district. A member of the Kerala Congress, he represents the United Democratic Front (UDF) alliance.

== Early life and education ==
Varghese Mammen was born in Thiruvalla to the late Rev. P. D. Mammen. He earned his LL.B. from the Kerala Law Academy Law College, Thiruvananthapuram, in 1991. Prior to his legislative career, he practiced as an advocate and a Notary Public in the Thiruvalla region.

== Political career ==
In the 2026 Kerala Legislative Assembly election, Mammen was nominated as the UDF candidate for the Thiruvalla seat. He won the election with 53,224 votes, representing a 37.82% vote share.

He defeated his nearest rival, Anoop Antony of the Bharatiya Janata Party (NDA), who received 43,078 votes, by a margin of 10,146 votes. The victory marked a shift in the constituency, which was previously held by the LDF.

=== Election results (2026) ===
Party	Candidate	Votes	%
KEC (UDF)	Varghese Mammen	53,224	37.82
BJP (NDA)	Anoop Antony	43,078	30.61
ISJD (LDF)	Mathew T. Thomas	42,023	29.86
Margin of victory		10,146	7.21

Currently, Mammen is holding the positions in the Kerala Legislative Assembly:-

1. Chairman, Library Advisory Committee, Kerala Legislative Assembly.
2. Member, Subject Committee XIV (Home), Kerala Legislative Assembly.
3. Member, House Committee, Kerala Legislative Assembly.
4. Member, Enviornment Committee, Kerala Legislative Assembly.

== Personal life ==
Mammen is married to Vainy Varghese Mammen, a teacher. They have two sons, Mammen Varghese Punchamannil and Ninan Vergis Punchamannil
