= Mammen Mathai =

Indian politician

MLA of Kerala Assembly for Thiruvalla
- Constituency: Thiruvalla

Personal details
- Born: 5 September 1951
- Died: 23 September 2003 (aged 52)
- Party: Kerala Congress (M)
- Spouse: Smt. Elizabeth Mammen Mathai

Mammen Mathai was a member of the 9th, 10th, and 11th Kerala Legislative Assembly. He was from Kerala Congress (M) party and represented the Thiruvalla constituency.

== Positions held ==
- Chairman, Committee of petitions, Kerala Legislative Assembly (2001–03)
- Senate member CUSAT
- President, Peringara Grama Panchayat
