= Kumbanad =

- Town
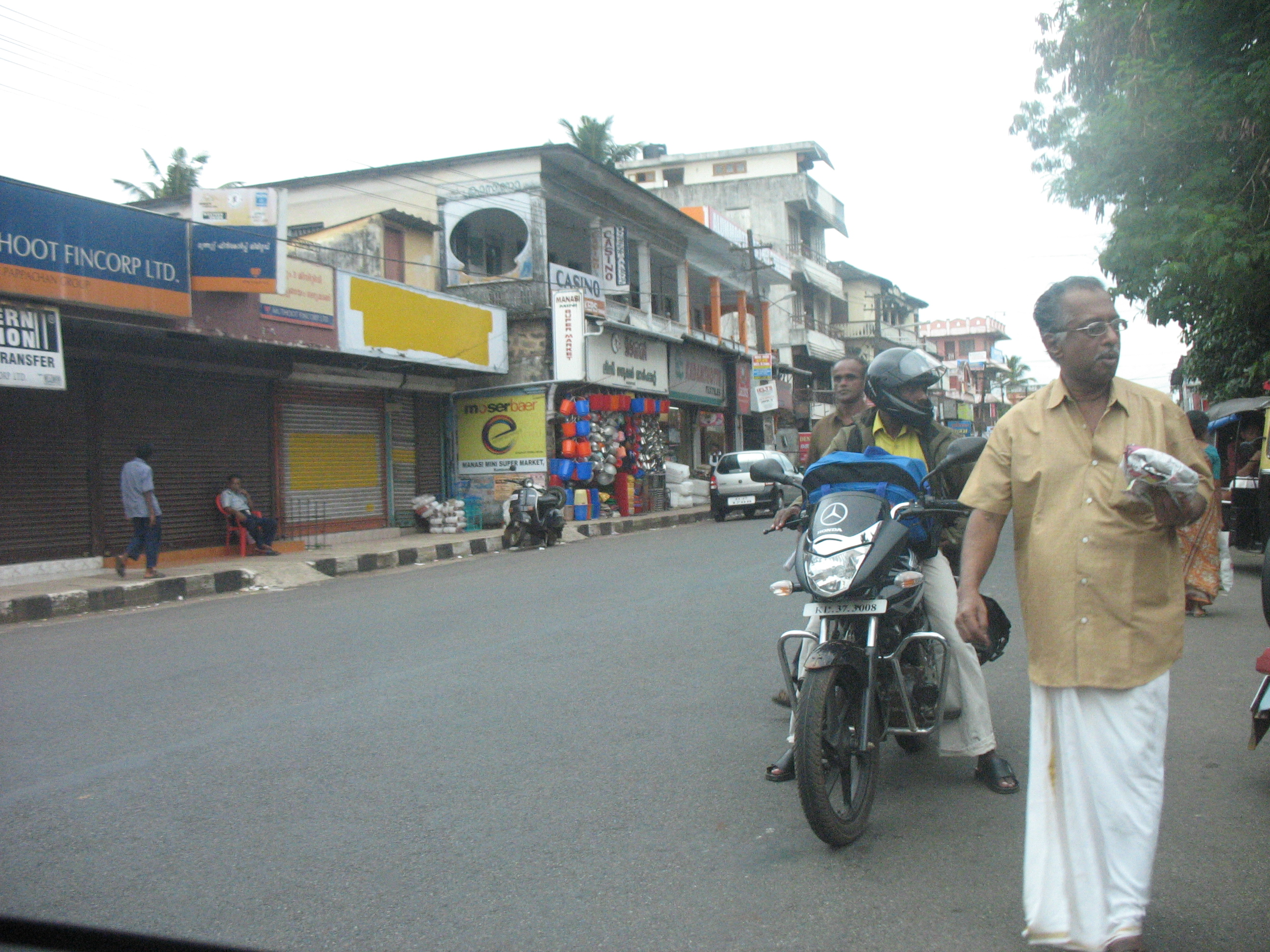
- Kumbanad Junction

- Location in Kerala, India Kumbanad (India)
- Coordinates: 9.352°N 76.661°E
- Country: India
- State: Kerala
- District: Pathanamthitta
- Taluk: Tiruvalla
- Time zone: UTC+5:30 (IST)
- PIN: 689547
- Telephone code: 469
- Vehicle registration: KL-27 THIRUVALLA
- Nearest city: Tiruvalla
- Lok Sabha constituency: Pathanamthitta
- Climate: Tropical (Köppen)

Kumbanad is a small Town in Thiruvalla Sub-District. It is part of Thiruvalla Taluk & Thiruvalla Revenue Division of Pathanamthitta district in the State of Kerala. It is an important town situated on T.K. Road, equidistant from Eraviperoor and Pullad; which are at a distance of 3 km.

== Economy ==
Remittance from NRIs is the primary source of income. The large number of ATMs and high density of banks are also attributed to large bank deposits. As of 2009, the bank deposits for the Kumbanad-Thiruvalla belt are estimated to be ₹ 5,400 Crore.

There are other small business and services that depend on the foreign remittance. Since most of the emigrants are young and middle aged, most of the settled population is old-aged. There are services and health care units that cater to their needs.

In 2023, the BBC reported on the problems and benefits which have arisen from migration away from Kerala, focussing on the village of Kumbanad.

== Politics ==
Kumbanad is part of the Pathanamthitta District. In Lok Sabha, Kumbanad is represented by the sitting MP from Pathanamthitta, Mr. Anto Antony (Indian National Congress). Aranmula assembly segment and Adv Abin Varkey is the current MLA (2026 Kerala Legislative Assembly elections). Varghese Eapen (United Democratic Front) is the current Koipuram Panchayat President.

== See also ==
- Pullad
- Tiruvalla
- Koipuram
- Kozhencherry
- Indian Pentecostal Church of God
