= Jean Klein (spiritual teacher) =

French spiritual teacher

- Born: October 19, 1912; Berlin, Germany
- Died: February 22, 1998 (aged 85); Santa Barbara, California
- Occupations: author, spiritual teacher, philosopher
- Writing career
- Subjects: Advaita Vedanta, nonduality, philosophy, metaphysics

Jean Klein (October 19, 1912 – February 22, 1998) was a French author, spiritual teacher and philosopher of Nondualism and Neo-Advaita. According to Jean Klein, it is only in a "spontaneous state of interior silence that we can open ourselves to our true nature: the 'I Am' of pure consciousness."

== Biography ==
Jean Klein was born to a Jewish family in Berlin and spent his childhood in Brno and Prague. He studied musicology and medicine in Vienna and Berlin, becoming a physician. Having left Germany in 1933 for France, he secretly worked with the French Resistance in the Second World War. After the war, Klein again left for India to study Yoga and Advaita Vedanta for three years. During those three years he met a spiritual teacher of Advaita, Pandit Veeraraghavachar Rao, a scholar at the Sanskrit College in Bangalore, and returned to the West to become a spiritual teacher himself. He died in 1998 in Santa Barbara, California.

== Books ==
- Be Who You Are, 1978, ISBN 0-7224-0167-1; 2006, ISBN 0-9551762-5-5
- The Ease of Being, 1986, ISBN 0-89386-015-8
- Who Am I? The Sacred Quest, 1988, ISBN 1-85230-029-9; 2006, ISBN 0-9551762-6-3
- I Am, 1989, ISBN 1-877769-19-3; 2006, ISBN 0-9551762-7-1
- Transmission of the Flame, 1990, ISBN 1-877769-22-3; ISBN 1-877769-20-7
- Open to the Unknown: Dialogues in Delphi, 1993, ISBN 1-877769-18-5
- Beyond Knowledge, 1994, ISBN 1-877769-23-1; 2006, 0-9551762-8-X
- Living Truth: Where Time and Timelessness Meet, 1995, ISBN 1-877769-24-X; 2007, ISBN 0-9553999-1-2
- The Book of Listening, 2008, ISBN 0-9553999-4-7
