= Peringara =

- Village
- Interactive map of Peringara
- Country: India
- State: Kerala
- District: Pathanamthitta

Population (2011)
  - Total: 14,440

Languages
  - Official: Malayalam, English
- Time zone: UTC+5:30 (IST)
- PIN: 689108
- Vehicle registration: KL-27
- Nearest city: Thiruvalla
- Lok Sabha constituency: Pathanamthitta
- Vidhan Sabha constituency: Thiruvalla

Peringara is a village and in the Peringara gram panchayat in Thiruvalla Taluk Of Pathanamthitta district, Kerala. Peringara is located 3.9 km from Thiruvalla Town Centre. The gram panchayat includes the wards of Mepral, Idinjillam, Perumthuruthy, and Chathenkary.

The revenue village covers wards 1, 2, 3, 8, 9, 10, 11, 12, 13, 14, and 15 of the gram panchayat.

== Geography ==
Peringara is part of the Upper Kuttanad geographical region. It has an average elevation of 19 m. The area is located along the border with Alappuzha district and Kottayam district. Low-lying paddy fields typical of Kuttanad cover most of the area, making it prone to flooding during the monsoons. The area lies between the Pamba and Manimala rivers, the latter of which flows through the panchayat.The southeastern part (Peringara proper), and northern part (Perumthuruthy and Idinjillam) form a part of the built-up area of Thiruvalla.

== Demographics ==
As per the 2011 Indian census, Peringara has a total population of 14,440, a 4.3% decline from the 15,089 registered in 2001. Of this, 46.1% is male and 53.9% is female. 8.25% of the population is under 6 years of age. Scheduled Castes and Scheduled Tribes constitute 6.79% and 0.2% of the population respectively. The total literacy rate was 97.29% (97.93% for males and 96.75% for females), which is higher than the state average of 94% and the national average of 74.04%.

== Administration ==
The Peringara gram panchayat covers an area of approximately 18.2 sq mi. It is divided into 15 wards:

1. Mepral West
2. Mepral
3. Mepral East
4. Alumthuruthy
5. Idinjillam
6. Perumthuruthy
7. Chalakkuzhy
8. Kuzhivelipuram
9. Karackal
10. Peringara East
11. Peringara
12. Karackal South
13. Peringara West
14. Chathenkary
15. Chathenkary North

== Religious places ==
- Yammarkulangara Sree Mahaganapathi Temple
- Koottummel Bhagavathi Temple
- Puthukkulangaraara Temple
- India Pentecostal Church of God
- The Pentecostal Mission
- Karakkal Palli - St. George Orthodox Church, Karakkal
- Malankara Catholic Church Peringara, Karakkal
- Church of God (Full Gospel) In India, Mepral
