= Koipuram =

- Census village
- Location in Kerala, India Koipuram (India)
- Coordinates: 9°20′40″N 76°39′05″E
- Country: India
- State: Kerala
- District: Pathanamthitta
- Taluk: Tiruvalla

Population (2011)
  - Total: 26,425

Languages
  - Official: Malayalam, English
- Time zone: UTC+5:30 (IST)
- PIN: 6XXXXX
- Vehicle registration: KL-27
- Website: http://rto.inmap.in/Thiruvalla/Kerala

Koipuram is a large census village in Tiruvalla, Pathanamthitta district in the state of Kerala, India. Kumbanad, Muttumon, Pullad, Poovathoor, are the nodal points.

== Demographics ==
Koipuram is a large census village located in Tiruvalla, with 7319 families residing. The population of Koipuram area is 26425, of which 12231 are males while 14194 are females as per the Population Census of 2011. Average Sex Ratio of Koipuram village is 1160 which is higher than the Kerala state average of 1084. Child Sex Ratio for the Koipuram as per census is 989, higher than the Kerala average of 964. Koipuram village has higher literacy rate compared to Kerala. In 2011, the literacy rate of Koipuram village was 97.31% compared to 94.00% of Kerala. In Koipuram male literacy was at 97.57% while female literacy rate was 97.09%.
