= Mallapally =

Mallappally
- village
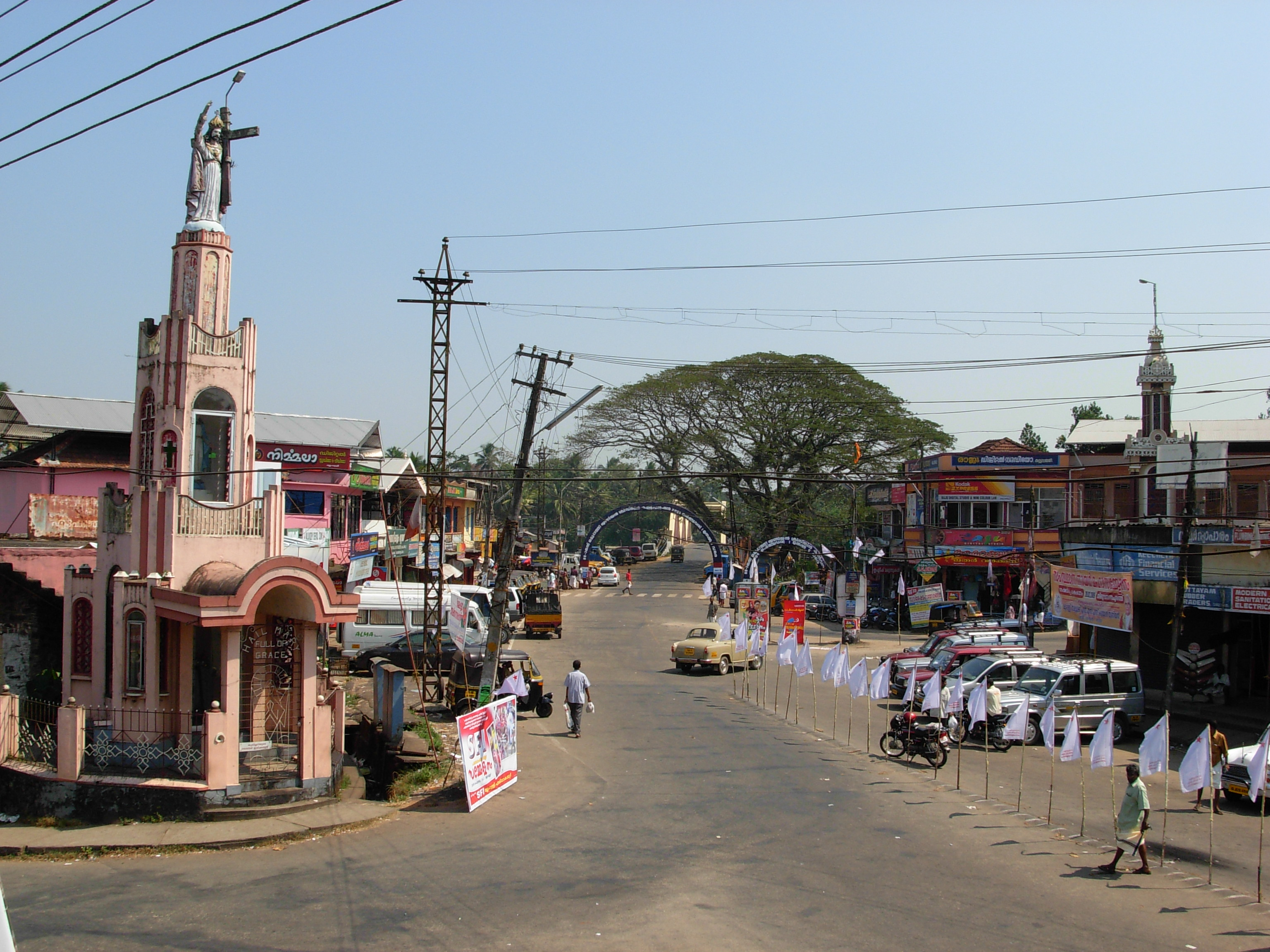
- Mallappally town

- Location in Kerala, India Mallappally (India)
- Coordinates: 9°26′46″N 76°39′24″E
- Country: India
- State: Kerala
- District: Pathanamthitta

Area
  - Total: 19.97 km^{2} (7.71 sq mi)

Population (2011)
  - Total: 17,693
  - Density: 886.0/km^{2} (2,295/sq mi)
- Time zone: UTC+5:30 (IST)
- PIN: 689594, 689585, 689584, 689587
- Vehicle registration: KL-28 (Mallappally)
- Literacy: 96.92%

Mallappally is a revenue village in the Mallappally grama panchayat of Mallappally taluk, Pathanamthitta district, Kerala. It falls under the Thiruvalla Revenue Division and Thiruvalla Constituency. The nearest railway station is Thiruvalla (15 km). As of 2011, Mallappally had a population of 17,693.

Mallappally is the original home of many non-resident Indians, and has one of the lowest population growth and highest literacy rates in India.

== Etymology ==
The name is derived from the Malayalam words മല്ലൻ (Mallan), meaning wrestler, and പള്ളി (palli) meaning shrine.

== Demographics ==
As per the 2011 Indian census, Mallapally has a population of 17,603. It has a sex ratio of 1108 females per 1000 males. Children below 6 years of age constitute 7.25% of the total population. Scheduled Castes and Scheduled Tribes constitute 8.96% and 1.01% of the population respectively. The total literacy rate was 96.92% (96.85% for males and 96.99% for females), which is higher than the state average of 94% and the national average of 74.04%.

== Culture ==
Mallappally is the birthplace of many Christian bishops of Kerala, including St.Dionysius of Vattasseril, Metropolitan Archbishop Valakuzhy Joseph Severios , Cardinal Baselios Cleemis, and Rt. Rev. Mathews Mar Seraphim Episcopa.

=== Places of worship ===
Pathicadu St. Peters and St. Pauls Orthodox Church, built in AD 1888, is located 1 km from the town center. Cornerstone of this church was laid by St.Gregorious of Parumala (Parumala Kochuthirumeni).

The Thirumalida Mahadeva Temple is also located in Mallappally. The temple is dedicated to Lord Shiva in the form of Thirumalida Mahadevan and is renowned for its Manimala river-side setting and grand annual Maha Shivaratri festival, which draws devotees from across the surrounding regions.

=== Festivals ===
Every year during the summer, when the river water recedes, many sandy beds form in the middle of the river that are large enough to hold conventions and festivals. People from various parts of the Mallappally and Tiruvalla taluks come for the festival.

== See also ==
- Mallappally Taluk
- Anikkattilammakshethram
