= Madamon =

- Village
- Madamon vallakadave

- Location in Kerala, India Madamon (India)
- Coordinates: 9°21′45″N 76°50′0″E
- Country: India
- State: Kerala
- District: Pathanamthitta

Languages
  - Official: Malayalam, English
- Time zone: UTC+5:30 (IST)
- PIN: 689711
- Telephone code: 04735-
- Vehicle registration: KL-62
- Nearest city: Pathanamthitta

Madamon is a village located in Ranni-Perunad Panchayat of Ranni Taluk, Pathanamthitta District of Kerala. It is situated in the Western Ghats with undulating terrain. The place is blessed with Pamba, a holy river which flows through it. Pamba River divides Madamon into two as Madamon Vadakkekkara and Thekkekkara. Sabharimala road is going through Thekkekkara and a boat service by PWD connects together.

== Hrishikesha Temple ==
The village is home to the "Hrishikesha Temple" which is a stop over for many pilgrims who pass through this village to the holy shrine Sabarimala, 60 km away. The main festival of this temple is Pathamudayam, meaning the 'tenth sunrise'. This occurs usually on 23 or 24 April, when the sun is exactly over this latitude. This is a 10-day festival considered the main festival for the local community. Similarly the temple celebrates the Sabarimala festive season from mid November to mid January.

== Church of God ==
The main attraction of Vadekkekkara is the Church of God Madamon a Christian church started in 1960 and having meeting every Sunday in Church Hall.

== Madamon Hindu convention ==
There is a yearly convention conducted in Pamba River sand bed by Ezhava Community.

== Schools ==
The village has a government-run upper primary school (classes up to Seventh Standard) and a post office. The village also has a co-operative bank as well as a private bank. There is a library (Granthasala)also that exist in the village.

== Economy ==
Agriculture and remittances are the mainstay of the population. The area has extensive rubber plantations. The villagers also tend cows and produce milk, which is collected by the Milma Co-operative outlet in the village. Many young people are working in Government sector, GCC, Europe, North America and other states of the country. Also people are using auto-rickshas and taxis as a source of employment and livelihood.

== Tourism ==
The village has is known among the Sabarimala pilgrims as a stopover. They take a break for a holy bath in Pamba River as well as for refreshments. The local temple also forms an added attraction.

== Agriculture ==
The villagers are generally farmers growing food items like tapioca, bananas, vegetables, and cash crops like coconut and rubber. They produce betel nut and black pepper. As with most other villages, a large number of the locals work outside the state, even abroad and support the families back in this village.

== Transportation ==
Madamon is divided into Madamon Vadekkekkara and Madamon Thekkekkara. The main Sabarimala Road passes through Vadekkekkara on the other hand Thekkekkara connected to Ranni and Vadasserikkara.
