= Aruvikkuzhy Falls =

- Location within Kerala
- Location: Thadiyoor, Pathanamthitta district, Kerala, India
- Coordinates: 9.371393°N 76.710908°E
- Total height: 100 feet (30 m)

Aruvikkuzhy Falls (not to be confused with Aruvikkuzhi Waterfalls) is a waterfall about 100 feet (30 m) high located about 2km from Thadiyoor and 7km from Kozhencherry in the Pathanamthitta district, Kerala, India. It is now becoming a popular tourist destination.

The word Aruvikkuzhy means "a water stream with depth" in the Malayalam language (aruvi=water stream, kuzhy=deep hole).

== See also ==
- List of waterfalls
- List of waterfalls in India
