= St. Thomas Orthodox Cathedral, Thottamon =

Cathedral church in Kerala, India

St. Thomas Orthodox Cathedral, Thottamon, Ranny, Kerala, India, is one of the newest Cathedral churches in Malankara Orthodox Syrian Church. This is a Cathedral church of Joshua Mar Nicodemus Metropolitan who is the Bishop in charge of Nilakal diocese. This church is situated by the side of Main Eastern Highway (SH-08) which is also known as the Punalur-Pathanamthitta-Muvattupuzha Highway.

== History ==
This church was founded in 1905 and it is one of the oldest churches of Malankara Orthodox Syrian Church in Ranny area. The parish is under the jurisdiction of the Malankara Metropolitan and the Catholicate of the East Baselios Mar Thoma Paulose II of the Malankara Orthodox Syrian Church in India. With over more than 200 families, St Thomas Syrian Orthodox Cathedral is one of the fastest growing parishes in Ranny area. The Church started modestly and has renovated four times with the last, being done alongside the Centenary celebrations of the church in January 2007. The church was known as St Thomas Orthodox Church, Thottomon before its title was increased to St Thomas Orthodox Valliyapally by Moran Mar Baselios Thoma Didymos I. With the formation of new Nilakal diocese around late 2010, Joshua Mar Nicodemus Metropolitan the newly elected bishop chose this church as his cathedral church.
