= Keekozhur =

Keekozhoor
- village
- Location in Kerala, India Keekozhoor (India)
- Coordinates: 9°20′0″N 76°45′0″E
- Country: India
- State: Kerala
- District: Pathanamthitta

Government
  - Body: Ranny

Languages
  - Official: Malayalam, English
- Time zone: UTC+5:30 (IST)
- PIN: 689672
- Nearest city: Ranny
- Lok Sabha constituency: Pathanamthitta
- Civic agency: Ranny

Keekozhur, also spelt as Keekozhoor, is a small village on the side of Pamba River, situated 4 km from Ranni and 9 km from Kozhencherry. It is in the state of Kerala, India. It is 15 km from the Pathanamthitta district headquarters. The village is located under Ranny and Cherukole Panchayats.

== See also ==
- Pathanamthitta
- Sabarimala
- Pune
