= Cherukole =

Cherukole Tricherukole
- village
- Location in Kerala, India Cherukole (India)
- Coordinates: 9.341070°N 76.75995°E
- Country: India
- State: Kerala
- District: Pathanamthitta

Population (2011)
  - Total: 12,169

Languages
  - Official: Malayalam, English
- Time zone: UTC+5:30 (IST)
- PIN: 6XXXXX
- Vehicle registration: KL-62

Cherukole is a village in Pathanamthitta district in the state of Kerala, India.

== Demographics ==
As of 2011 India census, Cherukole had a population of 12,169 with 5,670 males and 6,499 females.

== See also ==
- Ranni
- Keekozhur
- Pathanamthitta district
