= Kalampala =

- village
- Location in Kerala, India Kalampala (India)
- Coordinates: 9°23′0″N 76°44′0″E
- Country: India
- State: Kerala
- District: Pathanamthitta

Languages
  - Official: Malayalam, English
- Time zone: UTC+5:30 (IST)
- PIN: 689674
- Telephone code: +91-473-
- Vehicle registration: KL- 62
- Lok Sabha constituency: Pathanamthitta

Kalampala is a village in Ranni Taluk and Mallapally Taluk in the state of Kerala, India. It is 3 km (1.9 mi) from Ranni Town and 22 km (14 mi) from the Pathanamthitta district headquarters.

There is a church: St Thomas Marthoma Church.

The local school is MTLPS Kalampala.
