= Kollamula =

- village
- Location in Kerala, India Kollamula (India)
- Coordinates: 9°26′10″N 76°52′55″E
- Country: India
- State: Kerala
- District: Pathanamthitta

Government
  - Type: Panchayath

Area
  - Total: 71.12 km^{2} (27.46 sq mi)

Population (2011)
  - Total: 22,449
  - Density: 315.6/km^{2} (817.5/sq mi)

Languages
  - Official: Malayalam, English
- Time zone: UTC+5:30 (IST)
- PIN: 686510
- Vehicle registration: KL-62, KL-34
- Literacy: 97%

Kollamula is a village in Pathanamthitta district in the state of Kerala, India. It is one of the 11 villages in Ranni taluk.

== Demographics ==
As of 2011 India census, Kollamula had a population of 22,449 with 10,932 males and 11,517 females. The majority of people are Christians. Mukkoottuthara is the nearest city in the way of Erumely to Sabarimala.

== See also ==
- Ranni
- Pathanamthitta
