= Pazhavangadi (Pathanamthitta) =

Pazhavangadi Ranni - Pazhavangadi
- village
- Location in Kerala, India Pazhavangadi (India)
- Coordinates: 9.4204200°N 76.797320°E
- Country: India
- State: Kerala
- District: Pathanamthitta District

Government
  - Type: Panchayath
  - Body: Ranni - Pazhavangadi panchayath

Area
  - Total: 26.46 km^{2} (10.22 sq mi)

Population (2011)
  - Total: 20,068
  - Density: 758.4/km^{2} (1,964/sq mi)

Languages
  - Official: Malayalam, English
- Time zone: UTC+5:30 (IST)
- PIN: 689673
- Vehicle registration: KL-62, KL-03
- Nearest city: Ranni

Pazhavangadi is a village in the taluk of Ranni, Pathanamthitta district, in the state of Kerala, India.

== Demographics ==
As of 2011 India census, Pazhavangadi had a population of 20068 with 9618 males and 10450 females.
