= Thadiyoor =

Thadiyoor Edakkadu Market Junction
- village
- Location in Kerala, India Thadiyoor (India)
- Coordinates: 9°23′0″N 76°43′0″E
- Country: India
- State: Kerala
- District: Pathanamthitta

Languages
  - Official: Malayalam, English
- Time zone: UTC+5:30 (IST)
- PIN: 689545
- Telephone code: 0469
- Vehicle registration: KL-28 KL-27 KL-62
- Nearest city: Thiruvalla
- Lok Sabha constituency: Pathanamthitta
- Climate: wet and maritime tropical

Thadiyoor is a town located in the Mallappally and Ranni taluks of the Pathanamthitta district. It is part of both Ezhumattoor and Ayroor Panchayaths and is located approximately 18 km from Thiruvalla and 11 km from Ranni.

== Waterfalls ==
The Aruvikkuzhy falls is located around 1 kilometre (0.62 mi) from the centre of the village and it is very near to the Sreekrishnaswamy temple.

== Charal Kunnu grounds ==
Charalkunnu which is of prominence as a camp centre/convention centre for both religious groups and political parties, is 2 kilometres (1.2 mi) from the village's centre.

== Landmarks ==
- Edakkadu Market
- NSS Higher Secondary School
- BSNL Telephone Exchange
- Carmel Convent English Medium School (CBSE)
- Y's Men Club Thadiyoor
- YMCA Thadiyoor
- Lions Club Thadiyoor
- MCRD
- SreeKantheshwaram mahadeva Temple

== Transportation ==
Thadiyoor does not have a bus station, but it does have buses connecting to all 3 directions Thiruvalla, Kozhenchery and Ranni. The nearest town to Thadiyoor is Kozhencherry, which is 7 kilometres (4.3 mi) away. Thadiyoor lies 118 kilometres (73 mi) away from Thiruvananthapuram the capital of Kerala & 110 kilometres (68 mi) away from Eranakulam IT HUB of Kerala. Geographically Thadiyoor is in key position to travel to Thiruvalla, Ranni, Sabarimala (Pamba) and other places.

== Weekly markets ==
Thadiyoor is the only village with a private market, open on every Wednesday and Saturday in the region.

== Temples ==
The main temples in the area include Aruvikkuzhi Sreekrishna Swami Kshetram, Palakuzhi SreeKantheshwaram mahadeva Kshetram, Sree Puthen Sabarimala Dharma shastha Kshetram, Thelliyoor Kavu Devi Kshetram, Thadiyoor Sree Raja Rajeswari (Jayadhurga), Bhadrakali Kshetram, Palolikkavu Devi Kshetram and Malampara Malayacchan Kshetram.

== Churches ==
St. Ignatious Jacobite Syrian Church, Bethel Marthoma Church, IPC Horeb Church, Church of God in India, Salem Marthoma Church, Immanuel Marthoma Church, St Antonys' Catholic Church, St Francis Xaviour Catholic Church, St Agnes Malankara Catholic Church, Orthodox, Brethren Church, Assemblies of God Church.
