= Chethakkal =

Chethackal
- village
- Location in Kerala, India Chethackal (India)
- Coordinates: 9.438590°N 76.832240°E
- Country: India
- State: Kerala
- District: Pathanamthitta

Population
  - Total: 15,027

Languages
  - Official: Malayalam, English
- Time zone: UTC+5:30 (IST)
- PIN: 6XXXXX
- Vehicle registration: KL-

Chethackal is a village in the Ranni thaluk of Pathanamthitta district in the state of Kerala, India.

== Demographics ==
Chethackal had a population of 15027.
