= Aruvikkuzhi Waterfalls =

Aruvikuzhy Waterfalls
- Location within Kerala
- Location: Pallickathode, Kottayam district, Kerala, India
- Coordinates: 9°36′12″N 76°40′2″E
- Type: Block
- Total height: 31 metres (102 ft)

Aruvikuzhy Waterfalls (not to be confused with Aruvikkuzhy Falls in pathanamthitta, Kerala) is a waterfall in Kottayam district in the Kerala state of India. It is situated 2 km (1.2 mi) from Pallickathode and 7.5 km (4.7 mi) from Pampady. The waterfall measures about 30 ft in height and active only during monsoon. In summer the river almost dries up.

== See also ==
- List of waterfalls
- List of waterfalls in India
