= Thottamon =

Village in Pathanamthitta District, Kerala, India

Thottamon is a village in Ranni, India. The place is home to people of all religious community and well known for its religious harmony and tolerance. Thottamon is an important part of Ranni due to the presence of a large number of Government institution like Ranni Civil Station, Ranni Gramapanchayath office, Thaluk office, Village office, Ranni police station more and more Government offices located at this place (close to Ranni town). It is a small village which lies in the banks of holy river Pamba. It is a golden land known for its fertile soil and availability of water.

The Devi Temple Thottamon Kavu Devi temple is its landmark. Thottamonkavu devi is believed the daughter of Paramashiva so the song "Mukkannan Thirumakale is famous" where Mukkannan is Shivan. It is a part of Ranni Taluk which lies in the valley of the Western Ghats.

Thottamon kavu Devi Temple is a resting place for pilgrims to sabarimala. The temple belongs to some nair families in Ranni. The family who administrated the temple were known as naaluveedanmaar (നാലുവീടന്മാർ), the four nobles. The four Panikar families who held the title were Meempallil, Kerukattu, Pangattu, and Cheruthalayathu. Although the village is small, its proximity to major government organisations like village office, police station, banks, schools, colleges, sub registrar office, temples, churches make it a desirable place for real estate.
