= Angadi (Kerala) =

- village
- Location in Kerala, India Angadi (India)
- Coordinates: 9°22′0″N 76°45′0″E
- Country: India
- State: Kerala
- District: Pathanamthitta

Government
  - Type: Panchayati raj (India)
  - Body: Gram panchayat

Population (2001)
  - Total: 15,873

Languages
  - Official: Malayalam, English
- Time zone: UTC+5:30 (IST)
- Vehicle registration: KL-62

Angadi is a village in Ranni Taluk, Pathanamthitta district in the state of Kerala, India.

== Demographics ==
At the 2001 census, Angadi had a population of 15,873, with 7,696 males and 8,177 females.
