= St. George's Church, Mylapra =

Coordinates: 9°15′49″N 76°47′55″E

Mylapra Valiyapally – St.George Orthodox Church, Mylapra
- സെൻറ് ജോർജ് ഓർത്തഡോൿസ്‌ വലിയ പള്ളി, മൈലപ്ര
- Mylapra Valiyapalli
- Chakkittayil Palli (Chakkittathil)

- Location within India
- Denomination: Malankara Orthodox Syrian Church
- Website: മൈലപ്ര വലിയ പള്ളി

History
- Status: Parish Church
- Dedication: Saint George

Architecture
- Functional status: Active

Administration
- District: Makamkunnu
- Diocese: Thumpamon

Clergy
- Vicar: Rev. Fr. Roy Mathew
- Priest: Rev. Fr. Abey T Samuel (asst.vicar)

Mylapra Valiyapalli or St. George Orthodox Church, Mylapra, referred to as Chakkittayil palli (ചക്കിട്ടേൽ പള്ളി) is a pilgrim center located in the village of Mylapra, in the India state of Kerala. It ia one of the important church in Indian Orthodox Church. The year 52 A.D is dear to the Christian community in kerala as it marks the date when the Apostle Thomas introduced the Gospel to the people in India. He established seven Churches and a chapel before leaving for other places. The buildings did not survive the onslaught of time, and the most famous one in Nilackal in the hills vanished when the flourishing town was overrun by brigands. However, the people held on to the new faith and many escaped to distant places north and south where they worshipped in temporary sheds for centuries. The churches were few and far between so people walked miles to attend services. The people of Mylapra attended Mass, earlier in Thumpamon, or Omalloor and later in Makamkunnu. But even that was too far away for most people so the folk here decided to build their own Church.

In about hundred fifty years, the St. George's Orthodox Church has been housed on six sites. The building consecrated in 2004 was the seventh one to be constructed. To begin with they were all temporary sheds hastily put up to accommodate the parishioners, and the first one to be so built was at konnakote where the Brethren Hall now stands. A difference of opinion caused one group to decide on a new shed for their own use. Priests from the Thengumthara Family would come over to conduct services. However, a mysterious fire burned down the shed and made the parishioners look for a new site. It was then that Karuvancheril Potha Varkey donated 83 cents of the land on which the church now stands to all the 64 members of the church and the new members that had joined. Earlier an oil mill functioned on this land, and so this church has always been known as "chakittayilpally". When over time this fourth church fell into disrepair, laterite bricks and lime were used for a more lasting building on the right side of the road. As early as 1891 Geevarghese Mar Grigorious of Parumala had laid the foundation stone for a permanent building a little to the northeast of this laterite building and soon the parishioners were able to hold their services there in this sixth church.

The Church has chapels in Mundukottackal, Idakkara, Mannapuzha, and Valiyenthi. The churchyard is not large enough to accommodate a bigger cemetery, so a vault was built for the purpose. A very popular part of the church is its wayside Cross at the foot of the hill. There is a belief that a traveller will have no mishaps but will return home safe and sound if he stops to pray by the cross when passing by. In the mornings, there is often a queue of vehicles waiting to make an offering there. Buses, lorries, cars, and two and three wheelers stop for a word of prayer and make an offering. Pilgrims of Sabarimala invariably stop to make an offering. It is indeed a heart-warming sight.
