= Ranni, Kerala =

Ranni
- Taluk
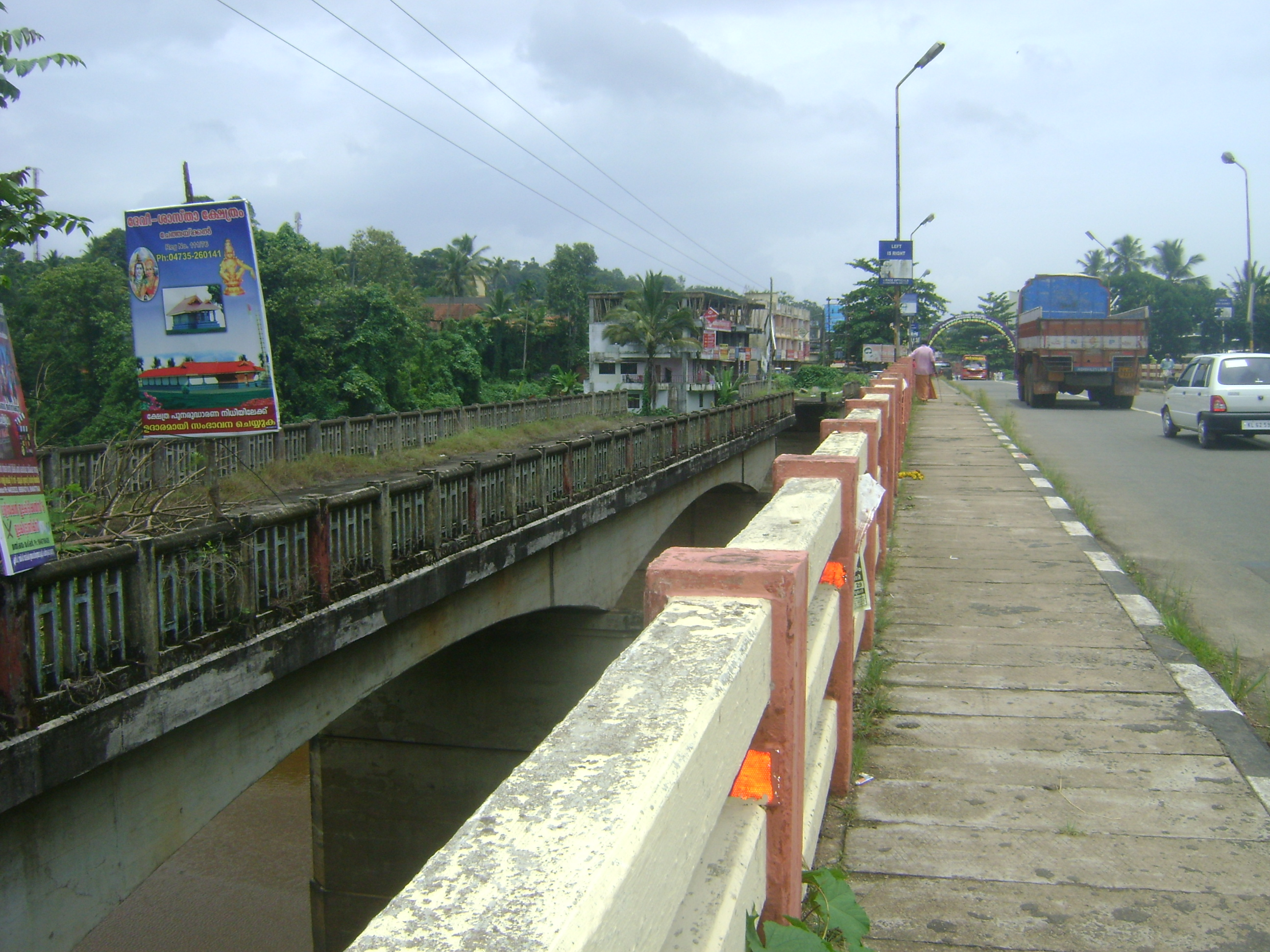
- The dilapidated old bridge and new bridge at Ranni

- Location in Kerala, India Ranni (India)
- Coordinates: 9°22′0″N 76°46′0″E
- Country: India
- State: Kerala
- District: Pathanamthitta

Government
  - Type: Taluk

Area
  - Total: 1,004 km^{2} (388 sq mi)
- Elevation: 331 m (1,086 ft)

Population (2011)
  - Total: 198,194
  - Density: 197.4/km^{2} (511.3/sq mi)

Languages
  - Official: Malayalam, English
- Time zone: UTC+5:30 (IST)
- PIN: 689672
- Telephone code: 04735
- Vehicle registration: KL-62
- Nearest city: Thiruvalla
- Sex ratio: 47:50 ♂/♀
- Literacy: 95%
- Lok Sabha constituency: Pathanamthitta

Ranni (or Ranny) is a town in the Pathanamthitta district of Kerala, India, and the 16th largest taluk in the state. The town is situated on both sides of the Pamba River. It falls under the Thiruvalla Revenue Division and is located 27 km from Thiruvalla railway station and NH 183 in Thiruvalla.

== Etymology ==
The name Ranni is derived from a word in Malayalam which means "queen," or Rani. The town is known as "The Queen of the Eastern Hill Lands" (മലനാടിന്റെ റാണി).

== History ==
The history of Ranni can be traced back 5000 years to the early settlement of Adi Dravidans around Sabarimala and Nilakkal. An ancient trade route used to pass through Nilackal between Kerala and the Pandian kingdom.

The former rulers of Ranni were known as the Ranni Karthas, or the Karthkal of Ranni, the "Samanthas," and a blood-related family of Thekkamamkoor Raja. In the 18th century, Anizham Thirunal Marthandavarma of Vennad annexed the Thekkamkoor kingdom and confiscated all the lands that belonged to the former rulers.

Ranni Karthas Koyikal (the Ranni Karth Palace) was located in Areekkal. The Ranni Karthas also built the Ranni Manjor Ramapuram temple. The temple is the same architecturally as the Aranmula Sreeparthasaradhy temple but the darshan of the former faces south.

Ranni was a part of the Central Travancore region before the unification of India. Until the formation of Pathanamthitta district in 1982, Ranni was a part of the Kollam district.

== Geography ==
Ranni is located in southwestern India at 9.38°N 76.81°E. It has an average elevation of 131 m (433 ft) above sea level. However, towards the east, the elevation is much higher. The river Pamba flows through Ranni township. According to the 2001 Census of India, Ranni spans a total of 1,004.61 square kilometres (387.88 sq mi). Out of the total area, 708 square kilometres (273.36 sq mi) or 70% are forest.

== Climate ==
Climate data for Ranni, Kerala
Month	Jan	Feb	Mar	Apr	May	Jun	Jul	Aug	Sep	Oct	Nov	Dec	Year
Mean daily maximum °C (°F)	31.2 (88.2)	32.0 (89.6)	33.1 (91.6)	33.2 (91.8)	32.7 (90.9)	30.6 (87.1)	29.8 (85.6)	30.0 (86.0)	30.4 (86.7)	30.4 (86.7)	30.1 (86.2)	30.6 (87.1)	31.2 (88.1)
Mean daily minimum °C (°F)	22.4 (72.3)	23.2 (73.8)	24.6 (76.3)	25.5 (77.9)	25.5 (77.9)	24.3 (75.7)	23.7 (74.7)	23.9 (75.0)	23.9 (75.0)	23.9 (75.0)	23.4 (74.1)	22.5 (72.5)	23.9 (75.0)
Average precipitation mm (inches)	21 (0.8)	38 (1.5)	66 (2.6)	158 (6.2)	266 (10.5)	482 (19.0)	468 (18.4)	325 (12.8)	247 (9.7)	321 (12.6)	213 (8.4)	58 (2.3)	2,663 (104.8)
Source: Climate-Data.org

Like the rest of Kerala, Ranni has a wet and maritime tropical climate. The region receives most of the rain from the southwest monsoon from June to August and the northeast monsoon during October and November. With river Pamba overflowing, Ranni is always under a threat of floods during monsoons. Although the summer is from March to May, the area receives locally developed thunderstorms in May. Due to the higher elevation, the climate is cooler in the east.

== Demographics ==
As of 2011, Ranni taluk had a census population of 198,194, of which 94,773 were males and 103,421 were females. The female-to-male ratio is 1091:1000, higher than the state average and significantly higher than the national average. There were 53,172 households within the taluk's limits. A very low housing density is owed to a large reserved forest area. Ranni's literacy rate is 95%.

Although most of the residents are Malayalis there are some Tamil, Sikh, Bihari, and Bengali settlers. Much of the population are temporary workers who are employed in the construction sector. The population of migrant workers from the northern parts of India has increased over the last few years because of the shortage of local unskilled manpower. A few settlements of aborigines known as 'adivasis' are deep in the forest area.

Ranni's major religions are Hinduism and Christianity.

== Administration ==
Ranni taluk is administered under the Pathanamthitta district. The taluk headquarters is at Block Pady. Ranni taluk is divided into 11 villages:

- Ranni-Angadi
- Chittar
- Ranni-Pazhavangadi
- Ranni-Perunad
- Ayroor
- Kollamula
- Vadasserikkara
- Athikayam
- Ranni
- Chethakkal
- Cherukole

== Economy ==
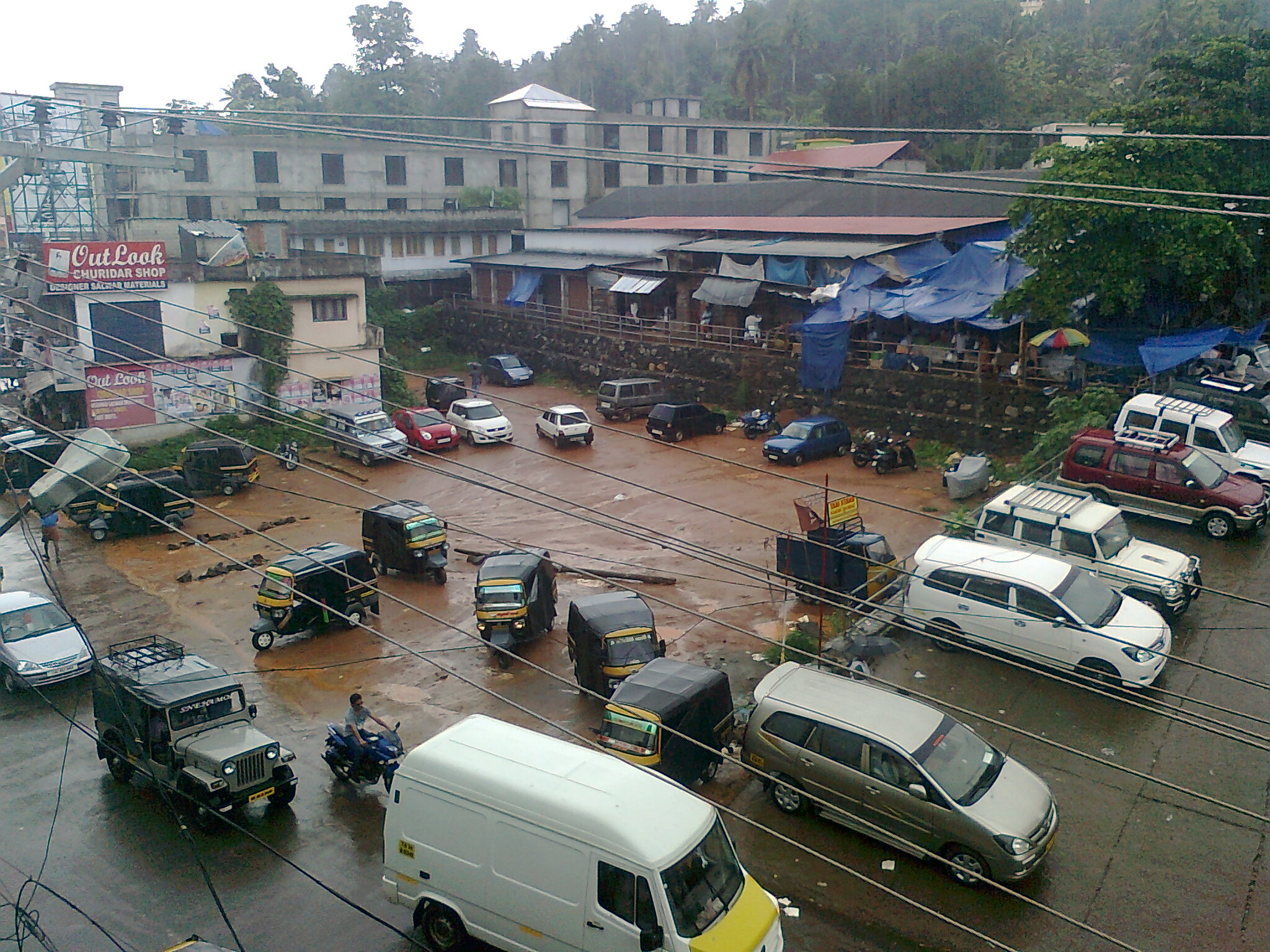
Ranni market on a rainy evening

Commerce in Ranni is centered around a market in the main township, Ittiyappara, which is situated on the northern side of the river. The economy of Ranni is primarily based on agriculture. The hilly terrain, high humidity, and good rain make it suitable for rubber cultivation, and Ranni is one of the largest rubber-producing taluks in Kerala. Other major crops are cocoa, coconut, tapioca and black pepper. Ranni taluk has the largest Non-resident Indian (NRI) population in the state of Kerala, which is another major source of income.

== Transport ==
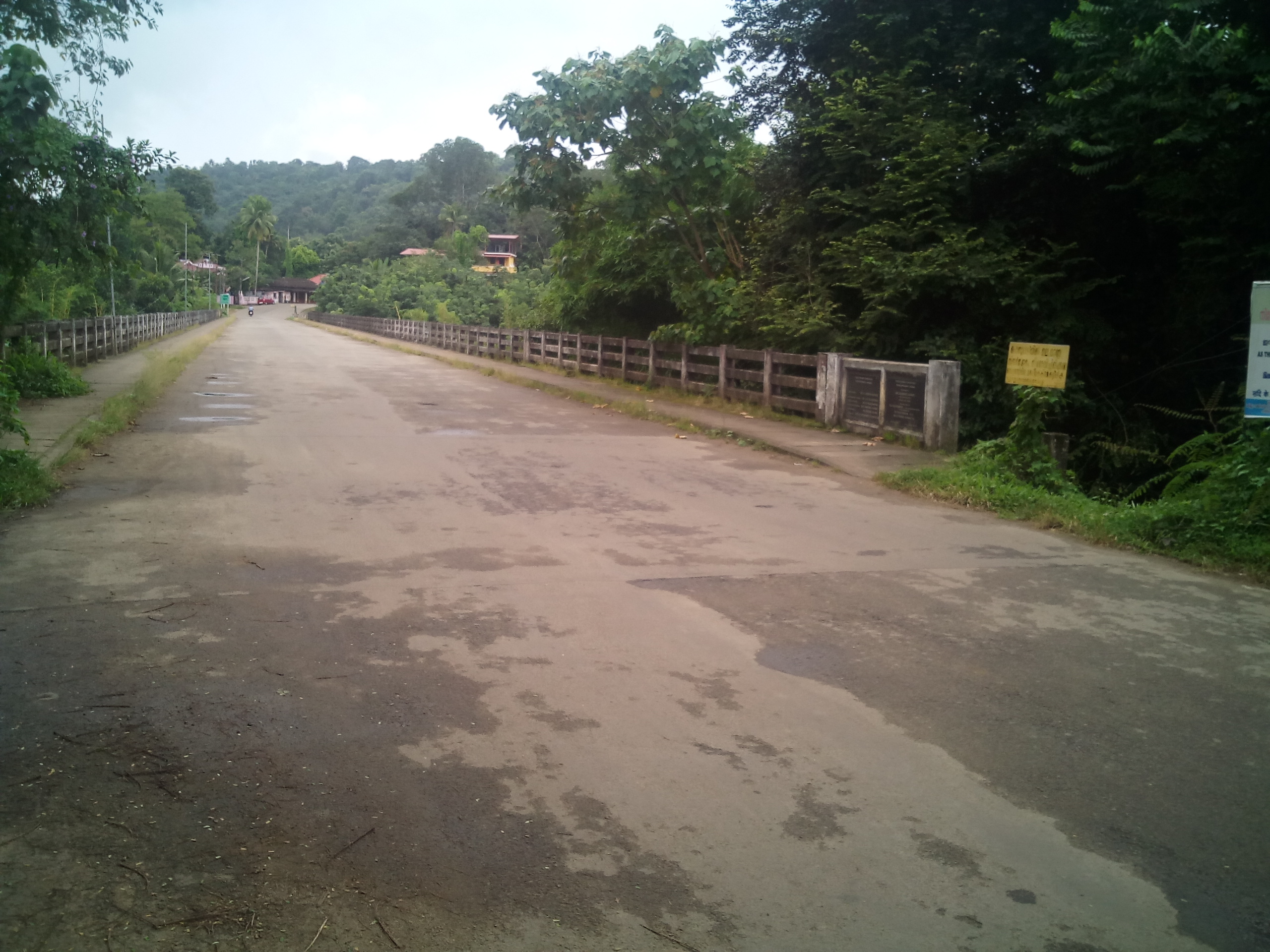
Bridge near Vadasserikara

Ranni is largely dependent on private buses, and most long-route Kerala State Road Transport Corporation (KSRTC) buses use State Highway 08. There is a KSRTC bus depot in Ranni adjacent to the private bus stand. Auto rickshaws are also available and are generally hired for short distances (1–3 km) where bus services are lacking. Jeeps are another preferred mode of transport where the terrain is hilly or rugged.

A train service connecting Ranni to industrial centers is a long-standing demand of citizens. Although the Union Government cleared a railway proposal in 1995, the project awaits implementation. The nearest railway station is at Thiruvalla which is nearly 27 km (17 mi) away.

The proposed Sabari International Airport, Cheruvally, would be the closest airport upon completion, at 10 km (6.2 mi) from Ranni township. The nearest extant airports are Cochin International Airport (110 km) and Thiruvananthapuram International Airport, at 110 and 125 km (68 and 78 mi), respectively.

== Education ==
Primary, middle, and secondary schools are available in all the villages of Ranni taluk. However, there are only seven senior secondary schools covering six of the eleven villages. This is primarily because before 1997–98, secondary education was offered as pre-degree courses in colleges. As of 2001, there are 138 primary, 59 middle, and 35 secondary schools.

There are three colleges in Ranni taluk. St. Thomas college, Ranni, an arts and science college established in 1964, is affiliated with Mahatma Gandhi University (MG University). For almost four decades this was the only college in the taluk. In 2005, Caarmel Engineering College, a self-financing engineering college, was established in the Ranni-Perunad division but closed due to a financial crisis. The Vishwa Bhramana Arts College and Government Polytechnic College are situated in Vechuchira. The Mar Thoma Teachers’ Training College Ranni is a self-financing institution affiliated with MG University and approved by NCTE.

Ranni also has three adult literacy centers. Ranni is a hub of central board schools with St. Mary's School, Ranni, an institution active for over 40 years. Cornerstone International School (including Cornerstone Kidscenter) and Citadel are other secondary options among CBSE schools. These literacy centers, or "Saksharatha Kendram" came as a state effort to attain 100% adult literacy.

== Politics ==
The Ranni assembly constituency is part of Pathanamthitta (Lok Sabha constituency). The main political parties are the Indian National Congress (INC), Communist Party of India (Marxist) (CPM), Communist Party of India (CPI), and Kerala Congress. The BJP (Bharatiya Janatha Party), now AAP (Aam Aadmi Party), has significant influence in the election. Pramod Narayan is the elected representative of the Ranni assembly constituency. He successfully contested the assembly election in 2021.

== Media ==
There are three local television channels in Ranni. Citi TV, the channel, established in 2002, telecasts news, documentaries, advertisements, albums, and other programs. Malanad TV operates from Pazhavangadi. Vismaya TV, established in 2014, is the largest local channel in Pathanamthitta district.

== Culture ==
The Hindu temple of Sabarimala is located in this taluk, situated approximately 66 km (41 mi) from the town of Ittiyappara.

The Devi Temple Thottamon Kavu is another landmark of Ranni. It is a resting place for pilgrims to Sabarimala and belongs to a few nair families in Ranni. The family that administrates the temple is known as naaluveedanmaar (നാലുവീടന്മാർ), or "the four nobles". The four Panikar families who hold the title are the Meempallil (മീമ്പള്ളിൽ), Kerukattu (കേറുകാട്ട്), Pangattu (പങ്ങാട്ട്), and Cheruthalayathu (ചെറുതാലയത്ത്).

In the 18th century, Knanaya Christians migrated to Ranni Kallissery established the St. Thomas Church of Ranni. A significant number of Malankara Orthodox Christians and Mar Thomites also migrated from surrounding areas. In the early 19th century, Dr. Claudius Buchanan visited Ranni and was presented with an old handwritten Syriac Bible from Ranni St. Thomas Church.

== See also ==
- Angadi
- Angamoozhy
- Kalampala
- Keekozhur
- Pathanamthitta district
- Perunad
- Sabarimala
- Thottamon
- Kozhencherry
- Aranmula
