= Pathanamthitta district =

- District
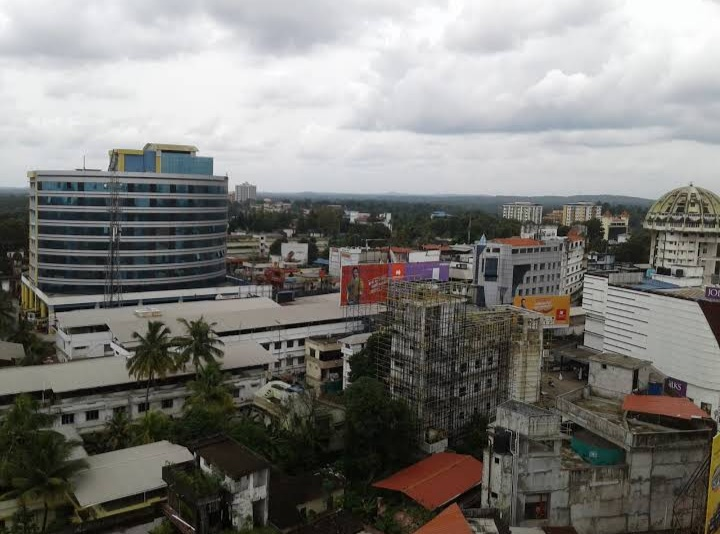
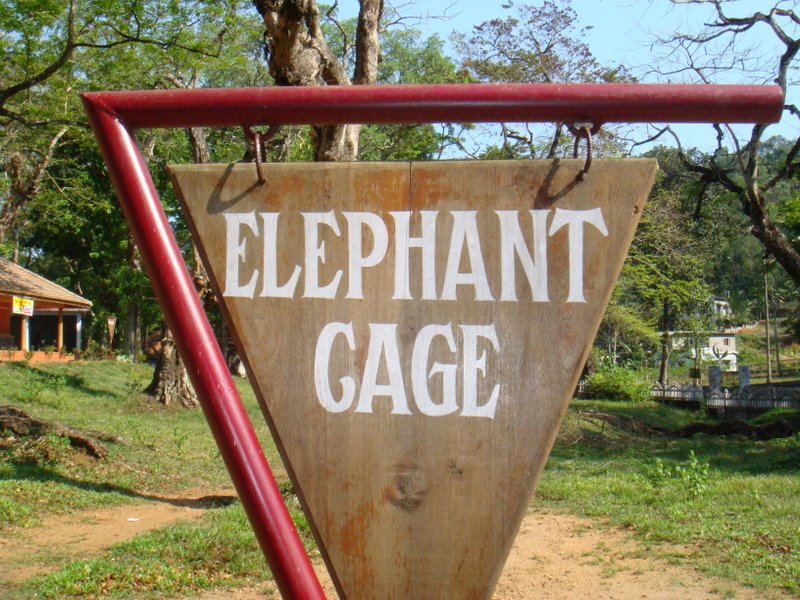
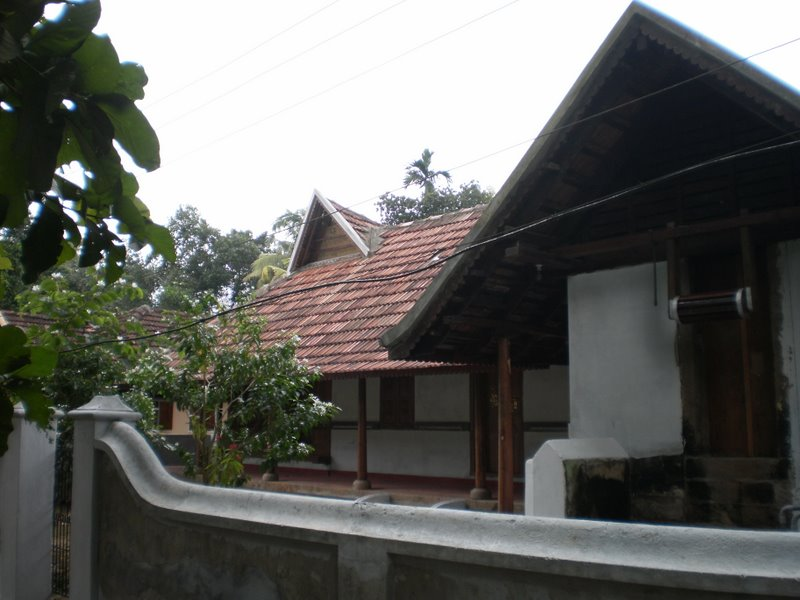
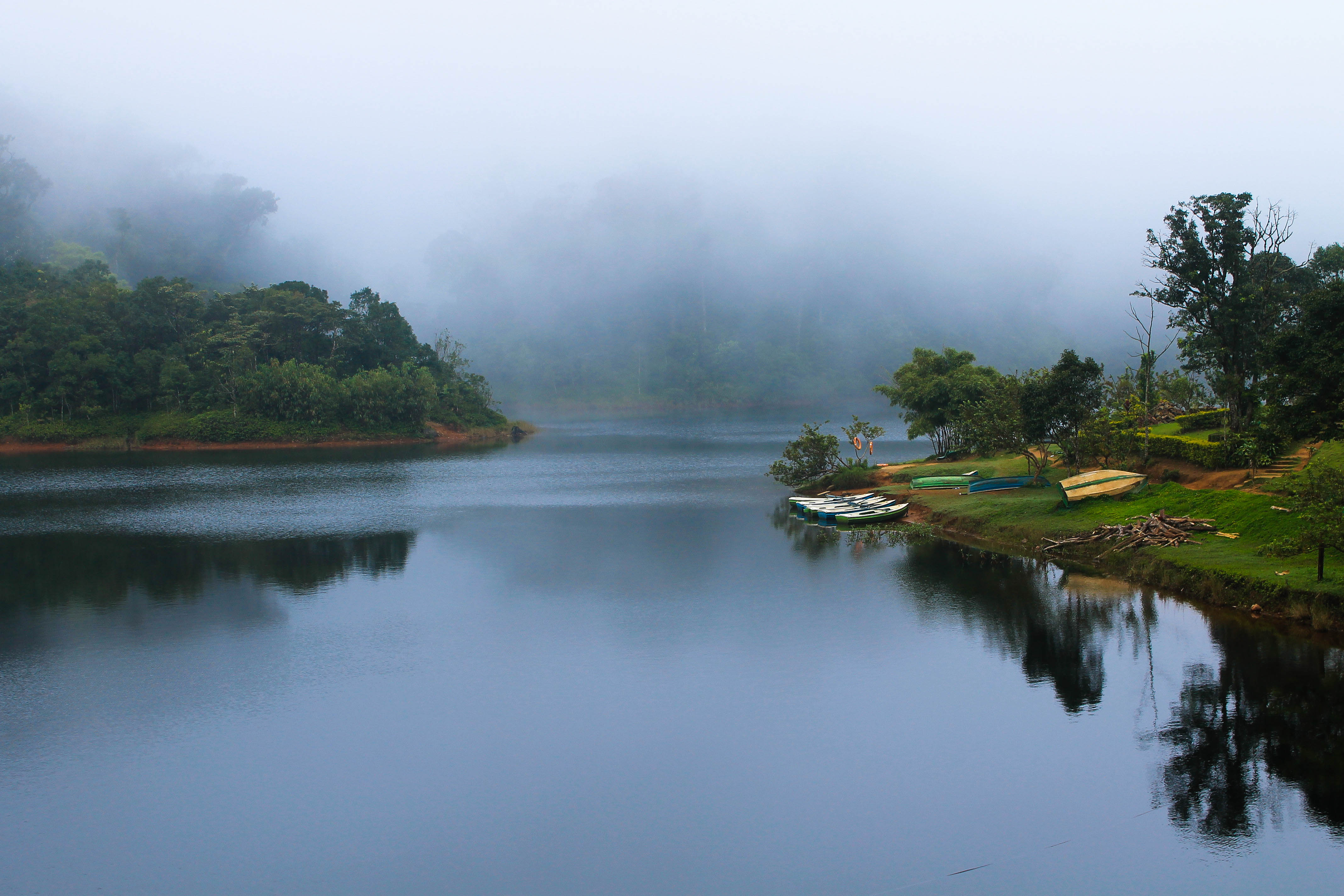
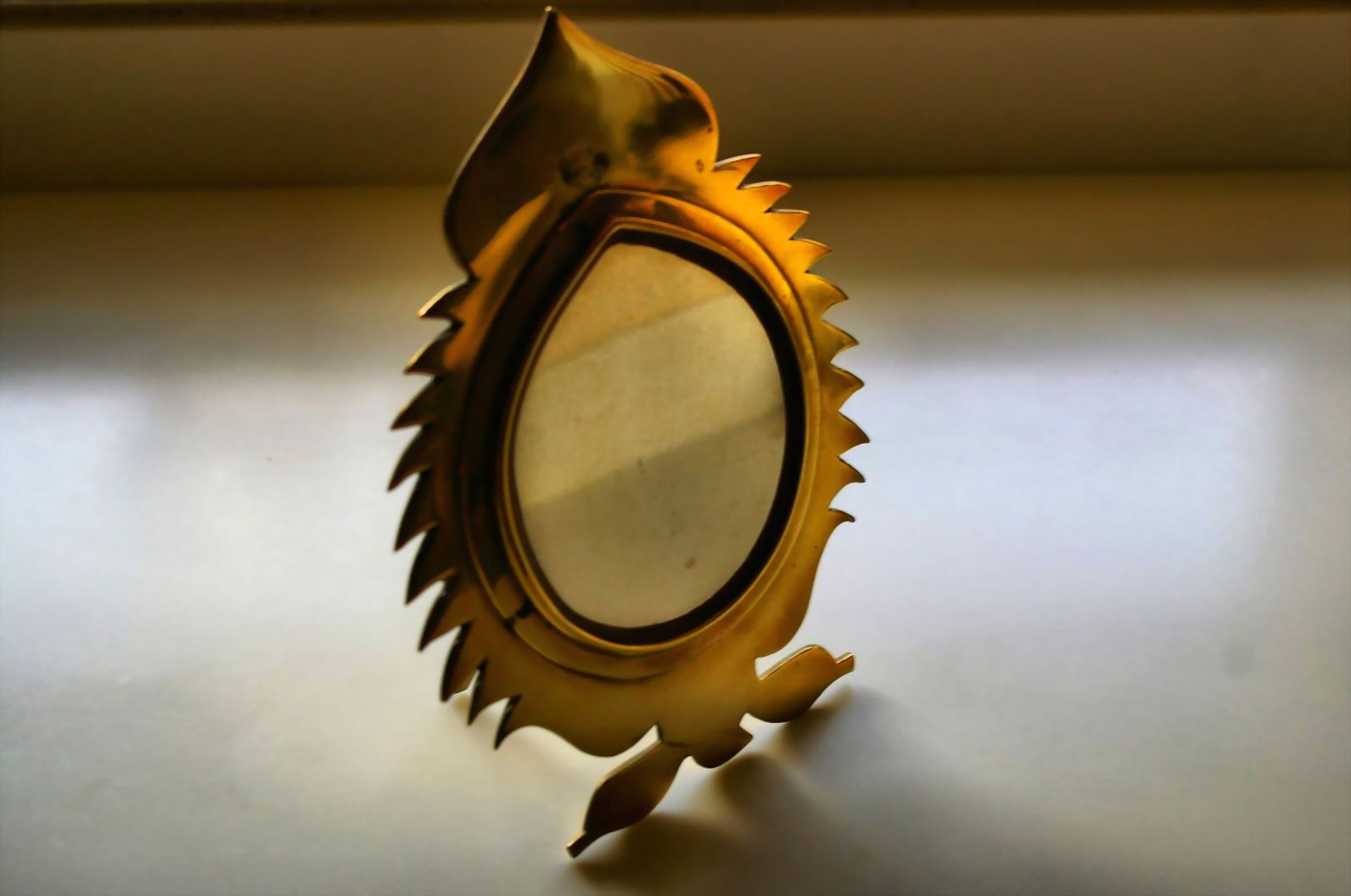
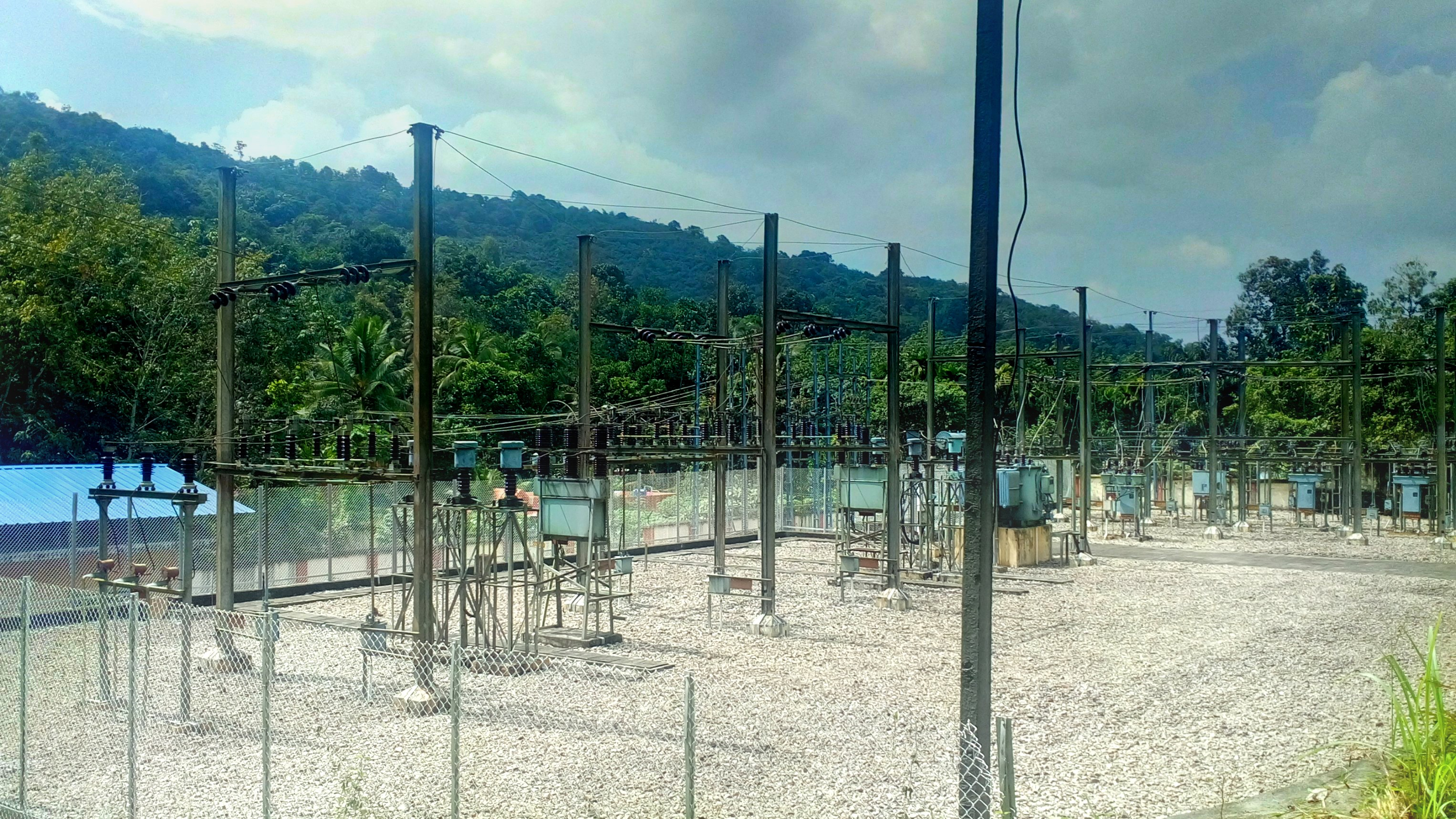
- Clockwise from top: Thiruvalla town, Aranmula Kottaram, Aranmula kannadi, 33 Kilovolt Substation at Ranni-Perunad, Gavi, and Elephant Training Center, Konni.

- Location in Kerala
- Pathanamthitta district
- Coordinates: 9.28068°N 76.86967°E
- Country: India
- State: Kerala
- Founder: K. K. Nair
- Headquarters: Collectorate, Pathanamthitta
- Subdivisions: Revenue Divisions: 2: Pathanamthitta; Adoor; Taluks: 5: Pathanamthitta; Adoor; Ranni; Konni; Mallappally

Government
  - District Collector: Nizamudeen A , IAS
  - District Police Chief: R Anand. IPS

Area
  - Total: 2,642 km^{2} (1,020 sq mi)
  - Rank: 6th

Population (2011)
  - Total: 1,197,412
  - Density: 452/km^{2} (1,170/sq mi)

Languages
  - Official: Malayalam
- Time zone: UTC+5:30 (IST)
- ISO 3166 code: IN-KL
- Vehicle registration: KL-03 Pathanamthitta, KL-26 Adoor, KL-27 Thiruvalla, KL-28 Mallapally, KL-62 Ranni, KL-83 Konni
- HDI (2005): ▲0.795 ( High)
- Website: pathanamthitta.nic.in/en/

Pathanamthitta district (IPA: [pɐt̪ːɐnɐn̪d̪iʈːɐ]), is one of the 14 districts in the Indian state of Kerala. The district headquarters is in the town of Pathanamthitta. There are four municipalities in Pathanamthitta: Adoor, Pandalam, Pathanamthitta and Thiruvalla and Major Towns of Konni, Kozhenchery, Ranni, and Mallappally.

According to the 2011 Census of India, the population was 1,197,412, making it the third least populous district in Kerala (out of 14), after Wayanad and Idukki. Pathanamthitta has been declared the first polio-free district in India. The district is 10.03% urbanised. The district spans 2,652 km², more than half of which is covered by forest.

== Etymology ==
The district's name is a combination of two Malayalam words, pathanam and thitta, which together mean 'array of houses on the river side'. The district capital is located on the banks of the river Achankovil.

== History and formation ==
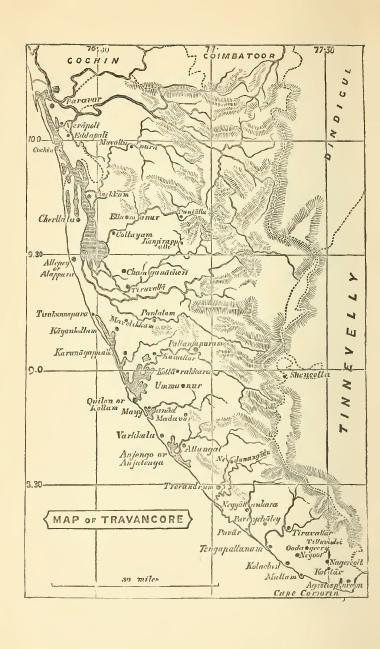
A map of the British Princely state of Travancore published in 1871

It is presumed that the regions that form the district were formerly under the rule of Pandalam, which had connections with the Pandya kingdom. When Pandalam was added to the princely state of Travancore in 1820, the region came under Travancore administration. The Nedumpuram Palace near Thiruvalla belongs to Valluvanad Royal family. Pathanamthitta district, along with most parts of Alappuzha district, was part of the Quilon division of the Travancore Kingdom until 1949.

The district was formed on 1 November 1982 as a reward to K. K. Nair, who was the then Pathanamthitta MLA, by K. Karunakaran. The formation was done by incorporating various portions of the erstwhile Kollam, Alappuzha and Idukki districts. While the taluks Adoor, Konni, Pathanamthitta, Kozhencherry and Ranni were taken from Kollam district; Pandalam, Kulanada, Aranmula, Kumbanad, Parumala, Thiruvalla and Mallapally were taken from Alappuzha district; and Sabarimala from Idukki district.

=== Cultural revival ===
Pathanamthitta, being a land of culture and learning, could bring together the literary talents of two centuries in a single volume called Desathuti: Pathanamthitta Kavithakal. Unnikrishnan Poozhikkad collected 184 poems from different poets of Pathanamthitta starting in the 18th century.

== Geography ==
Pathanamthitta is a landlocked district, located at 9°16′N 76°47′E, spanning over an area of 2,637 square kilometres (1,018.15 sq mi). The district is bordered by the districts Kottayam and Idukki districts in the north, Alappuzha district in the west, Kollam district in the south. To the east it borders the Tenkasi district of the Tamil Nadu state. Devar Mala is the highest point in Pathnamthitta District.

The district can be divided into three natural geographical regions: the highland, the midland and the lowland. The highland stretches through the Western Ghats, where the hills are tall and covered with thick forests. Western Ghats maintains an average altitude of around 800 m. It descends to the smaller hills of midland in the centre and finally to the lowland. The lowland with its abundance of coconut trees, lies along the eastern borders of Alappuzha district. (western part of Tiruvalla Taluk)

=== Forest ===
Pathanamthitta district has a reserve forest area of 1,385.27 square kilometres (534.86 sq mi). This is approximately 50% of the total district area. The forest area can broadly be classified as evergreen, semi-evergreen and moist deciduous. The forest is the main source of raw materials for wood based industrial units. Timber is the most important produce.

=== Rivers ===
Three important rivers flow through the district. These rivers originate from various mountains of the Western Ghats mountain range. The Pamba (176 km or 109 mi), which is the third longest river in Kerala, has its origin in Pulachimala. The Achankovil river (128 km or 80 mi) originates from Pasukida Mettu, and Manimala river (90 km or 56 mi) originates from the Thattamalai hills. A small portion of Kallada river also falls in the southern border of the district. Pamba, Achankovil and Manimala rivers together drain more than 70% of the total area of Pathanamthitta.

== Administration ==
=== District administration ===
The district headquarters is at Pathanamthitta town. The district administration is headed by the District Collector. He is assisted by five Deputy Collectors holding charges of general matters, revenue recovery, land acquisition, land reforms and election. Pathanamthitta town is the administrative headquarters of the Pathanamthitta district. The district is divided into two revenue divisions for land revenue administration—Thiruvalla and Adoor. Each division is headed by a Revenue Divisional Officer (RDO), who is either a Sub Collector (IAS) or an officer from the Deputy Collector cadre. Each revenue division consists of several taluks, each headed by a Tahsildar, and each taluk comprises a group of revenue villages.

=== Taluks ===
The district is divided into two revenue divisions which together incorporate six Taluks within them.

- Taluks in the Thiruvalla Revenue Division are:

Thiruvalla	Mallappally	Ranni

- Taluks in the Adoor Revenue Division are:

Kozhencherry	Adoor	Konni

=== Revenue villages ===
Pathanamthitta district is divided into 70 revenue villages for the ease and decentralisation of its revenue administration. They are further incorporated into 6 taluks as eludicated below.

==== Thiruvalla Taluk ====
- Eraviperoor
- Kadapra
- Kaviyoor
- Kavumbhagom
- Koipuram
- Kuttappuzha
- Kuttoor
- Nedumpuram
- Niranam
- Peringara
- Thiruvalla
- Thottapuzhassery

==== Mallappally Taluk ====
- Anicadu
- Ezhumattoor
- Kallooppara
- Kottangal
- Kunnamthanam
- Mallappally
- Perumpetty
- Puramattam
- Thelliyoor

==== Ranni Taluk ====
- Athikkayam
- Ayiroor
- Cherukole
- Chethakkal
- Kollamula
- Perunad
- Ranni
- Ranni-Angadi
- Ranni-Pazhavangadi
- Vadasserikara

==== Kozhencherry Taluk ====
- Aranmula
- Chenneerkara
- Elanthoor
- Kidangannoor
- Kozhencherry
- Kulanada
- Mezhuveli
- Naranganam
- Omallur
- Pathanamthitta

==== Adoor Taluk ====
- Adoor
- Angadickal
- Enadimangalam
- Enathu
- Erathu
- Ezhamkulam
- Kadampanad
- Kodumon
- Kurampala
- Pallickal
- Pandalam
- Pandalam Thekkekara
- Peringanadu
- Thumpamon

==== Konni Taluk ====
- Ayravon
- Aruvappulam
- Chittar
- Kalanjoor
- Konni
- Konnithazham
- Koodal
- Malayalappuzha
- Mylapra
- Pramadom
- Seethathodu
- Thannithode
- Vallicode
- Vallicode-Kottayam

=== Local self-government institutions ===
Under the three tier system of panchayat in rural areas, Pathanamthitta has one district panchayat, 9 block panchayat and 57 grama panchayats. Under the single tier system in urban areas, there are 4 municipalities in the district.

==== Municipal towns ====
- Thiruvalla
- Pathanamthitta
- Adoor
- Pandalam

==== Proposed Municipalities ====
- Kozhencherry
- Ranni

=== Legislative representation ===
As per the Delimitation of Parliamentary and Assembly Constituencies Order, 2008, Pathanamthitta has five Assembly constituencies, down from eight. However, the district was unified into a single Parliamentary constituency, thus contributing a seat to the Lok Sabha. The Pathanamthitta parliamentary constituency is formed by including all the five state legislative assembly constituencies of the district along with two other assembly constituencies in the neighbouring Kottayam district.

There is a Lok Sabha constituency in Pathanamthitta: Pathanamthitta.

District	No.	Constituency	Name	Party	Alliance	Remarks
Pathanamthitta	111	Thiruvalla	Varghese Mammen	KC	UDF	
Pathanamthitta	112	Ranni	Pazhakulam Madhu	INC	UDF	
Pathanamthitta	113	Aranmula	Abin Varkey	INC	UDF	
Pathanamthitta	114	Konni	K. U. Jenish Kumar	CPI(M)	LDF	
Pathanamthitta	115	Adoor (SC)	Adv. C. V. Santhakumar	INC	UDF	

== Demographics ==
Historical population
Year	Pop.	±% p.a.
1901	276,251	—
1911	317,072	+1.39%
1921	375,935	+1.72%
1931	478,345	+2.44%
1941	576,436	+1.88%
1951	719,272	+2.24%
1961	888,272	+2.13%
1971	1,028,208	+1.47%
1981	1,125,345	+0.91%
1991	1,188,332	+0.55%
2001	1,234,016	+0.38%
2011	1,197,412	−0.30%

According to the 2011 census Pathanamthitta district has a population of 1,197,412, roughly equal to the nation of Timor-Leste or the US state of Rhode Island. This gives it a ranking of 399th in India (out of a total of 640). The district has a population density of 453 inhabitants per square kilometre (1,170/sq mi). Its population growth rate over the decade 2001–2011 was −3.12%. Pathanamthitta has a sex ratio of 1129 females for every 1000 males, and a literacy rate of 96.93%. 10.99% of the population lives in urban areas. Scheduled Castes and Scheduled Tribes make up 13.74% and 0.68% of the population respectively.

Malayalam is the predominant language, spoken by 99.13% of the population. Small minorities of Tamil speakers live in urban areas.

According to the Census of India 2001, the district had a population of 1,234,016 with a density of 467 persons per square kilometre. This is the lowest density in the State after Idukki and Wayanad. Schedule tribes and castes comprise 13% of the total population. The female to male ratio is 1094:1000, which is the highest among the districts in the State.

=== Religion ===
Religions in Pathanamthitta district (2011)
Religion	Percent
Hinduism	56.93%
Christianity	38.12%
Islam	4.60%
Other or not stated	0.35%

Hinduism (57%) is followed by the majority of population of Pathanamthitta. Christians (Malankara Orthodox, Marthoma Church and Pentecostal) (38%) form significant minority.

Religion-wise population percentage in Pathanamthitta district by taluk (2011 Census)
Taluk	Hindus (%)	Muslims (%)	Christians (%)	Others / Not stated (%)
Adoor	66.68	6.52	26.54	0.26
Kozhenchery	61.01	4.95	33.63	0.41
Mallappally	43.69	4.61	51.30	0.40
Ranni	50.27	3.99	45.27	0.47
Thiruvalla	51.39	1.99	46.35	0.27

== Transportion ==
Air Transport

The nearest airports are Thiruvananthapuram International airport and Cochin International airport.Aranmula International airport was proposed but cancelled in 2018.The Sabarimala International airport is proposed near Erumeli.

Road Transport

The 2 National Highways going through Pathanamthitta district are National Highway 183 and National Highway 183A.Other important roads are State Highway 1,State Highway 7,Main Eastern Highway and State Highway 9 (Kerala).

Rail Transport

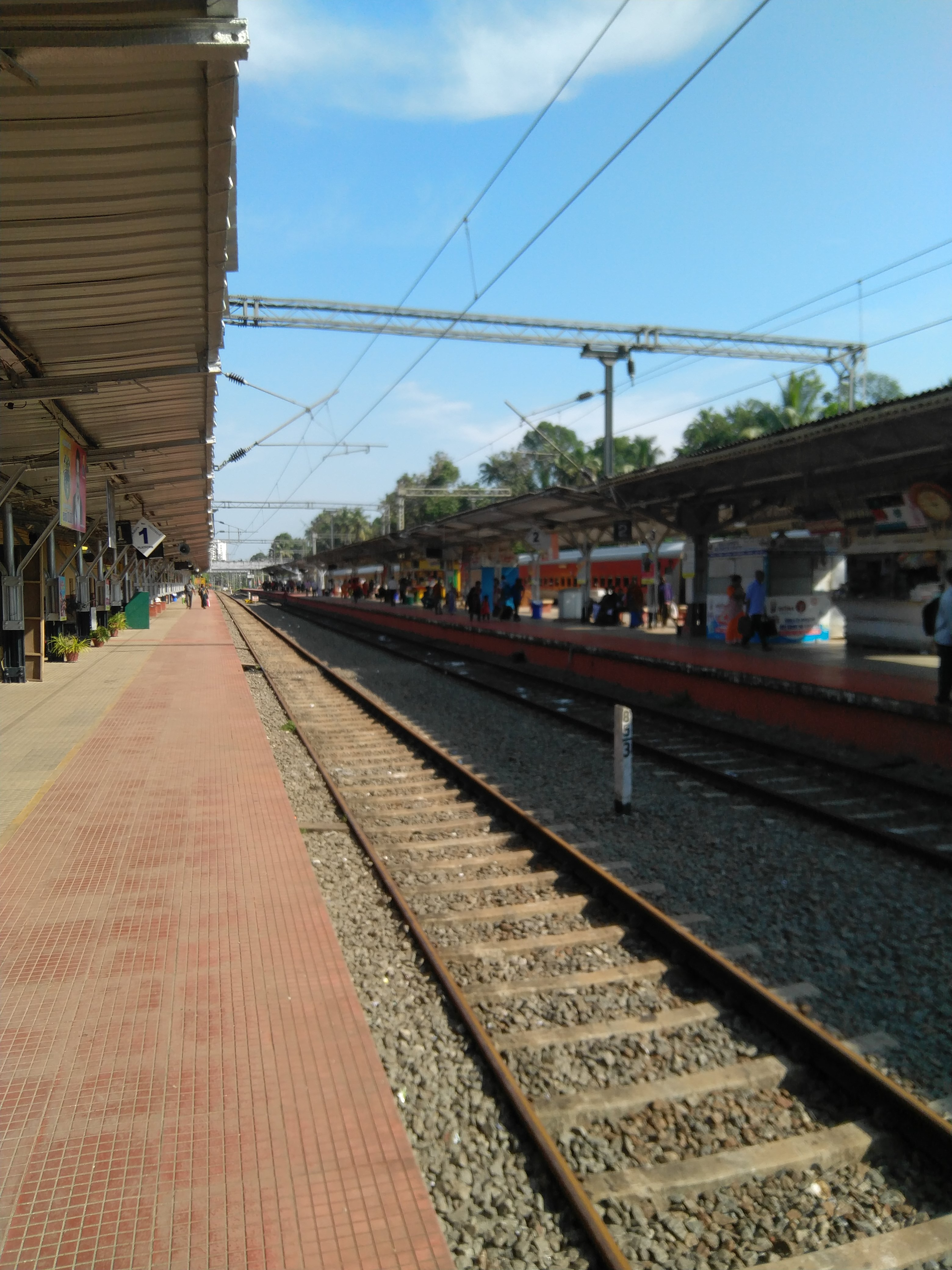
Railway Track

The only railway station in Pathanamthitta district is Tiruvalla railway station. Other nearby railway stations are Changanserry, Chengannur and Kottayam.

== Major towns ==
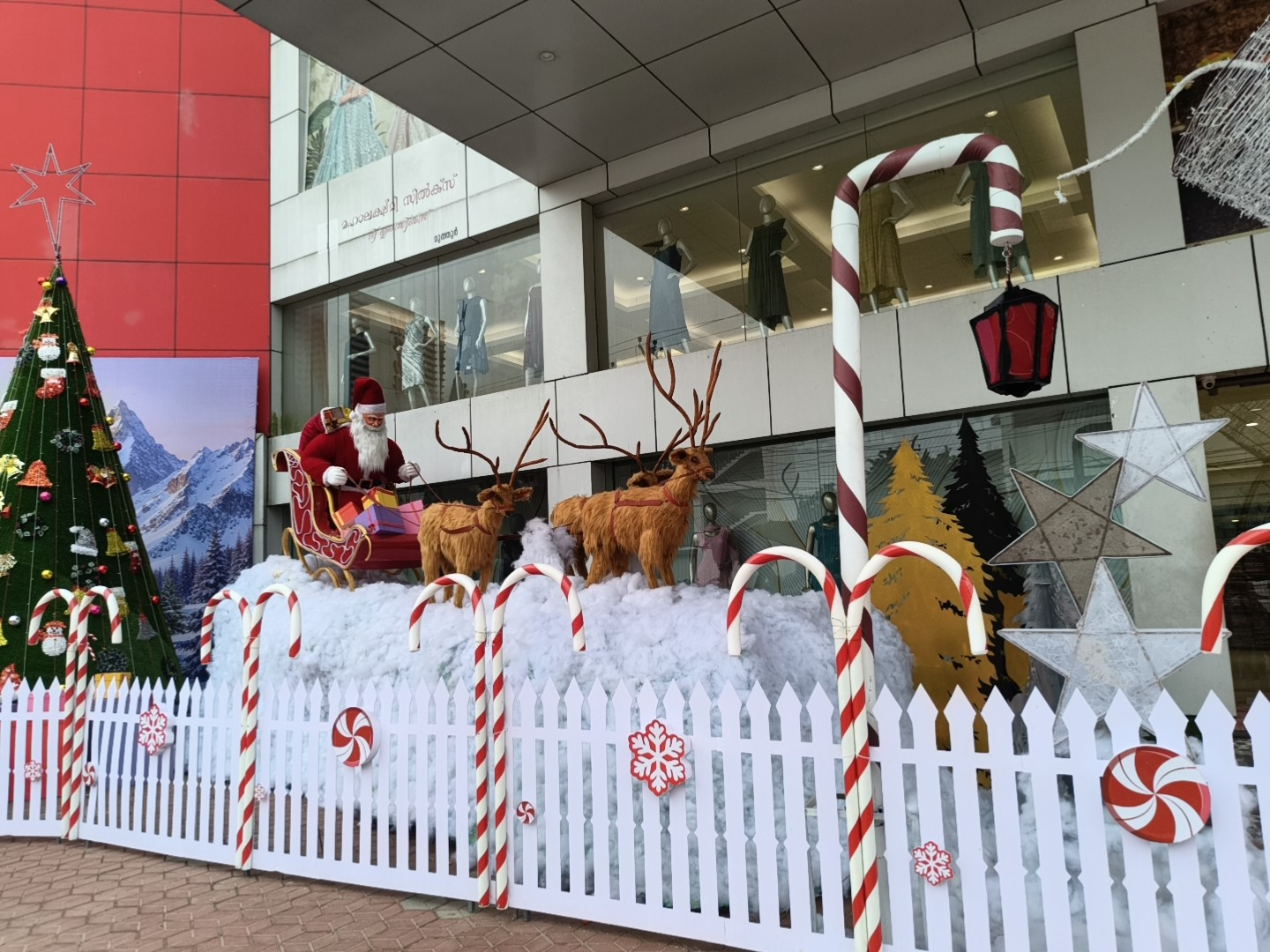
Christmas Decoration of Mahalekshmi Silks, Thiruvalla.

The major towns in the district include:

- Thiruvalla taluk: Thiruvalla, Erviperoor, Kadapra, Kumbanad, Pullad, Kuttoor, Kaviyoor, Nedupram
- Mallapally taluk: Vennikulam, Mallappally, Ezhumattoor, Kalloopara
- Ranni taluk: Ranni, Vadasserikara, Athikayam, Vechoochira, Thadiyoor
- Kozhencherry taluk: Aranmula, Kozhencherry, Kidangannoor, Kumbazha, Kulanada, Elanthoor
- Adoor taluk: Adoor, Pandalam, Kalanjoor, Kodumon, Enadimangalam
- Konni taluk: Konni, Koodal, Chittar, Seethathode, Thannithode, Aruvapulam

== Tourism ==
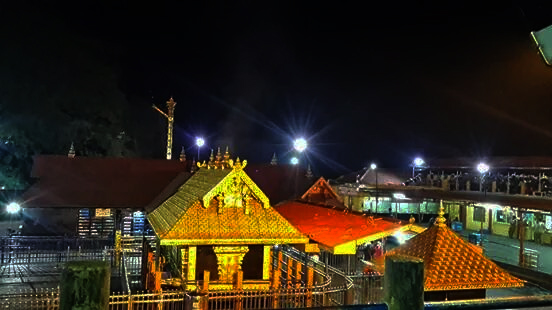
Sabarimala

With a number of fairs and festivals, Pathanamthitta district is known as the "headquarters of pilgrimage tourism." The district receives an estimated 3 to 4 million pilgrims during the festival season of Sabarimala temple. The temple is dedicated to the Hindu deity, Ayyappan.

The Cherukolpuzha Hindu convention, Kadammanitta devi temple, the 10th century Kaviyoor mahadeva temple, Parthasarathi temple at Aranmula and anikkattilammakshethram are some of the Hindu religious places of interest.

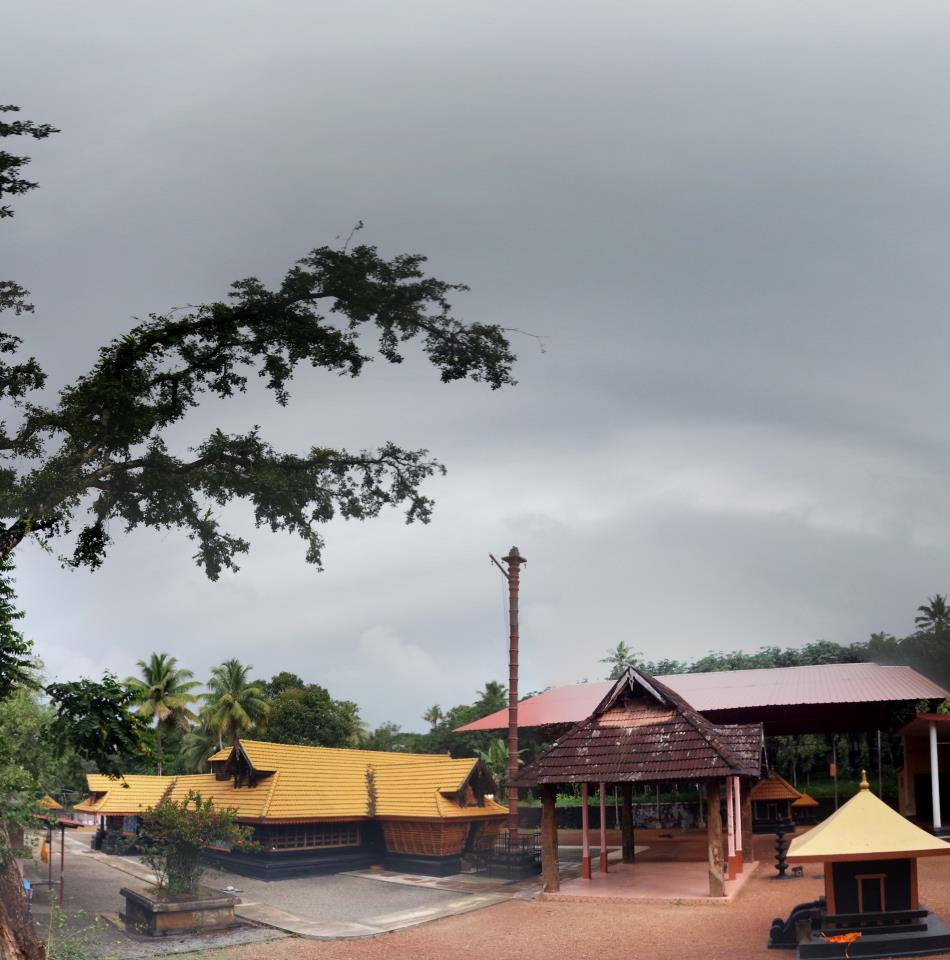
anikkattilammakshethram

Pathanamthitta district has places known for its historical importance. Among them are, ancient Valiyakoickal Temple and Palace at Pandalam, monument of Velu Thampi Dalawa at Mannadi and the Muloor Smarakom (Muloor memorial). Pandalam was the capital of the ancient Travancore kingdom.

The Cherukolpuzha Convention, in Pathanamthitta is an important religious convention of the Hindus. It is held at Cherukole on the sand banks of Pamba River, usually in February every year. It is organized by the Ayroor-Cherukolpuzha Hindumatha Maha Mandalam at Vidyadhiraja Nagar at Ayroor village.

The district is a host to Asia's biggest and the world's second largest Christian convention, the Maramon Convention It is an eight-day Christian gathering in the month of February, conducted by the Malankara Marthoma Syrian Church and dedicated to gospel preaching by renowned Christian missionaries from all over the world, and held at Maramon on the sand-bed of Pamba River. The three-day Christian gathering is held at Makkamkunnu, Pathanamthitta known as Makkamkunnu Convention by Malankara Orthodox Church.

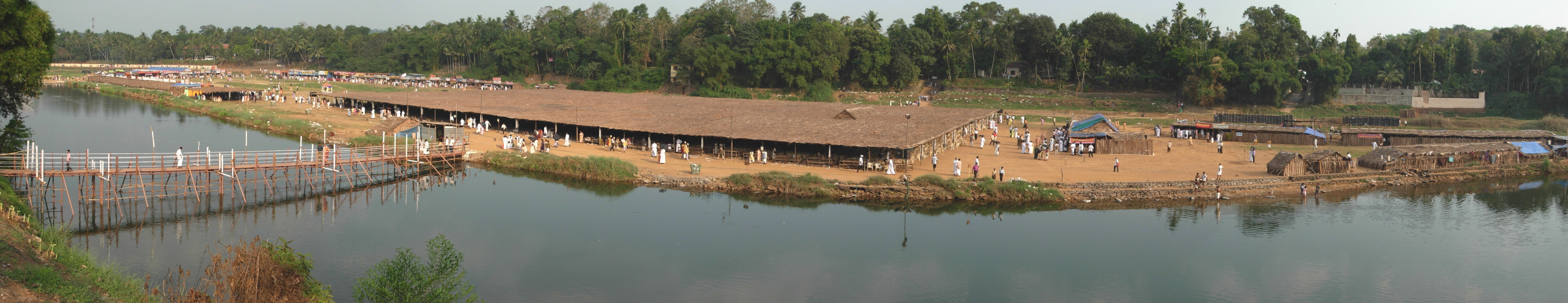
Maramon Convention: Asia's biggest Christian gathering

The most important and famous Christian center is Parumala St Peters, St Paul's and St Gregorios Orthodox Church (http://parumalachurch.org) famous for the tomb of Saint Gregorios (Parumala Thirumeni). Millions of Pilgrims visit this church annually.

St. George Orthodox Church, Chandanapally or Chandanapally Valiyapalli is one of the biggest churches in South India, located at a village named Chandanapally, Pathanamthitta District.

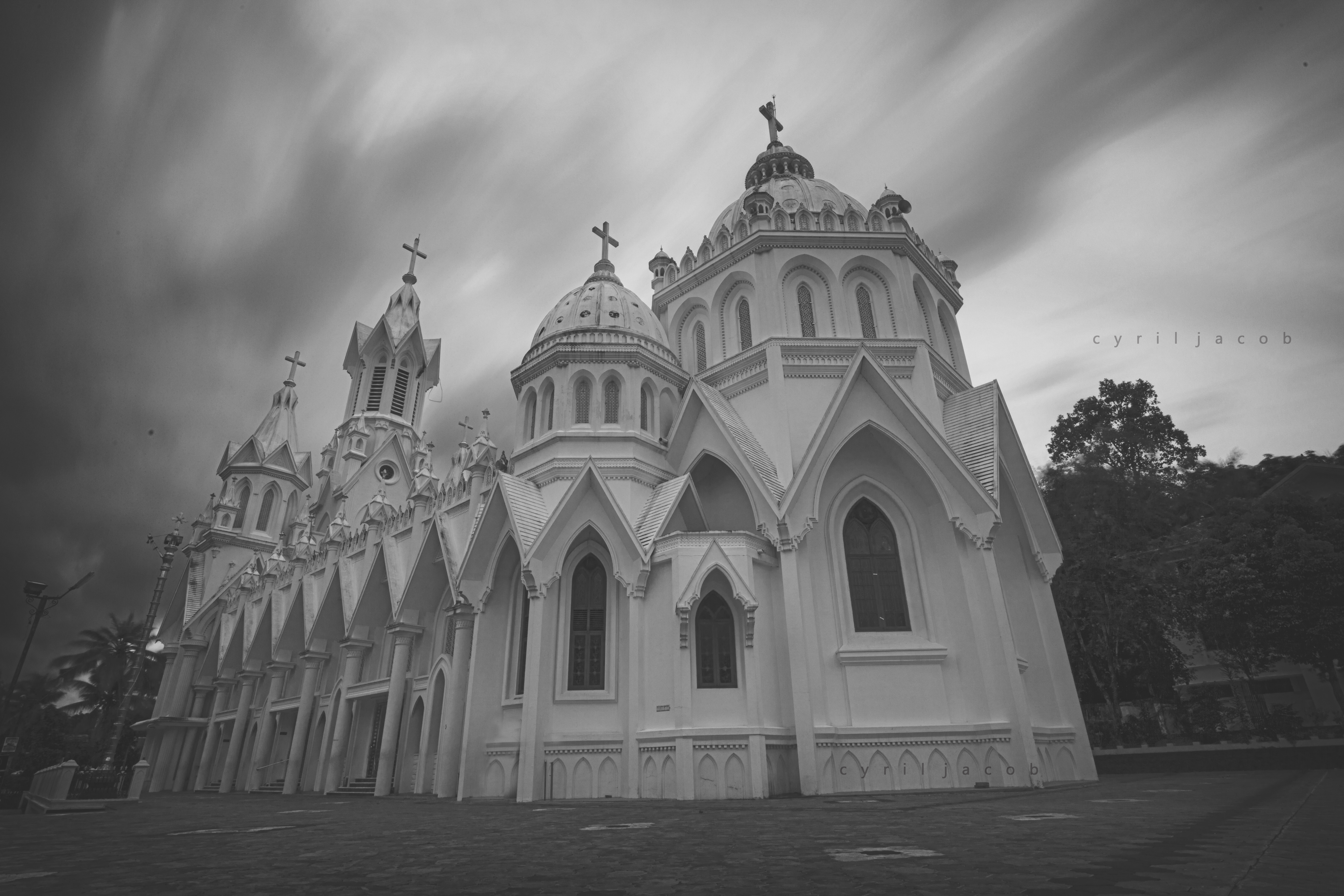
St. George Orthodox Church, Chandanapally or Chandanapally Valiyapalli is one of the biggest churches in South India, located at a village named Chandanapally, Pathanamthitta District in Kerala state of India.

St. George Orthodox Church, Mylapra or Mylapra Valiyapalli or Chakkittayil palli (ചക്കിട്ടേൽ പള്ളി) is one of the famous Georgian pilgrim centre which is very close to Pathanamthitta District headquarters.

St. George Orthodox Church, Mylapra

Some of the other Christian places of interest are St. Mary's Orthodox church at Niranam, St. Thomas Ecumenical Church at Nilackal, the Mor Ignatius Dayro Manjinikkara of the Syriac Orthodox Church of India, St Stephen's Jacobite Church, Parumala Seminary and St. Mary's Orthodox Cathedral, Thumpamon also known as Thumpamon Valiya Pally, headquarters of Thumapmon Diocese of Malankara Orthodox Church. The churches at Niranam and Nilackal (Chayal) are believed to be among the seven churches founded by St. Thomas the Apostle. The Muslim colourful Chandanakkudam festival of the Jama — Al Mosque at Pathanamthitta town attracts many visitors. Although these places are religious in nature, they attract people from all faiths.

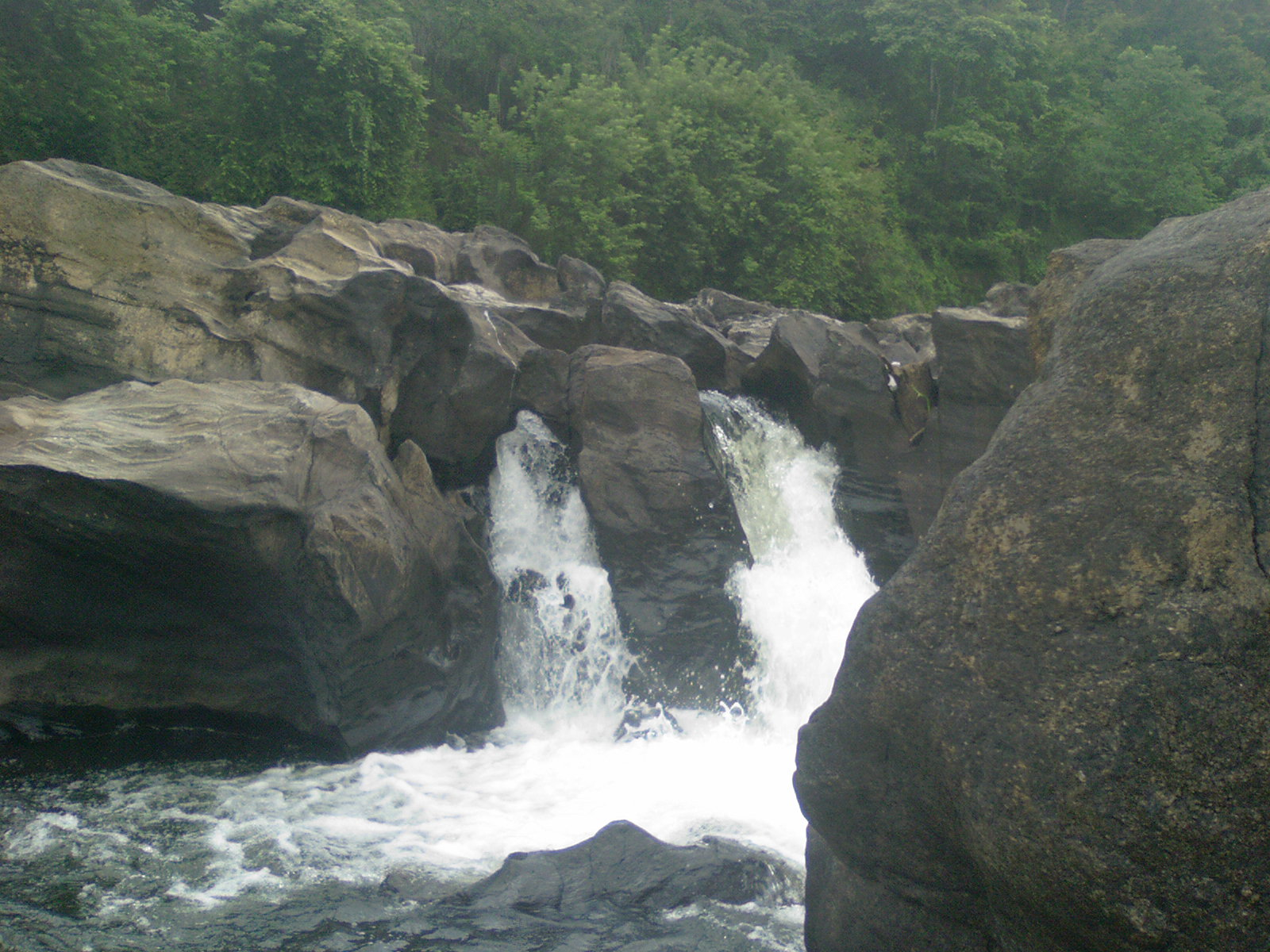
Perunthenaruvi water falls

The Maramon Convention, one of the largest Christian convention in Asia, is held at Maramon, Pathanamthitta, Kerala, India annually during the month of February on the vast sand-bed of the Pampa River next to the Kozhencherry Bridge. It is organised by Mar Thoma Evangelistic Association, the missionary wing of the Mar Thoma Church.

The Church of God (Full Gospel) in India, Kerala State, holds its annual convention in Tiruvalla town center. This is usually held in the month of January and is a large gathering of Pentecostal Christians.

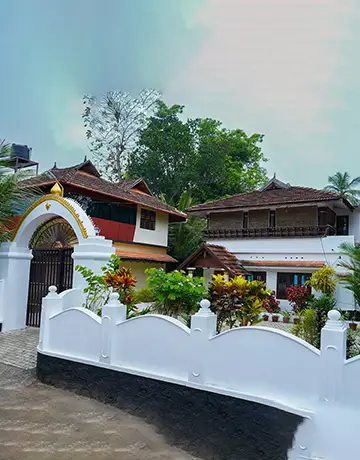
Aranmula Palace

The district has other tourist attractions. Aranmula is a major attraction for its famous metal mirrors and snake boat race. The school of traditional arts attracts foreign visitors. Founded by French artist Louba Schild, the school teaches kathakali, classical dance, classical music as well as kalarippayattu. The palace at Aranmula Aranmula Palace has a history of 100 years.

The district is known for its reserve forest and wild life. Perunthenaruvi water falls, Kakki reservoir surrounded by forest and wild animals, dam sites at Moozhyar and Maniyar, elephant training centre at Konni, Charalkunnu hill station are ideal locations for nature enthusiasts. Trekking to the Sabari Hills during January to March is also organized by Pathanamthitta District Tourism Promotion Councils (DTPC).

== Flora and fauna ==
The forests of the district have excellent wild life habitats. A variety of animals and birds can be found. Tigers, elephants, gaur, deer, monkeys and other wild animals are found in the forest. Giant squirrel, lion-tailed macaques, barking deer and bear can also be spotted in the reserve. Malabar grey hornbill and great Indian hornbill are found. Wide variety of other birds such as sunbirds, woodpeckers and kingfishers can also be seen.

The existence of the wildlife habitat is under threat from various areas. Pollution from fertilizer and industries and illegal sand mining are the major threats. Issues connected to Sabarimala pilgrimage such as clearing of forest land and large amount of waste discharged also threatens the habitat.

== Sports ==
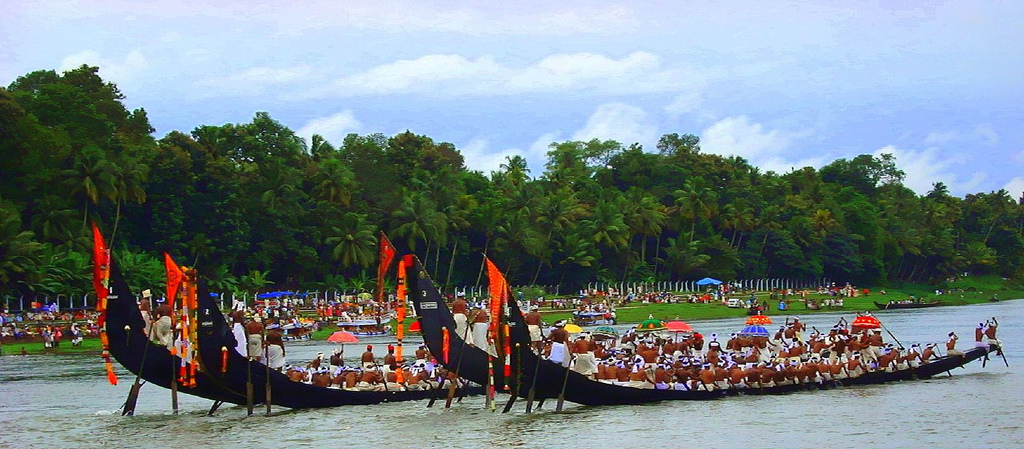
Aranmula Uthrattathi Boat Race

The Aranmula Boat Race is part of a festival celebrated during the month of September. Though the snake boat race is also performed at nearby places, the race held at Aranmula is unique because of the boats' shape and design. Maramadimatsaram (Ox Race) is another such seasonal sport. This is held as part of the largest annual cattle fair of Central Travancore region. The race is held in three categories.

== Notable people ==
- Thomas Athanasius
- Fathima Beevi
- Benyamin
- Adoor Bhasi
- Adoor Bhavani
- Blessy
- Baselios Cleemis
- Kuriakose Clemis
- Baselios Marthoma Didymos I
- K. G. George
- T. J. S. George
- Adoor Gopalakrishnan
- P. K. Gopi
- Geevarghese Ivanios
- Meera Jasmine
- Parvathy Jayaram
- S. Jithesh
- Kailash
- K. Kumar
- Vennikkulam Gopala Kurup
- C. J. Kuttappan
- P. K. Manthri
- Mohanlal
- George Alexander Muthoot
- Mathai George Muthoot
- Mythili
- K. K. Nair
- Nayanthara
- Muloor S. Padmanabha Panicker
- Adoor Pankajam
- Kadammanitta Vasudevan Pillai
- Rajeev Pillai
- Aranmula Ponnamma
- Kaviyoor Ponnamma
- Adoor Prakash
- Prathapachandran
- C. K. Ra
- Captain Raju
- Kadammanitta Ramakrishnan
- V. C. Samuel
- K. V. Simon
- Sidhartha Siva
- Kaviyoor Sivaprasad
- M. G. Soman
- Sugathakumari
- Pandalam Sudhakaran
- Thilakan
- Abraham Mar Thoma
- Alexander Mar Thoma
- Joseph Mar Thoma
- Juhanon Mar Thoma
- Philipose Mar Chrysostom Mar Thoma
- Mathew T. Thomas
- Urmila Unni
- B. Unnikrishnan
- Sadhu Kochoonju Upadesi
- V. S. Valiathan
- Aju Varghese
- George Varghese
- Pandalam Kerala Varma
- Samyuktha Varma
- Nitya Chaitanya Yati
- Poykayil Yohannan
- Militos Yuhanon

== See also ==
- List of people from Pathanamthitta district
- Alappuzha district
- Idukki district
- Kottayam district
- Kollam district
