= Sabarimala (place) =

- Hill
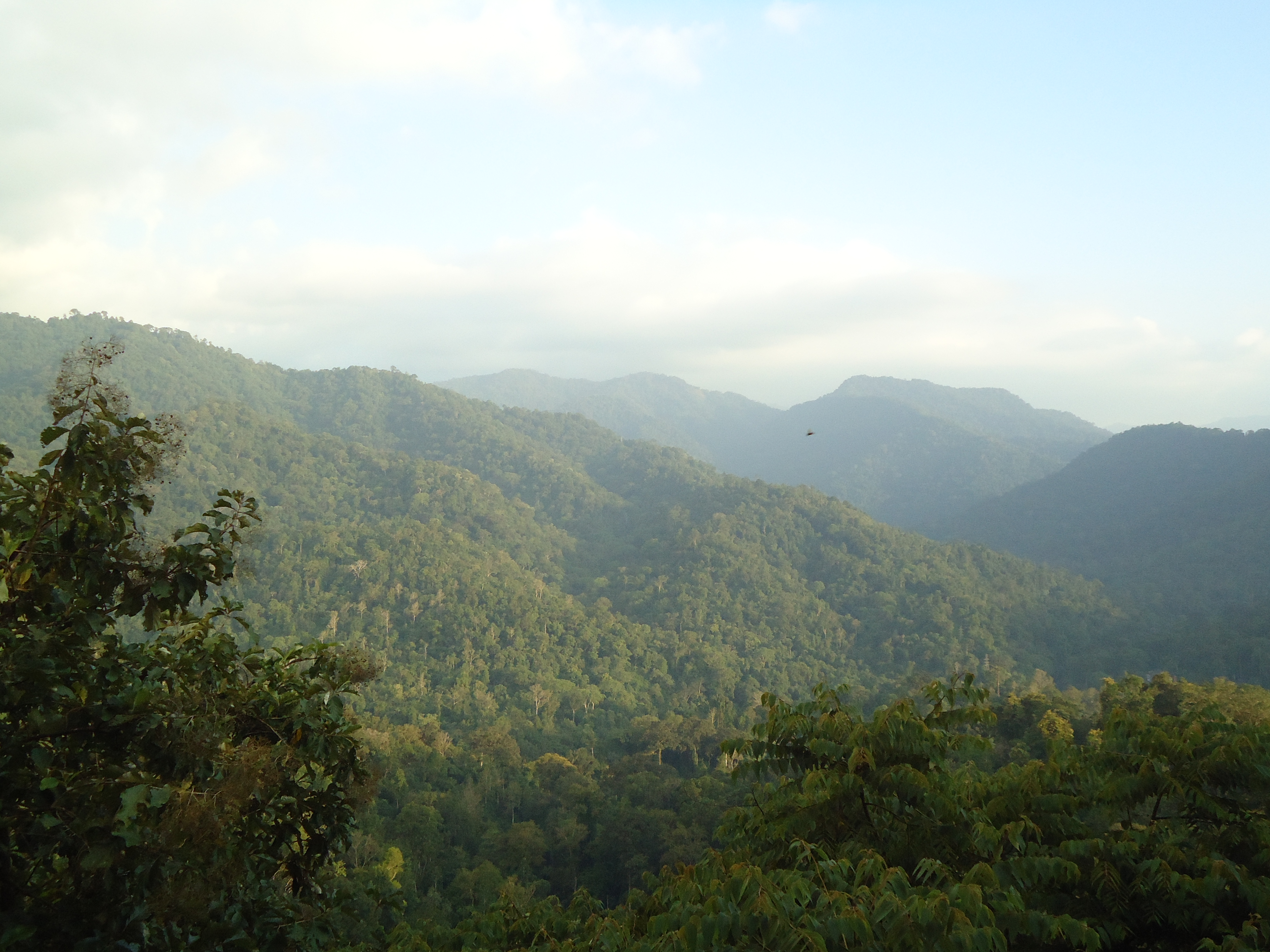

- Location within Kerala
- Coordinates: 9.4375°N 77.0805°E
- Country: India
- State: Kerala
- District: Pathanamthitta
- Elevation: 1,260 m (4,130 ft)

Languages
- Time zone: UTC+5:30 (IST)
- Telephone code: 0473
- Vehicle registration: KL-03, KL-62
- Website: www.sabarimala.kerala.gov.in

Sabarimala is a hill situated in Perunad village, Ranni Taluk, Thiruvalla Revenue Division of Pathanamthitta district in Kerala State. This hill is situated at 72 kilometers from Pathanamthitta town. The distance from Ranni to Sabarimala is 60 kilometers. A motorable road is built from Ranni to Pampa, valley of Sabarimala hills. Sabarimala Sree Dharmasastha Temple, Malikappuram Temple are situated on one side of this hills. Sabarimala is located inside Periyar National Park in the Western Ghats (Sahyadris). The height of Sabarimala from mean sea level is 1,260 meters.

An ascetic woman named Shabari, also known as Sabari from Ramayana, was believed to have lived in this region. She devoted herself to rigorous penance with the sole purpose of meeting Lord Rama. Her opportunity came when Rama, while searching for Sita devi, visited her humble abode. This significant encounter led to the mountain being named "Sabarimala," which translates to "the mountain or hill of Sabari," honoring the old devotee.

== Gallery ==
=== View of Hills ===
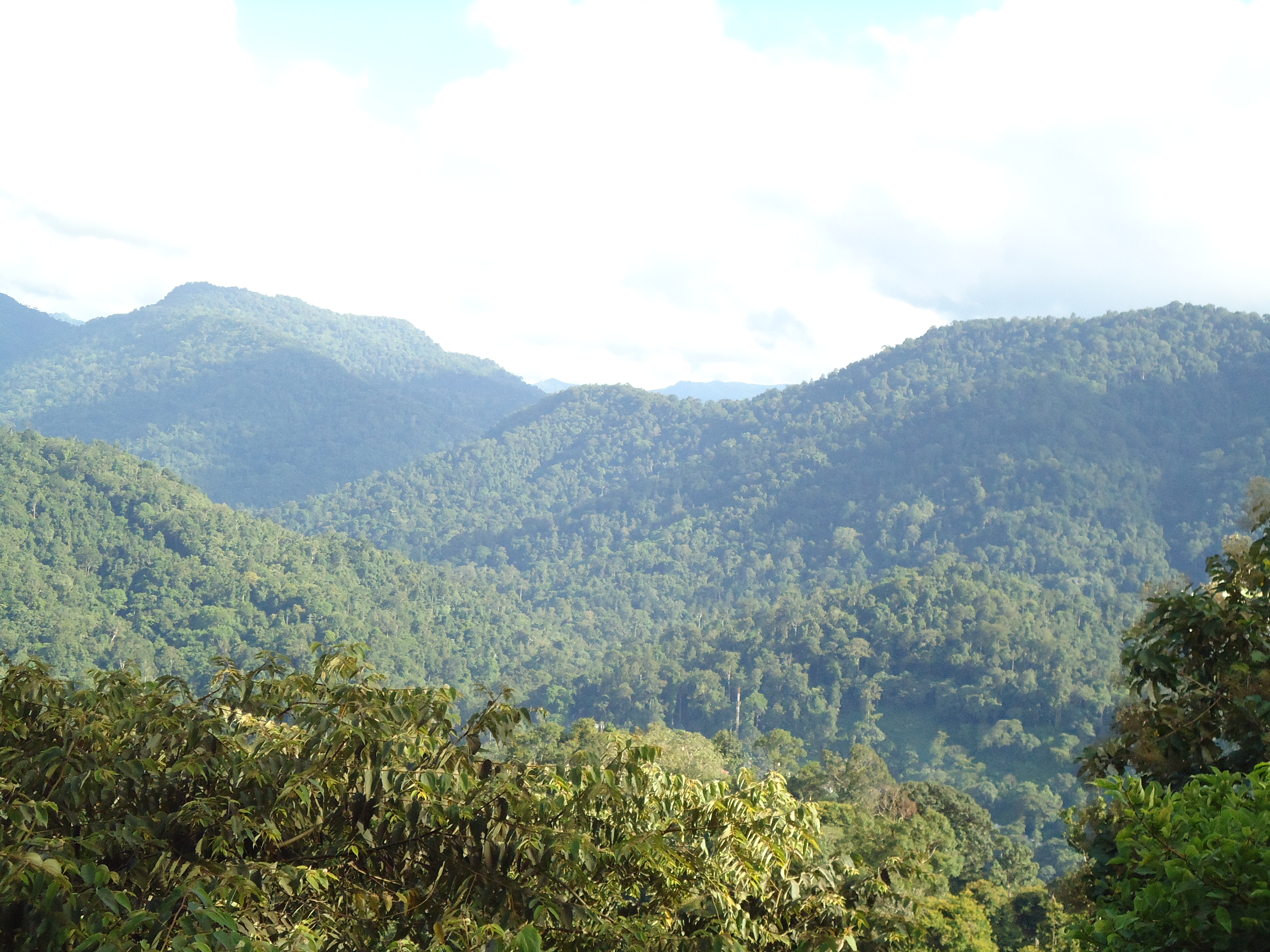

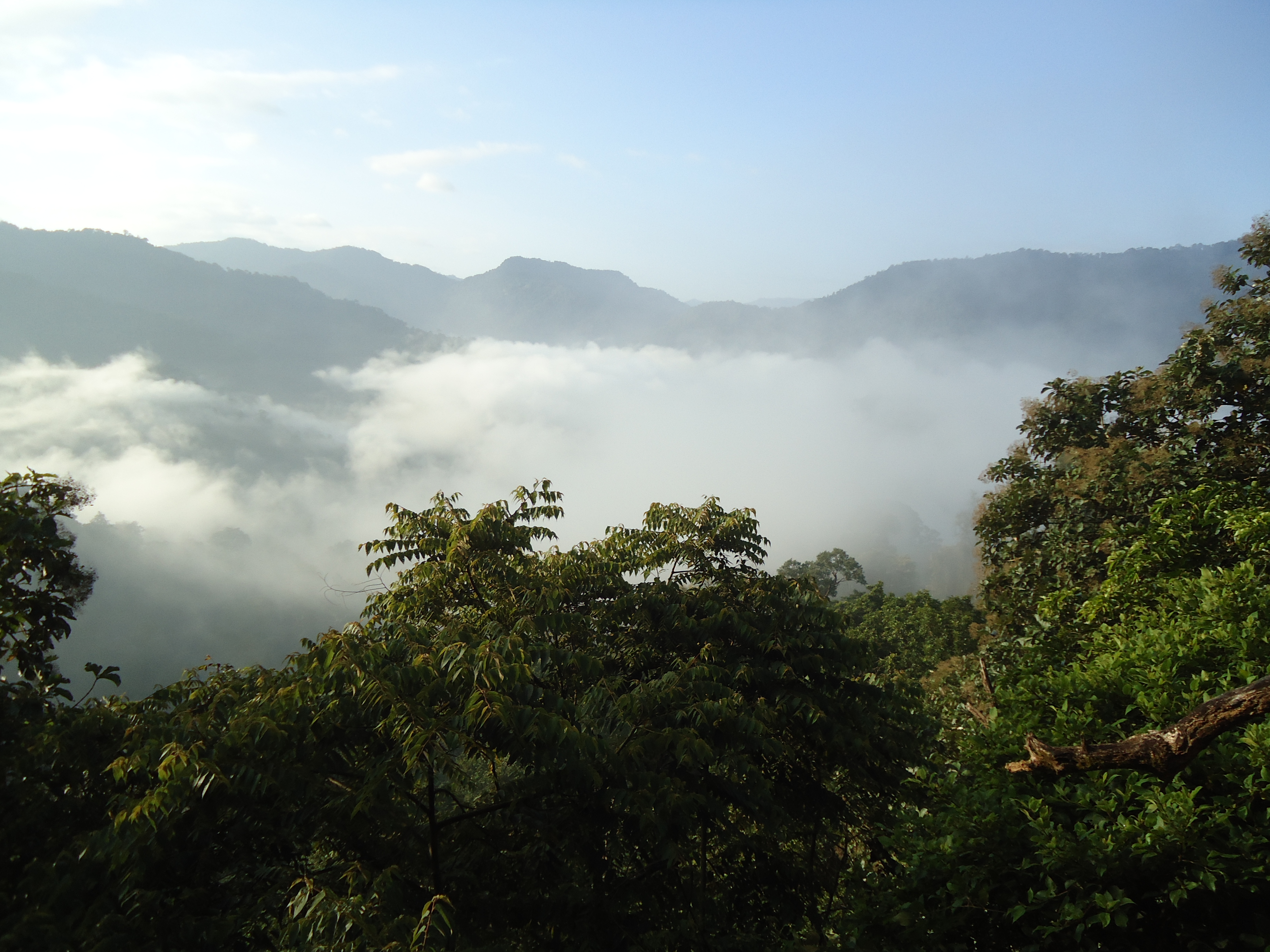

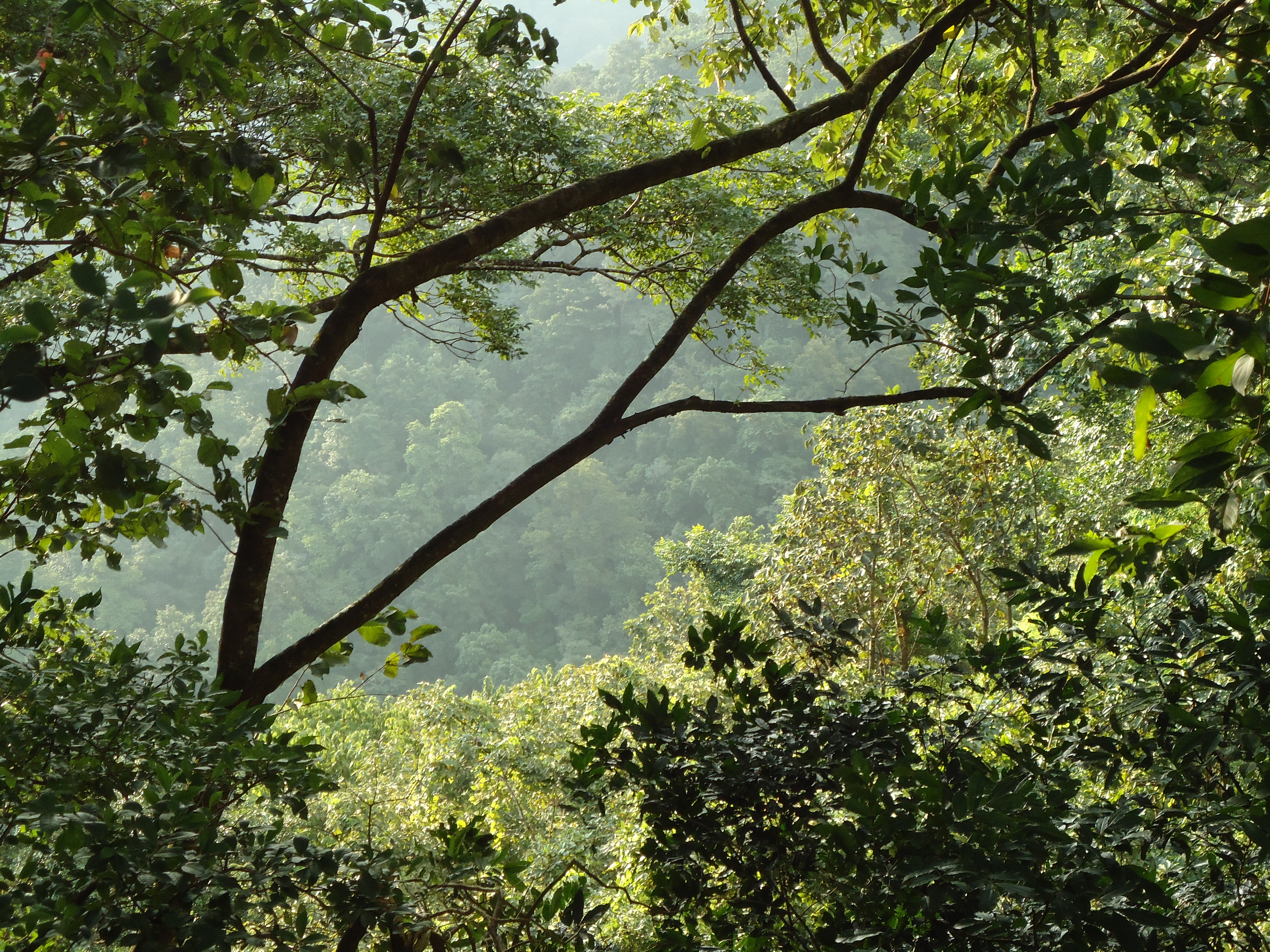

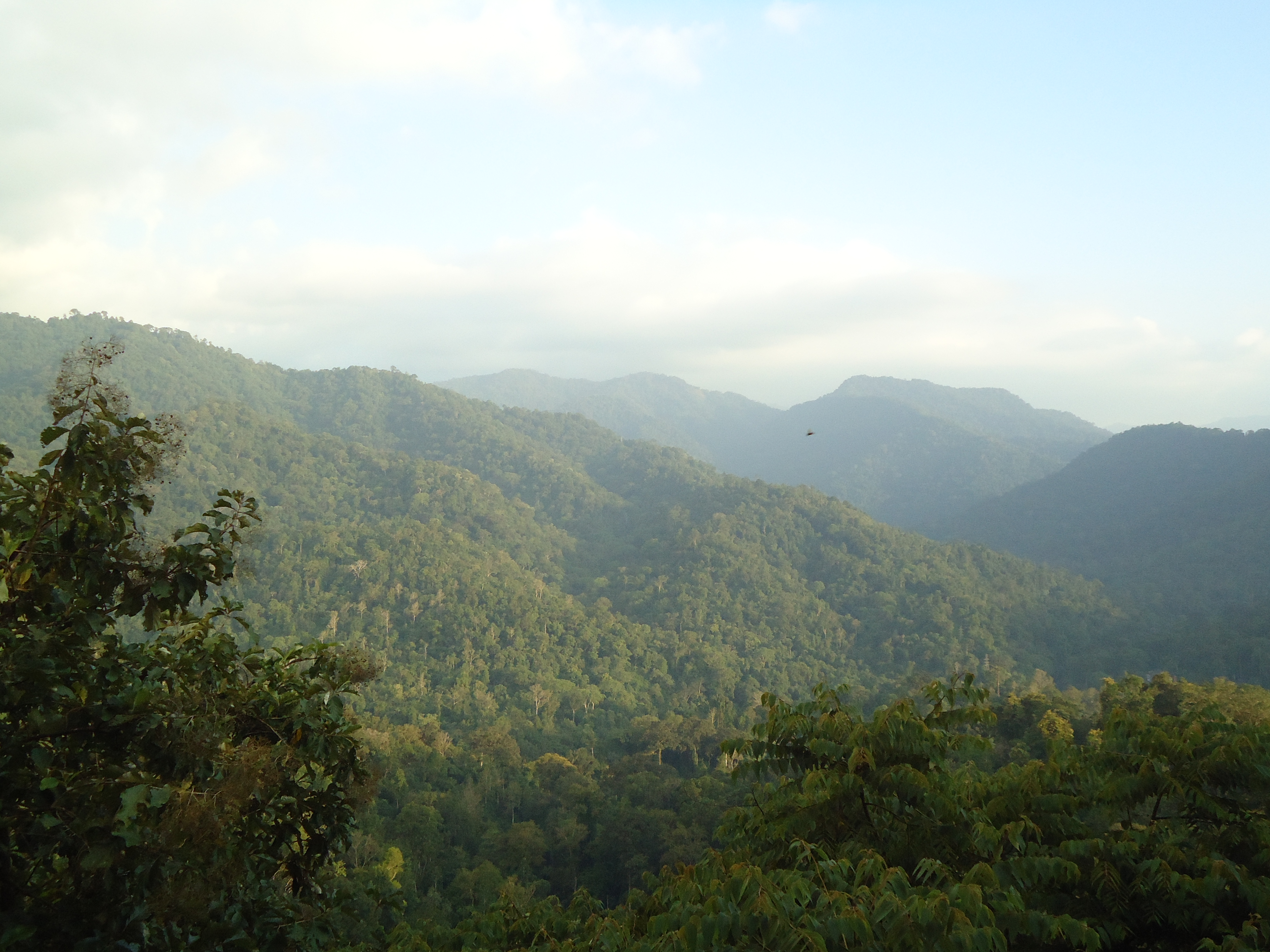

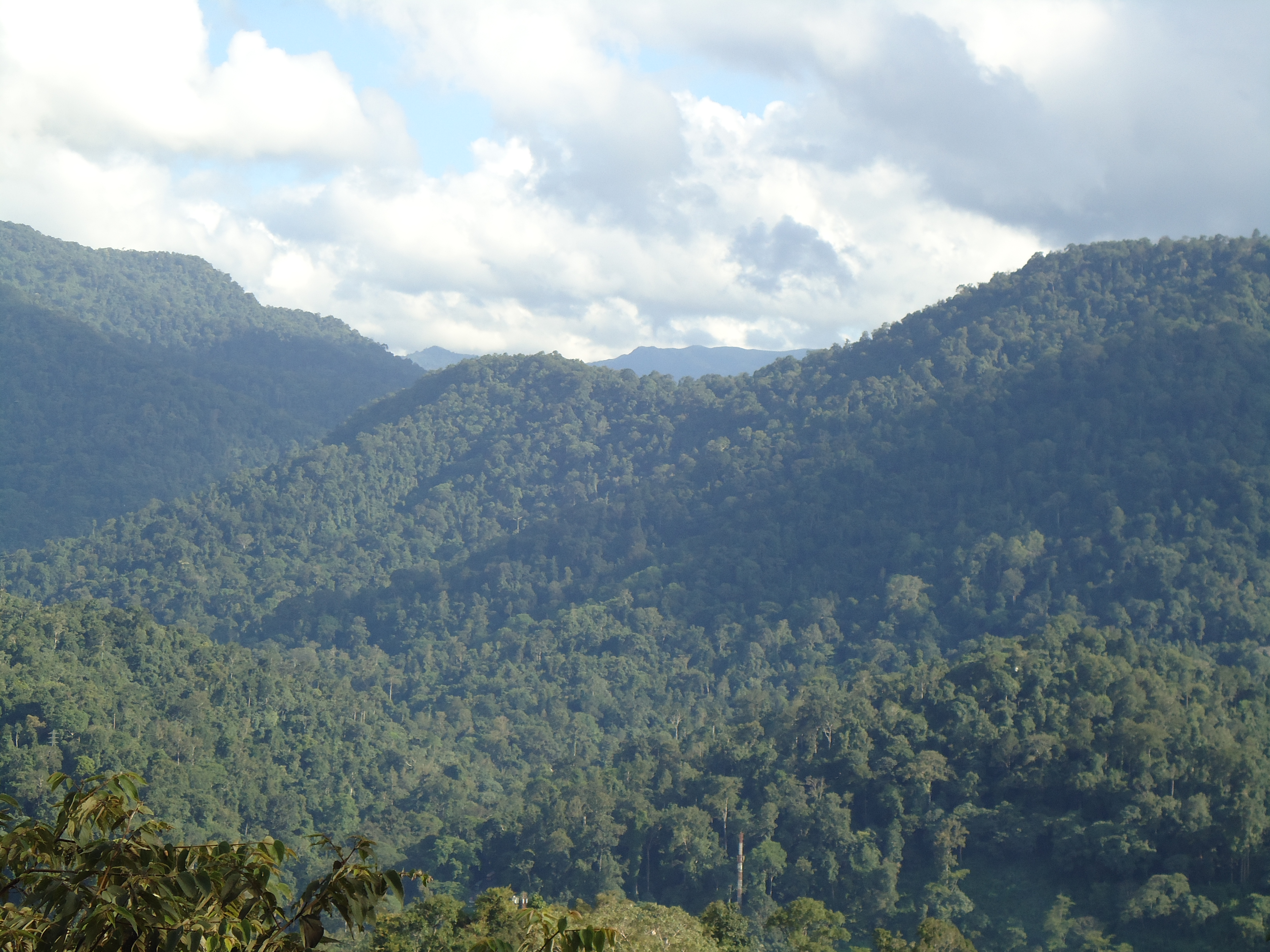

=== Flora of Sabarimala hills ===
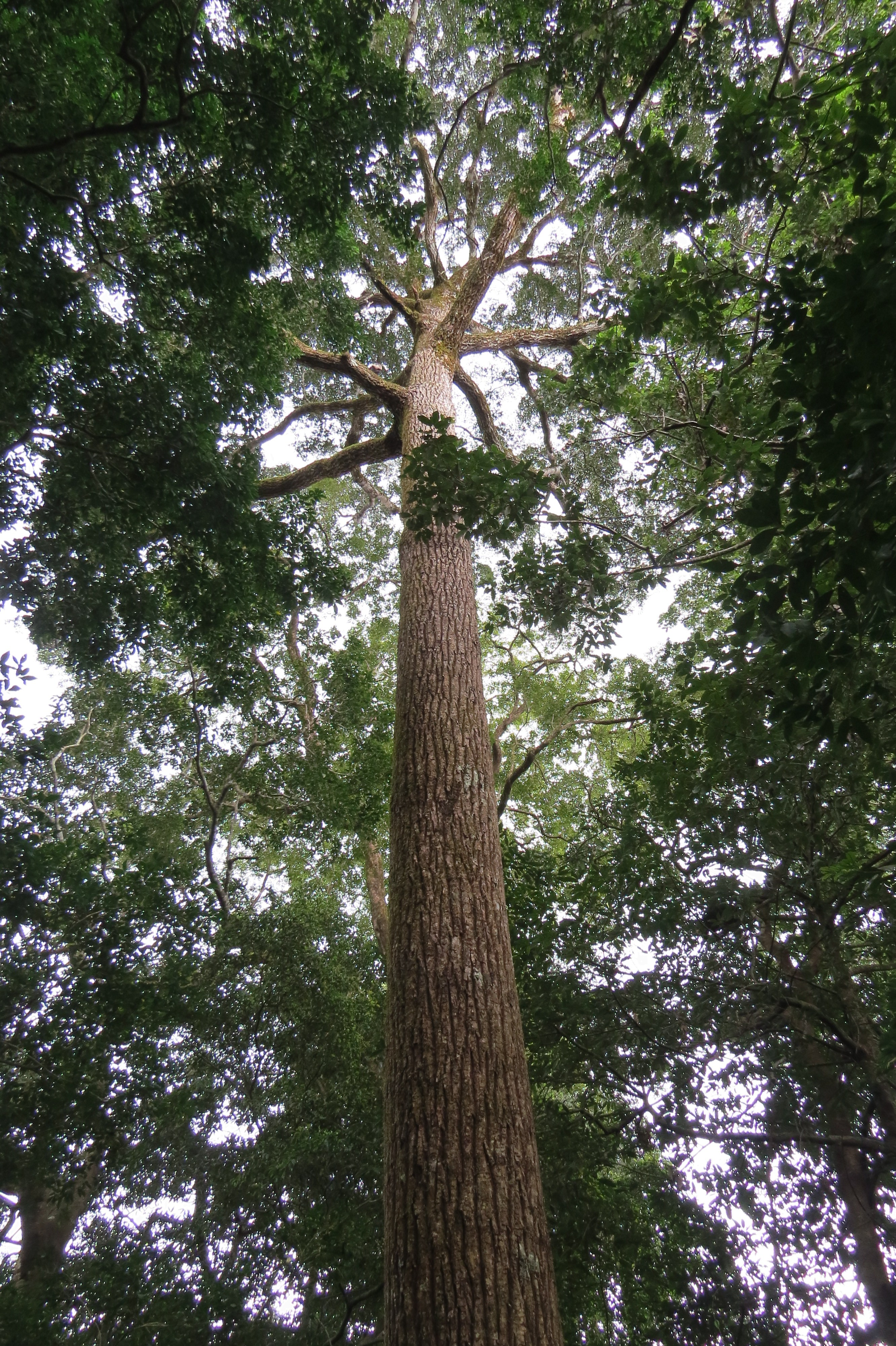

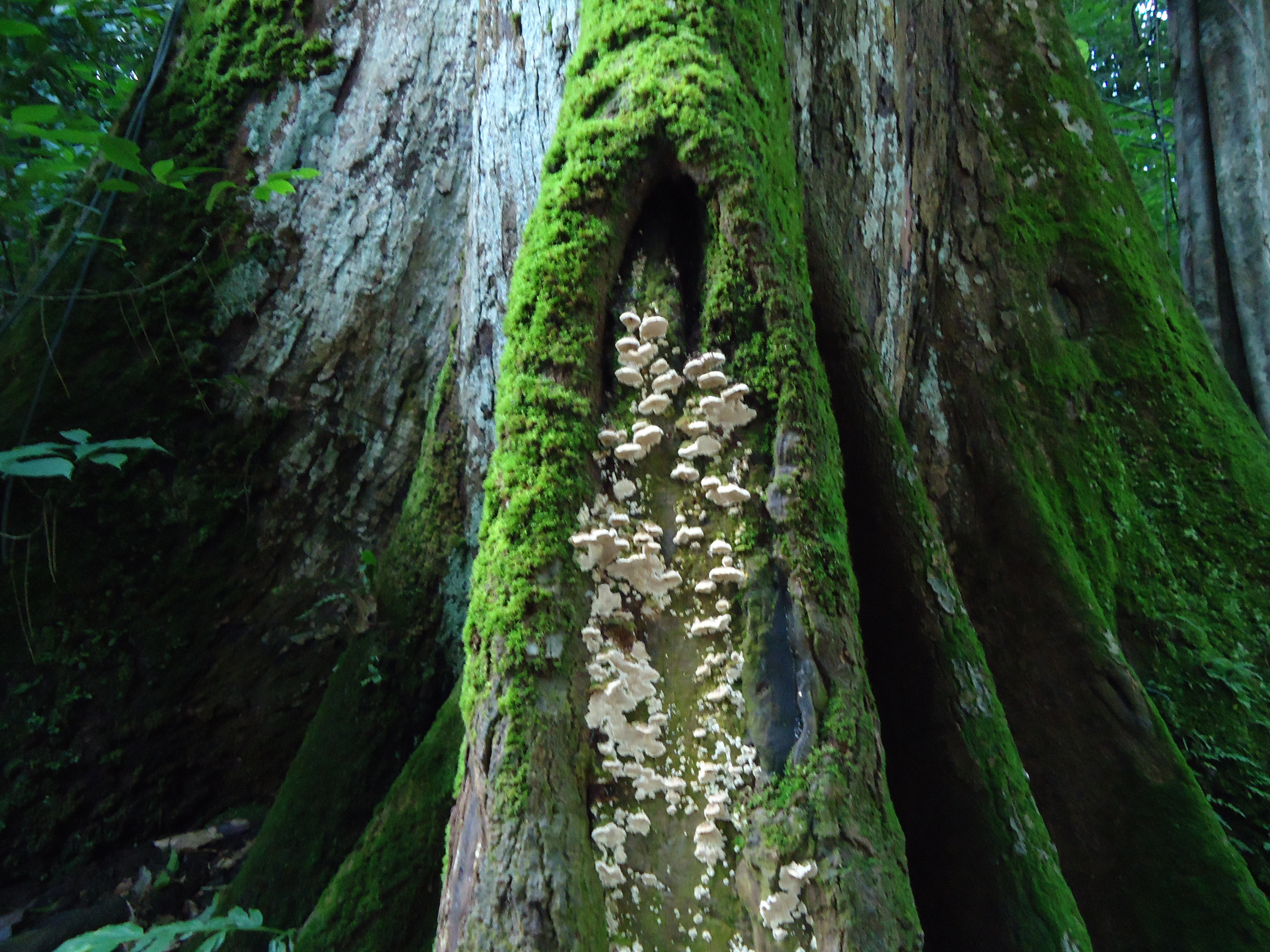

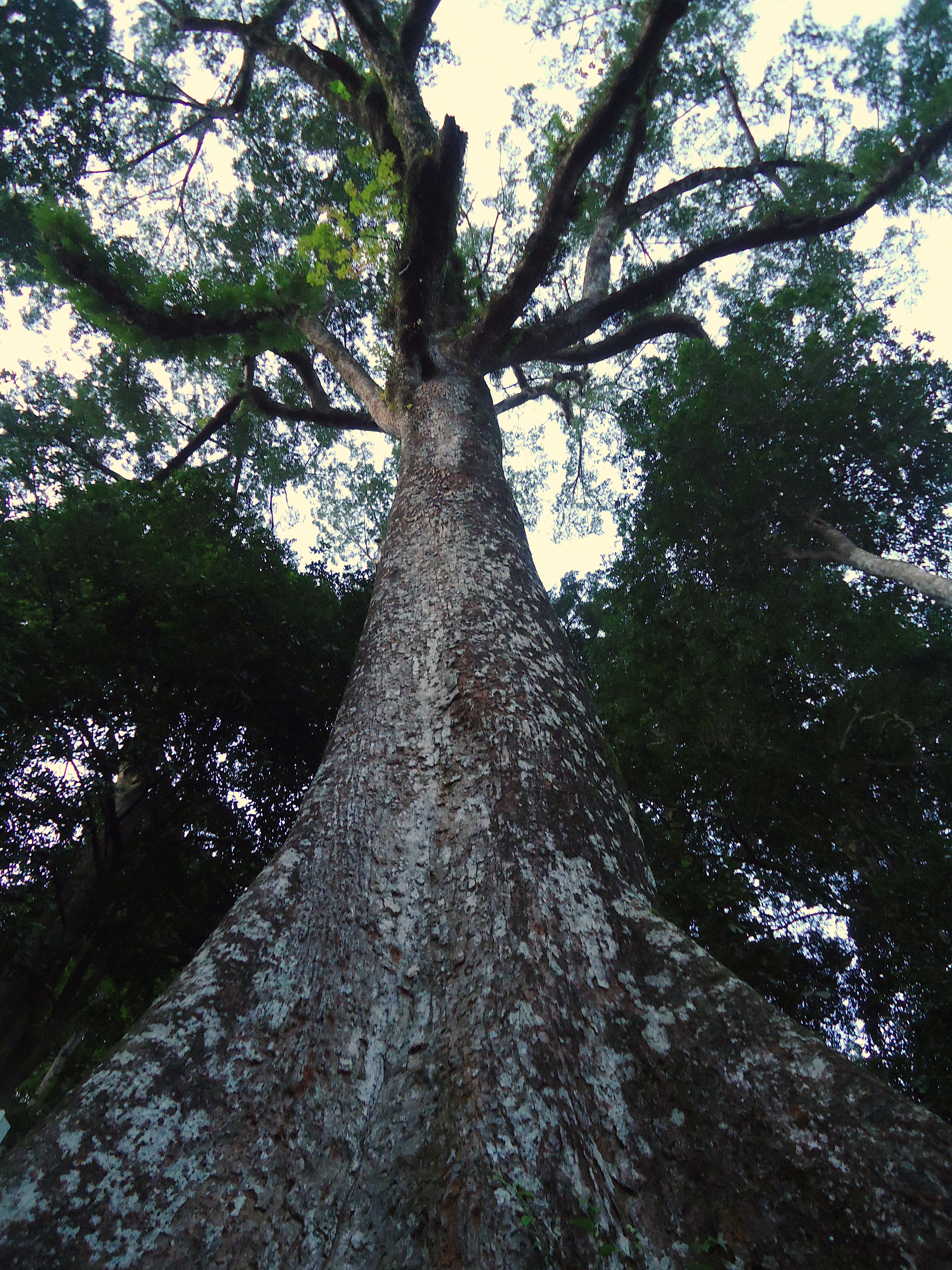

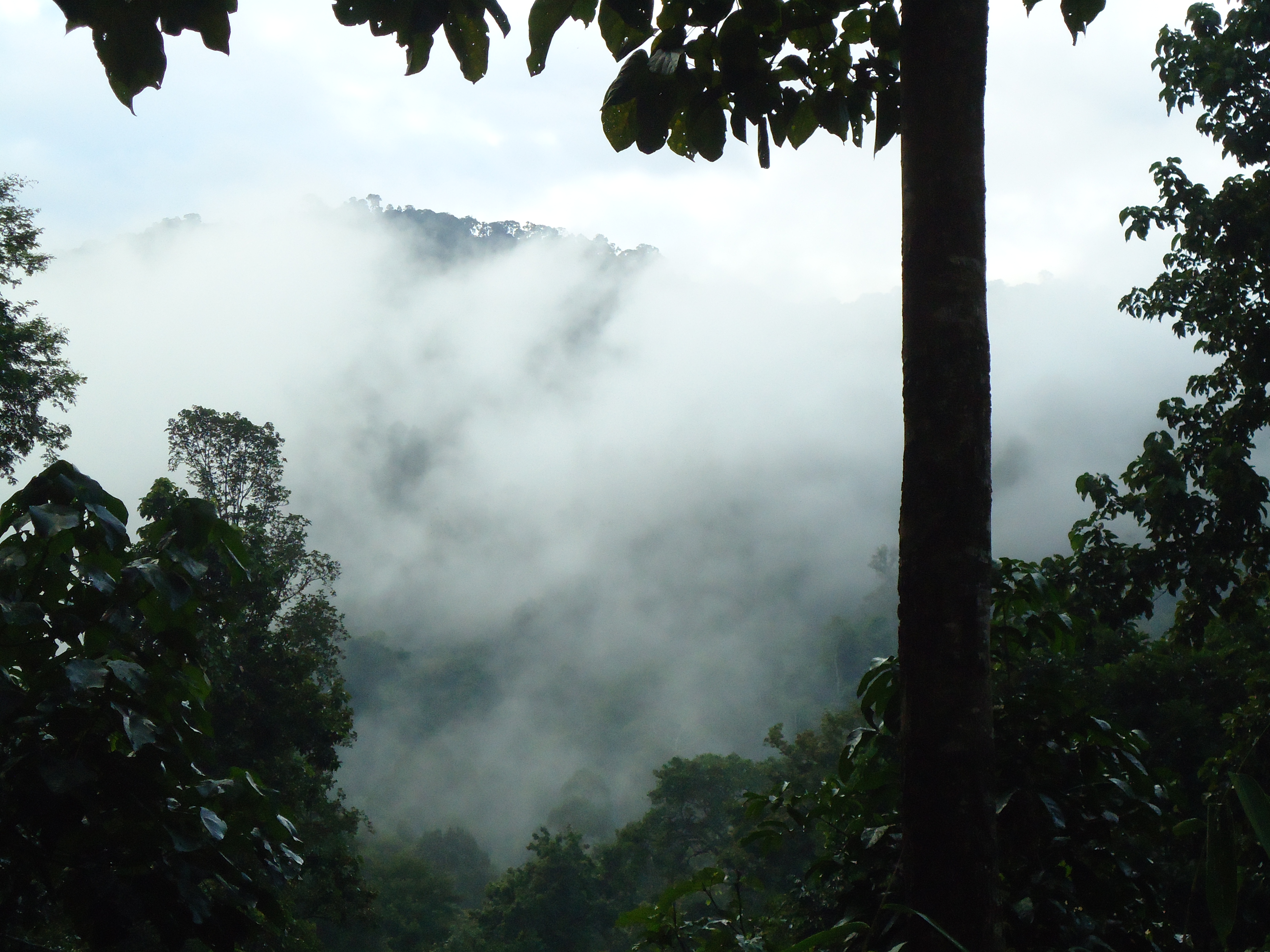

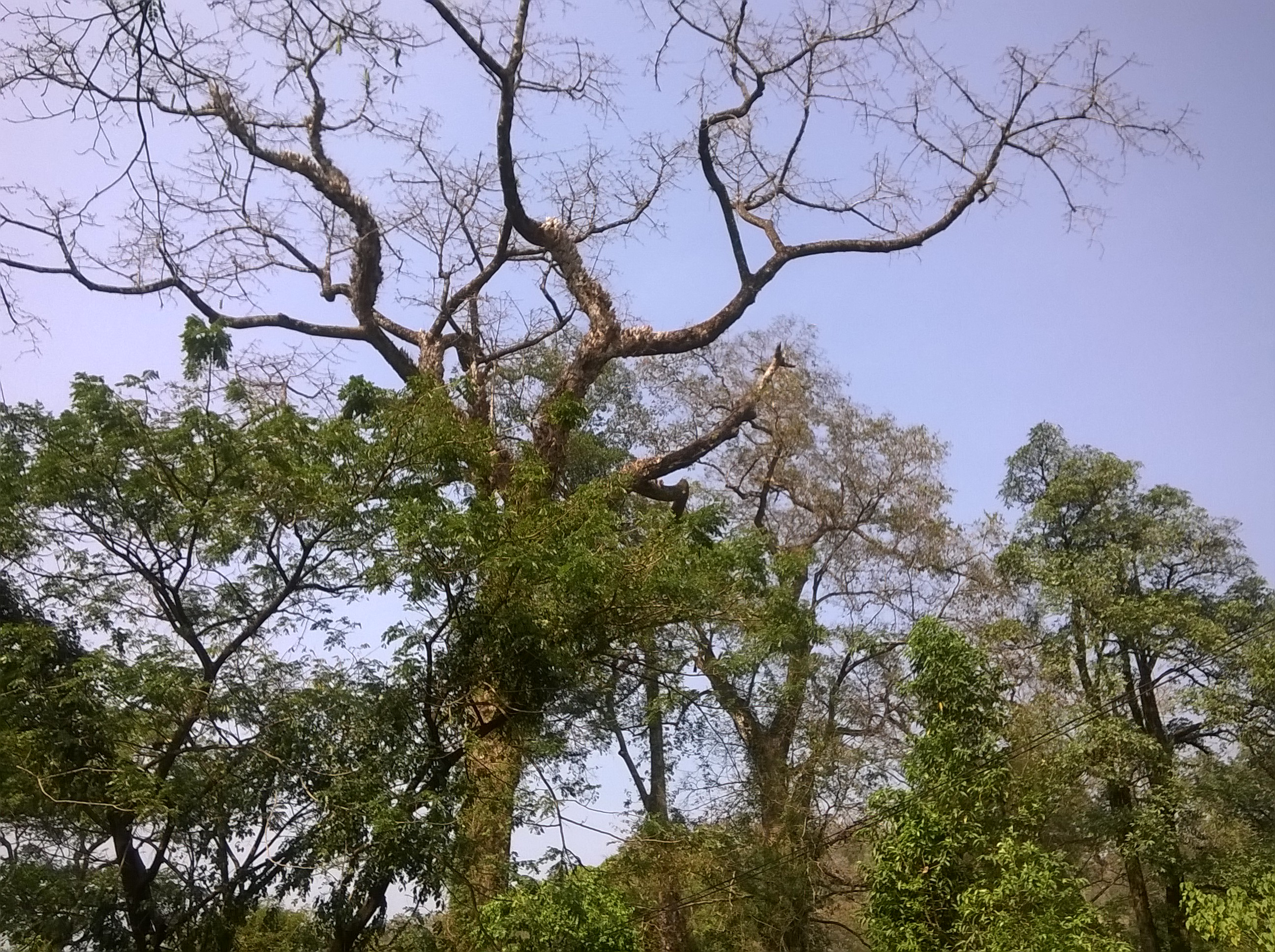

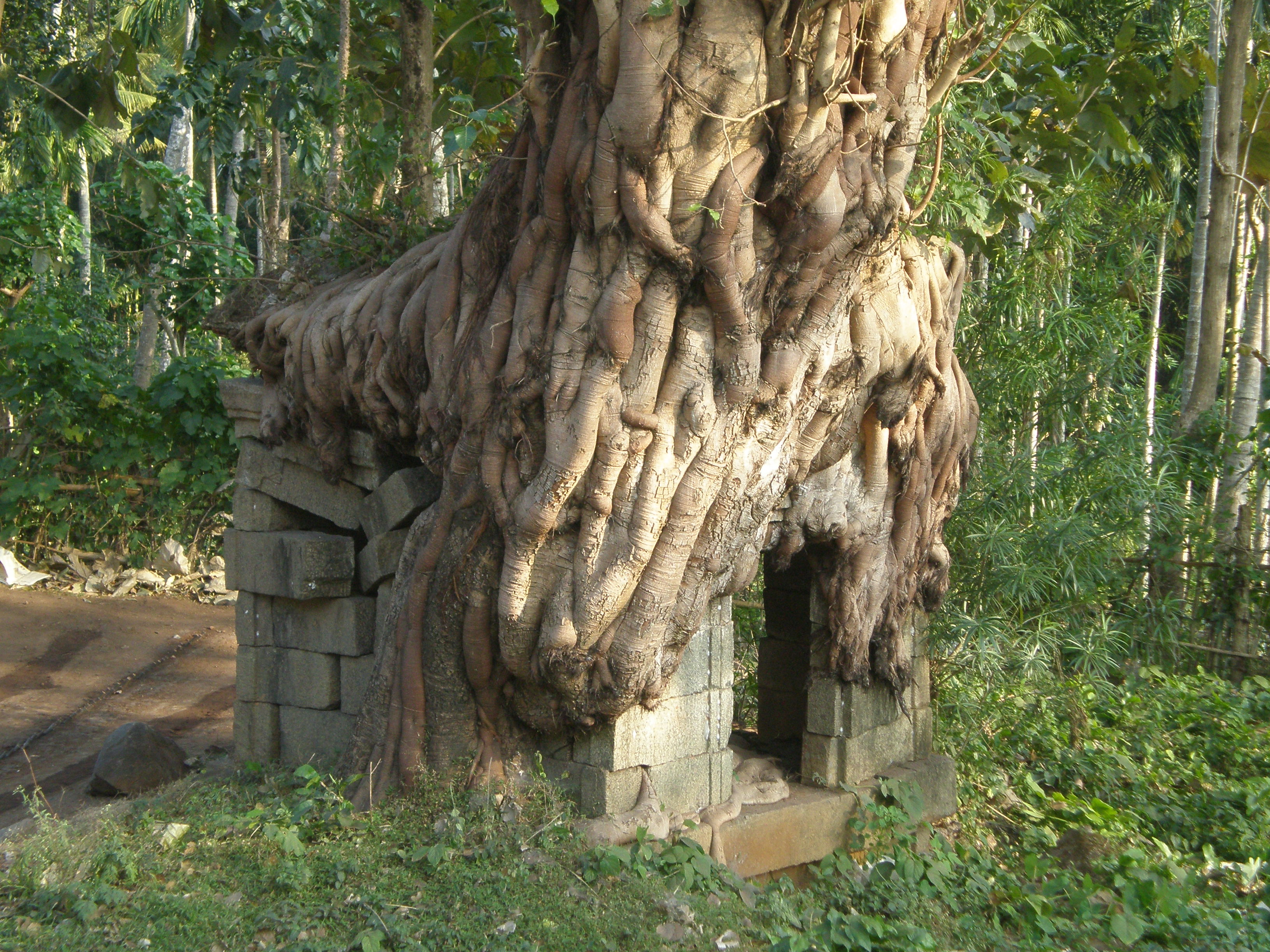
