= Administration of Pathanamthitta district =

The Pathanamthitta district has four types of administrative hierarchies:

- Taluk and Village administration managed by the provincial government of Kerala
- Panchayath Administration managed by the local bodies
- Parliament Constituencies for the federal government of India
- Assembly Constituencies for the provincial government of Kerala

== Electoral Administration ==
As per the Delimitation of Parliamentary and Assembly Constituencies Order, 2008, Pathanamthitta has five Assembly constituencies, down from eight. However, the district was unified into a single Parliamentary constituency, thus contributing a seat to the Lok Sabha. The Pathanamthitta parliamentary constituency is formed by including all the five Assembly constituencies of the district along with two other Assembly constituencies in the neighboring Kottayam district. Congress, BJP, Kerala Congress, and the CPM/CPI are the main political parties.

== Revenue Administration ==
The district headquarters is at Pathanamthitta town. The district administration is headed by the District Collector. He is assisted by five Deputy Collectors holding charges of general matters, revenue recovery, land acquisition, land reforms and election.

Pathanamthitta district is divided into two revenue divisions and six taluks.

The taluks again are divided into villages. Villages are the lowest level of subdivisions in India. Pathanamthitta has a total of 70 villages.

Adoor Revenue Division:

- Adoor Taluk
- Konni Taluk
- Kozhencherry Taluk

Thiruvalla Revenue Division:

- Ranni Taluk
- Mallapally Taluk
- Thiruvalla Taluk

=== Adoor Taluk ===
Headquarters: Adoor. No. Of Villages: 14.

Villages: Enadimangalam, Kodumon, Angadickal, Ezhamkulam, Enathu, Erathu, Adoor, Peringanad, Pallikkal, Kadampanad, Pandalam Thekkekara, Thumpamon, Kurampala, Pandalam

=== Konni Taluk ===
Headquarters: Konni. No. Of Villages: 14.

Villages: Kalanjoor, Koodal, Mylapra, Malayalapuzha, Vallicode, Vallicode-Kottayam, Pramadom, Konni, Konni-Thazham, Iravon, Aruvappulam, Thannithodu, Seethathodu, Chittar

=== Kozhencherry Taluk ===
Headquarters: Pathanamthitta. No. Of Villages: 11

Villages: Kulanada, Mezhuveli, Kidangannoor, Aranmula, Mallappuzhassery, Kozhencherry, Naranganam, Elanthoor, Chenneerkara, Omalloor, Pathanamthitta

=== Ranni Taluk ===
Headquarters: Ranni. No. Of Villages: 10

Villages: Vadasserikkara, Ranni-Perunad, Athikkayam, Kollamula, Chethakkal, Ranni-Pazhavangadi, Ranni-Angadi, Ranni, Cherukole, Ayroor

=== Mallapally Taluk ===
Headquarters: Mallapally. No. Of Villages: 9

Villages: Kottangal, Perumpetty, Ezhumattoor, Thelliyoor, Puramattam, Anicadu, Kallooppara, Mallappally, Kunnamthanam

=== Thiruvalla Taluk ===
Headquarters: Thiruvalla. No. Of Villages: 12

Villages: Kaviyoor, Kuttoor, Eraviperoor, Koipuram, Thottapuzhassery, Kuttappuzha, Thiruvalla, Kavumbhagam, Peringara, Nedumpuram, Kadapra, Niranam

== Civic Administration ==
Under the three tier system of panchayat in rural areas, Pathanamthitta has one district panchayat, 9 block panchayat and 57 grama panchayats.

Under the single tier system in urban areas, there are 4 municipalities the district. In addition, there is a census town (Kozhencherry).

=== Municipalities ===
1. Thiruvalla
2. Pathanamthitta
3. Adoor
4. Pandalam
