= Malankara Orthodox Diocese of Niranam =

Diocese of the Malankara Orthodox Syrian Church in India

Diocese of Niranam

Orthodox
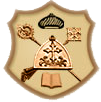
- Catholicate Emblem

Location
- Country: India
- Territory: Niranam
- Metropolitan: H. G. Yuhanon Mar Chrysostamos
- Headquarters: Bethany Aramana, Thiruvalla, Kerala – 689 101

Information
- First holder: Gregorios of Parumala
- Rite: Malankara Rite
- Established: 1876, by Ignatius Peter IV
- Diocese: Niranam Diocese
- Parent church: Malankara Orthodox Syrian Church

Website
- Niranam Diocese

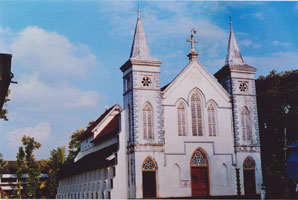
St. Mary's Orthodox Church, Niranam

The Diocese of Niranam is one of the 32 diocese of the Malankara Orthodox Syrian Church located at Niranam, Kerala, India.

== History ==
The Diocese of Niranam is created in 1876 with 22 parishes. The first Metropolitan of the diocese was Parumala Mar Gregorios who was later declared by the Holy Synod in 1947 as the saint of the church. Parumala Seminary was the first Diocesan Headquarters.

Today there are 76 parishes and 6 chapels in the diocese. St. Mary's Orthodox Church, Niranam popularly known as Niranam Valiyapally, which is believed to be established by St. Thomas the Apostle in AD 54 is a parish under the Niranam diocese. The diocese controls Karunagiri M.G.D Ashram, Balabhavan, Thiruvalla Marthamariam Mandiram Hostel and Aged Home.

The diocesan headquarters is at Bethany Aramana, Thiruvalla. In 2023, the present Metropolitan is Dr. Yuhanon Mar Crysostomos.

== Diocesan Metropolitan ==
Niranam Orthodox Diocesan Metropolitan
From	Until	Metropolitan	Notes
10-Dec-1876	02-Nov-1902	Saint Gregorios of Parumala	Saint of the church and first Indian origin to declared as Saint, entombed at Parumala Church
02-Nov-1902	11-Jul-1909	Pulikkottil Joseph Mar Dionysious II	Malankara Metropolitan, entombed at Pazhaya Seminary, Kottayam
11-Jul-1909	1912	Geevarghese Mar Dionysius of Vattasseril	Malankara Metropolitan, entombed at Pazhaya Seminary, Kottayam
1912	1933	Geevarghese Mar Gregorios	Later Catholicos of the East and Malankara Metropolitan, entombed at Aramana Chapel, Devalokam
1933	1937	Joseph Mar Severios, Valakkuzhiyil	Joined Syro Malankara Catholic Church in 1937
1937	1940	Baselios Geevarghese II	Catholicos of the East and Malankara Metropolitan, entombed at Aramana Chapel, Devalokam
1940	1972	Thoma Mar Dionysius	Entombed at Mount Tabor Dayara, Pathanapuram
1972	1975	Baselios Augen I	Catholicos of the East and Malankara Metropolitan, entombed at Aramana Chapel, Devalokam
1975	1976	Baselios Mar Thoma Mathews I	Catholicos of the East and Malankara Metropolitan, entombed at Aramana Chapel, Devalokam
1976	2007	Geevarghese Mar Osthathios	Entombed at St. Paul's Mission Chapel, Mavelikkara
2007	Present	Yuhanon Mar Chrysostamos	10th Metropolitan of the diocese

Assistant Metropolitan
From	Until	Metropolitan	Notes
1972	1975	Mathews Mar Athanasius	Assistant metropolitan
2005	2007	Yuhanon Mar Chrysostamos	Assistant metropolitan

== List of Parishes ==
- St. George Orthodox Church, Kattappuram, Thiruvalla
- St. Thomas Orthodox Church, Alappuzha
- St. George Orthodox Church, Anaprampal
- Mar Baselios Orthodox Church, Anicad
- St. Thomas Sleeba Orthodox Church, Anjilithanam
- St George Orthodox Church, Chengaroor
- St. George Orthodox Valiyapally, Chennithala
- St. Mary's Orthodox Church, Chennithala South
- St. Mary's Orthodox Church, Elavumkal
- St George Orthodox Church, Erathodu Veeyapuram
- St. Thomas Orthodox Church, Eraviperoor
- St. George Orthodox Church, Kadamankulam
- St. George Orthodox Church, Kadapra Bethlehem
- St. Thomas Orthodox Church, Kadapra-Mannar
- St. Mary's Orthodox Church, Kaipatta
- St. Mary's Orthodox Church, Kallooppara
- St. Stephen's Orthodox Church, Kallooppara
- St. George Orthodox Church, Karakkal
- Sleeba Orthodox Church, Kaviyoor
- St. Mary's Orthodox Church, Kuttoor
- St. Mary's Sehion Orthodox Church, Kunnamthanam, Vallamala
- St. George Orthodox Church, Vellampoika, Kunnamthanam
- Mar Gregorios Orthodox Church, Kuttapuzha
- St. John's Orthodox Church, Mallappally Bethany
- Marthamariam Orthodox Church, Mannar
- St. Mary's Orthodox Church, Manthanam
- St. Stephen's Orthodox Church, Meethalakara
- St. Kuriakose Orthodox Church, Melpadom
- St. John's Orthodox Valiyapally, Mepral
- St. Elias Orthodox Church, Kalikavu, Mepral
- Mar Gregorios Orthodox Church, Mundiapally
- St. Kuriakose Orthodox Church, Mundukuzhy
- St. George Orthodox Church, Muthoor
- St. George Orthodox Church, Mylamon
- St. George Orthodox Church, Nedumpram
- St. George Orthodox Church, Nedumpram Vengal
- St. Mary's Orthodox Church, Nellimoode Bethany
- St. Mary's Orthodox Church, Niranam
- St. Thomas Orthodox Church, Vadakkumbhagom, Niranam
- St. Mary's Orthodox Church, Panayampala North
- St. Stephen's Orthodox Church, Panayampala South
- St. Mary's Orthodox Church, Pandankery
- St. Peter's Sehion Orthodox Church, Parumala Seminary
- St. Thomas Orthodox Church, Parumala
- St. George Orthodox Church, Parumala
- St. Mary's Orthodox Church, Parumala
- St Peter's & Paul’s Orthodox Church, Pathicadu
- St. Thomas Orthodox Church, Pavukkara
- St. George Orthodox Church, Perumpettimon
- St. Mary's Orthodox Church, Pulikeezhu
- St John's Orthodox Church, Punnaveli
- St. Mary's Oorsalem Orthodox Church, Puramattom
- St. Kuriakose Orthodox Church, Puramattom
- St. Mary's Orthodox Church, Thalakulam
- St. Mary's Orthodox Church, Kizhakkekara, Thalavady
- St. Stephen's Orthodox Church, Thalavady
- St. Thomas Orthodox Church, Thalavady West
- St. George Orthodox Church, Thengeli
- Baselios Mar Gregorios Orthodox Church, Thirumoolapuram
- St. Mulk Orthodox Church, Kavumbhagom, Thiruvalla
- St. George Orthodox Church, Paliakkara, Thiruvalla
- St. Mary's Orthodox Church, Valanjavattom
- St Mary's Orthodox Church, Valanjavattom East
- St. George Orthodox Church, Valanjavattom West
- St. Mary's Orthodox Church, Veeyapuram
- St. George Orthodox Church, Vengal Bethany
- St. Mary's Orthodox Church, Venpala
- Mar Baselios Orthodox Church, Kudakkapathal
- Mar Yacob Burdhana Orthodox Church, Murani
- Mar Baselios Orthodox Church, Thelliyoor
- St. John's Orthodox Church, Vennikulam Bethany
- St. George Orthodox Church, Vennikulam Muthupala
- St. Behanans Orthodox Church, Vennikulam
- St. Mary's Orthodox Church, Vennikulam
