= St Mary's Orthodox Church, Kallooppara =

St.Mary's Orthodox Syrian Church, Kallooppara
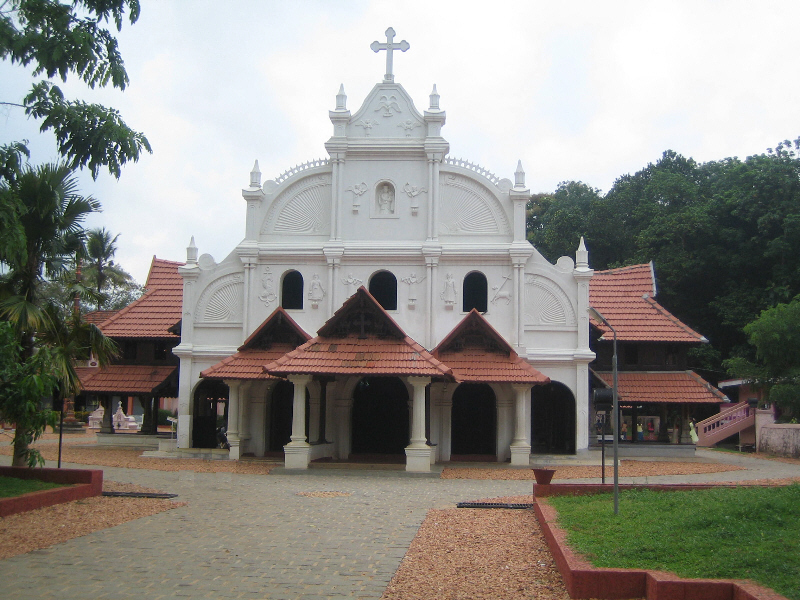
- St.Mary's Orthodox Syrian Church, Kallooppara
- St.Mary's Orthodox Syrian Church, Kallooppara
- Location: Kallooppara, Kerala, India
- Denomination: Malankara Orthodox Syrian Church
- Tradition: Syriac, Malayalam
- Website: www.kalloopparapally.com

History
- Founded: AD 1339
- Dedication: St.Mary

Administration
- Diocese: Niranam Diocese

St. Mary's Orthodox Syrian Church (കല്ലൂപ്പാറ പള്ളി) is a parish of the Malankara Orthodox Syrian Church situated in the small Keralan village of Kallooppara, India.

Yuhanon Chrysostamos became the bishop of the church in 2007.

== Church history ==
=== Establishment ===
Long ago Christians living in Kallooppara depended on the church at Niranam, 13 miles away. The journey by vallam boat was tedious, tiresome and risky.

The Edappally Kings were ruling at this time. One day the ruling king of Edappally was resting in the Elangalloor Maddom and he saw some people travelling on a small boat, singing melodious hymns and chanting prayers. The king stepped down to the river bank and found it to be a funeral procession that going from Manimala to Niranam Church for the burial, since Niranam Church was the only Christian church in central Travancore at that time.

According to local history, this sight moved the king's heart and allowed him to realize the hardship of his Christian subjects. He pointed to a plot of land on the other side of the river and gave the Christians permission to bury the body and build a church there. Although there is no clear evidence of the origin and age of the church, folklore says that the foundation stone was consecrated on 3rd Karkkidakam (Malayalam calendar). The founding stone of the present church was laid on Malayalam month Karkkidakam 3rd of the year 515 (AD 1339).

=== Early challenges ===
Around AD 1750, the Kalloopara St. Mary's Orthodox church was ordered to be demolished by a judge from Travancore High Court of Quilon, as the church had incurred huge debts. After the court hearings, the judge ordered the church building to be demolished and its land to be taken over by the creditor (Pocku Moosa Haji - Quilon).

Church members travelled across the river and informed Valiya Avirah Tharakan (grandson of Avirah Tharakan of Sankara Puri Adangapurathu and Maria/Shri Devi - niece of the Edappally King). Valiya Avirah Tharakan immediately paid off all of its debts by a form of gold "bananas" from the ara ('safe'), and took control of the church and its property.

While holding complete control of Perumpranad district on behalf of the Edappally King, Valiya Avirah Tharakan rebuilt St. Mary's Orthodox Church at his own cost, completing the work circa AD 1755. Some parts of that construction and artwork of the church are still visible inside, particularly the altar and the roof areas.

Later, many parts of the church were renovated and more buildings were built for other activities. Today the church, one of the oldest churches in Travancore, is a center of pilgrimage in the Malankara Orthodox Church.

== Missions ==
The church runs several groups including MGOCSM, OVBS, Martha Mariam Samajan, prayer groups, youth groups and Sunday schools.
