= Thomattuchal =

- village
- Country: India
- State: Kerala
- District: Wayanad

Population (2011)
  - Total: 17,984

Languages
  - Official: Malayalam, English
- Time zone: UTC+5:30 (IST)
- PIN: 6XXXXX
- ISO 3166 code: IN-KL
- Vehicle registration: KL-73

Thomattuchal is a village in Wayanad district in the state of Kerala, India.

== Demographics ==
As of 2011 India census, Thomattuchal had a population of 17984 with 8802 males and 9182 females.
