= Mallappally Taluk =

Mallappally Taluk is a tehsil in Pathanamthitta District of Kerala State, India. It comes under Thiruvalla Constituency & Thiruvalla Revenue Division.

== Villages ==
The following villages are part of the Mallappally Taluk:

- Kunnamthanam
- Anicadu
- Vaipur
- Keezhuvaipur
- Mallappally
- Murani
- Kallooppara
- Puramattom
- Vennikulam
- Ezhumattoor
- Thelliyoor
- Kottangal
- Chunkappara
- Perumpetty
- Kottanad

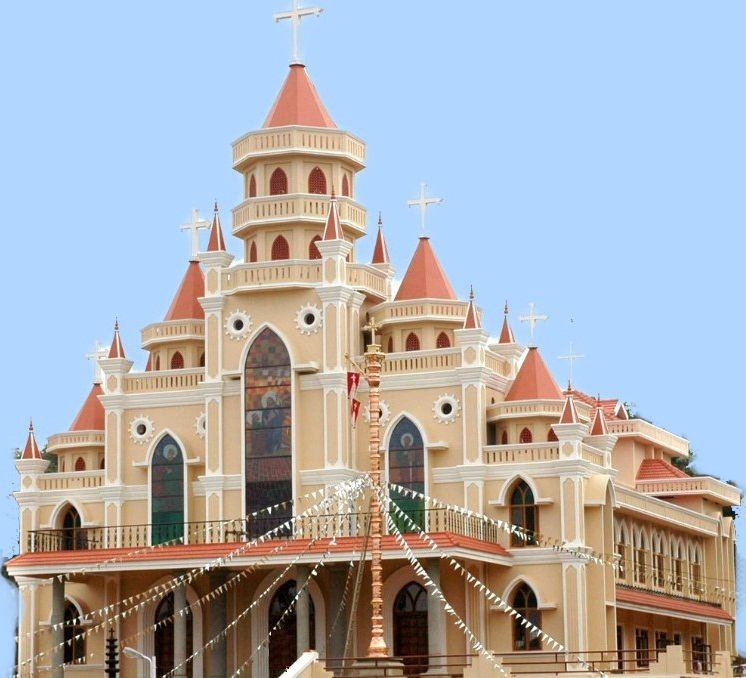
Pathicadu Church

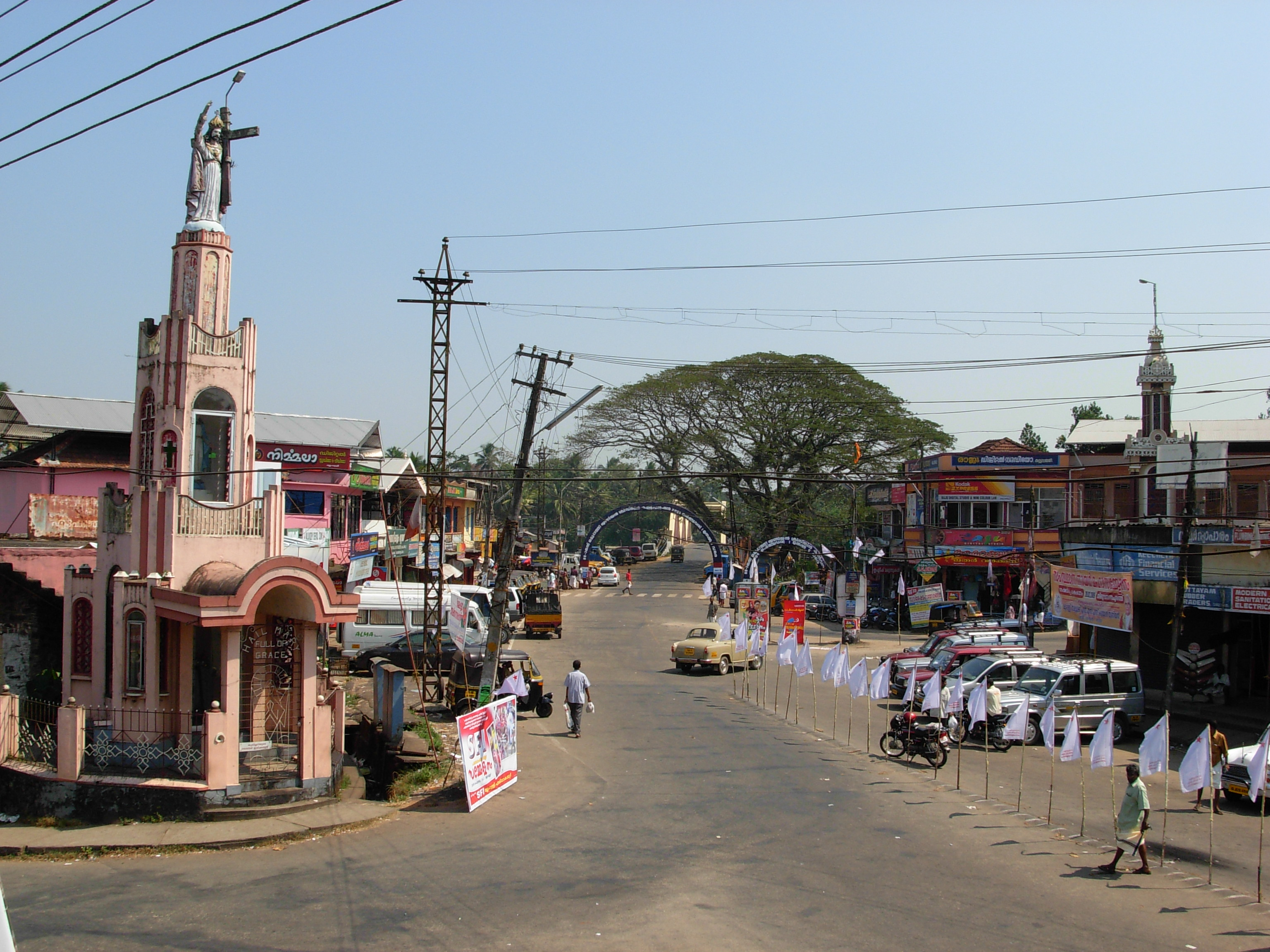
Mallappally Town

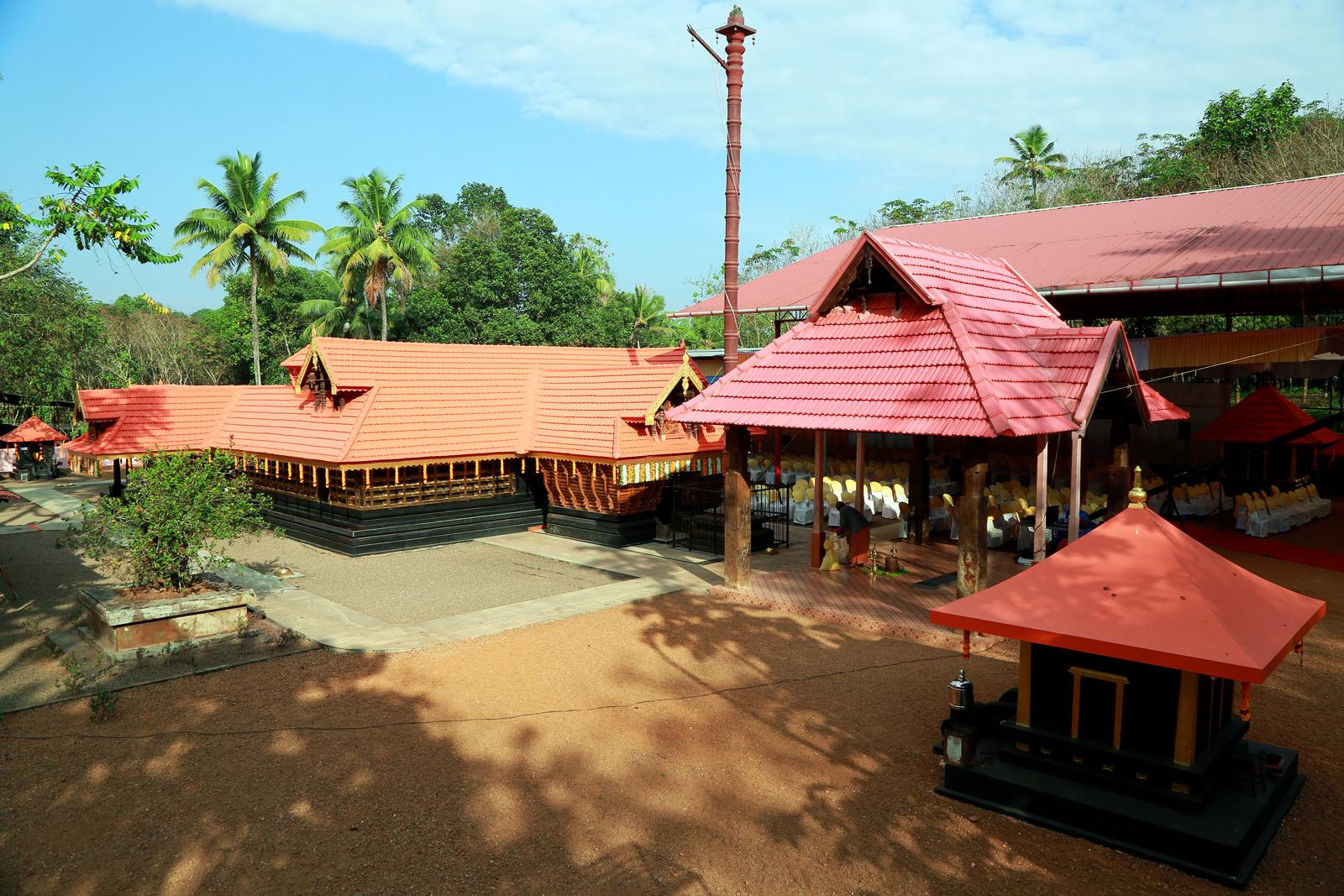
Anikkatil Amma Temple

== Religion ==
Mallappally is the birthplace of a large number of Kerala Bishops of many Christian denominations. Some of these are Saint Vattasseril Geevarghese Mar Dionysius (Vattasseril Thirumeni), Archbishop Valakkuzhy Joseph Mar Severios, Bishop Modayil MC Mani, Evangeilical Bishop Panamootil PS Varghese, and Baselios Cardinal Cleemis.

== Festivals ==
Every year during the summer months when the river water recedes, many sandy beds are formed in the middle of the river, large enough to hold conventions and festivals on. The Mallappally convention and the Shivarathri festival take place on two such large sandy patches near the Manimala Bridge across the river. Vishu mahotsavam, held in the Pariyaram Sree-Krishna swami temple, is another old event. People from various parts of the Mallappally and Tiruvalla taluks come for the fest.
