= Padichira =

- village
- Location in Kerala, India Padichira (India)
- Coordinates: 11°50′10″N 76°10′30″E
- Country: India
- State: Kerala
- District: Wayanad

Population (2011)
  - Total: 28,970

Languages
  - Official: Malayalam
- Time zone: UTC+5:30 (IST)
- PIN: 673579
- ISO 3166 code: IN-KL
- Vehicle registration: KL-73

Padichira is a village near Pulpally in Wayanad district in the state of Kerala, India.

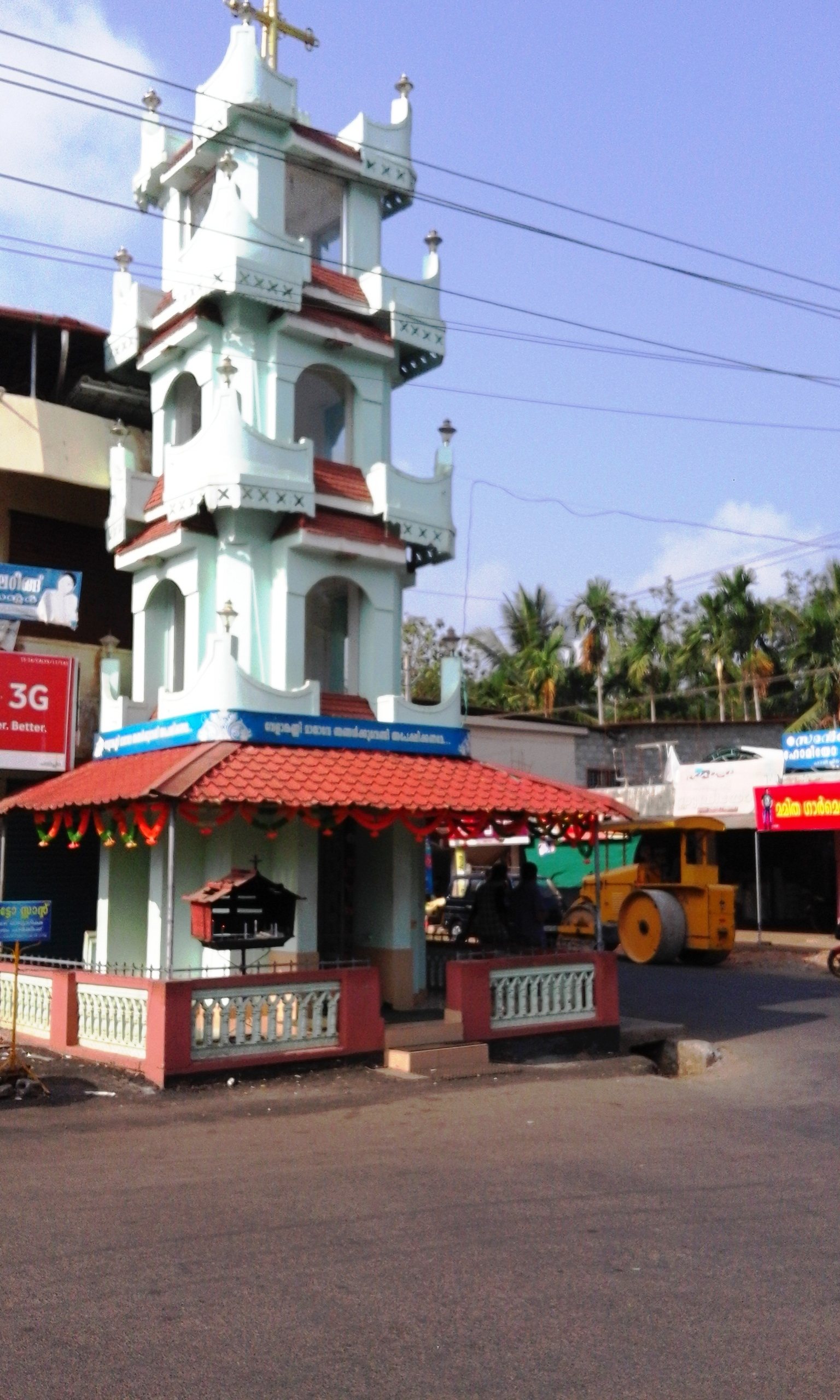
Padichira Town Image

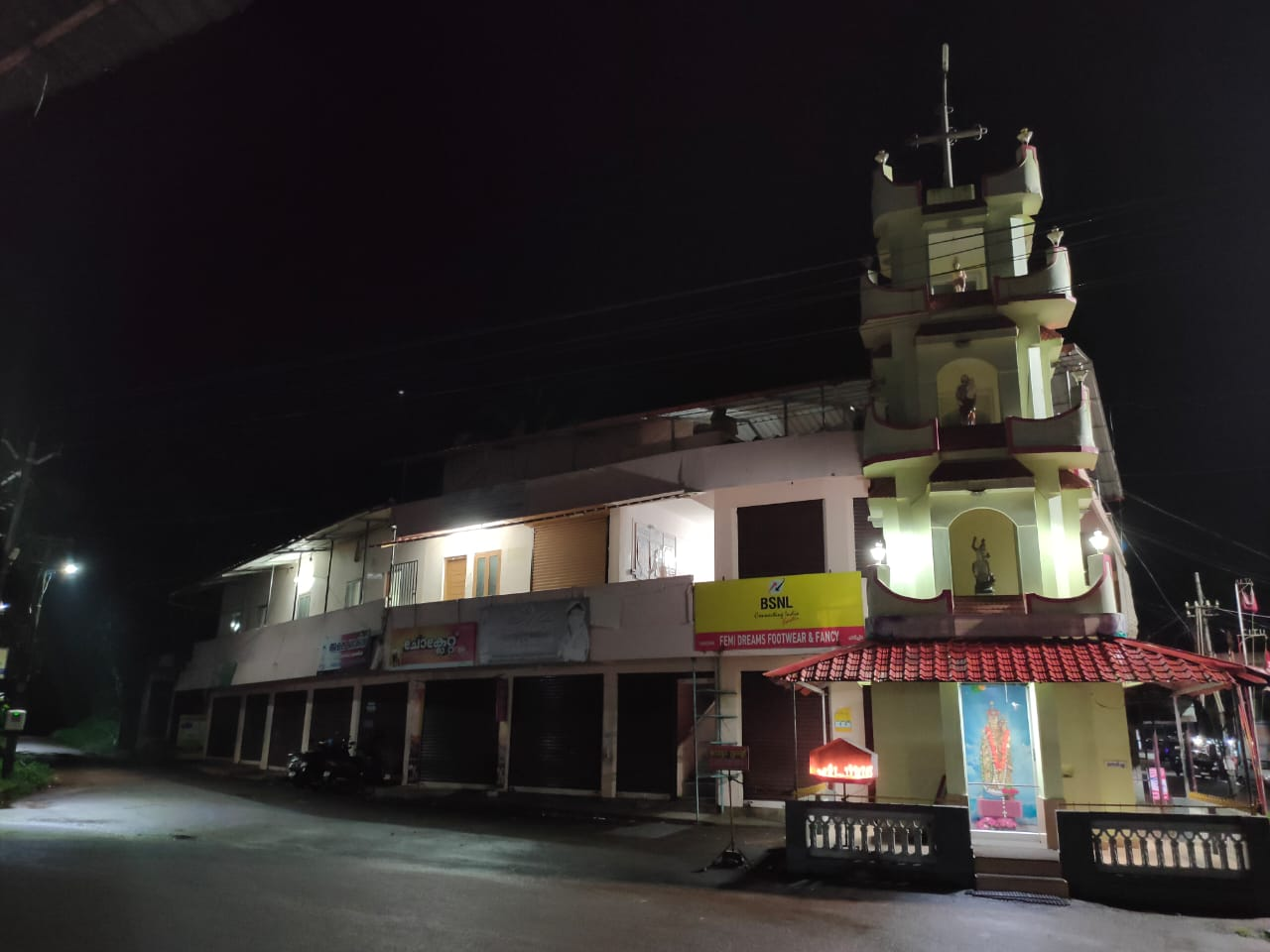
Padichira Town Night View

== Demographics ==
As of 2011 India census, Padichira had a population of 28970 with 14409 males and 14561 females.
