= Purakkadi =

- village
- Country: India
- State: Kerala
- District: Wayanad

Population (2011)
  - Total: 21,022

Languages
  - Official: Malayalam, English
- Time zone: UTC+5:30 (IST)
- PIN: 673591
- Vehicle registration: KL-73

Purakkadi is a village near Meenangadi in Wayanad district in the state of Kerala, India.

== Demographics ==
As of 2011 India census, Purakkadi had a population of 21022 with 10388 males and 10634 females.

== Transportation ==
Purakkadi is 73 km by road from Kozhikode railway station and this road includes nine hairpin bends. The nearest major airport is at Calicut. The road to the east connects to Mysore and Bangalore. Night journey is allowed on this sector as it goes through Bandipur national forest. The nearest railway station is Mysore. There are airports at Bangalore and Calicut.
