= Memala =

- village
- Location in Kerala, India Memala (India)
- Coordinates: 8.652454°N 77.091126°E
- Country: India
- State: Kerala
- District: Thiruvananthapuram district

Government
  - Body: Gram panchayat

Languages
  - Official: Malayalam, English
- Time zone: UTC+5:30 (IST)

Memala is a small village in Puramattom panchayat, Pathanamthitta district, Kerala, India. The Peppara dam is near Memala.
