= Kunnamthanam =

- Census village
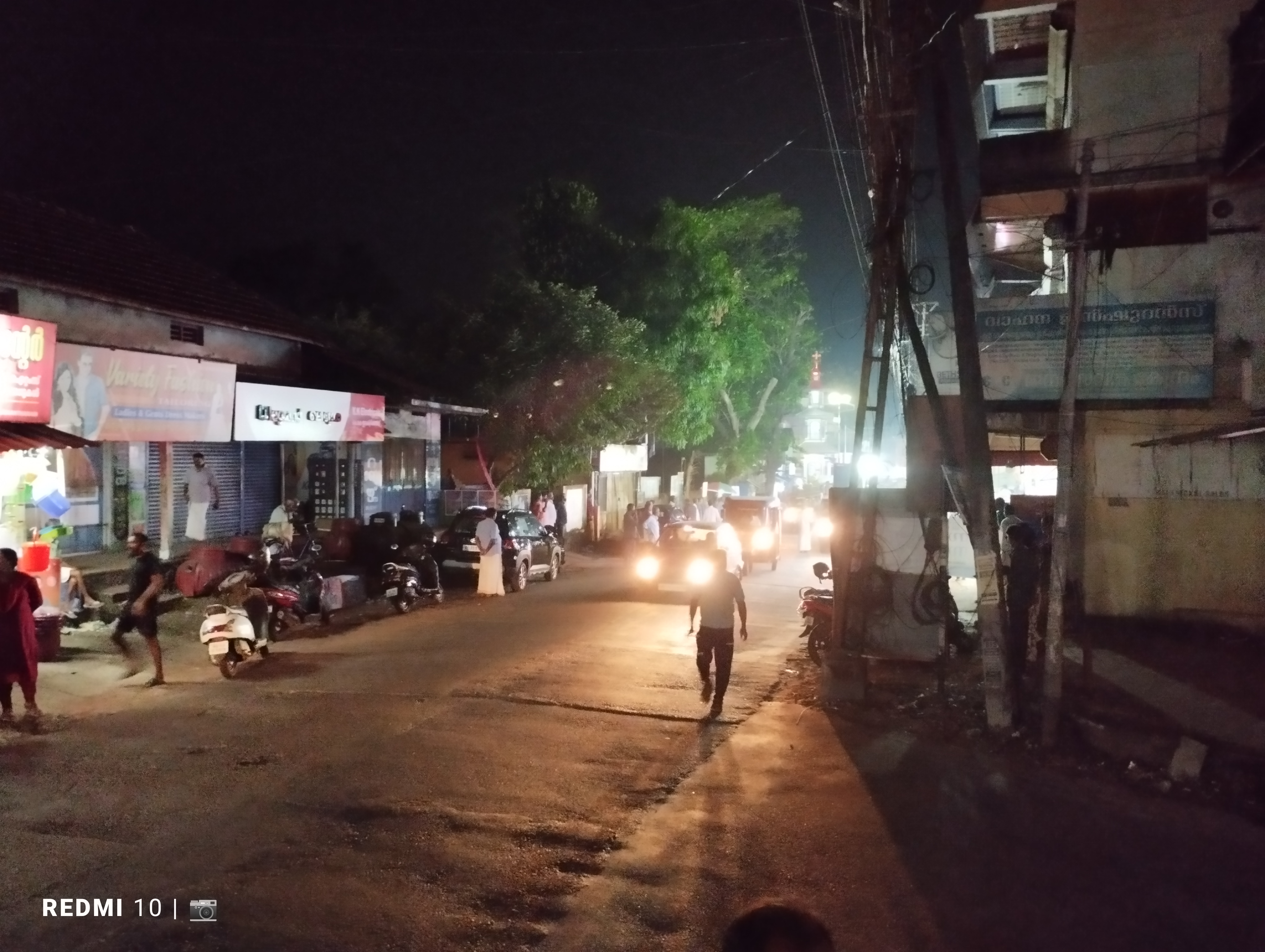
- Night view of Kunnamthanam Junction

- Location in Kerala, India Kunnamthanam (India)
- Coordinates: 9°26′0″N 76°36′45″E
- Country: India
- State: Kerala
- District: Pathanamthitta

Population (2011)
  - Total: 20,573
- Time zone: UTC+5:30 (IST)
- PIN: 689581
- Telephone code: 91469
- Vehicle registration: KL-28 (Mallappally)
- Literacy: 97.33%

Kunnamthanam is a census village in Kunnamthanam gram panchayat in the Mallapally taluk of the district of Pathanamthitta in Kerala.It comes under Thiruvalla Revenue Division & Thiruvalla Constituency.As of 2011, it had a population of 20,573.

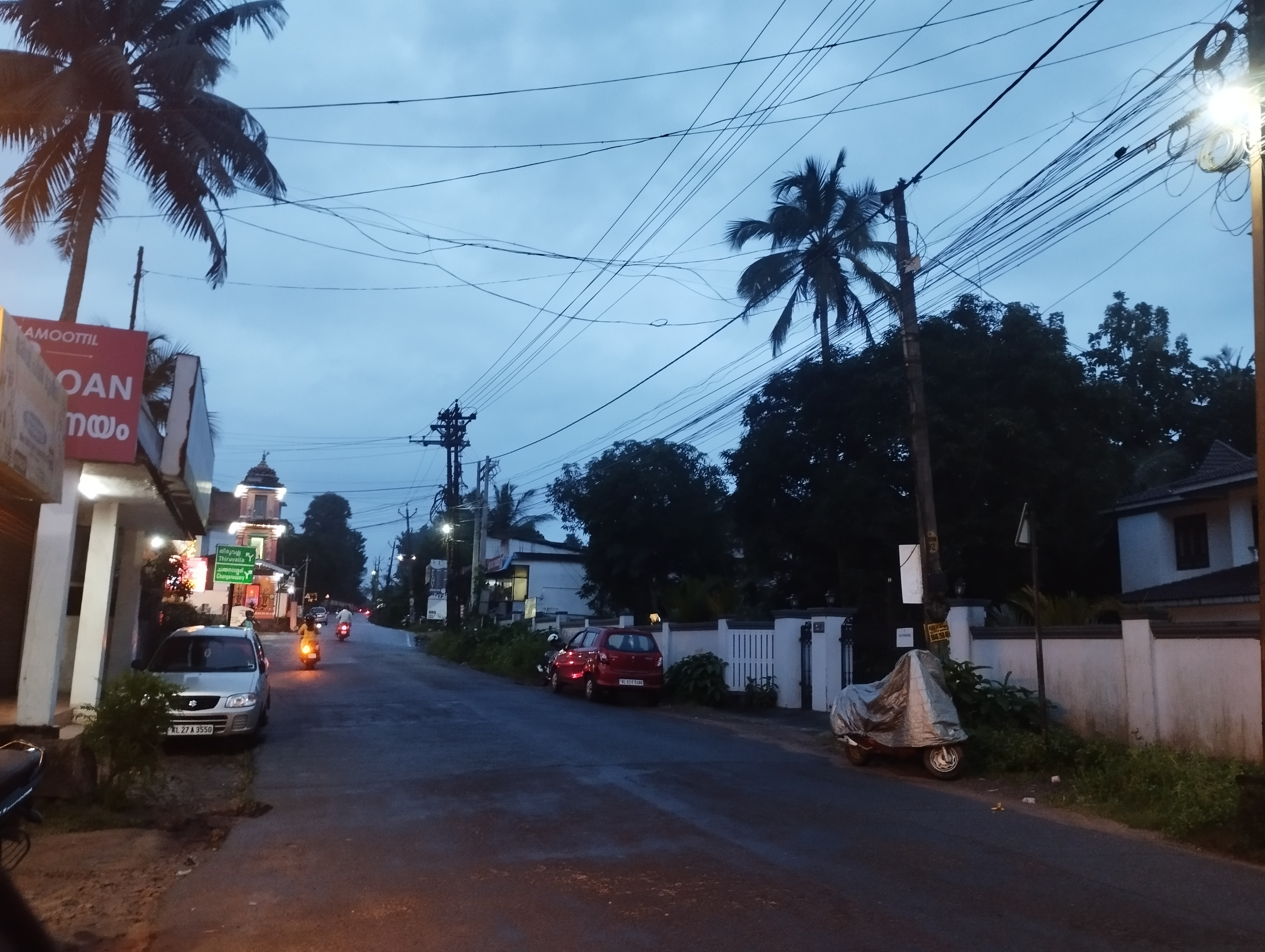
Kunnamthanam

Kunnamthanam has been named a Complete Yoga Village, where every family is known to be practicing yoga. The practice of yoga has been promoted by various social organisations and through churches.

== Demographics ==
As per the 2011 Indian census, Kunnamthanam has a population of 20,573. It has a sex ratio of 1112 females per 1000 males. Children below 6 years of age constitute 7.65% of the total population. Scheduled Castes and Scheduled Tribes constitute 13.89% and 0.28% of the population respectively. The total literacy rate was 97.33% (97.73% for males and 96.97% for females), which is higher than the state average of 94% and the national average of 74.04%.

== Syrian Christian Settlements ==
The Syrian Christian colonization profoundly affected the historical backdrop of trade and agribusiness in these parts. The place is, hence, home to numerous Syrian Christian groups of Kerala who own large farms and bungalows, due to the creation of latex.The Christians guarantee their underlying foundations from early settlements from Mesopotamian merchants and East Syriac Christians from Venad. Kunnamthanam turned into a significant warehouse for flavours like pepper, cardamom, and so forth. Syro-Malankara and Syrian Orthodox Christians occupations consisted of landowners, farmers and merchants.

== Festivals ==
=== Padayani ===
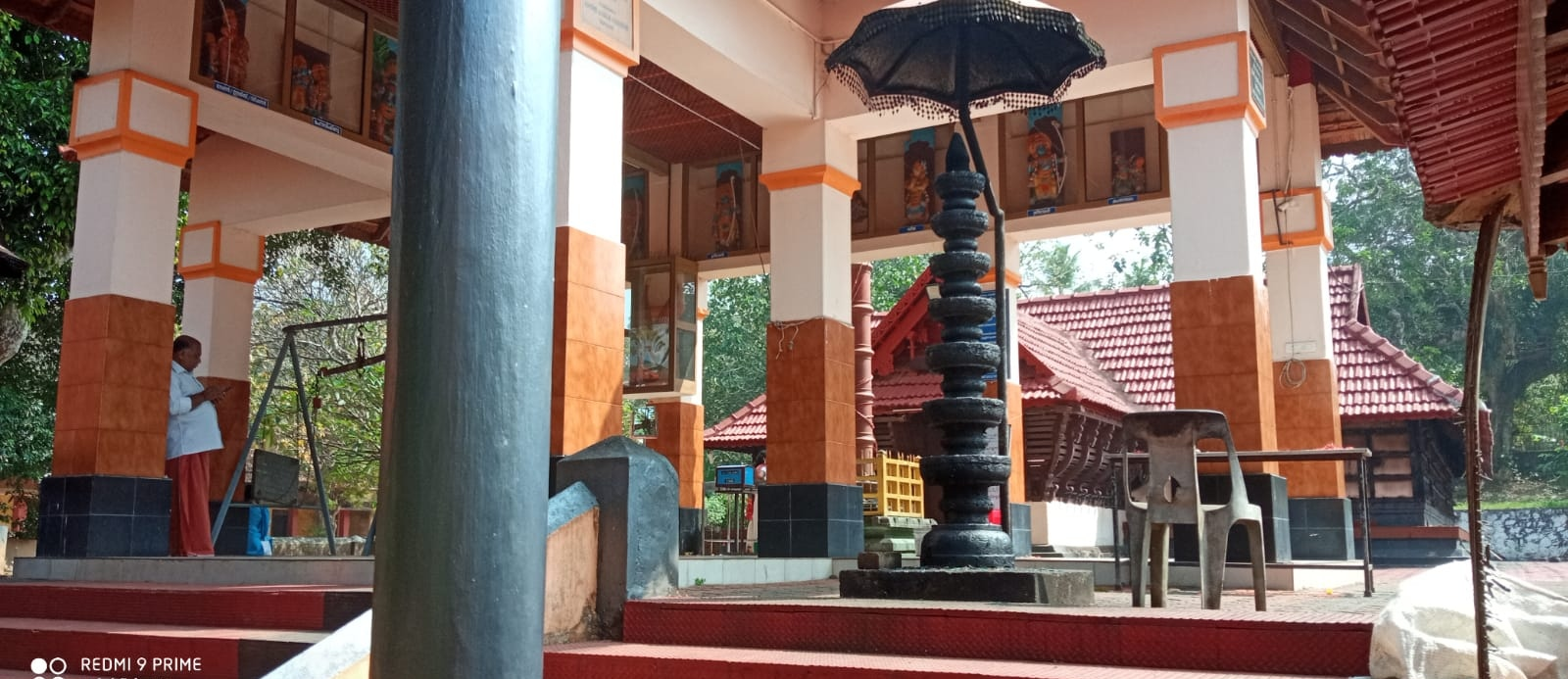
Madathilkavu Bhagavathy Temple

Kunnamthanam has three popular temples 1) Madathilkavil Bhagavathi Temple, 2) Pulappukave Shiva Temple The latter is famous for its Padayani, an ancient festival that has been revived in recent years.

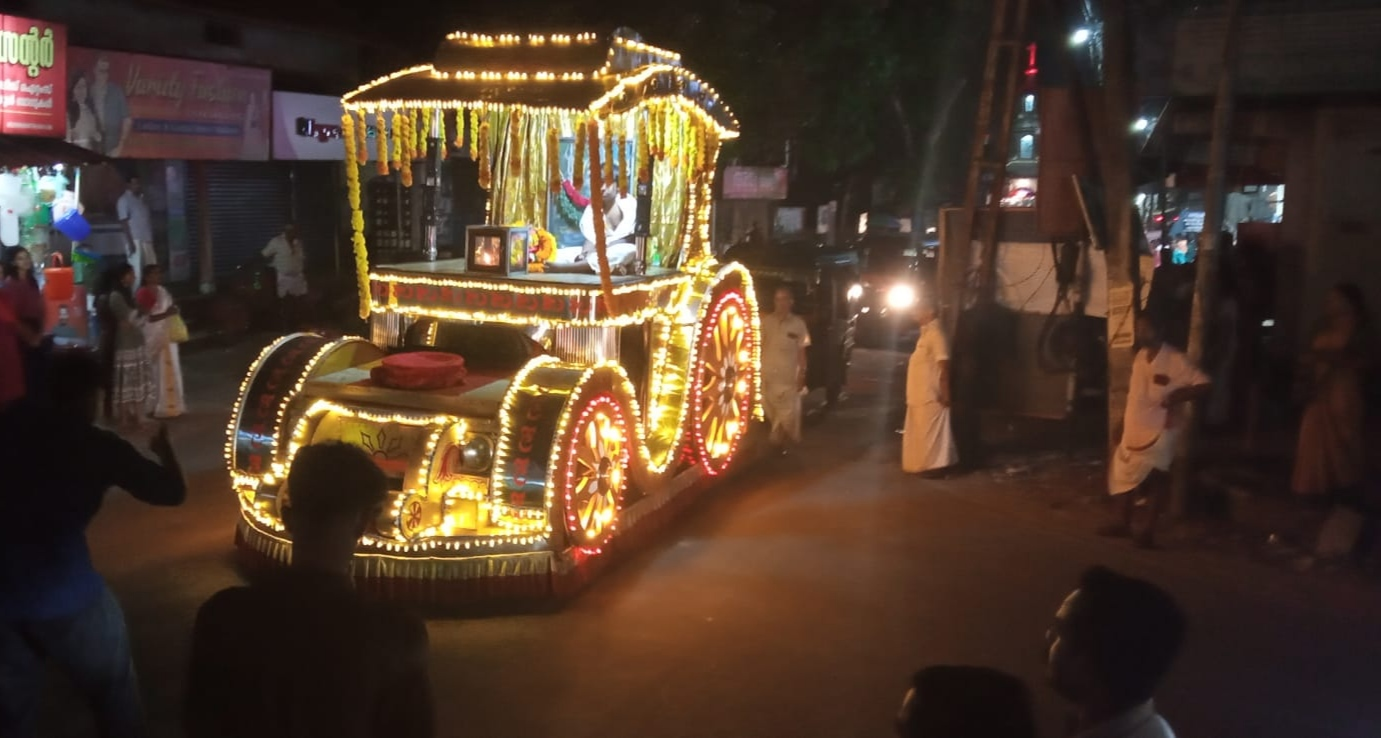
Shivaratri 2026

https://commons.wikimedia.org/wiki/File:Shivaratri_Bhasmaradha_Yatra.jpg https://commons.wikimedia.org/wiki/File:Shivaratri_Bhasmaradha_Yatra.jpg

== Tourist attractions ==
Madathilkavu Bhagavathy Temple is one of the famous temples in Pathanamtitta District situated in Kunnamthanam. This Temple is hallmark in Kunnamthanam.

https://commons.wikimedia.org/wiki/File:Kinfra_Industrial_Park,_Kunnamthanam.jpg St Joseph Catholic Church, Kunnamthanam, is located near the Kunnamthanam–Manthanam road. The Little Servants of the Divine Providence is a convent begun here. The convent has a retreat center called Zion Retreat Center as well as a Providence Home that takes care of orphans and the elderly. The main attraction of Kunnamthanam grama Panchayat is, Kunnamthanam industrial development area (KINFRA)

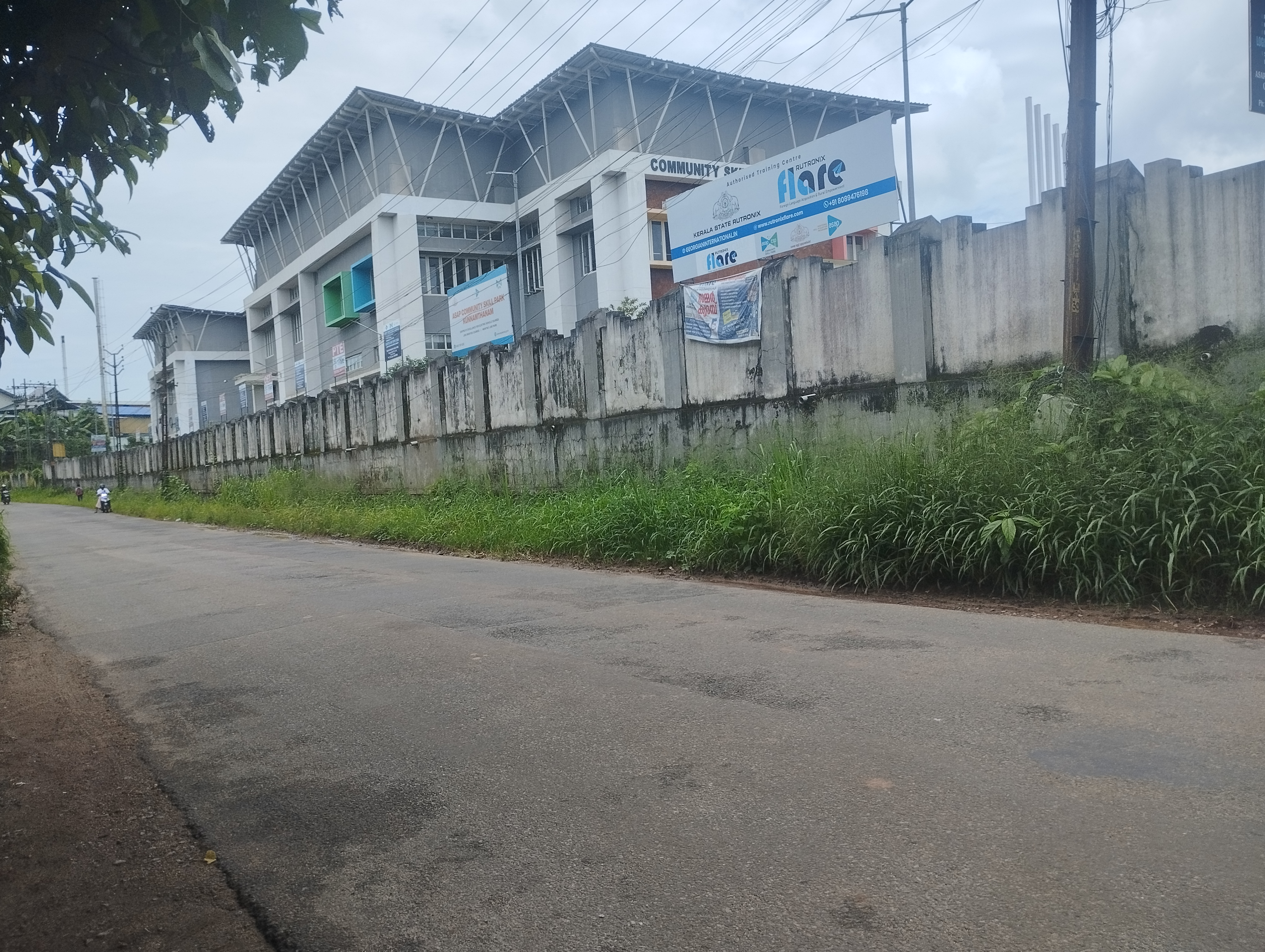
Kunnamthanam
