= Kottanad =

- village
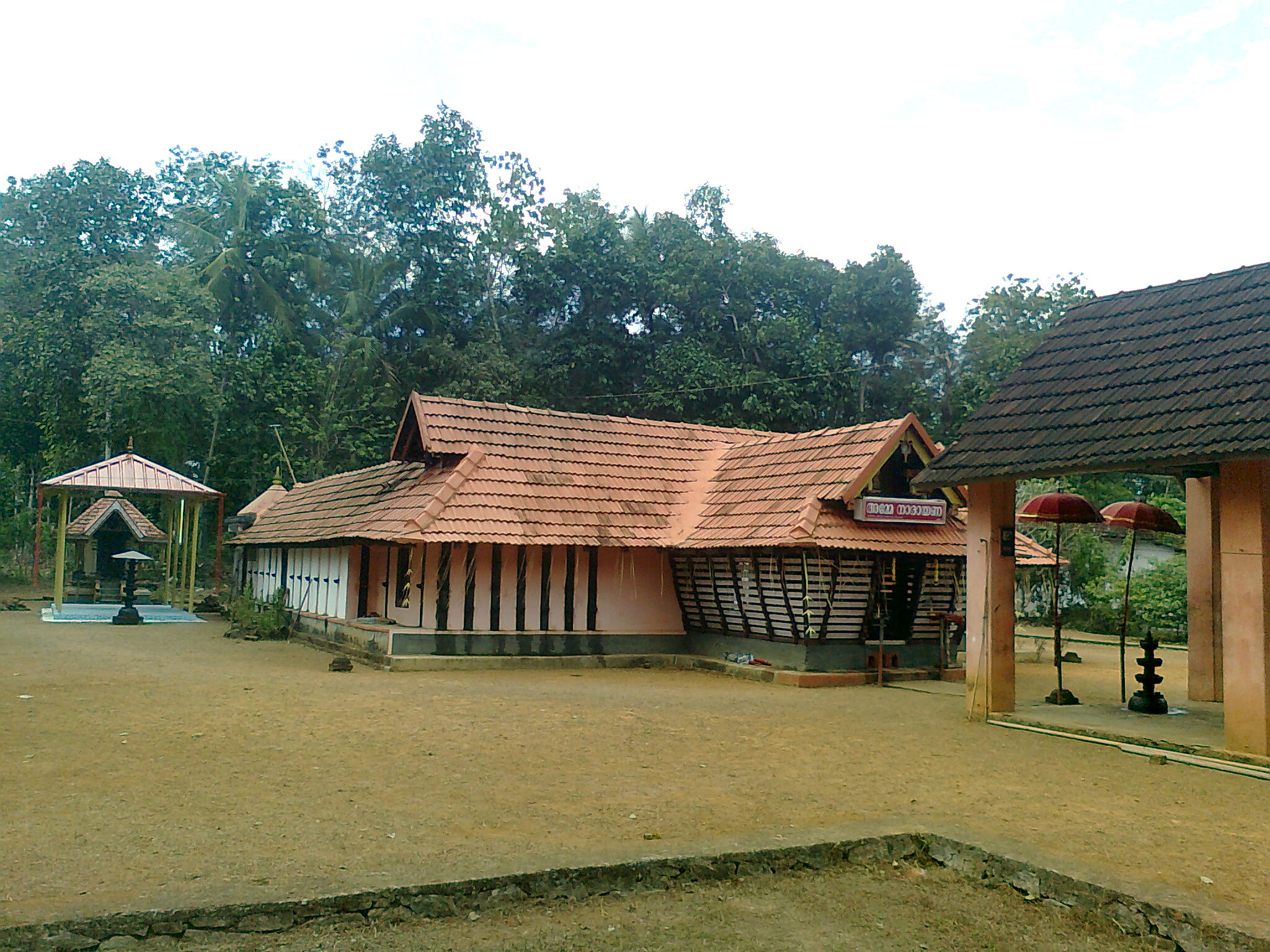
- Kottanad Pranamalakavu Devi Temple
- Interactive map of Kottanad
- Coordinates: 9°24′30″N 76°44′32″E
- Country: India
- State: Kerala
- District: Pathanamthitta

Government
  - Body: Kottanad Grama Panchayath
  - Density: 889/km^{2} (2,300/sq mi)

Languages
  - Official: Malayalam, English
- Time zone: UTC+5:30 (IST)
- PIN: 689615
- Telephone code: 91-(0)469-XXX XXXX
- Nearest city: Ranni
- Sex ratio: 1.091 ♂/♀
- Literacy: 84.76%
- Lok Sabha constituency: Pathanamthitta
- Vidhan Sabha constituency: Ranni
- Civic agency: Kottanad Grama Panchayath

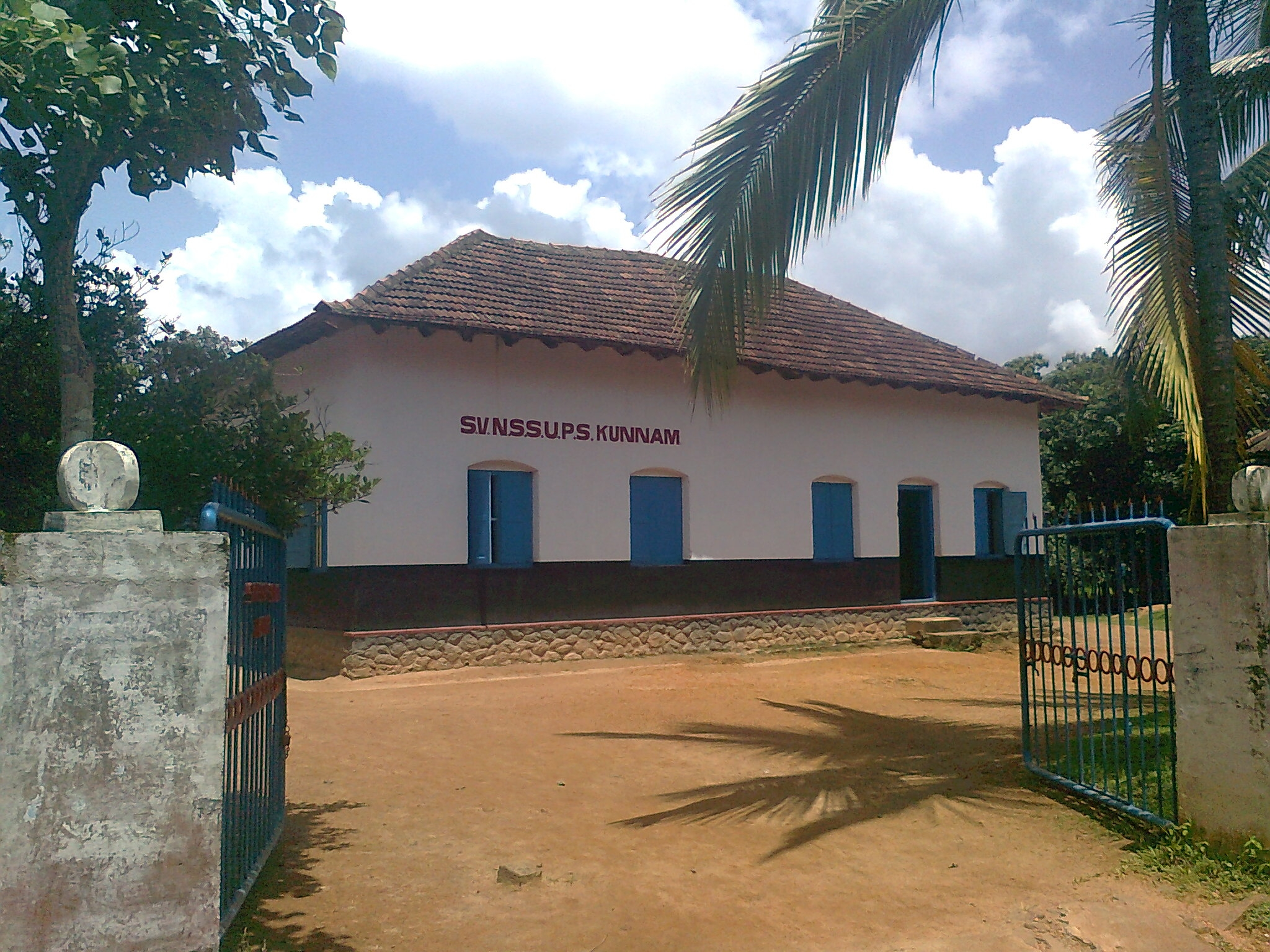
NSS school Kottanad

Kottanad is a village in Pathanamthitta district in the state of Kerala, India.

== Religion ==
Kottanad's major religions are Hinduism, Christianity, and Islam. Hindus (Brahmins, Nairs, Ezhavas, Viswakarma, & other SC-ST), Muslims and Christians (Roman Catholics, Knanaya, Malankara Catholic, St. Thomas Evangelical Church of India, Orthodox, Jacobite, Marthoma, The Pentecostal Mission known as CPM, Indian Pentecostal Church of God, etc., live in peace here.

== Climate ==
Like the rest of the state, Kottanad has a wet and maritime tropical climate. The region receives most of the rain from the South-West monsoon from June to August and the North-East monsoon during October and November. Although the summer is from March to May, it receives locally developed thundershowers in May. Due to the higher elevation, the climate is cooler towards the eastern area.

== Economy ==
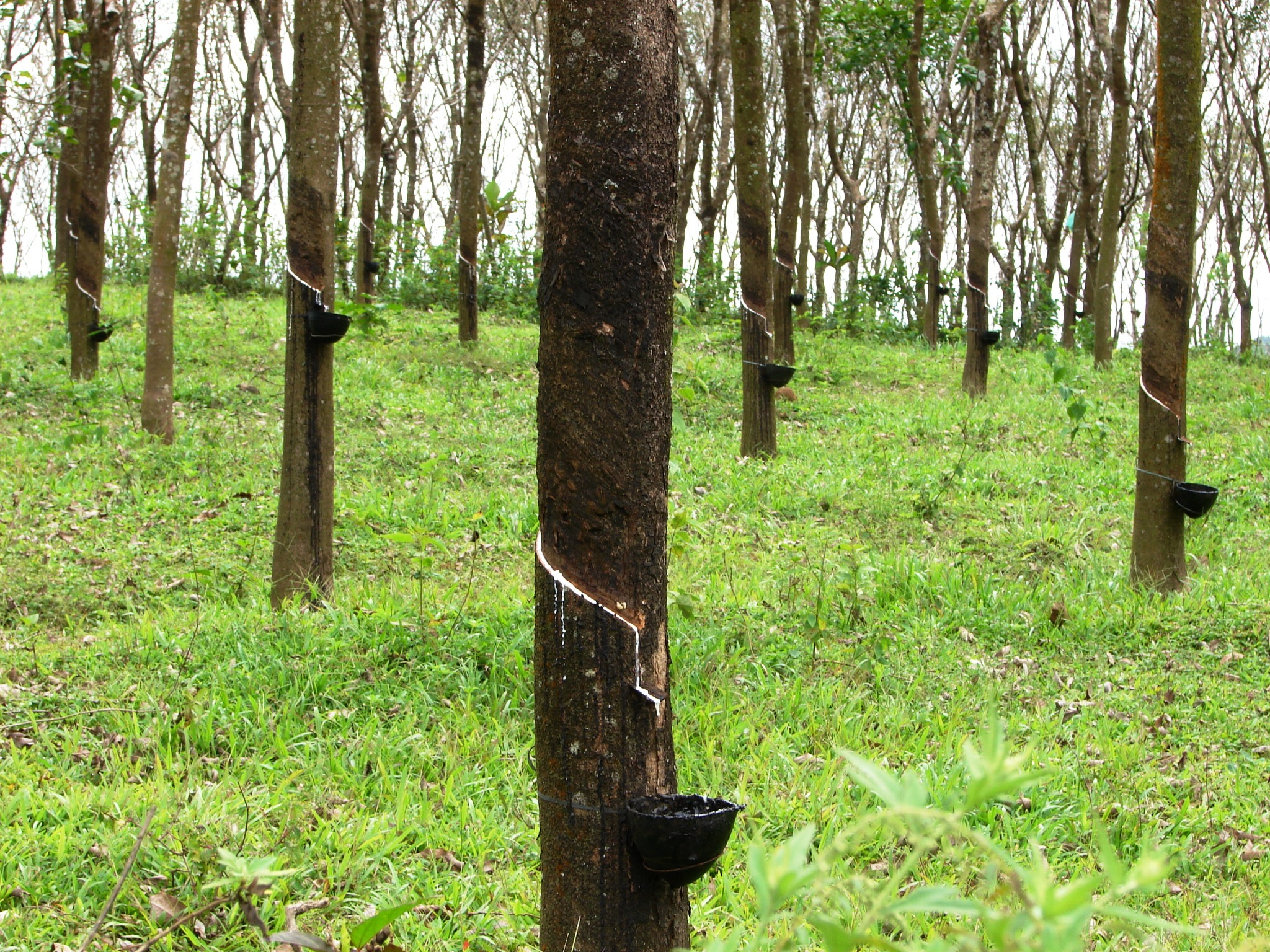
Rubber Trees in a Plantation

The economy of Kottanad is primarily from agriculture. Kottanad is one of the rubber producing villages in Kerala. The hilly terrain, high humidity and good rain make it suitable for rubber cultivation. Other major crops are coconut, tapioca and pepper. NRIs are also another major source of income.

== Facilities ==
Kottanad has the following facilities:

- Primary Health Centre, Kottanad
- Post Office
- Govt Upper Primary School
- Library
- Govt. Higher Secondary School
- Telephone Exchange
- Village Office
- PSU Bank (State Bank of India)
- Co-operative Banks.
- Krishi Bhavan

== Transport ==
Kottanad is largely dependent on private buses. There are few KSRTC buses passing via Kottanad. The nearest KSRTC bus terminus is in Mallappally. Auto rickshaws are available and generally hired for short distances (1–3 km) where bus service is non-existent or rare. Taxis and jeeps are other preferred modes of transport where the terrain is hilly or rugged.

The nearest railway stations are at Thiruvalla (TRVL) and Changanacherry and Chengannur.

Trivandrum International Airport and Cochin International Airport, at Nedumbassery, Kochi are the airports most conveniently used to fly there. The upcoming Sabari International Airport International Airport is around 20 km from here

== Civic administration ==
Kottanad Village is a part of Pathanamthitta district administration. The Kottanad village office is in Perumpetty.

== See also ==
- Ranni
- Pathanamthitta
- Kerala
