= Kadamankulam =

Village in Alappuzha District, Kerala, India

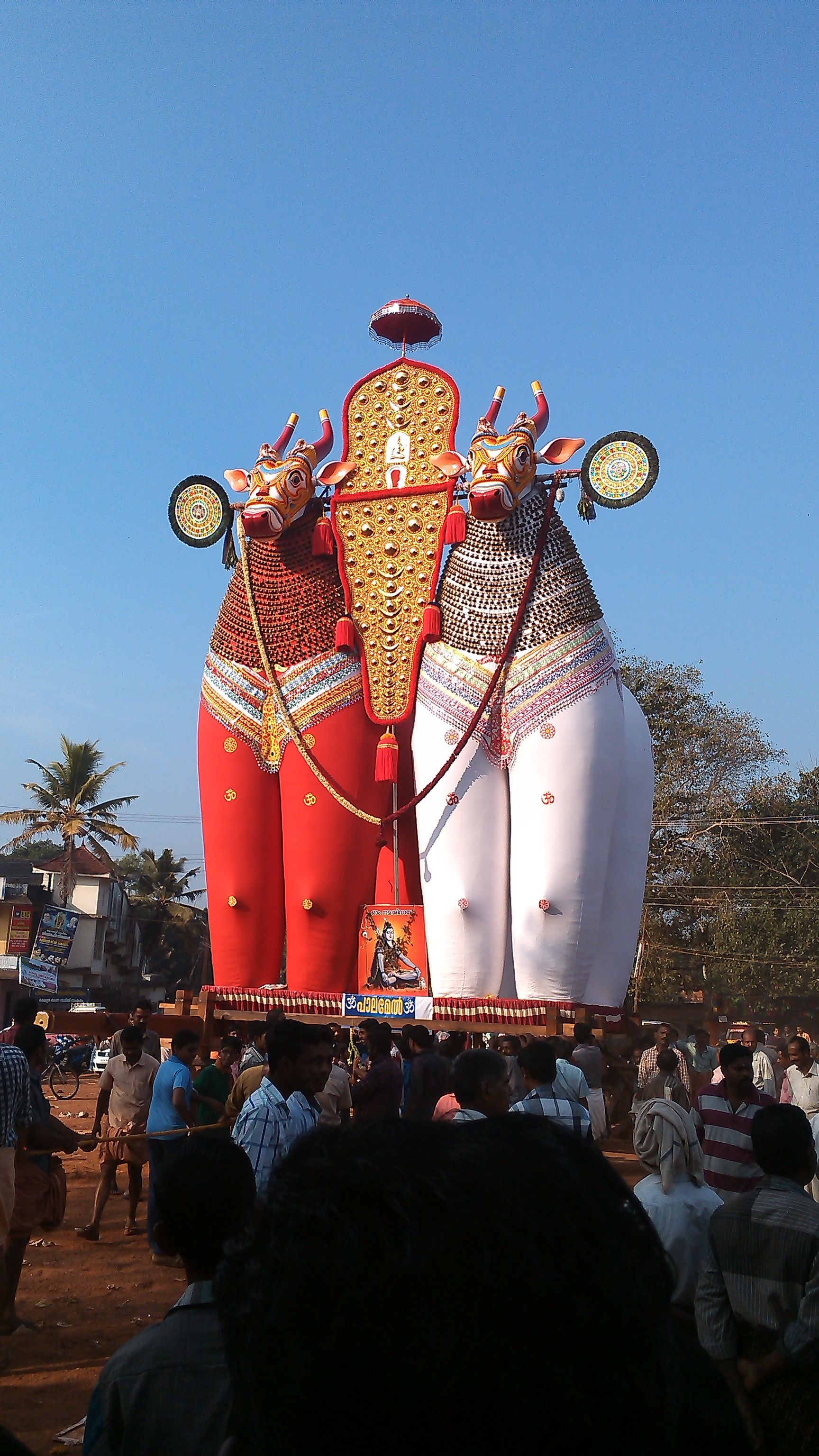
Padanilam temple festival

Kadamankulam is a village in Peruvanthanam village Panchayath, of Perumedu taluk, Idukki District of Kerala, India.

== Location ==
The nearest towns are Pandalam and Adoor. It is in the border of both Alappuzha and Pathanamthitta Districts.

== Economy ==
Agriculture is the main occupation of people here. Like any other village in this part of Kerala, many of youth are working outside India in different sectors. This village is near 2 kilometers from KP Road (Kayankulam- Punaloor) near Pazhakulam and 3 kilometers from MC road (Main Central) near Kurampala.

== Community life ==
St. Mary's Orthodox Church is one of the main religious institution here. Navodaya Art's and Sport's club, Navodaya Library and many other organisations are working here. The Onam celebrations on Thiruvonam day (the most important day of Onam) organised by Navodaya is the main celebrations here.

There is also a village with the same name, Kadamankulam, in Dindigul of Tamil Nadu.
