= Yuhanon Chrysostamos =

Oriental Orthodox bishop

- Church: Malankara Orthodox Syrian Church
- Diocese: Niranam Diocese
- In office: 2005 - Present

Orders
- Ordination: 5 March 2005

Personal details
- Born: 7 January 1954 (age 71); Kottoor, Thiruvalla

Yuhanon Chrysostamos is Metropolitan of Niranam Diocese of Malankara Orthodox Syrian Church in India.

In 2023, he is the bishop of St Mary's Orthodox Church, Kallooppara, and has been in place since 2007.

== Early life ==
He was born in 1954 in Mannil Puthen Purayil, Kottoor, Thiruvalla.

He completed his BSc Mathematics from SB College Changanasserry then affiliated to University of Kerala and joined the Orthodox Theological Seminary, Kottayam. He also studied his GST and BD from Serampore University. He completed a MTh from United Theological College, Bangalore, and a PhD from The San Francisco Theological Seminary.

== Career ==
He was ordained as a deacon on 19 April 1982, and became a priest on 5 June 1982.

He was Principal of St Paul’s Mission Training Center and has held several other teaching and speaking posts within the church.

He was ordained as Metropolitan on 5 March 2005.
