= Pazhakulam Punthalaveetil Temple =

Hindu temple in India

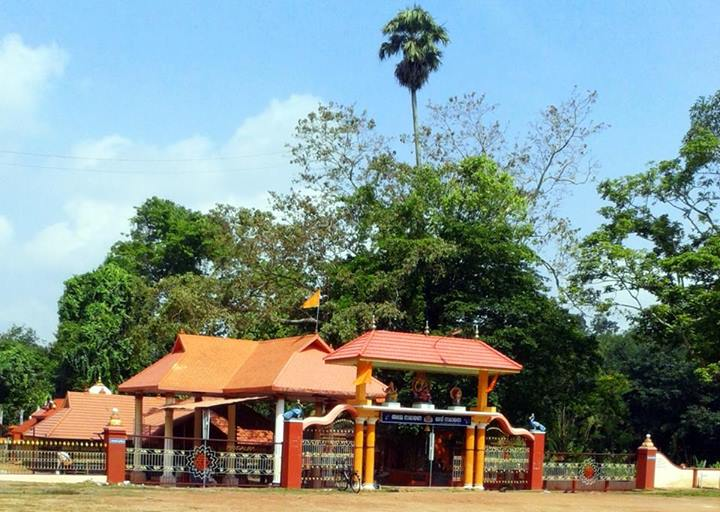

- Punthalaveetil Temple, Pazhakulam, Pathanamthitta, Kerala

Religion
- Affiliation: Hinduism
- District: Pathanamthitta
- Deity: Bhagavathy
- Festival: Pongala

Location
- Location: Pazhakulam
- State: Kerala
- Country: India
- Interactive map of Pazhakulam Punthalaveetil Temple
- Coordinates: 9°09′43.7″N 76°41′17.5″E

Architecture
- Type: Architecture of Kerala

Specifications
- Temple: One
- Elevation: 60.2 m (198 ft)

Pazhakulam Punthalaveetil Temple is a Hindu temple in Pazhakulam neighbourhood in Pathanamthitta, Kerala in the peninsular India. This temple is a Shakti temple at Konni in Kerala.

== Location ==
This temple is situated at an altitude of about 60.2 m above the mean sea level with the geographic coordinates of (9°09′43.7″N 76°41′17.5″E) in Pazhakulam.
