= Anicadu =

- Census village
- Location in Kerala, India Anicadu (India)
- Coordinates: 9.4741300°N 76.6770780°E
- Country: India
- State: Kerala
- District: Pathanamthitta

Area
  - Total: 19.04 km^{2} (7.35 sq mi)

Population (2011)
  - Total: 14,678
  - Density: 770.9/km^{2} (1,997/sq mi)
- Time zone: UTC+5:30 (IST)
- Telephone code: 0469
- Vehicle registration: KL-28
- Literacy: 95.31%

Anicadu is a census village in Anicadu gram panchayat in the Mallapally taluk of the district of Pathanamthitta in Kerala, India. As of 2011, it had a population of 14,678.

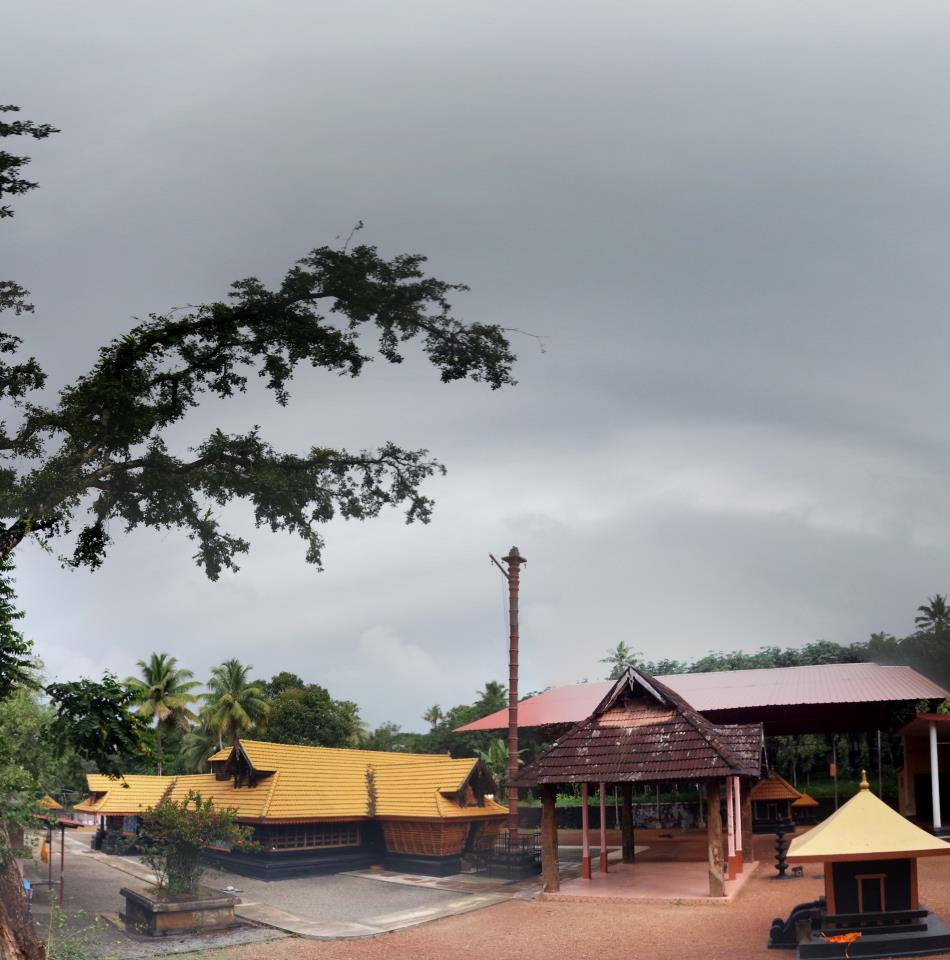
Anikkattilammakshethram

Anikkattilammakshethram is a most ancient Hindu Temple situated in Anicadu Village. Vaipur mahadeva temple is the most ancient temple situated in vaipur village of anicadu panchayath.

== Demographics ==
As per the 2011 Indian census, Anicadu has a population of 14,678. It has a sex ratio of 1089 females per 1000 males. Children below 6 years of age constitute 7.88% of the total population. Scheduled Castes and Scheduled Tribes constitute 12.24% and 0.58% of the population respectively. The total literacy rate was 97.54% (97.64% for males and 97.44% for females), which is higher than the state average of 94% and the national average of 74.04%.
