= Iravon =

Village in Pathanamthitta District, Kerala, India

Iravon is a village in aruvappulamPanchayat, Konni taluk, Pathanamthitta district in the state of Kerala, India. It is located near the banks of Achankovil river. Rubber cultivation is a major source of income for the local population. Iravon borders Konni reserved forest area.

== See also ==
- Kummannoor
- Geography of Kerala
