= Anikkattilammakshethram =

Hindu temple in Kerala, India

Anikkattilamma Temple
- Anikkattilamma Temple, Anicadu, Pathanamthitta, Kerala

Religion
- Affiliation: Hinduism
- District: Pathanamthitta
- Deity: Anikkattilamma
- Festivals: Utsavam; Pongala

Location
- Location: Anicadu
- State: Kerala
- Country: India
- Interactive map of Anikkattilamma Temple
- Coordinates: 9°27′26.8″N 76°40′38.3″E

Architecture
- Type: Architecture of Kerala

Specifications
- Temple: One
- Elevation: 46.77 m (153 ft)

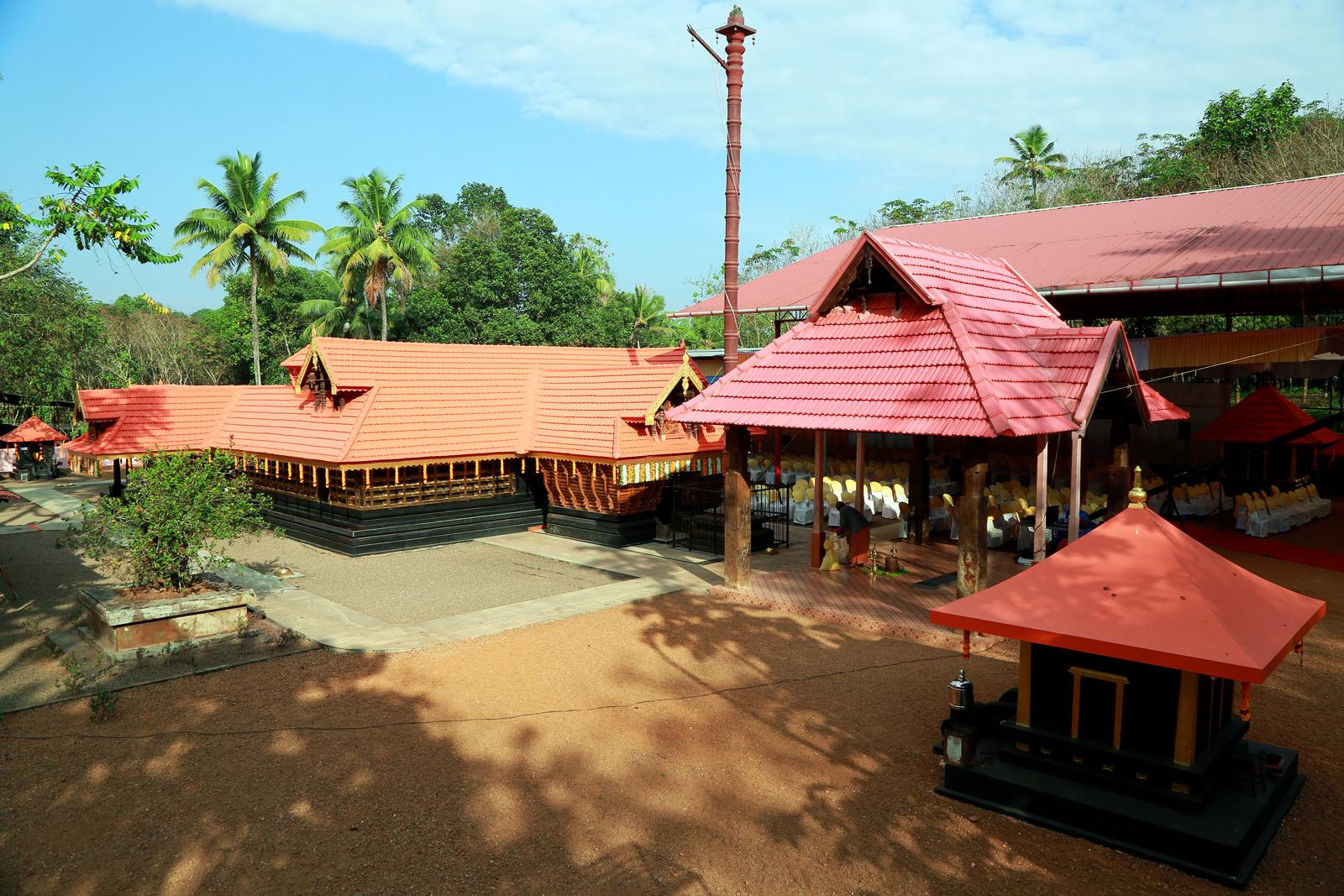
Famous Shivaparvathy temple in kerela

Anikkattilammakshethram is a Hindu Temple situated in Anicadu Village, 3.5 km from Mallappally in Pathanamthitta district in the southern part of Kerala, in the peninsular India.

In this temple, Jagat Pita and Jagat Mata (Lord Shiva and Parvati Devi) are worshiped with equal significance in one Sreekovil, which is one of the rarest of its kind in Kerala. Anthimahakalan and Ayilayekshi are symbolized in these idols, each measuring about 4 feet and installed side by side. Th Lord Shiva is in his Kiratha(Hunter)form welding a bow and an arrow in His arms and the Mother Goddess Parvati has a sword in Her hand. The temple, situated by the bank of river Manimala, is estimated to have come into existence around 1600 years ago during the early days of Edapally dynasty. Apart from the Deities in the main Sreekovil, there are Lord Siva, Bhadra, Nagaraja, Rakshasas and Yekshiamma in the sub-abodes in the courtyard.

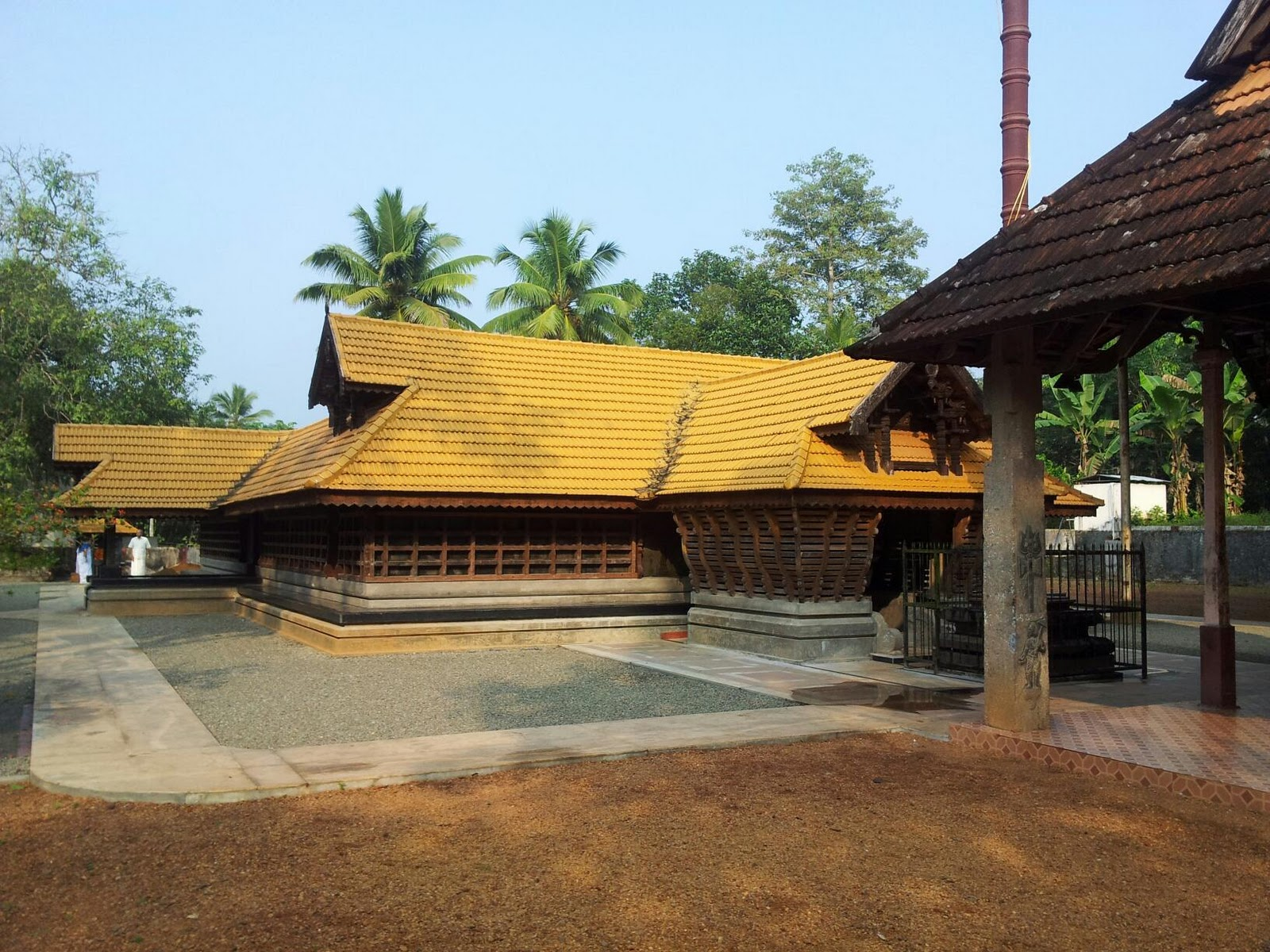
Anikkattilammakshethram

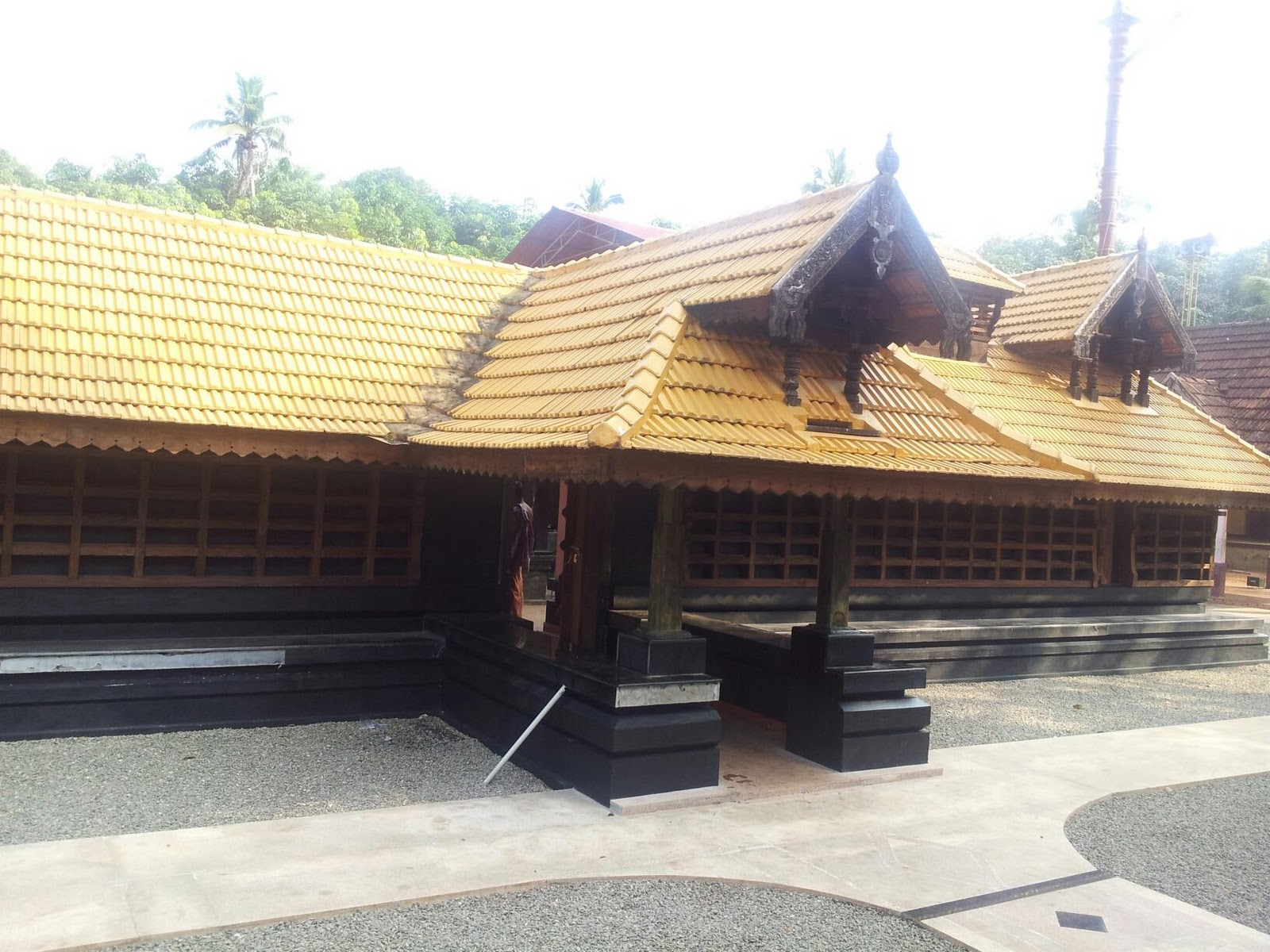

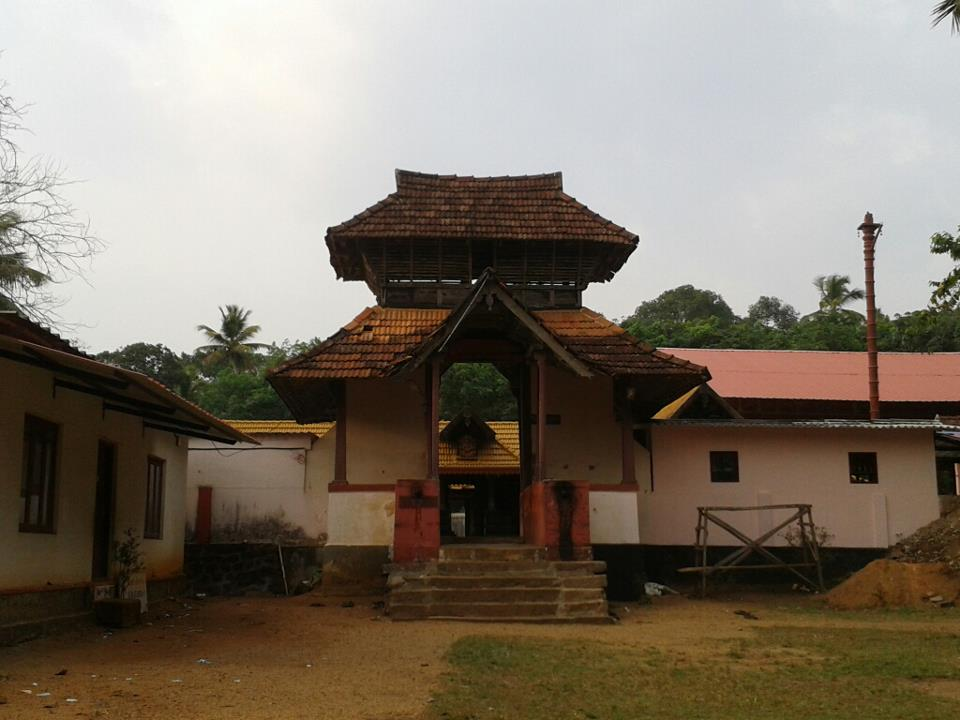
Anikkattilammakshethram gopuranada

Anikkattilamma temple is the abode of the goddess, who is the supreme preserver and destroyer. She cares for her devotees like a mother does her children. For the devotees, Anikkattilamma is the supreme power, capable of delivering all the wishes of her devotees. Several women devotees testify the supreme power of this shrine, and tell you how Anikkattilamma has blessed them with progeny and wishes of bountiful life.

== Location ==
This temple is located with the geographic coordinates of 9°27′26.8″N 76°40′38.3″E at an altitude of about 46.77 m above the mean sea level.

== Festivals ==
The Pongala Pooja is held on the day of Pooram during the month of Kumbham. The yearly festival (Utsavam) is celebrated for eight days during the month of Kumbham and concludes on the day of Pooram star. Anikkattilammayku pongala is the most reputed festival of this temple, which attracts devotees from all parts of Kerala. Thousands of women devotees throng together on the day of Pongala with their offerings to the Goddess and to seek blessings. The festival commences on Rohini day of Malayalam month Makaram-Kumbham (February–March). Pongala festival is an eight-day-long festival and on the 8th day of the festival is the famous Pongala. On that day, thousands of women throng to the temple to offer pongala in earthen pots. Pongala is a rice porridge, which boils over. The rush of women is so intense that the Pongala ground spreads outside the temple premises and into the public roads. Women offer pongala in a radius of about 2 km, essentially turning the whole of pullukuthy and kavanalkadavu into the holy grounds for the women to offer Pongala. No number of words can do justice to frenzy of the day's festivities, which wholly belongs to women devotees.

Devotees from all parts of India come and bow before the all powerful goddess, seeking an end to their afflictions and to receive blessings. The temple is just 4 km from the main town of Mallappally and is located at a rural-looking area, although the surroundings are highly urbanized. The Pongala 2017 Festival begins on 4 March 2017 and concludes on 11 March 2017. Ponkala festival celebrated annually at the renown of Anikkattilamma Temple. Pongala Mahotsavam is not only celebrated in, the whole world is awaiting for the holy ceremony and every devotees will pray to the Devi to bless them to be a part of it.

== Transport connections ==
Anikkattilammakshethram is reached through the towns of Mallappally and Karukachal by road. People who come from Southern Kerala go through Tiruvalla Mallappally and Pullukuthy. However the people coming from Northern Kerala go through Kottayam, Karukachal and Noorommavu.

== Distance ==
- 17 km from Thiruvalla railway station.
- 18 km from Changanacherry railway station.
- 31 km from Kottayam railway station.
- 113 km from Cochin International Airport, Nedumbassery.
