= Ezhumattoor =

- Census village
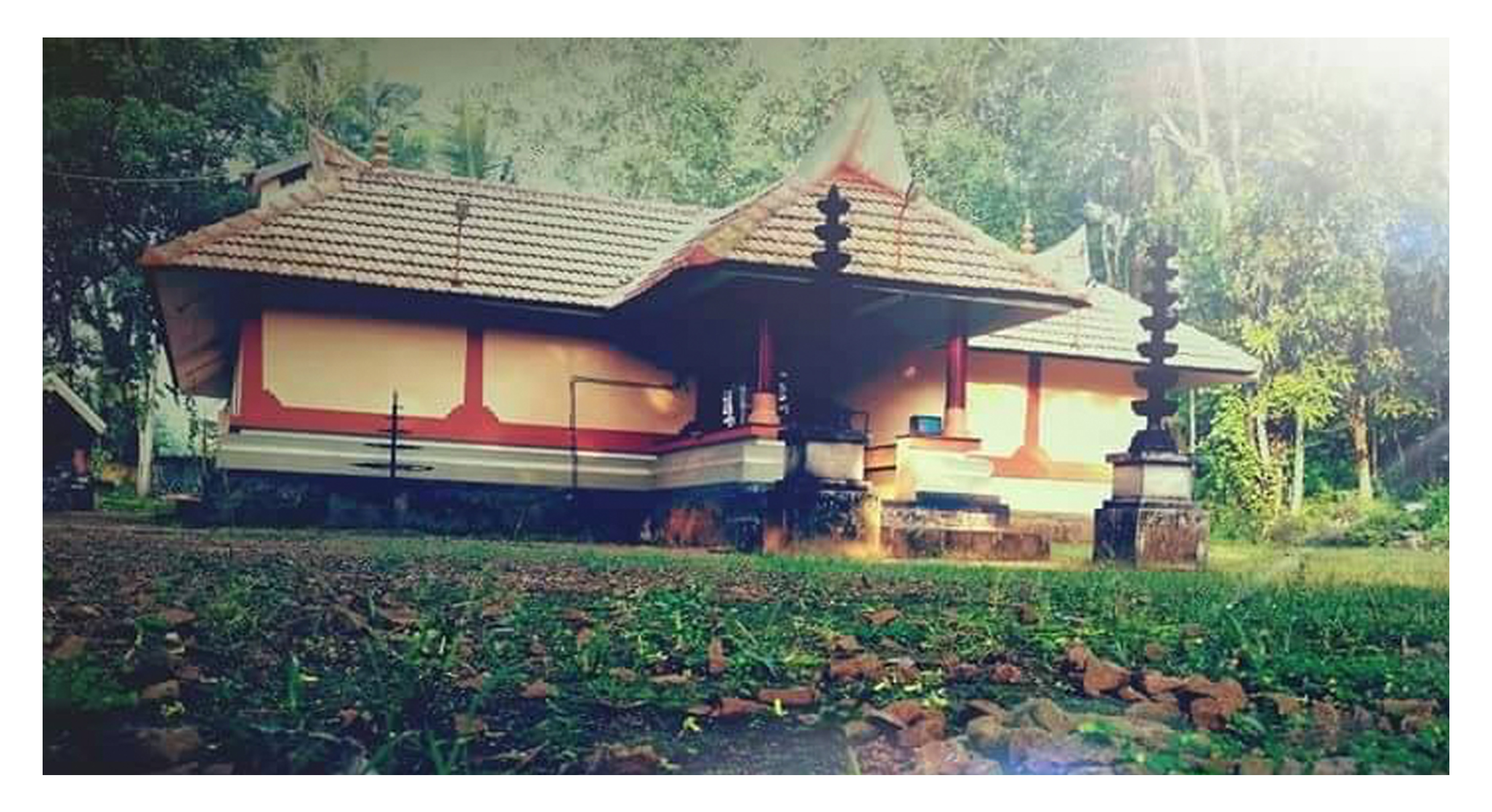
- Ezhumattoor Temple otherwise the Sree Panamattathukavu Devi Temple
- Interactive map of Ezhumattoor
- Coordinates: 9°25′0″N 76°42′0″E
- Country: India
- State: Kerala
- District: Pathanamthitta

Area
  - Total: 27.89 km^{2} (10.77 sq mi)

Population (2001)
  - Total: 18,918
  - Density: 678.3/km^{2} (1,757/sq mi)
- Time zone: UTC+5:30 (IST)
- PIN: 689586
- Vehicle registration: KL-28
- Literacy: 97.65%
- Website: lsgkerala.in/ezhumattoorpanchayat/

Ezhumattoor is a census village in Ezhumattoor gram panchayat in the Mallapally taluk of the district of Pathanamthitta in Kerala.It is part of Thiruvalla Constituency & Thiruvalla Revenue Division.As of 2011, it had a population of 16,837.

== Demographics ==
As per the 2011 Indian census, Ezhumattoor has a population of 10,698. It has a sex ratio of 1071 females per 1000 males. Children below 6 years of age constitute 7.67% of the total population. Scheduled Castes and Scheduled Tribes constitute 11.50% and 0.59% of the population respectively. The total literacy rate was 97.65% (98.17% for males and 97.18% for females), which is higher than the state average of 94% and the national average of 74.04%.

== Climate ==
Like the rest of the state, Ezhumattoor has a wet and maritime tropical climate. The region receives most of the rain from the South-West monsoon from June to August and the North-East monsoon during October and November. Although the summer is from March to May, it receives locally developed thundershowers in May. Due to the higher elevation, the climate is cooler towards the eastern area.

== Economy ==
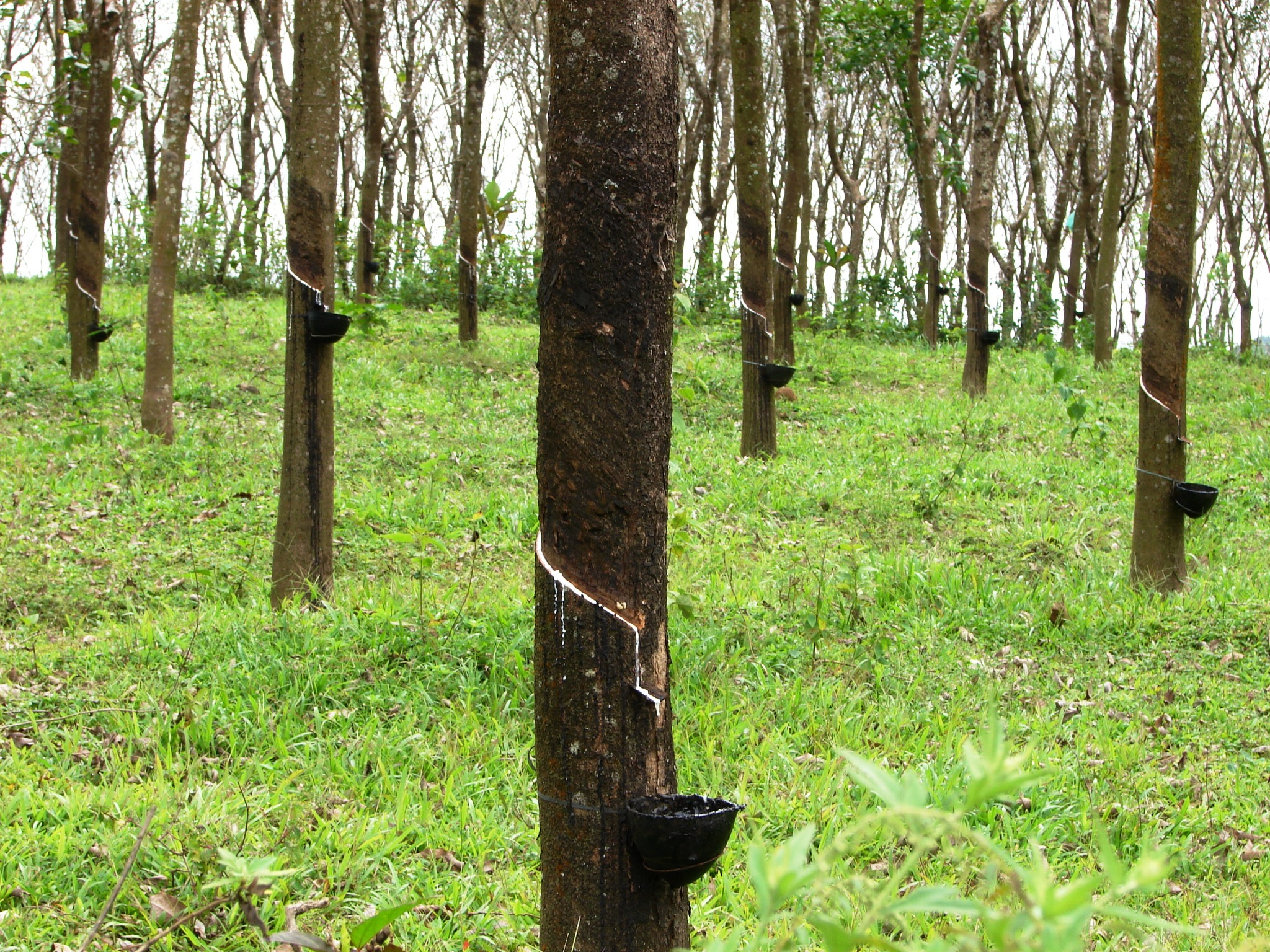
Rubber Trees in a Plantation

The economy of Ezhumattoor is primarily from agriculture. Ezhumattoor is one of the rubber producing villages in Kerala. The hilly terrain, high humidity and good rain make it suitable for rubber cultivation. Other major crops are coconut, tapioca and pepper. NRIs are also another major source of income.

Facilities Ezhumattoor has the following facilities:

1. Primary Health Centre, Ezhumattoor 2. Post Office 3. Govt Higher Secondary School 4. Library 5. Dental Clinic 6. Telephone Exchange 7. Village Office 8. PSU Bank (Central Bank of India) 9. Co-operative Banks. 10.Federal Bank

== Transport ==
Ezhumattoor is largely dependent on private buses. There are few KSRTC buses passing via Ezhumattoor. The nearest KSRTC bus terminus is in Mallappally. Auto rickshaws are available and generally hired for short distances (1–3 km) where bus service is non-existent or rare. Taxis and jeeps are other preferred modes of transport where the terrain is hilly or rugged.

The nearest railway stations are at Thiruvalla and Changanacherry and Chengannur.

Trivandrum International Airport and Cochin International Airport, at Nedumbassery, Kochi are the airports most conveniently used to fly there.

== Civic administration ==
Ezhumattoor Village is a part of Pathanamthitta district administration. The Ezhumattoor village office is in Hospital Junction and Panchayath office is in Tellioor. Ezhumattoor is famous for stone quarries, The blue stone from Ezhumattoor is mostly used for Construction of Temples, Homes etc. This place is also well known for the Traditional Ritual art Padayani, Which is performing here yearly during Vishu season at the famous Devi Temple at Panamattathukavu.

State code 32 District code 599 Sub District Code 05680 Village Code (2011) 628308
