= Chenneerkara =

- village
- Location in Kerala, India Chenneerkara (India)
- Coordinates: 9.2487300°N 76.7247600°E
- Country: India
- State: Kerala
- District: Pathanamthitta

Government
  - Body: Chenneerkkara Panchayath

Population (2011)
  - Total: 19,124

Languages
  - Official: Malayalam, English
- Time zone: UTC+5:30 (IST)
- PIN: 689503
- Vehicle registration: KL-3
- Nearest cities: Pandalam and Pathanamthitta
- Civic Agency: Chenneerkkara Panchayath
- Legislative Constituency: Pathanamthitta
- Lok Sabha Constituency: Pathanamthitta

Chenneerkara is a village in Pathanamthitta district in the state of Kerala, India. The majority of its inhabitants are from Hindu and Christian backgrounds. The primary crops are rubber, coconut, black pepper, and plantain. Chenneerkara is 10 km from Pathanamthitta and 7.5 km from Pandalam.

== Demographics ==
As of 2011 India census, Chenneerkara had a population of 19,124 with 8,882 males and 10,242 females.

== Educational Institutions ==
- Government Higher Secondary School, Thumpamon North
- SNDP Higher Secondary School
- Shalom Public School
- Government ITI, Chenneerkara
- Kendriya Vidyalaya Chenneerkara
- Marthoma Lower Primary School, Chenneerkara

Govt UPS Erathumpamon

== Religious Centres ==
- Manjinikkara Dayara - Pilgrim Centre
- St.Marys Kadheeshtha Orthodox Church, Thumpamon North
- Sree Vadakkumnadha Temple, Ambalakkadav
- Bhagavathy Kshethram Chenneerkara, Murippara
- Bethel Marthoma Church, Thumpamon North
- Mathoorkavu Bhagavathi Kshethram
- St. Mary's Catholic Church, Thumpamon North
- Sree Narayana Giri Mahadeva Kshethram
- St, Thomas CSI Church
- Valiyatharayil Siva Kshethram
- Ebenezer Mar Thoma Church
- Indian Pentecostal Church of God
- Church of God (full Gospel) in India
- The Pentecostal Mission
- St. George Orthodox Church, Mathoor
- Mar Barsouma Orthodox Church, Panackal
- St. George Orthodox Church, Oonnukal
- Little Flower Catholic Church, Oonnukal
- St. Marys Orthodox Church, Prakkanam
- St. Mary's Orthodox Church, Thottupuram
- St. Paul's CSI Church, Nallanikunnu
- St. Johns CSI Church, Erathumpamon
