= Mallappuzhassery =

- village
- Location in Kerala, India Mallappuzhassery (India)
- Coordinates: 9°19′0″N 76°41′0″E
- Country: India
- State: Kerala
- District: Pathanamthitta

Population (2011)
  - Total: 11,784

Languages
  - Official: Malayalam, English
- Time zone: UTC+5:30 (IST)
- Vehicle registration: KL-

Mallappuzhassery is a village situated in Kozhencherry taluk of Pathanamthitta district in Kerala, India. Its border starts in the middle of the temple grounds running north–south: the eastern part is Mallappuzhassery and the western part is Edasserimala. Edasserimala is part of Aranmula Panchayath and Mallappuzhassery is of Mallappuzhassery Panchayath. The northern border of the village is the Pamba River.

== Demographics ==
At the 2011 India census, Mallapuzhassery had a population of 11,784 with 5,503 males and 6,281 females.

== See also ==
- Aranmula kottaram
- Pathanamthitta
