= Kallooppara =

Village in Pathanamthitta, Kerala, India

- Village
- Location in Kerala, India Kallooppara (India)
- Coordinates: 9.415025°N 76.635475°E
- Country: India
- State: Kerala
- District: Pathanamthitta

Population (2011)
  - Total: 16,837
- Time zone: UTC+5:30 (IST)
- Postal code: 689583
- Vehicle registration: KL-28 (Mallappally)

Kallooppara is a village located in Kallooppara Gram Panchayat, within Mallapally Taluk in Pathanamthitta district, Kerala state, India. As of the 2011 census, it had a population of 16,837.

== History ==
The land of Kallooppara was previously known as "Perum Para Nadu" because of its large number of rocks. Later, the region was renamed Perumbranadu.

== Demographics ==
According to the 2011 Indian census, Kallooppara had a population of 16,837. The literacy rate was 97.81%.
