= Angadickal =

Angadical
- village
- Nickname: Angadical North
- Location in Kerala, India Angadical (India)
- Coordinates: 9.2063300°N 76.7835460°E
- Country: India
- State: Kerala
- District: Pathanamthitta
- Named for: Maha Vishnu temple

Population (2011)
  - Total: 11,934

Languages
  - Official: Malayalam, English
- Time zone: UTC+5:30 (IST)
- PIN: 689648
- Vehicle registration: KL-26

Angadical is a village in Pathanamthitta district in the Indian state of Kerala.

== Demographics ==
As of 2011 Indian census, Angadical had a population of 11,934 with 5,429 males and 6,505 females.
