= Thelliyoor =

- Census village
- Country: India
- State: Kerala
- District: Pathanamthitta

Population (2011)
  - Total: 8,101
- Time zone: UTC+5:30 (IST)
- PIN: 689544
- Vehicle registration: KL-28 (Mallappally)

Thelliyoor is a census village in Ezhumattoor gram panchayat in the Mallapally taluk of the district of Pathanamthitta in Kerala. As of 2011, it had a population of 8,101.

== Demographics ==
As per the 2011 Indian census, Thelliyoor has a population of 8,101. It has a sex ratio of 1144 females per 1000 males. Children below 6 years of age constitute 8.17% of the total population. Scheduled Castes and Scheduled Tribes constitute 6.75% and 0.31% of the population respectively. The total literacy rate was 98.21% (98.41% for males and 98.04% for females), which is higher than the state average of 94% and the national average of 74.04%.
