= Kummannoor =

Village in Pathanamthitta District, Kerala, India

Kummannoor is a small village in the Kottayam district, located 7 km from Pala and 22 km from district headquarters.

== Location ==
Kummannoor is located near the Kidangoor Town and the main attraction is the Meenachil River.

== Airport ==
The nearest airport is the Cochin International airport which is 80 km away.

== Access ==
The nearest bus stations are in Pala and Ettumanoor. You can take a bus from Pala to Kummannoor. There are many private buses & KSRTC Buses available to Kummannoor.
