= Vallicode-Kottayam =

Vallicode-Kottayam V.Kottayam
- village
- Location in Kerala, India Vallicode-Kottayam (India)
- Coordinates: 9°12′30″N 76°49′0″E
- Country: India
- State: Kerala
- District: Pathanamthitta

Population (2011)
  - Total: 11,762

Languages
  - Official: Malayalam, English
- Time zone: UTC+5:30 (IST)
- PIN: 689656
- Vehicle registration: KL- 83

Vallicode-Kottayam is a village in Pathanamthitta district in the state of Kerala, India. Vallicode-Kottayam village is a part of Konni Taluk, Pathanamthitta District of Kerala State, India.

Vallicode Kottayam is a village located within the Pramadom Grama Panchayat. This village falls under the Konni assembly constituency and the Pathanamthitta parliamentary constituency. The nearest town for significant economic activities is Pathanamthitta, situated approximately 9 kilometers from Vallicode Kottayam. The village is commonly referred to as V. Kottayam.

Nedumpara Viewpoint serves as the primary tourist destination in Kottappara, located centrally within Vallicode-Kottayam. Visitors can drive to the summit of the hill, where parking is available, allowing them to enjoy the panoramic views. The Konni Eco Tourism Elephant Park is situated 7 kilometers away. Opposite Kottappara lies Thudiyurulippara, another hill station, which features the Hanuman Temple at its peak. During the rainy season, a slender waterfall can be observed near the village office.

A natural canal known as 'valiya thode' originates from this area, directing water towards the Achen Covil River, with paddy fields lining its banks. The village is home to several significant ponds, including Pulinilkunnethil Kulam, Nenthrappallil Kulam, and Ambalakkulam. The Kodumon Plantation, managed by the plantation corporation, encompasses a large portion of Ezhumon and Aazhakkoottam, primarily dedicated to rubber cultivation.

Key Hindu temples in the vicinity include Malikappurathu Bhagavathi Temple, Komban Paramala Temple, Chavarukavu Temple, Thudiyurulippara Temple, Gurumandiram – SNDP School Junction, Gurumandiram – Near Kolappara Junction, and Attuvasseril Temple. Additionally, Christian churches are located in Elappupara, Thattakkunnu Junction Ezhumon, and Anthichantha.

The main banking institutions include Kerala Gramin Bank and Janatha Service Co-operative Bank, with an SBI ATM located at Chavarukavu Junction and two non-banking financial companies operating in the area. A government primary health clinic operates during the day near Kottappara Junction, and a post office with basic services is available near the market junction.Three libraries, namely Janatha, Progressive, and Vinjanaposhini, are engaged in cultural activities in addition to providing reading facilities. Enjayes Spices is a prominent spice extraction company situated near Anthichantha.

Mobile networks such as BSNL, Vodafone, and Jio have extensive coverage throughout the area. Tea shops and auto rickshaws are readily available at all major junctions. The nearby town of Poomkavu offers amenities including a petrol pump, ATMs, and restaurants, located just 4 kilometers from Kottappara Junction. Private bus services operate from Pathanamthitta and Konni throughout the day, providing access to the area.

NSS High School Vallicode Kottayam

== Geography ==
The total geographical area of the village is 1984 hectares. Vallicode Kottayam has a total population of 11,762 people. There are about 3,258 houses in V Kottayam village. As per 2019 stats, V Kottayam villages comes under Konni assembly & Pathanamthitta parliamentary constituency. Pathanamthitta is the nearest town to V Kottayam which is approximately 9 km (about 5.6 mi) away.

== Demographics ==
As of 2011 India census, Vallicode-Kottayam had a population of 11762 with 5440 males and 6322 females.

== Education ==
There are three aided schools located in Vallicode Kottayam. The Government Lower Primary School, established in 1913, offers classes from 1 to 4 following the Kerala syllabus. The SNDP Upper Primary School provides education for grades 1 through 7, while the NSS High School, which has been in operation for 70 years, serves students in classes 5 to 10.

== Tourist Attractions ==
Vallicode Kottayam is known for its hill stations. The name Kottayam comes from the mountainous terrain, signifying a natural fortress. The villages possesses abundant greenery, and hilly landscapes, along with the diverse flora and fauna.

Nedumpara Viewpoint stands out as the main attraction in Kottappara, situated centrally within Vallicode-Kottayam. Visitors have the opportunity to drive to the hilltop, where parking facilities are provided, enabling them to take in the breathtaking panoramic vistas. Across from Kottappara is Thudiyurulippara, another hill station that boasts the Hanuman Temple at its summit. During the monsoon season, a delicate waterfall can be seen near the mountain adjacent to the village office at Elappupara.

A natural canal, referred to as 'valiya thode,' originates from this region, channeling water towards the Achen Covil River, with lush paddy fields adorning its banks. The village is also home to several notable ponds, including Pulinilkunnethil Kulam, Nenthrappallil Kulam, and Ambalakkulam.

== Places for Worship ==
Key Hindu temples in the vicinity include Malikappurathu Bhagavathi Temple, Komban Paramala Temple, Chavarukavu Temple, Thudiyurulippara Temple, Gurumandiram – SNDP School Junction, Gurumandiram – Near Kolappara Junction, and Attuvasseril Temple. Additionally, Christian churches – St. Thomas Malankara Syrian Catholic Church, St. Mary's Jacobite Syrian Orthodox cathedral are at Anthichantha and St. George Orthodox Church at Thattakkunnu, St. George Malankara Church at Elappupara, St. George Church at Ezhumon, Ebenezar Marthoma Church at Manalepadi.

The Kumbha Karthika Mahothsavam, celebrated on the Karthika day of the 'kumbham' month in the Malayalam calendar, is the principal festival at Malikappurathu Bhagavathi Temple. Most of Churches festivals are in April – May months. Festival at Gurumandiram Near to SNDP school is on December 22 and the festival at Gurumandiram Near Kolappara is on January 23 every year. Sivarathri festival is conducting every year at Thudiyurulippara Hanuman Temple.
