= Perumpetty =

- Census village
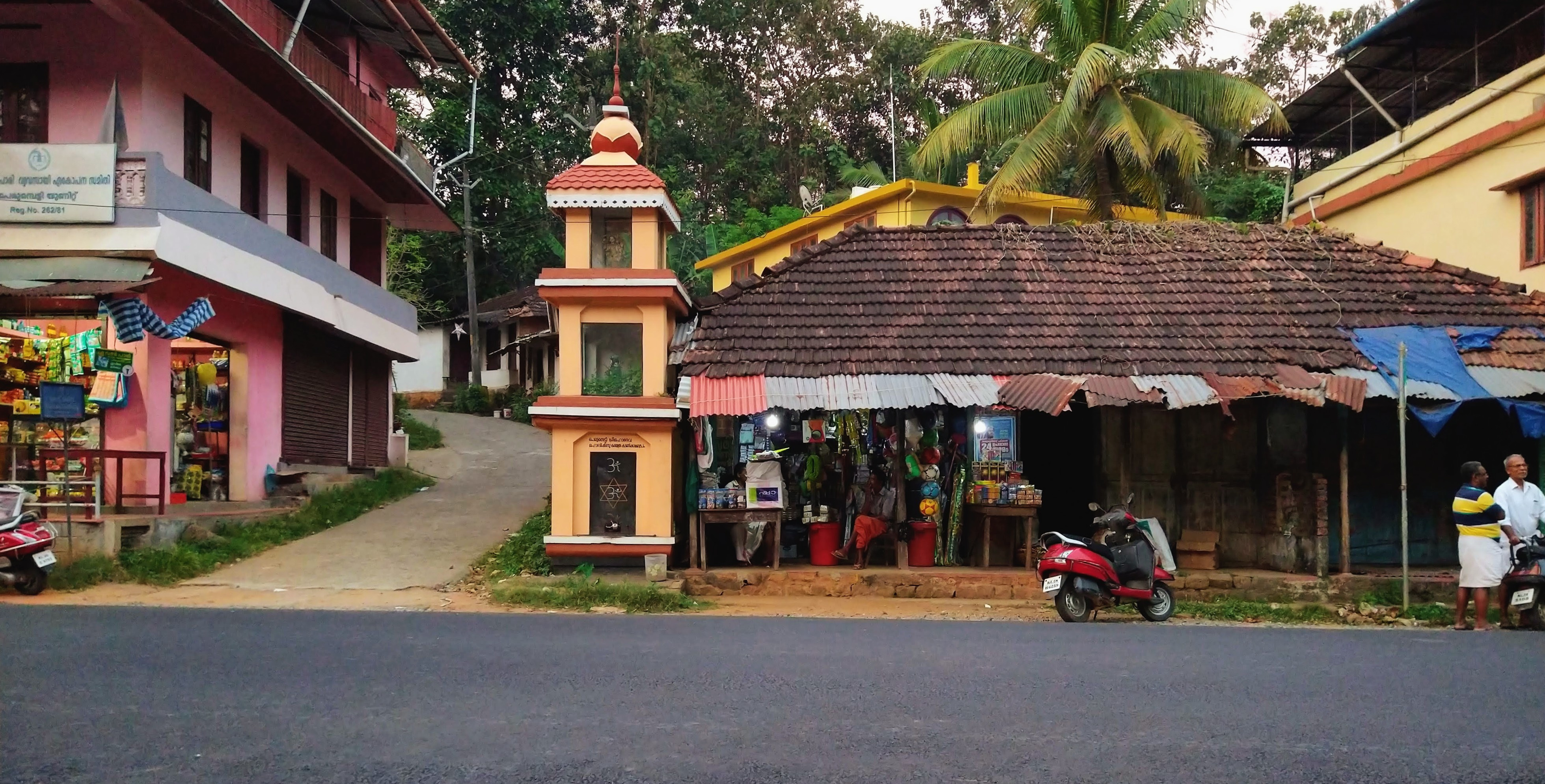
- Perumpetty in 2023

- Location in Kerala, India Perumpetty (India)
- Coordinates: 9°25′50″N 76°44′25″E
- Country: India
- State: Kerala
- District: Pathanamthitta

Population (2011)
  - Total: 14,396
- Time zone: UTC+5:30 (IST)
- PIN: 689592
- Vehicle registration: KL-28 (Mallappally)
- Website: https://village.kerala.gov.in/Office_websites/about_village.php?nm=13541354Perumpettyvillageoffice

Perumpetty is a census village in Kottanad gram panchayat in the Mallapally taluk of the district of Pathanamthitta in Kerala. As of 2011, it had a population of 14,396.

== Demographics ==
As per the 2011 Indian census, Perumpetty has a population of 14,396. It has a sex ratio of 1099 females per 1000 males. Children below 6 years of age constitute 8.15% of the total population. Scheduled Castes and Scheduled Tribes constitute 12.27% and 0.26% of the population respectively. The total literacy rate was 97.48% (97.63% for males and 97.35% for females), which is higher than the state average of 94% and the national average of 74.04%.
