= Kurampala =

- village
- Country: India
- State: Kerala
- District: Pathanamthitta

Population (2011)
  - Total: 20,822

Languages
  - Official: Malayalam, English
- Time zone: UTC+5:30 (IST)
- PIN: 689501
- Vehicle registration: KL-26

Kurampala is a village in Pandalam in the state of Kerala, India.

== Demographics ==
Kurampala is in the suburbs of Pandalam town in Kerala. As of 2011 India census, Kurampala had a population of 20,822 with 9,641 males and 11,181 females.
