= Pazhakulam =

- Town
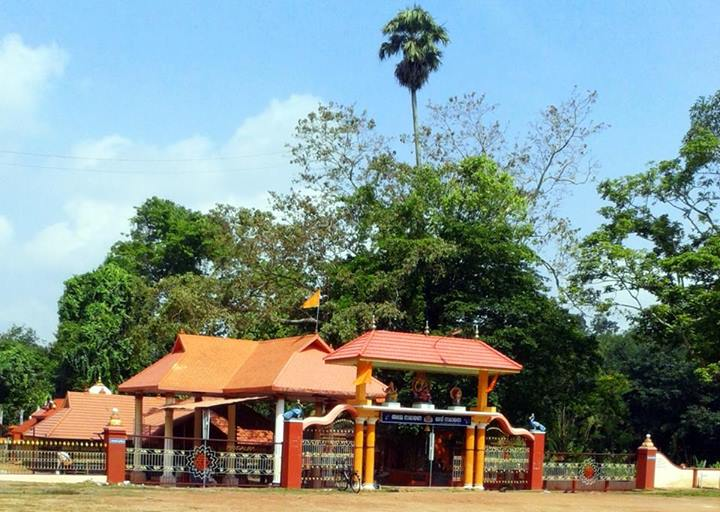
- Punthalaveettil Temple
- Country: India
- State: Kerala
- District: Pathanamthitta

Languages
  - Official: Malayalam
- Time zone: UTC+5:30 (IST)
- Vehicle registration: KL-26 (Adoor Sub RTO)

Pazhakulam is a town in Pathanamthitta district in Kerala, India. This village comes under Adoor taluk.

== Location ==
Pazhakulam is located near Adoor town in Pathanamthitta district. Nearby villages are Erathu, Pandalam Thekkekara, Kadampanadu, Palamel, Pandalam municipality and Adoor municipality. Noorul Huda Juma Masjid Pazhakulam, Pazhakulam Punthalaveetil temple, Thengumthara Uma Maheshwara temple, St. Gregorieos Orthodox Church, Thiruhridaya Catholic Church, St. Mathews Malankara Catholic Church are the major religious institutions. Govt. I.P.S. Pazhakulam, St. Stephens English Medium School are the major educational institutions. BSNL telephone exchange is situated in Thengumthara junction. The Life Line hospital is 1.5 km away from Pazhakulam.

== Churches ==
The town is famous for Mar Gregorios Orthodox Church of the Malankara Orthodox Syrian Church's Adoor-Kadampanad Diocese. Mar Gregorios Church was named by Baselios Marthoma Mathews II Bava.

- Assemblies of God in India
- India Pentecostal Church of God
- ST MATHEWS MALANKARA CATHOLIC CHURCH

== Mosque ==
Pazhakulam Noorul Huda Muslim Jamath

== Temples ==
1. Pazhakulam Punthalaveetil Temple(http://www.pazhakulampunthalaveetilamma.blogspot.com)
2. Thengumthara Uma Maheshwara temple.(https://www.facebook.com/profile.php?id=61555823758019

== Schools ==
- St.Stephens. school Pazhakulam
- Pazhakulam Government LP School
