= Puramattam =

Puramattom
- Census village
- Country: India
- State: Kerala
- District: Pathanamthitta

Population (2011)
  - Total: 14,069

Languages
  - Official: Malayalam, English
- Time zone: UTC+5:30 (IST)
- PIN: 689543
- Vehicle registration: KL-28 (Mallappally)

Puramattom is a census village in Puramattom Gram Panchayat in the Mallapally taluk, Thiruvalla Revenue Division of the district of Pathanamthitta in Kerala.It is part of Thiruvalla Constituency .As of 2011, it had a population of 14,069. The otherwise nondescript village is now popular due to Kailash (actor) being born there.

== Demographics ==
As per the 2011 Indian census, Puramattom has a population of 14,069. It has a sex ratio of 1112 females per 1000 males. Children below 6 years of age constitute 7.63% of the total population. Scheduled Castes and Scheduled Tribes constitute 12.87% and 0.16% of the population respectively. The total literacy rate was 97.55% (98.22% for males and 96.94% for females), which is higher than the state average of 94% and the national average of 74.04%.
