= List of Regional Transport Office districts in Kerala =

Motor Vehicles Department in Kerala

== Administration ==
There are 18 Regional Transport Offices (RTOs) in Kerala, each headed by a Regional Transport Officer, and 69 Sub-Regional Transport Offices (SRTOs), each headed by a Joint Regional Transport Officer (JRTO). In addition, there are 14 Enforcement RTOs responsible for enforcing the Motor Vehicles Act and Rules, as well as overseeing road safety enforcement and related duties.

== Regional Transport Offices ==
No	RT Office	Year	Taluk	Current Running Series (as of October-2026)
KL-01	Trivandrum	1989	Thiruvananthapuram	DM
KL-02	Kollam	1989	Kollam	CD
KL-03	Pathanamthitta	1989	Kozhencherry	AK
KL-04	Alappuzha	1989	Ambalappuzha	AY
KL-05	Kottayam	1989	Kottayam	BG
KL-06	Idukki	1989	Idukki	M
KL-07	Ernakulam	1989	Kanayannur	DL
KL-08	Thrissur	1989	Thrissur	CH
KL-09	Palakkad	1989	Palakkad	BB
KL-10	Malappuram	1989	Eranad	BN
KL- 11	Kozhikode	1989	Kozhikode	CG
KL-12	Wayanad	1989	Vythiri	R
KL-13	Kannur	1989	Kannur	BD
KL-14	Kasaragod	1989	Kasaragod, Manjeshwar	AK
KL-16	Attingal	2002	Chirayinkeezhu	AE
KL-17	Muvattupuzha	2002	Muvattupuzha	AB
KL-18	Vadakara	2002	Vatakara	AK
KL-15	Registered in Thiruvananthapuram for KSRTC	1989	Thiruvananthapuram	A
KL-90	Registered in Thiruvananthapuram for Government Vehicles (Note: KL-90 (Nationalised sector II) in Thiruvananthapuram is reserved for government vehicles: A–State, B–Central, C–Local bodies, D–PSUs.)	2023	Thiruvananthapuram	

== Sub Regional Transport Offices ==
No	SRT Office	Year	Taluk	Revenue District	Current Running Series (as of October-2026)
KL-19	Parassala	2006	Neyyattinkara	Thiruvananthapuram	R
KL-20	Neyyattinkara	2006	Neyyattinkara	Thiruvananthapuram	V
KL-21	Nedumangad	2006	Nedumangad	Thiruvananthapuram	AC
KL-22	Kazhakoottam	2006	Thiruvananthapuram	Thiruvananthapuram	V
KL-23	Karunagappalli	2006	Karunagappalli	Kollam	AA
KL-24	Kottarakkara	2006	Kottarakkara	Kollam	Y
KL-25	Punalur	2006	Punalur	Kollam	S
KL-26	Adoor	2006	Adoor	Pathanamthitta	R
KL-27	Thiruvalla	2006	Thiruvalla	Pathanamthitta	P
KL-28	Mallappally	2006	Mallappally	Pathanamthitta	G
KL-29	Kayamkulam	2006	Karthikappally	Alappuzha	Z
KL-30	Chengannur	2006	Chengannur	Alappuzha	M
KL-31	Mavelikkara	2006	Mavelikkara	Alappuzha	V
KL-32	Cherthala	2006	Cherthala	Alappuzha	Y
KL-33	Changanassery	2006	Changanassery	Kottayam	T
KL-34	Kanjirappally	2006	Kanjirappally	Kottayam	K
KL-35	Pala	2006	Meenachil	Kottayam	P
KL-36	Vaikom	2006	Vaikom	Kottayam	M
KL-37	Vandiperiyar	2006	Peerumed	Idukki	G
KL-38	Thodupuzha	2006	Thodupuzha	Idukki	N
KL-39	Thripunithura	2006	Kanayannur	Ernakulam	X
KL-40	Perumbavoor	2006	Kunnathunad	Ernakulam	Y
KL-41	Aluva	2006	Aluva	Ernakulam	Y
KL-42	North Paravur	2006	North Paravur, Kochi	Ernakulam	Z
KL-43	Mattancherry	2006	Kochi	Ernakulam	T
KL-44	Kothamangalam	2006	Kothamangalam	Ernakulam	K
KL-45	Irinjalakuda	2006	Mukundapuram, Chalakkudy	Thrissur	AA
KL-46	Guruvayur	2006	Chavakkad	Thrissur	AC
KL-47	Kodungalloor	2006	Kodungalloor	Thrissur	P
KL-48	Wadakkanchery	2006	Thalappilly, Kunnamkulam	Thrissur	W
KL-49	Alathur	2006	Alathur	Palakkad	R
KL-50	Mannarkkad	2006	Mannarkkad	Palakkad	M
KL-51	Ottappalam	2006	Ottappalam	Palakkad	S
KL-52	Pattambi	2006	Pattambi	Palakkad	X
KL-53	Perinthalmanna	2006	Perinthalmanna	Malappuram	Y
KL-54	Ponnani	2006	Ponnani	Malappuram	S
KL-55	Tirur	2006	Tirur	Malappuram	AQ
KL-56	Koyilandy	2006	Koyilandy	Kozhikode	AB
KL-57	Koduvally	2006	Thamarassery	Kozhikode	AF
KL-58	Thalassery	2006	Thalassery	Kannur	AQ
KL-59	Taliparamba	2006	Taliparamba	Kannur	AE
KL-60	Kanhangad	2006	Hosdurg	Kasargod	Z
KL-61	Kunnathur	2011	Kunnathur	Kollam	J
KL-62	Ranni	2011	Ranni	Pathanamthitta	H
KL-63	Angamaly	2011	Aluva	Ernakulam	L
KL-64	Chalakkudy	2011	Chalakkudy	Thrissur	P
KL-65	Tirurangadi	2011	Tirurangadi	Malappuram	Z
KL-66	Kuttanad	2013	Kuttanad	Alappuzha	E
KL-67	Uzhavoor	2013	Meenachil, Vaikom	Kottayam	E
KL-68	Devikulam	2013	Devikulam	Idukki	C
KL-69	Udumbanchola	2013	Udumbanchola	Idukki	E
KL-70	Chittur	2013	Chittur	Palakkad	J
KL-71	Nilambur	2013	Nilambur	Malappuram	P
KL-72	Mananthavady	2013	Mananthavady	Wayanad	F
KL-73	Sulthan Bathery	2013	Sulthan Bathery	Wayanad	G
KL-74	Kattakkada	2018	Kattakkada	Thiruvananthapuram	G
KL-75	Thriprayar	2018	Chavakkad	Thrissur	F
KL-76	Nanmanda	2018	Koyilandy, Kozhikode	Kozhikode	H
KL-77	Perambra	2018	Koyilandy, Vatakara	Kozhikode	F
KL-78	Iritty	2018	Iritty	Kannur	F
KL-79	Vellarikundu	2018	Vellarikundu	Kasargod	B
KL-80	Pathanapuram	2020	Pathanapuram	Kollam	B
KL-81	Varkala	2020	Varkala	Thiruvananthapuram	D
KL-82	Chadayamangalam	2020	Kottarakkara	Kollam	B
KL-83	Konni	2020	Konni	Pathanamthitta	C
KL-84	Kondotty	2020	Kondotty	Malappuram	G
KL-85	Ramanattukara (Feroke)	2020	Kozhikode	Kozhikode	F
KL-86	Payyannur	2020	Payyannur	Kannur	E
KL-99	Government of Kerala	2027	Kerala	Kerala	

== Old Vehicle Registration code (Prior to 1989) ==
Name of RTO	Registration code(s)
Thiruvananthapuram	KLT, KLV, KRT, KRV, KET, KEV, KBT, KBV, KCT, KCV
Kollam	KLQ, KLU, KRQ, KRU, KEQ
Pathanamthitta	KLB, KRB
Alappuzha	KLA, KLY, KRA, KRY
Kottayam	KLK, KLO, KRK, KRO, KEK, KEO
Idukki	KLI
Ernakulam	KLE, KLF, KRE, KRF, KEE, KEF, KBE, KBF, KCE, KCF, KDE
Thrissur	KLR, KLH, KRR, KRH, KER, KEH, KBR
Palakkad	KLP, KLG, KRP, KRG
Malappuram	KLM, KLL, KRM
Kozhikode	KLD, KLZ, KRD, KRZ, KED, KEZ
Wayanad	KLW
Kannur	KLC, KLN, KRC, KRN
Kasaragod	KLS
KSRTC	KLX

== Future Sub Regional Transport Offices ==
Government of Kerala has repeatedly intimated multiple legislative members that there are no plans to setup any new RTOs/SRTOs in Kerala unless the financial condition of Kerala improves.
