= Muthoot Pappachan Group =

Indian financial services conglomerate

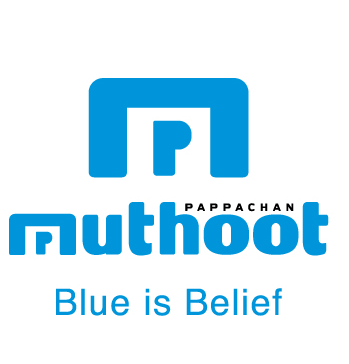
- Company type: Conglomerate
- Industry: Financial services; Real estate and infrastructure; Automotive; IT services; Precious metal; Alternate energy; Security services
- Founded: 1887; 139 years ago
- Headquarters: Thiruvananthapuram, Kerala, India
- Area served: India
- Key people: Ninan Mathai Muthoot (Patron founder); Muthoot Pappachan (Founder); Thomas John Muthoot (Chairman & MD); Thomas George Muthoot (Promoter – director); Thomas Muthoot (Promoter - director)
- Number of employees: 26,000
- Subsidiaries: Muthoot Capital Services; Muthoot Exim; Muthoot FinCorp; Muthoot Microfin; Muthoot Housing Finance
- Website: www.muthoot.com

Muthoot Pappachan Group, also known as Muthoot Blue, is an Indian financial service conglomerate founded in 1887 by Ninan Mathai Muthoot. Headquartered in Thiruvananthapuram, Kerala, the group has a workforce of more than 26,000 employees across 4,200 branches in India. Apart from financial services, the group has business interests in hospitality, automotive dealerships, real estate, healthcare, IT services, precious metals, alternate energy, and security services.

== History ==
The family business was founded in 1887 by M. N. Mathai Muthoot in Kozhencherry, Kerala. Mathai initially traded in timber and food grains, supplying rations to large British-run plantations.

In 1939, the group established banking and finance services to provide immediate financial assistance to customers in rural and non-rural areas through easy secured loans. Post-independence, the demand for credit increased as individuals discovered their household gold as a safe and convenient means to get credit. Mathai then moved into the gold loan business.

In 1979, the business was split among the founder's three surviving sons. The eldest son, M. George Muthoot, moved out of Kerala and set up Muthoot Finance. The youngest son, M. Thomas Muthoot, also known as Muthoot Pappachan, then incorporated Muthoot Pappachan Group. The group is currently under his three sons T. John Muthoot, T. George Muthoot and T. Thomas Muthoot (known as just Thomas Muthoot).

In May 2024, the group signed Shah Rukh Khan as a brand ambassador.

== See also ==
- Muthoot Football Academy
