= George Muthoot =

George Muthoot may refer to:

- M. G. George Muthoot, Indian entrepreneur and businessman
- George Alexander Muthoot, Indian entrepreneur and businessman
