= St. Mary's Girls High School, Kozhencherry =

Location
- Kerala; India
- 9.3410°N 76.7095°E

St. Mary's Girls High School is a sister school of St. Thomas Higher Secondary School, Kozhencherry in Kerala, the South Western state in India. It is located at Keezhukara, and is about a kilometer from the Kozhencherry town centre.

== History ==
It is the far sightedness of some of the leaders in Kozhencherry, that made it a 100% literate town in Kerala.

An English Medium School was opened in Kozhencherry by the Kottayam (Anglican) Mission in 1822 with 40 students and two teachers. In 1904 the St. Thomas Mar Thoma parish took over the responsibility of running the school and named it St. Thomas school. By 1910, The Travancore Education Code of 1085 M.E. (1910) came into force and St. Thomas school was approved as a recognised Middle School (Form I, II and III).

Realising the necessity to educate girls, Kurumthottical Rev. K.T. Thomas built a Middle school (Form I to III) in 1930 for girls students only. Mrs Aley Eapen from Mavelikara was its headmistress.

In 1941 this girls school was approved as a High School (Form I to VI). When St.Mary’s Girls High School was opened and all the girls from St. Thomas High school were moved to the new school.

From 1941 to 1944 Mrs. Mariam Thomas was the headmistress. She was followed by Mrs. Aleyamma Cherian, Mr. K.C. Varghese, Miss Rahel Mathen, Miss M.G. Aleyamma, Miss Accamma Varghese, Miss Chachi Chacko. They were headmistresses till 1951. Miss Rachel K. Thomas, daughter of Kurumthottical Rev. K.T. Thomas was the headmistress from 1951-’78. Her successors were Mrs. Saramma C Thomas (1978-’82), Mr. Thomas Mathew (1982-’83), Mrs. M.V. Sosamma (1983-’85), Mrs. Mrs. Aleyamma Samuel (1983 - ) and so on.

== Courses offered ==
The school now offers the following courses (following Kerala Government Syllabus)

Upper Primary –
High School –

== Management ==
This school is managed by St. Thomas Marthoma Church, Kozhencherry. The vicar is the ex-officio Manager of the school.

=== Managers ===
Rev. K.T. Thomas, Kurumthottickal (1941-‘55), Rev. K.J. Philip (1956-’59), Rev. K.C. Thomas (1960-‘61), Rev. C.G. Alexander (1961-’62), Rev. C.G. David (1963-’66), Rev. K.C. George (1966-’67), Rev. C.G. Alexander (1967-’72), Rev. P.M. George (1973-’77), Rev. Oommen Koruthu (1977-’80), Rev. Dr. V.P. Thomas (1980-’82), Rev. M.O. Ommen (1983-’84), Rev. M.C. Mani (1984-’88), Rev. P.V. George (1988-’91), Rev. P.V. Thomas (1991-’95), Rev. Dr. P.P. Abraham (1995-’96), Rev. D. Philip (1996–2001), Rev. P.T. Thomas (2001-’06), Rev. Philip Varghese (2006-’09), Very Rev. K.M. Mammen (2009-2013), Rev. Roy Thomas (May 2013 - ).
