= Vellaramkunnu =

- village
- Location in Kerala, India Vellaramkunnu (India)
- Coordinates: 9.6449600°N 77.1454400°E
- Country: India
- State: Kerala
- District: Idukki

Population (2001)
  - Total: 6,870

Languages
  - Official: Malayalam, English
- Time zone: UTC+5:30 (IST)
- Vehicle registration: KL-37

Vellaramkunnu is a village 10 km (6 mi) from Thekkady, Kerala, India.

== Economy ==
The majority of residents are farmers, growing crops such as cardamom, pepper, coffee and tea.

== Education ==
St Marys HSS is the regional school.

== History ==
The old name of this village was Moongithozhu as evident from the veterinary dispensary situated in this place, known as veterinary dispensary, Moongithozhu.

== Suburbs ==
Vellaramkunnu serves as a hub for the nearby villages Pathumury, Dymock, Anakkuzhy, Chenkara, and Moonkilar.
