= The Muthoot Group =

Indian financial services conglomerate

- Type: Conglomerate
- Industry: Finance; Hospitality; Broadcast media Healthcare; Education; Renewable energy Real estate Restaurant
- Founded: 1887
- Headquarters: Kochi, Kerala, India
- Key people: George Alexander Muthoot (MD); George Jacob Muthoot (director); George Thomas Muthoot (director)
- Revenue: ▲₹62.43 billion (US$650 million) (2018)
- Number of employees: 30,000+ (2017)
- Website: www.muthootgroup.com

The Muthoot Group is an Indian multinational conglomerate headquartered in Kochi, Kerala. It has interests in financial services, information technology, media, healthcare, education, power generation, infrastructure, plantations, precious metal, restaurant, and hospitality. Muthoot Group operates in 29 states in India, and has presence in Nepal, Sri Lanka, US, UK and UAE. The group manages assets of over $7.5 billion. It is owned and managed by the Muthoot family.

The group takes its name from the Muthoot Family based in Kerala. The company was set up by M. N. Mathai (who goes by N. Mathai Muthoot) in 1887 at Kozhencherry, a small town in the Kerala. It was then later taken over by his son M George Muthoot, who incorporated the finance division of the group, which was until then primarily involved in wholesale of grains and timber. The company is now managed by the third and fourth generation of its family members.

== History ==
In 1939, M. George Muthoot created a partnership firm under the name of Muthoot M. George & Brothers (MMG). MMG was a chit fund based out of Kozhencherry. In 1971, the firm was renamed as Muthoot Bankers, and started to finance loans using gold jewellery as collateral. In 2001, the company was renamed to Muthoot Finance. Muthoot Finance falls under the category of systematically important non-banking financial company(NBFC) of the RBI guidelines.

The company has more than 4,500 branches spread across 29 states and union territories of India. Muthoot Finance, according to the IMaCS Research & Analytics Industry Reports [Gold Loans Market in India, 2009 and the 2010 update to the IMaCS Industry Report 2009], is the largest Gold Loan NBFC and has the largest network of branches for a gold loan NBFC in India. Muthoot Finance is also the highest-credit-rated gold loan company in India, with a credit rating of AA (CRISIL) and AA (ICRA) for its long-term debts and P1+ (CRISIL) & A1+ (ICRA) for its Short Term Debt Instruments.

Muthoot Finance has played an instrumental role in organizing and professionalizing gold collateralized loans in India, a concept which emphasizes mobilising household gold jewelry as a channel of credit to borrowers. The total gold holdings among individuals is estimated to be more than 20,000 tonnes.

In 2010, Muthoot Finance sold 4% of its shares in a private equity round to Barings Bank and Matrix Partners, raising ₹157 crore (US$34.33 million). Later in 2011, Muthoot Finance publicly listed its shares on the two biggest stock exchanges in India National Stock Exchange of India and Bombay Stock Exchange. In terms of market capitalisation, Muthoot Finance Ltd is the second largest company in Kerala, first being Federal Bank.

== Business sectors ==
=== Retail gold banking ===
Muthoot started offering loans backed by gold jewellery as collateral in 1971. As of 2009, it was the largest non-banking financial company issuing gold-backed loans.

=== Affordable housing finance ===
Incorporated in 2013, Muthoot Homefin (India) Limited is a Housing Finance company (HFC) registered with the National Housing Bank. The company has its Corporate Office in Mumbai, and operates primarily in the Western and Central states of India. In an effort to promote the Indian government's initiative of Housing for All, Muthoot Homefin operates primarily in the affordable housing segment, wherein the loans are below ₹30 lakh (US$31,000). Muthoot Homefin has a long-term credit rating of AA− (ICRA) and a short-term rating of P1+ (ICRA)

=== Other financial products ===
The securities brokerage business of the group is undertaken through the subsidiary Muthoot Securities. It operates over 65 business centres in Kerala, Tamil Nadu, Andhra Pradesh and Karnataka. The company offers Equity & Currency trading, Online trading, Portfolio Management Services, Depository services, Mutual funds, PAN card services and Market Research. Muthoot Precious Metals Corporation (MPMC) was established in May 2006, the company sells coins & bars of 999 Pure 24 Carat gold and silver throughout India. They carry out the sales of these bars and coins through more than 4250 branches of Muthoot Finance. MPMC imports gold bullion from Switzerland and converts them into gold coins of smaller denominations so as to suit the investment requirements of people from different income groups.

The group provides wire transfer services through the branch network of Muthoot Finance since 2002. As of December 2012, there are 7 inward remittances that Muthoot Finance offers Western Union, Xpress Money, Instant Cash, Ez Remit, Transfast, MoneyGram, Global Money.

In 2013, the group also acquired a majority stake in an NBFC in Sri Lanka operating under the brand name of Asia Asset Finance Limited. Asia Asset Finance primarily provides loans to small businesses as well as Gold Loans. The group expanded its Gold Loan business to the UK, wherein it operates under the brand name Muthoot Finance UK. In 2014, the group also acquired a majority stake in a Microfinance company operating under the brand name Belstar Investments.

Incorporated in 1992, Muthoot Vehicle & Asset Finance is a public company engaged in providing vehicle loans. The company operates primarily in South India. The Reserve Bank of India classifies it as a Deposit taking Asset Finance Company.

The Wealth management services division of the group is associated with insurance ranging from life insurance to medical, ULIPs, etc. It was established in 2002. All operations are now run under the name of Muthoot Insurance Brokers Pvt. Ltd.

=== Media ===
Muthoot Group operates Chennai Live 104.8 Fm that focuses on the growing demand for urban English music. Established in 2006, Chennai Live is the first talk radio station in India and is the leading English radio channel in Chennai.

=== Healthcare ===
Muthoot Hospitals became operational in 1988 and currently operates under the brandname of Muthoot Healthcare. The group operates a chain of multi-speciality hospitals and a network of specialty clinics and diagnostic centres. It also provides several community health programmes that fall under the healthcare division of Muthoot Group. The group operates a specialised Cancer Research Centre in Kozhencherry, 2 multi-speciality hospitals in Kozhencherry and Pathanamthitta as well as Diagnostic Centres spread across the state of Kerala.

=== Travel and hospitality ===
The group manages four luxury hotels operating under the brand name of Xandari, in Thekkady, Marari Beach, Fort Kochi and Alajuela, Costa Rica. In addition the group also operates Pampa Villa and Kayal Villa two boutique hotels in Kerala, as well as 10 Kettuvallam's in Kerala which operate under the brand 'Xandari River Escapes'. Xandari River Escapes has been given a five star rating by Trip Advisor.

The group provides tours and travel services through the brand Travel Jango (earlier known as Travel Smart). The services offered by this division include international and domestic air ticketing, tour packages, passport services, emigration and visa services, travel insurance, bus ticketing and foreign exchange.

=== Housing and infrastructure ===
Muthoot Housing & Infrastructure, formerly known as Muthoot Builders, was established in 1990. The infrastructure division has residential and commercial projects in South India.

=== Education ===
The Muthoot Group owns and operates multiple educational institutions:

St George's School, New Delhi: It was founded in 1930. As of December 2012, the school has a staff strength of 130 teachers and student strength over 3000. The school operates under the Central Board of Secondary Education

Paul George Global School, New Delhi: Commenced operations in 2015. The school is recognized by the Central Board of Secondary Education

Sanskara School, Infopark, Kochi: Commenced operations in 2016. The school operates under the Central Board of Secondary Education

The Group also owns and operates higher education institutions like the Muthoot College of Allied Health Sciences, Kozhencherry which was established in 2004 and offers major health courses like MLT, MIT etc.

As well as The Muthoot Institute of Science & Technology, Kochi which commenced its first academic year in 2013 and offers courses in all streams of engineering under the Dr. A P J Abdul Kalam Technological University.

=== Energy ===
The group formed a dedicated venture – Muthoot Alternate Energy Resources and started a Wind Energy Project in 1993 with wind farms located in Muppandhal village in Kanyakumari district, Tamil Nadu.

=== Agriculture ===
The Muthoot Group operates this division on a large scale. Established in 1939, The plantations grow cardamom, tea, coconut and rubber. The division also undertakes a number of eco-friendly initiatives.

=== Operations outside India ===
Muthoot Global is a part of Muthoot Group with presence in UAE, US and UK, currently dealing in Gold Loans, Money Transfer, Travel & Tourism and eCommerce. UAE operations commenced in 2002, UK operations started in 2007 and US in 2010. The group plans to diversify its foreign operations to Singapore, Germany and other GCC countries in future.

- Muthoot Finserve USA Inc is based out of New Jersey, US. The company offers wire transfer services between US and India.
- Muthoot Finance USA LTD is based out of New Jersey, US.
- Muthoot Finance UK is based out of London, UK. It currently operates 6 branches within the Greater London area, and primarily provides financial services to the South Asian community.
- Muthoot Global Money Transfers is based out of London, UK. The company provides wire transfer services between UK and India.
- Xandari Resort & Spa is located in Alajuela, Costa Rica. It is a luxury hotel located within a 30-acre plantation 30 minutes of San José, Costa Rica
- Asia Asset Finance is headquartered in Colombo, Sri Lanka. Muthoot Group acquired a majority stake in the company in 2012. Asia Asset Finance is engaged in equipment finance and gold loans.

== Sports sponsorships ==
Delhi Daredevils IPL 2011–2013. The Muthoot Group has been the main sponsor of the team, with the branding on the t-shirt chest of the Jerseys.

== Philanthropy ==
The Muthoot Group's corporate social responsibility efforts are directed towards proper sanitation, education, welfare of the lower income Group of the nation, health and technology and environmental awareness and conservation. The Muthoot Group's Charitable actions/events are all conducted by the Muthoot M George Foundation.

=== Environment research foundation ===
The Periyar Foundation set up by Muthoot Hotels is based in the town of Thekkady, near the Periyar National Park has undertaken several projects for the conservation of the national park including 'vasantha sena' and a research study along with the National Institute of Advance Studies for the conservation of 'Nocturnal Flying Squirrels'.

== Partnership ==
The company has signed a partnership agreement with UST Global to expand its business into digital.

== See also ==
- Muthoot Family
- M George Muthoot
- M G George Muthoot
- George Alexander Muthoot
