= Dhanam =

Dhanam may refer to:

- Dhanam (1991 film), a Malayalam film
- Dhanam (2008 film), a Tamil drama film
- Dhanam (business magazine), a fortnightly business magazine in Malayalam language
