= Kurangumala =

- village
- Country: India
- State: Kerala
- District: Pathanamthitta district
- Talukas: Kozhencherry

Government
  - Body: Kozhencherry

Languages
  - Official: Malayalam, English
- Time zone: UTC+5:30 (IST)
- PIN: 689641
- Telephone code: 0468
- Nearest city: Kozhencherry
- Literacy: 100%%
- Vidhan Sabha constituency: Aranmula
- Civic agency: Kozhencherry

Kurangumala (Monkey Hill) is a small sub-village of Kozhencherry town in Pathanamthitta district in Kerala, India. Kurangumala is a small hill in Kozhencherry. St. Thomas College is near to Kurangumala.

Majority of the population are Christians and Hindus.
