= George Alexander Muthoot =

Indian businessman

- Born: 16 September 1955 (age 70); Kozhencherry, State of Travancore–Cochin (present day Pathanamthitta, Kerala), India
- Education: Chartered Accountant
- Alma mater: St. Thomas College, Kozhencherry; The Institute of Chartered Accountants of India
- Occupation: Managing Director of Muthoot Group
- Spouse: Anna Alexander
- Children: 2
- Parents: M. George Muthoot; Ammini George Muthoot
- Relatives: M. G. George Muthoot (Brother); Muthoot Family

George Alexander Muthoot (born 16 September 1955) is an Indian entrepreneur and businessman who is currently the managing director of the Muthoot Group, a business conglomerate in India.

== Personal life ==
G. Alexander Muthoot was born to M George Muthoot and Ammini George Muthoot on 16 September 1955 in Kozhencherry, a small town in Kerala. M. George Muthoot managed the family business of Chit funds in Kozhencherry. He did his Bachelors in Commerce from St. Thomas College, Kozhencherry (University of Kerala), and was awarded a gold medal for obtaining the first rank in the state for the degree. He is also a Chartered Accountant certified by the ICAI, and secured All India Rank 18 for his final examinations.

He leads the Muthoot M. George Foundation (MMGF), which disburses over Rs. 250 million annually primarily for the purpose of Education and Healthcare (with focus on Kidney related ailments). Being an industry leader in the Gold Banking, in 2007 Alexander Muthoot was awarded his PhD in "Non-Traditional Banking with special reference to Gold" by the Open International University – Colombo, Sri Lanka. He paid for an Engineering College in Kochi, named Muthoot Institute of Science and Technology.

== Business career ==
G. Alexander Muthoot was appointed as the managing director of the Muthoot Group in February 1993. The conglomerate has since grown exponentially, and is currently present in over 16 diversified industries in 4 different countries. Alexander Muthoot is also the managing director of Muthoot Finance, a pioneer in Gold Banking. With over INR 263.87 bn in Assets Under Management, Muthoot Finance is India's Largest Gold Loan company (as of May 2013). The group has various interests in sectors such as financial services, plantations, media, hospitality, healthcare, education, power generation, infrastructure and money remittance. Alexander Muthoot is the President of the Association of Gold Loan Companies, an industry lobby formed by the Gold Loan companies in India, and is also the Ex-Chairman of the Kerala Non-Banking Finance Companies Welfare Association. An industry leader in Gold Banking, Alexander Muthoot is often invited to forums such as Columbia Business School and the Indian Banking Conference (BANCON), he has also participated as a guest lecturer in IIM Kozhikode, Tricy and ISB Hyderabad. and frequently authors articles in Indian news-dailies such as The Economic Times and Hindu Business Line.

India Today, a weekly magazine, ranked Alexander Muthoot as one of the most influential people in the State of Kerala in the year 2005. Asianet, an Indian television channel, selected Alexander as one of the Millennium leaders in 2000. Dhanam, a fortnightly magazine in India, ranked Muthoot as one of the most important business families in Kerala. In the year 2013 Dhanam Magazine also conferred upon Alexander Muthoot the prestigious Businessman of the year Award. He received the CA business Achiever Award 2013 under Financial Service sector from Institute of Chartered Accountants of India, New Delhi.

== See also ==
- Muthoot Family
- Muthoot Group
- M George Muthoot
- M G George Muthoot
