= St. Thomas Higher Secondary School, Kozhencherry =

Location
- Kerala; India; 9.3367°N 76.7091°E

St. Thomas Higher Secondary School, Kozhencherry is a school in Kerala, the southwestern state of India. It is located in the town centre, on the way from Kozhencherry to the district capital Pathanamthitta.

== Kozhencherry ==
In the early twentieth century, Kozhencherry was a small village in Pathanamthitta Taluk of Quilon District in the princely state of Travancore. The land was fertile and so the people were mainly farmers. Kozhencherry, on the banks of River Pamba was a commercial hub when river boats were the main mode of transport.

== History ==
An English Medium School was opened in Kozhencherry by the Kottayam (Anglican) Mission in 1822 with 40 students and two teachers. In 1904 St. Thomas Mar Thoma parish took over the running of the school. By 1910 the Travancore Education Code of 1085 M.E. (1910) came into force and the school was approved as a Middle School (Form I, II and III). In 1918 approval was given to start High School Classes (Forms IV, V and VI). It was at this time the main building, that is still in use, was completed.

Till 1941 it was a co-educational school. In that year St.Mary's Girls High School was opened nearby and all the girls were moved to the new school. Thus from 1941 it became a boys' school.

In 1992, the Kerala government moved pre-university classes from colleges to certain high schools and the school was one of them. The classes known as +2, admitted girls also. From that year onwards it was known as St. Thomas Higher Secondary School.

== Courses ==
The school now offers the following courses (following Kerala Government Syllabus)

- Upper Primary
- High School
- Higher Secondary – a two-year course leading to university education.

== Management ==
This school is managed by St. Thomas Marthoma Church, Kozhencherry. The vicar is the ex officio Manager of the school.

=== Managers ===
Rev. C.P. philipose (1904–14) Rev. K.T. Thomas, Kurumthottickal (1914–55), Rev. K.J. Philip (1956–59), Rev. K.C. Thomas (1960–61), Rev. C.G. Alexander (1961–62.

== Notable alumni ==
A few notable ex-students of the school include:

- Most Rt. Rev. Dr. Alexander Mar Thoma Metropolitan
- Most Rt. Rev. Dr. Philipose Mar Chrysostom Marthoma Valia Metropolitan
- Most Rt. Rev. Dr. Joseph Mar Thoma Metropolitan
- Most Rt. Rev. Philipose Mar Eusibeos Metropolitan
- Fr. Dr. V. C. Samuel Theologian
- Chittedathu Sankupilla, freedom fighter
- N.G. Chacko. freedom fighter
- C.M. Ninan, orator
- Riva Tholoor Philip, Kerala Congress leader
- K. M. George (Karimpumannil Mathai George), eminent Malayalam writer and educator, awarded Padma Shri in 1988 and Padma Bhushan in 2001
- Kadammanitta Ramakrishnan, poet
- Makkapuzha P.S.Vasudevan Pillai, former president of Nair Service Society
- Judge Mathews P Mathew, High Court Judge
- P.V. Neelakanta Pillai, former president of Nair Service Society
- Lipin Raj, Civil Servant and Writer
