= Chenkara =

Village in Kerala, India

Chenkara is a small village in Kothamanglam Ernakulam Kerala, India. It is located on the bank of the Periyar. It is also near Bhoothathankettu, a tourist place in Kothamangalam.

== Temple ==
Chenkara cavu (kavu) is a temple situated in the middle of village. The main deity is Naagarajavu (god of snakes). The main festival is Sarpampattu, which is conducted once every three years. During the festival Naagarajavu is believed to enter devotees' bodies, and they will dance like a snake in front of 'Sarpakalam' (a picture of snake made by natural colors').

== Tourist destination ==
Chenkara is located 8 km from the Thekkady Tiger Reservoir and Wildlife Sanctuary, Kerala. It is a tourist destination located near other tourist destinations like Thekkady, Kuttikkanam and Vagamon.

Chenkara is surrounded by a range of eight mountains (Ashta Dhik Palakar) which include Kurisumala (Cross hill) and two brother hills, locally called Annan (Elder Brother) and Thampi (Younger Brother) hills. There is a pond on the top of Cross hills around 4500 feet high. Chenkara is known for its green surroundings and meadows of tea plantation.
