= Muthoot family =

Business house

The Muthoot family is a business family in South India, which controls businesses in financial services to media. The founder of the Muthoot Group was M. N. Mathai (who goes by N. Mathai Muthoot), from whom the business house was later taken over by his son, M. George Muthoot. The family traces its roots to Thevervelil family in the small town of Kozhencherry in Central Travancore.

The Muthoot family are Christians belonging to the Malankara Orthodox Syrian Church, and is one of the most influential members among the Christian community in Kerala. M. G. George Muthoot, the third son of M. George Muthoot became the Trustee of the Malankara Orthodox Church in March 2007.

(the first three generations give their names in the following order: [Father's Name - Name - Surname ], while the current generation of the family give their names in [Name - Surname - Father's Name] or [Name - Father's Name - Surname ])

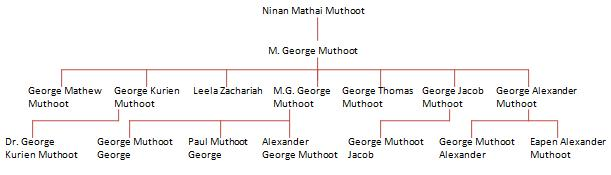
Muthoot family

As per Forbes list of India’s 100 richest tycoons, dated 9 October 2024, Muthoot family ranked 37th with a net worth of $7.8 billion. They are the richest business family of Kerala.

== See also ==
- George Alexander Muthoot
