= Muthoot Microfin =

Indian loan company

Muthoot Microfin Ltd
- Type: Public
- Traded as: NSE: MUTHOOTMF; BSE: 544055
- Industry: Financial services
- Founded: 2010
- Headquarters: Kochi, India
- Key people: Sadaf Sayeed (CEO); Udeesh Ullas (COO); Praveen T (CFO)
- Services: Microfinance
- Revenue: ▲₹1,428 crore (US$150 million) (FY23)
- Net income: ▲₹163 crore (US$17 million) (FY23)
- Owner: Muthoot Fincorp (72.36%)
- Parent: Muthoot Pappachan Group
- Website: muthootmicrofin.com

Muthoot Microfin Limited is an Indian microfinance institution (MFI), headquartered in Kochi. It primarily provides unsecured microloans to women in rural areas. It is a part of Muthoot Pappachan Group.

== History ==
The microfinance business was originally established as a division of Muthoot Fincorp Limited in 2010. In December 2011, the Muthoot Pappachan Group acquired Pancharatna Securities Ltd, a non-banking financial company (NBFC) based in Mumbai, and subsequently rebranded it as Muthoot Microfin Limited (MML).

In March 2015, Muthoot Microfin Limited (MML) obtained a microfinance institution (MFI) license as a non-banking financial company (NBFC-MFI) from the Reserve Bank of India.

In 2021, Muthoot Microfin Ltd launched Mahila Mitra app to help rural women beneficiaries with repayment.

== Operations ==
Muthoot Microfin operates in 18 states with 1,172 branches and over 10,000 employees. As of March 31, 2023, Muthoot Microfin has a portfolio size of ₹9,200 crore with a borrower base of 2.7 million women entrepreneurs.

== Ownership ==
Muthoot Microfin is predominantly owned by Muthoot Fincorp and the Muthoot family, who collectively possess a controlling stake of 71% in the company. In addition, London-based private equity firm GPC (Greater Pacific Capital) holds an ownership interest of 16.6%, while Chicago-based private equity fund Creation Investments Capital Management holds 9.3%.
