= M. G. George Muthoot =

Indian entrepreneur and businessman (1949–2021)

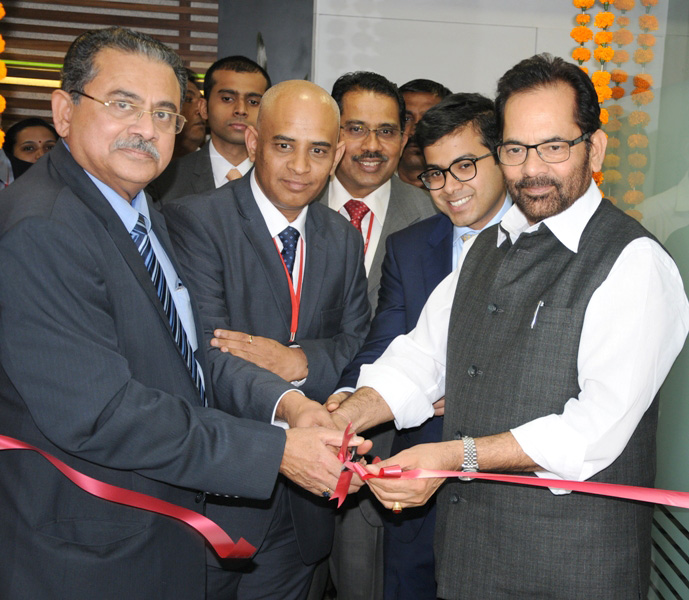
- Born: 2 November 1949; Kozhencherry, United State of Travancore and Cochin, Dominion of India (present day Pathanamthitta, Kerala, India)
- Died: 5 March 2021 (aged 71)
- Education: Manipal University (B.E.)
- Occupation: Chairman of the Muthoot Group
- Children: 3, including Alexander George Muthoot
- Parents: M. George Muthoot; Ammini George Muthoot
- Relatives: George Alexander Muthoot (brother); Muthoot Family

Mathai George George Muthoot (abbr. George M'George) (2 November 1949 – 5 March 2021) was an Indian entrepreneur and businessman. He was the third generation of his family to be chairman of the Muthoot Group, and the former Lay Trustee of the Indian Orthodox Church. He was also a member of the National Executive Committee of the Federation of Indian Chambers of Commerce and Industry (FICCI) and the Chairman of the FICCI Kerala State Council.

Forbes Asia Magazine listed him as the 50th richest man in India in 2011 and his ranking climbed to 44th richest in India according to Forbes' India's Richest list 2019. As per the Forbes' rich list 2020, he was the richest man in Kerala.

== Early life ==
Born on 2 November 1949 in (Kozhencherry), Pathanamthitta, Kerala, M. G. George Muthoot is the grandson of Muthoot Ninan Mathai, founder of the Muthoot Group, and the third son of M. George Muthoot, founder of the financial services arm of that group. He graduated with Bachelor of Engineering from Manipal Institute of Technology.

== Career Graph ==
Muthoot's first job was as an office assistant in the family's bank. In 1979, he became managing director of the bank. He was appointed chairman of Muthoot Group in February 1993.

At the time he took over the operations at Muthoot, the Group had 31 branches in four states, namely Kerala, Delhi, Chandigarh, and Haryana. There are 4433 branches today and the Group has an annual turnover of ₹450 crore (₹4.5 Billion) as of May 2009.

Muthoot was a member of the executive committee of the Federation of Indian Chambers of Commerce and Industry, and the Chairman of the FICCI Kerala State Council.

Muthoot was awarded the Mahatma Gandhi National Award by the Mahatma Gandhi National Foundation in 2001 for his contributions to the Indian industry. In 2012, he received the Golden Peacock Award for Corporate Social Responsibility. In January 2013, Muthoot Finance was awarded The SKOCH Award for Financial Inclusion. M.G George Muthoot was honored with the Distinguished and Outstanding Alumnus of 2015 award instituted by Manipal University.

Muthoot was ranked 50th with $1.10 bn in the list of Indian billionaires by Forbes in October 2011.

== Personal life ==
Muthoot was married to Sara George Muthoot, who is the Director of St. George’s School in New Delhi. They have three sons. Their eldest son George M. George is the Executive Director of the Group and the youngest son Alexander George who is the Director of the Group. Their second son, Paul Muthoot George, was murdered in 2009.

== Death ==
M. G. George Muthoot died on 5 March 2021 aged 71 at a private hospital in Delhi after falling from 4th floor of his house. His dead body was taken to his native place, and was buried there with full state honours.
