= Muthoot Finance =

Indian financial services company

- Type: Public
- Traded as: BSE: 533398; NSE: MUTHOOTFIN
- Industry: Financial services
- Founded: 1939; 87 years ago
- Headquarters: Kochi, Kerala, India
- Key people: George Jacob Muthoot (Chairman); Alexander George (Managing Director); George Thomas Muthoot (Joint MD)
- Products: Mortgage loans, Insurance, Mutual funds;
- Revenue: ▲₹12,237 crore (US$1.3 billion) (FY22)
- Operating income: ▲₹9,666 crore (US$1.0 billion) (FY22)
- Net income: ▲₹4,031 crore (US$430 million) (FY22)
- Total assets: ▲₹54,881 crore (US$5.9 billion) (2020)
- Total equity: ▲₹11,414 crore (US$1.2 billion) (2020)
- Number of employees: 53,000+ (2026)
- Parent: The Muthoot Group
- Subsidiaries: Muthoot Homefin (India) Limited; Muthoot Insurance Brokers Private Limited; Belstar Microfinance Limited; Asia Asset Finance plc
- Website: www.muthootfinance.com

Muthoot Finance Ltd is an Indian financial corporation and the largest gold loan NBFC in the country. In addition to financing gold loans, the company offers other forms of loans, insurance and money transfer services, and sells gold coins. The company is headquartered in Kochi, Kerala, and operates over 7,500 branches in the country. Outside India, Muthoot Finance is established in the UK, the US, and the United Arab Emirates.

The company falls under the brand umbrella of the Muthoot Group. Its shares are listed on the BSE and NSE since its initial public offering in 2011. The target market of Muthoot Finance includes small businesses, vendors, farmers, traders, SME business owners, and salaried individuals.

== History ==
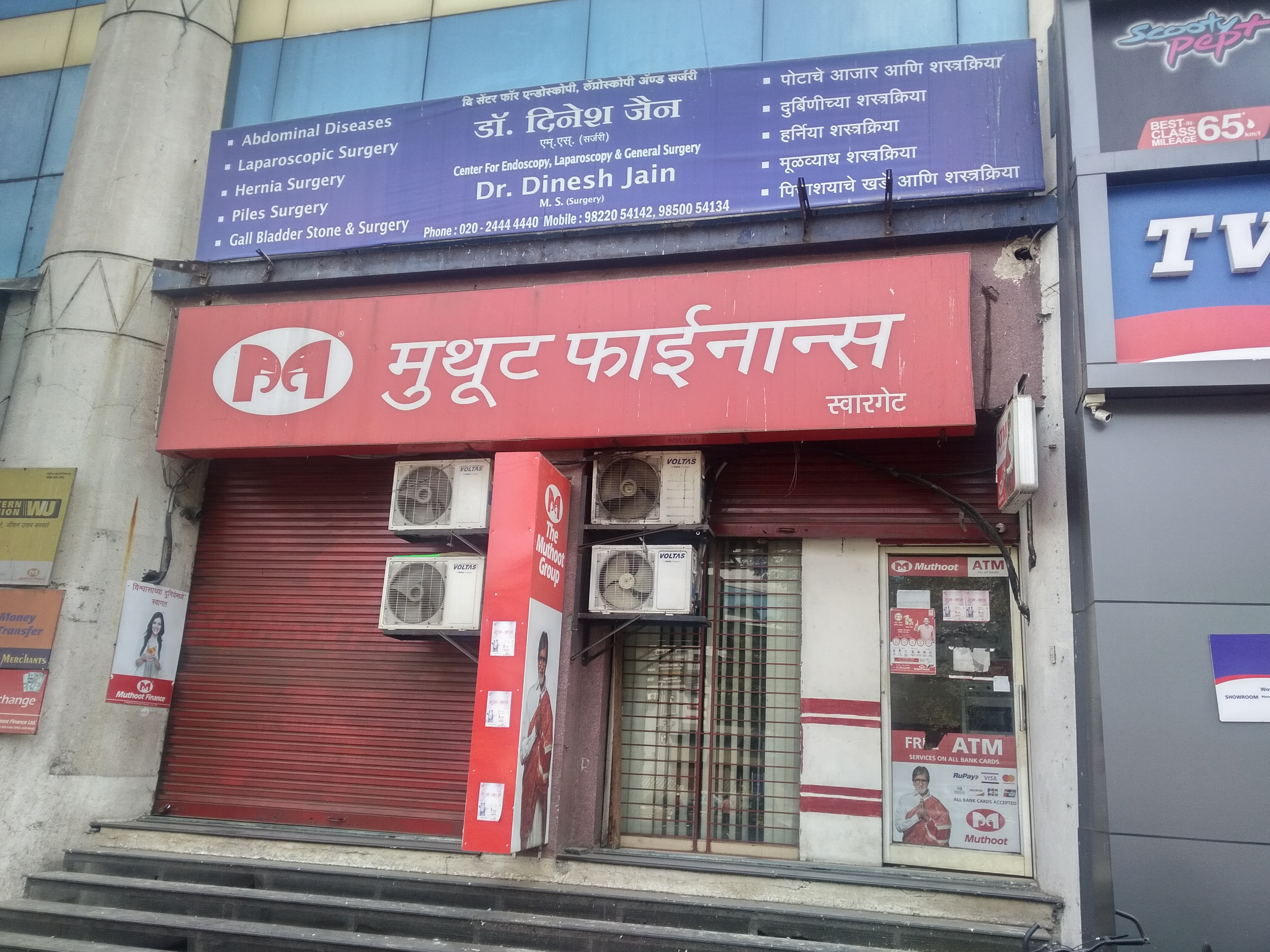
Muthoot Finance branch in Swargate, Pune

The company was incorporated as a private limited company on 14 March 1997 with the name "The Muthoot Finance Private Limited" under the Companies Act.

On 18 November 2008, the company was converted into a public limited company with the name "Muthoot Finance Limited". During the year 2009–10, the company added 620 new branches.

In 2014, Muthoot Finance acquired a majority stake in Asia Asset Finance plc, a Sri Lankan publicly listed financial services company.

In July 2016, Muthoot Finance acquired 46.83% of the capital of Belstar Investment and Finance Private Limited (BIFPL).

In May 2018, Muthoot Finance acquired Muthoot Money, a Non Deposit taking Non-Banking Financial Company.

In July 2026, the Reserve Bank of India Imposed a ₹5.80 lakh penalty on Muthoot Finance for non-compliance with KYC directions and transaction monitoring guidelines.

In August 2026, the board of directors recommended the appointment of Alexander George as Managing Director, effective October 1 2026, subject to shareholder approval at the upcoming Annual General Meeting.Under the proposed management transition, incumbent Managing Director George Alexander Muthoot was names Executive Vice Chairman, while K. R. Bijimon was elevated to CEO.

== Operations ==
In 2026, the company reported an improvement in asset quality, with Gross Stage 3 asset declining sequentially to 2.28% and Net Stage 3 assets standing at 1.99%

As of 2026, Muthoot Finance operates a network of over 7,500 branches across India, and bank as over 53,000+ employees across its corporate operations. The Company reports having served over 70 crore customer transaction, including repeat borrowers, since its inception.
