= Dhanam (business magazine) =

- Frequency: Fortnightly
- Publisher: Dhanam Publications Pvt. Ltd.
- Founder: Kurian Abraham
- Founded: 1987
- Country: India
- Based in: Kochi, Kerala
- Language: Malayalam
- Website: www.dhanamonline.com

Dhanam is a fortnightly business magazine in Malayalam language, published in the state of Kerala, India. It was first published in 1987 and was the only major source of business news and related topics in the state at that time. The Malayalam word "Dhanam" translates to "wealth" in English.

Dhanam has brought out special editions like Top Business Families of Kerala, Emerging 500 Small & Medium Business Leaders of Kerala, Top 100 Brands of Kerala and Top 100 Women Entrepreneurs in Kerala.

Dhanam is published by Dhanam Publications Pvt. Ltd., a leading media organisation in Kerala headquartered in Kochi.

== Dhanam Business Awards ==
The prestigious Dhanam Business Awards have been instituted to honour those who have made outstanding contributions to the development of industry in the state of Kerala. Some of the high profile award winners include M E Meeran, Kochouseph Chittilappilly, C J George, V K Mathews, T S Kalyanaraman, K Madhavan, George Alexander Muthoot, etc. Other awards instituted by Dhanam include: Dhanam Retail Awards, Dhanam Brand Awards & Dhanam BFSI Awards

== DhanamOnline ==
DhanamOnline.com (formerly dhanammagazine.com) is a leading business and investment news website in the Malayalam language owned by Dhanam Publications Pvt. Ltd. DhanamOnline publishes podcasts and videos apart from informative articles.
