= Kozhencherry East =

- village
- Nickname: East Kozhencherry
- Location in Kerala, India Kozhencherry East (India)
- Coordinates: 9.327688°N 76.723404°E
- Country: India
- State: Kerala
- District: Pathanamthitta

Languages
  - Official: Malayalam, English
- Time zone: UTC+5:30 (IST)
- PIN: 689 641
- Telephone code: 0468
- Vehicle registration: KL-03
- Lok Sabha constituency: Pathanamthitta

Kozhencherry East, is a village in Pathanamthitta district of Kerala, India.

== See also ==
- Pathanamthitta
