= Thekkady =

- Hill station
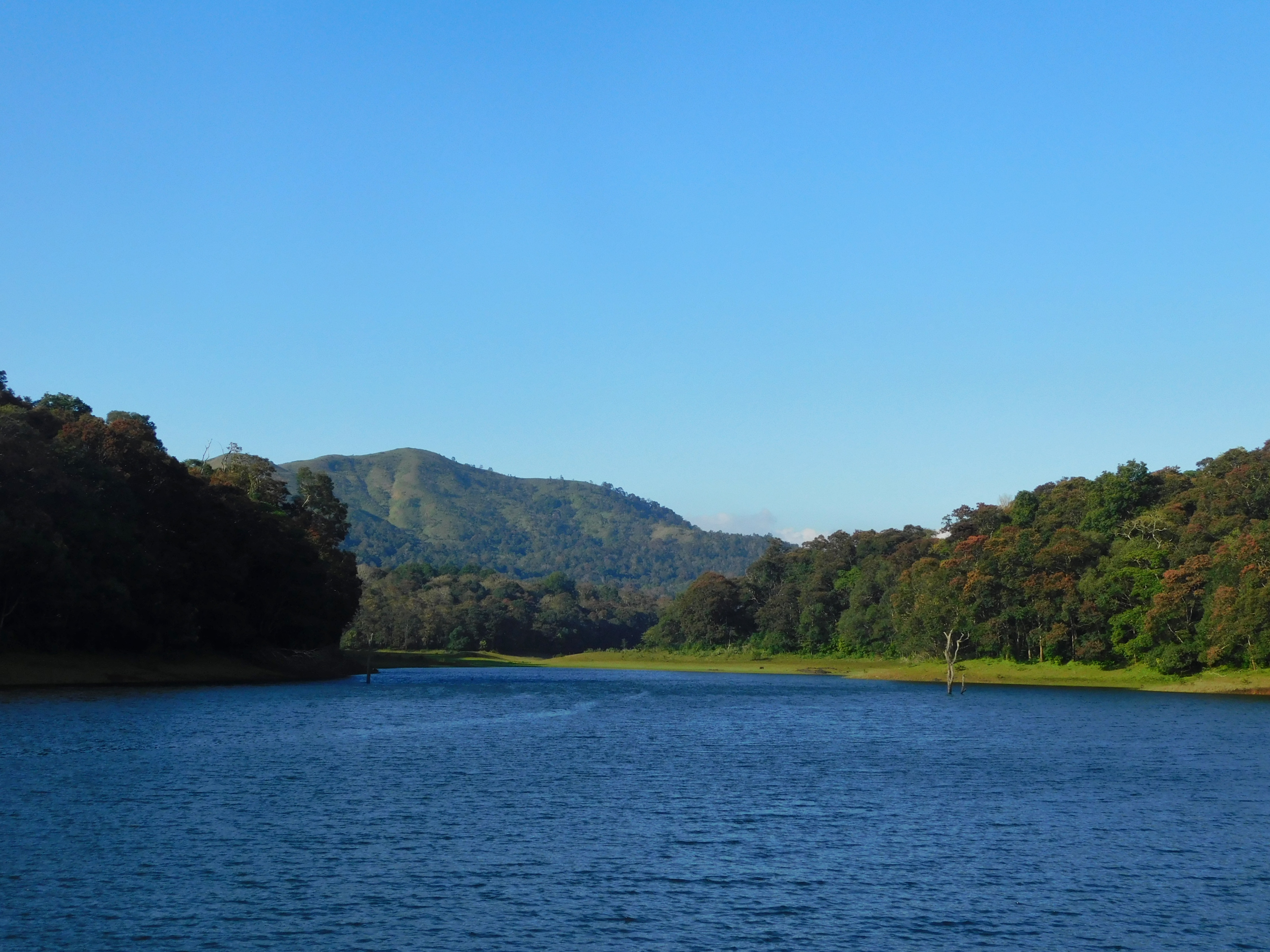
- Landscape at Thekkady

- Location in Kerala, India Thekkady (India)
- Coordinates: 9.533°N 77.200°E
- Country: India
- State: Kerala
- District: Idukki
- Taluk: Peerumedu

Languages
  - Official: Malayalam, English
- Time zone: UTC+5:30 (IST)
- Vehicle registration: KL-37
- Website: www.idukki.nic.in

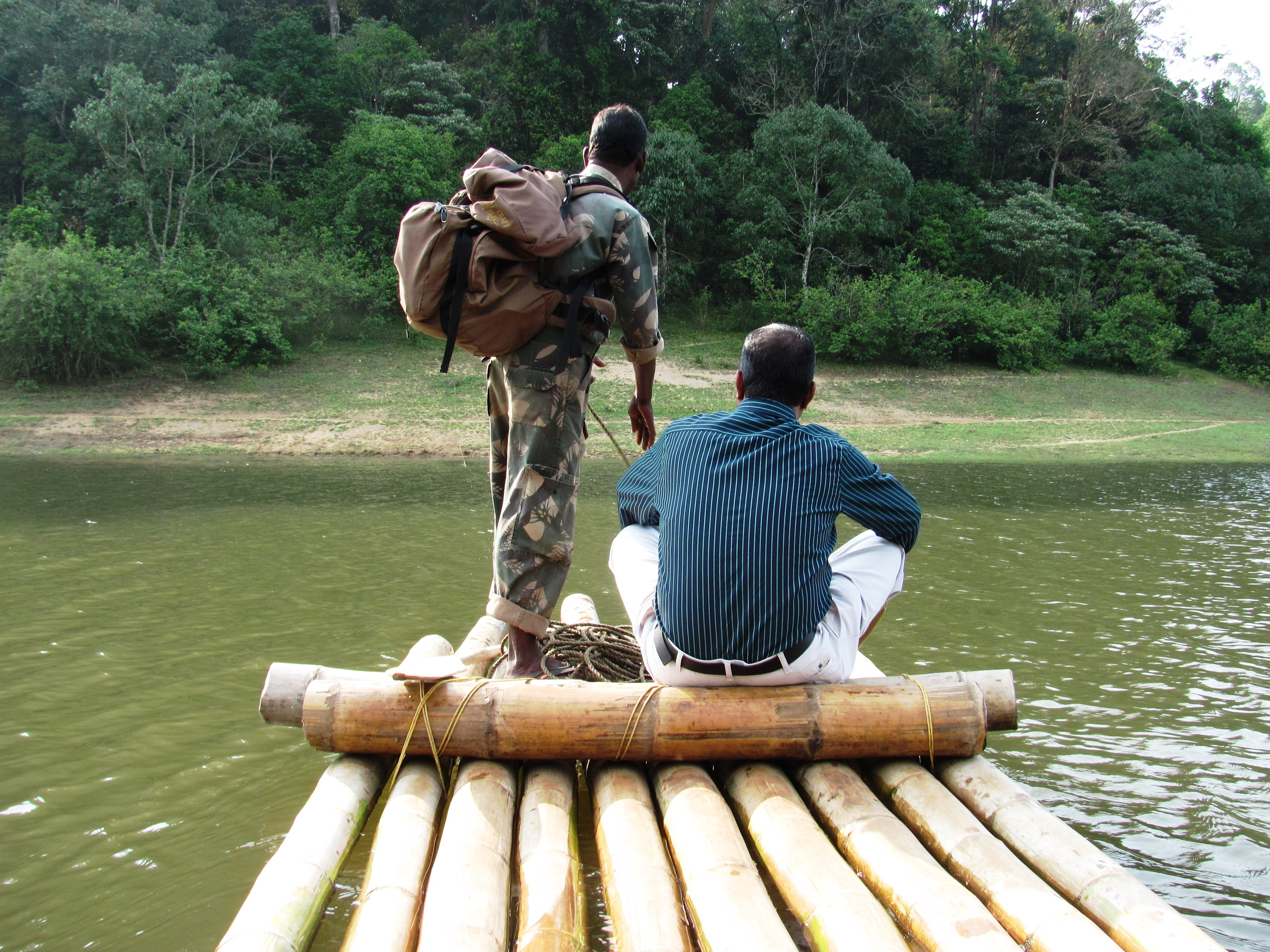
Rafting in Thekkady

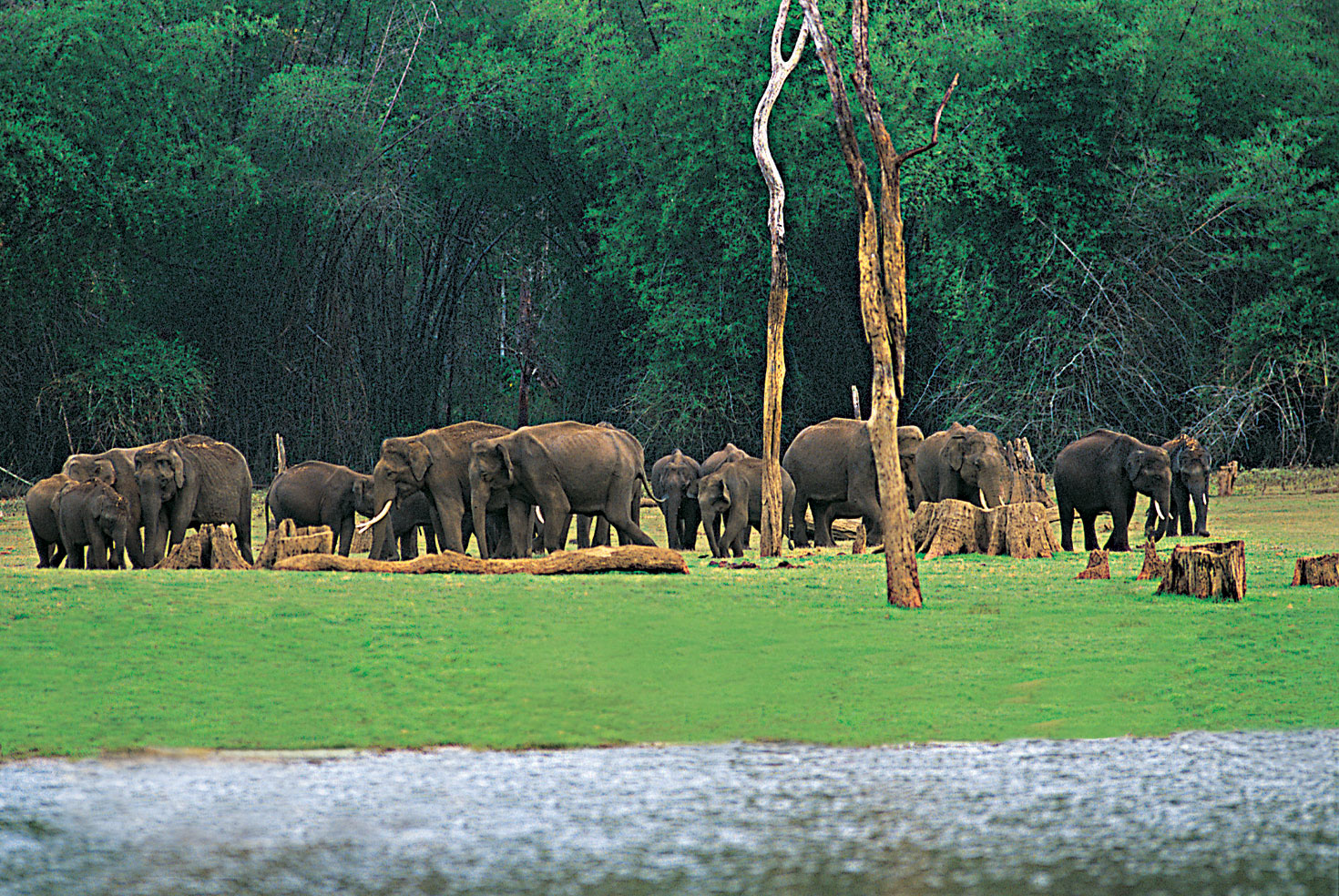
Elephants in Thekkady

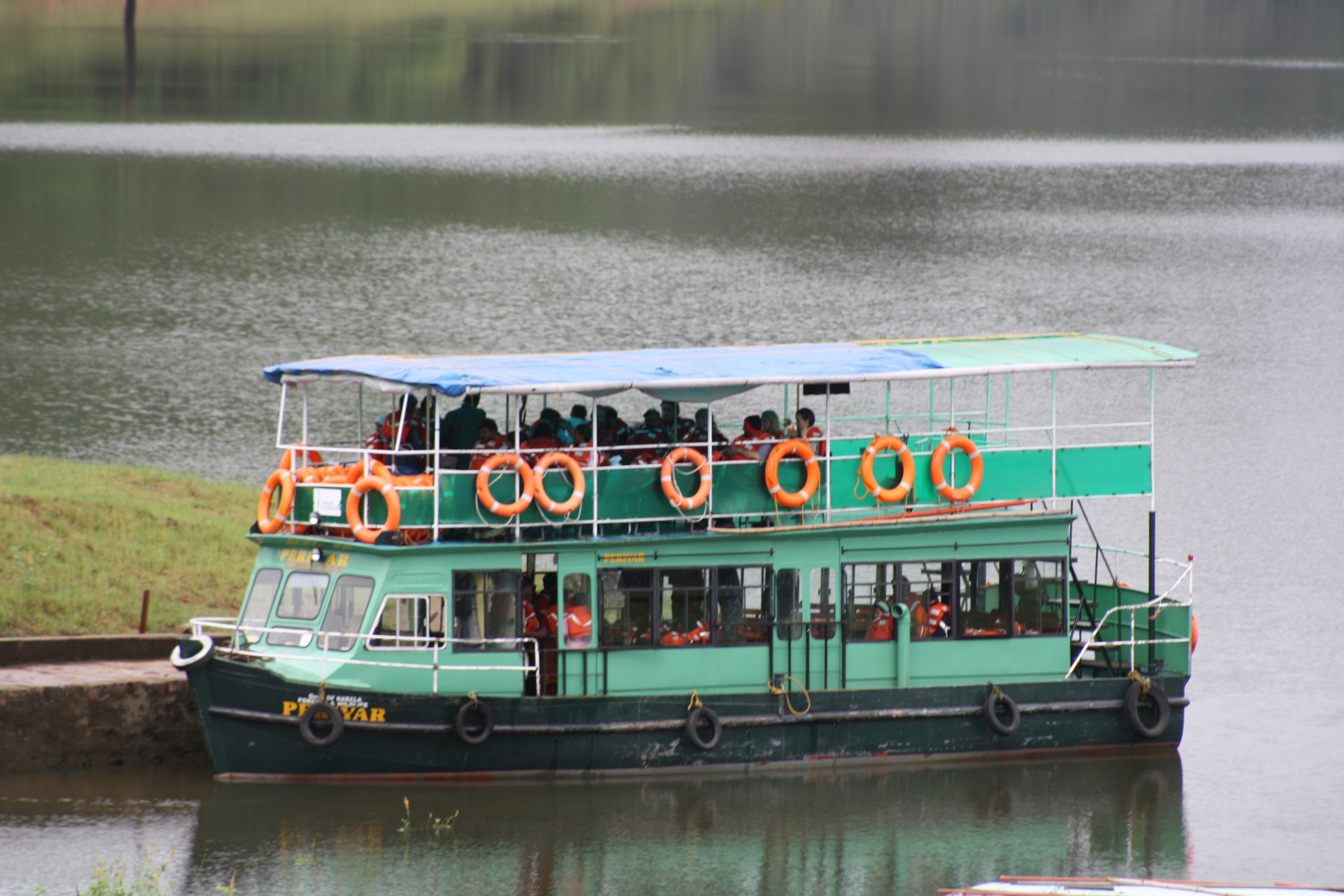
Boating

Thekkady (Malayalam: [t̪eːkːɐɖi]) in Idukki district is a town near Periyar National Park, a tourist attraction in the Indian state of Kerala. The name Thekkady is derived from the word "thekku" which means teak and "adi" meaning bottom. Temperatures are lowest in the months of December–January and highest in the months of April–May.

== Overview ==
Thekkady is situated about 257 km (160 mi) from Trivandrum, 145 km from Cochin International Airport and 114 km from Kottayam railway station. It is 4 km from Kumily, a plantation town on the Kerala-Tamil Nadu border. The sanctuary is famous for its dense evergreen, semi-evergreen, moist deciduous forests and savanna grass lands. It is home to herds of elephants, sambar, tigers, gaur, lion-tailed macaques and Nilgiri langurs. Due to the density of the forest, sightings of elephants and especially tigers are highly unlikely.

The Periyar Wildlife Sanctuary is spread across 777 km^{2} (300 sq mi), of which 360 km^{2} (140 sq mi) is thick evergreen forest. The wildlife sanctuary was declared a tiger reserve in 1978. The artificial lake formed by the Mullaperiyar Dam across the Periyar River is a key element of the park. The greatest attractions of Periyar are wild deer and bison that come down to drink in the lake. The sanctuary can be accessed by trekking, boating or jeep safari.

Thekkady has spice plantations including black pepper, cardamom, cinnamon, nutmeg, mace, ginger, and clove.

== 2009 boat accident ==
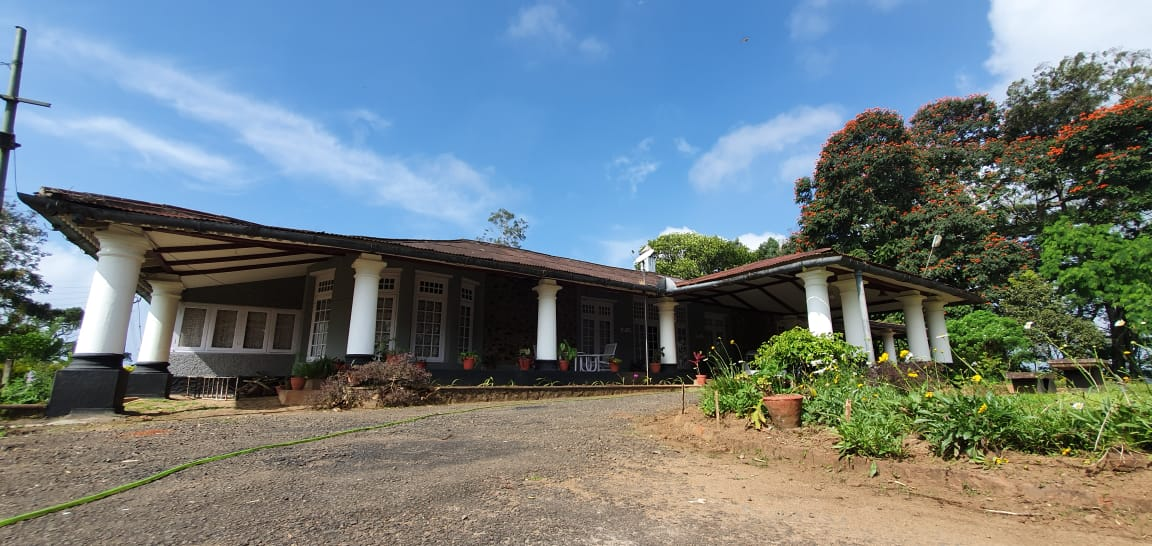
Pattumalay Tea Bungalow

== Gallery ==
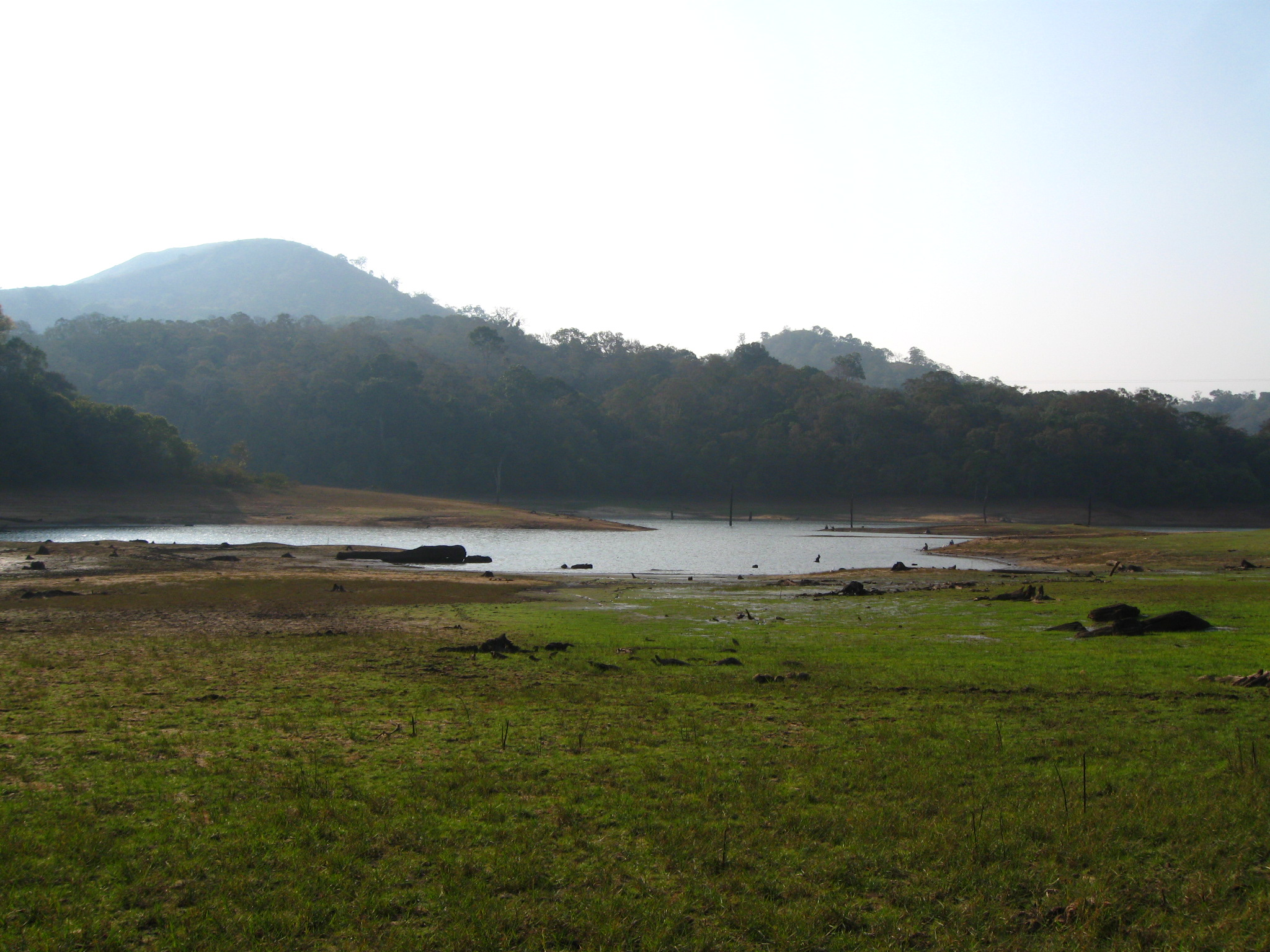
The Thekkady lake as seen from Periyar Wildlife Sanctuary

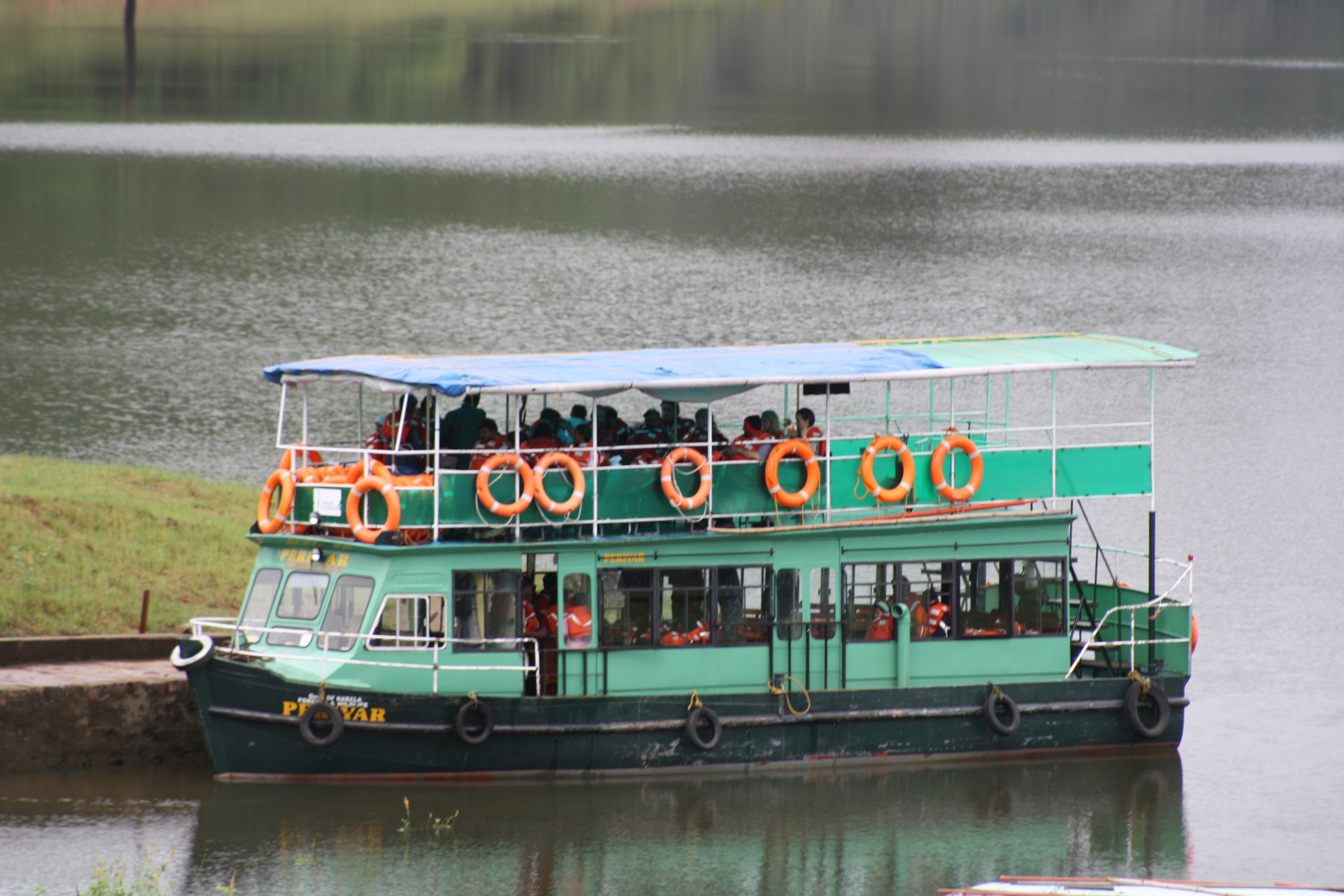
A boat cruise on Periyar river

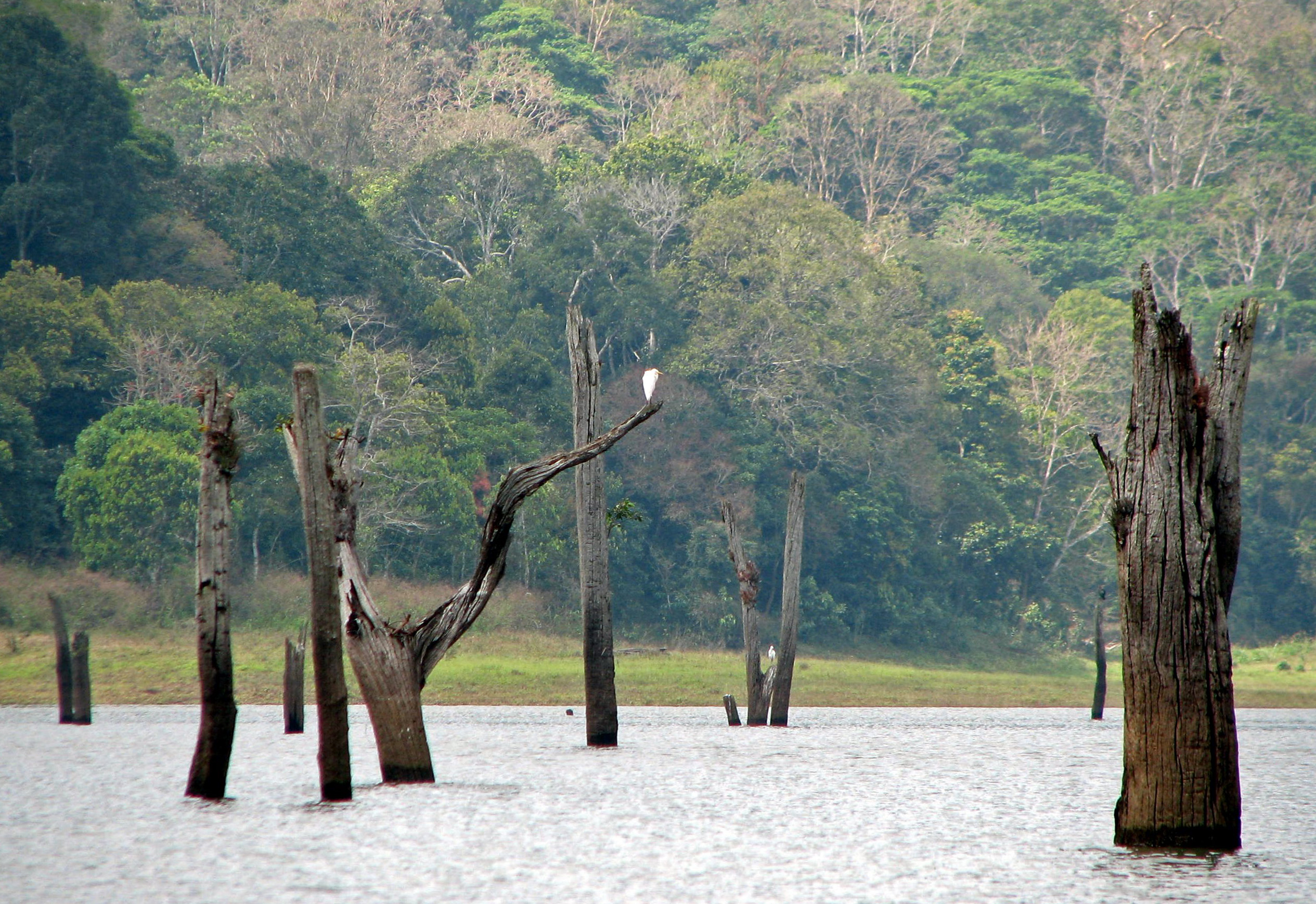
Submerged trees in Periyar National Park

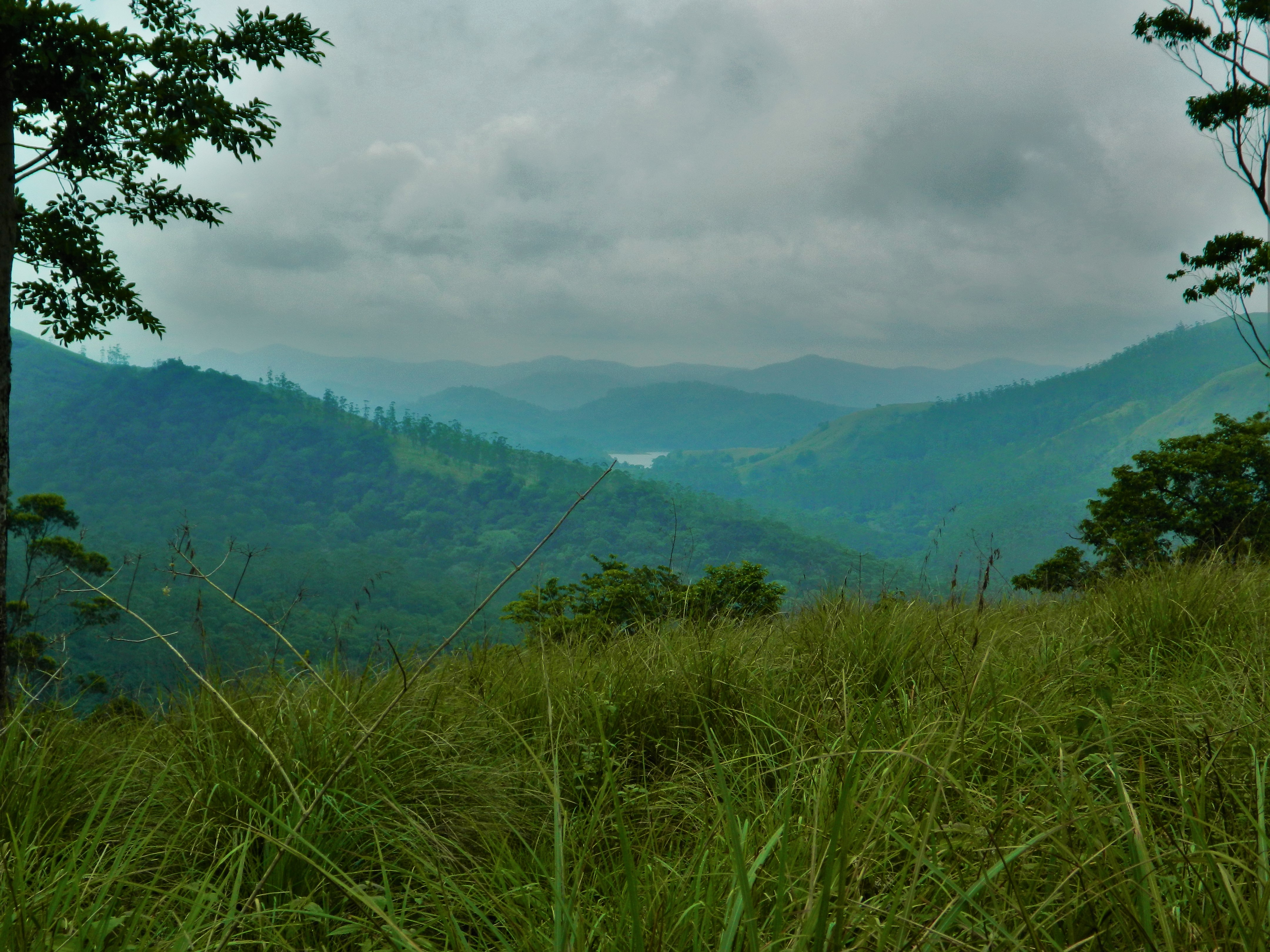
The misty mountain ranges of the Periyar region

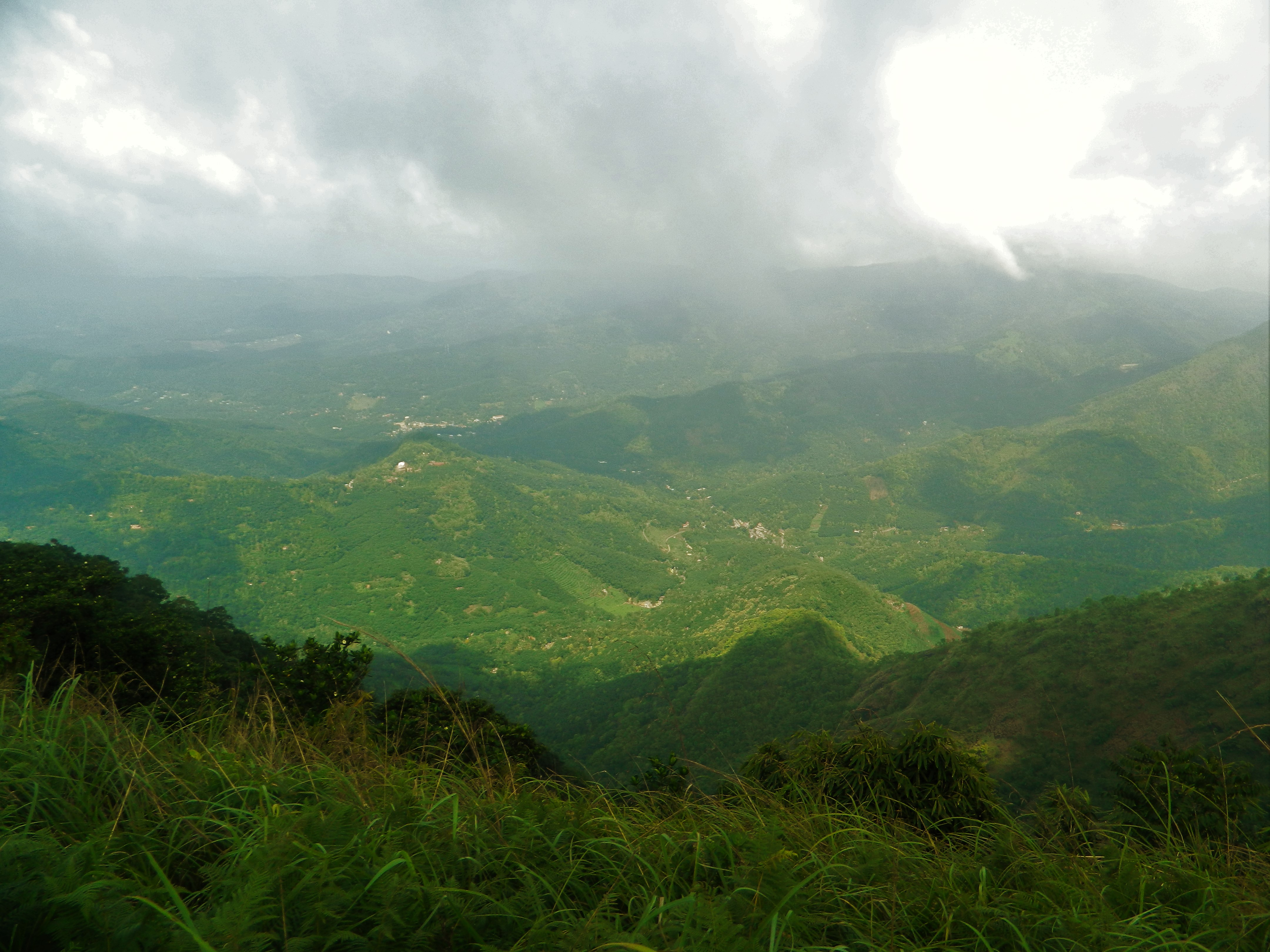
Southern Western Ghats, Near Thekkady in Kerala

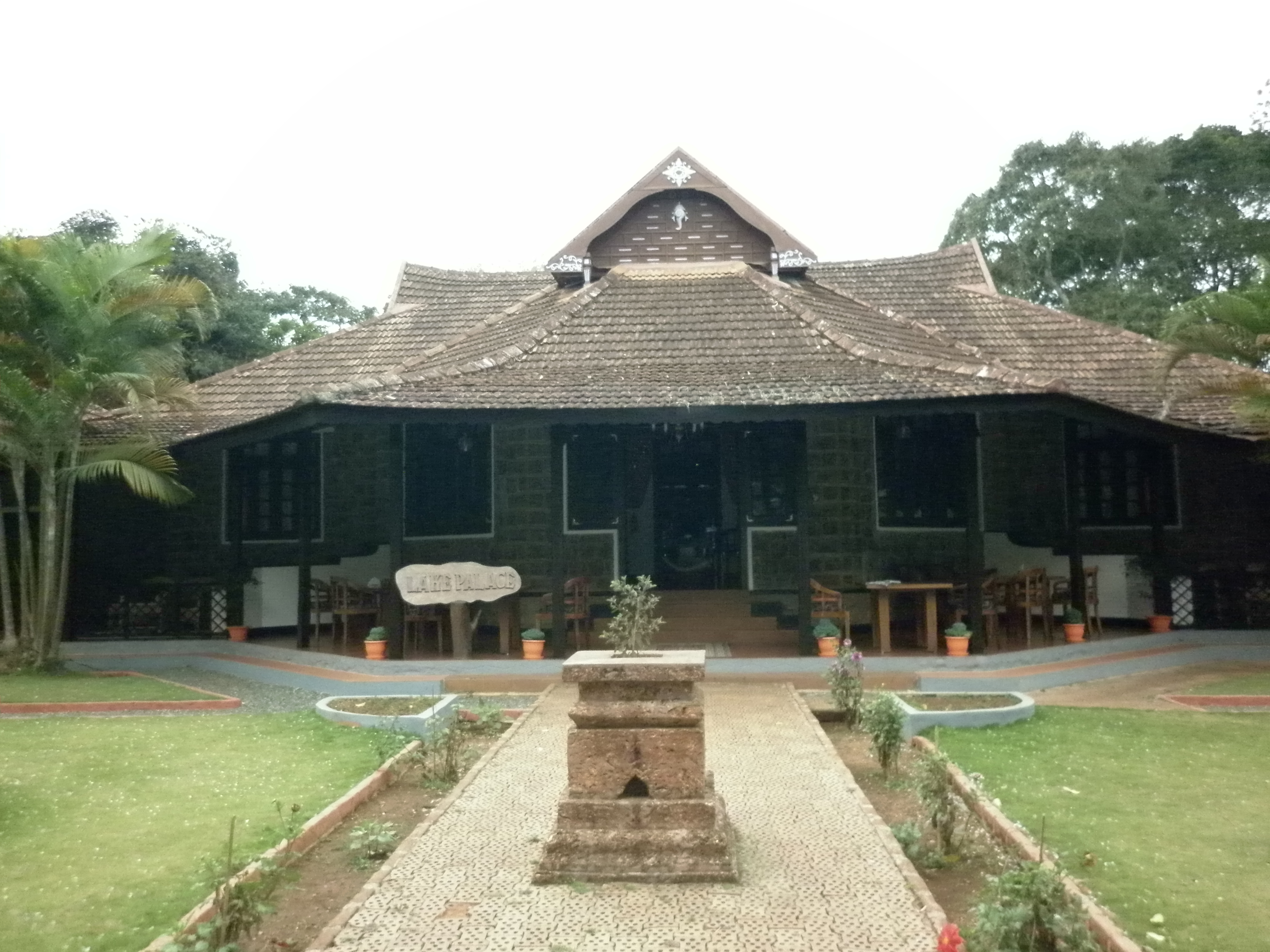
Lake Palace

== See also ==
- Vellaramkunnu
- Kalvary Mount
- Kumily
- Kattappana
