= St. Thomas Marthoma Church, Kozhencherry =

St. Thomas Mar Thoma Church, Kozhencherry
- Kozhencherry Valiya Pally
- St. Thomas Mar Thoma Church, Kozhencherry
- Location: Kozhencherry, Pathanamthitta District, Kerala
- Country: India
- Denomination: Mar Thoma Syrian Church
- Tradition: Syrian
- Website: http://www.kozhencherrymtc.org/

History
- Founded: AD 1599
- Dedication: St Thomas

Architecture
- Groundbreaking: 1932
- Completed: 1941

Administration
- Diocese: Niranam Maramon Diocese

St. Thomas Marthoma Church, also known as Kozhencherry Valiya Palli, is a prominent Christian church belonging to the Malankara Mar Thoma Syrian Church, situated in the heart of Kozhencherry town on the banks of the Pamba in Pathanamthitta district of Central Travancore region of Kerala, India. The Maramon Convention, the largest Christian gathering in Asia, is held every February on the sand bed of the Pamba River, which is near the church. This church is one of the oldest in Kerala, having been established in AD 1599. In 1941, a new church was built adjacent to the old one. At the time of the construction of the new church, it was the largest Christian church building in the Central Travancore region.

== Church history ==
=== Kochupally ===
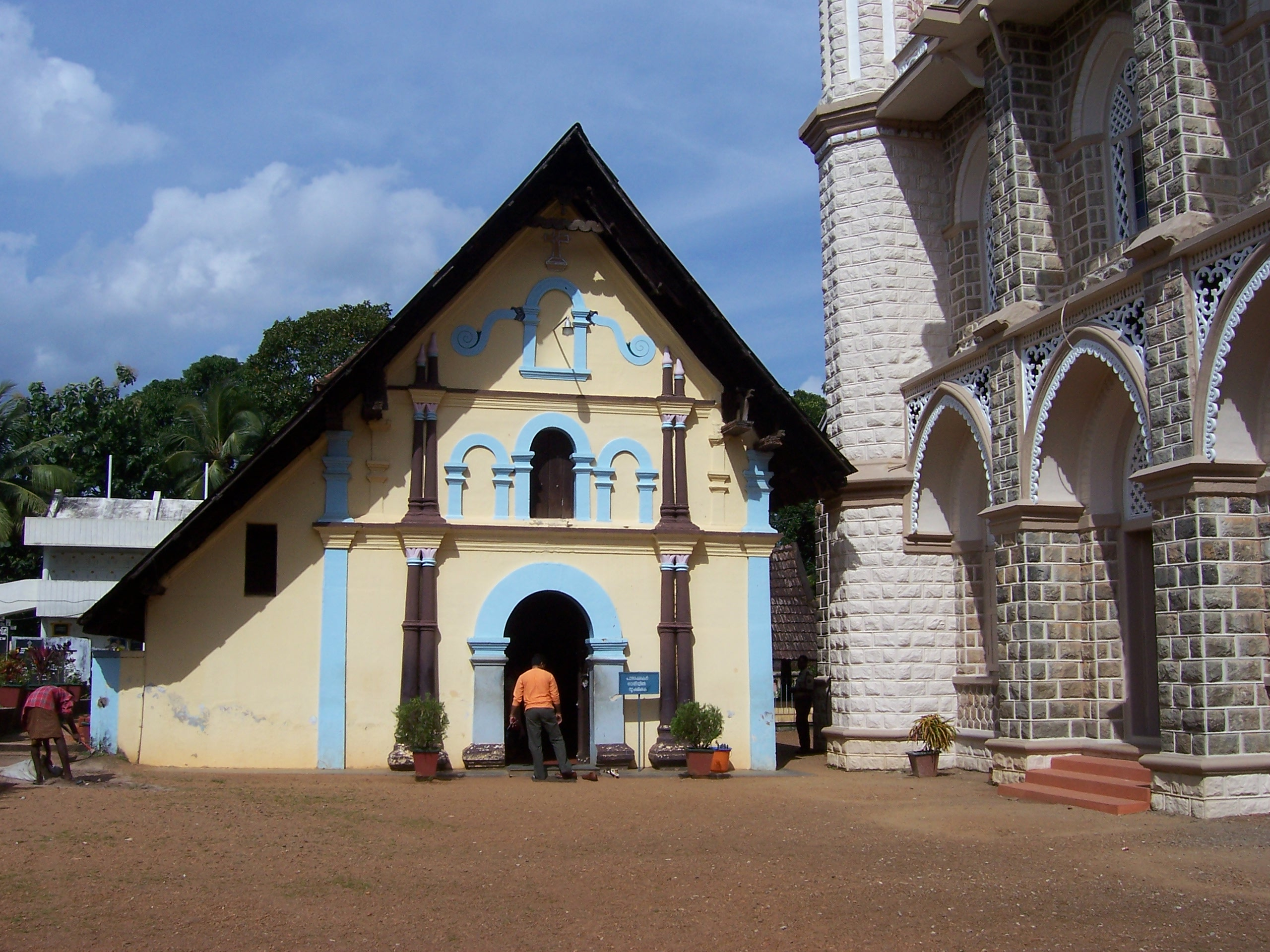
Kochupally, Kozhencherry

Certain ancient Christian families who resided on the banks of the River Pampa have recorded their origins, and these pieces of evidence speak of early Christian settlers around Kozhencherry worshiping in the churches at Maramon and Chengannur. According to these records, the earliest church at Kozhencherry was constructed in AD 1599, according to the Malayalam Era (M.E. 775). The location of the church, a small thatched building, was at Vennapra, a hilly area on the eastern part of the Mulayodil field, situated towards the east of the present St. Thomas Mar Thoma Church in Kozhencherry. The society in those days, dominated by Hinduism, was plagued by the evils of caste discrimination and untouchability. While the renovation of the church was in progress, the Kovilans demolished the church, enraged by the supposed disrespect of some of the 'Mappilas'. The prominent Christians of the time organized themselves and brought their grievance to the attention of the then ruling King, Maharaja Thekkumkur Kulasekhara. As a result, His Highness the Maharaja graciously granted the land which belonged to the Chengazhasseri illom (where the present Kochupalli is situated), and the land was exempted from giving tax by the authority of the seal of the Maharaja on a Chempola.

Worship was resumed in a temporary structure constructed to the north of Kochupalli, where the present cemetery stands. The people of the locality joined the Maramon Church for worship until the church was re-established in Kozhencherry.

Around 950 M.E. (1774) a new church was established in the name of Virgin Mary in the location of the present Kochupalli.

Subsequent to the 'Naveekaranam' in Malankara Church, launched by Abraham Malpan, in 1012 M.E. (1836) the Malankara Syrian Church split into two factions one supporting naveekaranam (reformation) and the others who was against it, following a court order. As a result, reformist faction established them self as separate church known as Malankara Marthoma Syrian Church . The Kochupalli in Kozhencherry was among the few churches allotted to the Marthoma church. Afterwards, the Marthomites and the Orthodox believers conducted their worship in the Kochupalli taking turns.

In 1069 M.E. (1893) the church was renovated. On the northern side of the compound wall, where the old church had existed, a piece of land was set apart for use as a cemetery. The expenses were met by the Marthomites. On finishing the work, the Orthodox were asked to meet a share of the expenses which was not obliged to by them. A court case was filed and the judgement asked the Orthodox to remit a share of the expenses if they were to conduct worship once in five times. But the orthodox were not prepared to comply with it. They secured a place of their own and established a parish church, which they could use with full freedom. This left the Kochupalli exclusively to the Marthomites. As the large majority of Christian families of this area continued to support Naveekaranam, the number of parishioners increased and the Kozhencherry Church grew stronger day by day.

=== St. Thomas Marthoma Valia Pally, Kozhencherry ===
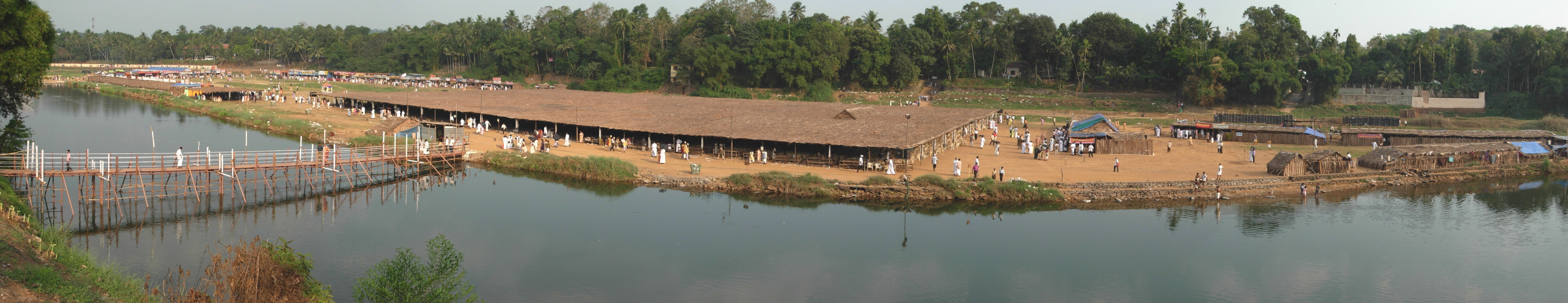
Maramon Convention is held in the Kozhencherry side of river Pamba

In order to accommodate the increasing number of parishioners, it became inevitable to enlarge the Kochupalli. But there was strong opposition from the parishioners about demolishing the Kochupalli. Many of them wanted the Kochupalli to be kept intact as it was one of the very few buildings representing the antiquity and the treasured traditions of the Mar Thoma church. However, Edavaka sangham, the Parish General Body was aware of the inadequacy of the available plot and it was decided to secure a new plot and construct a new bigger church. Some were of the opinion that if a plot adjoining the church ground on the western side was purchased there would be enough space to construct a new church. But there was a pathway in between the two plots. The intervention of the influential Rev. C. P. Philipose was instrumental in arranging a new pathway in place of the old one. After this, the Mannurethu plot on the western side of the church was bought and under the inspiring leadership of Kurumthottickal Thomas Kathanar II (Rev. K. T. Thomas), the initial steps were taken to build the new church.

Titus II Mar Thoma Metropolitan laid the foundation stone of the church on 8 Vrichikam 1108 M.E. (23-11-1932). Koikalethu Mathai Upadesi gave constant and able support to Rev. K. T. Thomas in constructing the church. On 8 April 1941, the dedication ceremony of the biggest church in Travancore at that time was led by Abraham Mar Thoma Metropolitan. According to the church records, it took only 46, 000/- for the entire construction of the church. Even today, the imposing edifice, remarkable for its architectural beauty, with its walls built of perfectly shaped stones stands tall in Central Travancore in all its grandeur and majesty.

Today St Thomas Mar Thoma Church, Kozhencherry has a large congregation with more than 1780 families and about 13475 members.

== Institutions ==
=== Mar Thoma Senior Secondary School ===
Mar Thoma Senior Secondary School, Kozhencherry was established in the year 1982.

The school is situated in Kozhencherry. The Mar Thoma Metropolitan is the patron and the vicar of the St. Thomas Mar Thoma Church, Kozhencherry is the Manager of the school.

=== St. Thomas Higher Secondary School ===
The St. Thomas High school, Kozhencherry was established in the year 1910.

The School is situated at the heart of Kozhencherry town just a short distance from the St. Thomas Mar Thoma church, Kozhencherry. The school was upgraded to Higher Secondary level in the year 1998 incorporating the system of co-education at higher secondary level.

=== St. Mary's Girls High School ===
St. Mary's Girls High School was founded in 1930.

=== Pain and palliative care ===
The pain and palliative care unit was inaugurated on 24 August 2008 by Philipose Mar Chrysostom Valiya Metropolitan. Its purpose is to support severely ill and bed-ridden patients in and around Kozhencherry.
