= Kozhencherry =

Kozhencherry കോഴഞ്ചേരി
- Census Town
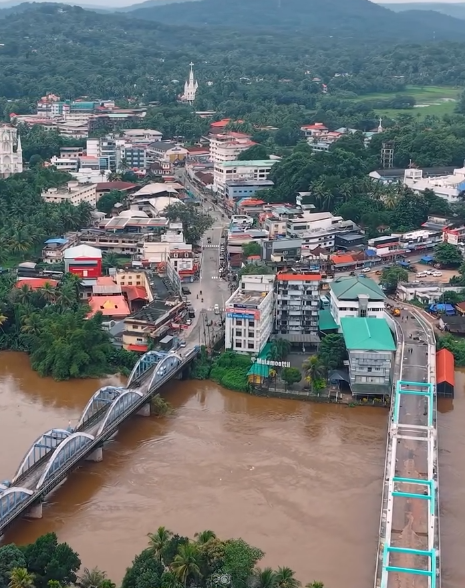
- Kozhencherry Skyline

- Location in Kerala, India Kozhencherry (India)
- Coordinates: 9.3388°N 76.7127°E
- Country: India
- State: Kerala
- District: Pathanamthitta

Government
  - Type: Panchayati Raj (India)
  - Body: Gram Panchayat

Area
  - Total: 9.74 km^{2} (3.76 sq mi)

Population (2011)
  - Total: 12,021
  - Density: 1,230/km^{2} (3,200/sq mi)

Languages
  - Official: Malayalam, English
- Time zone: UTC+5:30 (IST)
- PIN: 689 641
- Telephone code: 91-468
- Vehicle registration: KL-03
- Nearest city: Thiruvalla
- Sex ratio: 90:29 ♂️/♀️
- Literacy: 96%
- Lok Sabha constituency: Pathanamthitta
- Vidhan Sabha constituency: Aranmula
- Civic agency: Grama Panchayat

Kozhencherry is a census town in the Pathanamthitta district of South Central Kerala in the Kerala state, India. As of 2011 census, the population was 12,021, of which 5,594 are males while 6,427 are females.

== Etymology ==
The name Kozhencherry is believed to have originated from the Malayalam word "Kovilancheri," which refers to a settlement near a temple in the banks of a river. Over time, the name evolved into Kozhencherry.

== History ==
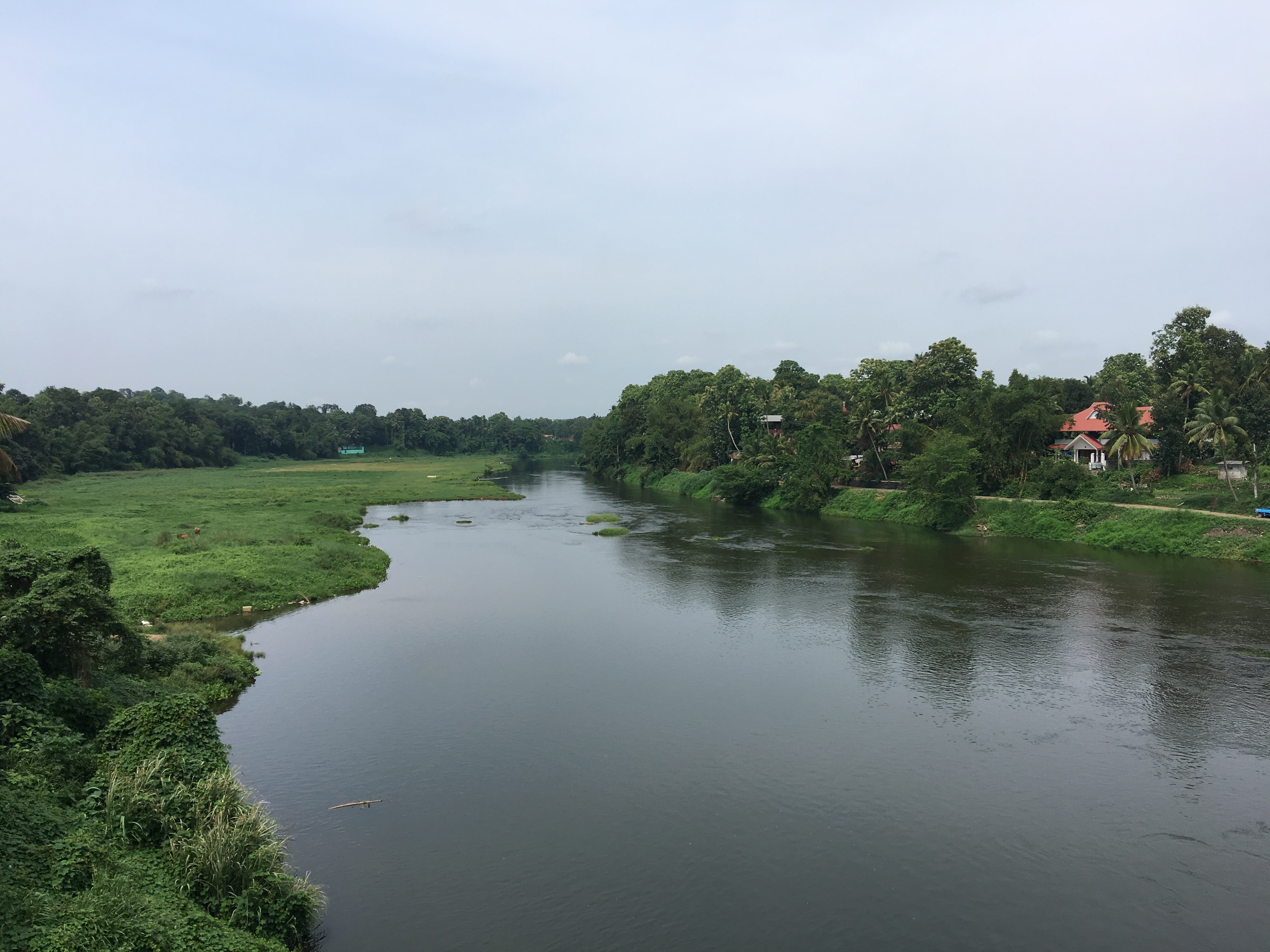
View of Pampa River from Kozhencherry

Kozhencherry is located in central Travancore and at the heart of Pathanamthitta District. It lies along the banks of the sacred Pampa River, which originates from Sabarimala and is surrounded by hills and lush green valleys. The town's history is deeply intertwined with that of Central Travancore.

The land of Kozhencherry is highly fertile, supporting the cultivation of plantations, paddy, tapioca, coconut, rubber, pepper, sugarcane, vegetables, spices, and more. In the past, goods from the Kozhencherry market were transported to Kochi and Alappuzha via the Pampa River in large boats. In 1869, during the reign of Sree Moolam Thirunal, resident Mr. G.A. Bellard initiated a public market, which later became known as the Bellard Public Market. This highlights Kozhencherry's significant role in ancient trade. The town was also closely linked to banking and cooperative societies, with Malankara Syndicate Bank being a pioneer in Travancore.

On 11 May 1935, Sri C. Kesavan called for the opening of roads and schools to the public, the cessation of Divanji's rule, and the establishment of democratic governance during a public meeting in Kozhencherry. This call to action spurred public involvement in the Freedom Struggle alongside Mahatma Gandhi. Keshavan was subsequently arrested and imprisoned. A stone monument in the town center commemorates this event.

In education, Kozhencherry has made significant contributions to central Travancore. St. Thomas High School was established in 1910, attracting students from various regions. St. Thomas College followed in 1953. Recognizing Kozhencherry's prominence, a district hospital was founded over 112 years ago by the rulers. Additionally, Kozhencherry Panchayath was established in 1953.

== Demographics ==
According to the 2011 Census of India, Kozhencherry had a population of 12,021, with 5,594 males and 6,427 females. The town boasts a high literacy rate of 96.57%, exceeding Kerala's state average of 94%.

The sex ratio of Kozhencherry stands at 1,149 females per 1,000 males, which is notably higher than the state average. The town has a predominantly Christian population (50.48%), followed closely by Hindus (48.86%), with smaller percentages of Muslims (0.27%) and other religious groups.

== Geography ==
The total area of this village includes hill areas, plain lands, semi-hill areas, and paddy fields.

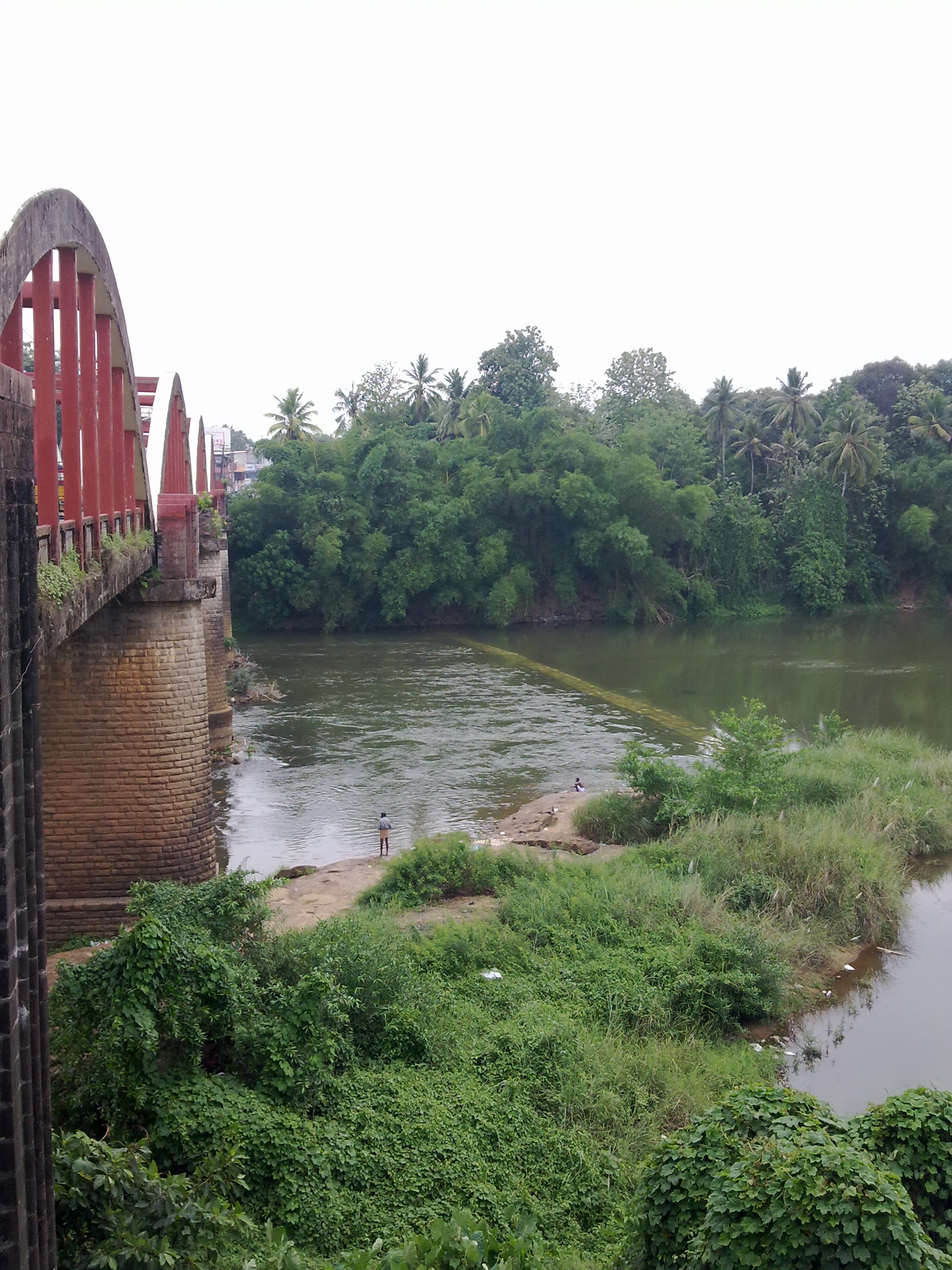
Bridge view during the early stage of 2018 Kerala floods

== Climate ==
Climate data for Kozhenchery, Kerala
Month	Jan	Feb	Mar	Apr	May	Jun	Jul	Aug	Sep	Oct	Nov	Dec	Year
Mean daily maximum °C (°F)	31.6 (88.9)	33.2 (91.8)	33.3 (91.9)	31.6 (88.9)	30 (86)	28.1 (82.6)	27.8 (82.0)	27.9 (82.2)	28.5 (83.3)	28.7 (83.7)	28.9 (84.0)	29.8 (85.6)	30.0 (85.9)
Mean daily minimum °C (°F)	21.5 (70.7)	22.2 (72.0)	22.6 (72.7)	22.8 (73.0)	22.9 (73.2)	23 (73)	23.4 (74.1)	24.1 (75.4)	24 (75)	22.4 (72.3)	23.4 (74.1)	22.5 (72.5)	22.9 (73.2)
Average precipitation mm (inches)	32 (1.3)	35 (1.4)	44 (1.7)	61 (2.4)	77 (3.0)	360 (14.2)	273 (10.7)	219 (8.6)	328 (12.9)	274 (10.8)	99 (3.9)	94 (3.7)	1,896 (74.6)
Source: Climate-Data.org

== Administration ==
Kozhencherry is part of Pathanamthitta district. Before the formation of the Pathanamthitta district in 1982, Kozhencherry belonged to Kollam district.

== Tourism ==
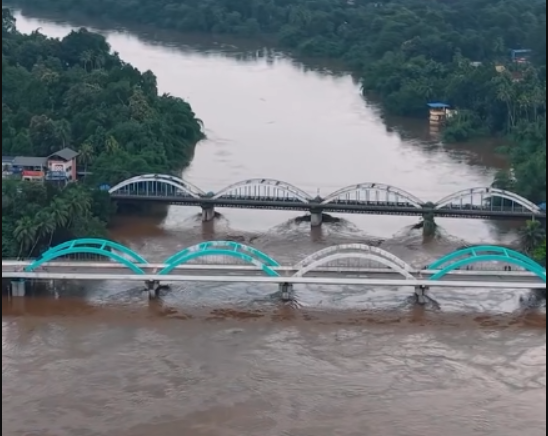
Bridge during 2026 Kerala floods

The very famous Maramon Convention conducted in this village at the sand bed of pampa river. The statue of C. KESAVAN, famous for Kozhencherry speech during Freedom Fight is very near to Village office. District Tourism Promotion Councils (DTPC) office is in Kozhencherry village near Panchayath stadium. The St. Thomas Marthoma Church, Kozhencherry is a prominent Christian church belonging to the Malankara Mar Thoma Syrian Church. This church is one of the oldest in Kerala, having been established in AD 1599. There is no other tourism spot in this village.

== Education ==
- St. Thomas College, Kozhencherry
- St. Mary's Girls High School, Kozhencherry
- St. Thomas Higher Secondary School, Kozhencherry

== Transport ==
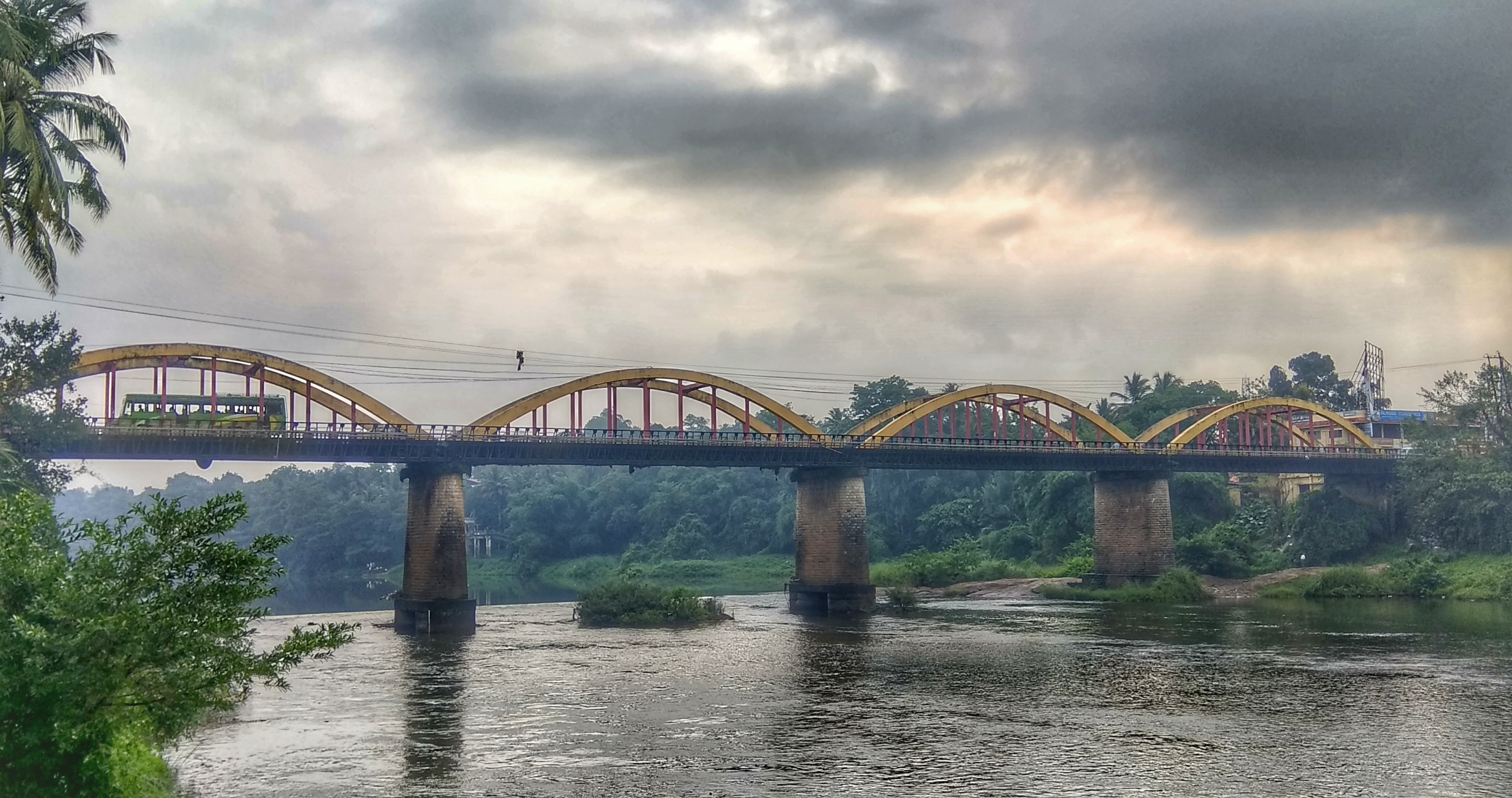
Kozhencherry is famous for Kozhencherry Bridge which is built in 1930s

Kozhencherry primarily relies on private buses and many long-distance Kerala State Road Transport Corporation (KSRTC) buses. Auto rickshaws are also commonly used and are typically hired for short distances (1–3 km) in areas not serviced by buses. Jeeps are favored for transportation in hilly or rugged terrains.

The nearest railway stations are at Thiruvalla 17.7 km (11.0 mi) and Chengannur which are nearly 15.2 km (9.4 mi) away.

The proposed Sabarimala International Airport, Cheruvally would be the closest airport upon completion, at 31 km (19 mi) from Kozhencherry township.

The nearest extant airports are Trivandrum International Airport, at 111.5 km (69.3 mi) and Cochin International Airport at 135 km (84 mi).

== Hospitals ==
- Poyanil Hospital
- Mulamoottil Eye Hospital & Research Center
- Muthoot Hospitals Kozhencherry
- District Hospital, Kozhencherry

== Notable people ==
- Mathai George Muthoot - entrepreneur and businessman
- George Alexander Muthoot - entrepreneur and businessman
- M. G. George Muthoot - entrepreneur and businessman

== See also ==
- Kozhencherry East
- Pathanamthitta District
