= Kauser Edappagath =

Indian judge of the Kerala High Court

The Honourable Dr. Justice Kauser Edappagath
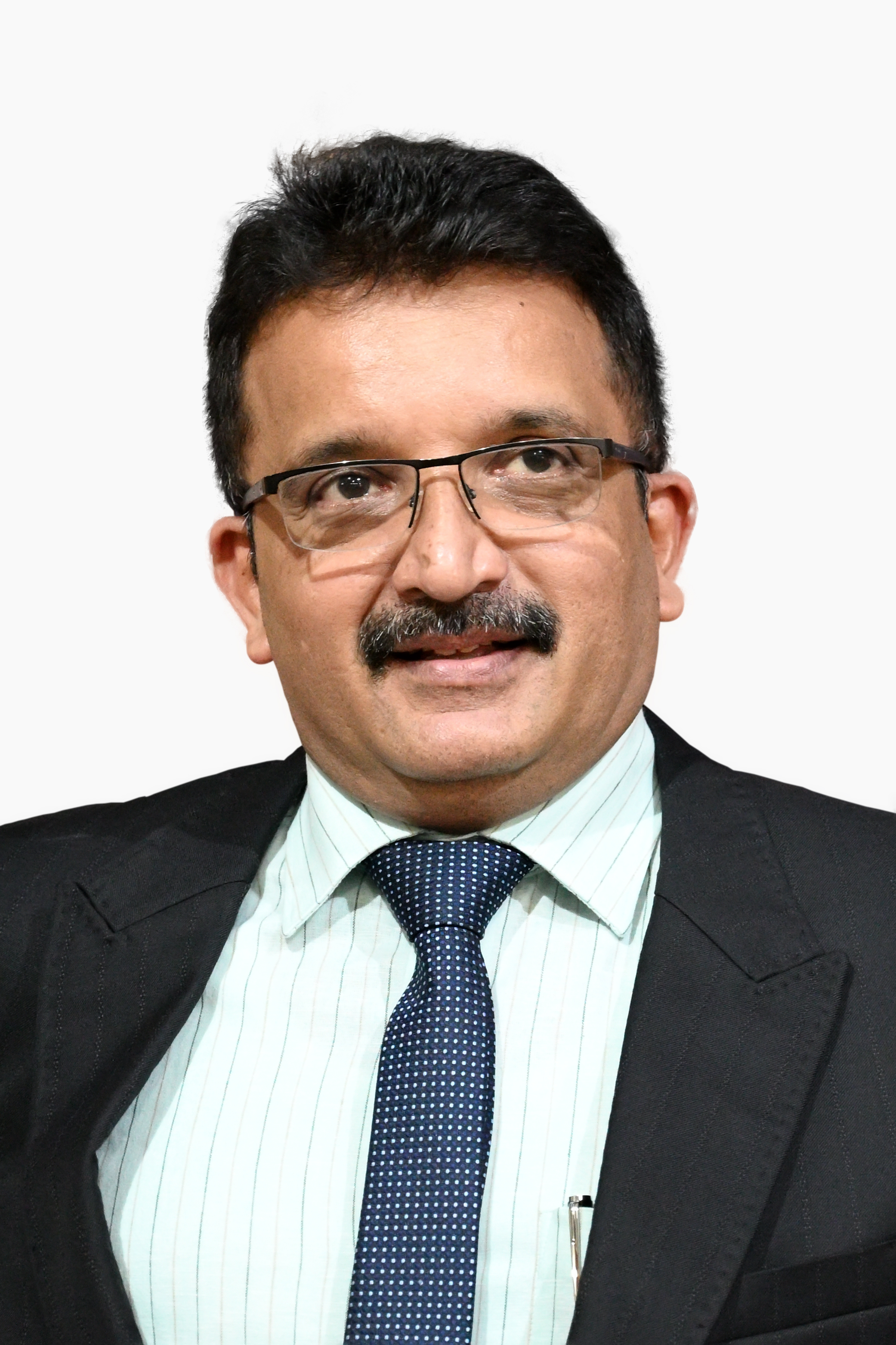

Judge of the Kerala High Court
- Incumbent
- Assumed office 25 February 2021
- Nominated by: Sharad Arvind Bobde
- Appointed by: Ram Nath Kovind

Principal District and Sessions Judge of Ernakulam District
- In office 2018–2021

Personal details
- Born: 25 May 1968 (age 58) India
- Parent: P.K Mahamood (father)
- Education: Ph.D in Law
- Alma mater: Government Law College, Kozhikode
- Website: High Court of Kerala

Kauser Edappagath is an Indian judge serving as a judge of Kerala High Court. Headquartered at Ernakulam, Kochi, the High Court of Kerala is the highest court in the Indian state of Kerala and in the Union Territory of Lakshadweep. Edappagath was the Principal District and Sessions Judge, Ernakulam before being appointed as a Kerala High Court judge.

== Early life and education ==
Edappagath was born in Kerala. He completed his schooling from M.M. Uloom U.P. School, Kannur and Government City High School, Kannur. He graduated from Sir Syed College (Taliparamba), obtained law degree from Government Law College, Kozhikode and post graduation in law in Contracts from Mahatma Gandhi University, Kerala.

== Career ==
After enrollment Edappagath started his practice at Kannur and later extended to High Court of Kerala in 2002 and in 1997 he along with A. Muhamed Mustaque established a law firm named MK Associates. In 2005 he has finished International Accredited Mediation Training Course conducted jointly by Mediation Council, U.K., ADR Chamber, U.K. and Hamline University School of Law in association with Indian Institute of Arbitration and Mediation. In 2007 he did his paper presentation at International Family Law Conference organized by International Islamic University Malaysia held at Kuala Lumpur, Malaysia. He was awarded Ph.D in Law by the Indian Law Institute, New Delhi in 2012. He was directly recruited from Bar as District and Sessions Judge in 2009. Thereafter, he served as Additional District and Sessions Judge at Thiruvananthapuram, Additional District and Sessions Judge/Forest Tribunal at Kozhikode, as Special Judge, CBI/NIA and Principal District and Sessions Judge/State Transport Appellate Tribunal, Ernakulam from where he was elevated as Additional Judge of High Court of Kerala on 25.02.2021 and became permanent judge from 06.06.2022.

== Notable rulings ==
=== COVID-19 pandemic ===
In 2021 Vacation Bench of Kerala High Court, consisting of Justice Devan Ramachandran and Justice Edapagath took up several important issues with respect to the COVID-19 pandemic such as banning of victory and congratulatory processions/parades of all political parties after the State Legislature election results were announced on 02.05.2021, suo motu directed State Police Chief to avoid crowding of people at all Vaccination centres and issued various directions to Government to control private hospitals and to regulate their treatment costs and a suggestion was also made by the bench to take over 50% beds of all private hospitals for COVID patients. A timely intervention was made by the bench consisting of Justice Mustaque and Justice Edapagath directing the State Government to include the practicing lawyers and advocate clerks in the priority list of COVID-19 vaccination list pointing out that purpose of inclusion of the judicial officers and staffs would become meaningless if the practicing lawyers and clerks are not included and in the very same judgment, the bench considered the concern pointed out by a single bench of the High Court regarding the measures to be taken by the concerned police officer for protection of Senior Citizen living alone and having no assistance from others shall be served with due care and assistance pointing out the death of a senior citizen happened in Palakkad, and bench consisting of Justice Edapagath directed the State Government to ensure the care and protection as envisaged under the Maintenance and Welfare of Parents and Senior Citizens Act, 2007 and to made available the vaccination at the residence of the Senior Citizen and bedridden patients.

=== Media trial in criminal case ===
In 2023, a larger bench headed by Justice Jayasankaran Nambiar with Justices Edappagath, Justice Mohammed Nias C. P, Justice C.S. Sudha and Justice Syam Kumar V. M. ruled as media commentary declaring an accused guilty or innocent while a criminal case is pending is not protected speech under Article 19(1)(a) of the Constitution of India, as it must be balanced against the individual’s right to dignity, reputation and a fair trial under Article 21 and specifically observed as “media freedom does not grant a license to interfere with the justice delivery system.” and the risk of “trial by media” skewing public perception of the outcome of pending cases.

== Bibliography ==
- Divorce and Gender Equity in Muslim Personal Law of India - 2014.
