= Bhaderwah Rajmash =

Indian common bean variety

Bhaderwah Rajmash also known as Bhaderwahi Rajma, is a variety of common bean (Phaseolus vulgaris) cultivated in the Chenab Valley region of Jammu Jammu and Kashmir, India. It is primarily grown in the Bhaderwah and Chinta Valley areas of Doda district, as well as parts of Kishtwar and Ramban districts.

The crop is known for its small seed size, deep reddish-maroon colour, sweet taste, soft texture after cooking, and high digestibility. It is traditionally cultivated at elevations between 1,300 and 1,900 metres above sea level under temperate climatic conditions. Farmers commonly grow the crop through intercropping with maize, using maize stalks as natural support for the climbing bean plants.

== Geography ==
Bhaderwah Rajmash is cultivated across the Chenab Valley, a mountainous region comprising the districts of Doda, Kishtwar, and Ramban. The Chinta Valley near Bhaderwah is regarded as one of the most important cultivation zones due to its favourable climate, fertile soils, and traditional farming practices.

== Cultivation ==
The crop is sown during April and May and harvested between August and September. Cultivation relies largely on organic manure and traditional farming methods. Farmers preserve seeds from selected plants for future sowing, contributing to the development of locally adapted landraces.

Intercropping with maize is a characteristic feature of cultivation. The system improves soil fertility, reduces erosion, and increases farm productivity.

== Characteristics ==
Bhaderwah Rajmash differs from many commercial kidney bean varieties by its:

- Small and compact seed size
- Deep red-maroon colour
- Sweet and nutty flavour
- Creamy texture after cooking
- High digestibility

The beans are widely valued for their culinary quality and are often considered among the finest rajma varieties produced in India.

== Geographical indication ==
On 30 August 2023, Bhaderwah Rajmash received a Geographical Indication (GI) tag from the Government of India. The registration recognized the crop's unique geographical origin and traditional cultivation practices. The GI tag also provides legal protection against misuse of the name by producers outside the designated cultivation area.

== Culinary use ==
Bhaderwah Rajmash is commonly prepared as rajma chawal, a dish consisting of cooked beans served with rice. In the Chenab Valley, it is traditionally accompanied by desi ghee and anardana (dried pomegranate seed) chutney. The dish is closely associated with the region's food culture and is widely served in roadside eateries and dhabas.

== Economic importance ==
The crop is an important source of income for small and marginal farmers in the Chenab Valley. Due to its reputation for quality, Bhaderwah Rajmash commands higher market prices than many ordinary kidney bean varieties. Following GI recognition, efforts have been made to promote its branding and marketing in domestic and international markets.

== See also ==
- Geographical indications in India
