= Kerala State Legal Services Authority =

- Abbreviation: KeLSA
- Headquarters: Niyama Sahaya Bhavan, High Court Compound, Kochi, Kerala, India
- Official language: Malayalam, English
- Patron in Chief: Soumen Sen (The Chief Justice, High Court of Kerala)
- Executive Chairman: A. K. Jayasankaran Nambiar, (Judge, High Court of Kerala)
- Chairman: Devan Ramachandran, (Judge, High Court of Kerala)
- Member Secretary: Anil K Bhaskar, District and Sessions Judge
- Website: KeLSA.nic.in

Kerala State Legal Services Authority is the statutory body that provides free legal aid to the people of the state of Kerala, India. It is one among the several state Legal Services Authorities in India which were constituted following the Legal Services Authorities Act of 1987.

== See also ==
- Department of Law (Kerala)
- Directorate of Prosecution (Kerala)
- Office of the Advocate General, Kerala
