= Joseph Koorilose IX =

His Beatitude Joseph Mar Koorilose IX
- Metropolitan of Thozhiyoor
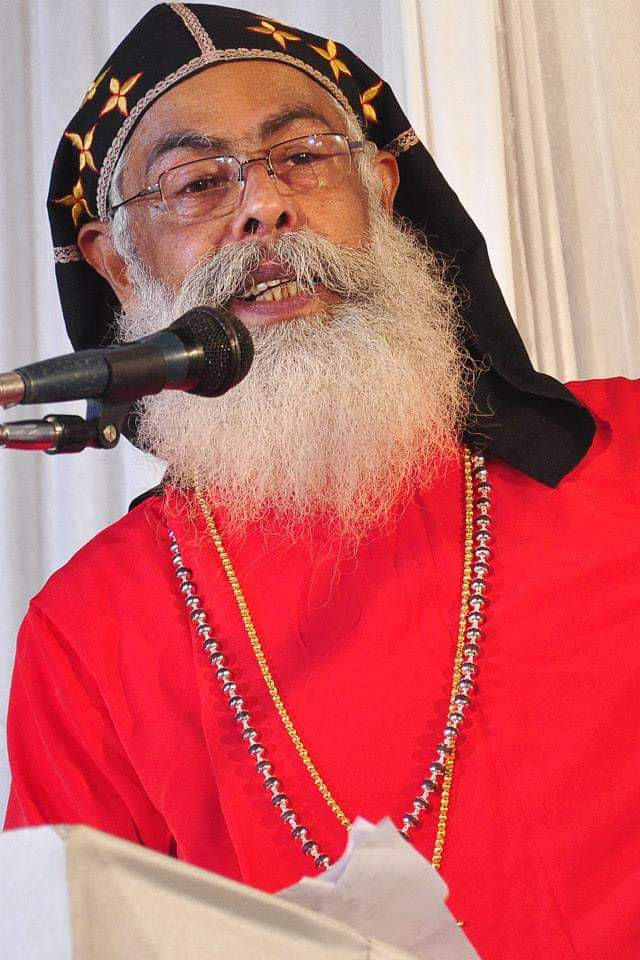
- Native name: ജോസഫ് മാർ കൂറിലോസ്
- Church: Malabar Independent Syrian Church
- Installed: 27 August 1986
- Term ended: 28 May 2001
- Predecessor: Mathews Mar Koorilose VIII
- Successor: Cyril Baselios I
- Other post: Valiya Metropolitan (2001–2014)

Orders
- Ordination: 1 March 1978
- Consecration: 27 August 1986 by Alexander Mar Thoma

Personal details
- Born: Joseph Panakkal; 26 November 1954 Kunnamkulam, Travancore-Cochin (now Kerala), India
- Died: 9 September 2014 (aged 59) Kunnamkulam, Kerala, India
- Parents: P. I. Mathewkutty and Kunjhani
- Education: St. Thomas College, Thrissur; Municipal College of Education, Chickballapur

Joseph Mar Koorilose IX (born Joseph Panakkal; 26 November 1954 – 9 September 2014), also known as Valiya Thirumeni, was an Indian prelate who served as the 13th Metropolitan of the Malabar Independent Syrian Church (MISC) from 1986 to 2001. Following his retirement from active administration, he served as the first Valiya Metropolitan (Senior Metropolitan) of the church until his death in 2014.

== Early life and education ==
Joseph Panakkal was born in Kunnamkulam to P. I. Mathewkutty, a retired Havildar Major, and Kunjhani. His family, the Alathoor-Panakkal household, has a long-standing history within the MISC, having produced Metropolitan Joseph Mar Koorilose IV (r. 1856–1888) and the Suffragan Metropolitan Paulose Mar Athanasios (died 1927).

He received his primary education at David Memorial L.P. School and secondary education at M.J.D. High School. He attended Sri Krishna College, Guruvayur, for his pre-degree course and obtained a Bachelor of Arts in History and English from St. Thomas College, Thrissur. In 1979, he earned a Bachelor of Education from the Municipal College of Education in Chickballapur, Karnataka.

== Ministry and election ==
Joseph was ordained to the sub diaconate in 1972 and as a priest on 1 March 1978 by Mathews Mar Koorilose VIII. He served as the Vicar of Kallumpuram parish and as a teacher at St. George's High School, Thozhiyur. In 1984, he founded the Church's Youth League (MISC Youth League) and served as the founding editor of its publication, Sneha Sandesham.

On 20 December 1981, at age 27, he was elected as bishop-elect by the Church General Body. Following the death of Mathews Mar Koorilose VIII in 1986, he was raised to the rank of Ramban by Philipose Mar Chrysostom. He was consecrated as Metropolitan on 27 August 1986 by Alexander Mar Thoma, with participation from prelates of the Mar Thoma Syrian Church and the Church of the East.

=== International relations ===
He was the first Metropolitan in the church's history to travel outside India.

- In 1988, he visited Jordan and Syria, meeting Patriarch Ignatius Zakka I Iwas.
- In 1989 and 1991, he visited the United Kingdom, meeting Archbishops of Canterbury Robert Runcie and George Carey.
- In 1998, he participated in the Lambeth Conference as an Ecumenical Participant.

=== 1997 stroke and recovery ===
On 4 September 1997, he suffered a severe brainstem stroke in Kunnamkulam. Despite a medical prognosis requiring long-term ventilation, he regained consciousness within two days and eventually resumed his full ecclesiastical duties.

== Valiya Metropolitan and Death ==
Citing hearing difficulties, Mar Koorilose IX consecrated Cyril Baselios I as his successor on 17 March 2001. This was the first direct consecration by an MISC Metropolitan in 84 years. On 28 May 2001, he was installed as the church's first Valiya Metropolitan (Senior Metropolitan).

He died on 9 September 2014 at a hospital in Kunnamkulam, aged 59. He was interred at St. George's Cathedral, Thozhiyur.
