= A. K. Jayasankaran Nambiar =

Indian judge

The Honourable Dr. Justice A. K. Jayasankaran Nambiar
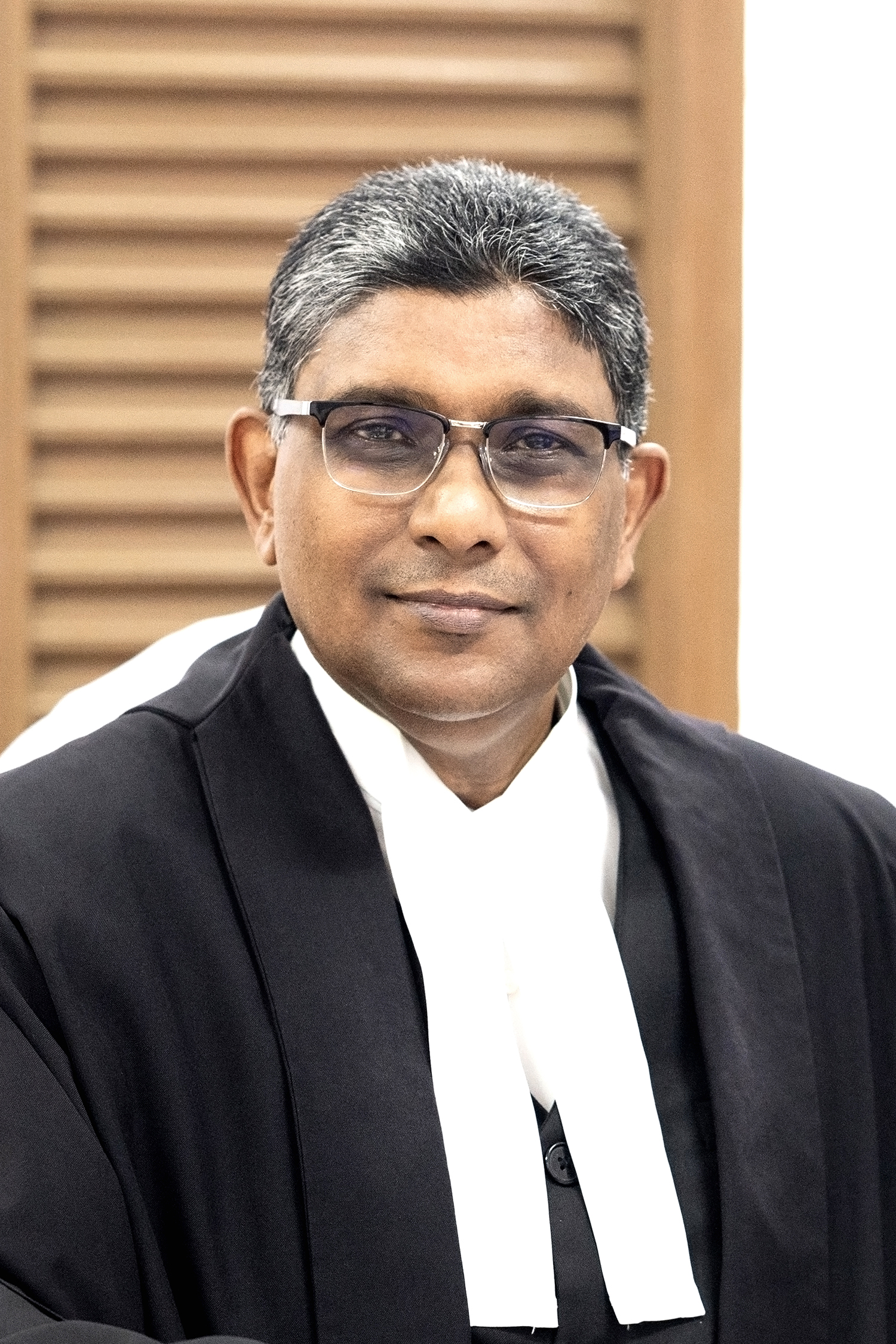

Judge of Kerala High Court
- Incumbent
- Assumed office 23 January 2014
- Nominated by: P. Sathasivam
- Appointed by: Pranab Mukherjee

Personal details
- Pronunciation: A. K. Jayasankaran Nambiar എ. കെ. ജയശങ്കരൻ നമ്പ്യാർ
- Born: 27 January 1966 (age 60) Ernakulam, Kerala
- Citizenship: Indian
- Spouse: Indu Nambiar
- Parents: Justice K. A. Nayar (father); Chandralekha Nayar (mother)
- Education: Ph.D in Law by O. P. Jindal Global University
- Alma mater: Government Law College, Ernakulam; University of Oxford
- Website: High Court of Kerala

Dr. Justice A. K. Jayasankaran Nambiar (born 27 January 1966) is an Indian jurist and scholar serving as a judge of the Kerala High Court, since January 2014. The court is headquartered at Ernakulam, Kochi. In January 2026, he became the senior-most puisne judge of the High Court of Kerala. He also serves as the Executive Chairman of the Kerala State Legal Services Authority (KeLSA), having been nominated to the office by the Governor of Kerala in early 2026.

== Early life and education ==
Nambiar was born on 27 January 1966 in Ernakulam, Kerala to Justice K. A. Nayar, former judge of the Kerala High Court and Smt. Chandralekha Nambiar. He completed his secondary schooling from Lawrence School, Lovedale in Tamil Nadu, and went on to earn a Bachelor of Science degree in chemistry from Sacred Heart College, Thevara. He then studied law at Government Law College, Ernakulam (affiliated to Mahatma Gandhi University, Kottayam), graduating with an LL.B. and securing the first rank in the university examinations, for which he was awarded the N. Govinda Menon Memorial Gold Medal.

Nambiar subsequently read law at Jesus College, University of Oxford in the United Kingdom, obtaining a Master of Arts (M.A. Oxon.) degree. In 2023, Nambiar was awarded a Doctor of Philosophy in Law by O. P. Jindal Global University, having enrolled in the doctoral programme during the COVID-19 lockdown period. His thesis, “The Judicial Role in Constitutional Protection: Examining the Legitimacy of Basic Structure Review in India,” was conferred at a convocation ceremony in New Delhi.

== Career ==
Nambiar enrolled as an advocate in 1990 and began practicing in Ernakulam district with M/s. Menon & Pai Advocates. He specialized in constitutional law and in direct and indirect taxation, building a substantial practice before the High Court of Kerala. In July 2011, he was designated a Senior Advocate by the High Court of Kerala.

Nambiar was sworn in as an Additional Judge of the High Court of Kerala on 23 January 2014, and was appointed a Permanent Judge with effect from 10 March 2016. In January 2026, under the chief justiceship of Justice Soumen Sen, he became the senior-most puisne judge of the High Court of Kerala. He has also served as the Administrative Judge for the Union Territory of Lakshadweep. In February 2026, Nambiar was nominated as the Executive Chairman of the Kerala State Legal Services Authority (KeLSA) by the Governor of Kerala. In March 2026, he was appointed to a high-level National Legal Services Authority (NALSA) committee tasked with reviewing the Legal Aid Defense Counsel System (LADCS) scheme across the country.

== Notable rulings ==
=== Premature Release of Prisoners ===
In 2019, during the hearing of a petition filed by the wife of a prisoner who was not considered for remission of sentence, a full bench consisting of the then Chief Justice Hrishikesh Roy, Justice K Abraham Mathew and Justice Nambiar, quashed an order of 2011 issued by the State Government allowing premature release of 209 convicts. The full bench directed a re-examination of the prisoners' case with an observation to consider the conduct of the released prisoners over the last 7 years since they were released and decide the case in accordance with the law.

=== COVID-19 pandemic ===
During the early COVID-19 lockdown, a Division Bench of Justice Nambiar and Justice Shaji P Chaly directed the Central Government to ensure the removal of road blockades erected by the Karnataka government on Kasaragod–Mangaluru Highway at the Kerala border. The Bench held that a State cannot invoke territorial jurisdiction as a defence to deny citizens of another State access to emergency medical care, food, and other essential services. Emphasising the constitutional vision embodied in Article 1 of the Constitution, the Court observed that India is a "Union of States" and that every State is under a constitutional obligation to respect and protect the fundamental rights of all Indian citizens, irrespective of their State of residence or domicile. The Bench declared that when a High Court holds the actions of another State Government to be illegal and unconstitutional, the latter is constitutionally expected to give due deference to that declaration of law.

=== Animal rights ===
==== Pets in apartments ====
In 2021, a bench consisting of Justice Nambiar and Justice Gopinath ruled that bylaws banning pets in apartments and resident associations was illegal and unconstitutional and pointed out the guidelines issued by the Animal Welfare Board of India in February 2015 with respect to pet-owning residents could be adopted by the residents associations while prescribing conditions for keeping of pets in the apartments.

==== Tranlocation of Arikomban ====
In March 2023 the Bench of Justice Nambiar and Justice Gopinath prevented the Kerala Forest Department from capturing and taming Kumki elephants at the Kodanad Elephant Center in Ernakulam district. The Bench appointed an expert committee to investigate the matter, which recommended moving the elephant to the Parambikulam Tiger Reserve, a wilderness region with no possibility of human–elephant conflict. The Kerala government was then instructed by the Bench to release Arikomban in a location chosen by the government while concealing the location. The Bench then instructed the forest department to follow the elephant, tranquillize it, and then fasten a radio collar around its neck to monitor its activities.

=== Proceedings against the Popular Front of India ===
In 2022, pointing out various Articles in the Constitution of India, the bench consisting of Justice Nambiar and Justice Mohammed Nias initiated suo motu contempt of court proceedings against Popular Front of India for calling a strike on 23 September 2022 without seven days notice in connection with the nationwide raids on Popular Front of India offices and arrests of its leaders by the National Investigation Agency and causing damage to public properties and Kerala State Road Transport Corporation. The bench directed the organisation and its officials to deposit an initial compensation of Rs. 5.2 crores (Rs. 52 million) with the State Government, towards the damages caused in the illegal strike. In December 2022 the State Government tendered an unconditional apology to the bench for delays in executing the recovery orders issued by the bench.

=== Media trial in criminal case ===
In 2023, a larger bench headed by Justice Nambiar with Justices Kauser Edappagath, Justice Mohammed Nias C. P, C. S. Sudha and Justice Syam Kumar V. M. ruled that media commentary declaring an accused guilty or innocent while a criminal case is pending is not protected speech under Article 19(1)(a) of the Constitution of India, as it must be balanced against the individual's right to dignity, reputation and a fair trial under Article 21 and specifically observed that“media freedom does not grant a license to interfere with the justice delivery system.” and the risk of “trial by media” skewing public perception of the outcome of pending cases.

=== Disasters in Kerala ===
Justice Nambiar has, on various occasions, been part of Benches that considered the judicial response to natural disasters in Kerala.

==== 2018 Kerala floods ====
Following the severe floods that affected the State of Kerala, due to unusually heavy rainfall during the monsoon season, the bench of the then Chief Justice Hrishikesh Roy and Justice Nambiar put forward suggestions to the State Government on relief and rehabilitation measures following the catastrophic Kerala floods of August 2018, while hearing a public interest litigation alleging that relief was not adequately reaching those affected

==== 2024 Wayanad landslides ====
Following a series of landslides that occurred in Punjirimattom, Mundakkai, Chooralmala, and Vellarimala villages in Wayanad on 30 July 2024, which resulted in 254 fatalities, 397 injuries and 118 people missing, a Division Bench of Justice Nambiar and Justice Syam Kumar registered a suo motu case and issued a series of directions to the Union and State Government including on disbursing compensation through bank accounts, ensuring that the Model Code of Conduct for elections did not impede relief work, and pressing the Centre and the National Disaster Management Authority (India) to consider waiving the loan dues of landslide victims. On various occasions, Justice Nambiar, sat with different companion judges, including Justice Easwaran S., Justice Jobin Sebastian, Justice K. V. Jayakumar and Justice Preeta A.K., and continued judicial monitoring of the rehabilitation measures in Wayanad. Bench of Justice Nambiar and Justice Preeta A.K. issued directions for early disbursement of ex gratia compensation to the landslide victims and to bear the medical expenses of injured until their discharge.

== Academic contributions and publications ==
=== Constitutional scholarship ===
Nambiar's doctoral dissertation, "The Judicial Role in Constitutional Protection: Examining the Legitimacy of Basic Structure Review in India" (2023), provides a comprehensive legal and philosophical defense of the Basic Structure doctrine. The work analyzes the doctrinal evolution and legitimacy of judicial review, proposing an upgraded template for the judiciary to minimize arbitrariness while maintaining constitutional equilibrium in an era driven by public demands for governance transparency.

=== Peer-reviewed legal articles ===
- Property Rights in India: In 2025, Nambiar authored a comprehensive research treatise titled "Property Rights In India: Constitutional Ideals vs Legal Realities" published in the Cochin University Law Review (Vol. XLIX). The article charts the historical and constitutional trajectory of property rights from fundamental status to its demotion via the 44th Amendment to Article 300A, exploring contemporary transitions wherein courts view property rights through the lens of human rights under Article 21, as well as analyzing recent landmark rulings like the Property Owners Association (2024) case.
- Human-Animal Conflict: Nambiar authored a comprehensive academic paper titled "Close Encounters of the Quadruped Kind: Towards a Duty Based Approach to Human-Animal Conflict Resolution in India" published in the Journal of the Indian Law Institute (Vol. 64, Oct.–Dec. 2022, pp. 429–435). The paper advocates for an eco-centric duty-based approach over western anthropocentric rights frameworks, drawing upon the constitutional paradigm of fundamental duties to balance the competing rights of humans and animals in conflict environments.
- Constitutional Interpretation: Nambiar authored an extensive scholarly article titled "Re-Imagining Constitutional Interpretation in India" published in the Journal of the Indian Law Institute (Vol. 65, No. 2, Apr.–June 2023, pp. 157–179). The treatise explores alternative jurisprudential methodologies that depart from traditional literalism, advocating for a dynamic framework where text, structural constitutional values, intersectionality, and collective civic responsibilities converge to guide progressive public law adjudication.

=== Public essays and judicial reforms ===
Nambiar has authored several influential essays detailing systemic issues within the Indian legal machinery:

- Judicial Infrastructure and Recruitment: Writing for The Week magazine in August 2024, he analyzed the socio-political stabilizing power of the Constitution, detailing an urgent blueprint to design a "futuristic" judiciary. He highlighted stark disparities in the judge-to-population ratio (noting India possessed roughly 21 judges per million citizens compared to 210 in Europe), calling for merit-based, socially representative recruitment, structured interdisciplinary continuing education for judges, insulation of judicial execution from executive dependency, and raising state budgetary allocations for judicial infrastructure beyond the typical sub-two percent allocation.
- Intersectionality in Indian Law: In September 2025, he published an essay titled "India's tryst with intersectionality" in The Week. Drawing on Kimberlé Crenshaw's theories, he argued that Indian jurisprudence traditionally viewed discrimination via homogenous binaries, failing to address the compounded disadvantages faced by citizens at the intersection of multiple groundings like caste, sex, disability, and ethnicity. He cited the Supreme Court's rulings in Patan Jamal Vali and Davinder Singh as positive markers toward an inclusive equality model under Articles 14, 15, and 16.
- Anatomy of Criminal Trials: In November 2025, his essay "The Anatomy of a Criminal Trial" dissected popular media misconceptions of the criminal justice system. He explains the functioning of the criminal justice system from investigation to final adjudication, emphasizing the high standard of proof required for conviction and the procedural safeguards available to an accused. He highlights the challenges confronting criminal courts, including delays, inadequate infrastructure, shortage of judges, prosecutors and forensic resources, while underscoring the need for greater public understanding of the judicial process and increased investment in the justice delivery system.

=== International and dispute resolution forums ===
Nambiar maintains active connections with international academic and legal circles, particularly within the University of Oxford's comparative constitutional law wings. In August 2023, he was invited as a primary judicial speaker at the International Bar Association (IBA) India Dispute Resolution Symposium in New Delhi, where he addressed global delegates on systemic judicial backlogs, international best practices in alternative dispute resolution (ADR), and structural upgrades in cross-border commercial arbitration.
