= St. Thomas College, Thrissur =

College in Thrissur, Kerala

Coordinates: 10.52301°N 76.21942°E

St. Thomas' College (Autonomous), Thrissur
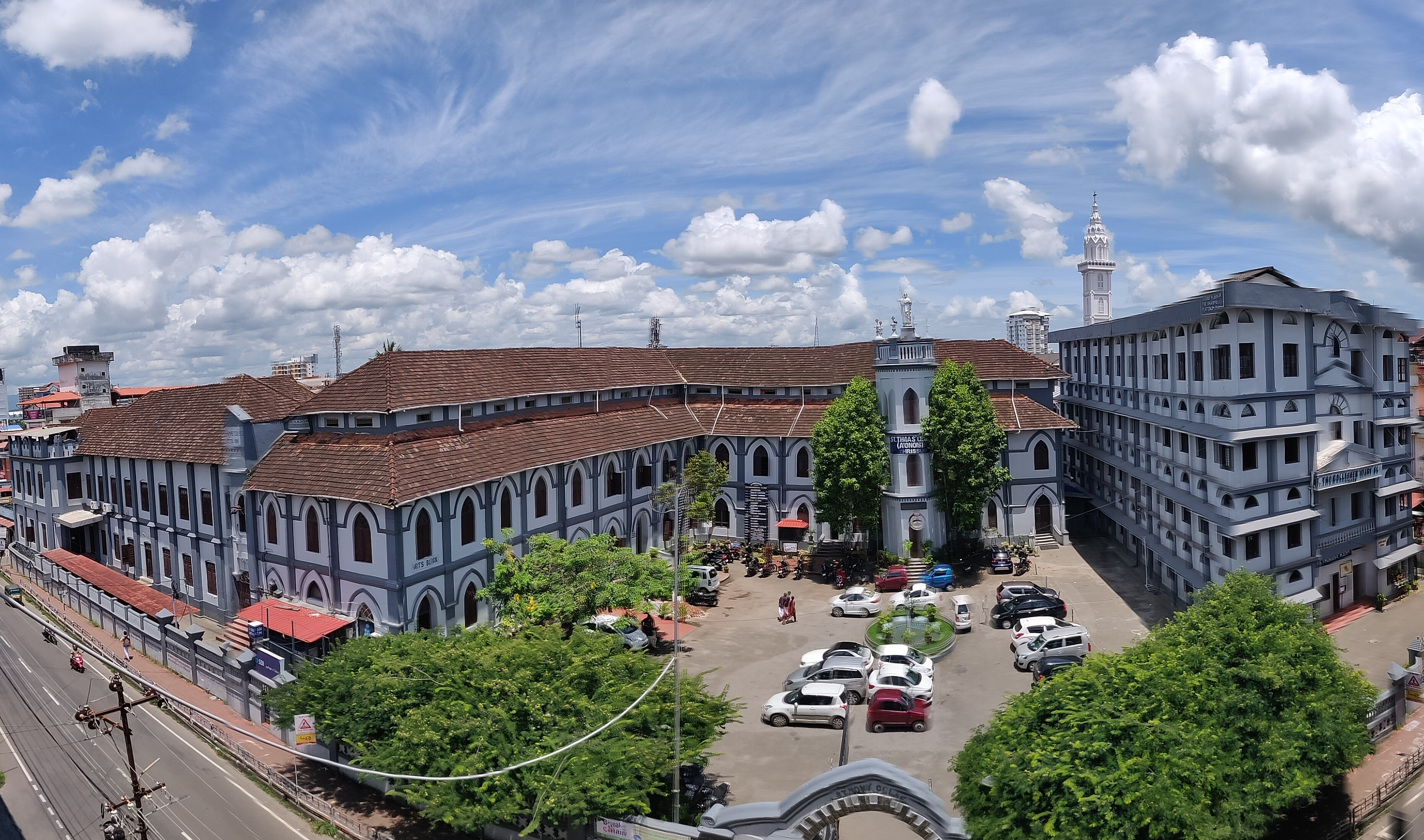
- Administration Block of St Thomas' College
- Motto: Veritas Vos Liberabit
- Motto in English: The truth will set you free
- Type: Government Aided College
- Established: 1918; 108 years ago
- Founder: Mar Adolph Medlycott
- Religious affiliation: Syro-Malabar Catholic Church
- Academic affiliations: University of Calicut
- Principal: Martin K. A.
- Faculty: 200
- Administrative staff: 70
- Students: 3470
- Undergraduates: 2850
- Postgraduates: 480
- Doctoral students: 140
- Location: Thrissur, Kerala, India
- Campus: Urban
- Nickname: STC
- Website: stthomas.ac.in

St. Thomas College (Autonomous), Thrissur, is a government-aided Catholic college located in Thrissur, Kerala, India. Established as a college in 1918, the college is considered to be one of the oldest and premier institutions of higher education in Princely State of Cochin. It is the first Catholic college in Kerala and is conducted by the Syro-Malabar Catholic Archdiocese of Thrissur. The college is affiliated with the University of Calicut.

The college attained Autonomous status in 2014 and was recognised as College with Potential for Excellence by University Grants Commission in 2016. The college was accredited with A++ grade in its fourth cycle of National Assessment and Accreditation Council (NAAC) accreditation, scoring CGPA of 3.70 on a four-point scale in October 2022. It is ranked 57th among colleges in India by the National Institutional Ranking Framework (NIRF) in 2024.

== History ==
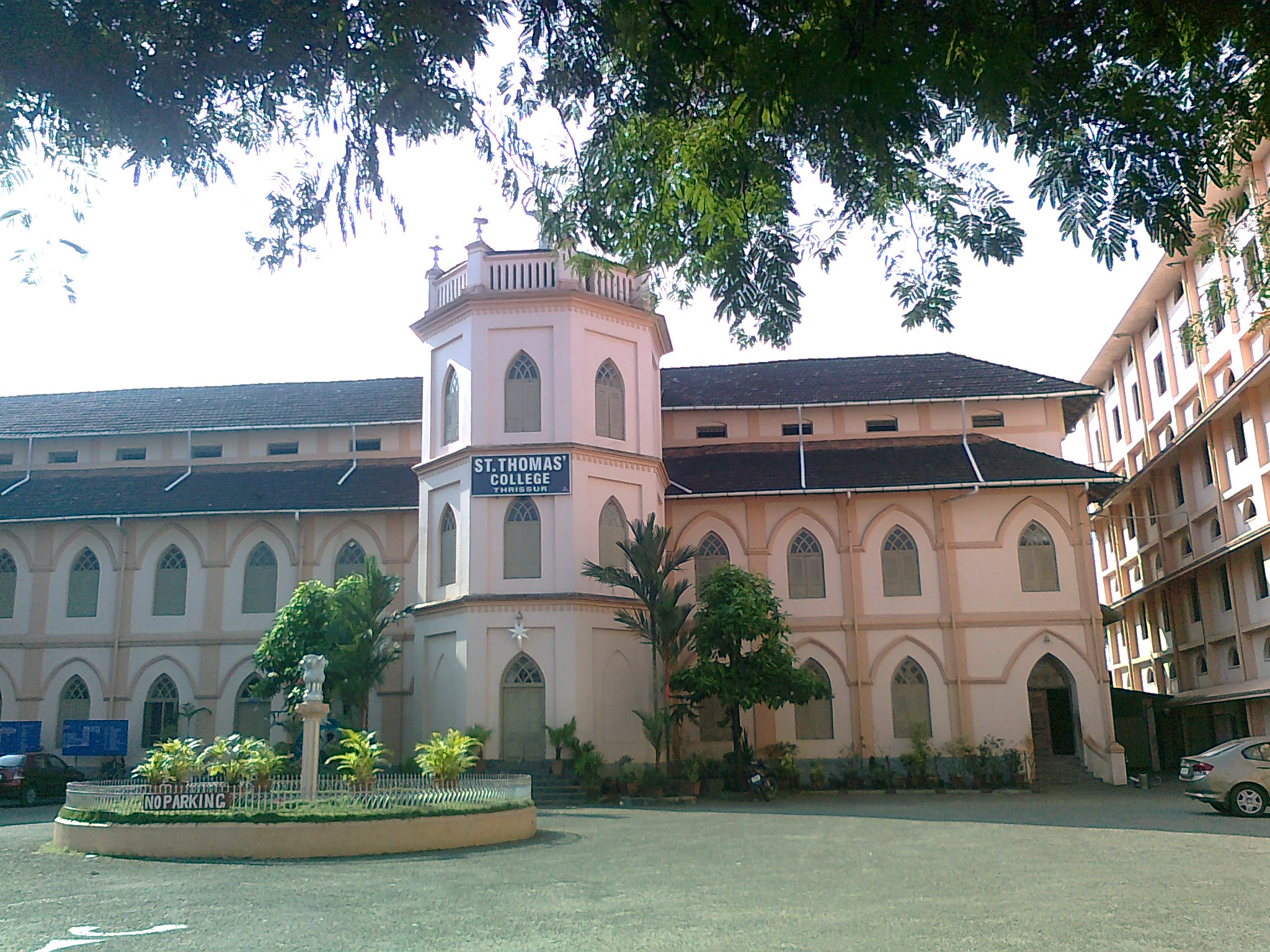
St. Thomas College, Thrissur

Started as a lower secondary school in 1889, the founder, the first Vicar Apostolic of Thrissur, Adolph Medlycott, named it St. Thomas’ College. The college started to function in the compound of present-day Bishop's House compound. In 1918, it was raised to a second-grade college in arts, affiliated to the University of Madras.

The buildings of the college were constructed in a phased manner. Medlycott said that at the time of his return in 1896:

The bishop on taking charge found that there were practically no schools, ... he took early steps to open as many elementary parish schools as possible; within nine years (1888-96) the vicariate was provided with no less than 231 elementary parish schools for both sexes, educating over 12,000 children, besides a high school (St. Thomas's College), with 95 students;.... plans were prepared to house the above college in a handsome structure.

== Notable alumni ==
- Alphons Joseph, Malayalam Film Music Director
- Ashok Menon, Former Judge, Kerala High Court
- Anil Akkara, Former Member Of Kerala Legislative Assembly
- Ancy Sojan, Indian Athlete
- Atlas Ramachandran, Former Banker, Entrepreneur
- Biju Menon, Actor
- Thalappil Pradeep, Indian Scientist
- C. Achutha Menon - Indian Communist Leader and Chief Minister of Kerala state
- C. Janardhanan, Communist Leader, Former Member of Parliament
- Chinmayananda Saraswati - Chinmaya Mission
- C. Raveendranath, Former Minister for General education Government of Kerala
- Devan- Malayalam Film Actor
- E. Santhosh Kumar, Winner of The Kerala Sahithya Academy Award for the best novel in 2012.
- Eknath Easwaran - Internationally respected spiritual teacher
- Eluvathingal Devassy Jemmis - Padma Shri awardee, Professor at Indian Institutes of Science Education and Research
- EMS Namboodiripad - Indian Communist Leader and first Chief Minister of Kerala state
- George Alapatt - Fourth Bishop of Syro-Malabar Catholic Archdiocese of Thrissur
- George Menachery – Historian
- Hariharan - Director
- Johnson- Malayalam Music Director
- Joseph Mundassery - Noted Literary critique and Education Minister of Kerala
- Kochouseph Chittilappilly - MD of V-Guard Industries Ltd
- Mathai Manjooran - Indian Independence Activist
- Mukundan C. Menon, Journalist
- M. O. Joseph, Film Producer
- M. P. Ramachandran, Businessman
- Narain, Actor
- Ouseppachan - Malayalam Film Music Director
- P. T. Kunju Muhammed- Malayalam Film Director and Producer
- Panampilly Govinda Menon - First Prime Minister of Cochin, Last Chief Minister of Travancore-Cochin and Union Cabinet minister for Law and Railways.
- Baselios Marthoma Paulose II - Supreme primate of the Malankara Orthodox Syrian Church
- Joseph Mar Koorilose IX - Metropolitan of Malabar Independent Syrian Church
- Ranjith Sankar, Director
- Sathyan Anthikad, Malayalam Film Director and Writer
- Shine Tom Chacko, Actor
- T. J. Saneesh Kumar Joseph, Member Of Kerala Legislative Assembly
- T. Pradeep - Professor of Chemistry, Chennai
- T. G. Ravi- Malayalam Film Actor
- Tom Emmatty, Malayalam movie director, screenplay writer
- V. M. Sudheeran- Former Member of Parliament
- Victor Manjila- Former Indian Football Player
- Vijayarajamallika- Poet, Activist
- C. P. John- Politician
- Chaman Chacko- Film editor
- Sreeshma Chandran- Film Actress

== Notable faculty ==
- Joseph Mundassery
- A. Sreedhara Menon
- George Menachery
- C. Raveendranath
- K. A. Jayaseelan
- Syam Sudhakar

== See also ==
- Christ College, Irinjalakuda
- St. Joseph's College, Irinjalakuda
- Vimala College
- University of Calicut
