= K. T. Thomas (judge) =

Indian judge

Justice K. T. Thomas
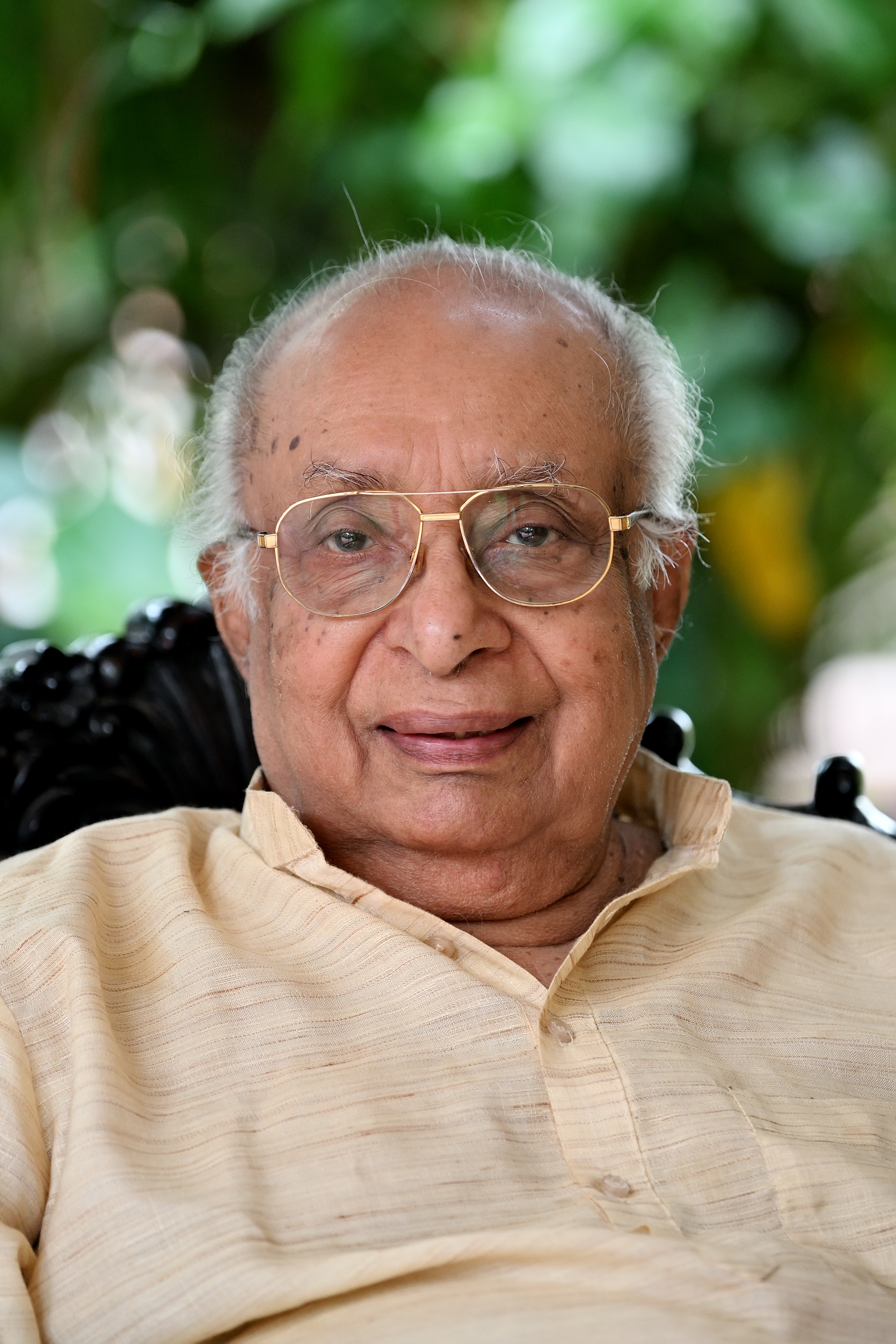
- Justice Thomas in 2023

Judge of the Supreme Court of India
- In office 29 March 1996 – 30 January 2002

Judge of the High Court of Kerala
- In office 12 August 1985 – 26 March 1996

District and Sessions Judge
- In office 12 September 1977 – 11 August 1985

Personal details
- Born: 30 January 1937 (age 89) Kottayam, Kingdom of Travancore, British India (present day Kerala, India)
- Spouse: Susan Tharuni Thomas
- Children: Dr. Binu Prathap Thomas, Justice Bechu Kurian Thomas, Bipin Cherian Thomas
- Education: Bachelor of Arts; Bachelor of Laws
- Alma mater: CMS College Kottayam; St. Albert's College, Kochi; Madras Law College, Chennai
- Awards: Padma Vibhushan (2026) Padma Bhushan (2007)
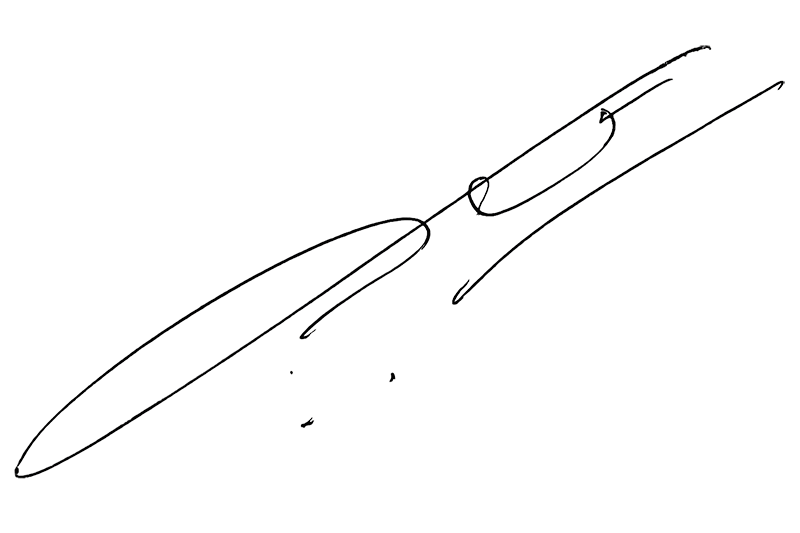
- Signature

Kallupurackal Thomas Thomas (born 30 January 1937) is an Indian former judge who served on the Supreme Court of India. He presided over and confirmed the death sentences in the Rajiv Gandhi assassination case. He was awarded the Padma Bhushan in 2007, post-retirement. He has taken strong public positions since 2011 such as exonerating RSS in Mahatma Gandhi's assassination and opposition to capital punishment. He received the highest Padma Vibhushan in 2026 by the Government of India for services in the field of social affairs.

== Biography ==
K. T. Thomas was born in Kottayam district on 30 January 1937. After schooling at Baker Memorial School, he completed his Pre-University course from CMS College Kottayam and B.A. at St. Albert's College, Kochi, where he served as the College Union Chairman. He studied law at Madras Law College (now Dr. Ambedkar Government Law College, Chennai).

He enrolled as an advocate in 1960 and started his career in Kottayam as a junior advocate to Joseph Maliakal, a leading lawyer of those days. Soon, he set up his private practice at District Court, Kottayam and later, at the High Court of Kerala. In 1977, he was directly selected as District and Sessions Judge, securing first rank in the selection tests. He was promoted as a Judge of the High Court of Kerala in 1985 and served as the Acting Chief Justice in 1995. In 1996, he was appointed as a Judge of the Supreme Court of India. During his practice as an advocate, he led an Indian delegation to the World Conference on Peace held at Texas, United States in 1976. He also served as chairman of one of the Commissions set up at the World Conference.

Thomas retired from service in 2002 and lives at Muttambalam in Kottayam district. His autobiography, Honeybees of Solomon, published in 2008, is an account of his judicial service of 25 years, which has since been published in Malayalam as Solomontae Theneechakal. His son, Justice Bechu Kurian Thomas, who was one of the youngest to be a designated Senior Advocate of the Kerala High Court was sworn in as an Additional Judge of the Kerala High Court in March 2020.

== Notable judgement ==
Justice Thomas presided over the Supreme Court bench that confirmed the death sentence in the Rajiv Gandhi assassination case.

== Political positions ==
His recommendations on the fee structure for professional education in Kerala at unaided institutions also drew opposition from the institution owners.

In August 2011, he made a public speech where he exonerated RSS from the assassination of Mahatma Gandhi which generated heated public debate.

His opposition to the Communal and Targeted Violence bill also created a stir. He termed the Bill divisive and against the constitution of India.

Though Justice Thomas wrote a dissenting note on the report of the Empowered Committee regarding the maintenance of the water level at Mullaperiyar Dam, his concurrence with the report stating that the dam was safe raised criticism in his home state of Kerala.

In the Rajiv Gandhi assassination case, he opined in 2013 that the three accused sentenced to death should be spared from capital punishment due to the delay of 23 years in carrying out the punishment.

In March 2014, Thomas declined the offer of the Government of India to head the selection committee of Lokpal stating the "recommendations of the search committee are not binding on the selection committee. Therefore, the work of the search committee can as well be done by the selection committee itself." Another matter of public interest was his letter to the Chief Justice of India on allegations raised by Senior Advocate Dushyant Dave regarding the disposal of a 12-year-old land allotment case by a two-judge bench headed by Justice C. K. Prasad, which was actually listed before another three Judge Bench.

== Awards ==
- Padma Bhushan awarded by the Government of India, 2007.
- Padma Vibhushan awarded by the Government of India, 2026

== Positions held ==
- District and Sessions Judge, Kottayam district – 1977
- Additional District and Sessions Judge, Kozhikode district – 1979
- Principal District and Sessions Judge, Kozhikode district – 1981
- Principal District and Sessions Judge, Kollam district – 1982
- Principal District and Sessions Judge, Thiruvananthapuram district – 1984
- Additional Justice, High Court of Kerala – 1985
- Permanent Justice, High Court of Kerala – 1986
- Acting Chief Justice, High Court of Kerala – 1995
- Justice, Supreme Court of India – 1996
- Chairman – Justice K. T. Thomas Committee on Unaided professional colleges – 2003
- Chairman of the Police Reforms Monitoring Committee constituted by the Supreme Court
- Chairman of the School Review Commission to review the functioning of National Law School of India University, Bengaluru

== Bibliography ==
- Honeybees Of Solomon - Memoirs Of A Jurist - Autobiography (English & Malayalam) - 2008
- Nyayapeetathilethummunpu - Malayalam - 2015
- Mullapperiyar Dam: Chila Velippeduthalukal - Malayalam - 2016
- Vaidyan Chikilsikkunnu Daivam Saukhyamakkunnu - Malayalam - 2018
- Kottayathinte Kadha - Malayalam - 2021
- Kuttakruthyangalude Daivasasthram - Malayalam - 2022
- Momentous Challenges in Two Decades
