= Syam Kumar V. M. =

The Honourable Justice Syam Kumar V. M.

Judge, Kerala High Court
- Incumbent
- Assumed office 22 March 2024
- Nominated by: D. Y. Chandrachud
- Appointed by: Droupadi Murmu

Personal details
- Born: 1 June 1973 (age 53) India
- Spouse: Sandhya. M.
- Parent: Adv. T. Gopakumar (father)
- Education: LL.M. in Maritime Law
- Alma mater: Government Law College, Ernakulam; CUSAT
- Website: High Court of Kerala

Syam Kumar Vadakke Mudavakkat (Malayalam: ശ്യാം കുമാർ വടക്കേ മുടവക്കാട്ട്) is an Indian judge who is presently serving as a judge of Kerala High Court. The High Court of Kerala is the highest court in the Indian state of Kerala and in the Union Territory of Lakshadweep. The High Court of Kerala is headquartered at Ernakulam, Kochi. Justice Syam Kumar was elevated as judge from the bar while he was practicing as a lawyer in Kerala High Court.

== Career ==
Syam Kumar secured graduation in Law from Government Law College, Ernakulam and enrolled as an advocate in 1996 at Bar Council of Kerala. Started practicing with his father T. Gopakumar. During his practice he secured LL.M. in Maritime Law from School of Legal Studies, Cochin University of Science and Technology (CUSAT). After completing his masters degree Maritime Law he continued his practice with S. Venkiteswaran, Senior Advocate, Bombay High Court. Thereafter shifted his practice to Ernakulam in 2000 with law firm Southern Law Chambers where he became the partner in 2005. Started independent practice in 2014. Concentrated practice was in Admiralty and Shipping law, Commercial law and Constitutional Law. Served as Associate Professor at the National University of Advanced Legal Studies, as guest faculty in various law schools including the School of Legal Studies, Cochin University of Science and Technology and Kerala University of Fisheries and Ocean Studies. He served as amicus curia in the 2023 Tanur boat disaster and appeared for the relatives of the deceased fishermen in Enrica Lexie case. Upon appointed sworn in as the additional judge of the High Court of Kerala on 22.03.2024 and became Permanent Judge from 04.03.2026 A.N.

== Notable rulings ==
=== Media trial in criminal case ===
In 2023, a larger bench headed by Justice Jayasankaran Nambiar with Justices Kauser Edappagath, Justice Mohammed Nias C. P, C. S. Sudha and Justice Syam Kumar ruled as media commentary declaring an accused guilty or innocent while a criminal case is pending is not protected speech under Article 19(1)(a) of the Constitution of India, as it must be balanced against the individual’s right to dignity, reputation and a fair trial under Article 21 and specifically observed as “media freedom does not grant a license to interfere with the justice delivery system.” and the risk of “trial by media” skewing public perception of the outcome of pending cases.

=== 2024 Wayanad landslides ===
Following the series of landslides occurred in Punjirimattom, Mundakkai, Chooralmala, and Vellarimala villages in Wayanad on 30 July 2024, which reported of 254 fatalities, 397 injuries and 118 people missing, a Division Bench of Justice Jayasankaran Nambiar and Justice Syam Kumar registered a suo motu case and issued a series of directions to the Union and State Government including on disbursing compensation through bank accounts, ensuring that the Model Code of Conduct for elections did not impede relief work, and pressing the Centre and the National Disaster Management Authority (India) to consider waiving the loan dues of landslide victims..
