= Gopinath P. =

Indian judge of Kerala High Court

The Honourable Justice Gopinath P.
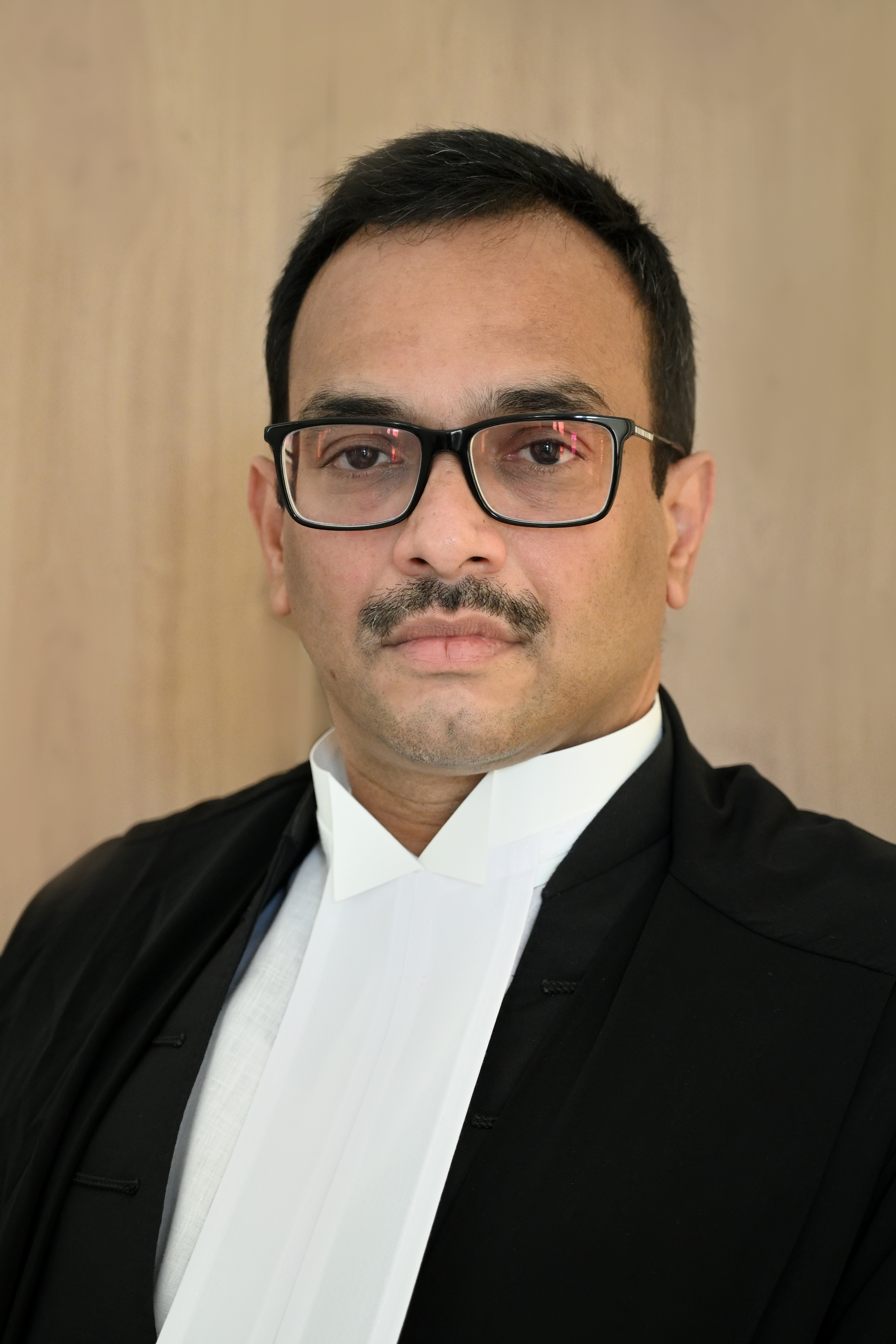

Judge of Kerala High Court
- Incumbent
- Assumed office 6 March 2020
- Nominated by: Sharad Arvind Bobde
- Appointed by: Ram Nath Kovind

Personal details
- Born: 13 November 1972 (age 53)
- Citizenship: Indian
- Education: University of Cambridge
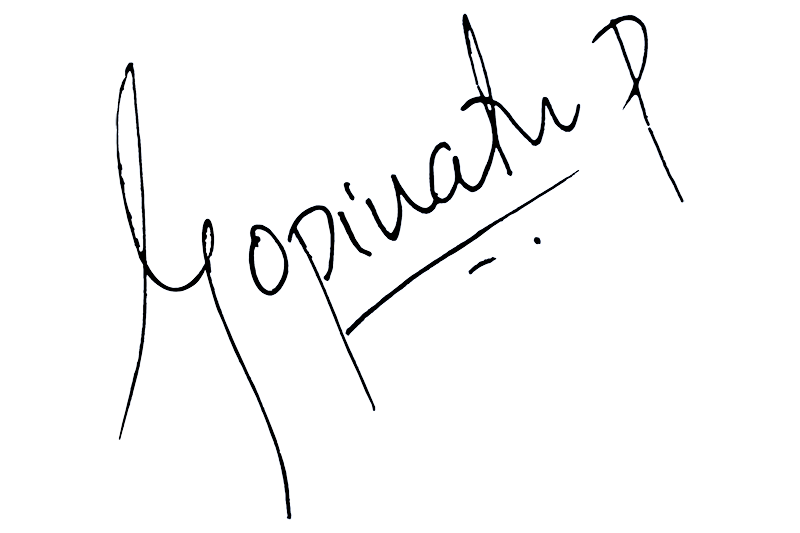
- Signature

Gopinath Puzhankara is an Indian judge presently serving as a judge of Kerala High Court, the highest court in the Indian state of Kerala and in the Union Territory of Lakshadweep. The High Court of Kerala is headquartered at Ernakulam, Kochi. The court of justice Gopinath was one among the three paperless courts that started functioning from 1 August 2022 in Kerala High Court.

== Education ==
Gopinath obtained law degree from the Government Law College, Ernakulam securing 1st rank in the final examination and completed masters in Law from University of Cambridge, United Kingdom with Cambridge Commonwealth Trust Scholarship for undertaking post graduate study at the University of Cambridge.

== Career ==
Gopinath enrolled in 1996 and started practicing as a lawyer. During his practice he served as Central Government Counsel and Senior Standing Counsel for the Central Board of Excise and Customs. In 2018 he was designated as Senior Advocate by Kerala High Court. 6 March 2020 he was appointed as additional judge of Kerala High Court and became permanent with effect from 28.05.2021.

== Notable rulings ==
=== Animal rights ===
==== Pets in apartments ====
In 2021, a bench consisting of Justice A. K. Jayasankaran Nambiar and Justice Gopinath ruled that bylaws banning pets in apartments and resident associations was illegal and unconstitutional and pointed out the guidelines issued by the Animal Welfare Board of India in February 2015 with respect to pet-owning residents could be adopted by the residents associations while prescribing conditions for keeping of pets in the apartments.

==== Tranlocation of Arikomban ====
In March 2023 the Bench of Justice A. K. Jayasankaran Nambiar and Justice Gopinath prevented the Kerala Forest Department from capturing and taming Kumki elephants at the Kodanad Elephant Center in Ernakulam district. The Bench appointed an expert committee to investigate the matter, which recommended moving the elephant to the Parambikulam Tiger Reserve, a wilderness region with no possibility of human–elephant conflict. The Kerala government was then instructed by the Bench to release Arikomban in a location chosen by the government while concealing the location. The Bench then instructed the forest department to follow the elephant, tranquillize it, and then fasten a radio collar around its neck to monitor its activities.

=== Plastic ban ===
In June 2025, a Division Bench of Justices Gopinath and Justice Bechu Kurian Thomas, in a suo motu case initiated by the bench, banned the use of single use plastic products in tourist hill-stations and public and private gatherings in Kerala and the Government authorities were required to provide alternative drinking-water facilities and enforcement mechanisms in tourist hill-stations and public places with effect from 2 October, 2025. The bench specifically directed the authorities to incorporate the prohibition of the prescribed plastic items as license conditions in hotels and auditoriums. The bench directed the State and local self-government authorities to prevent dumping of plastic waste into rivers, backwaters, canals etc. and to regularly collect remove the plastic waste from the water bodies within the local limits and a request for support by the voluntary organisations for the same was also placed by the bench.

=== Employment ban of women ===
In October 2026, bench of Justice Gopinath declared the provision of Kerala Abkari Shops Disposal Rules, 2002 prohibiting a women to be employed in a toddy shop, as unconstitutional as it violates Articles 14, 15, 19 and 21 of the Constitution of India and pointed out the responsibility of the Government to ensure safe workplace for women and eliminate the gender based inequalities, thereby empowering women to confidently pursue their chosen career.
