= V. G. Arun =

Indian judge

Hon'ble Justice (Retd.) V. G. Arun

Judge of Kerala High Court
- In office 05 November 2018 – 24 January 2026

Personal details
- Born: 25 January 1964 (age 62) Kerala
- Citizenship: Indian
- Education: Kerala Law Academy
- Website: High Court of Kerala

V. G. Arun is an Indian jurist and a former judge of the Kerala High Court. The High Court of Kerala is the highest court in the Indian state of Kerala and in the Union Territory of Lakshadweep. The court is headquartered at Ernakulam, Kochi.

== Early life and education ==
Arun was born on 25.01.1964. After completing his graduation in Economics from Baselius College, Kottayam, he obtained a law degree from Kerala Law Academy, Thiruvananthapuram.

== Career ==
Arun was enrolled as Advocate on 08.01.1989 and started his practice in various courts at Calicut and later shifted his practice to High Court of Kerala, Ernakulam in December, 1990 with Senior Advocate TR Raman Pillai. In 2005 he was appointed as the Editor of Indian Law Reports Kerala Series and he served with post till 04.11.2018. On 05.11.2018 he was elevated as Additional Judge of High Court of Kerala.
