= T. R. Ravi =

Indian judge (born 1965)

Justice T. R. Ravi

Judge of Kerala High Court
- Incumbent
- Assumed office 06 March 2020
- Appointed by: Ram Nath Kovind

Personal details
- Born: 2 March 1965 (age 61)
- Citizenship: Indian
- Education: Government Law College, Kozhikode
- Website: High Court of Kerala

Thirumuppath Raghavan Ravi (born 2 March 1965) is a judge of Kerala High Court. The High Court of Kerala is the highest court in the Indian state of Kerala and in the Union Territory of Lakshadweep. The High Court of Kerala is headquartered at Ernakulam, Kochi.

== Education ==
Ravi completed his schooling from schools in Thiruchirappally and Coimbatore, graduation from PSG College of Arts and Science and obtained a law degree from Government Law College, Kozhikode.

== Career ==
Ravi enrolled as an Advocate on 8 January 1989 and started practice at Tirur, Malappuram later shifted his practice to Kerala High Court within few months after his enrollment. He served as honorary reporter of Indian Law Reports (Kerala Series) from 1993 to 1999, as Senior Government pleader from 2004 to 2006, as Special Government pleader (Forests) for a period of three months and was a member of the Statutory Rules Committee of the Kerala High Court till his elevation as Judge. On 6 March 2020 he was appointed as additional judge of Kerala High Court.
