= A. Sajeevan =

Malayalam language journalist and author

Suprabhaatham Daily Office, Francis Road, Calicut, Kerala

Personal details
- Citizenship: Indian
- Spouse: K. Krishna Kumari
- Education: Degree in Law, Master Degree in Malayalam
- Alma mater: Calicut University
- Occupation: Executive Editor, Suprabhaatham Daily
- Profession: Journalist

A. Sajeevan is a veteran journalist, author and channel debater in Malayalam language. He hails from Beypore, Kozhikkode dist. of Kerala state. He has worked with noted daily news papers which publish from Kerala. He has been known for his liberal and secular political views.

== Early life ==
He born on 15 February 1961 at Naduvattam of Beypore, an ancient seaport town in Kozhikkode dist., of Kerala state. His parents are Alancheri Shankaran (father) and Kausalya (mother). He completed his schooling at Govt. High School, Beypore. He has then studied at Govt. arts & science college, Calicut from where he obtained master's degree in Malayalam language. Later he did graduation in LLB from Government Law College, Kozhikode. He married K. Krishna Kumari. They have two children who are Hrithik S.K. and Hrishikesh S. Krishana.

== Career ==
As a journalist, he has worked with some of the well known journals including Kerala Kaumudi, Kalakaumudi and Mamagalam Malayalam dailies. Currently he is the executive editor of Suprabhaatham daily which publishes from Kozhikkode. He has been working at Suprabhaatham since its inception.

== Bibliography ==
- Thikkodiyante Kalam- 2009
- Ezhuthinte Akasam, M. T. Yude Jeevitham- 2010
- Em Tiyude Jeevitham
- Em Ti Novel Padanangal
- Guro Porukkuka - Sree Narayana Guru- 2015
- Oru Amusliminte Priyapetta Islam-2016
- Chiri Vaidyam- 2017

== Awards ==
=== For the contribution in Literature ===
- S.K. Pottekkad Award (Thikkodiyante kaalam)
- Panthirukulam Award (Guro Porukkuka)
- Shankarankutty Memorial Award (Guro Porukkuka)

=== For the Contribution in Journalism ===
- C.H. Muhammad Koya Award
- Kerala State Govt. Journalism Award
- Mohammed Abdur Rahiman Award
- Thoppil Ravi Award
- Suraksha Award
- Odeesi Award
- Madhyama Ratna Award
- J.K. Foundation Award
