= Bechu Kurian Thomas =

Indian judge of Kerala High Court

The Honourable Justice Bechu Kurian Thomas
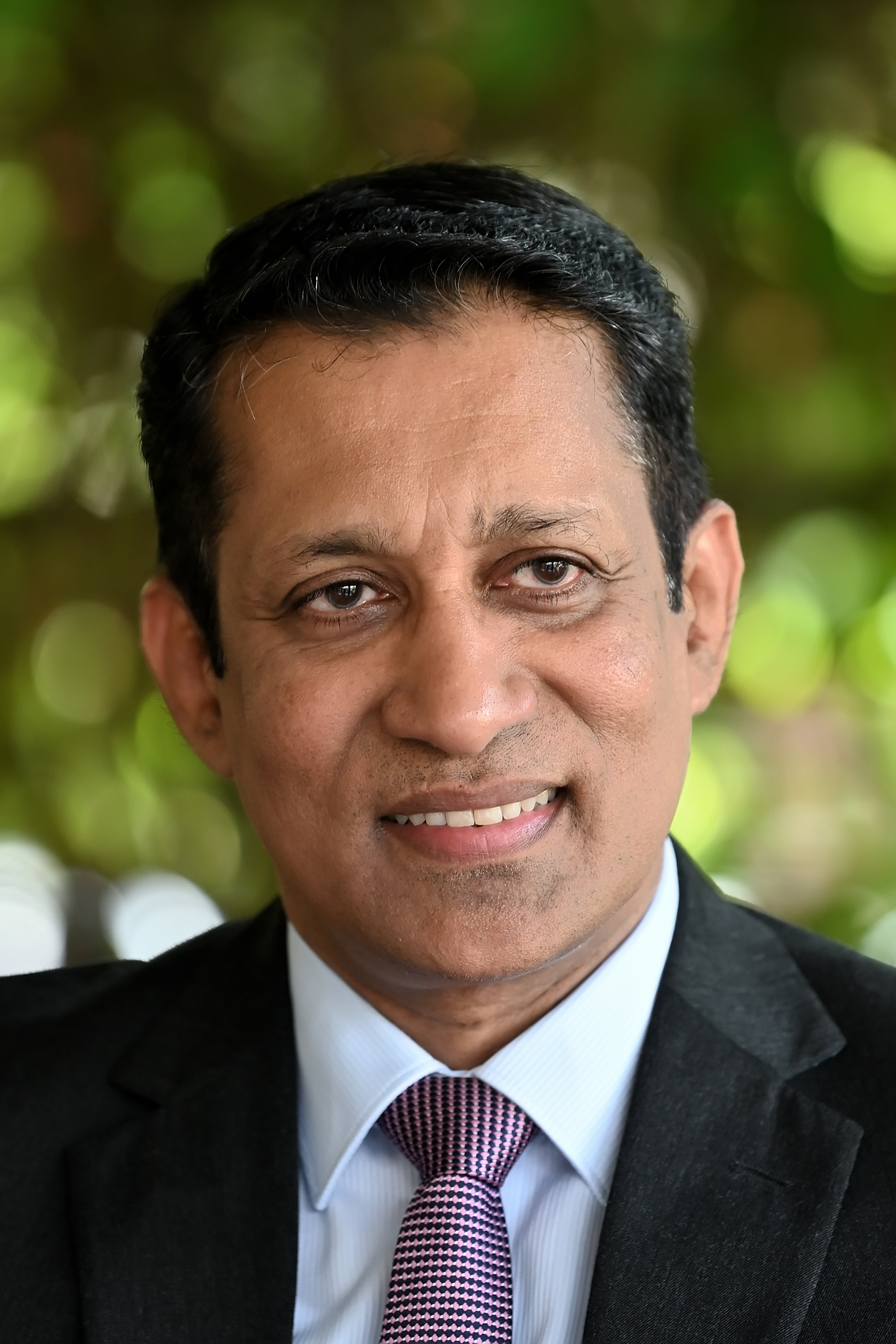

Judge of the High Court of Kerala
- Incumbent
- Assumed office 6 March 2020
- Nominated by: Sharad Arvind Bobde
- Appointed by: Ram Nath Kovind

Personal details
- Born: 5 December 1968 (age 57) Kottayam, Kerala, India
- Spouse: Meenu
- Children: Adv. Suzanne Kurian; Tarun Thomas Kurian
- Parents: Justice K. T. Thomas (father); Susan Tharuni Thomas (mother)
- Education: Government Law College, Ernakulam

Bechu Kurian Thomas is an Indian judge presently serving on the Kerala High Court.

== Early life and education ==
Bechu Kurian was born at Kottayam as the second son of Justice K. T. Thomas and Susan Tharuni Thomas. He has completed his schooling from Corpus Christi School, Kottayam, St. Joseph's Boys' Higher Secondary School, Kozhikode and St. Aloysius Higher Secondary School, Quilon, pre degree from Government Arts College, Thiruvananthapuram and obtained law degree from Government Law College, Ernakulam securing 1st rank in the University in 1992 and was awarded with Annamma Kunjacko Memorial Gold Medal.

== Career ==
Bechu Kurian enrolled in 1992 and started practicing as a lawyer at Kottayam. He shifted to Ernakulam in 1995 and started practicing in various courts including the Supreme Court of India, the High Court of Kerala, National Company Law Appellate Tribunal, National Green Tribunal etc. He specialised in the fields of Constitutional law, Administrative law, Taxation laws, Corporate law, Arbitration, Environmental laws, Civil Law, Criminal law, and Maritime law.

In 1997, he received British Council Chevening Scholarship and underwent study and training in English Commercial Law and Practice at the College of Law, York and at Hammonds Suddards, London. He started his office Bechu Kurian & Co at Ernakulam in 1998. He served as law reporter of Kerala Law Journal from 1997 to 2002. He served as standing counsel for the University of Kerala from 2014 to 2015. In 2015, he was designated as Senior Advocate by Kerala High Court. On 6 March 2020, he was appointed as an additional judge of Kerala High Court and became permanent judge with effect from 28 May 2021.

== Notable rulings ==
=== Child sexual abuse laws in India ===
In August 2022, bench of Justice Bechu Kurian, while hearing a bail plea in a sexual offence under Protection of Children from Sexual Offenses Act, 2012, expressing the concern and quoting Erin's Law, the first law passed in the United States requiring sexual abuse prevention education to be taught to students in school every year, issued guidelines and directions to the Government of Kerala and Central Board of Secondary Education to introduce a Prevention-Oriented Program on Sexual Abuse in the curriculum from the next academic year.

=== Plastic ban ===
In June 2025, a Division Bench of Justices Bechu Kurian and Justice P. Gopinath, in a suo motu case initiated by the bench, banned the use of single use plastic products in tourist hill-stations and public and private gatherings in Kerala and the Government authorities were required to provide alternative drinking-water facilities and enforcement mechanisms in tourist hill-stations and public places with effect from 2 October, 2025. The bench specifically directed the authorities to incorporate the prohibition of the prescribed plastic items as license conditions in hotels and auditoriums. The bench directed the State and local self-government authorities to prevent dumping of plastic waste into rivers, backwaters, canals etc. and to regularly collect remove the plastic waste from the water bodies within the local limits and a request for support by the voluntary organisations for the same was also placed by the bench.

== Achievements ==
=== Ironman 70.3 ===
In 2026, Justice Bechu Kurian has participated in Ironman 70.3, also known as a Half Ironman, the Triathlon organised by World Triathlon Corporation at Goa and finished the race involves a 1.9 km swim, a 90 km cycling ride, and a 21.1 km run, in 8 hours, 46 minutes and 44 seconds in the Males 55-59 category and be the first Ironman 70.3 in the Indian Judiciary.
