= Government Law College, Kozhikode =

Law college in Kerala

Government Law College Kozhikode
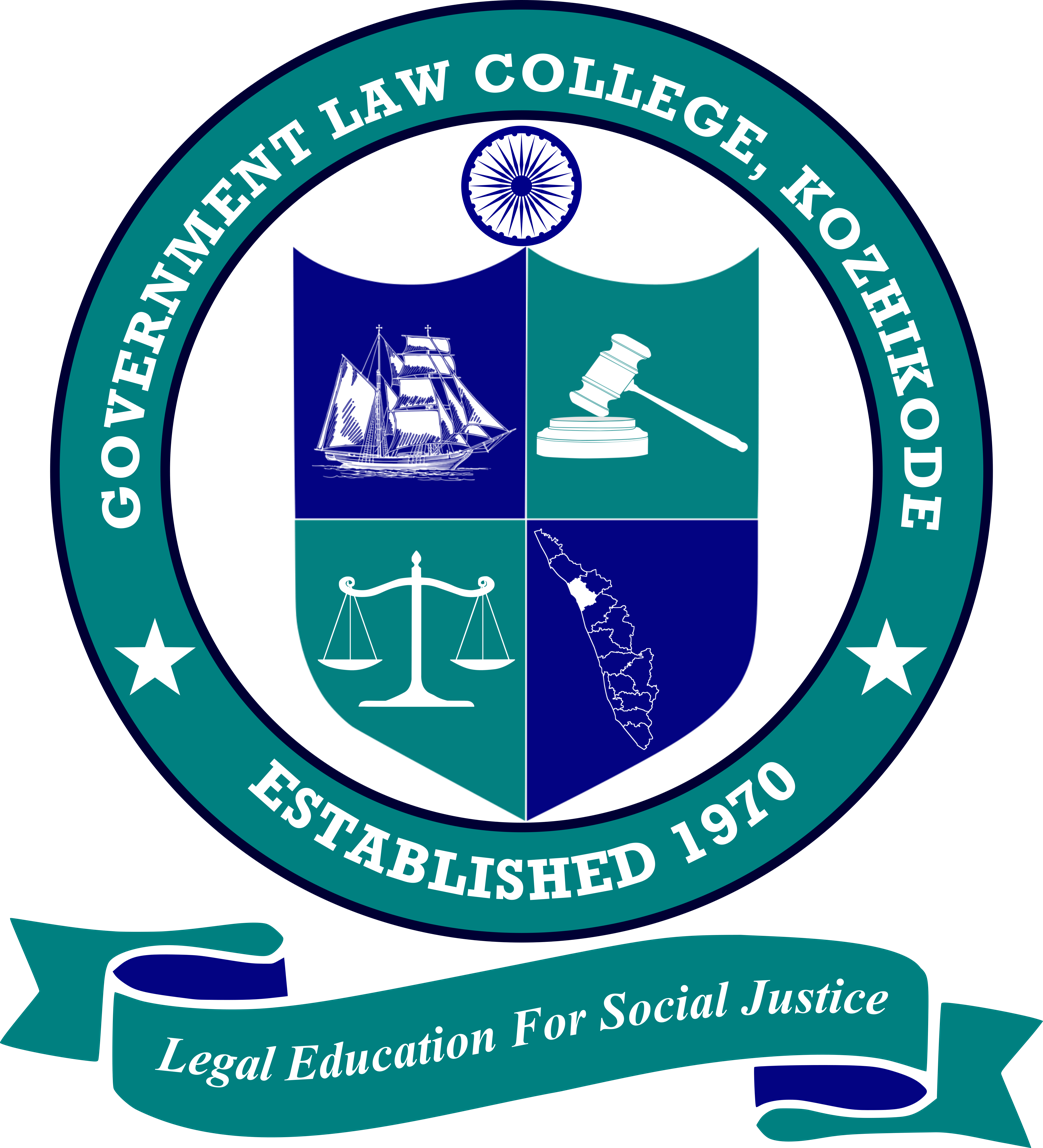
- Motto: Legal Education For Social Justice
- Type: Government College
- Established: 1970; 56 years ago
- Affiliations: Bar Council of India & University of Calicut
- Students: 1000
- Undergraduates: 880
- Postgraduates: 30
- Location: Kozhikode, Kerala, Marikkunnu P.O, Kozhikode, 673012, India; 11.2928°N 75.8192°E
- Campus: Urban
- Language: English
- Website: glckozhikode.ac.in

The Government Law College, Kozhikode or Kozhikode Law College situated on the outskirts of Kozhikode, India, is owned by the Government of Kerala and affiliated to the University of Calicut. The college caters to the needs of the Malabar region of Kerala. Students are selected through a state level entrance test. The college offers LL.B and LL.M courses.

== History ==
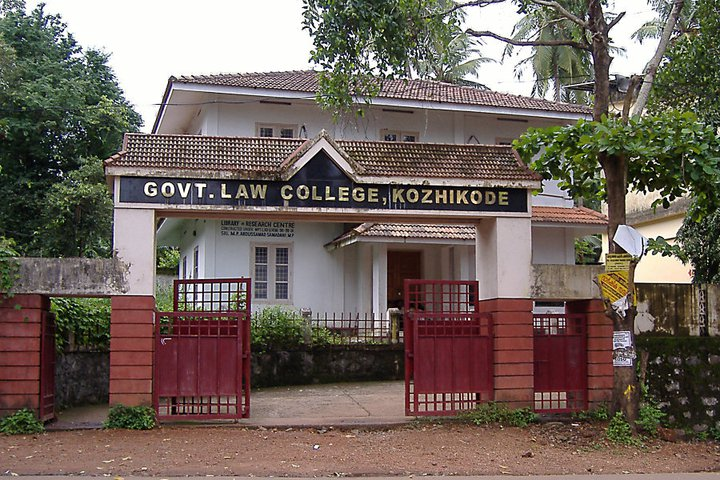
Govt law college calicut

The city has a court complex that is more than two centuries old. In 1970, the Government of Kerala started the third law college in the state in the city of Kozhikode in 1970. It was the first law college for the northern part of Kerala State. The college was started in the Government Training college buildings in the heart of the city.

The first principal was Prof M. Krishnan Nair and the first lecturer was Prof. Ramakrishnan. The first course started was LL.B and the first batch came out in 1973. In 1976, an LL.M Course was started with Law of Taxation as special subject.

== Campus ==
In 1982, the college shifted to its own campus. The new campus has an academic block, research block and separate hostels for boys and girls. In the near future the college will have annexure for the academic block and library.

The college campus has the following blocks.

- Academic Block houses the LL.B & LL.M classrooms.
- Administrative block houses the moot court hall, principal's office, audiovisual room, computer lab, staff rooms, college office and auditorium.
- The Library Block – The college has a library with fifteen thousand law books, and more than 30 types of legal and non legal periodicals. There are separate sections for UGC extension library and a book bank for the backward community and SC&ST students. The library is completely automated.
- The Research Center is equipped with networked computers housed in a separate building, financed by the MP fund. The center researches activities related to cyber laws and laws relating to computer application and electronic media. The Centre will hold advance and applied level research in the specified areas. The Publication of a Cyber Law Journal also is in the agenda of the center.
- The Hostels – There are two separate hostels for the boys and girls, each accommodating 100 students.
- Play ground
- Badminton Court
- Canteen

== Academics ==
=== Academic programmes ===
In 1984, the five year LL.B course was started. At present, the college is holding LL.B five year and three year courses and the LL.M course. All the courses are held by the Government of Kerala and are affiliated to the University of Calicut.

The College offers 5 year integrated BBA, LLB (Honours), 3 year LLB and LLM courses. The course of study and syllabi is in accordance with that laid down by the University of Calicut. The 3-year LLB course is divided into 6 semesters and the 5-year course is divided into 10 semesters which is an integrated dual degree course of B.B.A.LL.B.

The college provides instructions to candidates preparing for the LL. M. Degree Examination of the University of Calicut in Taxation Law and Criminal Law. The course of study and syllabi are in accordance with those laid down by the university.

== Notable alumni ==
=== Judiciary ===
- C. T. Ravikumar, Judge - Supreme Court of India
- Surendran Pattel, Judge for the 240th Texas District Court in Fort Bend County, United States.
- Kauser Edappagath, Honorable judge - Kerala High Court
- T. R. Ravi, Honorable judge - Kerala High Court
- Ashok Menon, Honorable Judge - Kerala High Court
- Mohammed Nias C. P, Judge - Kerala High Court
- Justice R Basant, Former Judge - Kerala High Court.
- A Hariprasad, Former Judge - Kerala High Court

=== Government ===
- Mullappally Ramachandran, Former Minister of State for Home Affairs, Former President, Kerala Pradesh Congress Committee.
- A.K. Balan, Former Minister for Law, Cultural Affairs, Parliamentary Affairs Government of Kerala
- P. A. Mohammed Riyas, Minister of PWD & Tourism, Government of Kerala
- C. P. John, Minister of Transport, Government of Kerala
- N. Samsudheen, Minister for General Education, Government of Kerala
- P. S. Sreedharan Pillai, Governor of State of Mizoram

=== Legislature ===
- M. P. Abdussamad Samadani, Member of Parliament
- P. T. Thomas, Member of Kerala Legislative Assembly
- P. T. A. Rahim, Member of Kerala Legislative Assembly
- N. Samsudheen, Member of Kerala Legislative Assembly
- K. M. Sachin Dev, Member of Kerala Legislative Assembly
- K. Shanthakumari, Member of Kerala Legislative Assembly
- T Siddique, Member of Kerala Legislative Assembly
- Sajeev Joseph, Member of Kerala Legislative Assembly
- P. Sathidevi, Former Member of Parliament
- P. Sankaran, Former Member of Parliament & former Member of Kerala Legislative Assembly
- T K Noushad, Former Member of Kerala Legislative Assembly
- T.O Mohanan, Member of Kerala Legislative Assembly
- Sunny Joseph (politician), Member of Kerala Legislative Assembly
- Vidya Balakrishnan, Member of Kerala Legislative Assembly
- Fathima Thahiliya, founding general secretary of Haritha, Member of the Kerala Legislative Assembly
- P. K. Firos, Member of the Kerala Legislative Assembly
- V. S Joy, Member of the Kerala Legislative Assembly
- M. Rahmathulla, Member of the Kerala Legislative Assembly

=== Politicians ===
- A. Vijayaraghavan, Former General Secretary in Charge, Communist Party of India (Marxist) Kerala State Committee, Former Member of Parliament
- S. K. Sajeesh, Politician, Former Treasurer, Kerala State Committee of the Democratic Youth Federation of India (DYFI)
- Najma Thabsheera Politician, National Secretary of Muslim Youth League (MYL), President - Perinthalmanna Block Panchayath

=== Others ===
- A. Sajeevan, Journalist

== See also ==
- Government Law College, Thrissur
- Government Law College, Ernakulam
- Government Law College, Thiruvananthapuram
