= Surendran Pattel =

Indian-American lawyer and judge

Judge for the 240th Texas District Court in Fort Bend County
- Incumbent
- Assumed office January 1, 2023
- Preceded by: Frank Fraley

Personal details
- Born: 29 May 1971 (age 55)
- Education: Government Law College, Kozhikode, University of Calicut, University of Houston

Surendran Pattel (born May 29, 1971) is an Indian-born American lawyer who is a judge for the 240th Texas District Court in Fort Bend County.

== Personal life ==
He was born in Kasargod, Kerala on May 29, 1971 as the fourth child of his parents who were labourers. He was grown up in poverty. In his early age, he rolled cigarettes. He was dropout from his school. His parents were poor and they were depended on meager wages. He is founder of a law firm.

== Career ==
He got law degree from University of Calicut. He began his career by starting practicing in Hosdurg taluk in 1996 and Delhi in 2005. He has also fought cases in Supreme Court of India. In 2007, when his wife was selected to work in medical center in United States, they moved to Houston.
