= Ashok Menon =

Hon'ble Justice Ashok Menon

Judge Kerala High Court
- In office 30 November 2017 – 13 August 2021
- Appointed by: Ram Nath Kovind

Personal details
- Born: 15 August 1959 (age 67)
- Citizenship: Indian
- Education: Government Law College, Kozhikode
- Website: High Court of Kerala

Ashok Menon (born 15 August 1959) was a judge of Kerala High Court, the highest court in the Indian state of Kerala and in the Union Territory of Lakshadweep. The High Court is headquartered at Ernakulam, Kochi.

== Early life ==
Ashok Menon completed his schooling from Kendriya Vidyalaya, graduated from St. Thomas College, Thrissur and obtained a law degree from Government Law College, Kozhikode.

== Career ==
Menon started practicing as a lawyer in Thrissur and Wadakkancherry Courts in 1981. He started serving as Munsiff-Magistrate in 1988. Thereafter promoted as Sub Judge in 1995 and as District Judge in 2002. He was appointed as Registrar, Supreme Court of India in 2009 and continued to be as Registrar, Competition Appellate Tribunal, New Delhi from 2010 to 2013. Thereafter served as Principal District Judge, Kollam from 2013 to 2015. He was appointed as Registrar General, High Court of Kerala in 2015. On 30 November 2017 he was elevated as an additional judge of Kerala High Court and became permanent judge of that High Court on 29 August 2019.
