= Anil K. Narendran =

Indian judge

The Honourable Justice Anil K. Narendran

Judge, Kerala High Court
- Incumbent
- Assumed office 23 January 2014
- Nominated by: P. Sathasivam
- Appointed by: Pranab Mukherjee

Personal details
- Born: 5 May 1967 (age 59)
- Citizenship: Indian
- Education: Kerala Law Academy
- Website: High Court of Kerala

Anil Kalavampara Narendran (born 5 May 1967) is a judge of Kerala High Court in India.

== Education and career ==
Anil graduated in chemistry from Sacred Heart College, Thevara, obtained a law degree from Kerala Law Academy and started practice in 1993. He was appointed as additional judge of the High Court of Kerala on 23.01.2014 and became permanent from 10 March 2016. He was one among the sitting judges who were appointed as adjunct professors at National University of Advanced Legal Studies.
