= Preeta A. K. =

Indian judge

The Honourable Justice Preeta A. K.

Additional Judge of the Kerala High Court
- Incumbent
- Assumed office 27 April 2026
- Appointed by: Droupadi Murmu

Personal details
- Born: Peermade, Idukki district
- Education: Kerala Law Academy
- Website: https://hckerala.gov.in/judges.php

Preeta A. K. is an Indian judge serving as an additional judge of the Kerala High Court. She was appointed to the court in April 2026 and assumed office on 27 April 2026.

== Early life and education ==
Preetha is a native of Peermade in Idukki district, Kerala. She completed her schooling at St. Pius School, Kuttikanam, and obtained her law degree from Kerala Law Academy in Thiruvananthapuram.

== Career ==
Preetha enrolled as an advocate with the Kerala Bar Council on 26 October 1997. She practised before the Kerala High Court, labour courts and industrial tribunals. Her areas of practice included labour and employment law, constitutional law and service law. She served as standing counsel for organisations including the Customs and Central Excise Department, the Employees' State Insurance Corporation, GAIL, Kochi Metro Rail Limited and Kochi Water Metro Limited.

The President of India notified her appointment as an additional judge of the Kerala High Court on 24 April 2026. She was sworn in on 27 April 2026 for a two-year term.

== Judicial work ==
=== Wayanad disaster proceedings ===
Preetha was part of a Division Bench with Justice A. K. Jayasankaran Nambiar that heard proceedings concerning disaster management in Kerala, including matters arising from the 2024 Wayanad landslides.

In July 2026, the bench issued directions concerning compensation and medical expenses for people affected by a landslide at the site of the Kalladi tunnel project in Wayanad. The court directed the state government to ensure the disbursal of ex gratia compensation and to meet the hospitalisation and treatment expenses of injured people.
