= C. Janardhanan =

Indian politician

Chempottil Janardhanan is a Communist Party of India politician from Thrissur City. He was the Member of Parliament from Thrissur Lok Sabha constituency, Kerala, in 1967 and 1971.

== Biography ==
C. Janardhanan was born on April 2, 1919, the son of Parukutty Amma of Chempottil and Narayanan Nair of Engandiyoor Valley. Born into a wealthy family in Thrissur and well educated with all the facilities, Janardhanan decided to work for the Communist Party on behalf of the working and poor. While studying at St. Thomas College, Thrissur, he was an outstanding athlete. He was the first leader to play an important role in the formation of the AISF in the Kingdom of Cochin when the trumpet of the national freedom struggle was sounded. The first student federation was formed at St. Thomas College, Thrissur. For a long time he was the secretary of the Cochin Students' Federation.

He played an important role in moving the Communist Party forward in the catastrophic crisis of 1948 which the Communist Party had to survive. He was the one who gave a brave and adventurous leadership to the underground activities of the party in Thrissur district. As a result, his health deteriorated and he fell ill.

From 1951 to 1965 he served as the District Secretary of Thrissur for a period of one Thursday. It was at that time that the CPI grew into a mass-based party in the district.

From 1967 to 1977, he won the Thrissur Lok Sabha constituency and became an MP. He has also served as Chairman of Tetcos, Oushadhi and Silks.

His health had not allowed him to work in public since 1977. He left us on November 12, 1994.
