= P. V. Balakrishnan =

Indian judge

The Honourable Justice P. V. Balakrishnan

Judge of the Kerala High Court
- Incumbent
- Assumed office 30 October 2024
- Nominated by: D. Y. Chandrachud
- Appointed by: Droupadi Murmu

Personal details
- Pronunciation: P. V. Balakrishnan പി. വി. ബാലകൃഷ്ണൻ
- Born: 23 March 1975 (age 51) Madras
- Spouse: Ayswarya. N
- Education: Kerala Law Academy
- Website: High Court of Kerala

Pandikkaran Varadaraja Iyer Balakrishnan is an Indian judge who is presently serving as a judge of Kerala High Court. The High Court of Kerala is the highest court in the Indian state of Kerala and in the Union Territory of Lakshadweep. The High Court of Kerala is headquartered at Ernakulam, Kochi.

== Early life and education ==
Balakrishnan completed his schooling from St.Mary's School, Ashok Nagar, Madras, St.Joseph School, Tellicherry, NSS School, Manjeri and Model Boys High School, Trichur, Pre-Degree from St.Alberts College, Ernakulam, obtained graduation in Law from Kerala Law Academy and post graduation in Law from Cochin University, Ernakulam [CUSAT].

== Career ==
Balakrishnan enrolled as an advocate and started practice in 1999 at Ernakulam District including High Court mainly in civil, criminal, constitutional and motor accidents claims matters. He was recruited to the Kerala State Higher Judicial Service from bar as District and Sessions judge in 2014. Served as Additional District and Dessions judge, Thiruvananthapuram, Kozhikode and Mavelikkara, Special Judge, Special Police Establishment/Central Bureau of Investigation Court, Thiruvananthapauram, Principal District and Sessions Judge, Kasaragod and Thiruvananthapuram. He was elevated as additional judge of High Court of Kerala on 30 October 2024 and became permanent judge from 5 October 2026.
