= Abraham Koorilos I =

First primate of Malabar Independent Syrian Church

His Grace Abraham Mar Koorilos I Founder of the Malabar Independent Syrian Church
- Malabar Independent Syrian Church
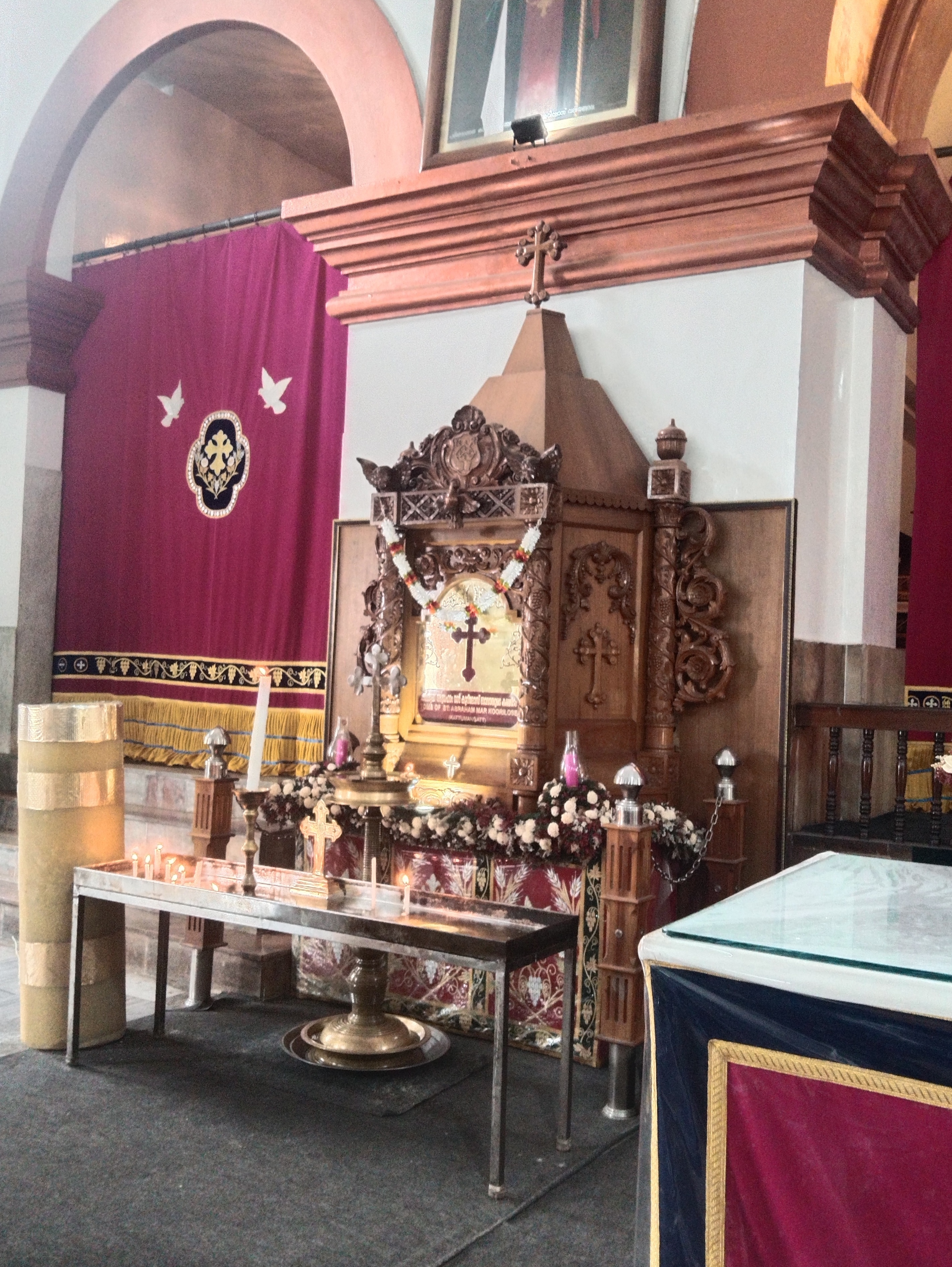
- Tomb of Abraham Mar Koorilos I at St. George's Cathedral Church, Thozhiyur
- Native name: Kattumanghattu Abraham Koorilos Valiya Bava
- Church: Malabar Independent Syrian Church
- Installed: 1772
- Term ended: 1802
- Successor: Geevargheese Koorilose II

Orders
- Consecration: by Gregorios of Jerusalem
- Rank: Thozhiyur Metropolitan

Personal details
- Born: Kerala, India
- Died: 10 July 1802
- Buried: St. George's Cathedral Church, Thozhiyur

Kattumanghattu Abraham Mar Koorilos I was the first primate and Metropolitan of the Malabar Independent Syrian Church in Kerala, India, although it was known initially as Thozhiyoor Church when established in 1772. Abraham Koorilos I is popularly known as Kattumangattu Valiya Bava.

Mar Koorilos I remained primate for 30 years from 1772 until his death on 10 July 1802. His brother succeeded him as primate of the church as Kattumangattu Geevarghese Mar Koorilose II until 1808.

== See also ==
- Malankara Church
