= K. Vinod Chandran =

Judge of the Supreme Court of India

The Honourable Mr. Justice Krishnan Vinod Chandran
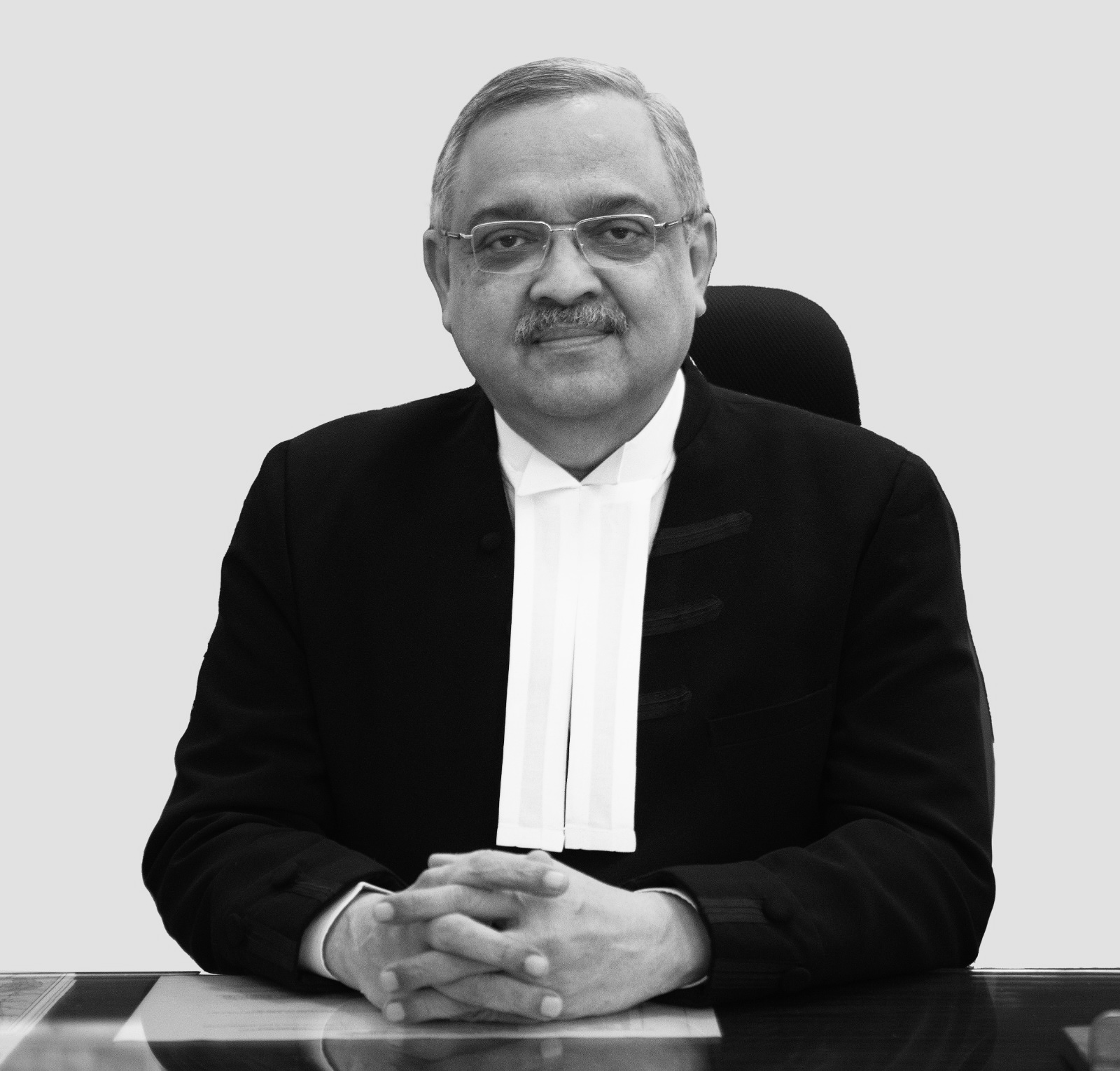
- Official Portrait 2025

Judge of Supreme Court of India
- Incumbent
- Assumed office 16 January 2025
- Nominated by: Sanjiv Khanna
- Appointed by: Droupadi Murmu

44th Chief Justice of Patna High Court
- In office 29 March 2023 – 15 January 2025
- Nominated by: Dhananjaya Y. Chandrachud
- Appointed by: Droupadi Murmu
- Preceded by: Sanjay Karol; C. S. SIngh (Acting)
- Succeeded by: Vipul Manubhai Pancholi; Ashutosh Kumar (Acting)

Judge of Kerala High Court
- In office 8 November 2011 – 28 March 2023
- Nominated by: S. H. Kapadia
- Appointed by: Pratibha Patil

Personal details
- Born: 25 April 1963 (age 63) North Paravur, Kerala
- Education: Kerala Law Academy
- Website: Supreme Court of India

Krishnan Vinod Chandran is a judge of the Supreme Court of India. He previously served as the 44th Chief Justice of the Patna High Court and as a judge of Kerala High Court.

== Career ==
After graduating from the Union Christian College, Aluva, Vinod Chandran was employed at the State Bank of Travancore in Kochi. During his stint at the bank, he enrolled as a law student at the Kerala Law Academy Law College, Thiruvananthapuram, and started his practice at Paravoor in the year 1991 and later extended to the High Court of Kerala. During his practice he served as Special Government Pleader (Taxes) of the Government of Kerala from 2007 to 2011.

Vinod Chandran was elevated as an Additional Judge of the Kerala High Court on 8 November 2011 and was made permanent on 24 June 2013. He was appointed as Chief Justice of Patna High Court on 29 March 2023. He also served as the chancellor of the Chanakya National Law University ex officio in such capacity. On 1 August 2023, Patna High Court's division bench, comprising Chief Justice K. Vinod Chandran and Justice Partha Sarathy, gave judgement that holding a caste survey in Bihar is valid and legal. The division bench passed the order in its 101-page verdict while dismissing all petitions challenging the survey.

On 16 January 2025, he took oath as a Judge of the Supreme Court of India.
