= Kerala Law Academy =

Private law college in Kerala, India

The Kerala Law Academy Law College, Thiruvananthapuram
- Type: Government Aided Law college
- Established: 21 October 1967; 59 years ago
- Affiliations: University of Kerala
- Location: Thiruvananthapuram, Kerala, India; 8.5395°N 76.966°E
- Website: www.keralalawacademy.in

The Kerala Law Academy Law College (KLA) is a self-financing law college in Thiruvananthapuram, Kerala, India. Founded in 1967, it is the first, and was for many years the only, self-financing law institution in the state. It is accredited by the Bar Council of India and affiliated to the University of Kerala.

KLA has both the three-year and the five-year LL.B programs (under the graduate stream of study) and the LL.M and M.B.L programs (under the post-graduate stream of study). The college has an active Moot Court Society and students of the society have also participated in various competitions held outside India. KLA also conducts a legal aid clinic to provide legal assistance to members of the underprivileged sections of the society.

== History ==
Kerala Law Academy was registered as a society on 17 October 1966 and inaugurated on 21 October 1967. In 1968, the college started functioning under the University of Kerala in the same year.

== Notable alumni ==
- V. D. Satheesan 13th Chief minister of Kerala
- Kurian Joseph, Judge, Supreme Court of India
- K. Vinod Chandran, Judge, Supreme Court of India
- P. V. Kunhikrishnan, Judge, High Court of Kerala
- K. Balakrishnan Nair, Judge, High Court of Kerala
- Raja Vijayaraghavan V., Judge, High Court of Kerala
- V. G. Arun, Judge, High Court of Kerala
- Basant Balaji, Judge, High Court of Kerala
- Anil K. Narendran, Judge, High Court of Kerala
- Jobin Sebastian, Judge, High Court of Kerala
- P. V. Balakrishnan, Judge, High Court of Kerala
- Preeta A. K., Judge, Kerala High Court
- Murali, Indian actor
- Mukesh, Indian actor, Ex Member of the Kerala Legislative Assembly
- Balachandra Menon, Indian actor
- M. Swaraj, Former MLA
- John Brittas, Indian journalist and Member of Parliament, Rajya Sabha
- C. S. Sujatha, Former Member of Parliament
- K. Muraleedharan, Politician, Health Minister, Kerala
- A. A. Rahim, Member of Parliament, Rajya Sabha
- Devi Ajith, Indian actress
- Mithun Ramesh, Indian actor, radio jockey and TV anchor
- K. N. Balagopal, MLA, former Finance Minister State of Kerala
- Anil Panachooran, Lyricist, Poet
- K. Rajan, Former Revenue Minister, State of Kerala, Member of Legislative Assembly
- Binoy Viswam, Former MP, Former Forest & Wildlife Minister, Government of Kerala
- G. R. Anil,MLA, Former Civil Supplies Minister, Government of Kerala
- K. K. Ragesh, former Member of Parliament
- Prabha Varma, Writer, Journalist
- Kadannappalli Ramachandran, former Minister, Government of Kerala
- Anoop Jacob, Minister State of Kerala
- V. S. Sunil Kumar, Former Agriculture Minister Govt of Kerala
- V. K. Prasanth, Ex MLA
- Simon Britto Rodrigues, Former MLA, Writer
- P. Santhosh Kumar, MP Rajya Sabha
- Shanimol Usman, MLA & Deputy speaker of Kerala Assembly
- V. S. Sivakumar, Former Health & Devaswam Minister State of Kerala
- K. Suresh Kurup, Former MP, MLA
- M. Vincent, MLA
- A. M. Ariff, Former Member of Parliament
- V. Sivankutty, Former Education Minister of Kerala
- K. P. Rajendran, Former Revenue Minister Government of Kerala
- Thomas Unniyadan, MLA Kerala Legislative Assembly Former Chief Whip, Kerala Legislative Assembly
- Eldhose Kunnappilly, Former MLA
- Joy Thomas, Politician
- Maala Parvathi, Indian actress
- K. S. Sabarinadhan, Former MLA & Ward councilor
- Abin Varkey Kodiyattu, MLA

== See also ==
- Government Law College, Thiruvananthapuram
- List of colleges in Thiruvananthapuram
- List of institutions of higher education in Kerala
