= Cyril Baselios I =

Metropolitan of Thozhiyoor

His Beatitude Cyril Mar Baselios I
- Metropolitan of Thozhiyoor
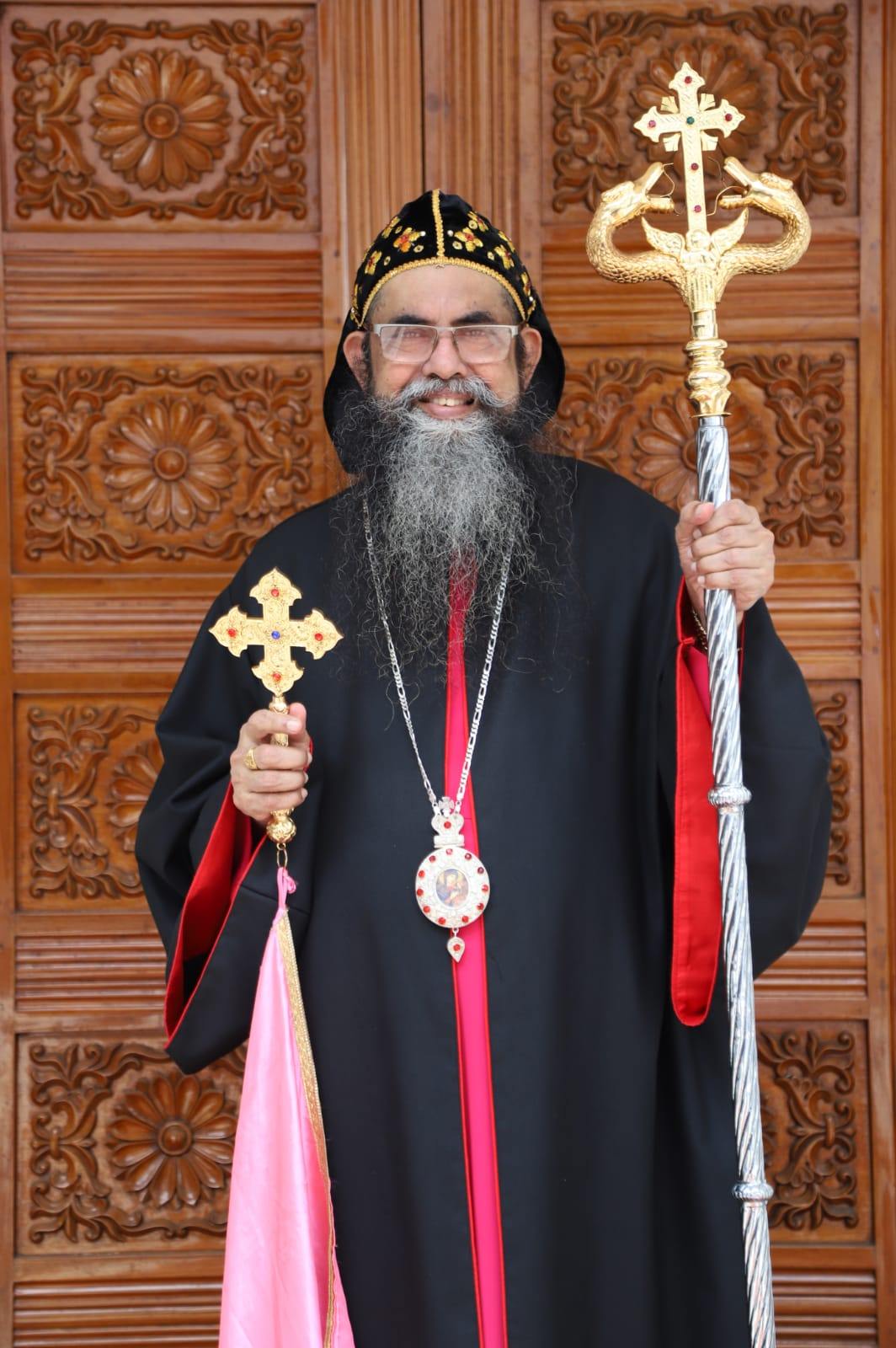
- Native name: സിറിൽ മാർ ബസേലിയോസ്
- Church: Malabar Independent Syrian Church
- Installed: 2001
- Predecessor: Joseph Mar Koorilose IX

Orders
- Ordination: 17 February 1980 by Mathews Mar Koorilose VIII
- Consecration: 28 May 2001 by Joseph Mar Koorilose IX
- Rank: Metropolitan

Personal details
- Born: K. C. Sunny; 30 July 1956 (age 70) Kunnamkulam

Cyril Mar Baselios I (born 30 July 1956 as C K Sunny) is the present Metropolitan of Thozhiyoor and Supreme Head of the Malabar Independent Syrian Church (Thozhiyoor Church). He is the 14th metropolitan of Thozhiyoor succeeding Joseph Mar Koorilose IX.

== Personal life ==
He was born on 30 July 1956 in Porkulam, near Kunnamkulam, to Kuthoor Chummar and Ammini. His father was an employee at a local rice mill.

He completed his primary and secondary education at the Porkulam Mar Koorilose Memorial School. He later attended Sri Krishna College, Guruvayur, for his Pre-Degree course. He earned a Bachelor’s degree in Commerce from the University of Calicut. Continuing his higher education, he obtained a degree in History from the University of Madras and a Post-Graduate degree in Psychology from Annamalai University.

== Career ==
He was ordained a deacon on 18 December 1975 at the Mar Adhai Sleeha Church by Ayyamkulam Paulose Mar Philexenos III, the 11th Metropolitan of the Church. He was ordained on 17 February 1980 by Mathews Mar Koorilose VIII, the 12th metropolitan of the Malabar Independent Syrian Church. He served for a long time as vicar in various parishes of the church. He has been the Vicar of St. George's Church, Chennai for a long time. He occupied the leadership positions of the Holy Church, the leadership positions of various organizations of the Church, and many official positions of the Church, including the Secretary of the Diocesan Church Reconstruction Committee. For a long time, Dayara was a priest in the palace of Thozhiyur diocese. He received the title of Ramban on 3 March 2001 and the title of Episcopa on 10 March 2001 from Panakkal Joseph Mar Koorilose IX, the 13th metropolitan. Following the resignation of Joseph Mar Koorilose IX on 28 May 2001, Cyril Mar Basselios was ordained as the 14th metropolitan

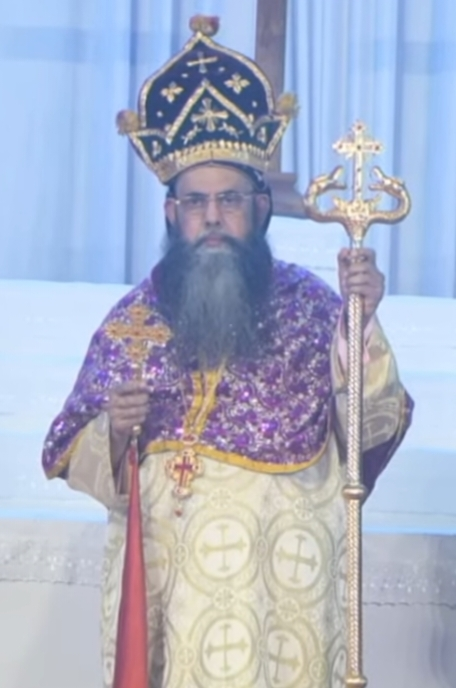
Thozhiyur Metropolitan Cyril Mar Baselios

== Ordination dates ==
Ordained as deacon: 18 December 1975
Ordained as kasseessa: 17 February 1980
Ordained as ramban: 3 March 2001
Consecrated as episcopa: 10 March 2001
Installed as metropolitan: 28 May 2001
