= Joy Thomas =

Indian politician

President, Kerala State Co-operative Consumers Federation Limited
- In office 2011–2016

Member, Idukki District Panchayat
- In office 1995–2000

District Congress Committee President, Idukki
- In office 2001–2007

Idukki District Cooperative Bank President
- In office 2001–2006

General Secretary Idukki District Congress Committee
- In office 1986–2001

President Idukki Indian Youth Congress
- In office 1985–1986
- President: Ramesh Chennithala
- Succeeded by: E.M Augusthy

State Vice President, Kerala Students Union
- In office 1981–1983

Personal details
- Party: Indian National Congress
- Education: Kerala Law Academy Law College; Government Law College

Joy Thomas is an Indian politician. He serves as President of the Kerala State Co-operative Consumers Federation Limited.

== Early life ==
Joy Thomas was born in Idukki, Idukki district of Kerala in a Syrian Catholic Christian family. Joy completed his Bachelor of Arts degree from New Man College, Thodupuzha and Bachelor of Law from Kerala Law Academy Law College, Thiruvananthapuram.

Joy Thomas started his political career at age 14. He worked for the Kerala Students Union in his hometown. He was noted by teachers and students for his sincere attitude towards the fight for equality. He won his classroom representative elections by a huge margin.

He continued to work for Kerala Students Union while studying in Kerala Law Academy Law College at Thiruvananthapuram. He was appointed State Vice President of the Kerala Students Union.

== Political career ==
He returned to Idukki after his education and was appointed as Idukki District President of the Indian Youth Congress. He was given the post as Idukki District General Secretary of District Congress Committee, a post he held until 2001. After the 2001 Kerala Assembly Elections, he was appointed as the President of Idukki District Congress Committee.

During the period, he was able to wrestle the control of the Idukki District Co-operative Bank from the Left Democratic Front and was appointed as its president for a five-year term. He held the post until the 2006 Kerala Assembly Elections. He was then appointed as the Idukki District UDF Chairman.
