= Government Arts College, Thiruvananthapuram =

College in Kerala, India

- Type: Public
- Established: 4 July 1924; 102 years ago
- Affiliations: University of Kerala
- Location: Thiruvananthapuram, Kerala, India
- Campus: Urban
- Website: gactvm.org

Government Arts College, Thiruvananthapuram is a public college situated in Thiruvananthapuram, Kerala, India. Established in 1924 as the H. H. The Maharaja's College of Arts, it is one of the oldest colleges in Kerala. The college is affiliated with University of Kerala. It offers programmes in arts and science.

== History ==
The college was created in 1924 in a split from H.H. The Maharaja's College. Initially offering only under-graduate courses in economics, history, Sanskrit and Dravidian languages, and English, it began offering courses in Malayalam and a post-graduate course in Sanskrit in 1935 and 1936, respectively.

The college was renamed as H.H. the Maharaja's University College, Thiruvananthapuram in 1937.

== Accreditation ==
The college is recognized by the University Grants Commission (UGC).

== Notable alumni ==
- G. Venugopal, Playback singer
- K. B. Ganesh Kumar, Actor, MLA, Transport minister government of Kerala
- P.V. Jagadish Kumar, Actor
- Justice Bechu Kurian Thomas
- Keerikkadan Jose, Actor
- Chelangatt Gopalakrishnan, Film Journalist
- Aiyappan Pillai, Lawyer, Politician
