= Rambani =

Rambani may refer to:

- anything of, from, or related to Ramban district, a region of India
- Rambani dialect, spoken in the district
- Ntando Rambani (née Duma, born 1995), South African actress, television personality, and model

== See also ==
- Ramban (disambiguation)
