= Malabar Independent Syrian Church =

Oriental Orthodox church in India

- Type: Independent church
- Classification: Christian
- Orientation: Syriac
- Theology: Miaphysite
- Polity: Oriental
- Metropolitan: Cyril Mar Baselios I
- Region: Kerala
- Language: West Syriac; Malayalam
- Liturgy: West Syriac Rite
- Founder: Kattumangattu Abraham Mar Koorilose I
- Origin: 1772
- Separated from: Malankara Church
- Congregations: 15 Parishes and 5 Chapels
- Members: 35,000
- Ministers: 10–15
- Hospitals: 1
- Primary schools: 3
- Secondary schools: 1
- Other names: Thozhiyoor Church; Anjoor Church
- Official website: misc.co.in

The Malabar Independent Syrian Church (MISC), also known as the Thozhiyoor Church, is an Independent Oriental Orthodox church centred in Kerala, India. It is one of the churches of the Saint Thomas Christian community, which traces its origins to the evangelical activity of Thomas the Apostle in the 1st century.

This group split off from the main body of India's Malankara Church in 1772 and was confirmed as an independent church with its current name after a high court verdict in 1862. Although the church is independent, the church's doctrines and traditions are similar to the Oriental Orthodox, adhering to the West Syriac Rite and consistently using western Syriac and Malayalam during the Holy Qurbono (Qurbono Qadisho). The Eucharistic Celebration is popularly known as Holy Qurbana due to the historical influence of the Church of the East.

The church has about 35,000 members.

A diagram showing the history of the divisions among the Saint Thomas Christians (click to enlarge)

== History ==
The Saint Thomas Christians trace their origins to Thomas the Apostle, who according to tradition, evangelized in India in the 1st century. By the 7th century they were part of the Church of the East, centred in Persia. The entire community remained united until the 17th century, when disputes with the Portuguese padroado in India led to the Coonan Cross Oath of 1653 and the division of the Saint Thomas Christians into Syro-Malabar Church and Malankara Syrian Church. The Malankara Church functioned as a diocese of the Syriac Orthodox Church of Antioch.

However, relations between the clergies within the Malankara Syrian Church were sometimes strained. In 1772 Bishop Gregorios, a representative of the Syriac Orthodox hierarchy from the Middle East, had grown dissatisfied with how the Metropolitan Dionysius I had treated him. Against Dionysius' wishes, Gregorios consecrated as bishop, the monk Kattumangatt Kurien, in a secret but canonically legitimate ceremony. The new bishop took the name Cyril (Koorilos), and he was designated Gregorios' sole heir.

Cyril claimed authority over the parishes of Cochin, and initially received the support of the Raja of Cochin. However, Dionysus saw him as a threat to his power, and in 1774 he appealed to the Raja and to the British authorities in India to suppress the rival bishop. Cyril left for Thozhiyoor, Kerala outside their jurisdiction, and established what would become an independent church. This was the first of several groups to split from the Malankara Church.

Cyril's church was always small, but maintained stability by attracting devoted priests and emphasizing regularity in the ecclesiastical order. In 1794 Cyril consecrated his brother Geevarghese as bishop; Geevarghese succeeded Cyril as Cyril II in 1802, and the succession has proceeded unbroken since.

As a result of an 1862 court case, the Madras High Court confirmed the Thozhiyur church was an independent Malankara church, and it has subsequently been known as the Malabar Independent Syrian Church.

== Ecumenical relations ==
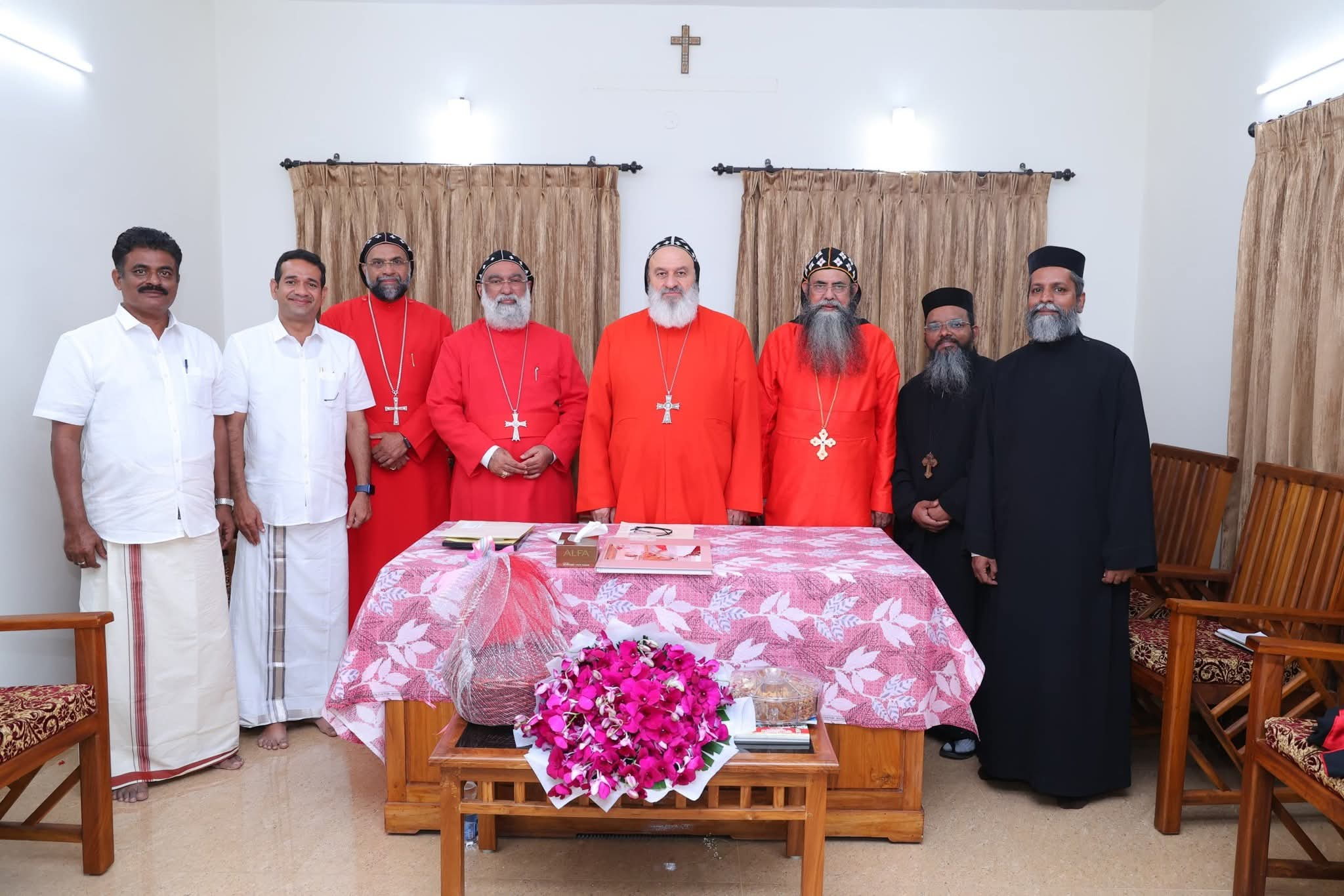
Metropolitan Cyril Mar Baselios of the Malabar Independent Syrian Church with Patriarch Ignatius Aphrem II of the Syriac Orthodox Church and Baselios Joseph during an ecumenical meeting.

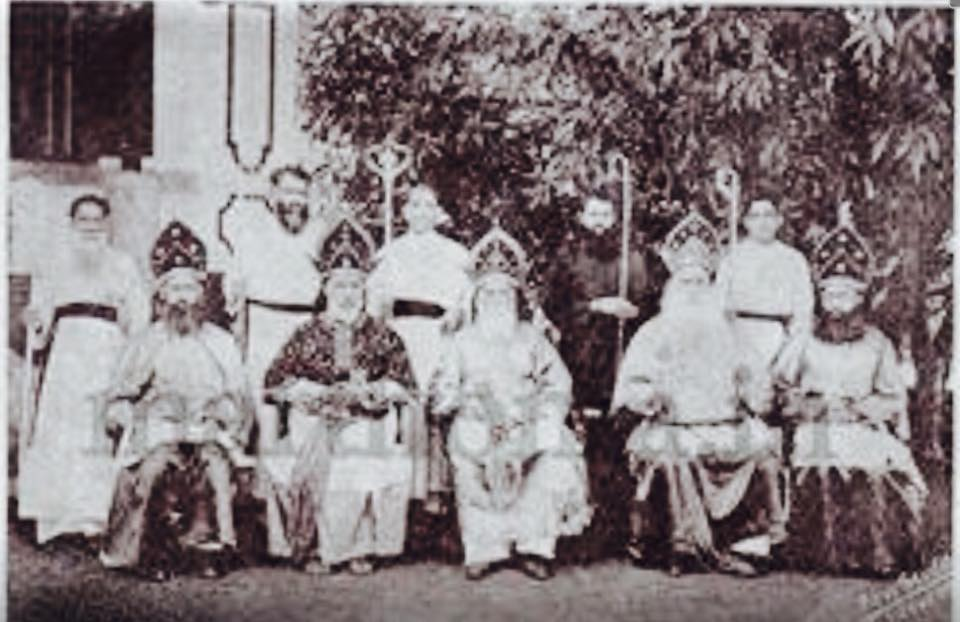
Group photo taken during the ordinations of Juhanon Thimothious (later Juhanon Thoma) and Mathews Athanasius, by Titus II Mar Thoma, Abraham Mar Thoma and Metropolitan of Thozhiyoor Kuriakose Koorilos

The Malabar Independent Syrian Church is a member of the Christian Conference of Asia, the National Council of Churches in India, and the Kerala Council of Churches. The Malabar Independent Syrian Church maintains good relations with the other Malankara churches. Despite its small size, it has had a significant impact on the history of the Saint Thomas Christian community. On several occasions Thoziyur bishops have stepped in to consecrate bishops for the other churches when the episcopal succession, and therefore the churches themselves, were in danger. Philoxenos II Kidangan (1811–1829) of the Thozhiyur Church consecrated three successive bishops in the unified Malankara Church: Dionysius II on 22 March 1816, Dionysius III on 19 October 1817, and Dionysius IV on 27 August 1825.

=== Mar Thoma Syrian Church ===
In 1894 Athanasius and Koorilose V consecrated Titus I Mar Thoma for the Reformed Syrians, later known as the Malankara Mar Thoma Syrian Church. On subsequent occasions when the Thozhiyur Metropolitan has died without consecrating a successor, the Metropolitan and bishops of the Malankara Mar Thoma Syrian Church had performed the consecration. Thozhiyur bishops have taken part in all Mar Thoma episcopal ordinations up to the present.

=== Anglican churches ===
Ecumenical links have also developed with the Anglican churches. Joseph Mar Koorilose IX was the first metropolitan of the church to travel abroad. In 1989, he met the Archbishop of Canterbury, Robert Runcie in England. During this visit, Koorilose IX expressed willingness to celebrate the Eucharist with Church of England congregations. In 1991, he visited England again as an official guest for the installation of George Carey as the Archbishop of Canterbury. During both visits Koorilose IX celebrated the Eucharist during Anglican services, sometimes alongside Church of England bishops.

As a result of the efforts of Koorilose IX and Church of England priest Peter Hawkins, a charitable support group to provide financial help to the Malabar Independent Syrian Church was founded in the UK. In recognition of his services to the Thozhiyur Church, Koorilose IX consecrated Very Revd Hawkins as Chorepiscopa.

In 1998 and 2008, Thozhiyur Church metropolitans were ecumenical observers at the Lambeth Conference of Anglican bishops. In 2001, bishop Sam Mathew of the Madhya Kerala Diocese of the Church of South India was a co-consecrator for the bishopric consecration of Cyril Baselios I. In 2003, Baselios I went to the UK as an official guest for the installation of Rowan Williams as the Archbishop of Canterbury. In July 2006 Koorilose IX and Baselios I participated as co-consecrators for the bishopric consecrations of Paul Hunt and John Fenwick as bishops of the Free Church of England.

== Thozhiyoor metropolitans ==
The metropolitans of the Malabar Independent Syrian Church:

1. St. Abraham Mar Koorilose I (1772–1802)
2. St. Geevarghese Mar Koorilose II (1802–1808)
3. Joseph Mar Ivanios - Suffragon Metropolitan (1807) (6 months only)
4. Zacharias Mar Philoxenos I (1807–1811)
5. Geevarghese Mar Philoxenos II - Malankara Metropolitan (1811–1829)
6. Ghevarghese Mar Koorilose III (1829–1856)
7. Joseph Mar Koorilose IV (1856–1888)
8. Joseph Mar Athanasius I (1888–1898)
9. Geevarghese Mar Koorilose V (1898–1935)
10. Paulose Mar Athanasios - Suffragan Metropolitan (1917–1927)
11. Kuriakose Mar Koorilose VI (1936–1947)
12. Ghevarghese Mar Koorilose VII (1948–1967)
13. Paulose Mar Philoxenos III (1967–1977) (joined the Syro-Malankara Catholic Church and replaced)
14. Mathews Mar Koorilose VIII (1978–1986)
15. Joseph Mar Koorilose IX (1986–2001)
16. Cyril Mar Baselios I (2001–present)

== List of parishes ==
15 parishes,congregations and 5 chapels are under Malabar Independent Syrian Church.

No.	Type	Name	Location	District/City	State/Country	Notes
1	Parish	St. George's Cathedral Church	Thozhiyoor	Thrissur	Kerala, India	
2	Parish	St. George's Church	Perambur	Chennai	Tamil Nadu, India	
3	Parish	St. Thomas' Church	Kunnamkulam	Thrissur	Kerala, India	
4	Parish	St. George's Church	Karikkad	Thrissur	Kerala, India	
5	Parish	Mar Koorilose Church	Korattikara	Thrissur	Kerala, India	
6	Parish	St. Adhai's Church	Porkulam	Thrissur	Kerala, India	
7	Parish	St. Mary's Church	Pazhanji	Thrissur	Kerala, India	
8	Parish	St. George Church	Kallumpuram	Thrissur	Kerala, India	
9	Parish	St. Augin's Church	Chalissery	Palakkad	Kerala, India	
10	Parish	St. Mary's Church	Perummannoor	Palakkad	Kerala, India	
11	Parish	St. George's Church	Peringode	Palakkad	Kerala, India	
12	Parish	Mar Koorilose Bava Church	Ernakulam	Ernakulam	Kerala, India	
13	Parish	St. George's Church	Coimbatore	Coimbatore	Tamil Nadu, India	
14	Parish	St. George Church	Hesaraghatta	Bangalore	Karnataka, India	
15	Parish	St. Mary's Church	Aurangabad	Aurangabad	Maharashtra, India	
—	Congregation	St. Koorilose Congregation	Sharjah	Sharjah	UAE	
—	Congregation	St. Koorilose Congregation	—	—	Bahrain	
—	Chapel	St. George's Chapel	Akathiyur	Thrissur	Kerala, India	
—	Chapel	Mar Bahanan Chapel	Anjoor Bazar	Thrissur	Kerala, India	
—	Chapel	Sleeba (Cross Memorial) Chapel	Thozhiyoor	Thrissur	Kerala, India	
—	Chapel	Mar Koorilose Bava Chapel	Ottapilave	Thrissur	Kerala, India	
—	Chapel	St. George Chapel	Thiruthikkad	Thrissur	Kerala, India	

== See also ==
- Malankara Orthodox Syrian Church
- Jacobite Syrian Christian Church
- Syriac Orthodox Church
- Malankara Mar Thoma Syrian Church (Mar Thoma Church)
