= Muttambalam =

- Neighborhood
- Country: India
- State: Kerala
- District: Kottayam
- Talukas: Kottayam

Languages
  - Official: Malayalam, English
- Time zone: UTC+5:30 (IST)
- PIN: 686004
- Vehicle registration: KL-05

Muttambalam is a neighbourhood of Kottayam city in Kottayam district in the state of Kerala, India.
