= Jobin Sebastian =

Indian judge

The Honourable Justice Jobin Sebastian

Judge of the Kerala High Court
- Incumbent
- Assumed office 30 October 2024
- Nominated by: D. Y. Chandrachud
- Appointed by: Droupadi Murmu

Personal details
- Pronunciation: Jobin Sebastian ജോബിൻ സെബാസ്റ്റ്യൻ
- Born: 27 April 1975 (age 51) Neeloor Kottayam district Kerala
- Education: Kerala Law Academy
- Website: High Court of Kerala

Jobin Sebastian is an Indian judge who is presently serving as a judge of Kerala High Court. The High Court of Kerala is the highest court in the Indian state of Kerala and in the Union Territory of Lakshadweep. The High Court of Kerala is headquartered at Ernakulam, Kochi.

== Early life and education ==
Sebastian completed his schooling from St. Joseph's English Medium High School, Neeloor, graduation from St. Joseph's College, Moolamattam and obtained graduation in Law from Kerala Law Academy.

== Career ==
Sebastian enrolled as an advocate and started practice in 1998 at Idukki and Kottayam Districts mainly in civil and criminal matters. He was directly recruited from bar as District and Sessions judge in 2014. Served as Additional District and Dessions judge, Thiruvananthapuram and Mavelikara, Special Additional District Judge for the trial of cases relating to atrocities against Women & Children, Thiruvananthapuram, Enquiry Commissioner and Special Judge, Muvattupuzha, Principal District & Sessions Judge, Alappuzha and Registrar (District Judiciary), High Court of Kerala. He was elevated as additional judge of High Court of Kerala on 30 October 2024 and became permanent judge from 5 October 2026.
