= Mohammed Nias C. P =

Indian judge

Justice Mohammed Nias C. P.

Judge of the Kerala High Court
- Incumbent
- Assumed office 13 August 2021
- Nominated by: Sharad Arvind Bobde
- Appointed by: Ram Nath Kovind

Personal details
- Born: 16 April 1970 (age 56)
- Education: Government Law College, Kozhikode
- Website: High Court of Kerala

Mohammed Nias Chovvakkaran Puthiyapurayil is an Indian judge serving on the Kerala High Court. The High Court of Kerala is the highest court in the Indian state of Kerala and in the Union Territory of Lakshadweep. The High Court of Kerala is headquartered at Ernakulam, Kochi.

== Education and career ==
Mohammed Nias graduated in law from Government Law College, Kozhikode, was admitted to the bar in 1995 and started independent practice in 2003. He served as Standing Counsel for Calicut University, State Co-operative Union, Kerala State Rubber Co-operative Union (RUBCO) and Greater Cochin Development Authority during his practice. He was appointed as Additional Judge of High Court of Kerala on 11 August 2021 and assumed office on 13 August 2021.

== Notable rulings ==
=== Proceedings against the Popular Front of India ===
In 2022, pointing out various Articles in the Constitution of India, the bench consisting of Justice Jayasankaran Nambiar and Justice Nias initiated suo motu contempt of court proceedings against Popular Front of India for calling strike on 23 September 2022 without seven days notice in connection with the nationwide raids on Popular Front of India offices and arrests of its leaders by the National Investigation Agency and causing damages to public properties and Kerala State Road Transport Corporation. The bench directed the organisation and its officials to deposit an initial compensation of Rs. 5.2 crores (Rs. 52 million) with the State Government, towards the damages caused in the illegal strike. In December 2022 the State Government tendered an unconditional apology to the bench for delays in executing the court’s recovery orders of the bench.
