= Ramban =

Ramban can refer to:

- Nachmanides (1194 – c. 1270), Catalan rabbi and philosopher also known as RaMBaN
- Cave of the Ramban in Jerusalem
- Ramban, Jammu and Kashmir, a town in India
  - Ramban district, an administrative unit in India
  - Ramban (Vidhan Sabha constituency)
- Ramban Synagogue in Jerusalem
- Rambaan, 1948 Indian film
- Ramabanam, 2023 Indian film
- Ranban, a village in Nepal

== See also ==
- Rambani (disambiguation)
- Maimonides (1135/38 - 1204), Sephardic Jewish philosopher also known as Rambam
