= Devan Ramachandran =

Indian Judge (born 1968)

The Honourable Justice Devan Ramachandran
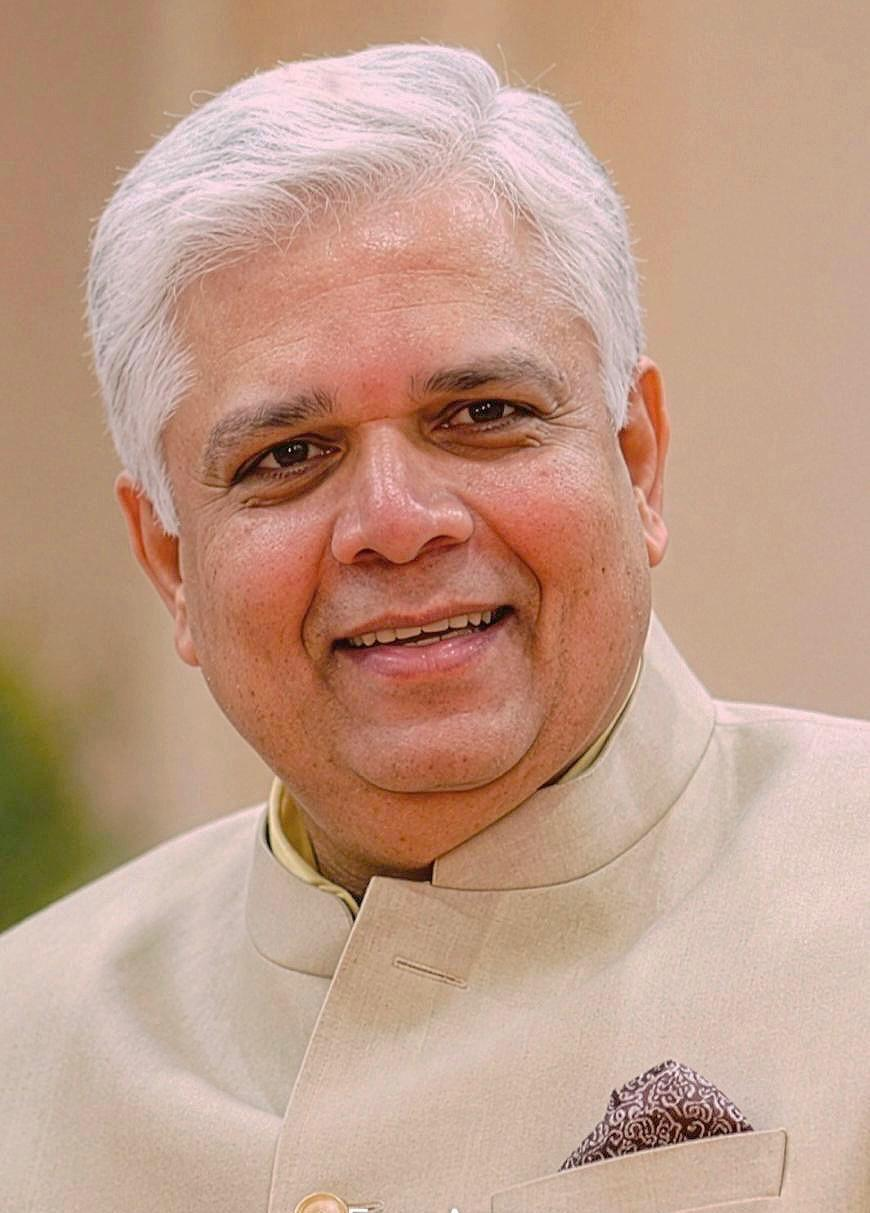

Judge of Kerala High Court
- Incumbent
- Assumed office 5 October 2016

Personal details
- Pronunciation: Devan Ramachandran ദേവൻ രാമചന്ദ്രൻ
- Born: 19 March 1968 (age 58) Ernakulam, Kerala
- Citizenship: Indian
- Website: High Court of Kerala

Devan Ramachandran (born 19 March 1968) is an Indian judge presently serving as a judge of Kerala High Court, the highest court in the Indian state of Kerala and in the Union Territory of Lakshadweep.

== Early life and education ==
Devan Ramachandran did his schooling at Bhavans Vidya Mandir, Ernakulam. He then studied at Sacred Heart College, Kochi, and graduated in law from Government Law College, Ernakulam.

== Career ==
He started practice as an advocate in March 1991, under the guidance of his father, Senior Advocate Mr. M.P.R. Nair, Barrister-at-Law (Middle Temple- London). He practiced in various branches of law, including constitutional, corporate, financial and civil.

The Kerala High Court had engaged Sri Devan Ramachandran, at the young age of 33, to be its counsel; And he also served as standing counsel for the CBSE, various private and public companies, many banking and financial institutions, including the Indian Banks' Association, the principal financial advisory mechanism to Reserve Bank of India.

== Achievements ==
He was designated as a 'Senior Advocate' by the High Court of Kerala, in 2015.

The High Court of Kerala had also appointed Justice Devan, while he was a Counsel, to assist as an Amicus Curiae (friend of court) in a socially charged suo motu Public Interest Litigation pertaining to the illegal trafficking of children from North India to Kerala.

The Indian Express recognised Justice Ramachandran as a newsmaker in 2019 for his judgments that impacted public life.

== Notable cases ==
In a judgment, a Larger Bench (5 judges) headed by Justice Devan Ramachandran, ruled that offenders repeatedly found in possession of even a “small quantity” of drugs and psychotropic substances can be declared as “Goonda” under the KAAPA Act and preventively detained.

To rid roads and public spaces of Kerala from the annoying unauthorised flex boards, flags, festoons etc., the Single Bench of Justice Devan propounded the principles of "Visual pollution" and "destination aesthetics" in a recent judgment.

Under the principle of "continuing Mandamus" Justice Devan's Court has been monitoring the condition of roads in Kerala, ordering that engineers will be held accountable for bad and potholed roads.

After the flood in the monsoons of 2018, Justice Devan Ramachandran has been constantly monitoring the monsoon preparedness of the city of Kochi, through a matter relating to the upkeep of the Perandoor Canal and the drainage systems; and consequently, the city has been relatively free of flooding.

Division Bench of Justices Devan Ramachandran and M B Snehalatha has emphatically declared that a woman or girl cannot be judged by the dress they wear.

Justice Devan sentenced a police officer to imprisonment for having misbehaved with a citizen. In an earlier judgment, the same Court had declared the use of disrespectful and abusive vocatives by Police like "eda", "nee" etc. against citizens to be "relics of the colonial subjugatory tactics and hence unconstitutional. The State Police Chief then issued a circular to officers not to use such words to address citizens.

Pushing for full bodily autonomy for women, especially as regards reproductive rights, the Judge declared that for every girl and woman "her body is her right."

In May, 2023, a young doctor, Dr.Vandana Das, was murdered while on duty. The Division Bench of Justice Devan Ramachandran pulled up the government and law enforcement, calling the victim “Our daughter”. Finally the Healthcare Act was enacted, providing very strict punishment for attackers. Consequently, attacks on doctors and healthcare persons in Kerala reduced drastically.

Allowing the plea of young girl students challenging the "curfew" imposed on them to leave and enter their hostels, Justice Ramachandran held that "no gate, no lock, no bolt, can set upon the freedom of the kind of a girl".

In a move for Kerala as an investor friendly destination, Justice Ramachandran declared illegal the long continuing ill practice of Trade Unions to extort money as gawking charges (called "nokkukooli" in Malayalam).

In 2020, Justice Ramachandran, sitting with Justice Ravi, directed the Government to anonymise the Covid 19 data before it is handed over to Sprinklr ( a foreign company) for processing. The Columbia University Journal has hailed this order to be "extra ordinary" from the angle of data protection.

Protecting environment and ecology, banned the use of plastics at the Sabarimala Hills and shrine, including in the "irumudikettu", the traditional offering carried by pilgrims. Government of Kerala then banned single-use plastics in state.
