= K. M. Chandy =

Indian Freedom Fighter, Indian politician (1921–1998)

Kizhakkayil Mathai Chandy
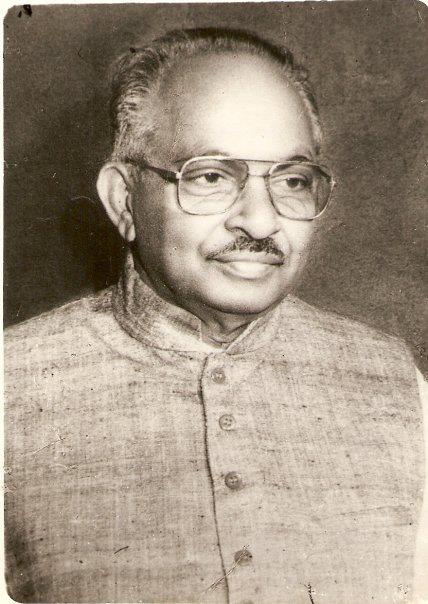
- Prof. K. M. Chandy

8th Governor of Madhya Pradesh
- In office 30 December 1987 – 30 March 1989
- Chief Minister: Motilal Vora; Arjun Singh
- Preceded by: Narayan Dutta Ojha (Acting)
- Succeeded by: Sarla Grewal
- In office 15 May 1984 – 30 November 1987
- Chief Minister: Arjun Singh; Motilal Vora
- Preceded by: B. D. Sharma
- Succeeded by: Narayan Dutta Ojha (Acting)

6th Governor of Gujarat
- In office 6 August 1983 – 26 April 1984
- Chief Minister: Madhav Singh Solanki
- Preceded by: Sharda Mukherjee
- Succeeded by: Braj Kumar Nehru

7th Lieutenant Governor of Puducherry
- In office 15 May 1982 – 5 August 1983
- Chief Minister: M. D. R. Ramachandran
- Preceded by: R.N. Haldipur
- Succeeded by: Kona Prabhakara Rao

President of the Kerala Pradesh Congress Committee
- In office January 1978 – May 1982
- Preceded by: K. C. Abraham
- Succeeded by: S. Varadarajan Nair

Member of the Travancore State Legislature Assembly
- In office 1948–1951

Member of the Travancore–Cochin Legislative Assembly
- In office 1952–1957

Personal details
- Born: Kizhakkayil Mathai Chandy; 6 August 1921 Pala, Travancore, British India (Now in Kerala, India)
- Died: 7 September 1998 (aged 77) Lisie Hospital, Ernakulam, Kerala, India
- Party: Indian National Congress
- Spouse: Mariakutty Chandy (m. 1939)
- Children: 10
- Education: St. Berchmans College University College Thiruvananthapuram
- Occupation: Politician Professor (St. Thomas College, Palai)
- Website: www.kmchandy.org
- As of 11 July 2020

Kizhakkayil Mathai Chandy (6 August 1921 – 7 September 1998) was an Indian Freedom fighter, Indian National Congress leader, Member of the Travancore–Cochin Legislative Assembly who also served as the governor of the Indian states of Gujarat, Madhya Pradesh and the Union Territory of Pondicherry. From 1948 to 1951, he served as a member of the Travancore State Legislature. From 1952 to 1954, he served as a M.L.A. in the Travancore-Cochin Legislative Assembly. He was also the former president of Kerala Pradesh Congress Committee (KPCC) and chairman of Rubber Board.

He was elected unanimously to the State Legislature after Independence at the age of 26 and he was re-elected in 1952 and 1954. Chandy was mainly responsible for the establishment and growth of many big co-operative institutions in Kerala. The first ever Youth Congress Unit was started by him in the year 1953. He founded the Meenachil Co-operative Land Mortgage Bank. He was also the Founder of the Palai Co-operative Marketing Society. The Kerala State Rubber Marketing Federation was founded by him in 1971. He founded the Indian Rubber Growers Association in 1966. The present B. Tech. Course in rubber technology in the Cochin University is his brainchild. It was at his insistence that India joined the Association of Natural Rubber Producing Countries (ANRPC). He led a large number of delegations from India to conferences of International Rubber Study Group, Association of Natural Rubber Producing Countries (ANRPC), International Rubber Research Development Board held at London, Kuala Lumpur, Bangkok, Singapore, etc. from 1972 to 1978.

== Early life ==
K. M. Chandy was born on 6 August 1921 at Pala in Kottayam District as the son of Mariyam and Mathai of the Kizhakkayil family. He had three younger brothers including Pala K.M. Mathew (Former Member Of Parliament) and a sister. He had his schooling in his home town Palai and College education at St. Berchmans College Changanacherry and Trivandrum. He completed his M.A. in English Language and literature in 1942.

== Personal life ==
He was married to Mariakutty Chandy in the year 1939 at the age of 18. They have eight sons and two daughters.

== Path into Politics and Advocacy ==
Chandy's entry into the world of politics was marked by youthful zeal and an unwavering commitment to justice. During his tenure as an intermediate student at St. Berchman's College in Changanacherry, he exhibited extraordinary leadership. At age of 17, he orchestrated a courageous student's strike protest. This protest was in response to a brutal lathi charge on students in Trivandrum who had gathered to express their support for State Congress leaders. He and a few of his companions though expelled from the College had to be taken back unconditionally following a mass Satyagraha at the college gates.

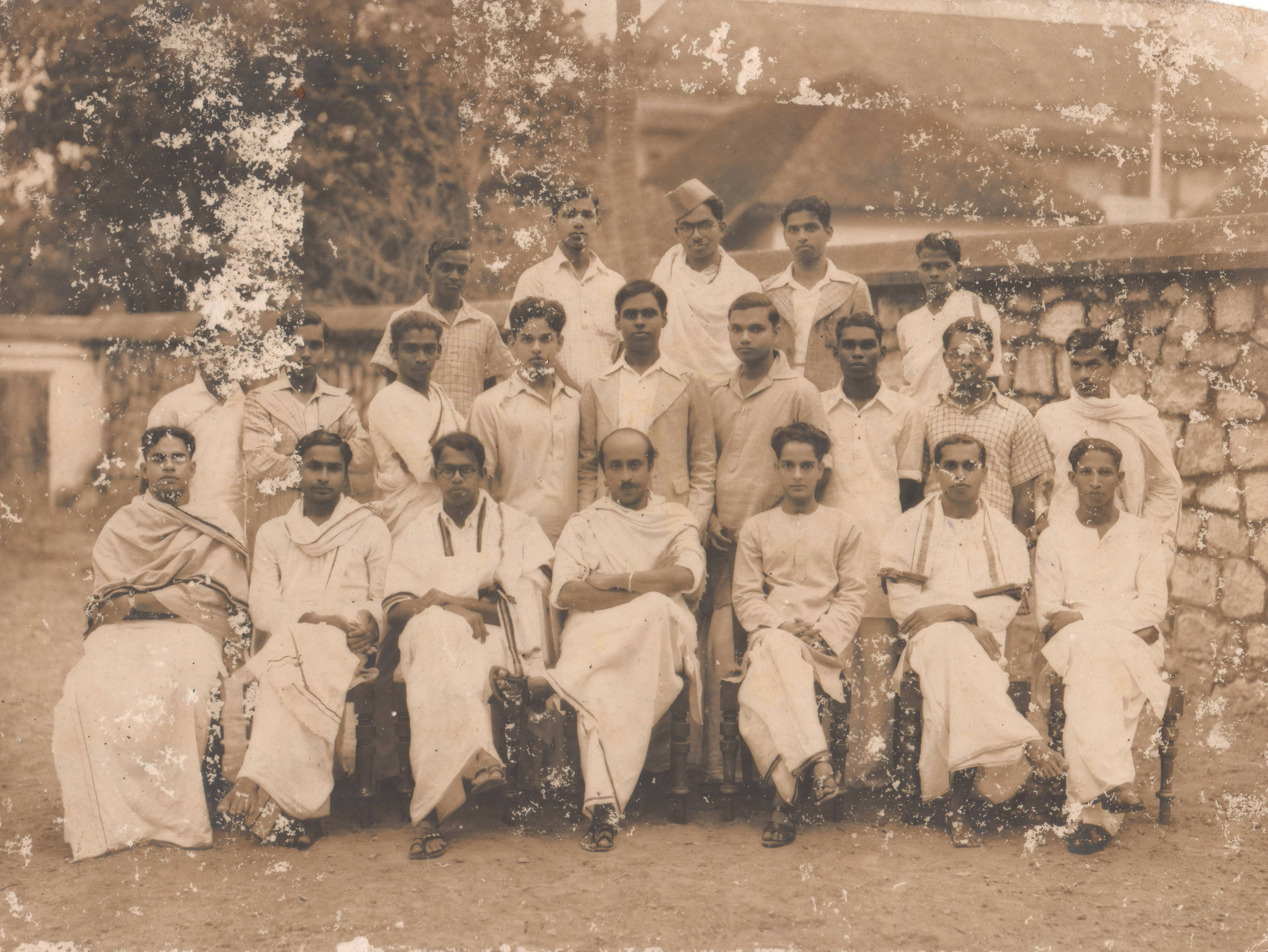
Tagore Academy Left to right:- Prof.K.M. Chandy (3rd row, 3rd), K. R. Narayanan (2nd row, 7th), Stalwart G. Ramachandran(1st row, 4th), K.P. Hormis (1st row, 3rd)

As he pursued his Honours course in English literature at University College Trivandrum, Chandy played a pivotal role in the establishment of the "Tagore Academy". This institution, founded under the guidance of the esteemed Gandhian leader Shri G. Ramachandran, aimed to infuse education with nationalist ideals. They discussed Gandhian ideology, nationalism, Tagore literature and Tagore's poems. Mr. Chandy could manage to enroll several students, who were not involved in politics in Tagore Academy. K. R. Narayanan (Former President of India) was one among them.

Sir C. P. Ramaswami Iyer (Sir CP) was the Diwan of Travancore and he ruled the kingdom with iron fist. The Diwan sensed the danger from the activity of the academy and banned "Tagore Academy" in 1942 due to its association with fostering patriotic sentiments among students and youth.

== Involvement in the Freedom Movement ==
The year 1946 marked a significant turning point in Chandy's life, as he immersed himself in the fervor of the freedom movement. Serving as the Secretary of the Meenachil Taluk Congress Committee, his ardor for political activism attracted the attention of the state government.

In mid-April 1946, Prof. K.M. Chandy received two orders from magistrates, one from the Thiruvananthapuram magistrate and the other from the Kottayam magistrate, both banning him from organizing public meetings and processions. Despite the orders, Prof. Chandy defiantly attended a protest meeting in Pala. Subsequently, another Congress meeting was convened in Pala. In July, Prof. Chandy, along with Mr. Kumbalathu Sanku Pillai, Mr. C. Kesavan, Mr. G. Nilakanta Pillai, Mr. Ponkunnam Varkey, Mr. D. C. Kizhakemuri, Mr. Cherian J. Kappan, and Mr. Mathew Manniankadan, were arrested from Pala.

Prof. Chandy was arrested for violating prohibitory orders and was denied bail by the Pala court. Subsequently, he was transferred to Kottayam, where he remained in lockup until he obtained bail from the high court. However, after two weeks, he was arrested again under preventive custody rules and sent to Poojappura Central Jail in Thiruvananthapuram. Upon his arrival at the central jail, he found Congress leaders such as Mr. C. Kesavan, Mr. Kumbalathu Sanku Pillai, and Mr. G. Nilakanda Pillai already imprisoned. Prof. Chandy, being the youngest among the prisoners at only 24 years old, had the opportunity to interact closely with senior leaders during his imprisonment.

The authorities decided to bring Prof. Chandy to Kottayam to stand trial in court. He was kept in Kottayam Sub Jail for two months, sharing a cell with Mr. Thankappan and Mr. Sugunanthan, Communist workers suspected of involvement in the Punnapra-Vayalar uprising. They became friends, and Prof. Chandy had the chance to acquaint himself with several Communist leaders during his stay at Kottayam prison, including Mr. K.C. Mathew and Mr. P. S. Sreenivasan. In November, Prof. Chandy was convicted and sentenced to one and a half years in prison. He was then again moved to Thiruvananthapuram Central Jail.

On 15 August 1947 India gained independence, and the prisoners along with Chandy celebrated this occasion in jail. However, since Travancore had not yet become part of independent India, political prisoners were not released. After Sir C. P. Ramaswami Iyer secretly resigned and left the Travancore Kingdom, all political prisoners were eventually released. Prof. K.M. Chandy regained his freedom in September 1947.

== Political Ascent and Legislative Journey ==
The Travancore State Congress was established in February 1938 under the presidency of Shri Pattom A. Thanu Pillai. Shri K.M. Chandy entered Travancore politics at the age of 17 in 1938. Along with other young Congress leaders, he advocated for joining the Indian union. In September 1947, a new Diwan formed a fifteen-member committee to draft a new Constitution for the state and propose the formation of a representative legislature. Shri Chandy proposed amending the objective to "a sovereign government elected by the people of Travancore."

When it was time to select Congress candidates for the new assembly, the Meenachil Taluk Congress committee suggested Mr.Chandy's name. Consequently, Shri K.M. Chandy was elected unopposed from the Poonjar constituency. On 14 March 1948 the first people's ministry of Travancore came into existence, with Shri. Pattom A. Thanu Pillai as the Prime Minister. The Pattom ministry lasted only eight months and resigned on 10 October 1948. A new ministry under Shri T.K. Narayana Pillai took oath on 23 October 1948.

In 1949, after the merger of Travancore and Cochin princely states with the Indian Union, the two existing assemblies were amalgamated into the Travancore-Cochin assembly, and on 1 July 1949 the new ministry with Shri T.K. Narayan Pillai as Chief Minister took office. On 26 January 1952 the Indian Republican constitution came into effect, leading to the reconstitution of legislative and parliamentary constituencies in Travancore-Cochin. In March 1952, general elections for the newly constituted legislative assembly took place, and Prof. K.M. Chandy contested and was elected. The Shri A.J. John ministry resigned on 23 September 1953, necessitating new general elections. In 1954, new general elections were held, and Prof. Chandy contested from Meenachil constituency, winning with a comfortable majority of 6154 votes. He became the Chief Whip of the Congress parliamentary party.

On 1 November 1956 the Kerala state was established. In March 1957, Legislative Assembly election were held for the state assembly. Party asked Prof. Chandy to contest from Puliyannoor constituency. His detractors had taken it as an opportunity to defeat him. The big land owners and religious group had believed that the rise of Prof. Chandy would affect their feudal hegemony over the public. They all joined with the single agenda of defeating the progressive youth politician Prof. Chandy. The success of Prof. Chandy in this area actually surprised them. Despite their concerted efforts, Prof. Chandy's surprising popularity in the area led to a closely contested election, which he lost by a margin of merely 600 votes.

== Significant Contributions to Meenachil Taluk(Pala) and Social Advocacy ==
Continuing his efforts for the welfare of Meenachil taluk, Prof. Chandy played a pivotal role in upgrading the current Pala government hospital to a Taluk hospital with enhanced facilities, including Civil surgeon, Assistant surgeons and gynecologist. New facilities including pay wards had been built and X-ray imaging facility had been created in the hospital. One of Prof. Chandy's greatest accomplishments as an M.L.A was constructing a bridge over the Meenachil River, which significantly improved connectivity between north and south region for the Pala town's residents. The major part of Pala town's town had remained flooded during monsoon season. The town roads were raised to mitigate flooding.

Additionally, Prof. Chandy, along with Cherian J. Kappan, initiated several aided high schools in Meenachil taluk. He also facilitated the electrification of most parts of Meenachil taluk, thereby boosting its agricultural and commercial activities. The Pala market had been developed during his tenure. Shri K.M. Chandy was responsible for obtaining sanction and permission for starting Pala St.Thomas College.

His imprint extended beyond legislative duties to encompass membership in the inaugural State Planning Board. Additionally, he played a prominent part in the State Minimum Wages Advisory Board, where he contributed to the formulation of equitable minimum wage standards across diverse industries. Long before the Indian National Trade Union Congress (INTUC) was established, Chandy's pioneering efforts led to the organization and leadership of Trade Unions under the banner of "THOZHILALI".

== Influence on Kerala Pradesh Congress Committee (KPCC) ==
Chandy's commitment to the Congress Party was profound and enduring. His influence within the Kerala Pradesh Congress Committee (KPCC) was instrumental in shaping the party's trajectory in the state. He embarked on a journey within the ranks of the KPCC in 1948, a journey that spanned decades and left an indelible mark on the party's history.

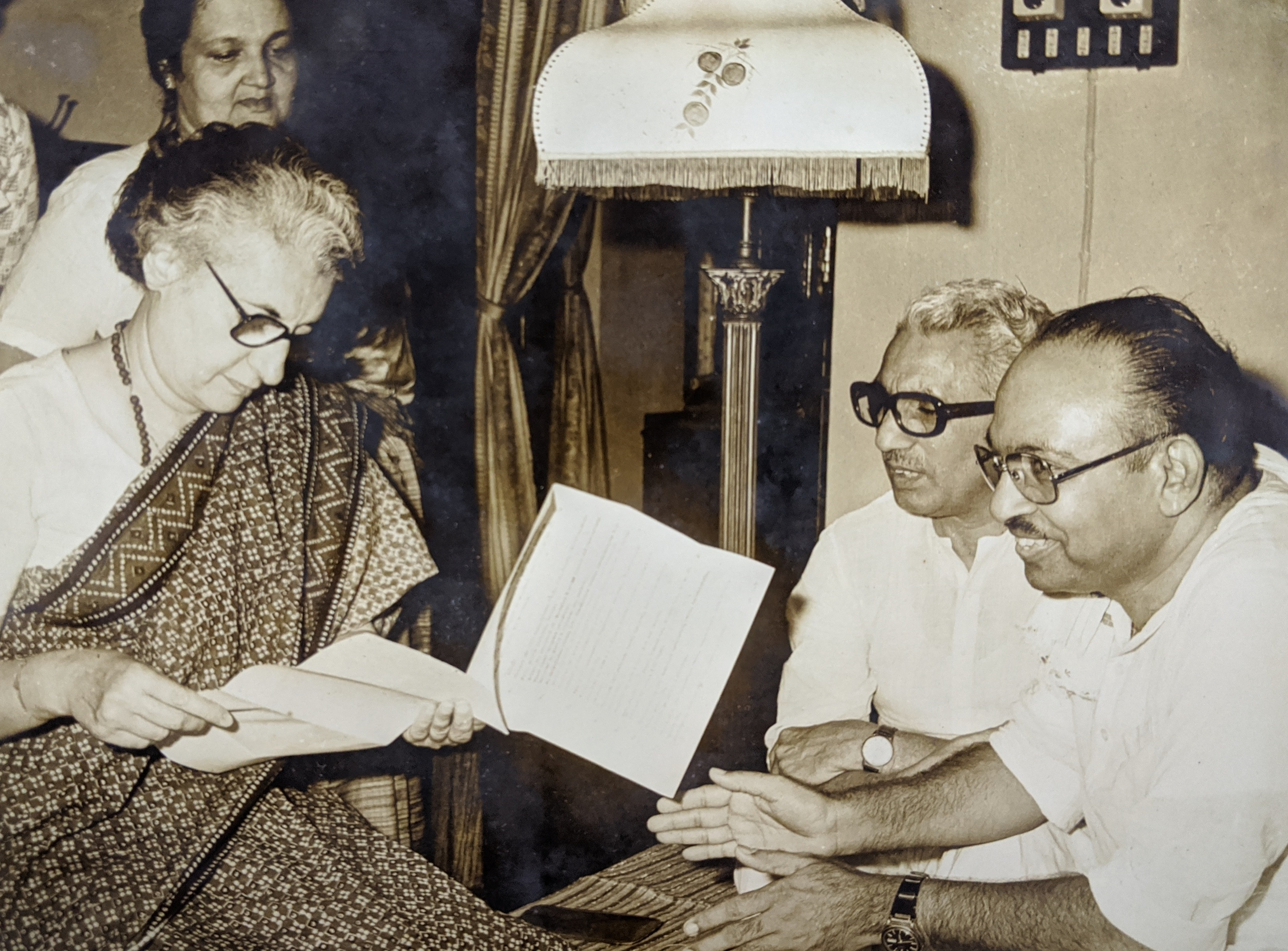
Prof.K.M.Chandy along with K. Karunakaran having a conversation with Indira Gandhi

He assumed the mantle of General Secretary of the KPCC from 1963 to 1967, a period marked by his strategic vision and organizational acumen. Chandy's leadership was characterized by a commitment to democratic processes within the party, even in times when committee sizes were far more modest than they are today. He played a pivotal role in guiding the KPCC through challenges and charting a course aligned with the party's principles.

Chandy's dedication extended to financial stewardship as he assumed the role of Treasurer of the KPCC from 1967 to 1972. His ability to manage party finances with transparency and integrity bolstered the party's credibility among its supporters and the public at large.

== Reviving Congress in Kerala ==
In January 1978, Chandy resigned from the Chairmanship of the Rubber Board to take up the challenge of revitalizing the image of the Congress Party in Kerala. At a time when many had distanced themselves from Indira Gandhi's leadership, Chandy undertook the task of rejuvenating the party's fortunes. His leadership played a pivotal role in the resurgence of the Congress in Kerala after a prolonged hiatus.

Under his stewardship, the Congress triumphantly returned to power in Kerala, marking a significant victory for the party. This resurgence was a testament to Chandy's strategic prowess, organizational skills, and deep-rooted connection with the people of Kerala.

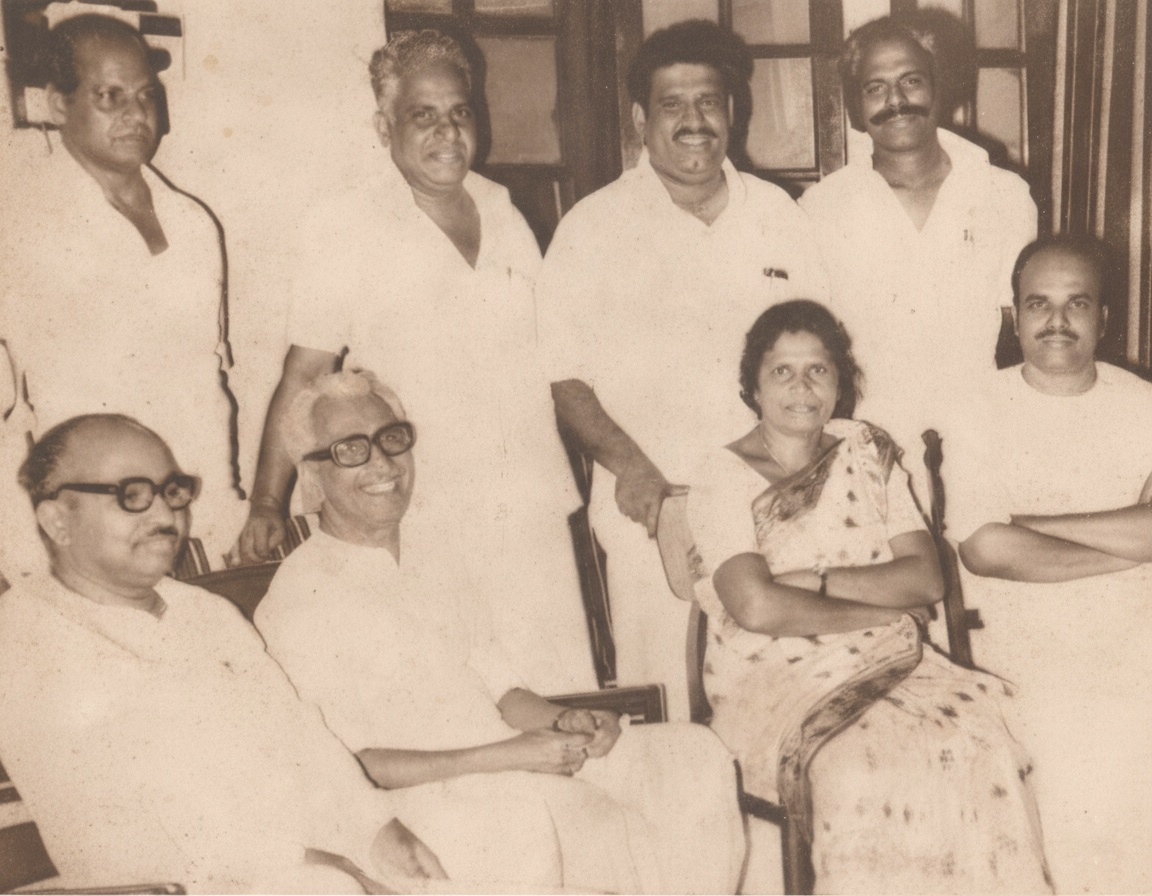
Prof.K.M.Chandy with leaders of Kerala including K. Karunakaran

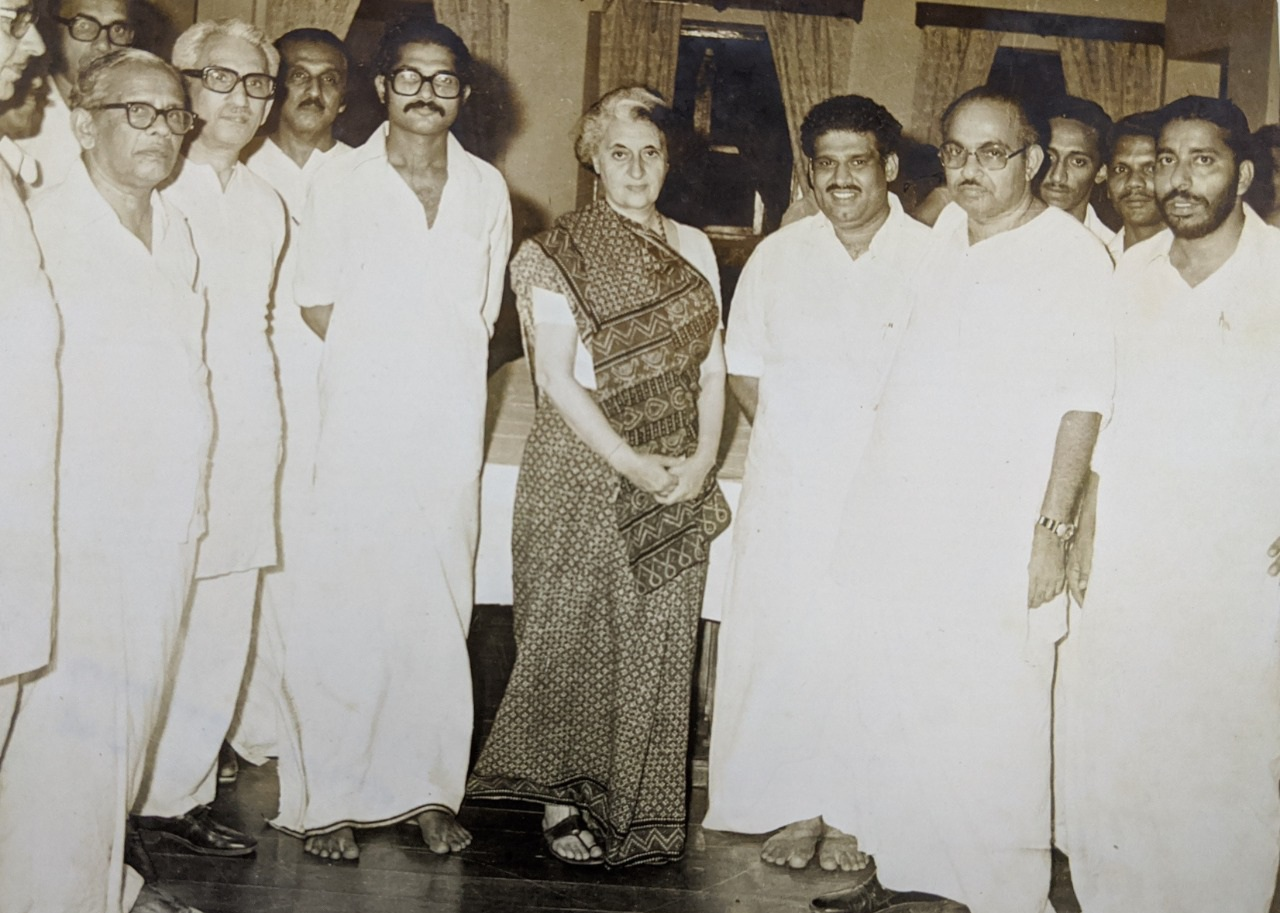
Prof.K.M.Chandy with Indira Gandhi and Kerala Leaders

== Indira Gandhi's Vision and Trust ==
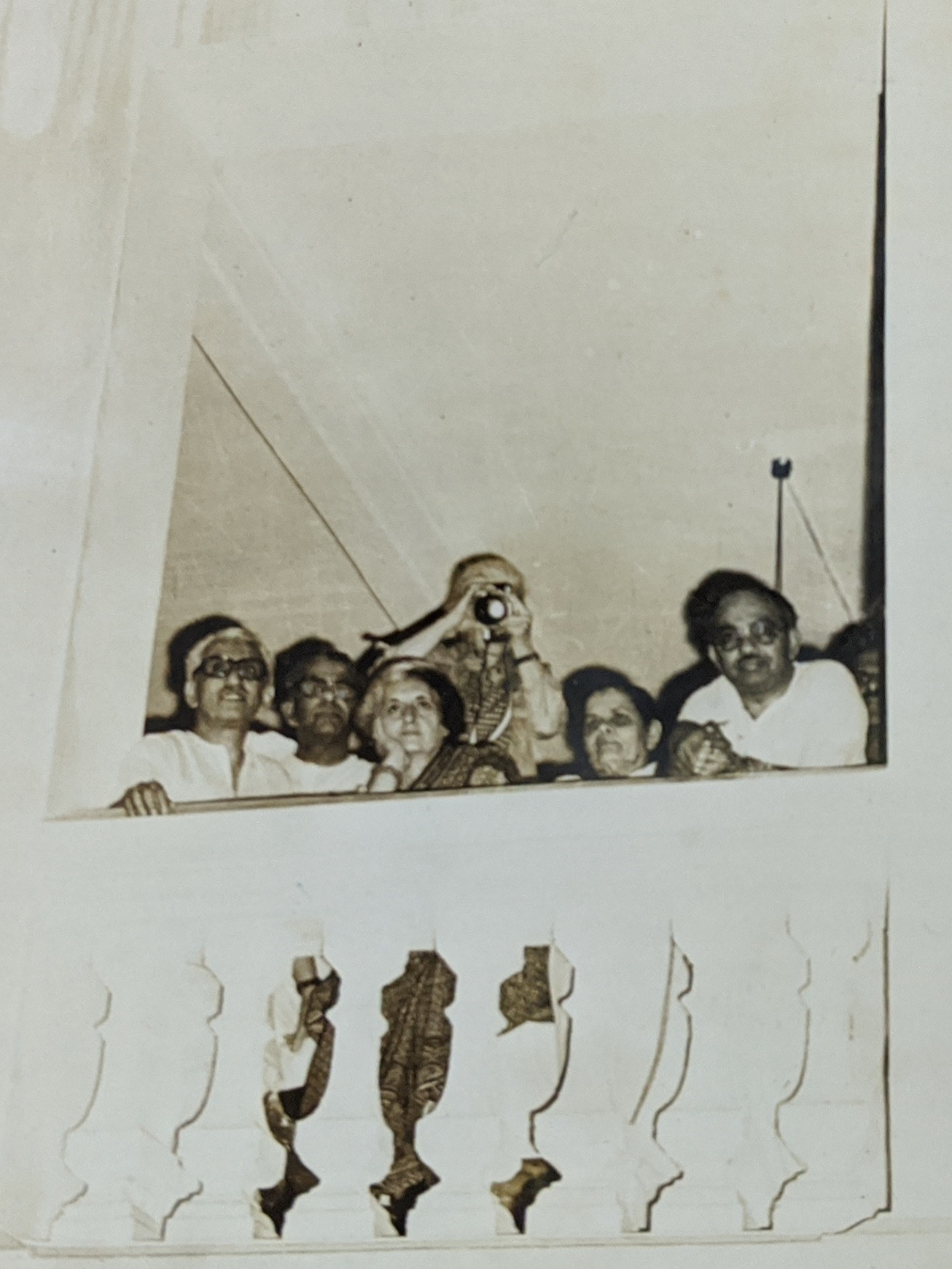
Prof.K.M.Chandy is with Indira Gandhi

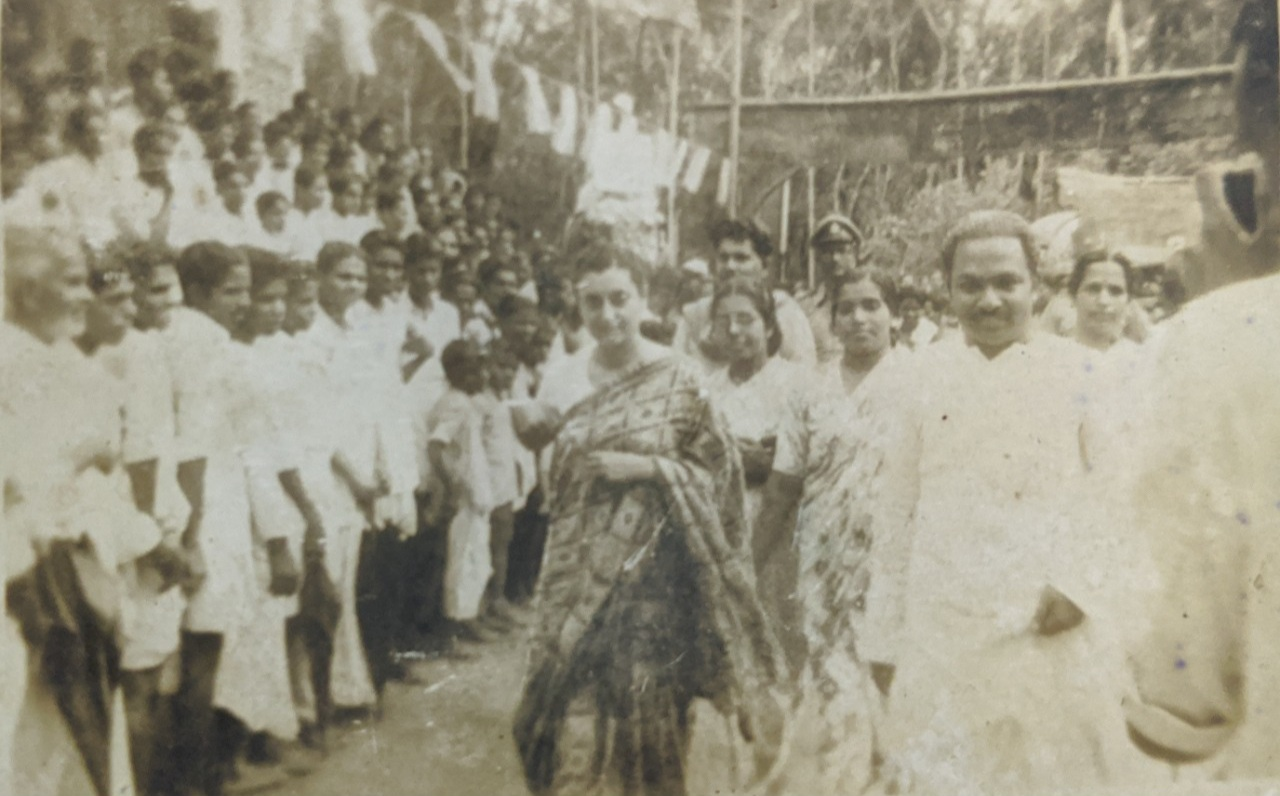
Indira Gandhi attending a procession with Prof.K.M.Chandy during her visit in Kerala

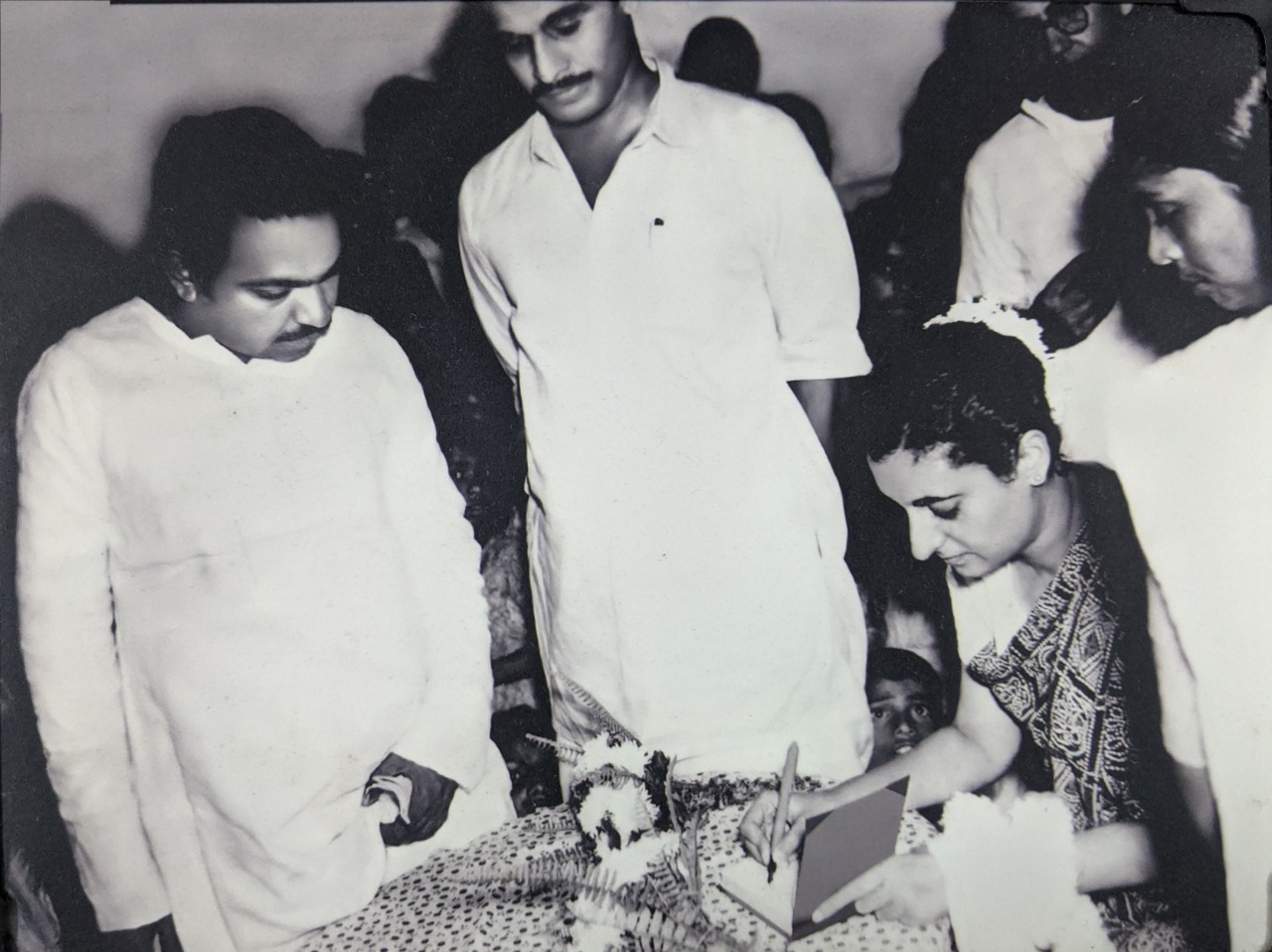
Prof.K.M.Chandy with Indira gandhi when she visited Kerala

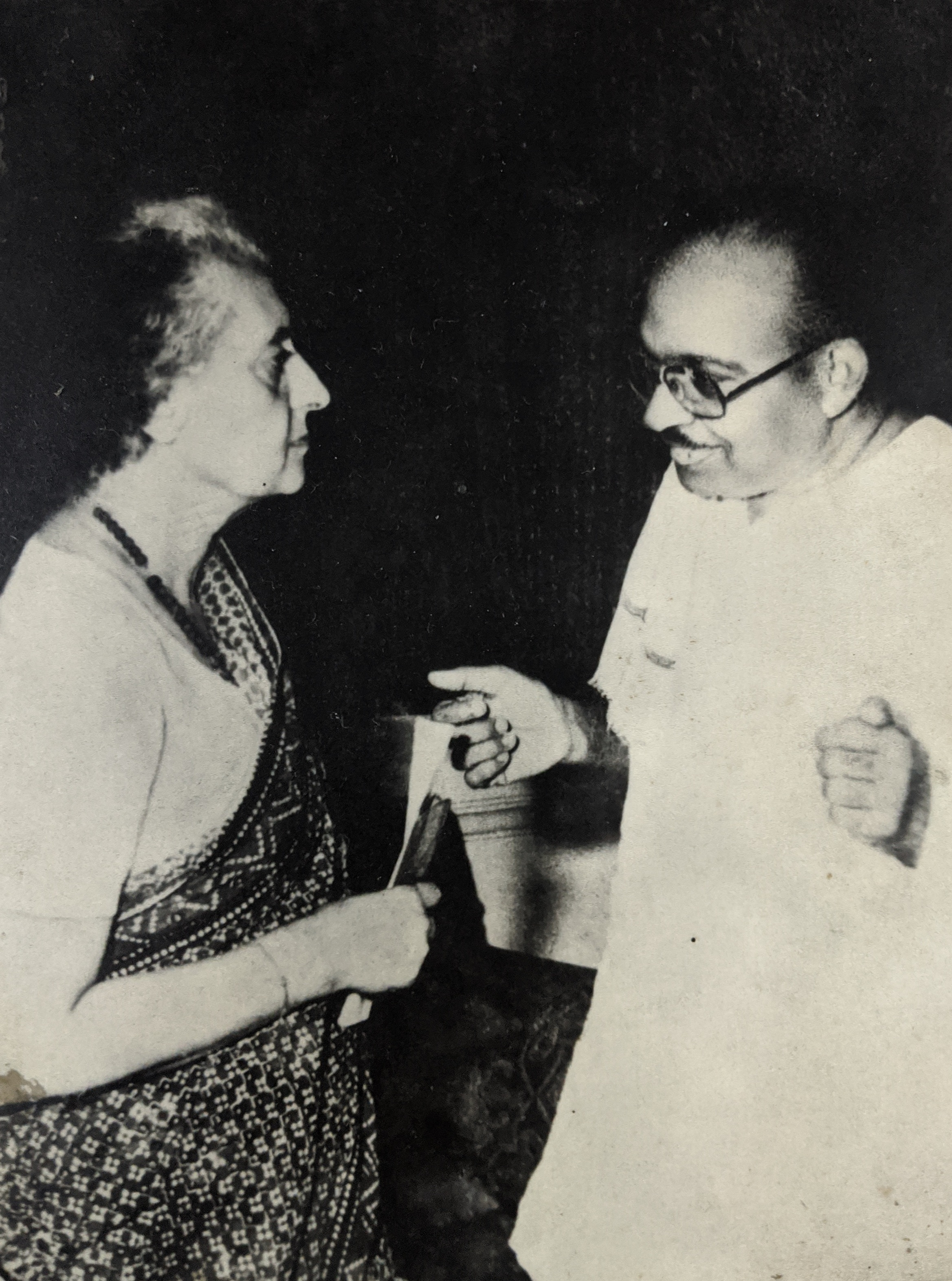
Prof.K.M.Chandy and Indira Gandhi having a conversation

Throughout his tenure as a governor, Chandy remained true to his principles of transparency, accountability, and service. His ability to align his governance with the ideals of progress and social justice resonated deeply with Mrs. Indira Gandhi's own vision for India. It was this alignment that led her to entrust him with these important responsibilities.

== A Statesman's Path and the Role of Governor ==
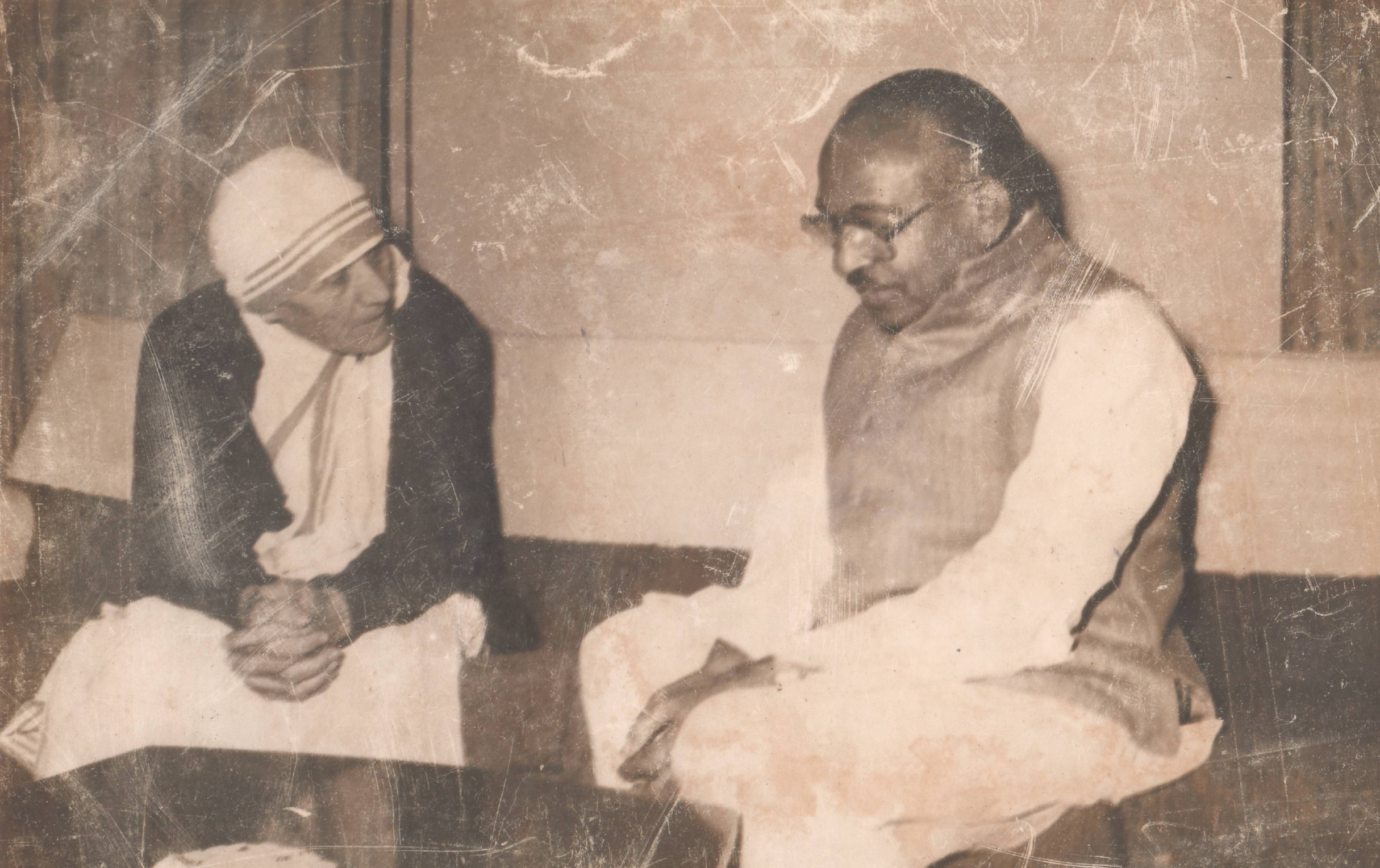
Prof.K.M.Chandy in Conversation with Mother Teresa

Chandy's journey within the Congress Party culminated in a role as a statesman. He was appointed as a governor by Indira Gandhi, the Prime Minister of India.

=== Pondicherry: Navigating a Unique Territory ===
Taking on the role of Lieutenant Governor of Pondicherry on 15 May 1982, Chandy stepped into the challenge of overseeing this Union Territory. He navigated the intricate landscape of governance, addressing the specific needs of Pondicherry's populace and working towards the upliftment of the region.

=== Gujarat: Guiding a Vibrant State ===
On 6 August 1983 Chandy assumed the mantle of Governor of Gujarat. This role placed him at the helm of a dynamic and industrially significant state. During his tenure, he exhibited a keen understanding of Gujarat's diverse socio-economic fabric and guided the state towards progress and harmony.

=== Madhya Pradesh: Championing Reform ===
From 15 May 1984 to 30 March 1989, Chandy served as the Governor of Madhya Pradesh. Here, he embarked on a transformative journey to reform and rectify the educational system. His commitment to eliminating corrupt practices and ensuring the integrity of university examinations left an indelible mark on the state's academic landscape.

== Death ==
On 7 September 1998 Prof. K.M Chandy passed away, leaving behind a legacy that encompasses his contributions to co-operatives, education, politics, and his roles as a governor. His life story, his contributions had an impact throughout Kerala and beyond.

== Biographies ==
He couldn't complete his autobiography titled "Jeevitha Vazhiyorakazhchakal" due to his sudden death, but later it was published by Labour (India) publications in 1999 after his death.

A biography on him titled "Varika Varika Sahajare" was written by Pala K.M. Mathew published by Current Books in 2009.
