= T. M. Varghese =

Indian politician

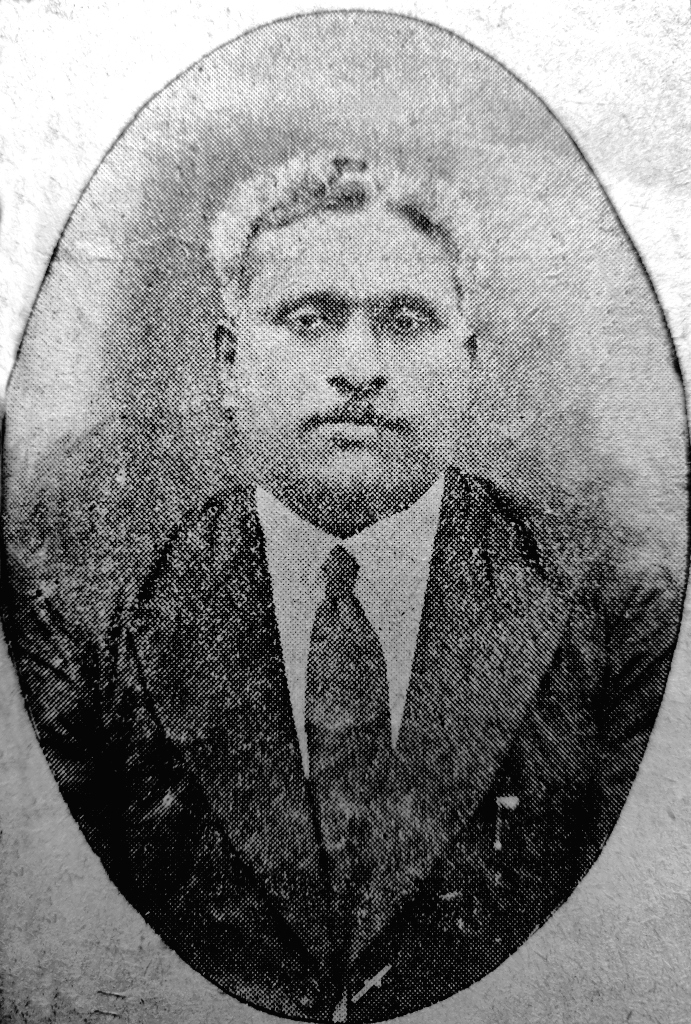
- Born: 1886
- Died: 31 December 1961 (aged 74–75)

Thandaaneth Mathai Varghese (1886–1961) was an Indian freedom fighter, lawyer, statesman, former minister and politician from Kerala.

He was born in a Mar Thoma Syrian Christian family and the eldest son of Mathai of Thandaaneth at Pallickal, (near Kayamkulam). His education was at Mavelikkara and Thiruvananthapuram. After graduating from the Law College, he began practicing at Kollam.

There he actively started political activities. He was the foremost leader of the (Responsible government Struggle) struggle against C. P. Ramaswamy Iyer, the Dewan of Travancore State and Abstention movement or Nivarthana Prakshobham.

== Family life ==
At the age of 16 he married from Mavelikkara. His bride was only 9 years old. T. M. Varghese had 11 children. T.M. Varghese's education was paid for by his paternal uncle P.K. John, a very wealthy prominent lawyer of his time. The family bought a piece of land near Kammankulam near Government Boys High School, Kollam. The lake near this land has interesting connections with Kallumala Samaram.

== Political career ==
He was the founder member of the Travancore State Congress party. He was a prominent figure in struggles towards democratization of Travancore.

=== Abstention Movement. ===
Soon after Sir C. P. Ramaswami Iyer popularly known as Sir C.P. was appointed as Dewan of Travancore, he appointed non native, Tamil Brahmin to all the top posts of Government. Against this the Nairs joined and agitated. This is known as the “Malayali Memorial Agitation.” As a result of this, Maharaja of Travancore Chithira Thirunal Balarama Varma issued a proclamation on 21 October 1932 to constitute a new State Assembly. This came into effect on 1 January 1933. As per this order, the seats were divided among the community as given below:

Community	Population	Seats
Christians	1,60,400	10
Ezhavas	89,900	3
Nairs	86,800	36
Other Hindus	47,900	15
Muslims	35,300	3
Lower castes	91,700	1
Europeans	578	2

Total population 5,090,000 and the total seats in the Assembly 70.

Christians, Ezhavas and Muslims who were contributing to economy significantly and were demographically prominent were grossly underrepresented in terms of assembly seats. So under the leadership of T.M. Varghese representatives of Christians, Ezhava and Muslim communities met the Diwan. The meeting didn't yield any results. T.M. Varghese realized that a government with no responsibility to the people was an anachronism. A meeting of the leaders of the three communities, including C Kesavan, was called at the L.M.S. hall, Thiruvananthapuram, on 25 January 1933. They decided to stay united under T.M. Varghese and abstain from the elections. This is known as Nivarthana Prakshobhanam (Abstention Movement).

=== Joint Political Party. ===
The Christians of Travancore met together at Thiruvananthapuram on 21 November 1932 and formed All Kerala Christian Union (Kerala Kristava Maha Sabha). A general meeting of this Union was held at Kozhencherry from 9 to 11 May 1935.

On the first day, T.M. Varghese proposed a resolution that “The election of the Travancore Legislative Assembly is not justifiable, the government officers have made unlawful influence in its formation, and it is against the wishes of Christian-Ezhava- Muslim people, it is requested that the government should immediately disband the present assembly and elect a new one.”

On the last day there was a meeting of All Kerala Joint Political Meeting. C. Kesavan one of the speakers said, “I am talking about C.P. (C. P. Ramaswami Iyer). We don't require this pest. Travancore got a bad name after his arrival. This country will be gone to the dogs unless this man leaves.” (this is now known as C. Kesavan's Kozhencherry Address). This angered the Diwan Sir C.P. and C. Kesavan was arrested on 7 June 1935 and was sentenced to two years jail. Three lawyers T.M. Varghese, K.T.Thomas and Barrister George Joseph appeared for C.Kesavan.

All Kerala Joint Political Party (Samuktha Party) was formed and elected T.M. Varghese as Chairman and K.T.Thomas as Secretary. Because of all these, the government at last conceded their demands to a certain extent by introducing communal reservation in appointments to the public service. In August 1936 a new constitution was promulgated and election for the Travancore State Assembly was held on April–May, 1937. T.M. Varghese won the election as a candidate of the All Kerala Joint Political Party. In the Sree Moolam Popular Assembly he was elected as Deputy Chairman.

C. Kesavan who was put in jail in 1935 was released in 1937. Welcoming Kesavan at Kollam and Alapuzha, T.M. Varghese said, “In the name of and on behalf of the 5.1 lakhs (5,10,000) of people of Travancore, I accord with pleasure, a hearty welcome to the most-self sacrificing individual C. Kesavan." Diwan was furious. As per his suggestion, a no confidence motion was moved against the Deputy speaker. In the voting that followed 42 supported the motion, 24 were against and 2 abstained. Thus, T.M. Varghese was removed from his post as deputy speaker.

=== State Congress. ===
In February 1938, T.M. Varghese tabled a motion to discuss the point “Responsible Government,” (Utharavaditha Bharanam - Government responsible to the people). Sir C.P. allowed this motion to be discussed. In the Assembly, T.M. Varghese declared. “There is no need of a Diwan, in between the 5.1 million people of Travancore and their Maharaja.” Pattom Thanu Pillai and K.T. Thomas spoke supporting the motion. On that day after coming out of the Assembly hall, they formed the Travancore State Congress.

Arrests followed. Banks and newspapers were closed. Agitation spread. In 1938, a number of leaders and newspaper editors were assaulted. There was no enquiry on this. For discussion, T.M. Varghese brought a resolution in the Assembly but Sir C.P. did not accept it.

Finally on 30 July 1947 Travancore decided to join Indian Union. On 15 August, India attained freedom. On 19, Sir C.P. resigned. The government issued a proclamation on 4 September 1947 stating the formation of a “Responsible Government.”

== Arts ==
He was instrumental in helping Kunchacko set up Udaya Pictures, the first prominent Kerala based film production company. He provided legal assistance to set up the company and also became a shareholder in it.

== Death and memorials ==
He died on 31 December 1961. The body was cremated at a Marthoma Church in Kollam.

There is a park constructed in Kollam in memory of him and is maintained by Kollam Municipal Corporation. There is also a library in his name maintained by municipality situated near Ammachiveedu.

== See also ==
- C. Kesavan
- Kumbalathu Sanku Pillai
