= R. Sankar =

Chief minister of Kerala, India (1909–1972)

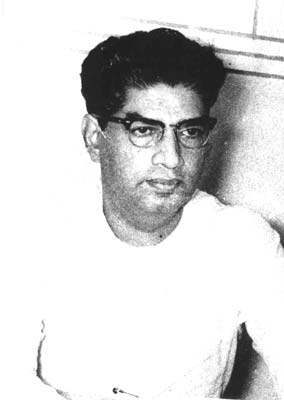

3rd Chief Minister of Kerala
- In office 26 September 1962 – 10 September 1964
- Preceded by: Pattom A. Thanu Pillai
- Succeeded by: E. M. S. Namboodiripad

1st Deputy Chief Minister of Kerala
- In office 22 February 1960 – 26 September 1962
- Chief Minister: Pattom Thanu Pillai
- Preceded by: Office Established
- Succeeded by: C. H. Mohammed Koya (1981)

Personal details
- Born: 30 April 1909 Kuzhikkalidavaka, Kingdom of Travancore, British India (present-day Kerala, India)
- Died: 6 November 1972 (aged 63) Kollam, Kerala, India
- Party: Indian National Congress
- Spouse: Lakshmikuttyamma
- Children: 2
- Parents: Raman Panicker; Kunchaliamma

Raman Sankar (30 April 1909 – 7 November 1972) was an Indian politician, statesman, administrator, orator, educationist, writer and editor who served as the 3rd Chief Minister of Kerala from 1962 to 1964.

== Personal life ==
He was born to Raman Panicker and Kunchaliamma on 30 April 1909 in Kuzhikkalidavaka village in Puthoor, Kollam district. He did his formal education in the Puthoor Primary School and later continued in an English School in Kottarakkara. In 1924 he joined Maharajas College and graduated with a degree in Chemistry and did law from Government Law College, Thiruvananthapuram in 1933.

He had four siblings and was married to Lekshmikutti Amma and had two children Mohan Sankar and a daughter.

Sankar died at the age of 63 on 7 November 1972.

== Public Life ==
He started his professional life as a teacher and then became the principal of Sivagiri High School in 1931. During this period he became closely associated with Sree Narayana Dharma Paripalana Yogam. In 1932 he became active in political space by being part of Nivarthana Agitation or Abstention movement. In 1936 he started practicing in Kollam Court as an advocate and was drawn to freedom movement and became an active member of the Travancore State Congress by 1938.

Later, he took a break from the Congress party and began to work in the SNDP Yogam. During his long association with the SNDP Yogam of over 13 years, he served as its General Secretary for over a span of 10 years and President and Chief of the SN Trust. In 1944 he became the general secretary of SNDP. Under his leadership the SNDP Yogam gave emphasis to the field of education and started many educational institutions. In the year 1952 he established SN Trust to manage educational institutions across the state. SNDP Yogam celebrated its Golden Jubilee year while Sankar was the General Secretary in 1953. As part of a year-long celebration he organised an Exhibition in Kollam which is marked in the history of the State as 'SNDP Kanaka Jubilee'. In 1957 he quit as general secretary and became associated with SN Trust.

Sankar returned to the Congress and was elected to the Travancore-Cochin State Assembly in 1948 and stayed as a member of the State Assembly from 1949 to 1952. Sankar was a member of the Constituent Assembly and also member of the Franchise and Delimitation Commission and the Reforms Committee constituted after the introduction of the Responsible Government. In this period he lost two elections to 1952 Travancore-Cochin Legislative Assembly election from Kottarakkara and 1954 Travancore-Cochin Legislative Assembly election from Kollam. In 1949 Sankar along with Mannathu Padmanabha Pillai was outsted from Congress briefly and they attempted creating a Ezhava Nair unified platform named Hindu Maha Mandalam.

Thereafter he led the Congress party as Kerala Pradesh Congress Committee (KPCC) President during the Vimochana Samaram (Liberation Struggle) in 1959. The Congress won the elections in 1960 under R. Sankar's leadership and Sankar won as an MLA from Kannur. Though Congress gained majority of seats in the Elections of 1960 to the Kerala Legislative Assembly, Pattom Thanupillai of the Praja Socialist Party was given the Chief Ministership (CM) and Sankar became the Deputy Chief Minister in the Pattom Thanupillai ministry. He handled the portfolio of Finance from 1960 to 1962 when he was the Deputy CM.

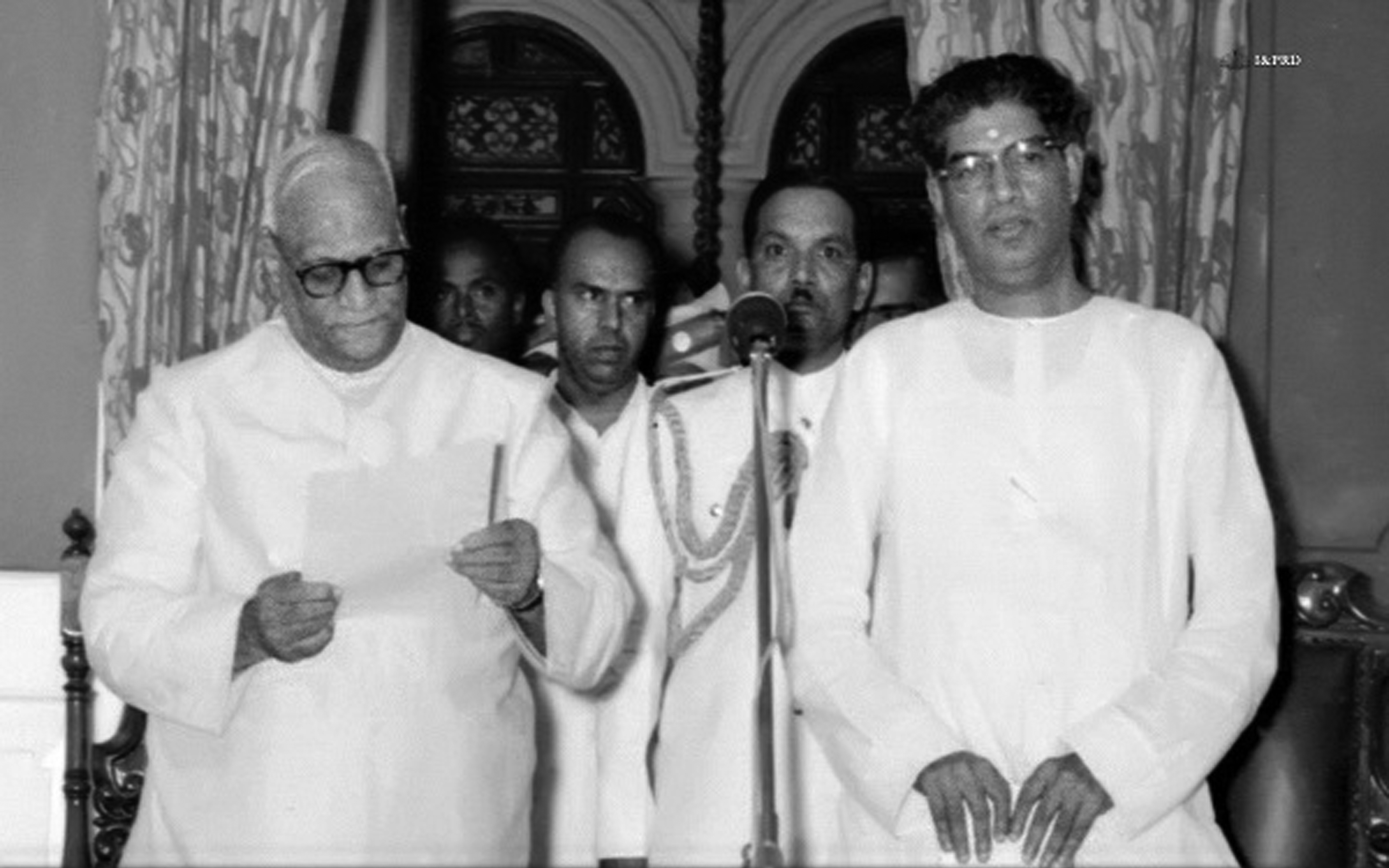
R. Sankar swearing in Chief Minister of Kerala in 1962

R. Sankar became the Chief Minister of Kerala when Pattom Thanupillai was appointed Governor of Punjab State. He was in the chair from 26 September 1962 to 10 September 1964. He had to resign and dismiss the Government under his leadership when a Motion of no confidence was passed in the Assembly following death of P. T. Chacko and chain of events that led to formation of Kerala Congress.

He lost the 1965 Kerala Legislative Assembly election from Attingal constituency and 1967 Indian general election from Chirayinkil (Lok Sabha constituency) and thereafter following consecutive political and electoral setbacks and Ezhava community moving closer to Communism he stepped back from active politics and concentrated in starting and implementing Educational Institutions for SNDP Yogam by settling back in Kollam.

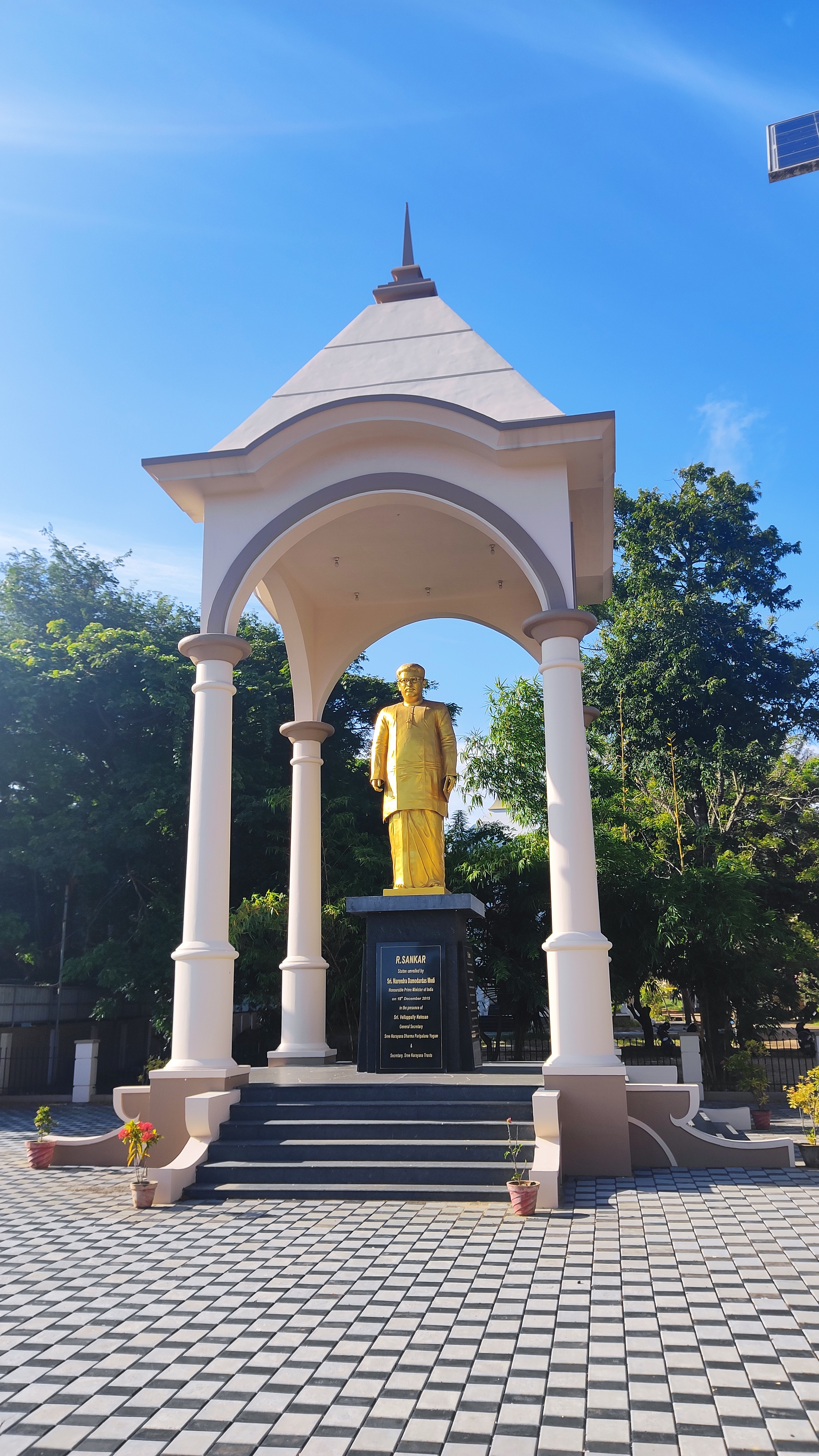
R Shankar statue SN College Kollam

=== Contributions in Public career ===
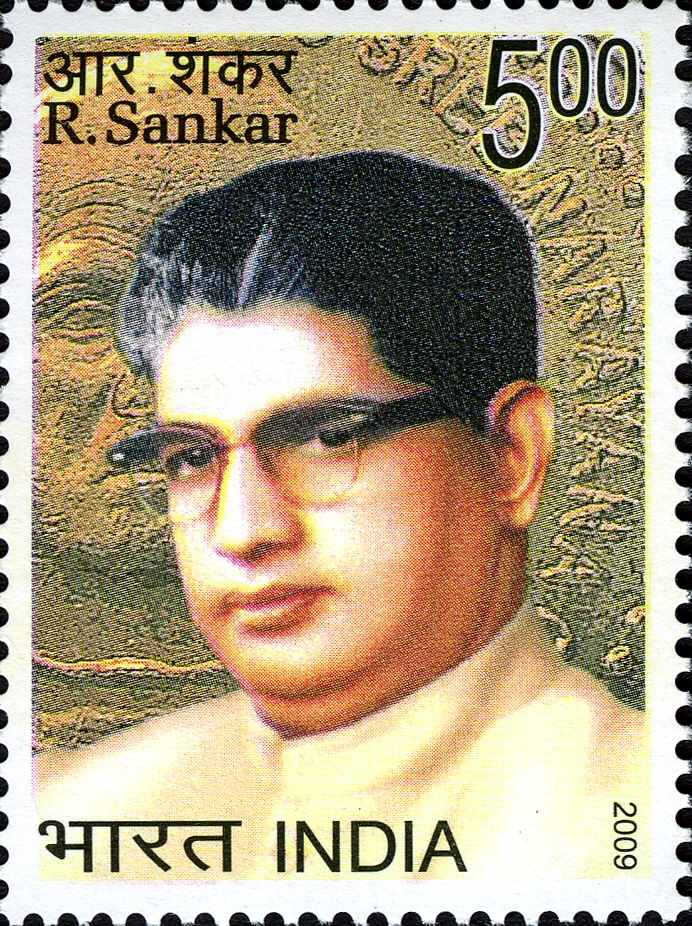
R Sankar 2009 stamp of India

He was the second person from backward communities who rose up to Chief minister from Travancore–Cochin (after C. Kesavan) and first from Kerala. He brought about many economic reforms while handling the finance portfolio despite facing legislative and societal pressures and political instabilities. He was a visionary who helped Ezhava community attain empowerment and Social mobility through education. He served as the Chairman of the Committee of Privileges from 1960 to 1964.

Sankar ministry was instrumental in constituting Justice Kumara Pillai Commission for setting up Other Backward Class reservations in Kerala during 1964-65 following a Kerala High Court verdict. He introduced pensions for Widow and Old age in the state.

After retiring from politics he started the Sree Narayana Medical Mission under the SN Trust for giving away free treatment. The first hospital under the mission was started in Kollam, the hospital is also known on his name 'Sankars Hospital' which is now a multispecialty hospital. The body of Sankar was also laid to rest in the Hospital compound as a tribute to his service.

He was the president of the committee that erected the statue of poet Kumaranasan in Thiruvananthapuram and has also served as editor of a Malayalam daily, Dinamony.

== See also ==
- Janardhana Poojary
- Vellappally Natesan

Preceded by Pattom Thanupillai	Chief Minister of Kerala; 1962– 1964	Succeeded by E. M. S. Namboodiripad
