= Kumbalathu Sanku Pillai =

Social reformer, politician and freedom fighter

President, Kerala Pradesh Congress Committee
- In office 1949–1951
- Preceded by: K. T. Kunhiraman Nambiar
- Succeeded by: R. Sankar

Personal details
- Born: 15 February 1898 Prakkulam, Quilon, Kingdom of Travancore (present day Kollam, Kerala, India)
- Died: 16 April 1969 (aged 71) Panmana, Kollam, Kerala, India
- Party: Indian National Congress

Kumbalathu Sanku Pillai (1898-1969) was a social reformer, politician and freedom fighter from Kollam in erstwhile Travancore. An upper caste by birth, who worked for upliftment of lower Caste, spreading modern education and democratization of Travancore. He was the president of Kerala Pradesh Congress Committee from 1949-1951 and one of the leaders of Vimochana Samaram. He was also the founder and first president of Panmana Ashramam made in commemoration of Chattampi Swamikal.

== Life ==
Sanku Pillai was born at Prakkulam, Kollam in a Nair landlord family named Thottuvayalil Bungalow on 15 February 1898 and after his childhood he moved to Panmana. He undertook various social reform activities like organizing inter-caste-dining and facilitating temple entry for back ward castes at two temples near Panmana even before the Temple Entry Proclamation of 1936. He was a disciple of Chattampi Swamikal and invited the saint to Panmana in his late years of life. After Chattampi Swamikal died, by 1938 Pillai established the Panmana Ashramam to propagate teachings of Swamikal.

The relationship with Barrister A.K. Pillai brought Sanku Pillai into politics. He participated in struggles for responsible government in Travancore. In the end of 1940's he was in forefront of protests against Pattom Thanu Pillai by Indian National Congress members. In this period he rose up in ranks to the president of Kerala Pradesh Congress Committee. Sanku Pillai was also part of the Vimochana Samaram.

He was also the founder of Devaswom board College, Sasthamkotta.

== Popular art ==
The autobiography of Sanku Pillai is Ente Kazhinjakaala Smaranakal.

== See also ==
- C. Kesavan
