= Rubber Plantation Certification Scheme =

The Rubber Plantation Certification Scheme is a scheme run by the Rubber Board, a statutory body under the Ministry of Commerce and Industry, Government of India, for granting certificates to the owners of rubber plantations showing all details of the rubber plantation. Certification of rubber plantations is a voluntary certification procedure launched by The Rubber Board in 2014.

== Background ==
As per the section 10 of the Rubber Act, 1947 registration of rubber plantations was mandatory. However the Board discontinued the practice of registration in 1986 though the act was amended to that effect only by the Rubber Amendment Act 2009. With the discontinuation of mandatory registration, the Board resorted to structured statistical random sampling for collection of data on production, productivity, mature and immature areas, clones planted and other factors. The accuracy of data collected through random sampling has been challenged by farmers and consumers of rubber; as a result, they demanded the reintroduction of registration. The Board resolved to approach the government for reintroduction of mandatory registration. Meanwhile, optional certification of rubber plantations was launched in 2014.

In March 2025, the Rubber Board has started geo mapping in Kerala, a key step in certification of natural rubber under the Indian Sustainable Natural Rubber (iSNR) framework. A Rubber Plantation Development and Extension Scheme was also launched in 2018.

== Fee for certification ==
Area	Fee in Rs	GST in Rs	Total in Rs
Up to 0.50 hectares	100	18	118
0.50 - 1.00 hectares	200	36	236
1.00 - 10 hectares	500	90	590
More than 10 hectares	1000	180	1180
