= Governor John =

Governor John may refer to:

- A. J. John (1893–1957), Governor of Madras State from 1956 to 1957
- Adrian Johns (born 1951), Governor of Gibraltar from 2009 to 2013
- John St. John (1833–1916), Governor of Kansas from 1879 to 1883
