= Panampilly Govinda Menon =

Indian politician (1906–1970)

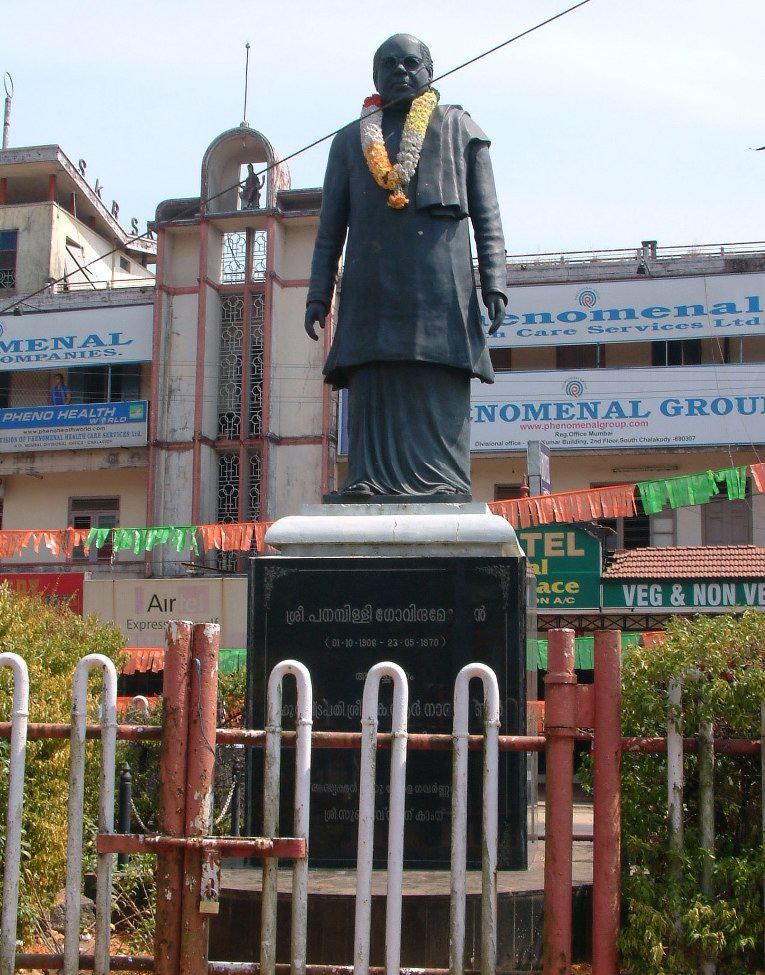

Union Minister for Railways
- In office 4 November 1969 – 18 February 1970
- Prime Minister: Indira Gandhi
- Preceded by: Ram Subhag Singh
- Succeeded by: Gulzarilal Nanda

Member of Parliament for Mukundapuram
- In office 1962–1970
- Preceded by: Narayankutty Menon
- Succeeded by: A. C. George

5th Chief Minister of Travancore-Cochin
- In office 10 February 1955 – 23 March 1956
- Preceded by: Pattom Thanu Pillai
- Succeeded by: President's rule

1st Prime Minister of Cochin
- In office 14 August 1947 – 22 October 1947
- Monarch: Kerala Varna VII
- Preceded by: Office established
- Succeeded by: T. K. Nair

Personal details
- Born: 1 October 1906 Chalakudy, Kingdom of Cochin, British India
- Died: 23 May 1970 (aged 63)
- Party: Indian National Congress
- Education: St Joseph's College, Tiruchirappalli, Madras Law College

Panampilly Govinda Menon (1 October 1906 – 23 May 1970) was an Indian lawyer, independence activist and statesman. Govinda Menon served as the Prime Minister of Cochin, Chief Minister of Travancore-Cochin, member of the Constituent Assembly of India, Minister of State for Food and Agriculture, Union Minister for Law and Railways and President of the Nair Service Society.

He was born in a village near Kathikkudam and graduated from St. Thomas College, Thrissur. He started his legal practice as a junior to Adv. M. C. Joseph. He was the first treasurer of Kerala Yukthivadi Sangham. He moved his practice to Ernakulam afterwards.

Later in the 1930s he became prominent in the politics of the Kingdom of Cochin and served briefly as the Prime Minister of Cochin state in 1947. After the union of Travancore and Cochin, he served as minister for education under Parur T. K. Narayana Pillai and minister for finance under A. J. John, Anaparambil. He was the Chief Minister of Travancore-Cochin in 1955–1956. He represented Mukundapuram (Lok Sabha constituency) from 1962 until his death. He became Union Minister for Law and Railways (1969–1970) and Minister of state for Food and Agriculture. He was also the political mentor of K. Karunakaran.

In 2006, the birth centenary celebrations of Panampilly Govinda Menon were inaugurated by the then President of India, A. P. J. Abdul Kalam. Later in his memory a college was built in Chalakudy named Panampilly Memorial Government College.

== Early life ==
Govinda Menon was born on 1 October 1906, in the village of Kakkad which is on the eastern bank of the Chalakudy River, in the district of Thrissur in Kerala, India. He was the fourth son of Kumarapilly Krishna Menon and Madhavi Amma. He grew-up under the wings of his uncle Kunjunni Menon.

== Education ==
Govinda Menon studied at the Paliyam School from Second Standard to the Seventh Standard. He then moved to the Maharajas School in Eranakulam. During this time he was staying with his elder sister Janaki Amma and her husband Madhava Menon who was a lawyer. During this time, he got attracted to the Indian freedom movement and this did not go well with the school authorities. He moved to Chalakudy high school as a result.

When Rabindranath Tagore the famous poet visited Kerala, and was going to attend a public event at Aluva, via Chalakudy, Govinda Menon and his friends went to meet him. He was punished for this by the school authorities. As a student he also participated in the Vaikom Satyagraha.

While he was in school Govindan excelled in public speaking, and in literary events.

For his college education Govinda Menon joined the St Thomas College in Thrissur. During this time he got more engaged in the freedom movement and participated in multiple activities. He continued to excel in many fields and always came first in college level competitions in a range of activities such as English Oratory, Malayalam Oratory etc. He was a talking point among his teachers. After completing his intermediate from St Thomas College, he went to Tiruchirappalli St Joseph College for his BA (Honours) and then to Madras Law College for his Bachelor of Law degree.
