= Paravoor T. K. Narayana Pillai =

Indian independence activist and politician (1890–1971)

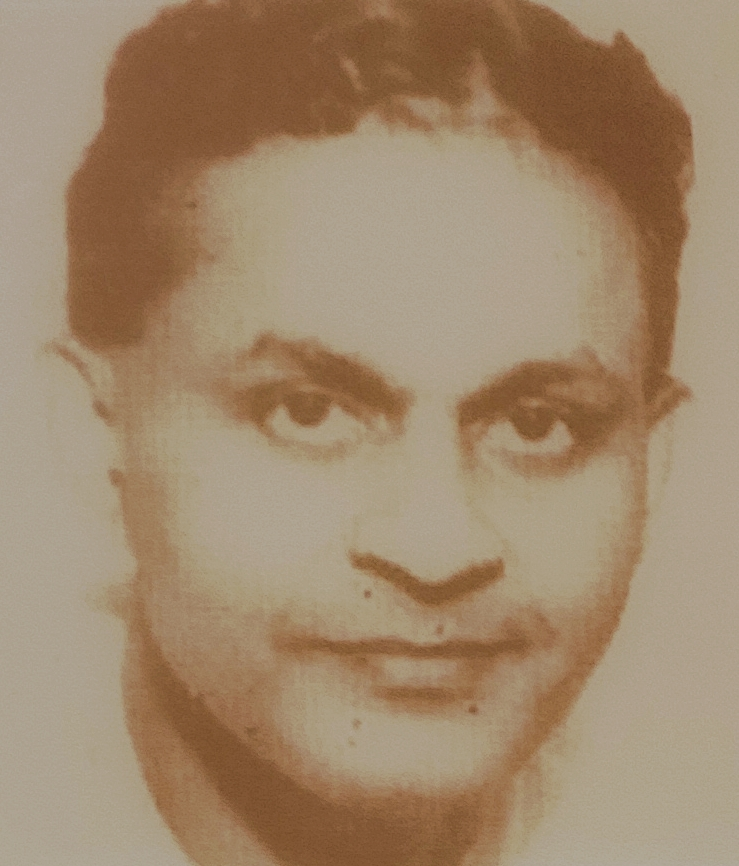

1st Chief Minister of Travancore-Cochin
- In office 1 July 1949 – 28 February 1951
- Governor: Chithira Thirunal Balarama Varma
- Preceded by: Office Established (Himself as Prime Minister of Travancore)
- Succeeded by: C. Kesavan

2nd Prime Minister of Travancore
- In office 22 October 1948 – 1 July 1949
- Monarch: Chithira Thirunal Balarama Varma
- Preceded by: Pattom Thanu Pillai
- Succeeded by: Office Abolished (Himself as Chief Minister of Travancore-Cochin)

Personal details
- Born: 25 March 1890 North Paroor, Travancore, British India
- Died: 23 June 1971 (aged 81)
- Party: Indian National Congress
- Relatives: Sujatha Mohan, Radhika Thilak (Granddaughters); Shweta Mohan (Great-Granddaughter)
- Education: Union Christian College, Aluva

Paravoor Thazhathuveettil Krishnan Narayana Pillai (25 March 1890 – 23 June 1971) was an Indian independence activist and politician from the Indian National Congress. He was the last Prime Minister of Travancore and the first Chief Minister of Travancore-Cochin at the time of its formation in 1949.

== Early life ==
Paravoor T. K. Narayana Pillai was born in North Paroor, in the princely state of Travancore, to a Nair family as the son of Thazhathuveettil Madhavi Amma and Cheranalloor Krishnan Kartha. Narayana Pillai belongs to the Thazhathuveettil family through matrilineal succession.

Narayana Pillai was educated at the Union Christian College in Alwaye, and earned his Bachelor of Arts degree in 1911.

== Political career ==
=== Early career ===
In 1924, Pillai became the thaluk president of the Indian National Congress (INC), North Parur unit. He went on to become the Travancore-Cochin secretary of the INC in 1932, and its president in 1938. He was a founding member of the Travancore State Congress. In 1939, Pillai was arrested along with several other leaders for their allegations against the Diwan of Travancore C. P. Ramaswami Iyer, and was held until they withdrew the allegations. In 1948, Pillai became the president of the Aikya Thiruvithamcore-Cochin Grandhasala Sanghom, a group that promoted public libraries in Travancore and Cochin.

=== As Premier ===
On 22 October 1948, Pillai became the second and last Prime Minister of Travancore. His government took large-scale measures to suppress the communist movement that was gaining strength in the state and organising riots against feudal lords. The next year, he became the first Chief Minister of Travancore-Cochin, after the new state was created by merging the princely states of Cochin and Travancore. His successes in the state of Travancore-Cochin is attributed to a lot of men who were his staunch supporters, among them his personal secretary, the famous freedom fighter from Karikkakom in Thiruvananthapuram, Karikkakom S. Narayana Pillai. He was unanimously elected the leader of the Congress Legislature Party and he assumed charge as the Chief Minister from 1 July 1949.

In 1951, Annie Mascarene, the former Minister for Health and Power who had resigned in January 1950, accused Minister for Public Works E. John Philipose of corruption. Pillai stood by Philipose, but Panampilly Govinda Menon, education minister, insisted that Philipose resign. In this circumstance, Pillai forwarded the resignation of the entire cabinet to Rajpramukh Chithira Thirunal Balarama Varma on 24 February 1951. Philipose later filed a defamation suit against Mascarene at the high court; this was transferred to Madras High Court at Mascarene's request, where Philipose was cleared of scandal and Mascarene was found guilty and ordered to pay compensation to Philipose.

=== Later career ===
Pillai became the Minister for Food, Labour and Education during the next ministry which was headed by C. Kesavan.

Pillai retired from politics and devoted his time to writing. He was bed ridden for a few years with arthritis until his death.

== Legacy ==
The playback singer Sujatha Mohan and late Radhika Thilak are his grand daughters and another playback singer Shweta Mohan is his great-granddaughter.

Political offices
Preceded by Pattom A. Thanu Pillai	Prime Minister of Travancore; 1948–1949	Succeeded by Office disestablished
Preceded by Office established	Chief minister of Travancore-Cochin; 1949–1951	Succeeded by C. Kesavan
