= Pattom A. Thanu Pillai =

Chief minister of Kerala

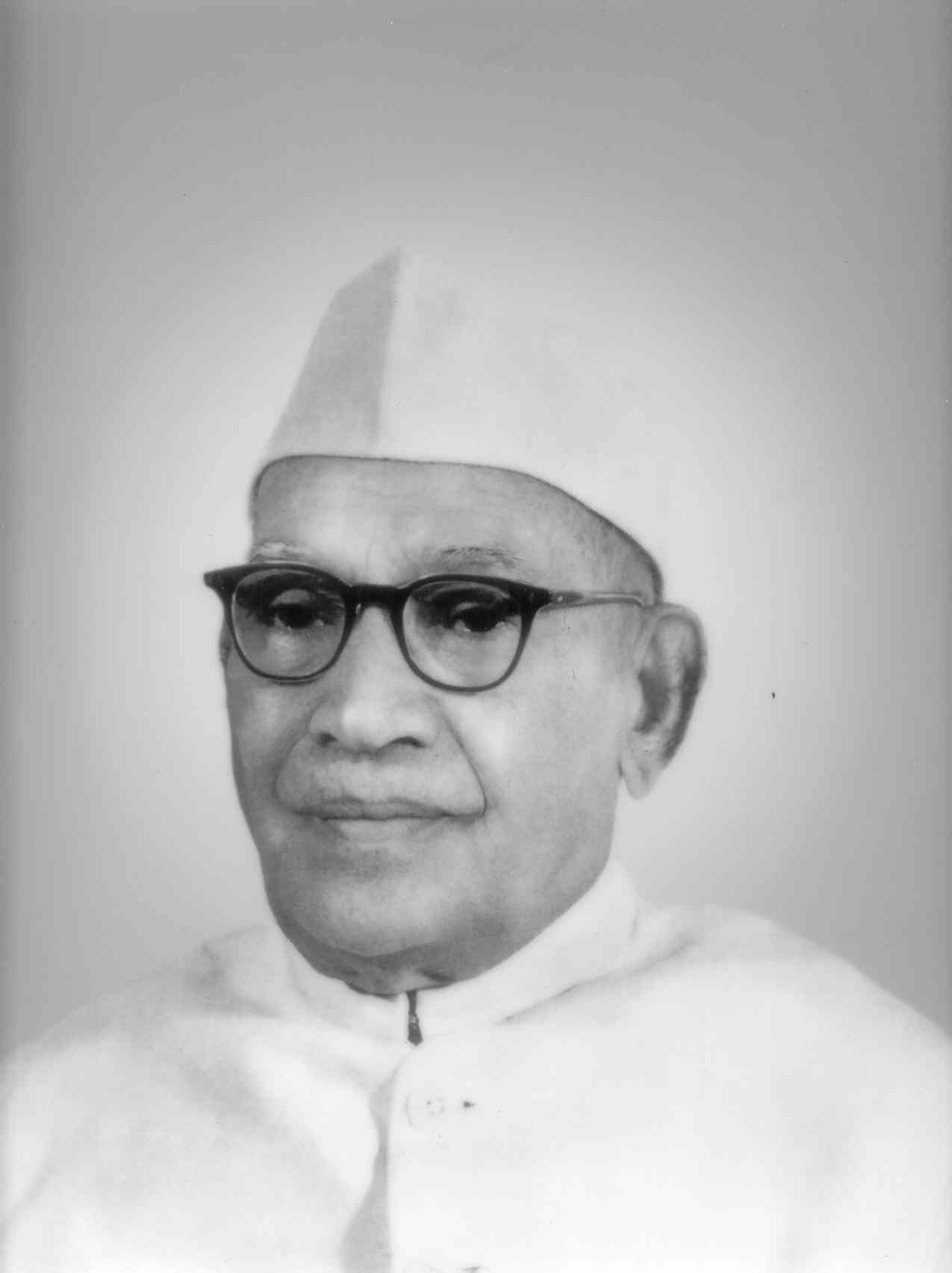

4th Governor of Andhra Pradesh
- In office 4 May 1964 – 11 April 1968
- Chief Minister: Kasu Brahmananda Reddy
- Preceded by: Satyawant Mallannah Shrinagesh
- Succeeded by: Khandubhai Kasanji Desai

4th Governor of Punjab
- In office 1 October 1962 – 4 May 1964
- Chief Minister: Partap Singh Kairon
- Preceded by: Narahar Vishnu Gadgil
- Succeeded by: Hafiz Mohammad Ibrahim

2nd Chief Minister of Kerala
- In office 22 February 1960 – 26 September 1962
- Preceded by: E. M. S. Namboodiripad
- Succeeded by: R. Sankar

4th Chief Minister of Travancore-Cochin
- In office 16 March 1954 – 10 February 1955
- Preceded by: A. J. John
- Succeeded by: Panampilly Govinda Menon

1st Prime Minister of Travancore
- In office 24 March 1948 – 17 October 1948
- Preceded by: Office Established
- Succeeded by: Parur T. K. Narayana Pillai

Personal details
- Born: 15 July 1885 Thiruvananthapuram, Travancore
- Died: 27 July 1970 (aged 85) Thiruvananthapuram, Kerala, India
- Party: Praja Socialist Party (from 1954)
- Other political affiliations: Indian National Congress (Until 1954)
- Spouse: Ponnamma Thanu Pillai
- Children: Lalithambika
- Education: Government Law College, Thiruvananthapuram

Pattom A. Thanu Pillai (15 July 1885 – 27 July 1970) was an Indian politician and independence activist who served as the 2nd Chief Minister of Kerala from 1960 to 1962. He also served as the Governor of Punjab and Andhra Pradesh. He was considered a central figure in Kerala politics.

== Early life ==
Born in Thiruvananthapuram, A.Thanu Pillai was born into a Hindu family as the son of Varada Aiyer and Eswari Amma. While working as Deputy Chief in the State Agriculture department, he earned his law degree from Law College, Thiruvananthapuram and started his legal practice as an advocate. Under the influence of his mentor A. Narayana Pillai, he was attracted towards the newly formed Travancore State Congress and he abandoned full-time practice in favour of agitating for responsible government. Following the Narayana Pillai sedition trial, he took over the leadership of Indian National Congress in Travancore.

== Political career ==
=== Early politics ===
Pattom Thanu Pillai remained as one of the leaders of Indian National Congress during the period when Kingdom of Travancore became an Independent state and later merged with Cochin to form Travancore-Cochin, and was one of the state's representatives in the Constituent Assembly. In the Assembly, he spoke on matters relating to federalism.

=== Later politics ===
First Prime Minister of Travancore After the accession of Travancore state to the Indian Union, P. G. N. Unnithan took over as the last Dewan of independent Travancore on 20 August 1947 following the resignation of C. P. Ramaswami Iyer. Unnithan chaired the Travancore Constitutional Reforms Committee and relinquished office on 24 March 1948 when a people's government with Thanu Pillai as the first Prime Minister of the Independent Travancore took over.

==== The members of the First Travancore State Council ====
Member	Role
Mr. A Thanu Pillai	Prime Minister
Mr. T. M. Varghese	Education, Industries and Transport
Mr. C. Kesavan	Public Health, Local Self Government, Forest and Labour
Mr. A. Achuthan	Public Works
Mr. K. M. Korah	Food and Agriculture
Mr. P. S. Nataraja Pillai	
Mr. G. Ramachandran	

He resigned as Prime Minister of Travancore on 17 October 1948. He was succeeded by Parur T. K. Narayana Pillai as the second and last Prime Minister of Travancore.

After India's independence in 1947, Travancore and Cochin were merged to form Travancore-Cochin on 1 July 1949. It was originally called United State of Travancore and Cochin with Thiruvananthapuram as the capital. It was renamed State of Travancore-Cochin in January 1950 and was recognized as a state. During the merger E. Ikkanda Warrier was the prime minister of the state of Cochin. Warrier resigned as the last prime minister of the state of Cochin on 30 June 1949 helping the merger of the two states. Parur T. K. Narayana Pillai was unanimously elected the leader of the Congress Legislature Party and he assumed charge as the first chief minister of Travancore-Cochin from 1 July 1949.

== Positions and work ==
First Ministry of the state of Travancore-Cochin headed by Parur T. K. Narayana Pillai resigned on 24 February 1951 following a corruption charge on the ministry. He was succeeded by C. Kesavan as the second Chief Minister of Travancore-Cochin. The first assembly of the state of Travancore-Cochin was dissolved on 12 March 1952 following the resignation of C Kesavan. Following the elections to the Legislative Assembly, held on 27 March 1952, A. J. John became the third Chief Minister of Travancore-Cochin. The second assembly of Travancore-Cochin lasted till 16 March 1954. By that time Thanu Pillai left Indian National Congress and joined Praja Socialist Party (PSP).

In the election for the third Legislative Assembly of Travancore-Cochin held in 1954, Praja Socialist Party won 19 seats (out of the contested 38) and formed a coalition government along with the Indian National Congress (INC) who had won 45 seats. Thanu Pillai became the fourth Chief Minister of Travancore-Cochin with the support of INC on 16 March 1954. He resigned on 10 February 1955 and was succeeded by Panampilly Govinda Menon as the last Chief Minister of Travancore-Cochin. He remained in office till 23 March 1956. After that, the state remained under President's rule till 5 April 1957. During this time the State of Kerala was formed under the States Reorganisation Act, 1956.

After the first ever elections to the Kerala Legislative Assembly in 1957, the Communist Party of India emerged as the single largest party. E M S Namboodiripad formed the first elected government with the support of 5 independent legislators. The government was not able to complete its full 5-year term. The Communist-led government was dissolved as a consequence of the movement known as the Vimochana Samaram (Liberation Struggle). The Communist government was dismissed on 31 July 1959 and President's rule was imposed in the state under Article 356 of the constitution. Fresh elections were held in 1960 and Thanu Pillai became the second Chief Minister of Kerala, as head of a PSP-INC-Muslim League coalition administration. He assumed office on 22 February 1960. However, he resigned on 26 September 1962 to make way for R. Sankar of the INC as the next Chief Minister of the state. He was appointed Governor of Punjab on 1 October 1962 and later Governor of Andhra Pradesh on 4 May 1964 and remained in office till 11 April 1968.

== Resignation and death ==
Two years after resigning as Governor of Andhra Pradesh, Pattom Thanu Pillai died on 27 July 1970, aged 85 at his home in Thiruvananthapuram. He was cremated with full state honours at the premises of his home.

Political offices
Preceded by none	Prime Minister of Travancore; 1948– 1948	Succeeded by Parur T. K. Narayana Pillai
Preceded by A. J. John, Anaparambil	Chief Minister of Travancore-Cochin; 1954– 1955	Succeeded by Panampilly Govinda Menon
Preceded by E. M. S. Namboodiripad	Chief Minister of Kerala; 1960– 1962	Succeeded by R. Sankar
Government offices
Preceded by Narahar Vishnu Gadgil	Governor of Punjab; 1962 – 1964	Succeeded by Hafiz Muhammad Ibrahim
Preceded by S. M. Shrinagesh	Governor of Andhra Pradesh; 1964 – 1968	Succeeded by Khandubhai Kasanji Desai
