= Travancore–Cochin =

State of India from 1949 to 1956

Coordinates: 8°26′N 76°55′E

United State of Travancore and Cochin (1949–1950) State of Travancore–Cochin (1950–1956)
- 1949–1956
- Travancore-Cochin in India, 1951
- Status: State
- Capital: Trivandrum
- Common languages: Malayalam, Tamil
- Rajpramukh
  - 1949–1956: Chithira Thirunal Balarama Varma
- Chief Minister
  - 1949–1951: Parur T. K. Narayana Pillai
  - 1951–1952: C. Kesavan
  - 1952–1954: A. J. John
  - 1954–1955: Pattom A. Thanu Pillai
  - 1955–1956: Panampilly Govinda Menon

State
- History
  - Merger of Two Kingdoms: 1 July 1949
  - Merger to Kerala and Madras State: 1956
  - Established: 1949
  - Disestablished: 1956
- Currency: Indian rupee
Preceded by	Succeeded by
Kingdom of Travancore; Kingdom of Cochin	Kerala; Madras State

Travancore–Cochin, officially the United State of Travancore and Cochin and later the State of Travancore–Cochin, was a short-lived state of India. It was formed through the merger of two former kingdoms, Travancore and Cochin on 1 July 1949. Its original capital was Trivandrum.

The five Tamil-majority Taluks of Vilavancode, Kalkulam, Thovalai, Agastheeswaram, and Sengottai were transferred from Travancore-Cochin to Madras State in 1956. The Malayalam-speaking regions of the Travancore–Cochin merged with the Malabar District (excluding Laccadive & Minicoy Islands) and the Kasaragod Taluk of South Canara district in Madras State to form the modern Malayalam-state of Kerala on 1 November 1956, according to the States Reorganisation Act, 1956 passed by the Government of India.

== History ==
Paravur T. K. Narayana Pillai, the Congress Prime Minister of Travancore, became the Chief Minister of Travancore–Cochin. The first elections were held in 1951 and A. J. John from the Congress party was elected as the Chief Minister, ruling until 1954.

The ruler of Travancore was appointed as the governor (known as "Rajpramukh") of Travancore–Cochin. The Maharajah of Cochin was offered to be addressed as Uparaja Pramukh, but he did not want any title after handing over the power. The Maharaja politely said that the eldest member of Cochin Royal Family should be called Valiya Thampuran and gave up royal powers unconditionally for the good of the people. During the tenure of Chief Minister Pattom A. Thanu Pillai of the Praja Socialist Party in 1954–1955, the Travancore Tamil Nadu Congress (TTNC) campaigned for the merger of the predominantly Tamil-speaking southern regions of Travancore–Cochin with the neighbouring Madras State, reflecting demands for linguistic reorganization aligned with Tamil identity. This occurred amid the broader Aikya Kerala Movement, which sought to unite all Malayalam-speaking areas into a single state. The agitation intensified with protests and processions; clashes occurred at Marthandam and Puthukkadai in August 1954, resulting in several deaths and highlighting deepening linguistic divisions between the communities.

Under the State Reorganisation Act of 1956, the four southern taluks of Travancore namely Thovalai, Agastheeswaram, Kalkulam and Vilavancode and a part of Sengottai in Tenkasi Taluk was merged with Madras State. On 1 November 1956 Travancore–Cochin was joined with Malabar District of Madras State to form the new state of Kerala, with a governor appointed by the President of India to be the head of the state instead of the 'Rajapramukh'.

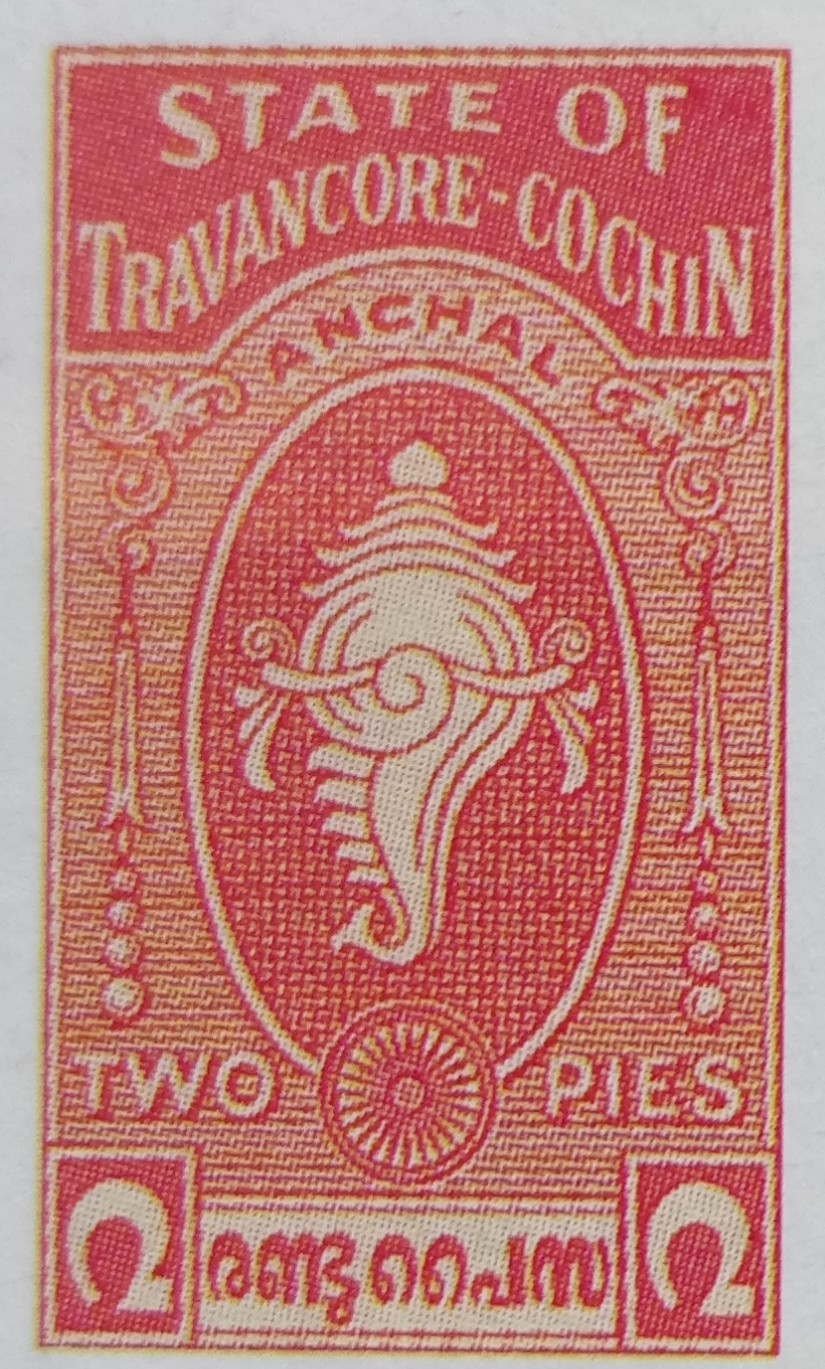
Travancore-Cochin postal stamp

=== Merger of Kanyakumari with Madras State ===
Tamils lived in large numbers in the areas of Thovalai, Agastheeswaram, Sengottai, Eraniel, Vilavancode, Kalkulam, Devikulam, Peerumedu Neyyattinkara and Thiruvananthapuram in the erstwhile Travancore State. In the predominantly Tamil-speaking southern regions of Travancore, Malayalam served as the official language with only a limited number of Tamil-medium schools available. This posed linguistic and educational challenges for Tamil-speaking residents. The Travancore State Government did not accede to requests from Tamil-speaking residents for greater use of Tamil in education and administration, prioritizing the promotion of Malayalam as the official language. During that period, the Travancore State Congress favoured the idea of uniting all the Malayalam speaking regions and the formation of a unified state for Malayalam speakers. In protest against this idea, many Tamil leaders vacated the party. Tamils gathered together in the town of Nagercoil on 16th December 1945 under the leadership of Sam Nathaniel and formed the new political party All Travancore Tamilian Congress. The party continuously compelled for the merger of Tamil regions in Travancore with the Madras State.

In the working committee meeting of Tamilian congress at Eraviputhur on 30 June 1946, the name of the political party was changed to Travancore Tamil Nadu Congress (TTNC). TTNC was popular among the Tamils living in Thovalai and Agateeswaram Taluks. Mr. Ma. Po. Sivagnanam (Ma.Po.Si) was the only leader from Tamil Nadu who functioned in favour of TTNC After the independence of India, State Assembly Elections were announced in Travancore. As a consequence, TTNC improved its popularity among Tamils. A popular and leading advocate from Vilavancode Mr. A. Nesamony organised a meeting of his supporters at Allan Memorial Hall, Nagercoil on 8 September 1947. In that meeting it was declared that they must achieve their objective through their political organisation, the TTNC started gaining strength and momentum in Kalkulam – Vilavancode taluks. During the election propaganda campaign, clashes occurred between the Tamil Nadar community and the Malayali Nair community at various places in Kalkulam – Vilavancode taluks. police force suppressed the agitating Nadars. In February 1948 the police opened fire on two Tamil speaking Nadar who subsequently succumbed due to the injuries. TTNC won in 14 constituencies in the election to the State Legislative Assembly. Mr. A. Nesamony was elected as the legislative leader of the party. Then under his leadership, the awakened Tamil population was prepared to undergo any sacrifice to achieve their goal.

In 1950, a meeting was held at Palayamkottai to make compromises between the state congress and the TTNC. The meeting met with failure and Mr. Sam Nathaniel resigned from the post of president of TTNC Mr. P. Ramasamy Pillai, a strong follower of Mr. A. Nesamony was elected as the New President. The first general election of Independent India was held on 1952. TTNC won 8 legislative assembly seats. Mr. A. Chidambaranathan became the minister on behalf of TTNC in the coalition state government formed by the Congress. In the parliamentary Constituency Mr. A. Nesamony was elected as M.P. and in the Rajyasabha seat. Mr. A. Abdul Razak was elected as the Member of Parliament on behalf of TTNC. In due course, accusing the Congress government for not showing enough care the struggle of the Tamils, TTNC had broken away from the coalition and the Congress government lost the majority. So fresh elections were announced. In 1954 elections, TTNC was victorious in 12 constituencies. Pattom Thanu Pillai was the chief minister for Thiru – Kochi legislative assembly. He engaged hard measures against the agitations of Tamils. Especially the Tamils at Devikulam –Peermade regions went through the atrocities of Travancore Police force. Condemning the attitude of the police, TTNC leaders from Nagercoil went to Munnar and participated in agitations against the prohibitive orders. The leaders were arrested and an uncalm atmosphere prevailed in South Travancore.

On 11 August, Liberation Day celebrations were held at many places in South Travancore. Public meetings and processions were organised. Communists also collaborated with the agitation programmes. Police opened fire at the processions in Thoduvetty (Martandam) and Puthukadai. Nine Tamil volunteers were fatally shot and thousands of TTNC and communist sympathizers were arrested in various parts of the region. At the end, Pattom Thanu Pillai's ministry was toppled and normalcy returned to the Tamil regions. The central government had appointed Fazal Ali Commission (December 1953) for the states reorganisation based on language. It submitted its report on 10 August 1955. Based on this report, Devikulam – Peermade and Neyyattinkara Taluks were merged with the newly formed Kerala state. On 1 November 1956 – four Taluks Thovalai, Agastheeswaram, Kalkulam, Vilavancode were recognised to form the New Kanyakumari District and merged with Tamil Nadu State. Half of Sengottai Taluk was merged with Tirunelveli District. The main demand of TTNC was to merger the Tamil regions with Tamil Nadu and major part of its demand was realised. So TTNC was dissolved thereafter.

=== Retainment of Devikulam and Peerumedu Taluks in Kerala ===
Apart from Kanyakumari district, the Taluks of Devikulam and Peermade in present-day Idukki district also had a Tamil-majority until the late 1940s. The TTNC had also requested to merge these Taluks with Madras State. However it was due to a major decision undertaken by Pattom Thanu Pillai, the first prime minister of Travancore, that led to these regions being retained in the modern state of Kerala. Pillai implemented a resettlement project designed to alter the demographic balance of the Cardamom Hills by relocating 8,000 Malayalam-speaking families into the two taluks. About 50,000 acres in these Tamil majority taluks were chosen for the project. The States Reorganisation Commission cited this initiative as evidence of the government's commitment to developing the areas, which served as a key reason in recommending that these Tamil-speaking regions remain part of Kerala.

== Prime Ministers ==
	Prime Minister	Took office	Left office	Term	Party	Region came from
1	Paravoor T. K. Narayana Pillai	1 July 1949	26 January 1950	1	Indian National Congress	Travancore

== Chief Ministers ==
	Chief Minister	Took office	Left office	Term	Party	Region came from
1	Paravoor T. K. Narayana Pillai	26 January 1950	28 February 1951	1	Indian National Congress	Travancore
2	C. Kesavan	28 February 1951	12 March 1952	1	Indian National Congress	Travancore
3	A. J. John, Anaparambil	12 March 1952	16 March 1954	1	Indian National Congress	Travancore
4	Pattom A. Thanu Pillai	16 March 1954	10 February 1955	1	Praja Socialist Party	Travancore
5	Panampilly Govinda Menon	10 February 1955	23 March 1956	1	Indian National Congress	Cochin
	President's rule	23 March 1956	5 April 1957			

== Subdivisions ==
The state had 4 districts which were divided into 36 taluks.

District	Taluks
Thiruvananthapuram	Thovala, Agastheeswaram, Kallkkulam, Vilavancode, Neyyattinkara, Thiruvananthapuram, Nedumangad, Chirayinkeezhu
Kollam	Kollam, Kottarakkara, Pathanapuram, Sengottai, Kunnathoor, Karunagappally, Karthikappally, Chengannur, Mavelikkara, Adoor, Thiruvalla, Ambalappuzha, Cherthala
Kottayam	Kottayam, Changanasserry, Vaikkom, Muvattupuzha, Kothamangalam, Thodupuzha, Meenachil, Devikulam, Peermade
Thrissur	Paravur, Kunnathunad, Kochi-Kanayannur, Kodungallur, Mukundapuram, Thrissur, Thalapilly, Chittur
