= Travancore State Congress =

Travancore State Congress also known as the State Congress is a political party which was formed in 1938 to demand responsible governance in the princely state of Travancore.

== Background ==
Following the formation of People's Ministries (responsible governments) at the provincial level in British India under the Government of India Act of 1935, the demand for responsible governance on the basis of adult suffrage in the princely states was strengthened.

In February 1938, the Haripura Conference of the AICC decided that the Indian National Congress Committees in the princely states should not be actively involved in the political movements in the princely states and that independent political organizations should be encouraged to carry on the political agitations.

In the wake of the Haripura AICC decision, in February 1938, A. Narayana Pillai's lawyer's office in Thiruvananthapuram.The political leadership meeting chaired by C. V. Kunhiraman along with another prominent freedom fighter and journalist Balaramapuram G Raman Pillai decided to form an independent political party called the Travancore State Congress. Pattom A. Thanu Pillai has been appointed as its president. Kunhiraman was the General secretary and Raman Pillai was the treasurer An interim committee was formed with P. S. Nataraja Pillai as the secretary. The State Congress came into being with the decision to launch an agitation for responsible governance in Travancore.

== Movement for responsible governance ==
When Travancore and Kochi merged to form Travancore on 1 July 1949, the Travancore State Congress became the Thiru–Kochi State Congress. This party is divided and a faction is formed. The other faction in the Praja Socialist Party, led by Thanu Pillai. And A. J. John, C. Kesavan, T. M. Varghese their fraction joined the Indian National Congress and disappeared.
