= Rubber Board =

Statutory organization

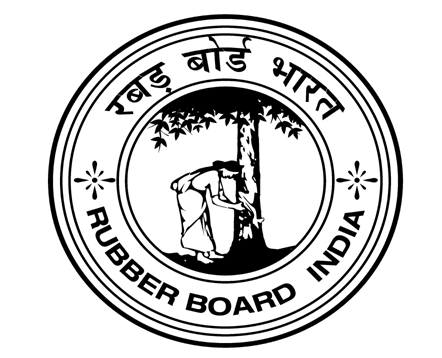
- Logo of the organisation
- Formation: 1947; 79 years ago
- Type: Indian Government Organisation
- Headquarters: Kottayam, Kerala, India
- Executive Director: Mr. M. Vasanthagesan, IRS
- Chairman: Mr. Nitin Kumar Yadav, IAS
- Parent organisation: Ministry of Commerce and Industry, Government of India
- Website: www.rubberboard.gov.in

The Rubber Board is a statutory organization of constituted under Section (4) of the Rubber Act, 1947 and functions under the administrative control of Ministry of Commerce and Industry, Government of India. The Board’s headquarters is located at Kottayam in Kerala. The Board is responsible for the development of the rubber industry in the country by way of assisting and encouraging research, development, extension and training activities related to rubber. It also maintains statistical data of rubber, takes steps to promote marketing of rubber and undertake labour welfare activities.

== Genesis of the Rubber Board ==
Commercial cultivation of natural rubber was introduced in India by the British, although the experimental efforts to grow rubber on a commercial scale in India were initiated as early as 1873 at the Botanical Gardens, Calcutta. The first commercial Hevea plantations in India were established at Thattekadu in 1902. The importance of rubber production in India for strategic and security reasons had been realised by the government during the Second World War period. The rubber growers in India were encouraged to produce the maximum rubber required for the use during war. After the war, there were growing demands from the growers for setting up a permanent organisation to look after the interests of the industry. Thereupon the government set up an ad hoc committee in 1945 to study the situation and to make appropriate recommendation. On the recommendation of this ad hoc committee, the government passed the Rubber (Production and Marketing) Act, 1947, on 18 April 1947, and the Indian Rubber Board was constituted forthwith. The Rubber Production and Marketing (Amendment) Act, 1954, amended the name of the Board as The Rubber Board

== Legislative Enactments on Rubber ==
As noted above, a consideration of the post war natural rubber scenario prompted the Government of India to pass the Rubber (Production and Marketing) Act, 1947 to provide for the overall promotion and development of the sector under its guidance and control. As envisaged in the Act, the Indian Rubber Board was set up as the statutory organization responsible for assisting the government in implementation of the various provisions of the Act. The Act which came into force on 18 April 1947 has since undergone many amendments. The Rubber production and Marketing (Amendment) Act of 1954 which took effect on 1 August 1954 made some important changes in the constitution of the Board now renamed as The Rubber Board. It clearly defined the role of the Board in the development of the industry and in formulating and implementing necessary research and development programmes. This was followed by notification of the Rubber Rules, 1955 laying down guidelines for the Board to follow in carrying out the purposes of the Act. The Rules have been subjected to need based amendments from time to time. The Rubber (Amendment) Act of 1960 made certain alterations in the rate and procedure of collection of cess on rubber. The Rubber (Amendment) Act of 1982 provided for the Central Government to appoint a part-time or whole time Chairman for the Board and, if necessary, an Executive Director for exercising such powers and performing such duties as may be prescribed or delegated to him by the Chairman. The 1994 Amendment refixed the maximum rate of cess that can be levied on rubber.

== Functions ==
The functions of the Board as defined under the Act are:

1. To promote by such measures as it thinks fit the development of the rubber industry.
2. Without prejudice to the generality of the foregoing provision the measures referred to therein may provide for:
  1. undertaking, assisting or encouraging scientific, technological or economic research.
  2. training students in improved methods of planting, cultivation, manuring and spraying.
  3. the supply of technical advice to rubber growers
  4. improving the marketing of rubber.
  5. the collection of statistics from owners of estates, dealers and manufacturers.
  6. securing better working conditions and the provision and improvement of amenities and incentives to workers.
  7. carrying out any other duties which may be vested with the Board as per rules made under this Act.
3. It shall also be the duty of the Board:
  1. to advise the Central Government on all matters relating to the development of the rubber industry, including the import and export of rubber.
  2. to advise the Central Government with regard to participation in any international conference or scheme relating to rubber.
  3. to submit to the Central Government and such other authorities as may be prescribed, half yearly reports on its activities and the working of this Act, and
  4. to prepare and furnish such other reports relating to the rubber industry as may be required by the Central Government from time to time.

== Departments and Divisions ==
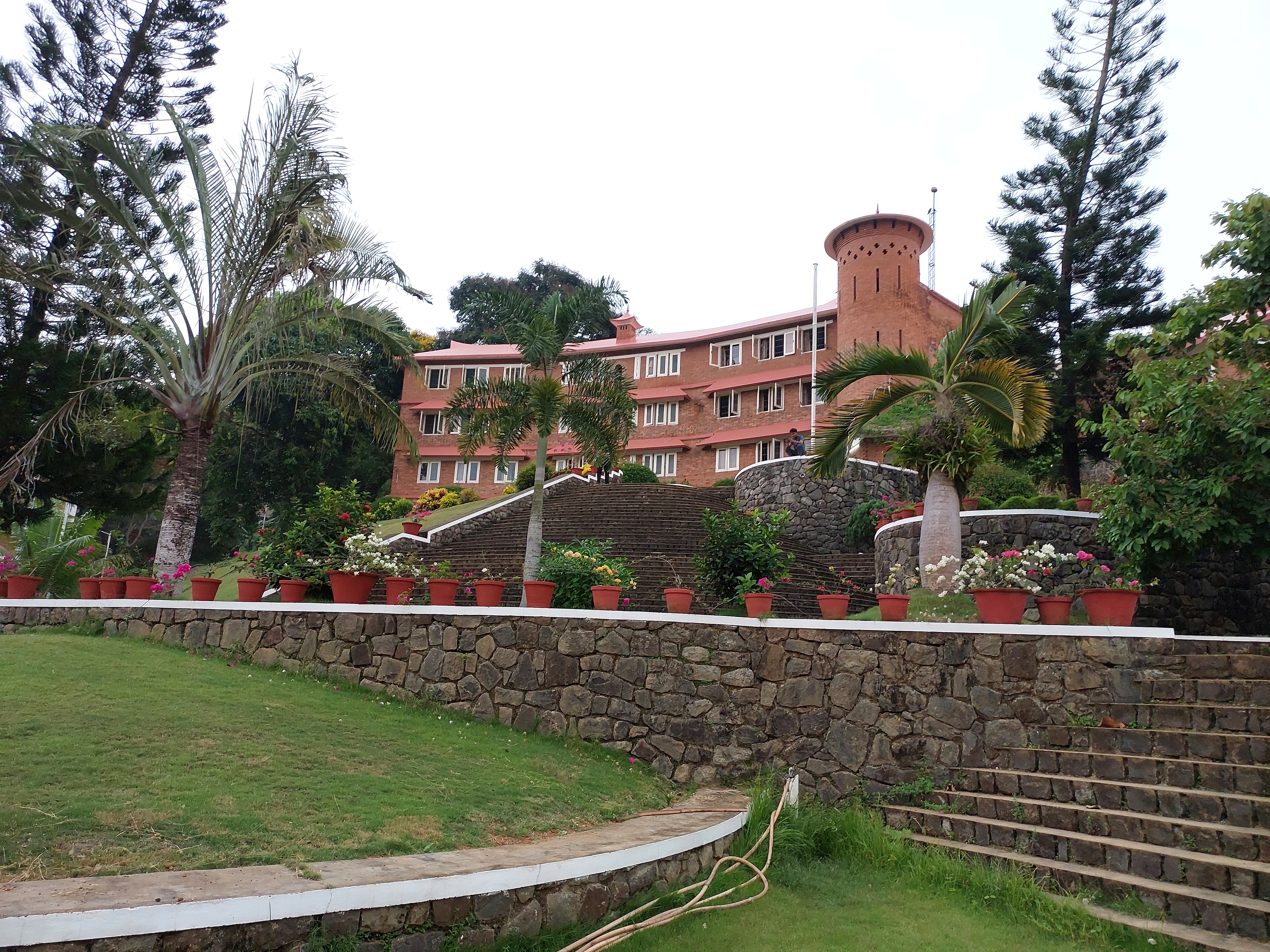
National Institute for Rubber Training, Kottayam

There are 9 departments and 4 divisions in the Rubber Board of India.

The nine departments are;

- Rubber Production Department
- Rubber Research Institute of India
- Processing and Product Development Department
- Training Department
- Administration Department
- Finance and Accounts (F&A) Department
- Licensing and Excise Duty Department
- Statistics and Planning Department
- Market Promotion Department

The four divisions are;

- Publicity and Public Relations Division
- Planning Division
- Vigilance Division
- Internal Audit

== Departments and Divisions ==
Sub Topics

- Rubber Production Department
- Rubber Research Institute of India
  - Processing and Product Development Department
  - Training Department
    - Administration Department
  - Finance and Accounts (F&A) Department
- Licensing and Excise Duty Department
  - Statistics Department
  - Market Promotion

Divisions Publicity & Public Relations Division and Vigilance Division

== Rubber Research Institute of India ==
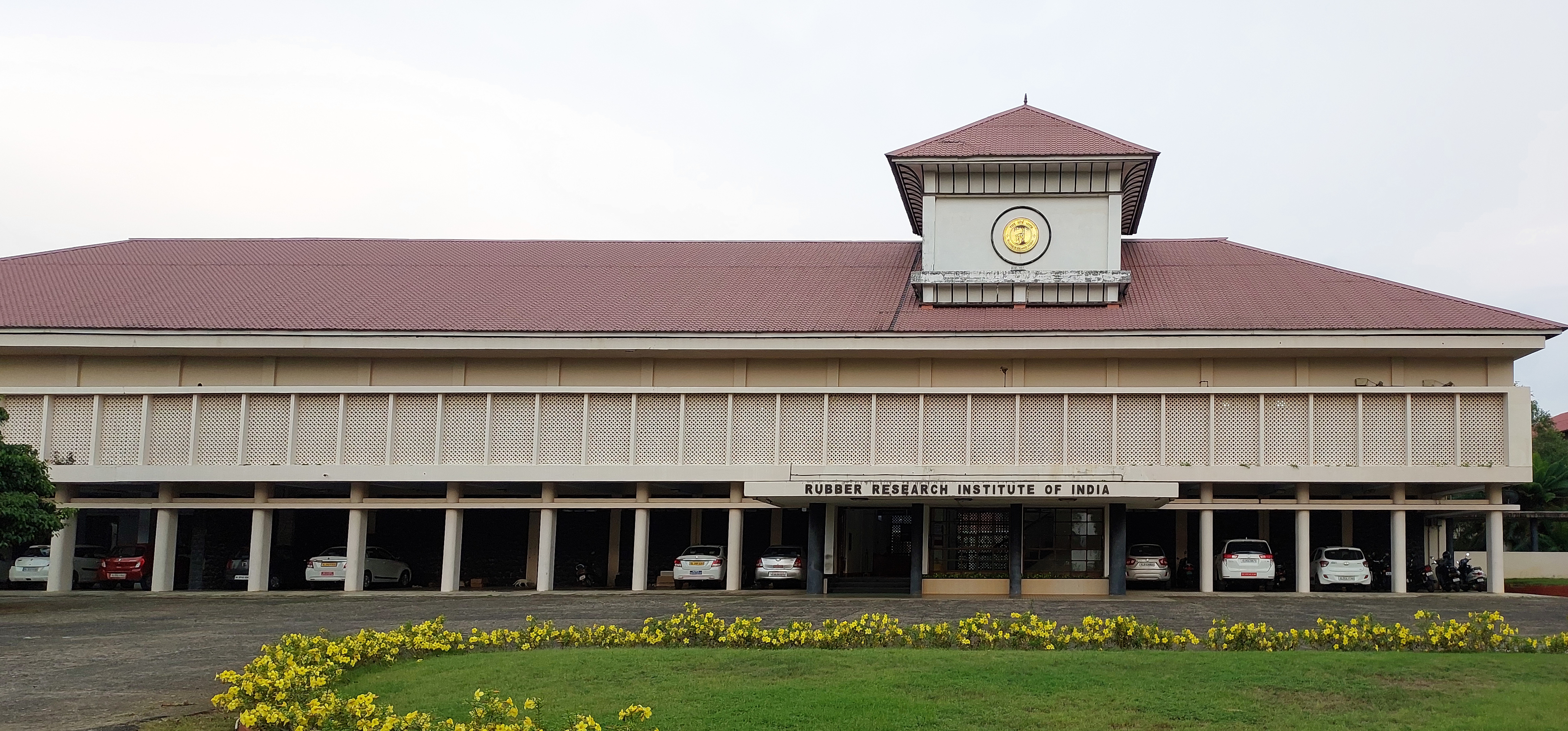
Rubber Research Institute of India

The Rubber Research Institute of India (RRII) established in 1955 is located on a hillock in the eastern suburb of Puthuppally, Kottayam, eight kilometres from the town. There are nine research disciplines, seven Regional Research Stations, two Hevean Breeding Sub-stations and a Central Experimental Station attached to the RRII. The Institute is headed by the Director (Research).

Major Divisions

1. Agricultural Economics
2. Agronomy/Soils
3. Biotechnology / Genome Analysis
4. Botany / Clone Evaluation
5. Germplasm
6. Latex Harvest
7. Plant Pathology
8. Plant Physiology
9. Rubber Technology
10. Technical Consultanc

== Rubber Production Department ==
The Department headed by the Rubber Production Commissioner is responsible for planning, formulation and implementation of schemes for improvement and expansion of rubber cultivation and production. Extension/advisory service, supplies of inputs, demonstration and training for small growers etc. are also undertaken by the RP Department. There is a well structured field establishment set up under the Rubber Production Department which renders free advisory and extension services to rubber growers on all aspects of rubber cultivation, production, processing and marketing and simultaneously attends to implementation of various development schemes as well. The set up comprises four Zonal Offices, 44 Regional Offices and 191 Field Offices located at all important rubber growing centers. The Rubber Production Department formulates and implements all schemes relating to cultivation and production, most schemes relating to processing and the schemes for promoting and assisting small holders’ self-help groups.

The development strategy for natural rubber production has to keep in view the following essential requirements: • Optimisation of production from existing plantations through replanting with improved cultivars and better agro management • Expansion of cultivation in traditional plantation areas, identification of suitable non-traditional areas that are fit for economic production and extension of cultivation to such areas • Reduction of cost of production to withstand challenges from competing crops, synthetic substitutes and cheap imports • Upgradation of quality of produce to meet the increasingly exacting demands of consuming industries • Formation and effective working of small holders’ self-help groups to ensure informed community participation to create infrastructure to facilitate organised production, processing and marketing chains to gain maximum returns. The approach also takes care of the needs of the resource poor farmers who also got an opportunity not only to derive benefits offered under various schemes but to contribute to the decision making process.

The important development schemes and activities undertaken through the Department are the following:

1. Rubber Plantation Development Scheme.
2. Production and distribution of improved planting materials.
3. Advisory and extension services to growers.
4. Demonstration of scientific planting and production.
5. Supplies of equipment and materials requiring popularisation.
6. Identification of non-traditional areas suitable for rubber and planning and undertaking activities for its promotion in such areas.
7. Schemes for productivity enhancement in small holdings
8. Schemes for improvement of quality of small holder rubber.
9. Schemes for extra income generation form rubber plantations - Apiculture
10. Block planting, group planting etc. for promotion of rubber among scheduled caste/scheduled tribe members.
11. Promotion of activities of voluntary associations(Rubber Producers' Societies) and self-help groups among small growers.
12. Training of tappers.

The central office of the Department functions at the Board's central office in Kottayam. The field services are rendered through Zonal/Regional offices and Field Offices. Other establishments are nurseries, demonstration and training centers and tappers training schools.

== International cooperation ==
India is maintaining close associations with several international organizations connected with rubber. The important organizations are: IRSG, ANRPC and IRRDB

- International Rubber Study Group (IRSG)
- ANRPC
- IRRDB
