= A. J. John =

Chief minister of Travancore-Cochin

3rd Chief Minister of Travancore-Cochin
- In office 12 March 1952 – 16 March 1954
- Preceded by: C. Kesavan
- Succeeded by: Pattom A. Thanu Pillai
- Constituency: Poonjar

Governor of Madras State
- In office 1956–1957
- Appointed by: Rajendra Prasad
- First Minister: K. Kamaraj
- Succeeded by: Bhishnuram Medhi
- Preceded by: Sri Prakasa

Personal details
- Born: 18 July 1893 Thalayolaparambu, Travancore, British India
- Died: 1 October 1957 (aged 64) Madras, Madras State, India
- Party: Travancore State Congress (Merged with Indian National Congress)

Anaparambil Joseph John (18 July 1893 – 1 October 1957) was an Indian politician and statesman. He was Chief Minister of Travancore-Cochin and Governor of Madras State.

== Early life ==
He was born in 1893, to Joseph of the Anaparambil house at Thalayolaparambu and had his primary education at the local school and finished his school final from Vaikom High School. After doing the degree in law in 1919 from the Law College, Madras, he began his career as a lawyer.

The turning point in John's life came when he plunged into freedom struggle after abandoning his bright future in his profession. He was one of the founding leaders of Travancore State Congress.

He was in the forefront of the historic Abstention Movement which rocked Travancore for some time; an agitation against social injustice staged by the weaker sections and backward classes for proportionate representations in government service. He fought against Independent Travancore proposed by C. P. Ramaswami Aiyar in 1946.

== Chief Minister of Travancore-Cochin ==
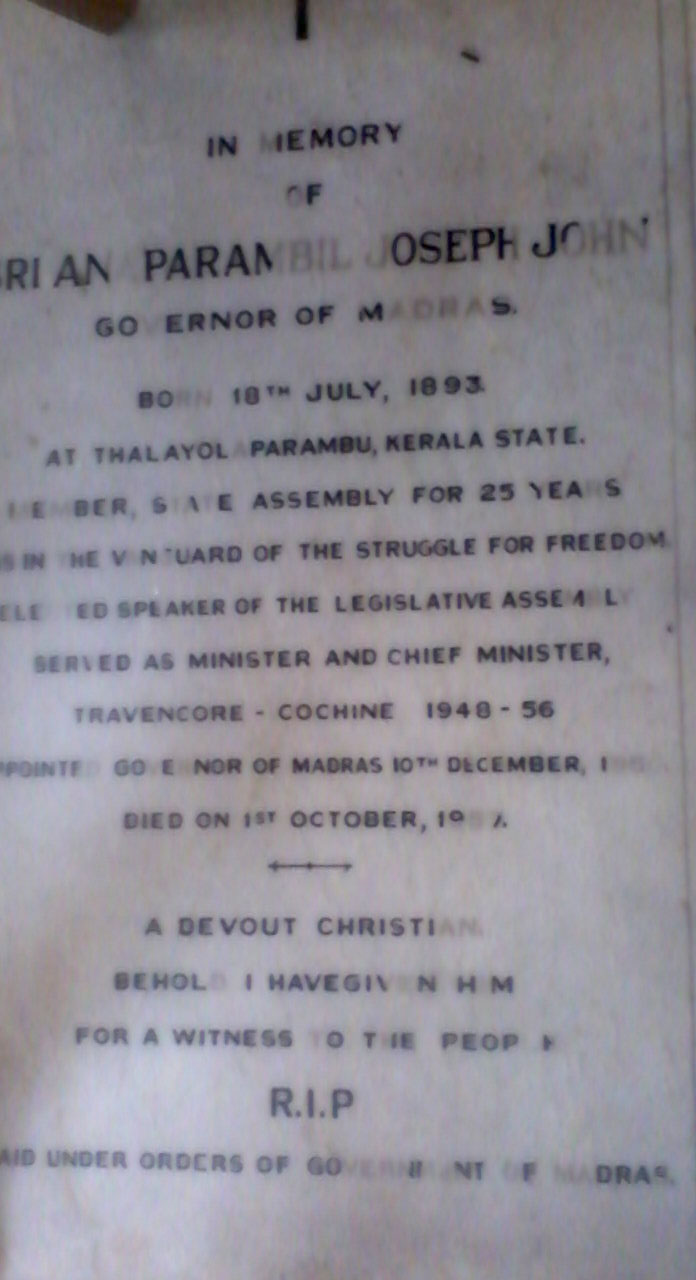
A. J. John's tombstone

In the first general elections held in India in 1951–52, John was elected from Poonjar constituency to the Travancore-Cochin Legislative Assembly. The Congress formed Government with A. J. John as Chief Minister in March 1952 with the support of the Travancore Tamil Nadu Congress (T.T.N.C.). The ministry lost confidence motion due to the withdrawal of support from the T.T.N.C.

He also served as Speaker of the first Travancore Legislative Assembly in 1948, and as Minister in all subsequent ministries up to 1956.

== Governor of Madras State ==
A. J. John was appointed Governor of Madras State in 1956 and continued in that office until his death.
