= C. Kesavan =

Former chief minister of Travancore-Cochin

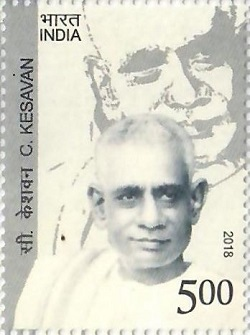
- Kesavan from a 2018 stamp of India

2nd Chief Minister of Travancore-Cochin
- In office 28 February 1951 – 12 March 1952
- Preceded by: Paravoor T. K. Narayana Pillai
- Succeeded by: A. J. John

Personal details
- Born: 23 May 1891 Mayyanad, Kingdom of Travancore, British India (Now in Kerala, India)
- Died: 7 July 1969 (aged 78) Mayyanad, Kerala, India
- Party: Indian National Congress
- Spouse: Vasanthi

C. Kesavan (23 May 1891 – 7 July 1969) was an Indian politician who served as the chief minister of Travancore-Cochin from 1950 to 1952. He began his public life as an activist in the Ezhava movement, and gained prominence through his leadership in the Nivarthana movement (abstension movement) in Travancore, demanding adequate representation for backward communities in the legislature.

== Early life ==
He was born in 1891 in the village of Mayyanad, near Kollam in the then princely state of Travancore. For some time he worked as a teacher and then took a law degree from Thiruvananthapuram and started practice in Kollam.

== Career ==
=== As activist ===
Kesavan was influenced by the work of Padmanabhan Palpu, a social reform campaigner who was a member of the Ezhava community and a founder of the Sree Narayana Dharma Paripalana Yogam (SNDP) association where he later rose to the general secretary post. In 1930s, Kesavan argued that the Ezhavas should declare that they do not belong to the Hindu religion.

From 1933, Kesavan was one of the prominent leaders of Abstention movement or Nivarthana Prakshobham in Travancore of present-day Kerala. Due to a speech he made at a public meeting in Kozhencherry he was arrested on 7 June 1935, tried for sedition, and sentenced to two years imprisonment.

=== As politician ===
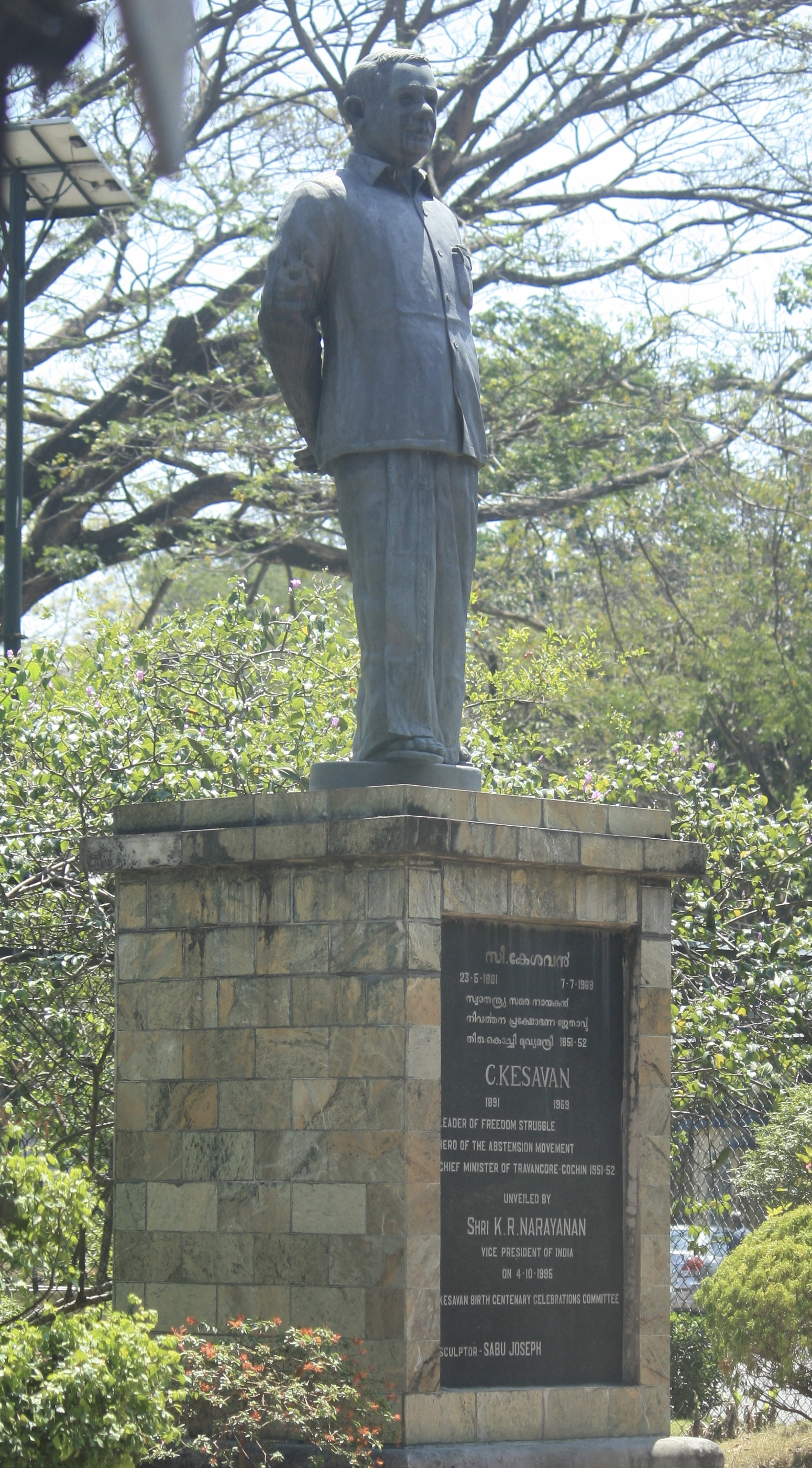
Statue of C. Kesavan in Thiruvananthapuram.

Kesavan took an active part in organizing Travancore State Congress and became a member of its working Committee. During the agitation for responsible government in Travancore, he was arrested several times. During Quit India movement in 1942, Kesavan was sentenced to one year simple imprisonment and was released on 19 July 1943. After independence, Kesavan was elected to Travancore Assembly and became a member of the first cabinet headed by Pattom Thanu Pillai, but resigned after few months. Kesavan became Chief Minister of the erstwhile Travancore-Cochin (Thiruvithamkoor-Kochi) state in 1951 and was elected to State Assembly in 1952.

The Kollam Corporation Town Hall was named the C. Kesavan Memorial Municipal Town Hall in Kesavan's memory. It is on the National Highway passing through the Kollam Cantonment. The building is now one of the main venues for several cultural events and meetings. He was instrumental in starting the Medical College at Thiruvananthapuram. He has also worked for establishing a Govt. Hospital in his home town Mayyanad which functioned well in its helm days and later shrank to a health center.

In May 1950, he made a controversial statement when a fire broke out at the Sabarimala Temple. He remarked: "If a temple is destroyed that much of superstition will be destroyed" ("ഒരു അമ്പലം നശിച്ചാല്‍ അത്രയും അന്ധവിശ്വാസം നശിക്കും").

=== As chief minister ===
Kesavan was sworn in as Chief Minister of Travancore-Cochin on 3 March 1951. T. K. Narayana Pillai and A. J. John were the ministers. Both the ministers resigned in September 1951. After the declaration of general election of 1952, the Kesavan ministry relinquished power on 12 March 1952. The Land Reforms Bill was piloted by Kesavan, but failed to pass. The Trivandrum Medical College was opened by Prime Minister Jawaharlal Nehru during Kesavan's tenure.

Ministry members
| Member | Role | Dates |
|---|---|---|
| Mr. C. Kesavan | Chief Minister | |
| Mr. Parur T.K. Narayana Pillai | Food, Labour and Education | Assumed office on 5 March 1951 Resigned with effect from 5 September 1951 |
| Mr. A. J. John | Finance, Revenue and Public Health | Assumed office on 5 March 1951 and resigned with effect from 5 September 1951 |
| Mr. K. M. Korah (Karivelithara Mathew Korah) | Finance and Food | (Assumed office on 6 September 1951) |
| Mr. G. Chandrasekhara Pillai | Public Works | (Assumed office on 6 September 1951) |
| Mr. L. M. Pylee | Education and Revenue | (Assumed office on 6 September 1951) |
| Mr. P. K. Krishnan Kutty Menon | Industries and Labour | (Assumed office on 6 September 1951 and resigned with effect from 6 March 1952) |

== Personal life ==
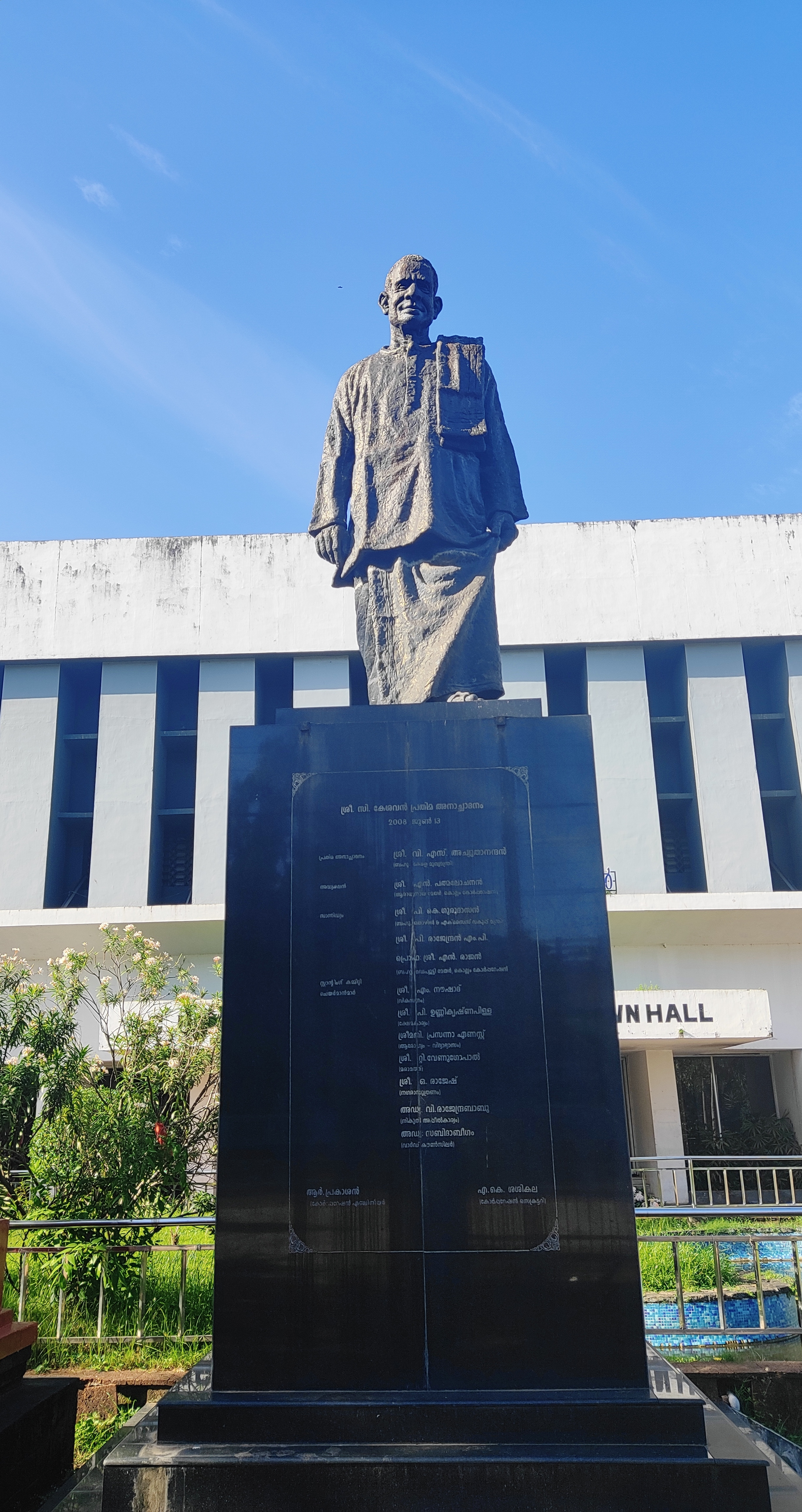
C Keshavan Statue, Kollam Town hall July 2023

Kesavan was married to Vasanthi who was the daughter of C. V. Kunhiraman, the founder of Kerala Kaumudi. His son K. R. Bhadran died in an Air India Dakota plane crash near Mettupalayam in December 1950. At that time Kesavan was living in Ross House at Thiruvananthapuram which was widely considered as a haunted house and bad omen among political class of Kerala.

=== Autobiography ===
Kesavan wrote an incomplete autobiography titled Jeevitha Samaram (transl. Life struggles). The preface to his book was written by his son K. Balakrishnan. The first volume was published in 1953, followed by second volume in 1965. He died before writing the third volume. Udaya Kumar says that his "early memories are tinged with two hues of injustice: the discrimination he suffered as a backward Ezhava boy on the streets and other public places, where he was forced to defer to upper-caste people, and the unjust exercise of authority by the elders and the upper sub-divisions within the Ezhava caste".

== See also ==
- Sree Narayana Dharma Paripalana Yogam
- Government Medical College, Thiruvananthapuram
- Kollam
- Sabarimala
- Travancore-Cochin

Political offices
| Preceded by Parur T. K. Narayana Pillai | Chief minister of Travancore-Cochin; 1951–1952 | Succeeded by A. J. John, Anaparambil |
