= List of Saint Thomas Christians =

This is a list of prominent Syrian Christians of Kerala.

== Government of India ==
- P. J. Thomas, Parakunnel, an economist who served as first economic advisor of independent India (1942–1948), member of Indian delegation that signed the UN Charter (1945), Member of Parliament, Rajya Sabha (1957–1962) and founder-principal of St. Thomas College, Palai (1950–1952).
- A. M. Thomas Union Minister, Chairman Khadi Commission )
- John Mathai, an economist who served as India's first Railway Minister (1947–1948), as Finance Minister (1949–1950), first Chairman of State Bank of India (1955), Vice Chancellor of University of Mumbai (1955–1957) and of University of Kerala (1957–1959).
- M. M. Jacob – Ministries of Parliamentary Affairs, Water Resources and Home Affairs at different periods (1987–93).
- A. K. Antony, politician who served as Defence Minister of India (2006–2014), Chief Minister of Kerala (1977–78, 1995–96, 2001–2004) and Member of Parliament, Rajya Sabha (1985–1995, 2005–present).
- P. J. Kurien – 18th Deputy Chairman of the Rajya Sabha (2012–2018)
- P. C. Chacko

=== Governors of states ===
- K. M. Chandy (politician) – Governor of Gujarat, Governor of Madhya Pradesh
- P. C. Alexander
  - ninth Governor of Tamil Nadu, 1988–1990
  - seventeenth Governor of Maharashtra, 1993–2002
  - seventh Governor of Goa, 1996–1998
- P. V. Cherian – eighth Governor of Maharashtra, 1964–1969
- M. M. Jacob – ninth Governor of Meghalaya, 1995–2007
- A. J. John, Anaparambil – fourth Governor of Madras, 1956–1957
- Madathilparampil Mammen Thomas Governor of Nagaland, 1990–1992

=== Council of Ministers, India ===
- John Mathai – Minister for Finance (1948–1950)
- A.K. Antony – Minister of Defence (2006–2014) – Minister for Consumer Affairs, Food and Public Distribution (1993–1995)

=== Minister of State (Independent Charges) ===
- Alphons Kannanthanam, BJP – Union Minister of State for Electronics and Information Technology, Culture, and Tourism (2016–2019)

=== Minister of State (MoS) ===
- M. M. Jacob – Ministries of Parliamentary Affairs, Water Resources and Home Affairs at different periods (1987–93)

== State governments ==
=== Chief Ministers of Kerala ===
- A. K. Antony – Former Chief Minister of Kerala.
- Oommen Chandy – Former Chief Minister of Kerala.

=== Chief Ministers of Travancore-Cochin (1949-56) ===
- Anaparambil Joseph John – Former Chief Minister of Kerala, 2nd Assembly (1952–53) (1951 election)

== Ministers ==
- T. M. Varghese – Minister for Education, Travancore (1948), of Travancore-Cochin (1952)
- Anoop Jacob – Minister for Food and Civil Supplies (2011–2016)
- Baby John – Minister for Revenue & Labour (1970–77)
- E. John Jacob – Minister for Food and Civil Supplies (1977)
- Jose Thettayil – Minister for Transport (2006–11)
- Joseph Mundassery – Minister for Education & Co-operation, Kerala (1957–1959)
- K. C. George – Minister for Food and Forest (1957–59)
- K. C. Joseph – Minister for Information & Public Relations, Rural Development and Norka roots. (2011–16)
- K. M. George – Minister for Transport & Health (1969–70)
- K. M. Mani – Minister for Finance (1975–1977; 1980–1986; 2011–2016); Home Affairs (1977–1979); Irrigation (1987); Revenue (1991–1996; 2001–2006)
- C. F. Thomas – Minister for Culture (2001–2004)
- K. T. Jacob – Minister for Revenue (1969–72)
- Mathew T. Thomas – Minister for Transport (2006–2009)
- Monce Joseph – Minister for Public Works (2007–2009)
- N. M. Joseph – Minister for Forests (1987–1991)
- P. J. Joseph – Minister for Public Works (1996–2001, 2006 and 2009–2010); Water Resources (2011–2016)
- P. P. George – Minister for Labour and Employment
  - Labour and Employment
- P. T. Chacko – Minister for Home Affairs (1960–1964)
- T. M. Jacob – Minister for Education (1982–1987)
- T. V. Thomas – Minister for Labour, Employment and Transport (1957–59)
- T. S. John – Minister for Food and Civil Supplies (1977 - 1978)
- E. P. Poulose – Minister for Food and Agriculture (1960–1964)

=== Other states ===
- K. J. George – Minister of Home, Karnataka (2013–2016)

== Political leaders ==
- C.P.Mathen – Member of Parliament (1952); Indian Ambassador to Sudan (1957–1960)
- Mathai Manjooran – member of Rajya Sabha (1952–1954)
- K. M. George – member, Kerala Legislative Assembly (1960–1964) founder Kerala Congress (1964)
- P. Chacko MLA – Member, Kerala Legislative Assembly (1960–1964)
- Dr. George Thomas – Kerala Legislative Assembly (1967–1970)
- P.J. Kurien – Member and Deputy Speaker of Rajya Sabha from Kerala (2012–incumbent)
- Oommen Chandy – former chief minister Kerala (2446 days)
- Charles Dias – first Malayalee nominated as Anglo Indian MP
- Alphonse Kannanthanam – former Central Tourism, IT, Electronics Minister; BJP Rajyasabha MP from Kerala

== Award winners ==
=== Padma Vibhushan ===
- John Matthai – Literature & Education (1959)
- Verghese Kurien – Dairy farming & food production (1999)
- George Sudarshan – Science & Engineering (2007)

=== Padma Bhushan ===
- Dr. Jacob Chandy – Neurosciences & surgery (1964)
- Kandathil Mammen Cherian – Literature & Education (1971)
- Pothan Joseph – Literature & Education (1973)
- George Sudarshan – Literature & Education (1976)
- Thomas Kailath – Science and Engineering (2009)
- T. K. Oommen – sociologist
- Thayil Jacob Sony George (T. J. S. George) – Literature & Education (2011)
- Jacob Cherian – Social Work (1999)
- Philipose Chrysostyom Mar Thoma -Social & Religious Service (2018)

=== Padma Shri ===
- Perakath Verghese Benjamin – Medicine (1955)
- Kandathil Mammen Cherian – Literature & Education (1965)
- Dr. Mary Poonen Lukose – Obstetrics and gynaecology (1975)
- Manathoor Devasia Valsamma, M. D. Valsamma – Sports (1983)
- T. K. Alex – Science and Technology (2007)
- Jose Chacko Periappuram – Medicine (2011); first heart transplant Kerala

=== National Medal of Science ===
- Thomas Kailath (2012) – presented by President Barack Obama in 2014 for "transformative contributions to the fields of information and system science, for distinctive and sustained mentoring of young scholars, and for translation of scientific ideas into entrepreneurial ventures that have had a significant impact on industry"

=== Booker Prize ===
- Arundhati Roy – awarded the 1997 Booker Prize for her novel The God of Small Things

=== Fellow of the British Academy ===
- Rajesh Chandy

=== The Medal of the Order of Australia ===
- Sajeev Koshy

== Civil Services ==
=== India ===
- Abraham Mathai Nooranal, IES, IPS, UN International Civil Service, retired as Chief Security Advisor of United Nations Human Rights, Geneva, continuing as a Europe based Senior Consultant at the UN.
- Alexander Jacob – Retired IPS, former Kerala Director General of Police
- B. G. Verghese – former information adviser to Prime Minister Indira Gandhi
- P.J Thomas Parakunnel – first Chief Economic Advisor of India
- Anna Malhotra – first female member of the Indian Administrative Service
- Hormis Tharakan – former Chief of the Research and Analysis Wing
- Jacob Thomas – retired IPS, former Director General of Vigilance & Anti-Corruption Bureau (VACB), Government of Kerala
- Jacob Punnoose – Director General of Police of Kerala and as the State Police Chief
- Merin Joseph – Youngest woman IPS
- M.O. Mathai - Private Secretary to India's first Prime Minister Jawaharlal Nehru.
- P. J. Thomas – 14th Central Vigilance Commissioner of India
- Ranjan Mathai – 28th Foreign Secretary of India.
- V. J. Kurian – Additional Chief Secretary to the Government of Kerala, managing director of Cochin International Airport

=== Australia ===
- Peter Varghese – Former Secretary of the Department of Foreign Affairs and Trade

== Military leaders ==
=== Indian Army ===
- Lieutenant General Philip Campose – Vice Chief of the Army Staff of the Indian Army
- Lieutenant General Bobby Cherian Mathews – General officer commanding of Konark Corps
- Havildar Thomas Philipose – medal winner in the Indo-Pakistani War of 1971

=== Indian Navy ===
- Admiral Ronald Lynsdale Pereira – 9th Chief of Naval Staff of the Indian Navy (1979–1982), former Flag Officer Commanding-in-Chief of the Eastern Fleet (FOCEF), Eastern Naval Command, former Flag Officer Commanding-in-Chief of the Southern Naval Command and former Flag Officer Commanding-in-Chief of the Western Naval Command
- Vice Admiral EC Kuruvila, Western Fleet Commander during India-Pakistan War (1971), Chairman & Managing Director, Mazagon Dock, Mumbai (1972–1976)

== Law ==
=== Supreme Court Judges ===
- K. K. Mathew (1971–1976)
- Kurian Joseph (2013–)
- K. Thomas (1985–2006)
- Cyriac Joseph (2008–2012)
- K. M. Joseph (2018–2023)

=== High Court Judges ===
- Anna Chandy, first woman judge of an Indian High Court
- Bechu Kurian Thomas, judge of Kerala High Court
- J. B. Koshy, Chief Justice Patna high court
- Mary Joseph, Kerala High Court judge
- P. Cherian, high court judge of Travancore
- Antony Dominic, former Chief Justice of Kerala
- Pius C. Kuriakose, Chief Justice of Sikkim High court
- Shaji P. Chaly, Kerala High Court judge
- Sunil Thomas, Kerala High Court judge
- T. C. Poonen, High court judge of Travancore and the first Malayali to study law in England.
- Sathish Ninan, present Kerala High court judge

=== Lawyers ===
- Barrister George Joseph (1887–1938) – lawyer and Indian independence activist. Remembered for his role in Home Rule agitation and Vaikom Satyagraha, and for his editorship of Motilal Nehru's The Independent and Mahatma Gandhi's Young India.
- Rose Varghese – former Vice Chancellor of National University of Advanced Legal Studies, Kochi.
- Advocate V.J Mathai – lawyer and Indian independence activist, Best known for being the first Indian to defeat a European in an election.

== Academia ==
=== Scientists ===
- George Varghese – Principal Researcher at Microsoft Research

=== Faculty ===
- Abraham Verghese – professor of medicine at Stanford University
- George Sudarsan – Padma Vibhushan Emeritus professor
- Thomas Kailath – Padma Bhushan; Professor of Engineering
- George Varghese – Professor of Computer Science
- K. Mani Chandy – Professor of Computer Science
- Mathai Varghese – Professor of Mathematics
- Prema Kurien – Professor of Sociology
- Priya Kurian – Professor of economics
- Thomas Zacharia – computer scientist
- Varghese Mathai – professor of mathematics at University of Adelaide
- Pius Malekandathil – Professor of History at Jawaharlal Nehru University, New Delhi

=== Heads of institutions ===
- Mathai Varghese – Director of the Institute for Geometry and its Applications (IGA), Adelaide
- Eluvathingal Devassy Jemmis – Director of Indian Institute of Science Education and Research, Thiruvananthapuram
- K. T. Chandy – Founder and former director of Indian Institute of Management Calcutta, the first Indian Institute of Management

=== Medical sciences ===
- Mary Poonen Lukose – first female surgeon general of India
- Abraham Verghese – Professor of Medicine and Senior Associate Chair of Department of Internal Medicine at Stanford University School of Medicine
- Lucy Oommen – Indian gynaecologist, first medical director of Indian origin at the St Stephen's Hospital, Delhi
- Sunny Kurian – founder president of the UAE wing of the Indian Academy of Pediatrics
- Thomas Thomas – first Indian cardio-thoracic surgeon
- Jacob Chandy – first neurosurgeon in India
- Prof Joseph Vettukattil. Inventor AFR device, VASO, VB stent. Endowed chair Congenital Cardiology Research. First certified pediatric cardiologist UK. Structured multiplanar reformating of 3D echocardiography. First to do 3D printing from echocardiography and first in the world to do multimodality image integration.

== Business and commerce ==
- M. G. George Muthoot – Chairman of Muthoot Group
- Thomas Kurian – Global President of Product Development at Oracle Corporation, CEO of Google Cloud
- Reji Abraham – Managing Director of ABAN Group of Companies
- C J George – founder and CEO of Geojit Financial Services
- George Alexander Muthoot – Managing Director of Muthoot Finance & Muthoot Group
- Verghese Kurien – founder Chairman of Gujarat Co-operative Milk Marketing Federation Ltd.
- Joy Alukkas – Chairman of Joyalukkas Group
- K.M. Mammen Mappilai – founder of MRF Tyres and Manorama publications
- Kochouseph Chittilappilly – Managing Director of V Guard Industries Ltd
- Mathunny Mathews – former MD of Al-Sayer Group; former Chairman of Jabriya Indian School; co-founder of Indian Arts Circle, Kuwait
- Sunny Varkey – Founder of GEMS Education
- Thachil Mathoo Tharakan, Trader and Former Commerce Minister of Travancore
- Sabu M Jacob – managing director of Kitex Garments Limited.

== Social reformers ==
=== Independence activists ===
- Kuriakose Elias Chavara - scholar, educator and community leader of Chaldean Syrians
- Accamma Cherian – Jhansi Rani of Travancore
- T. M. Varghese – Minister of Travancore-Cochin
- George Joseph – lawyer, trade unionist and nationalist activist
- Titus Theverthundiyil – one among who led the Dandi March.
- A. J. John, Anaparambil – one of the founding leaders of Travancore State Congress. Former Chief Minister of Kerala.2nd Assembly (1952–53) (1951 election)
- Rosamma Punnoose – independence activist, politician and lawyer and the first person to be sworn in as a member of the Kerala Legislative Assembly.

== Religion ==
=== Saints ===
==== Malankara Orthodox Syrian Church ====
- Gheevarghese Gregorios of Parumala – Malankara Church
- Geevarghese Dionysius of Vattasseril – Malankara Metropolitan Malankara Orthodox Syrian Church

==== Jacobite Syrian Christian Church ====
- Paulose Athanasius – Methropolitian of Jacobite Syrian Church (entombed in Aluva Thrikkunnathu Seminary )
- Koorilos Paulose – Malankara Metropolitan (Entombed in Panampady Church)

==== Malabar Independent Syrian Church ====
- Kattumangattu Abraham Koorilos I Metropolitan Of Thozhiyur Malabar Independent Syrian Church (Entombed in St. George Cathedral Church Thozhiyur)

==== Pazhayakoor ====
===== Syro Malabar Church (Catholic) =====
- Saint Alphonsa, born Anna Muttathupadathu
- Kuriakose Elias Chavara
- Euphrasia Eluvathingal
- Mariam Thresia

===== Chaldean Syrian Church =====
- Abimalek Timotheus

=== Heads of Churches ===
==== Malankara Syrian Churches (puthenkoor nasranis) ====
===== Malankara Orthodox Syrian Church =====
- Baselios Marthoma Paulose II- erstwhile Supreme Head, Catholicos of the East and the Malankara Metropolitan
- Baselios Marthoma Mathews III – Supreme Head, Catholicos of the East and the Malankara Metropolitan

===== Jacobite Syrian Christian Church =====
- Baselios Thomas I – Catholicos of India
- Baselios Joseph - Catholicos of India

===== Malankara Mar Thoma Syrian Church =====
- Theodosius Mar Thoma – Supreme Head of Malankara Marthoma Syrian Church and Metropolitan of the Throne of Malankara

===== Malabar Independent Syrian Church =====
- Cyril Baselios I – Supreme Head and primate Metropolitan Of Thozhiyur Malabar Independent Syrian Church

===== Syro-Malankara Church =====
- Baselios Cleemis
- Cyril Baselios
- Benedict Gregorios
- Geevarghese Ivanios

==== Heads of the Chaldean Syrian Churches (Pazhayakoor Nasranis) ====
===== Syro-Malabar Church =====
- Raphael Thattil
- George Alencherry
- Varkey Vithayathil
- Antony Padiyara

===== Chaldean Syrian Church =====
- Aprem Mooken

=== Others ===
- George Menachery (born 1938) – historian, editor of the St. Thomas Christian Encyclopedia of India
- Acharya K K Chandy – Founder Member, Christavashram, Kottayam.
- Joshua Ignathios – Bishop of the Eparchy of Mavelikara.
- Geevarghese Ivanios – Servant of God, OIC (1882–1953).
- Placid Podipara – Syriacist, Syro-Malabar Theologian and Church historian
- V. C. Samuel – Syrian Orthodox Theologian and Church Historian
- Sebastian Kappen – liberation theologian
- Varghese Payyappilly Palakkappilly – Venerable and the founder of the Congregation of the Sisters of the Destitute.
- Curien Kaniamparambil – Syriacist, Syriac Orthodox theologian and church historian
- Joseph Powathil – Archbishop of Syro-Malabar Catholic Archdiocese of Changanassery
- Philipose Chrysostom Mar Thoma – Marthoma Valiya Metropolitan

== Humanities ==
=== Grammarian & Linguist ===
- Rev. George Mathan – first Malayali to produce an authoritative Grammar Book for Malayalam (1863), in Malayalam.
- Thomas Koonammakkal – Syriacist and expert in Garshuni Malayalam.

=== Literature and writing ===
==== Poets ====
- Aimee Nezhukumatathil – poet and essayist
- Meena Alexander – poet, scholar, and writer
- Mahakavi K.V. Simon – poet
- Curien Kaniamparambil – Syriacist and poet
- P. C. Devassia – author, literary translator poet, and composer of Christian poetry in Sanskrit
- M. E. Cherian, poet and hymnist
- Mathew Ulakamthara – poet and author of epic Christu Gadha.

==== Writers ====
- Abraham Verghese – author and physician
- Arundhati Roy – writer, awarded the Booker Prize in 1997 for The God of Small Things; also essayist and activist
- Archdeacon K. Koshy (1825–1899) – author of Pulleli Kunju (1882); the first novellike original work on a local theme, in Malayalam, and several other books
- Archdeacon Oommen Mammen (1830–1904) – Malayalam litterateur and author of eighteen books
- George Menachery – historian, editor of The St. Thomas Christian Encyclopaedia of India, editor of The Indian Church History Classics (The Nazranies)
- Mridula Koshy
- M. Thomas Mathew
- M. P. Paul – literary critic
- P. C. Devassia (1906–2006) – Sanskrit scholar and poet who won the Sahitya Akademi Award (1980) for Sanskrit for his poem "Kristubhagavatam"
- Paul Zacharia – writer
- Manu Joseph – journalist and writer
- Sarah Joseph – writer, Novelist, Sahitya Academy winner
- Benyamin (writer) – Novelist, writer, Kerala Sahitya Academy winner
- George Onakkoor
- Jose Panachippuram (1951–)
- Joy J. Kaimaparamban (1939–
- Kakkanadan (1935–)
- Lajo Jose
- Sarah Thankam Mathews – novelist
- Mira Jacob – novelist
- Tania James – novelist
- Muttathu Varkey (1917–1989)
- P. F. Mathews (1960-)
- Ponkunnam Varkey (1911–2004)
- T. V. Varkey (1938–)

==== Travelogue ====
- Paremmakkal Thoma Kathanar – Author of the first travelogue in an Indian language (1778)

== Journalists and Political Commentators ==
- Sunnykutty Abraham – COO and Chief News Editor of Jaihind TV; political analyst
- Kandathil Varghese Mappillai (1890–1904) – Founder and first editor in chief of Malayala Manorama
- Kandathil Cherian Mappilai – second chief editor of Malayala Manorama
- K. M. Cherian (1954–1973) – third editor in chief of Malayala Manorama
- K. M. Mathew (1973–2010) – fourth editor in chief of Malayala Manorama
- Mammen Mathew (2010–present) – present chief editor of Manorama
- Reena Ninan – American television journalist working for CBS News, New York City
- Santhosh George Kulangara – entrepreneur and explorer
- Stanley George, American political analyst and strategist

== Film and media ==
=== Models ===
- Eden Kuriakose
- Nafisa Joseph
- Serin George

=== Actresses ===
- Aima Rosmy Sebastian
- Ann Augustine
- Amala Paul
- Anna Ben
- Anna Reshma Rajan
- Annie
- Anju Kurian
- Anu Emmanuel
- Anu Joseph
- Archana Jose Kavi
- Asin Thottumkal
- Beena Anthony
- Blessy Kurian
- Catherine Tresa
- Dhanya Mary Varghese
- Esther Anil
- Hannah Reji Koshy
- Oviya (Helon Nelson)
- Honey Rose
- Gopika
- Grace Anthony
- Jomol
- Karthika Mathew
- Kalyani Priyadarshan
- Lissy
- Lena
- Lijomol Jose
- Liza Koshy
- Mareena Michael Kurisingal
- Malaika Arora
- Miya George
- Meenakshi Margaret Sharmili
- Meera Jasmine – National Film Award for Best Actress (2004)
- Madona
- Mithra Kurian
- Merin Philip
- Muktha George
- Nayanthara (later converted to Hinduism)
- Nivetha Thomas
- Pearly Maaney
- Philomena
- Prayaga Martin
- Priyanka Chopra
- Rajini Chandy
- Reba Monica John
- Reenu Mathews
- Samantha Akkineni
- Rosin Jolly
- Rekha (Sumathi Josephine)
- Sruthi Jose
- Sandra Thoma
- Sija Rose
- Shalini
- Shalu Kurian
- Sheela
- Sheelu Abraham
- Vinitha Koshy

=== Actors ===
- Aju Varghese
- Alummoodan
- Anish Kuruvilla
- Augastine
- Babu Antony
- Basil Joseph
- Boban Alummoodan
- Captain Raju
- Dino Morea
- Innocent
- Jacob Gregory
- John Abraham
- Joju George
- Jose
- Jude Anthany Joseph
- Kunchako Boban
- Lalu Alex
- Nivin Pauly
- Roshan Mathew
- Shine Tom Chacko
- Siju Wilson
- Tovino Thomas

=== Music ===
- Anna Katharina Valayil – playback singer
- Alex Paul – music director
- Benny Dayal – playback singer
- Berny-Ignatius – music director duo
- Dhibu Ninan Thomas – Music Composer
- Job Kurian – playback singer
- Johnson (composer) – composer
- Jose Prakash – playback singer
- K. G. Markose – playback and devotional singer
- Kim Thayil – musician and songwriter
- Mathai – former singer; finalist on season 2 of The Voice
- Nikhil Mathew – playback singer
- Ouseppachan – music director
- Ranjini Jose – playback singer
- Rimi Tomy – playback singer
- Sabrina Setlur – German rapper and singer
- Stephen Devassy – pianist, music composer

== Sports ==
=== Athletics ===
- Anilda Thomas
- Anju Bobby George
- Bobby Aloysius
- Ivan Jacob
- Jincy Phillip
- Jisna Mathew
- Joseph Abraham
- K.M. Beenamol
- Mercy Kuttan
- Molly Chacko* Rosa Kutty
- Shiny Abraham
- Sini Jose
- Sinimol Paulose
- T. C. Yohannan
- Tintu Lukka

=== Badminton ===
- George Thomas
- Sanave Thomas
- V. Diju
- Shruti Kurien

=== Basketball ===
- Geethu Anna Jose (C)
- P. S. Jeena (C)

=== Cricket ===
- Abey Kuruvilla
- Basil Thampi
- Jalaj Saxena
- Sachin Baby
- Tinu Yohannan

=== Football ===
- Jo Paul Ancheri (C)
- Maymol Rocky
- Pappachen Pradeep
- Rino Anto
- Thomas Varghese (Thiruvalla Pappan)
- Victor Manjila

=== Hockey ===
- Earnest Goodsir-Cullen
- Helen Mary
- Manuel Frederick

=== Volleyball ===
- Cyril C. Valloor (C)
- Jimmy George (C)
- Tom Joseph (C)

=== Squash ===
- Sunayna Kuruvilla

=== Shooting ===
- Elizabeth Koshy

=== Swimming ===
- Sebastian Xavier

=== Olympians ===
- Thomas Varghese (Thiruvalla Pappan), Football (1948-London)
- Ivan Jacob, 400m (1952-Helenski)
- Manuel Frederick, Hockey (1972-Munich)
- T. C. Yohannan, Long Jump (1976-Montreal)
- Shiny Wilson, 800m (1984-Los Angeles, 1988-Seoul, 1992-Barcelona, 1996-Atlanta)
- Sebastian Xavier, Swimming (1996-Atlanta)
- Mercy Mathew Kuttan, 400m (1988-Seoul)
- Bobby Aloysius, High Jump (2004-Athens)
- Jincy Phillip, 4x400 relay (2000-Sydney)
- Anju Bobby George, Long Jump (2004-Athens, 2008-Beijing)
- Sini Jose, 4 × 400 m (2008-Beijing)
- Tintu Luka, 800 m (2012-London)
- Mayookha Johny, Triple jump (2012-London)
- Valiyaveetil Diju, Badminton (2012-London)
- Jinson Johnson, 800 m (2016 Rio de Janeiro)
- Jisna Mathew, 4 × 400 m (2016 Rio de Janeiro)

== Crime ==
- Jolly Joseph – suspect for the Koodathayi cyanide killings
- Sneha Anne Philip – missing person

== Gallery ==
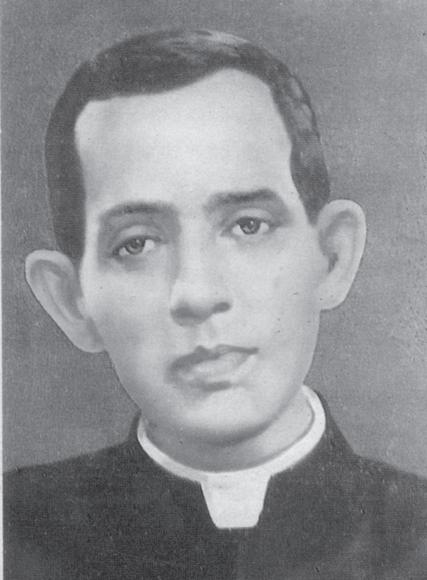
Varghese Kathanar

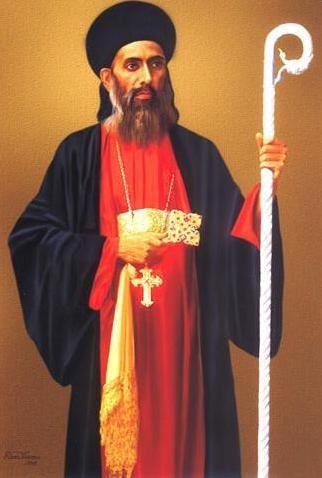
Parumala Thirumeni

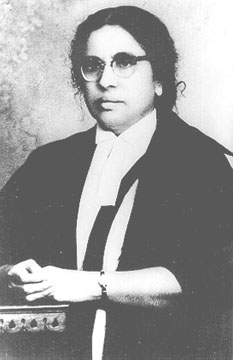
Anna Chandy
