= Viju Abraham =

Indian judge (born 1972)

Justice Viju Abraham
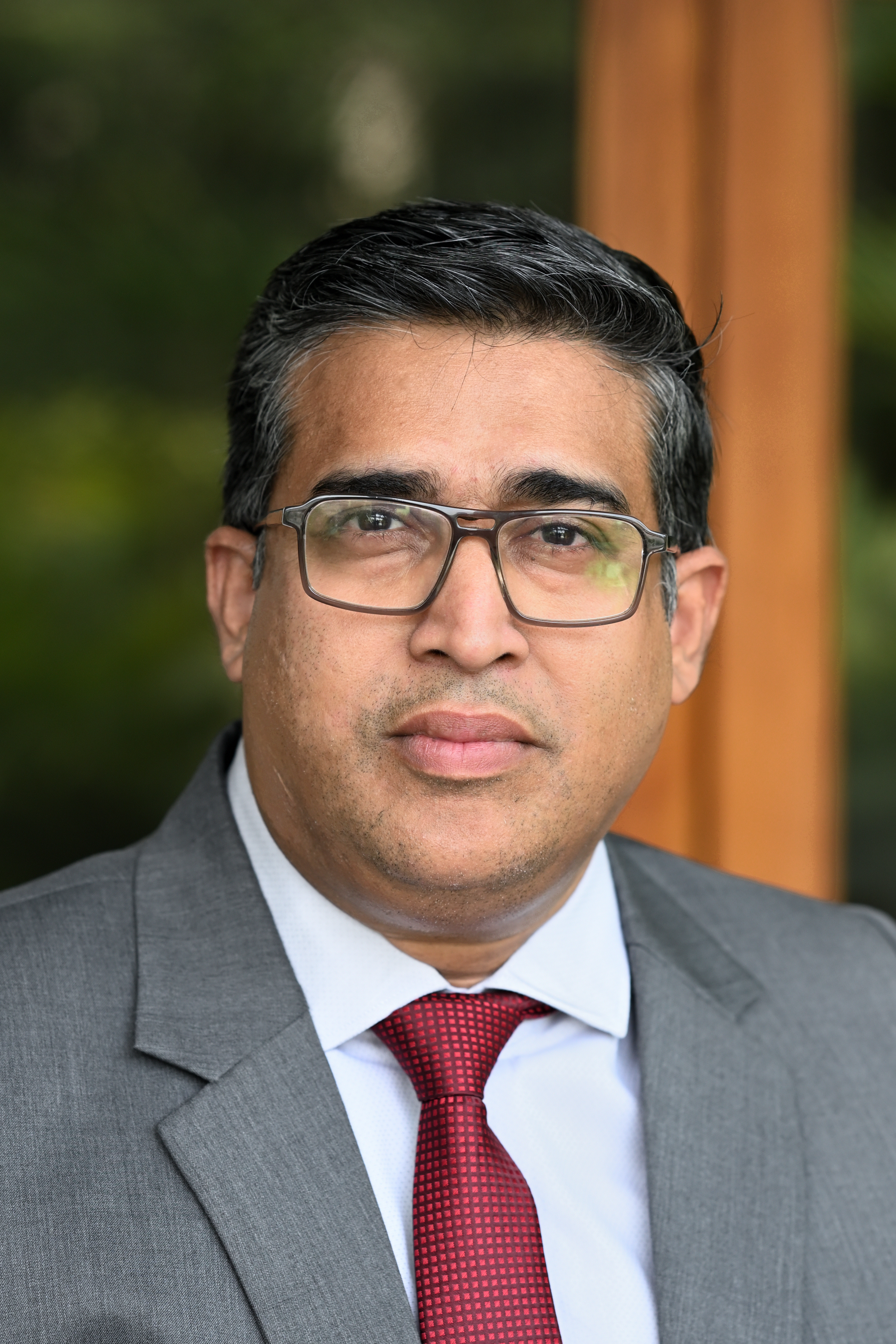

Judge of the Kerala High Court
- Incumbent
- Assumed office 13 August 2021
- Nominated by: Sharad Arvind Bobde
- Appointed by: Ram Nath Kovind

Personal details
- Born: 11 September 1972 (age 54)
- Spouse: Suni Thomas
- Education: Government Law College, Ernakulam
- Website: High Court of Kerala

Viju Abraham is an Indian judge serving on the Kerala High Court. The court of Justice Abraham was among the three paperless courts that started functioning from 1 August 2022 in Kerala High Court.

== Education and career ==
Abraham graduated in Law from Government Law College, Ernakulam and started to practice as a lawyer in 1996. He served as Government Pleader from 2004 to 2007 and as Senior Government Pleader from 2011 to 2016 in Kerala High Court. He was appointed as an additional judge of Kerala High Court on 11.08.2021 and assumed office on 13 August 2021.

== Notable rulings ==
In August 2022, bench of Justice Abraham issued strict direction to the Kerala Police and Kerala Motor Vehicle Department to conduct routine checking in public road transport services while considering an application for bail of a driver of a public transport who was booked under Narcotic Drugs and Psychotropic Substances Act, 1985 and expressed its concern about the danger to the life of the general public.
