= P. F. Mathews =

Indian writer (born 1960)

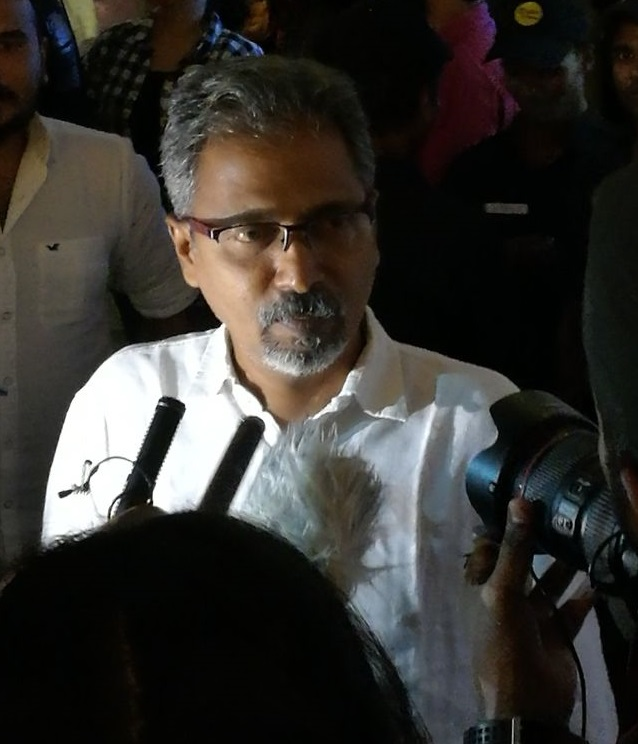
- Mathews at the premiere of Ee.Ma.Yau
- Born: 18 February 1960 (age 66); Ernakulam, Kerala State, India
- Occupations: Author, screenwriter
- Notable work: Chavunilam; Iruttil Oru Punyalan; Ee.Ma.Yau; Adiyalapretham; Kadalinte Manam; Kaanaayma; Moonga
- Spouse: Shobha
- Children: Unni Mathews, Anand Mathews
- Parent(s): Francis; Mary
- Awards: 2010 National Film Award (India) 1991 State Television Award for Best Screenplay; 1993 State Television Award for Best Screenplay; 1993 NFDC Prize for Best Screenplay; 1996 State Bank of Travancore Award for Best Novel; 1999 KCBC Award; 2019 Movie Street Film Award; 2020 Vaikom Muhammed Basheer award; 2021 Akbar Kakkattil Award; 2021 Kerala Sahitya Akademi Award for Novel; 2022 Kerala Sahitya Akademi Award for Story; 2023 News18 Kerala Malayali of the Year; 2025 G Smaraka Puraskaram; 2025 Pravasa Kairali Sahithya Puraskaram

Poovankery Francis Mathews is an Indian author of Malayalam literature and a screenplay writer in Malayalam film and Television industries. A Winner of a National Film Award for Best Screenplay and multiple State television and other literary awards including the Kerala Sahitya Akademi Award for Novel and Kerala Sahitya Akademi Award for Story, he is known for his original style of writing. Literary works such as Muzhakkam, Kadalinte Manam, Adiyalapretham, Iruttil Oru Punyalan, and Chaavunilam and screenplays such as Sararaanthal, Mikhayelinte Santhathikal, Megham, Kutty Srank and Ee.Ma.Yau are his major works.

== Early years ==
Mathews was born in a Latin Christian family on 18 February 1960 in Ernakulam, Kerala to Francis of the Poovankery house and his wife Mary. After his early schooling in Don Bosco School and St. Augustine's School, Kochi, he graduated in economics from St. Albert's College Kochi, in 1980 and secured his master's degree in Malayalam in 1982. He started writing at the age of 10 when he used to write and direct one- act plays. He took to short stories at the age of 16 and his short stories have been published in leading Malayalam publications like Malayala Manorama, Kalakaumudi, Mathrubhumi, Madhyamam and Bhashaposhini. He spent his regular career at Advocate General's Office of the High Court of Kerala from where he superannuated in 2016.

== Literary career ==
His first short story anthology, Njayarazhcha Mazha Peyyukayayirunnu (It Was Raining on Sunday), was published in 1986 by Current Books. His second work was a novel, Chaavunilam (Land of the Dead), based on the coastal life in Kochi and published in 1996 by DC Books, which won the State Bank of Travancore award for the best novel. Subsequent years produced two more short story collections, Jalakanyakayum Gandarvanum (the Mermaid and the Celestial Lover) and 2004il Alice (Alice in 2004). In 2013, a short story anthology, Kathakal (Stories), and his memoirs, Theerajeevithathinu Oru Oppees (A Requiem for the Coastal Life), were published. His second novel, Iruttil Oru Punyalan (A Saint Shrouded in Darkness), was published in 2015, and two of its chapters were published by Mathrubhumi weekly, prior to the official release of the book. The book has since been translated into Tamil, under the title, Iruttil Oru Punithan, by P. S. Ramesh.

== Film and television career ==
Mathews debuted into screen writing with a documentary film, Keep the City Clean. In 1991, he won the Kerala State Television Award for screen play, for the tele-series Sararaanthal (The Lantern), broadcast in Doordarshan. He received his second state television award for Mikhayelinte Santhathikal (Descendants of Mikhayel), in 1993. Several works followed, which included Dr. Harischandra (1994), Roses in December (1995), Charulatha (1999), Aathma (2000), Edayanum Mankidavum (2003), Megham (2004), Mantharam (2005), Aa Amma (2006), Pakalmazha (2009) and Daivathinu Swantham Devootti (2012), the last one winning State television award for the best Series. He has also won the script writing competition held nationwide by National Film Development Corporation of India, for Naattukaaryam, in 1993.

Mathews' foray into big screen was in 1986 with the story of Thanthram (the Plot), a Mammooty starrer. This was followed by Puthran (the Son), a sequel to the successful tele series, Mikhayelinte Santhathikal. The next was Kutty Srank, directed by Shaji N. Karun, which won him the National Film Award for Best Screenplay for the year 2010. Antichrist, a Lijo Jose Pellissery project, with Prithviraj, Fahadh Faasil and Indrajith in lead roles, was put on hold after initial discussions. The next project, Ee.Ma.Yau, a Lijo Jose Pellissery film, was released in May 2018 and the film received good critical reviews. Another Lijo Jose Pellissery film has also been announced, with Mamootty in the lead role.

Mathews also sat in the jury panel of the Kerala State Film Awards for the year 2016.

== Personal life ==
Mathews, a recipient of the KCBC Yuvaprathibha (Young Talent) award (1999), is married to Shobha and the couple has two sons, Unni Mathews and Anand Mathews, both of whom are part of the 'Karikku' team. He has been employed with the Advocate General's Office, Ernakulam, and has since superannuated from service.

== Awards and recognitions ==
Award	Year	Work
National Film Award for Best Screenplay	2010	Kutty Srank
Kerala State Television Award for Best Screenplay	1991	Sararaanthal
Kerala State Television Award for Best Screenplay	1993	Mikhayelinte Santhathikal
National Film Development Corporation of India Prize for Best Screenplay	1993	Naattukaaryam
State Bank of Travancore Award for Best Novel	1996	Chaavunilam
KCBC Yuvaprathibha Award	1999	General Contribution
Movie Street Film Award for Best Screenplay	2019	Ee.Ma.Yau.
Sinema Zetu International Film Festival Award for Best Screenplay	2019	Ee.Ma.Yau.
Vaikom Muhammed Basheer Award	2019	Pathimoonnu Kadalkaakkakalude Upama
Akbar Kakkattil Award	2021	Chila Pracheena Vikarangal
2020 Kerala Sahitya Akademi Award for Novel	2021	Adiyala Pretham
O V Vijayan Memorial Literary Award	2022	Adiyala Pretham
Kerala Sahitya Akademi Award for Story	2022	Muzhakkam
O. V. Vijayan Literary Award	2022	Muzhakkam
News18 Kerala Malayali of the Year	2023	Literary contributions
G Smaraka Puraskaram	2025	Overall contributions
Pravasa Kairali Sahithya Puraskaram	2025	Adiyalapretham

== Literary works ==
Work	Year	Genre / Comments
Njayarazhcha Mazha Peyyukayayirunnu	1986	Short story – Anthology
Chaavunilam	1996	Novel
Jalakanyakayum Gandarvanum	1998	Short story – Anthology
2004il Alice	2004	Short story – Anthology
27 Down	2011	Short story – Anthology
Kathakal	2013	Short story – Anthology
Theerajeevithathinu Oru Oppees	2013	Memoir
Iruttil Oru Punyalan	2015	Novel
Pathimoonnu Kadalkakkakalude Upama	2018	Short story – Anthology
Theranjedutha Kathakal	2018	Short story – Anthology
Ee Ma Yau	2019	Screenplay
Iruttil Oru Punithan	2019	Tamil translation of Iruttil Oru Punyalan
Adiyalapretham	2019	Novel
Chila Pracheena Vikarangal	2019	Short story – Anthology
Kadalinte Manam	2021	Novel
Muzhakkam	2021	Short story – anthology
Moonga	2024	Short story – anthology
Kanayma	2024	Novel
Ochukalude Kaloppu	2025	Memoirs

== Tele-series and Documentaries ==
Work	Genre	Director	Year
Keep the City Clean	Documentary	Jude Attipetty	1981
Sararaanthal	Tele-series	Jude Attipetty	1991
Mikhayelinte Santhathikal	Tele-series	Jude Attipetty	1993
Dr. Harischandra	Tele-series	Jude Attipetty	1994
Roses in December	Tele-series	Jude Attipetty	1995
Charulatha	Tele-series	Prashanth	1999
Aathma	Tele-series	Mohan Kupleri	2000
Edayanum Mankidavum	Tele-series	Jude Attipetty	2003
Megham	Tele-series	Saji Surendran	2004
Mandaram	Tele-series	Saji Surendran	2005
Aa Amma	Tele-series	Kiran	2006
Pakalmazha	Tele-series	Gireesh Konni	2009
Daivathinu Swantham Devootti	Tele-series	Madhupal	2011
Kali Gandaki	Tele-series	Madhupal	2017

== Filmography ==
Year	Work	Contribution	Notes
1986	Thanthram	Story	
1995	Puthran	Screenplay	
2002	Savithriyude Aranjanam	Screenplay	
2009	Kutty Srank	Screenplay	Won:National Film Award for Best Screenplay
2017	Crossroad	Screenplay	Anthology film; Segment-Oru Rathriyude Kooli
2018	Ee.Ma.Yau	Screenplay	
2019	A for Apple	Story	
2019	Athiran	Screenplay	

== See also ==
- List of Indian writers
