= T. Ramachandran =

T. Ramachandran may refer to:

- T. Ramachandran (writer) (1944–2000), Indian author
- T. Ramachandran (CPI politician), politician with the Communist Party of India
- T. Ramachandran (INC politician), politician with the Indian National Congress
