= Mary Joseph (disambiguation) =

Disambiguation name page

Mary Joseph is a feminine given name.

Notable people with the name include:

- Mary Joseph (born 1962) is an Indian judge.
- Mary Joseph Butler (1641–1723), Irish abbess
- Mary Joseph Rogers (1882–1955), American Roman Catholic nun
