= St. Albert's College =

Liberal arts college in Kochi, India

Coordinates: 9.986°N 76.279°E

St. Albert's College (Autonomous), Kochi, Ernakulam
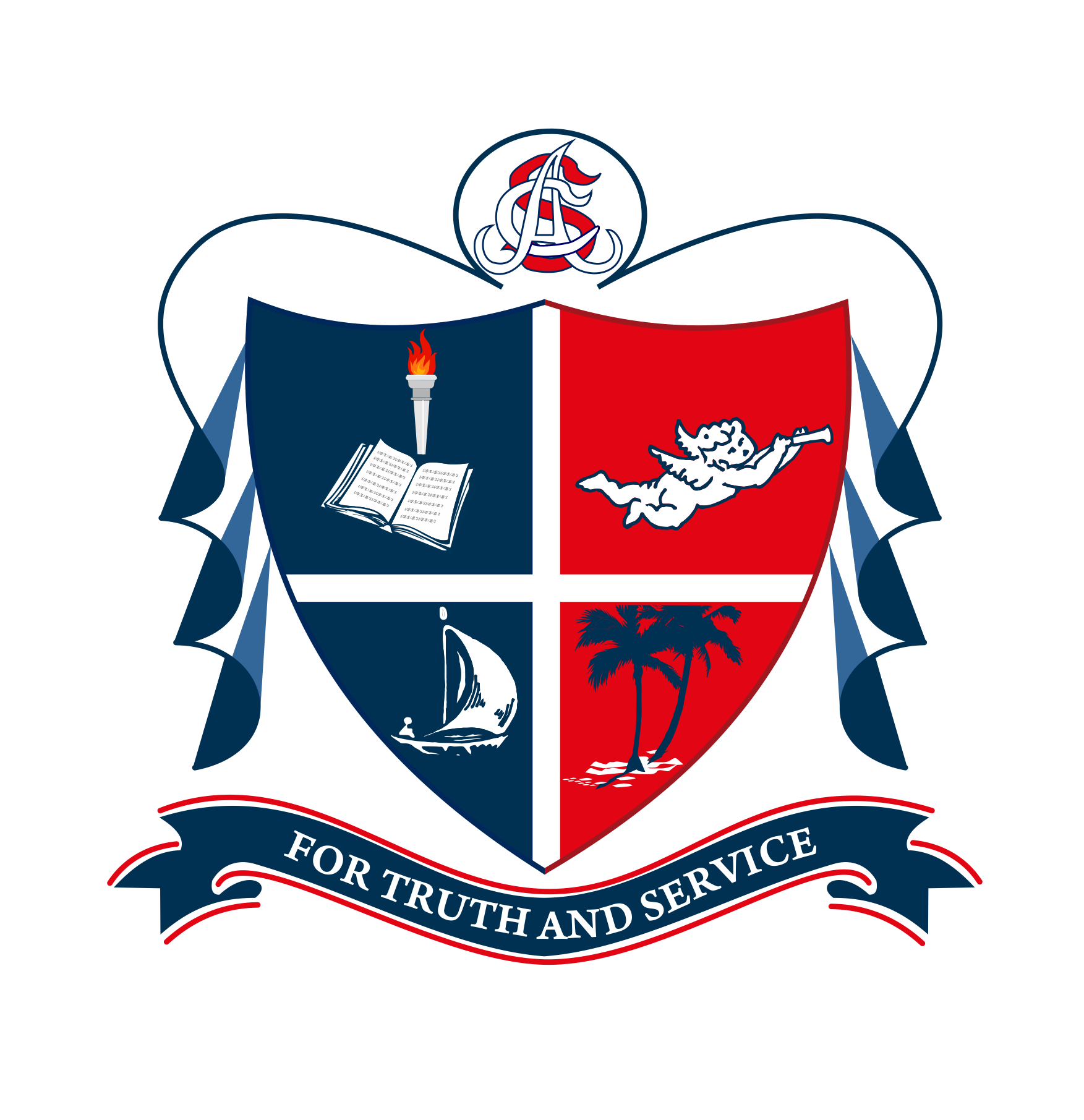
- Motto: For Truth and Service
- Type: Education
- Established: 16 July 1946
- Affiliations: Mahatma Gandhi University, Kottayam
- Religious affiliation: Archdiocese of Verapoly
- Chairman: Rev. Dr. Antony Thoppil
- Principal: Dr. Joseph Justin Rebello
- Undergraduates: 3800
- Postgraduates: 400
- Doctoral students: 25
- Other students: 1,200
- Location: Kochi, Kerala, India
- Campus: 13.63 acres (5.52 ha)
- Website: alberts.edu.in

St. Albert's College is an autonomous liberal arts college located at Kochi, India. It has twenty-three degree courses, twelve postgraduate courses and seven research centres. The National Assessment and Accreditation Council (NAAC) has accredited the college at the "A" level with an aggregate score of 3.24. St. Albert's College (Autonomous) was ranked as one among the best hundred autonomous colleges in India.

== History ==
St. Albert's College gate

The college was founded by late Dr. Joseph Attippetty, the first Indian Archbishop of the Archdiocese of Verapoly. St. Albert's College has been granted autonomous status in 2016 by the UGC. Servant of God Archbishop Joseph Attippetty started a new college at Ernakulam, then the capital of the former State of Cochin. In 1946 the authorized setting up a second grade college, which began functioning on 16 July 1946, in the old St. Albert's High School building, situated in front of the present college campus. Now the college is under the patronage of Most Rev. Dr. Joseph Kalathiparambil, Metropolitan Archbishop of Verapoly.

== Integrated Five Year (UG+PG) Programmes (1) ==
Integrated M.Sc. Programme in Basic Science - Statistics - 8 Semesters (Afternoon Batch)

== Undergraduate Programmes (30) ==
Commerce (5)

- B.Com. Taxation (Bachelor of Commerce) - 6 semesters - Aided (Forenoon Batch)
- B.Com. Computer Application (Bachelor of Commerce) - 6 semesters - Self Finance (Forenoon Batch)
- B.Com. Cooperation (Bachelor of Commerce) - 6 semesters - Self Finance (Afternoon Batch)
- B.Com. Finance and Taxation (Bachelor of Commerce) - 6 semesters - Self Finance (Afternoon Batch)
- B.Voc. (Bachelor of Vocation) Professional Accounting and Taxation - 6 semesters - Self Finance (Afternoon Batch)

Computer Science (2)

- B.Sc. Computer Science (Bachelor of Science) - 6 semesters - Self Finance (Forenoon Batch)
- B.Voc. Software Development (Bachelor of Vocation)- 6 semesters - Self Finance (Afternoon Batch)

Languages (2)

- B.A. English Literature (Bachelor of Arts) - 6 semesters (Forenoon Batch)
- B.A. English Triple Main - 6 semesters - Self Finance (Afternoon Batch)

Life Science (6)

- B.Sc. Botany (Bachelor of Science) - 6 semesters - Aided (Forenoon Batch)
- B.Sc. Zoology (Bachelor of Science) - 6 semesters - Aided (Forenoon Batch)
- B.Sc. Aquaculture (Bachelor of Science) - 6 semesters - Aided (Forenoon Batch)
- B.Sc. Industrial Fisheries (Bachelor of Science) - 6 semesters - Self Finance (Forenoon Batch)
- B.Sc. Commercial Aquaculture (Bachelor of Science) - 6 semesters - Self Finance (Afternoon Batch)
- B.Voc. Fish Post Harvest Technology and Management (Bachelor of Vocation)- 6 semesters - Self Finance (Afternoon Batch)

Management (5)

- B.B.A. (Bachelor of Business Administration) - 6 semesters - Self Finance (Forenoon Batch)
- B.B.M. (Bachelor of Business Administration) - 6 semesters - Self Finance (Afternoon Batch)
- B.Voc. Logistics Management (Bachelor of Vocation) - 6 semesters - Self Finance (Forenoon Batch)
- B.Voc. Retail Management (Bachelor of Vocation) - 6 semesters - Self Finance (Afternoon Batch)
- B.Voc. Travel & Tourism (Bachelor of Vocation) - 6 semesters - Self Finance (Afternoon Batch)

Physical Science (5)

- B.Sc. Physics (Bachelor of Science) - 6 semesters - Aided (Forenoon Batch)
- B.Sc. Chemistry (Bachelor of Science) - 6 semesters - Aided (Forenoon Batch)
- B.Sc. Vocational Chemistry (Bachelor of Science) - 6 semesters - Aided (Forenoon Batch)
- B.Sc. Mathematics (Bachelor of Science) - 6 semesters - Aided (Forenoon Batch)
- B.Voc. Renewable Energy (Bachelor of Vocation)- 6 semesters - Self Finance (Forenoon Batch)

Physical Education (2)

- B.Voc. Fitness Management (Bachelor of Vocation) - 6 semesters - Self Finance (Afternoon Batch)
- B.Voc. Sports Nutrition and Physiotherapy (Bachelor of Vocation) - 6 semesters - Self Finance (Afternoon Batch)

Social Science (3)

- B.A. Economics (Bachelor of Arts) - 6 semesters - Aided (Forenoon Batch)
- B.Voc. Journalism and Mass communication (Bachelor of Vocation) - 6 semesters - Self Finance (Afternoon Batch)
- B.Voc. Medical and Psychological Social Work (Bachelor of Vocation) - 6 semesters - Self Finance (Afternoon Batch)

== Postgraduate Programmes (16) ==
Commerce (2)

- M.Com. (Master of Commerce with specialization in Financial Management) - 4 semesters - Aided (Forenoon Batch)
- M.Com. (Master of Commerce with specialization in Financial Management) - 4 semesters - Self Finance (Afternoon Batch)

Computer Science (1)

- M.Sc. Computer Science (Master of Science) - 4 semesters - Self Finance (Forenoon Batch)

Language (1)

- M.A. in English Language and Literature (Master of Arts) - 4 semesters - Self Finance (Forenoon Batch)

Life Science (3)

- M.Sc. in botany with specialization in Plant Biotechnology (Master of Science) - 4 semesters- Aided (Forenoon Batch)
- M.Sc. in zoology with specialization in Medical Microbiology (Master of Science) - 4 semesters - Self Finance (Forenoon Batch)
- M.Sc. in Applied Fisheries and Aquaculture (Master of Science) - 4 semesters - Self Finance (Forenoon Batch)

Management (2)

- M.B.A (Master of Business Administration) specializations- Finance Management, Human Resource, Information Technology and Marketing - 4 Semesters - Self Finance
- M.Voc. Supply Chain and Logistics Management (Master of Vocation) - 4 semesters - Self Finance (Forenoon Batch)

Physical Sciences (5)

- M.Sc. Physics with specialization in Computer Science (Master of Science) - 4 semesters - Aided (Forenoon Batch)
- M.Sc. Chemistry (Master of Science) - 4 semesters - Aided (Forenoon Batch)
- M.Sc. Mathematics with specialization in Computer Programming (Master of Science) - 4 semesters- Aided (Forenoon Batch)
- M.Sc. Space Science and Technology (Master of Science) - 4 semesters - Self Finance (Forenoon Batch)
- M.Voc. Renewable Energy Management (Master of Vocation) - 4 semesters - Self Finance (Forenoon Batch)

Social Sciences (1)

- M. A. Economics (Master of Arts) - 4 semesters - Aided (Forenoon Batch)
- M.S.W (Master of Social Work)- 4 semesters

== Research programmes (Ph.D.) (7) ==
Six of the postgraduate departments are recognized research centers. These centers offer full-time and part-time research facilities.

- Mathematics: areas of research are fuzzy subgroups, fuzzy sets and systems, fuzzy groups and group homomorphisms, and group theory. The department proudly publishes an international refereed half-yearly Research Journal "The Albertian Journal of Pure and Applied Mathematics" (TAJOPAM).
- Commerce: the first Ph.D. from Commerce faculty of the affiliating University graduated from this center. The faculty undertakes research projects funded by agencies like ICSSR, UGC etc. The department mainly focuses on problems related particularly to the state of Kerala and Southern States of India.
- Chemistry: Main areas of research in Chemistry Department are Polymer Chemistry and Technology, Environmental Studies and issues relevant to the city of Kochi, the industrial capital of Kerala. Members of faculty have attracted project funds from various agencies, augmenting infrastructure for research. The faculty has several publications in reputed national and international research journals.
- Botany: The department was recently recognized as a research department. Research projects are carried out in the department. Facilities and expertise is available to carry out research in the field of Physiology, Environmental Biology and Plant tissue culture. The faculties has publication is many national and international journals.
- Zoology: The department has facilities for research leading to Ph.D. in areas of Microbiology, Biochemistry and Pollution studies. Presently the department has four research guides who are also involved in projects funded by UGC. The departments also intends to take up collaborative research projects.
- Aquaculture: The department is recognised as research department in 2016. Department have the supporting facilities to pursue research in a wide area like aquaculture, nutrition, ecology, hydro-biology, fresh water fish conservation, socio-economics of fishing communities, resource mapping, EIA etc. The department has running projects with many international agencies like CEPF, PADI, New England Aquarium etc. Department also promotes collaborative research programmes with foreign Universities.

== Notable alumni ==
Judiciary

- Justice K. T. Thomas
- Justice Sunil Thomas
- Justice P. V. Balakrishnan
- K. P. Dandapani

Religion

- Daniel Acharuparambil Late Archbishop of Verapoly
- Francis Kallarackal Archbishop Emeritus of Verapoly
- Francis Assisi Chullikatt Archbishop

Politics

- A.C. Jose Former Speaker, Kerala Legislative Assembly, MLA and MP
- Dominic Presentation Former State Minister and MLA
- Simon Britto Rodrigues Former MLA
- Tony Chammani, Former Mayor, Kochi Corporation

Arts, Literature and Film

- Cochin Haneefa
- Bhadran (director)
- P. F. Mathews
- T. Ramachandran
- Vaisakhan
- Dharmajan Bolgatty
- Bijibal
- Jude Attipetty
