= B. Sudheendra Kumar =

Judge of Kerala High court

Hon'ble Justice B. Sudheendra Kumar

Judge Kerala High Court
- In office 10 April 2015 – 31 May 2021
- Nominated by: Rajendra Mal Lodha
- Appointed by: Pranab Mukherjee

Personal details
- Born: 31 May 1959 (age 67)
- Citizenship: Indian
- Website: High Court of Kerala

Bhaskaran Pillai Sudheendra Kumar (born 31 May 1959) is a retired judge of the Kerala High Court, the highest court in the Indian state of Kerala and in the Union Territory of Lakshadweep.

== Education and career ==
Kumar obtained a law degree from Government Law College, Ernakulam and completed post graduation in Law from Mahatma Gandhi University, Kerala. Kumar enrolled as an Advocate in 1989. He joined Kerala Judicial Service 2001 as District and Sessions Judge and served as Additional District Judge-II, Thiruvananthapuram, Enquiry Commissioner and Special Judge (Vigilance), Calicut, Registrar, Supreme Court of India, New Delhi, Additional District and Sessions Judge, Kasaragod and Calicut, Registrar, Railway Claims Tribunal, New Delhi and as District & Sessions Judge, Thiruvananthapuram and Thrissur. On 10 April 2015 he was appointed as additional judge of Kerala High Court and became permanent from 5 April 2017.
