= Murali Purushothaman =

High Court judge in India

Justice Murali Purushothaman

Judge of the Kerala High Court
- Incumbent
- Assumed office 25 February 2021
- Nominated by: Sharad Arvind Bobde
- Appointed by: Ram Nath Kovind

Personal details
- Born: 31 July 1967 (age 59) India
- Education: Maharajas Government Law College, Ernakulam
- Website: High Court of Kerala

Murali Purushothaman is an Indian judge who is presently serving as a judge of Kerala High Court, the highest court in the Indian state of Kerala and in the Union Territory of Lakshadweep. The High Court is headquartered at Ernakulam, Kochi

== Career ==
After obtaining law degree from Government Law College, Ernakulam, Purushothaman enrolled as Advocate on 09.03.1991 and started practicing in Constitutional law and Service laws. During his practice, he served as Government Pleader in the High Court of Kerala from 13.03.2001 to 06.08.2001, Standing Counsel for the Kerala State Election Commission from 2000 and the Election Commission of India from 2004 till elevation as Judge, Standing Counsel for the State Co-operative Election Commission in 2002, Standing Counsel for the Delimitation Commission and Counsel for the Admission Supervisory Committee and Fee Regulatory Committee for Self Financing Professional Colleges and Institutions from 2007 to 2011. He was elevated as an additional judge of the Kerala High Court on 25.02.2021 and became permanent judge from 06.06.2022.
