= Porinju Veliyath =

Indian investor and fund manager (born 1962)

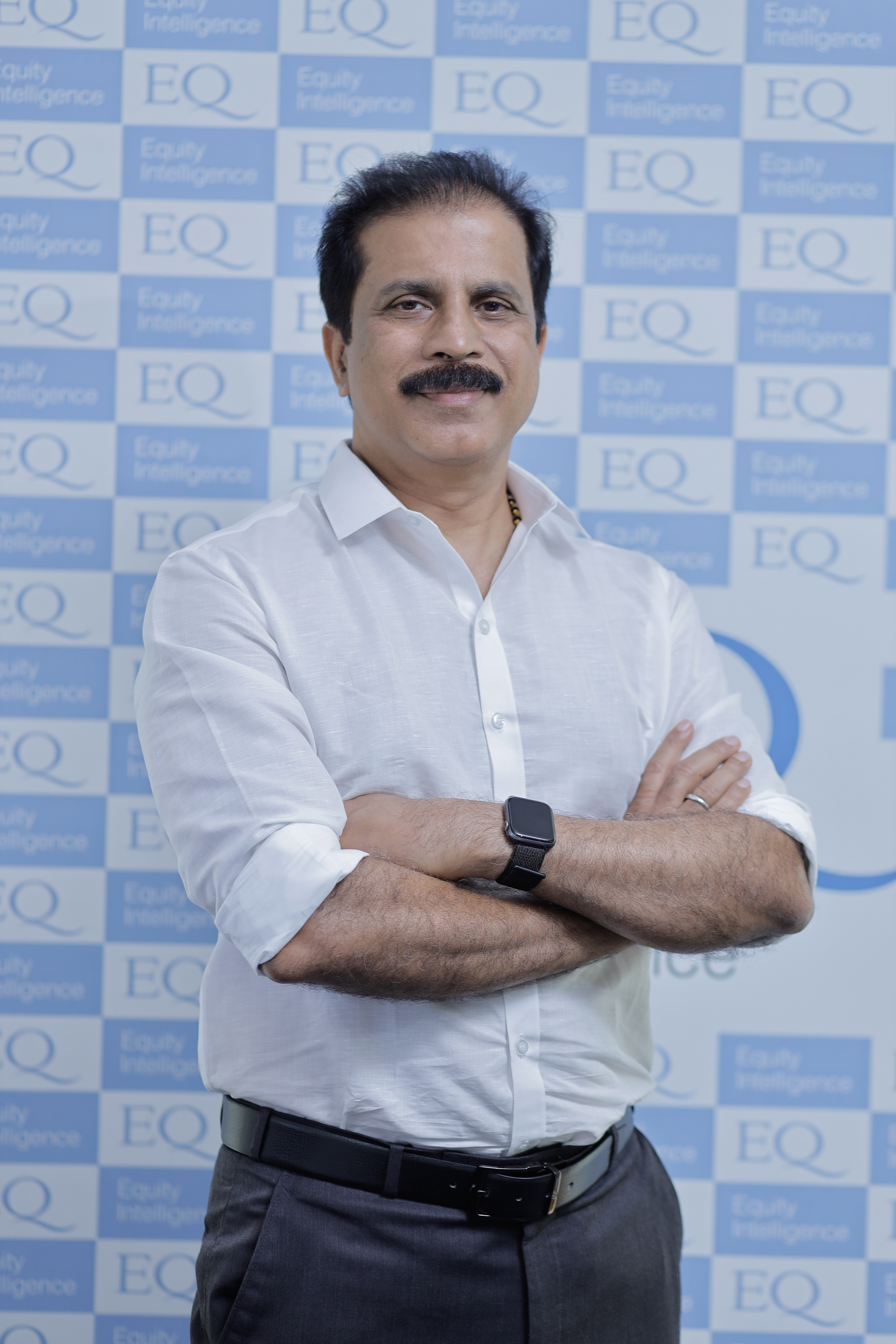
- Born: 6 June 1962 (age 64); Chalakudy, Thrissur, Kerala, India
- Other name: Francis
- Education: Government Law College, Ernakulam (LLB)
- Occupation: Fund manager
- Spouse: Litty Porinju
- Children: 3

Porinju Veliyath (born 6 June 1962) is an Indian investor and fund manager. He manages his own portfolio and the portfolios of investors in his fund management firm Equity Intelligence India Private Limited. He has been called a small-cap czar by The Economic Times.

== Early life ==
Porinju was born in a lower-middle-class family in Chalakudy village, Thrissur near to Kochi city and Athirappilly Falls.

== Career ==
Porinju Veliyath started his career in Mumbai as a floor trader with Kotak Securities in 1990. Later he joined Parag Parikh Securities in 1994 where he worked as research analyst and fund manager until 1999, when he moved back to Kochi. In 2002, he founded Equity Intelligence, a fund management firm focused on Value Investing in Indian Equites.

He is also a director with Arya Vaidya Pharmacy, which with Hindustan Unilever Limited (HUL) has created a range of Ayurvedic personal care products under the 'Lever Ayush' brand.

Porinju Veliyath expresses his views and ideas on Value Investing and opines on current affairs actively on Twitter and has over 1,000,000 followers.

== Books ==
- Ohariyiloode Engane Nettam Koyyam (Complete step-by-step guide to share market and investing) - 2008 by Dhanam Publications

== Personal life ==
He has 3 children, Shilpa, Joshua and Sunny Porinju.
