= Jude Attipetty =

Indian film director

- Born: 1 September 1959 (age 67); Kochi, Kerala, India
- Education: St. Albert's HSS, Ernakulam; St. Albert's College
- Occupations: Film director; Media professional
- Years active: Since 1981
- Awards: 1991 Kerala State Television Award for direction; 1993 Kerala State Television Award for direction

Jude Attipetty is an Indian director of Malayalam cinema and television. He is the head of programs at Mazhavil Manorama and is the director of award-winning tele-series such as Sararanthal and Mikhayelinte Santhathikal. He has also received the Kerala State Television Award for direction for his series, Avasthantharangal.

== Biography ==
Born in Kochi, the business capital of the south Indian state of Kerala, Jude Attipetty started his career by making a documentary, Keep the City Clean, for the Corporation of Kochi in 1981. Ten years later, he directed his first Malayalam tele-series, Sararanthal, (Note: Madhupal was the assistant director of the series) which was aired on Doordarshan, which also brought him his first state award for direction. It was followed by Mikhayelinte Santhathikal (1993), the debut series of Biju Menon, which again won the state award for best direction. The next series was Dr. Harischandra in 1994, and he made his film debut the same year with Puthran. The film was also the debut film of Biju Menon. His next film was Mercara (1999), before which he also made a TV series, Roses in December in 1995. In 2001, he made another tele-series, Avasthantharangal, based on his earlier series, Mikhayelinte Santhathikal.

Attipetty made his first videofilm in 2002, Parayan Baki Vachathu, which was an official entry at the Second International Video Festival (IV Fest) held on 25 March 2003 at Thiruvananthapuram. The latest of his tele-series was Edayanum Mankidavum, telecast in 2003. He resides in Kochi and is associated with Mazhavil Manorama, heading its content development section as the chief of programs.

== Awards ==
Year	Award	Category	Film
1991	Kerala State Television Award	Best series	Sararanthal
1993	Kerala State Television Award	Best series	Mikhayelinte Santhathikal
2001	Kerala State Television Award	Best director	Avasthantharangal

== Oeuvre ==
Work	Genre	Year
Keep the City Clean	Documentary	1981
Sararaanthal	Tele-series	1991
Mikhayelinte Santhathikal	Tele-series	1993
Dr. Harischandra	Tele-series	1994
Puthran	Film	1994
Roses in December	Tele-series	1995
Mercara	Film	1999
Avasthantharangal	Tele-series	2001
Parayan Baki Vachathu	Video film	2002
Edayanum Mankidavum	Tele-series	2003

== See also ==
- Bobby–Sanjay
- Abhirami
- P. F. Mathews
