= Sunny Kurian =

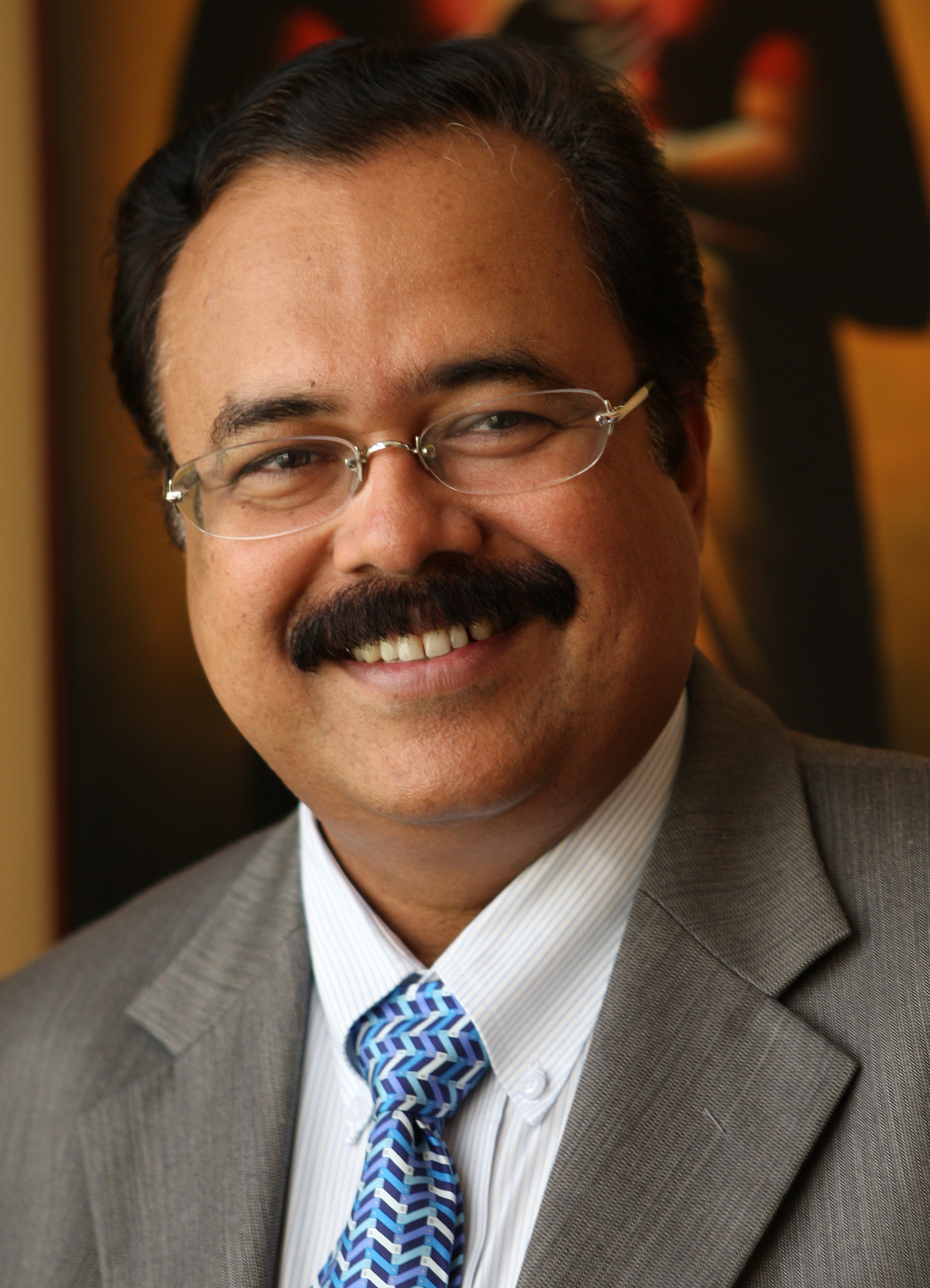
- Born: Goa, India
- Occupation: Pediatrician
- Known for: Pediatrics
- Spouse: Meera Kurian
- Children: 2 children
- Awards: Kerala State Business Excellence Award; Sharjah Economic Excellence Award; Sharjah Police Appreciation Award

Sunny Kurian is a Sharjah-based Indian-born pediatrician and the founder president of the UAE wing of the Indian Academy of Pediatrics (IAP). He is the founder trustee of the Indian Business and Professional Council (IBPC) and the chairman of Dr. Sunny's Group which he established in Sharjah in 1990.

== Biography ==
Sunny Kurian was born in the Indian state of Goa, then a Union Territory, in a Malayali family settled there. His medical education was at the J. J. M. Medical College, Davangere under Mysore University, from where he secured his master's degree (MD) in pediatrics. He moved to Sharjah in the United Arab Emirates in 1989 and a year later, established his own medical practice under the name, Dr. Sunny's Clinic. The centre slowly grew to become a business conglomerate, Dr. Sunny's Healthcare Group, with six multispecialty medical centres and business interests in pharmaceuticals, opticals and education.

Kurian, holder of a higher degree in adolescent medicine (PGDAP), is a founder trustee of the Indian Business and Professional Council (IBPC) and holds the position of its vice chairman. He is a founder of the Association of Kerala Medical Graduates (AKMG), an affiliate association of IBPC involved in charitable and educational projects, of which he served as the first secretary general and is the president of its Sharjah chapter. His contribution is reported behind the establishment of the United Arab Emirates branch of the Indian Academy of Pediatrics in 2011, the first branch of the academy outside India. He also sits on the board of trustees of the India Trade and Exhibitions Centre, Middle East (ITEC).

In 2015, The Sunny Healthcare group was acquired by Abu Dhabi based NMC Health group for US$64 million. Subsequent to acquisition, NMC Health renamed The Sunny Healthcare group as NMC Sunny.

Sunny Kurian, a known sports enthusiast involved in promoting local sporting events such as Berry Hills Indian Basketball League and Dr Sunny's Medical Centre AKCC cricket tournament, is married to his former classmate at Davangere, Meera Kurian, a consultant physician. The couple has two daughters and the family lives in Sharjah.

== Awards and honours ==
- Kerala State Business Excellence Award (Global Achievers category) - 2014
- Sharjah Economic Excellence Award - 2008
- Sharjah Economic Excellence Award - 2009
- Sharjah Police Appreciation Award - 2011
- Sharjah Police Appreciation Award - 2012
- Sharjah Economic Excellence Award - 2024

Kurian was ranked 70 among the Top 100 Indian Leaders in the UAE by the Forbes Middle East in 2014. He featured in the Forbes annual lists three times more, first in the Top 100 Healthcare Leaders in the Middle East list in 2024 followed by Top 50 Healthcare Leaders 2025 Founders & Shareholders list in 2025 and 2026. Arabian Business, a Dubai based business magazine rated him in 2014 as the 39th richest Indian in the United Arab Emirates.

== See also ==
- Indian Academy of Pediatrics
