= Narayana Pisharadi R =

Judge of the Kerala High Court in the Union Territory of Lakshadweep, India

Justice (Retd.) Narayana Pisharadi R
- The justice in 2019.

Judge of Kerala High Court
- In office 30 November 2017 – 25 December 2021

Registrar (Vigilance), Kerala High Court
- In office 4 July 2016 – 30 November 2017

Personal details
- Born: 26 December 1959 (age 66) North Paravur, Kerala, India
- Citizenship: Indian
- Education: Sree Narayana High School, North Paravur; Union Christian College, Aluva; Government Law College, Ernakulam
- Website: High Court of Kerala

Narayana Pisharadi R is a retired judge of the Kerala High Court in the Union Territory of Lakshadweep, in India.

== Early life and education ==
Pisharadi was born on 26 December 1959 at North Paravur. He has completed his schooling from Sree Narayana High School, North Paravur, graduated from Union Christian College, Aluva and obtained a law degree from Government Law College, Ernakulam.

== Career ==
He has Joined in service as High Court Assistant in 1981. Thereafter, joined Kerala Judicial Service as Judicial Magistrate of the II Class in 1986. He has served as Judicial Magistrate of the II Class and I Class, Munsiff, Sub Judge and Chief Judicial Magistrate, Judge, MACT, Additional District and Sessions Judge, District Judge at Thalassery and Ernakulam and Registrar (Vigilance), High Court of Kerala from 4 July 2016 to 30 November 2017 and was appointed as Additional Judge of the High Court on 30 November 2017. Justice Pisharadi demitted his office upon attaining the age of superannuation on 25 December 2021.
