= St. Joseph's College, Irinjalakuda =

Women's college in Kerala, India

St. Joseph's College (Autonomous), Irinjalakuda
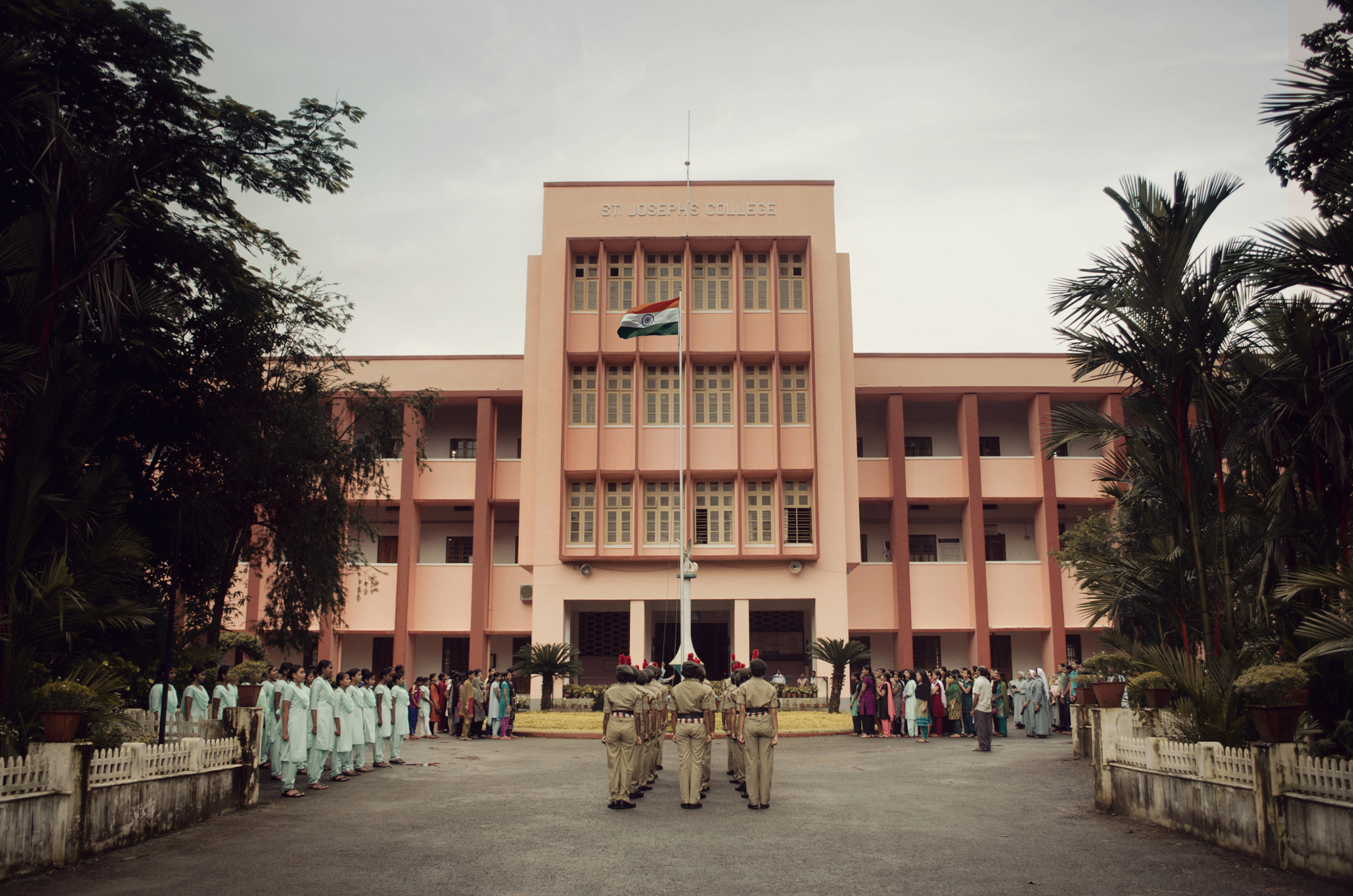
- St. Joseph's College (Autonomous), Irinjalakuda
- Motto: Life, Light and Love
- Established: 1964
- Affiliations: University of Calicut
- Principal: Dr.Sr.Siji
- Students: 3000+
- Location: Irinjalakuda, Kerala, India
- Campus: Semi-Urban

St. Joseph's College (Autonomous) Irinjalakuda is one of the women's college in the state of Kerala, India. This institution was established in 1964 and affiliated with the University of Calicut. In 1999, St. Joseph’s College, Irinjalakuda established the Department of Biotechnology, distinguished as the one and only institution in Kerala to provide a government-aided B.Sc. Biotechnology program. St.Joseph's College was the first women's college in Kerala to offer a Master's program in Mass Communication and Journalism. The institution has more than 3000+ students.

== History ==
St. Joseph’s College, Irinjalakuda is a college for women, affiliated with the University of Calicut and managed by St.Joseph Educational Society of the Congregation of Holy Family. The Congregation was founded in 1914 by the Saint Mariam Thresia, a pioneer in the field of the family apostolate, beatified on 9th April 2000.

In 1999, the Department of Biotechnology was established at St. Joseph’s College, Irinjalakuda, and since then, it has stood as a pioneering hub for scientific learning and research. Beginning with the inception of the B.Sc. Biotechnology program affiliate to University of Calicut, the department expanded its academic offerings in 2004 to include the M.Sc. General Biotechnology program as well.

== Notable alumni ==
- Justice M. R. Anitha, Judge, Kerala High Court.
- Dr. Khadija Mumtaz, Medical Practitioner, Author.
- R. Bindu, Minister for Higher Education and Social Justice in Second Vijayan ministry.
- Dr. P V Radhadevi, Director, Advanced Data Processing Research Institute, Department Of Space.
- Ms. Dhanya Babu, Adjunct Professor, Dept Of Criminal Justice, City University Of New York.
- Dr Uma Kollamparambil, Professor & Head, School Of Economics & Finance, Johannesburg.
- Ms. Usha Suresh Balaje, Performer Artist.

== See also ==
- Education in Kerala
- University of Calicut
- National Assessment and Accreditation Council
- University Grants Commission (India)
