= N. Nagaresh =

Hon'ble Justice N. Nagaresh

Judge of Kerala High Court
- Incumbent
- Assumed office 5 November 2018
- Appointed by: President of India

Assistant Solicitor General of India
- In office 2014–2018

Personal details
- Born: 1 April 1964 (age 62) Kerala
- Citizenship: Indian
- Education: Bombay University
- Alma mater: Bombay University; Government Law College, Ernakulam
- Website: High Court of Kerala

Narasimha Nagaresh is an Indian judge who is presently serving as a judge of Kerala High Court, the highest court in the Indian state of Kerala and the union territory of Lakshadweep. The high court is headquartered at Ernakulam, Kochi.

== Early life and education ==
Nagaresh was born on 1 April 1964 to Shri. S. Narasimha Naik, an advocate and former municipal chairman of Vaikom Municipal Council, and Smt.Lalita N Naik. He obtained a law degree from Bombay University in 1989 and was awarded the Dr. Kelkar Award for his treatise on the subject 'Transfer of Properties Act', in the year 1988. He did his post-graduation from Government Law College, Ernakulam, under Mahatma Gandhi University, Kerala. He also holds a bachelor's degree in science from the University of Kerala

== Career ==
Nagaresh enrolled as an advocate on 17 December 1989 and started practice at Ernakulam in the Chambers of Senior Advocate Shri. O. V. Radhakrishnan. He commenced independent practice in 1995 and he has appeared and conducted cases involving constitutional law, administrative laws, service laws, labour laws, tax laws, excise and customs laws and other matters before the High Court as well as the Ernakulam Bench of the Central Administrative Tribunal. He has served as a central government counsel from 1998 till 2004. He was engaged as a standing counsel for various public sector undertakings like Bharat Sanchar Nigam Limited, India Tourism Finance Limited, Cochin Special Economic Zone, National Council of Applied Economic Research, Mysore Paper Mills, etc. He was co-opted as a member of the Disciplinary Committee of the Bar Council of Kerala on 5 October 2008 and thereafter served as a member of the 11th Council of the Bar Council of Kerala in 2011. He served as the assistant solicitor general of India, High Court of Kerala, from 17 July 2014 to 1 November 2018. He was nominated to the General Council of the National University of Advanced Legal Studies (NUALS) in 2013. He was appointed as an additional judge of the High Court of Kerala on 5 November 2018. He was appointed as permanent judge of the High Court of Kerala with effect from 14 September 2020.

== Notable judgments ==
In Glanis vs Lazar Manjila, Nagaresh observed, "The Court has to consider the psychological hurdles that the widow will face on account of remarriage. The society is changing. The age old concept of a remarried widow cutting off all relations with the family of her ex-husband, is becoming a story of the past." and held that, while computing compensation for dependency of a widow on the death of her husband under Section 166 of the Motor Vehicles Act, her remarriage shall not be a decisive factor. He observed that the loss of dependency consequent to the death of the husband does not cease merely because the widow has remarried or became self-reliant.

While disposing a petition relating to the visibility of a party's symbol on Electronic Voting Machines (EVMs), Justice Nagaresh emphasized upon the importance of the voter being able to see the name, photograph, and symbol with clarity, which is essential for any free and fair election.

In G.Christhudas vs State of Kerala & others, Nagaresh held that "No religious community has an unbridled right to conduct pilgrimage to any place inside a Reserve Forest land. If any group of people forcibly enter any Reserve Forest Area and construct any structures unauthorisedly, such structures are liable to be removed by the Forest Authorities in accordance with law."

In a significant ruling, Nagaresh observed that the coronavirus disease (COVID-19) would fall within the ambit of "disaster" as defined under Section 2(d) of the Disaster Management Act and thus it would be open to the district authority to procure use of amenities including buildings from any authority or person even without formal requisition. In a writ petition filed by a homeopathic practitioner, Nagaresh ruled that a qualified homoeopathic physician can dispense preventive and prophylactic homoeopathic medicines for COVID-19. In Sebastian Thomas v. Secretary, Local Self Government Department, Nagaresh permitted an Indian couple stuck in Israel amid the COVID-19 pandemic to register their marriage via video conference.

In Rakhul Krishnan vs Union of India Nagaresh held that an international arrest warrant issued by itself will not suffice to arrest and extradite an accused; and that the nationals of contracting states shall not be extradited unless there is a request made by the state concerned.

In Sujith Prasad v The Reserve Bank of India and others_{,} Nagaresh referred to Section 21(3) of the Credit Information Companies (Regulation) Act, 2005 and held that updation of CIBIL score (financial credit rating) is a borrower's statutory right and therefore, credit rating agencies are legally bound to consider objections against the rating given to a debtor.
