= V. Shircy =

Judge Kerala High Court
- In office 5 October 2016 – 31 May 2022
- Appointed by: Pranab Mukherjee

Personal details
- Born: 31 May 1960 (age 66)
- Citizenship: Indian
- Website: High Court of Kerala

V. Shircy (born 31 May 1960) is a retired judge of Kerala High Court, the highest court in the Indian state of Kerala and in the Union Territory of Lakshadweep.

== Early life ==
Shircy graduated from St. Teresa's College, Ernakulam in 1981 and obtained Law Degree from Government Law College, Ernakulam.

== Career ==
Shircy enrolled as an Advocate in 1984 and started practicing in Thodupuzha. On 11 July 1988 she joined Kerala Civil Judicial Service as Munsiff at Pathanamthitta. Subsequently served as Munsiff-Magistrate at Perambra, as Sub Judge at Thrissur, Kozhikode, Kochi and Kottayam, as Chief Judicial Magistrate at Thrissur, as Judge Motor Accidents Claims Tribunal at Ottapalam, as Judge, Family Court at Kozhikode and Thrissur, as Additional District Judge at Ernakulam, Kozhikode and Thrissur, as Principal District Judge at Manjeri, Thalassery and Thiruvananthapuram and as the Chairperson of the Administrative Committee of Sree Padmanabha Swamy Temple, Thiruvananthapuram. On 5 October 2016 she was appointed as additional judge of Kerala High Court and became permanent from 16 March 2018. Justice Shircy demitted her office upon attaining the age of superannuation on 31 May 2022.
