= P. N. Ravindran =

Judge of Kerala High Court, India

Hon'ble Justice P. N. Ravindran
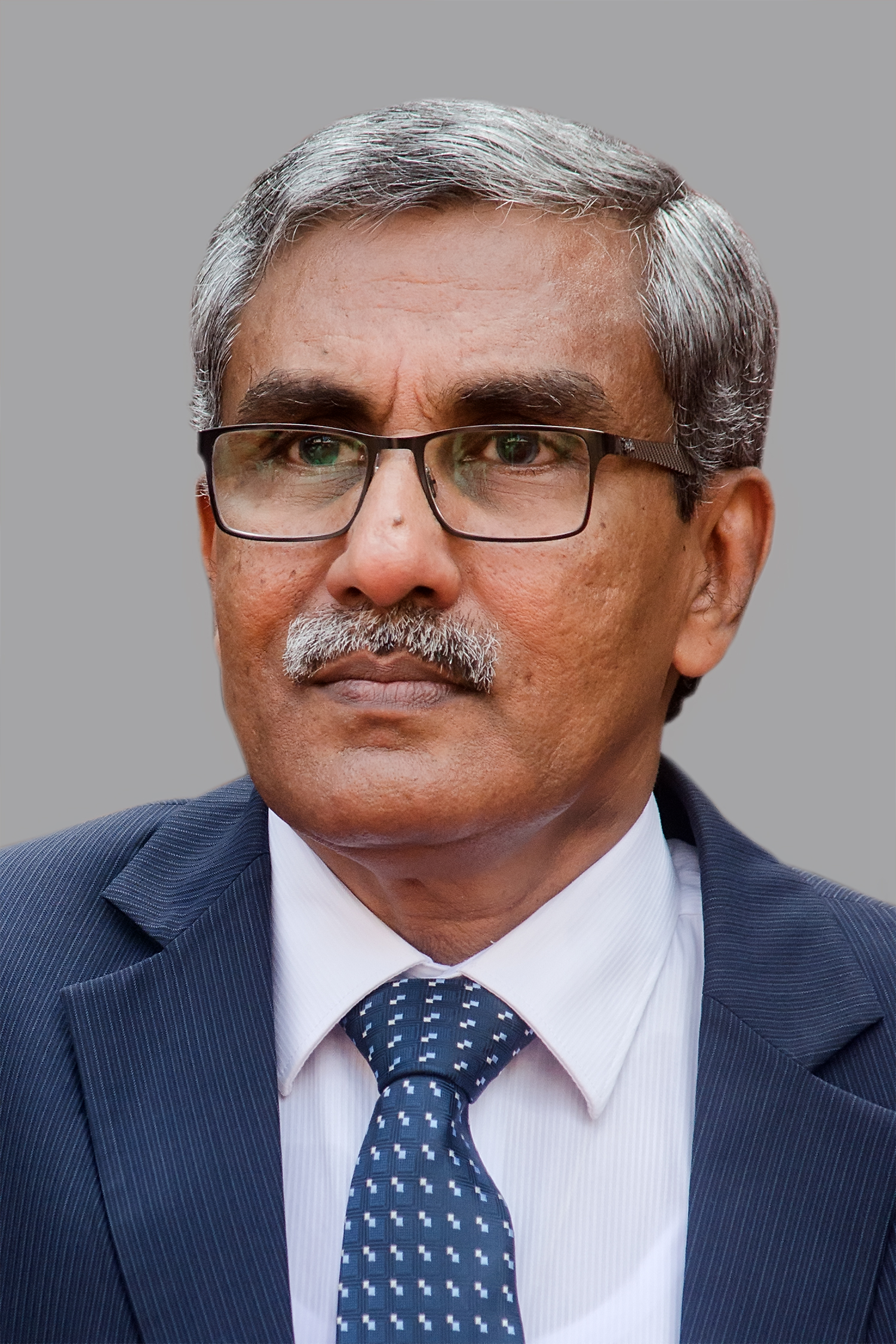

Judge of Kerala High Court
- In office 13 December 2008 – 28 May 2018

Personal details
- Born: 29 May 1956 (age 70) Alathur, Palakkad, Kerala, India
- Citizenship: Indian
- Party: BJP
- Education: Government Victoria College, Palakkad
- Website: High Court of Kerala

P. N. Ravindran (born 29 May 1956) is a former judge of Kerala High Court, the highest court in the Indian state of Kerala and in the Union Territory of Lakshadweep. The High Court of Kerala is headquartered at Ernakulam, Kochi. Justice Ravindran retired from service on 28 May 2018.

He joined Bharatiya Janata Party in March 2021 in presence of Union Finance Minister Nirmala Sitharamanin Kochi.

== Career ==
Ravindran graduated in Law from Government Law College, Ernakulam in the year 1979, enrolled in Bar Council of Kerala on 16 December 1979 and started practicing in Kerala High Court. While practicing in various branches of law, served as Additional Central Government Standing Counsel from 18.06.1998 to 21.04.1999, Legal Advisor and Standing Counsel for Guruvayur Devaswom from 201.11.2002 to 25.04.2005.

He was appointed as an additional judge of Kerala High Court on 12 December 2007 and confirmed as a permanent judge from 9 December 2009.
