= Sophy Thomas =

Indian judge

Justice Sophy Thomas

Judge of the Kerala High Court
- In office 20 October 2021 – 13 February 2025

Personal details
- Born: 13 February 1963 (age 63)
- Parents: Eluvichira Mathew Thomas (father); Elikutty Thomas (mother)
- Education: Government Law College, Ernakulam; Mahatma Gandhi University, Kerala
- Website: High Court of Kerala

Sophy Thomas (സോഫി തോമസ്; born 13 February 1963) is an Indian judge presently serving on the Kerala High Court, the highest court in the Indian state of Kerala and the union territory of Lakshadweep. The High Court is headquartered at Ernakulam, Kochi. She was the first women Registrar General in Kerala High Court.

== Education and career ==
Sophy obtained graduation in law from Government Law College, Ernakulam and post graduation from Mahatma Gandhi University, Kerala. Started her practice in trial courts at Thodupuzha and joined judicial service as Judicial Magistrate of Second Class, Mavelikkara. Thereafter, served as Judicial First Class Magistrate, Mavelikkara, Vaikom and Vadakara, as Munsiff Perumbavoor and Thrissur, as Sub Judge, Ernakuam and Muvattupuzha, as District and Sessions Judge (Special Additional Sessions Court for the trial of Marad cases), Kozhikode, as Judge of Family Court, Ettumanoor and Motor Accidents Claims Tribunal and District and Sessions Judge at Alappuzha, as District and Sessions Judge, Thrissur and as Registrar General of High Court of Kerala. She was appointed to serve as an additional judge on the High Court with effect from 20 October 2021 and became permanent from 31.07.2023. Justice Sophy demitted her office upon attaining the age of superannuation on 13 February 2025.
