= Government Law College, Ernakulam =

Law College in Kochi, Kerala, India

Coordinates: 9.975°N 76.280°E

His Highness The Maharajas Government Law College, Ernakulam
- Other name: GLC Kochi
- Former names: His Highness The Maharajas Law College, Ernakulam
- Motto: Fiat Justitia Ruat Caelum (Let justice be done though the heavens fall)
- Established: 1875; 151 years ago
- Affiliations: Mahatma Gandhi University; BCI
- Principal: Dr.Bindhu Mol, Ph.D
- Location: Kochi, Kerala, India
- Campus: Urban
- Website: https://glcekm.ac.in/

The Government Law College, Ernakulam, also known as His Highness the Maharajas Government Law College, Ernakulam is an institution for undergraduate and post-graduate legal education e in Kochi, Kerala, India. Founded in 1874, it is the first law college in kerala and is the second oldest law college in India. It is a recognised Research Centre in Law affiliated to Mahatma Gandhi University which includes research centres in Criminal Law, Medical Law and Centre for Law, Governance and Policy Studies.

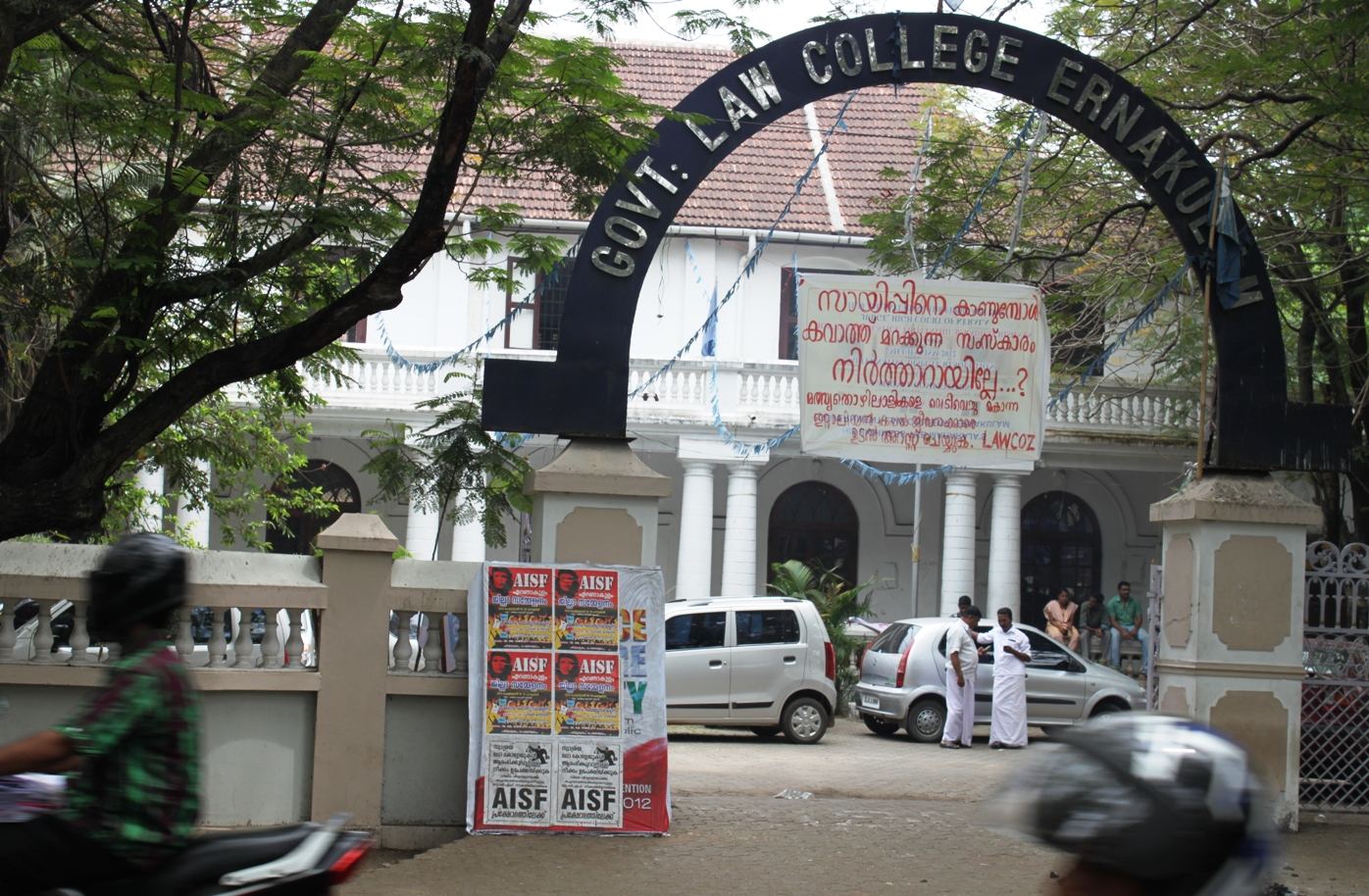

The campus is situated on the banks of Vembanad Lake, near Marine Drive and the High Court of Kerala. Blanketed by tall and rare species of trees, the campus features a mix of old and modern architecture. The college is recognised by the Bar Council of India and is affiliated with the Faculty of Law, Mahatma Gandhi University in Kottayam and is considered a reputed research centre in law.

The college’s prestigious alumni include former Chief Justice of India K. G. Balakrishnan, noted Indian actor Mammootty, former Defence Minister of India A. K. Antony, and former Chief Minister of Kerala Oommen Chandy. It is popularly known as Ernakulam Law College or Maharajas Law College.

== History ==
The college's history began in 1875 when legal education was started in Kerala by the then Maharajah of Travancore sanctioning the organisation of a law class in connection with the His Highness The Maharaja's College, Thiruvananthapuram. This was intended to enable candidates from Travancore to present themselves for the law examination of Madras University. The set-up continued till 1894, when the institution was reorganised entirely with the college being raised to the status of an independent college as His Highness the Maharajah's Law College, Thiruvananthapuram, with W.T.A. Cosby, bar-at-law (judge of the High Court of Travancore, who was appointed as professor of law in 1892) as the first principal. A complete set of rules was formulated by the government for the control and regulation of work in the college. The rules prescribed the qualification for members of the teaching staff.

The college was maintained and managed by the Maharajah of Travancore until 1909, when it was placed under the Director of the Public Instruction. In 1910, the college came under the High Court of Travancore. With the inauguration of the University of Travancore (later University of Kerala) in 1938, the college was transferred to the control of the university.

In August 1949, the college was shifted to Ernakulam to fit in with the integration of the erstwhile princely states of Travancore and Cochin and the establishment of the Travancore-Cochin High Court, and was housed in the old assembly building of Cochin state. In 1954, another college was started in Thiruvananthapuram, leaving the original college at Ernakulam. In 1983, with the establishment of Mahatma Gandhi University, the college became a constituent college of that university and is now affiliated to it.

In 1967/68, the three-year LL.B. course was started and the title of the degree of M.L. was changed to LL.M. During 1968/69, the two-year B.L. degree course was abolished. A part-time course for the three-year LL.B. started during 1968/69 but was abolished in 2002.

The college celebrated the centenary of legal education in 1975 and Golden Jubilee in 1999.

== Courses ==
=== B.Com., LL.B (Hons) ===
This is a five-year integrated law course, leading to a B.Com., LL.B (Hons). Each year consist of two semesters. The student earns the integrated B.Com. LL.B. degree after completing the tenth semester, i.e., upon successful completion of five years. This course is being introduced from the academic year 2016–17.

=== LL.B 3 Year Degree ===
This is a three-year law course, leading to the award of an honours degree. The course structure is divided into six semesters over three years. qualification degree.

=== LL.M ===
The LL.M. course enables students to develop their interests in many of the major areas of law to which they have been introduced in the LL.B. course, and also provides the opportunity to study important aspects of specialized areas of law in The duration of the course is two years. At present, the college is offering instruction in two branches of law in the LL.M degree, Criminal Law and Commercial Law.

== Campus ==
The Campus situated on the banks of Vembanad Lake and near to Marine Drive, Kochi and District Court Ernakulam. Blanketed by tall and rare species of trees, its campus features a mix of old and modern architecture. The main block of the law college is the grand old legislative hall of Cochin Legislative Council. In 1949, when the college was shifted from Trivandrum to Ernakulam, the legislative hall became the part of His Highness the Maharaja's Law College.

The college enrols over 700 students for the LL.B course and 30 students for the LL.M course.

In 2006, the government declared the campus a heritage site and offered Rs. 50,00,000 for its renovation which is still in progress. The library building includes the computer laboratory. All classrooms are equipped with microphones and speakers for better audibility. WiFi is available for the students' use.

== Library ==
The Government Law College, Ernakulam has one of the oldest law libraries in the country today. The institution has a full-fledged library which has more than 37,000 Volumes and 22 periodicals and is the oldest law library in the state of Kerala. The library has subscriptions to online journals such as Manupatra, CDJ Law Journal, SCC Online, Lexis Nexis (India), Lex Libraria and Hein Online. It also has offline databases of AIR Infotech and KLT Infotech.

== Hostels ==
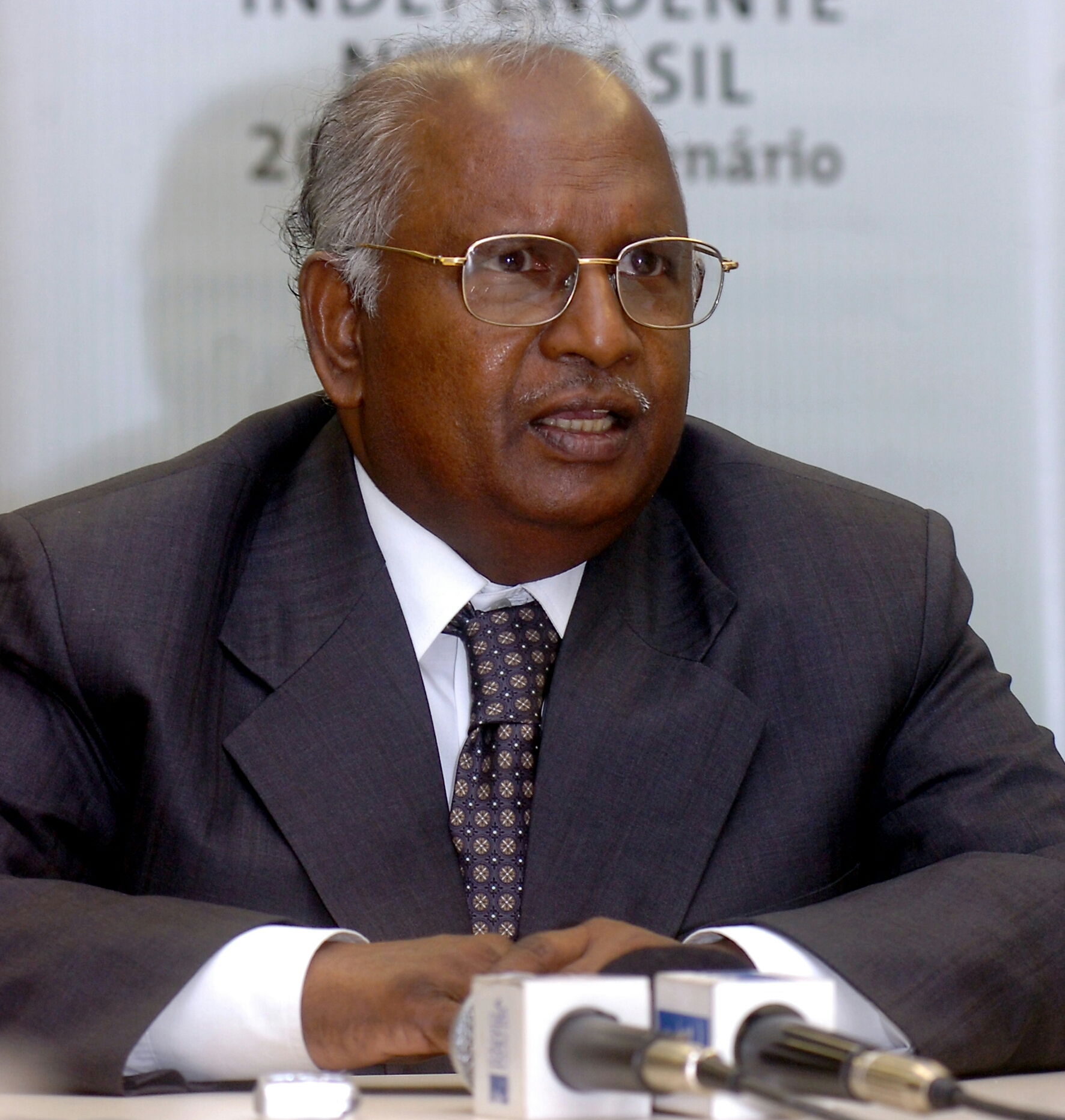
Justice K. G. Balakrishnan, Alumni of the college

Government Law College, Ernakulam has both men's and women's hostels. The men's hostel which is metaphorically named House of Lords is situated in Colombo Jn. on the rear side of the campus. It accommodates 80 students. The women's hostel is placed adjacent to the college campus where about 30 students stay.

== Notable alumni ==
=== Judiciary ===
- Justice K. G. Balakrishnan, Former Chief Justice of India
- Justice K. M. Joseph, Former Judge, Supreme Court of India
- Justice K.K. Usha, Former Chief Justice, High Court of Kerala
- Justice K. Sukumaran, Former judge Kerala & Bombay High court
- Justice J. B. Koshy, Former Chief Justice of Patna High Court & Kerala High court
- Justice Gopinath P., judge, Kerala High Court
- Justice Pius C. Kuriakose, Honorable Judge, Lokayukta
- Justice Anu Sivaraman, Judge, Karnataka High Court
- Justice Sunil Thomas, Former Judge, Kerala High Court
- Justice A.K. Jayasankaran Nambiar, Judge, Kerala High Court
- Justice B. Sudheendra Kumar, Former Judge, Kerala High Court
- Justice Babu Mathew P. Joseph, Former Judge, High Court of Kerala
- Justice P. N. Ravindran, Former Judge, High Court of Kerala
- Justice P. R. Ramachandra Menon, Former Chief Justice, High Court of Chhattisgarh
- Justice Narayana Pisharadi R, Former Judge, High Court of Kerala
- Justice Devan Ramachandran, Judge, High Court of Kerala
- Justice V. Shircy, Former Judge, High Court of Kerala
- Justice Shaji P. Chaly, Former Judge of Kerala High Court
- Justice Mary Joseph, Former Judge, High Court of Kerala
- Justice N. Nagaresh, Former Judge, High Court of Kerala
- Justice A. K. Jayasankaran Nambiar, Judge, High Court of Kerala
- Justice Bechu Kurian Thomas, Judge, High Court of Kerala
- Justice M. R. Anitha, Former Judge, High Court of Kerala
- Justice Haripal, Former Judge, High Court of Kerala
- Justice Murali Purushothaman, Judge, High Court of Kerala
- Justice Sophy Thomas, Former Judge, High Court of Kerala
- Justice Easwaran, Judge, High Court of Kerala

=== Government ===
- A K Antony, former Union Defence Minister of India and former Chief Minister of Kerala
- Oommen Chandy, former Chief Minister of Kerala
- Vayalar Ravi, former Union Cabinet Minister
- P Rajeev, Former Law Minister of Kerala and Former Member of Parliament (Rajya Sabha)
- E. Chandrasekharan Nair, senior leader of CPI, former Food and Civil Supplies Minister of Kerala
- Jose Thettayil, former Transport Minister of Kerala
- K. P. Viswanathan, former Minister for Forests & Wildlife of Kerala

=== Legislators ===
- P. K. Ittoop, Former Member of the Kerala Legislative Assembly
- Anto Antony, Member of Parliament
- A. C. Jose, former Speaker of the Kerala Legislative Assembly
- Therambil Ramakrishnan, former Speaker of Kerala Legislative Assembly
- Varkala Radhakrishnan, former MP and Speaker of Kerala Legislative Assembly
- P. T. Thomas, former member of Kerala Legislative Assembly
- Simon Britto Rodrigues, former member of the Kerala Legislative Assembly
- Thomas Kallampally, former member of the Kerala Legislative Assembly
- U. A. Latheef, member of the Kerala Legislative Assembly
- P. C. George, former member of the Kerala Legislative Assembly

=== Malayalam Film Industry ===
- Mammootty, Indian Film Actor
- Sachy (writer), Malayalam Film Industry
- Baburaj (actor), Malayalam Film Industry
- Rohini Mariam Idicula, Actress, Model

=== Others ===
- N. R. Madhava Menon, civil servant, lawyer and legal educator
- M. N. Vijayan, Kerala Sahithya Academy Award winning writer
- K. P. Dandapani, former Advocate General of Kerala
- B. Raman Pillai, criminal lawyer
- TG Mohandas, journalist
- Porinju Veliyath, naturalist, investor
- Bindu Ammini, lawyer
- A Jayashankar, lawyer, journalist
- Farha Mather, lawyer, badminton player
- Shahina K. K., Journalist, Winner International Press Freedom Award, 2023

== In popular culture ==
- Manju Warriar starring C/O Saira Banu shooting took place in Government Law College Ernakulam where the protagonist Joshua Peter where studying (Shane Nigam)
- Mamooty starring Puthan Panam shooting took place in Government Law College Ernakukam where in all the Court scenes are taken.
- In the Mammotty starrer movie Bheeshma Parvam there is a mention of the college
- The police canteen scenes for the 2023 theatrical Kannur Squad was shot in the heritage building of the college.
