= M. R. Anitha =

Indian judge

Retd. Justice M. R. Anitha

Judge of Kerala High Court
- In office 06 March 2020 – 31 May 2023
- Nominated by: Sharad Arvind Bobde
- Appointed by: Ram Nath Kovind

Personal details
- Born: 31 May 1961 (age 65) Kuzhikkattussery, Thrissur, Kerala
- Citizenship: Indian
- Parents: M.K.Raman (father); P.R.Radha (mother)
- Education: Government Law College, Ernakulam
- Website: High Court of Kerala

Mudalikulam Raman Anitha (born 31 May 1961) is a retired judge of the Kerala High Court, which is the highest court in the Indian state of Kerala and in the Union Territory of Lakshadweep. The High Court is headquartered at Ernakulam, Kochi.

== Early life and education ==
Anitha was born at Kuzhikkattussery, Thrissur to M.K.Raman and P.R.Radha. Anitha graduated from St. Joseph's College, Irinjalakuda and obtained a law degree from Government Law College, Ernakulam.

== Career ==
Anitha joined Kerala Judicial Service on 28 January, 1991. She was appointed as Additional District and Sessions Judge in 2005 at Thiruvananthapuram as Fast Track-III, served as Principal District and Sessions Judge of Wayanad and as Principal District and Sessions Judge of Kozhikode. 06 March 2020 she was appointed as additional judge of Kerala High Court. Justice Anitha demitted her office upon attaining age of superannuation on 31 May 2023.
