= Easwaran S. =

The Honourable Justice Easwaran S.

Judge of the Kerala High Court
- Incumbent
- Assumed office 22 March 2024
- Nominated by: D. Y. Chandrachud
- Appointed by: Droupadi Murmu

Personal details
- Born: 30 September 1974 (age 52) Ernakulam, Kerala
- Spouse: Akilandeswari K.K.
- Parents: E.Subramania lyer (father); Sarada Mani (mother)
- Education: Government Law College, Ernakulam; Maharaja's College, Ernakulam
- Website: High Court of Kerala

Easwaran Subramani (born 30 September 1974) is an Indian judge who is presently serving as a judge of Kerala High Court. The High Court of Kerala is the highest court in the Indian state of Kerala and in the Union Territory of Lakshadweep. The High Court of Kerala is headquartered at Ernakulam, Kochi. Easwaran was elevated as judge from the bar while he was practicing as a lawyer in Kerala High Court.

== Early life and education ==
Easwaran completed his schooling from St. Joseph's English Medium High School, Trikkakkara, Ernakulam, graduated from Maharaja's College, Ernakulam and obtained Law Degree from Government Law College, Ernakulam.

== Career ==
Easwaran enrolled as an advocate in Bar Council of Kerala in 1999 and started practice with his father, Sri.E.Subramania lyer. During his practice he mainly handled cases related to Banking Law, Insurance Law, Service matters relating to Public Institutions and cases involving Civil nature and Company Cases, Insolvency and Bankruptcy. Served as Standing Counsel for Indian Bank and Life Insurance Corporation of India and panel lawyer for State Bank of India, Sundaram BNP Home finance, Catholic Syrian Bank and South Indian Bank. On 22 March 2024, he was appointed as an additional judge of Kerala High Court and became permanent judge with effect from 4 March 2026.
