= Babu Mathew P. Joseph =

Indian judge

Hon'ble Justice Babu Mathew P. Joseph
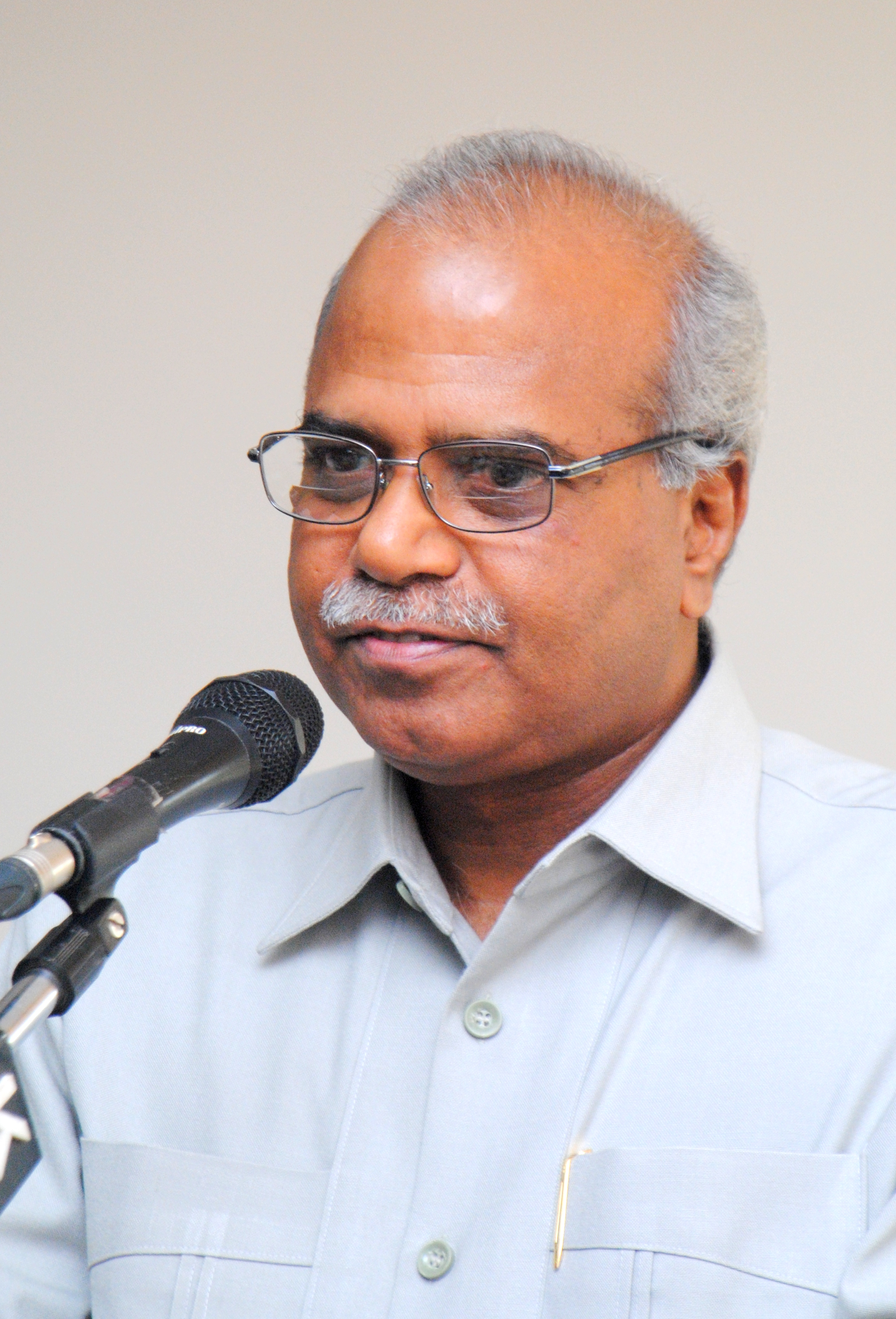

Judge Kerala High Court
- In office 18 January 2012 – 29 July 2016

Personal details
- Born: 29 July 1954 (age 71) Island of Bolghatty, Kerala, India

Babu Mathew P. Joseph (born 29 July 1954) is a former judge of Kerala High Court. He was born on the Island of Bolghatty, Mulavukad, Ernakulam, Kerala on 29 July 1954. He graduated in law from Government Law College, Ernakulam and enrolled as an Advocate on 16 December 1979. As a lawyer he was practicing in various branches of law and served as the standing council for the Kerala State Cashew Development Corporation. He was appointed as the District and Sessions Judge in 1995 and served in Pala, Kottayam, Thrissur, Kalpatta, Manjeri, Kozhikode and Mavelikkara and appointed as the judge of Kerala High Court on 18 January 2012. He is appointed as Member (Judicial) Armed Forces Tribunal, Principal Bench, Delhi after retiring from the Kerala High Court.
