= News18 Kerala =

Indian Malayalam language news channel

News18 Keralam
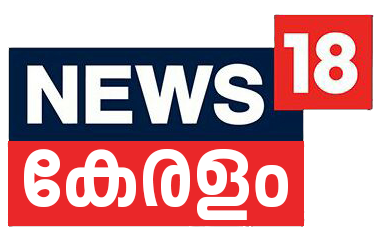
- Logo used since 2017
- Country: India
- Broadcast area: Keralam
- Headquarters: Thiruvananthapuram, Keralam, India

Programming
- Language: Malayalam
- Picture format: 576i SDTV

Ownership
- Owner: Network18 Group
- Sister channels: Network18 Group channels

History
- Launched: April 15, 2015; 11 years ago

Links
- Website: malayalam.news18.com

Availability

Streaming media
- Live Streaming: Watch Live

News18 Keralam is an Indian Malayalam language pay television news channel owned by Network18 Group. It is headquartered in Thiruvananthapuram. The launch in Keralam was part of an expansion plan of News18 franchise in Tamil Nadu, Keralam and Assam-North East. Indian Super League (ISL) Season 10 was broadcast on News18 Kerala with Malayalam commentary.

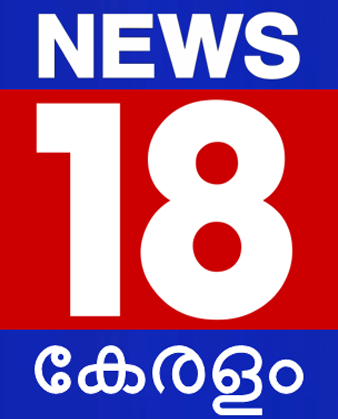
Previous News18 Keralam logo used from 2015 to 2017

== See also ==
- Network18 Group
- CNN News18
