= T. Ramachandran (writer) =

Indian writer

T. Ramachandran, (25 October 1944 – 26 July 2000), better known as T.R., his initials under which he wrote fiction, is considered a harbinger of high modernism in Malayalam.

== Early life ==
He was born in Thrippunithura and his parents were Mannur Madhathil Raman Nambiar and Kochu Madhathil Savithri Brahmani Amma. T.R. did his school education in Edappally, Kodungallur and Thrippunithura. He graduated in zoology from St. Albert's College, Kochi (old spelling: Cochin), but, did his master's degree in English Literature from Sacred Heart College, also in Kochi. He joined the State Bank of India as an officer; but, later, gave up the bank job for a career in teaching English Literature. T.R. started writing short-fiction from 1969. Korunnyotathu Komutti, Naam Naalayute Nanakkedu and Jassakkine Kollaruthu are his well-known works of fiction. T.R. also interviewed Günter Grass when he visited Kochi in 1975. His book Chitrakalayum Cherrukathayum is study on the art of writing and painting. His death came suddenly in Kochi, when he was having his morning walk, aged 56. D.C. Books, Kottayam posthumously brought out his complete works of fiction in one volume.
