= P. J. Thomas, Parakunnel =

Indian economist

P. J. Thomas

Member of Rajya Sabha
- In office 22 April 1957 – 2 April 1962

Member of the Madras Legislative Council
- In office 1937–1942

Personal details
- Born: February 25, 1895 Kuravilangad, Kottayam district, Travancore
- Died: August 16, 1965 (aged 70)
- Parent(s): Parekunnel Joseph; Annama Thomas
- Relatives: Pakalomattam family
- Occupation: Writer, Historian, Economist

Parekunnel Joseph Thomas (25 February 1895 - 16 August 1965) was the first economic advisor of independent India. He was a Member of the Madras Legislative Council and later Member of the upper house (Rajya Sabha) of the Indian Parliament.

== Biography ==
He was born on 25 February 1895 at Kuravilangad, near Palai, in Meenachil Taluk, Kottayam District, Kerala as the son of Thommen Ouseph and Annama Thomas. He had his schooling at St. Ephraim's High School, Mannanam and did Intermediate at C M.S. College, Kottayam and M.A. at Department of Economics, St. Joseph's College, Trichy.

Initially he worked as a lecturer at University College, Trivandrum. In 1920 he went to UK and took B.Litt. from Balliol College, University of Oxford (1920–1922) and later D.Phil., also from University of Oxford (1922–1924). On his return he worked as professor at the University of Ceylon (1924–1927) and the University of Madras (1927–1942).

His public life started when he became a Member of the Madras Legislative Council in 1937 and continued as a Member up to 1942. In 1942 he became adviser, Department of Finance, Government of India, held that position during India's independence and continued for 6 years up to 1948. Dr Thomas signed the Bretton Woods Agreement that founded the IMF and the World Bank. He was a member of the Indian delegation that signed the United Nations Charter in 1945.

After leaving government service, he functioned as the founder-principal of St. Thomas College, Palai (1950–1952). He later became a Member of Rajya Sabha (1957–1962).

He died on 26 July 1965 and is buried at the Infant Jesus Church, South Vazhakulam which falls under the Kizhakambalam forane of Ernakulam-Angamaly archdiocese, at Aluva, in the district of Ernakulam, Kerala, India.

== Famous works ==
- 'The Indian calico trade and its influence on English history', B.Litt. thesis, Oxford, 1922.'
- Mercantilism and the East India trade', P. S. King and Son Ltd., London, 1926
- 'The South Indian tradition of the Apostle Thomas', Journal of the Royal Asiatic Society, London, England, 1924, Centenary supplement, pp. 213–223
- 'The beginnings of calico-printing in England', English historical review, XXXIX(154), April 1924, pp. 206–216.'
- 'Was the Apostle St. Thomas in South India?', Madras, 1929
- 'An ancient monastery of St. Thomas in Mylapore', Madras, 1934.
- 'The problem of rural indebtedness', Madras, 1934.
- 'India in the world depression', The Economic Journal, Vol. 45, No. 179, Sep. 1935, pp. 469–483.
- 'Malayalam literature and Christians' SPCS, Kottayam, 1961. First Edition: St. Mary's Press, Athirampuzha, 1935
- 'Economic depression in the Madras presidency (1825–54)', with B. Natarajan, The Economic History Review, VII(1), Nov. 1936, pp. 67–75
- 'The marriage customs of the St. Thomas Christians of Malabar', Madras, 1936.
- 'Indian currency in the depression', The Economic Journal, Vol. 48, No. 190, Jun. 1938, pp. 237–248.'The growth of federal finance in India: being a survey of India's public finances from 1833 to 1939', Humphrey Milford, Oxford University Press, Madras, 1939. Partly composed as D.Phil. thesis, Oxford, 1924.
- 'Indian agricultural statistics: an introductory study', with N. Sundararama Sastry, University of Madras, Madras, 1939. Review.
- 'Economic results of prohibition in the Salem District (Oct. 1937-Sept. 1938)', University of Madras economics series, no. 2, Madras, 1940.
- 'Commodity prices in South India, 1918-1938', with N. Sundararama Sastry, University of Madras economics series, no. 3, Madras, 1940.
- 'Some South Indian villages: a resurvey', with R. C. Ramakrishnan, University of Madras economics series, no. 4, Madras, 1940. Review.
- 'Studies in the price of rice in South India', Sankhya: the Indian journal of statistics, V(3), 1940, pp. 195–200.
- 'The census as an agency for economic planning', Sankhya: the Indian journal of statistics, V(3), 1940, pp. 247–248.
- 'Report on the regulation of the stock market in India', Department of Finance, Government of India, 1948
- 'India's basic industries', Orient Longman, Calcutta, 1948.'Kerala's trading class', Journal of the Rama Varma Archaeological Society, XIV (1948), Trichur.
- 'St. Thomas the Apostle: A souvenir of the 19th century of his arrival in India', Ernakulam, 1952.
