= George Menachery =

Indian professor, anthropologist, indologist and historian

- Born: 2 April 1938 (age 88); Kattoor, Thrissur, Kerala
- Occupation: Historian
- Known for: Thomapedia, Saint Thomas Christian Encyclopaedia of India

George Menachery is a professor, anthropologist, indologist, and historian of Syro-Malabar Church and of Kerala. He is the editor of the St. Thomas Christian Encyclopedia of India and the Indian Church History Classics. On 27 October 2022 he was bestowed with an honoris cusa degree of Ph.D. in Theology by SHUATS, Prayagraj-Alahabad. His book "Ecumenism and Church Unity in India" was released on 7 September 2022 at Karlsruhe, Germany during the 11th Assembly of the WCC by the Archbishop of Canterbury Most Rev.Justin Wembly. His latest book "Centuries-Old Paintings in Kerala Churches" was released by His Eminence Anthony Cardinal Poola at Palaur on 22 March, 2026.Menachery is also the recipient of the Chevalier honour of the Order of Saint Gregory the Great.

== Major works ==
Menachery has published books and articles in addition to scripting, researching, or directing television documentaries/serials and delivering many radio talks. His works include:

- 1973: The St. Thomas Christian Encyclopaedia of India; vol. I (editor) (ISBN 818713206X, LCCN 73--90556)
- 1982: The St. Thomas Christian Encyclopaedia of India; vol. II (editor)
- 1984: Pallikkalakalum Mattum (Malayalam)
- 1986: Pope John Paul II Indian Visit Souvenir, Trichur
- 1987: Trichur Archdiocesan Centenary Volume (member of the editorial board)
- 1996: The St. Antony Octingenary Volume, (chief ed.) Ollur
- 1998: The Indian Church History Classics; Vol. I: The Nazranies (ISBN 81-87133-04-X, LCCN 98--90836)
- 2000: Thomapedia
- 2005: Glimpses of Nazraney Heritage
- 2004: Christian Contribution to Nation Building: a Third Millennium Enquiry (ed. with Ponnumuthan and Aerath) Documentary Committee of CBCI-KCBC National Celebration of the Jubilee of St. Thomas and St. Francis Xavier, 2004
- 2006: The Indian Christian Directory ICD - Deepika Kottayam (ed. in charge)
- 2009: The St. Thomas Christian Encyclopaedia of India; vol. III (editor)
- 2011: India's Christian Heritage (ed. with Snaitang) Church History Association of India (2011, 2012);
- 2013: Catholic Directory of India, CBCI, New Delhi (member of the editorial board)
- 2014: Aanayum Nazraaniyum [The Elephant and the Thomas Christian] (Malayalam) ISBN 81-87133-12-0
- 2015: Pallikalile Chitrabhaasangal [The Murals of Kerala Churches] (Malayalam) ISBN 81-87133-13-9
- 2016: Dasaavatharika [Menachery's Introductions to ten books by reputed authors dealing with history, culture] (Malayalam) ISBN 81-87133-14-7
- 2018: Facets of India's Christian Legacy [Menachery's ten famous articles/papers dealing with history, culture, archaeology, art, architecture] ISBN 978-1642498318

2026: "Centuries-Old Paintings in Kerala Churches",
