= K. P. Dandapani =

Indian lawyer (died 2023)

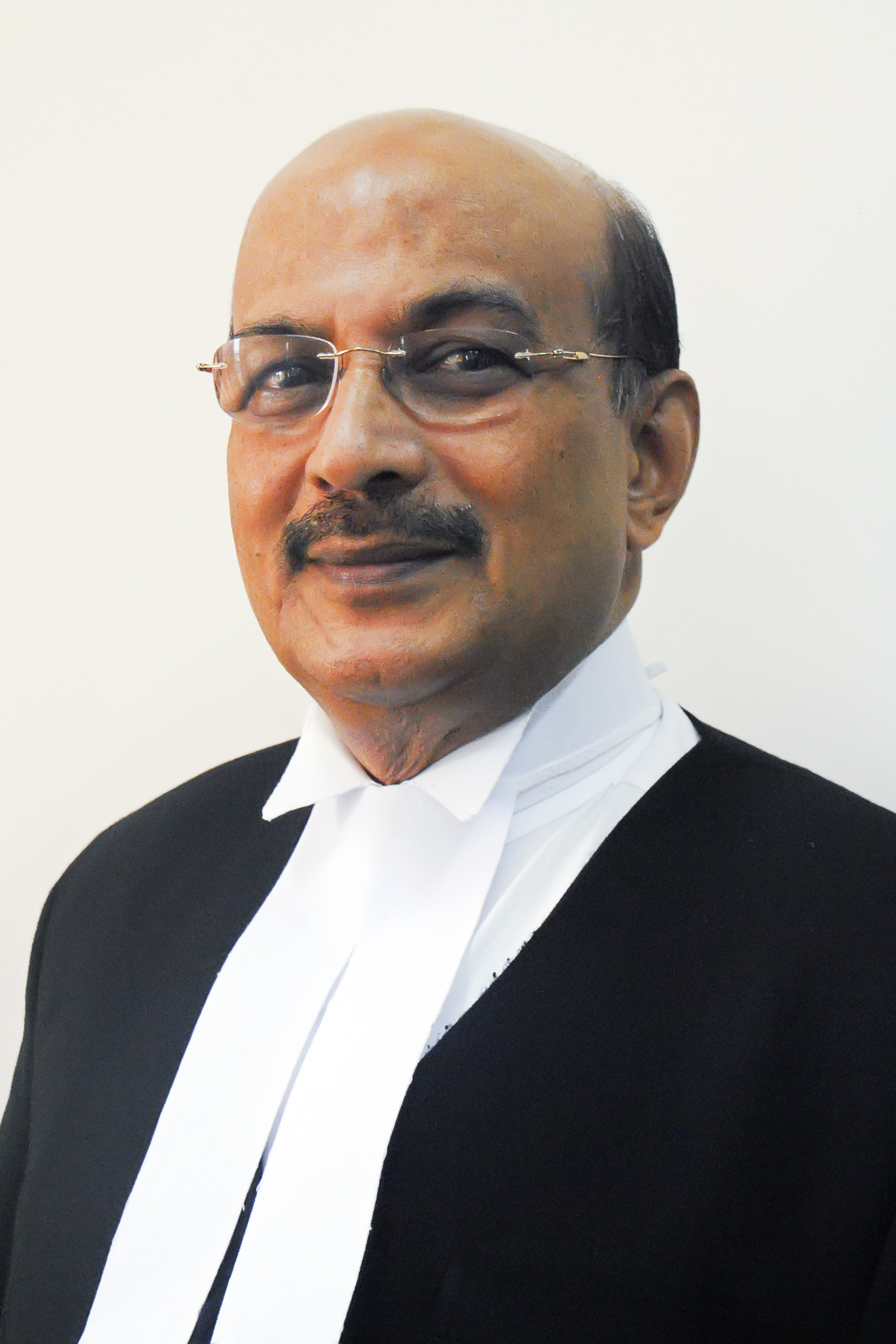
- Born: May 11, 1946
- Died: 21 March 2023 (aged 79); Ernakulam, Kerala, India
- Occupation: Senior advocate
- Known for: Advocate General to the Government of Kerala (2011–2016)
- Spouse: Sumathi
- Children: 2
- Parents: V. K. Padmanabhan; M. K. Narayani

K. P. Dandapani (c. 1946 – 21 March 2023) was an Indian lawyer. He was advocate general to the Government of Kerala from 2011 to 2016.

== Early life ==
K. P. Dandapani was born in Kerala as was the son of V. K. Padmanabhan and M. K. Narayani. Dandapani completed his primary education at St. Albert's High School, Ernakulam. After his primary education, he attended St. Albert's College followed by Government Law College, Ernakulam. He completed his law degree and graduated in 1968 and enrolled as an advocate in the same year.

== Career ==
Dandapani enrolled as an advocate on 17 May 1968. He started his legal practice under S. Easwara Iyer. He started independent practice in 1972 with his wife Sumathi Dandapani, in the fields of civil, company, constitution, and criminal laws.

In 1996, he was appointed judge of Kerala High Court. However, five months after the appointment he was transferred to Gujarat High Court after being terminated by the President of India for non compliance of order, and he and his wife became designated as senior advocates by the Kerala High Court.

He was the legal adviser and standing counsel of many companies and establishments, including the PowerGrid Corporation of India, The Leela Group, National Institute of Technology Calicut, Greater Cochin Development Authority, Thangal Kunju Musaliar College of Engineering, Kollam, Malabar Christian College, Kozhikode, Malayala Manorama and Anna Kitex Group. He was president of the Kerala High Court Advocates' Association. He was one of the committee members of Kerala High Court Legal Service Authority.

== Personal life and death ==
Dandapani was married to Sumathi and had two children. His daughter Mittu is a practicing lawyer in Australia, and his son Millu is a practicing lawyer of the Kerala High Court. His wife Sumathi Dandapani is also a practicing senior advocate in the Kerala High Court.

Dandapani died on 21 March 2023, at the age of 76.
