= Manuel Frederick =

Indian field hockey player (1947–2025)

Personal information
- Born: 20 October 1947 Burnassery, Kannur district, Madras Province, India
- Died: 31 October 2025 (aged 78) Bengaluru, Karnataka, India

Sport
- Sport: Field hockey
- Position: Goalkeeper
Medal record
Representing India
Men's Field hockey
Olympic Games
Bronze medal – third place	1972 Munich	Team

Manuel Frederick (20 October 1947 – 31 October 2025) was an Indian field hockey player who played as goalkeeper from Kannur district in Kerala. He won a bronze medal at the 1972 Summer Olympics in Munich. He was the first Keralite to win an Olympic medal. The second Keralite to win an Olympic medal is P. R. Sreejesh who won a bronze on 5 August 2021 in Tokyo Olympics. Both medals for Kerala have come via the goalkeepers of the National Hockey Team.

Manuel Frederick was born on 20 October 1947; at Burnasserry in Kannur district of Kerala state to Joseph and Sara. Before starting to play hockey, he played football for B.M.P U.P. School in Kannur.

In 2019, he was awarded Dhyan Chand Award for Lifetime Achievement in Sports and Games by Ministry of Youth Affairs and Sports.

Frederick died on 31 October 2025, at the age of 78.
