= Kerala Catholic Bishops' Council =

Catholic organization in Kerala, India

The Kerala Catholic Bishops' Council is a permanent association of the Catholic bishops in Kerala. Headquartered in Kochi, it is an association of three rites of the Catholic Church - the Roman / Latin, the Syro Malabar and the Syro Malankara. The stated objectives of KCBC are to facilitate, co-ordinate, study and discuss questions affecting the Church, and to adopt a common policy and effective action in all matters concerning the Church in Kerala.

The Catholic hierarchy in Kerala jointly exercise certain pastoral functions on behalf of the Christian faithful in Kerala. The purpose of the Council is drawn from the universal law of the Church and applies to all episcopal conferences and Councils.

This Council is the Regional Council for the State of Kerala, constituted under the “Catholic Bishops Conference of India” (C.B.C.I) in accordance with the articles of its statutes to cater for the special needs of the apostolate in the State. This Council shall in no way limit, prejudice or interfere with the distinctive character of the Individual Churches in respect of their liturgy, ecclesiastical discipline and spiritual patrimony, such matters being subject to the competent authority of the particular Church concerned.

The general purpose of the Council is to facilitate for its members the coordinated research, study and discussion of questions of common concern and of a regional and supra-ritual character affecting the Church in Kerala and the prosecution of a common policy and concerted pastoral action.
