= Sunil Thomas =

Indian judge

The Honourable Justice Sunil Thomas

Judge Kerala High Court
- In office 10 April 2015 – 9 May 2022
- Nominated by: Rajendra Mal Lodha
- Appointed by: Pranab Mukherjee

Personal details
- Born: 10 May 1960 (age 66) Tripunithura, Ernakulam
- Citizenship: Indian
- Education: Maharaja's College, Ernakulam
- Website: High Court of Kerala

Sunil Thomas (born 10 May 1960) is a retired judge of Kerala High Court, the highest court in the Indian state of Kerala and in the Union Territory of Lakshadweep. The High Court is headquartered at Ernakulam, Kochi.

== Education and career ==
Thomas completed his schooling from Rajagiri High School, Kalamassery, Ernakulam, graduated from St. Albert's College, obtained a law degree from Government Law College, Ernakulam and completed his post graduation in law from Cochin University, Ernakulam. Thomas enrolled as an Advocate in 1983 and started practice at Ernakulam. While practicing he served as part time lecturer at Government Law College, Ernakulam. Thomas entered judicial service as District judge in 2001, served as Additional District and Sessions Judge, Thrissur, till 2005, Palakkad from 2005 to 2007 and Registrar of Supreme Court from 2007 to 2014. He was appointed Additional Judge of the High Court of Kerala on 10 April 2015 and became permanent from 5 April 2017. Justice Thomas demitted his office upon attaining the age of superannuation on 10 May 2022.
