= Indian Academy of Pediatrics =

Professional association of Indian pediatricians

- Abbreviation: IAP
- Formation: 1963
- Type: Pediatric association
- Headquarters: Mumbai, India
- Region served: India
- Main organ: Indian Pediatrics

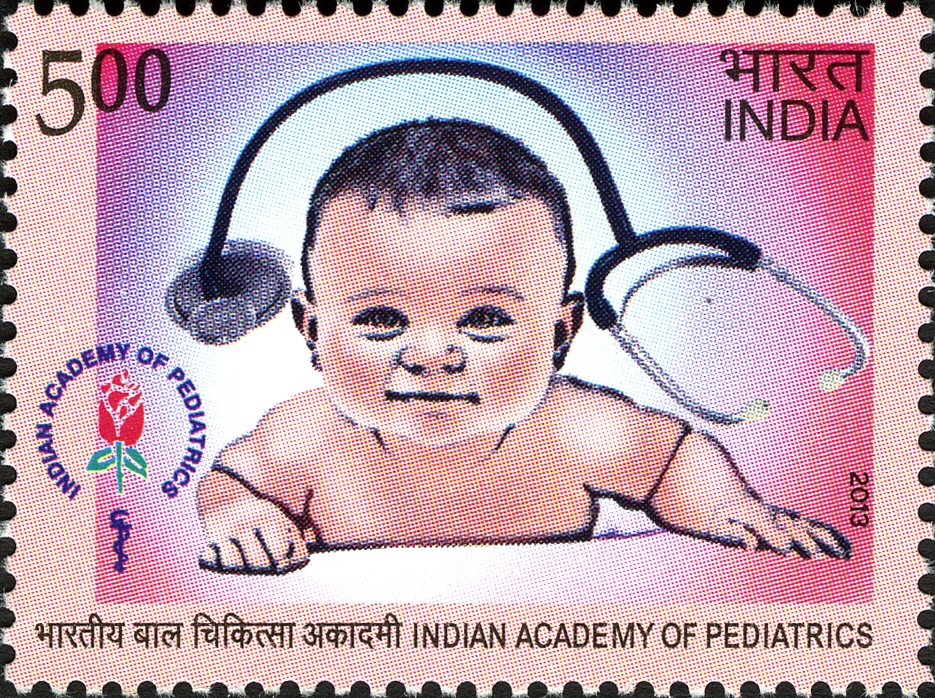
2013 stamp dedicated to the Indian Academy of Pediatrics

The Indian Academy of Pediatrics is the association of Indian pediatricians. It was established in 1963, in Mumbai, India and claims to have 50,000 members, as of the year 2025 The head office of IAP is in Mumbai while Delhi is the seat of its official publication – Indian Pediatrics, a MEDLINE indexed medical journal. It also publishes another medical journal called Indian Journal of Practical Pediatrics from Chennai.

In 2017, the IAP was involved in controversy when a pediatrician who had exposed collaborations between vaccine manufacturers was allegedly manhandled at the organisation's annual conference and suspended from the organisation's Advisory Committee on Vaccines and Immunization Practices. The move by IAP has been criticized by other medical organisations like the Alliance of Doctors for Ethical Healthcare (ADEH) and Medico Friends Circle (MFC).

== History ==
In 1948, K. C. Chaudhury founded the Indian Pediatric Society, which later merged with the Association of Pediatricians to form the Indian Academy of Pediatrics (IAP), a single body that would represent Indian pediatricians. The IAP held its first national conference in 1964, in Pune. Its official journal, Indian Pediatrics, first published in Kolkata in 1964, was formed by the integration of the Indian Journal of Child Health and the Journal of the Indian Pediatric Society.
