= Mary Joseph =

Indian Judge (born 1962)

Hon'ble Justice Mary Joseph
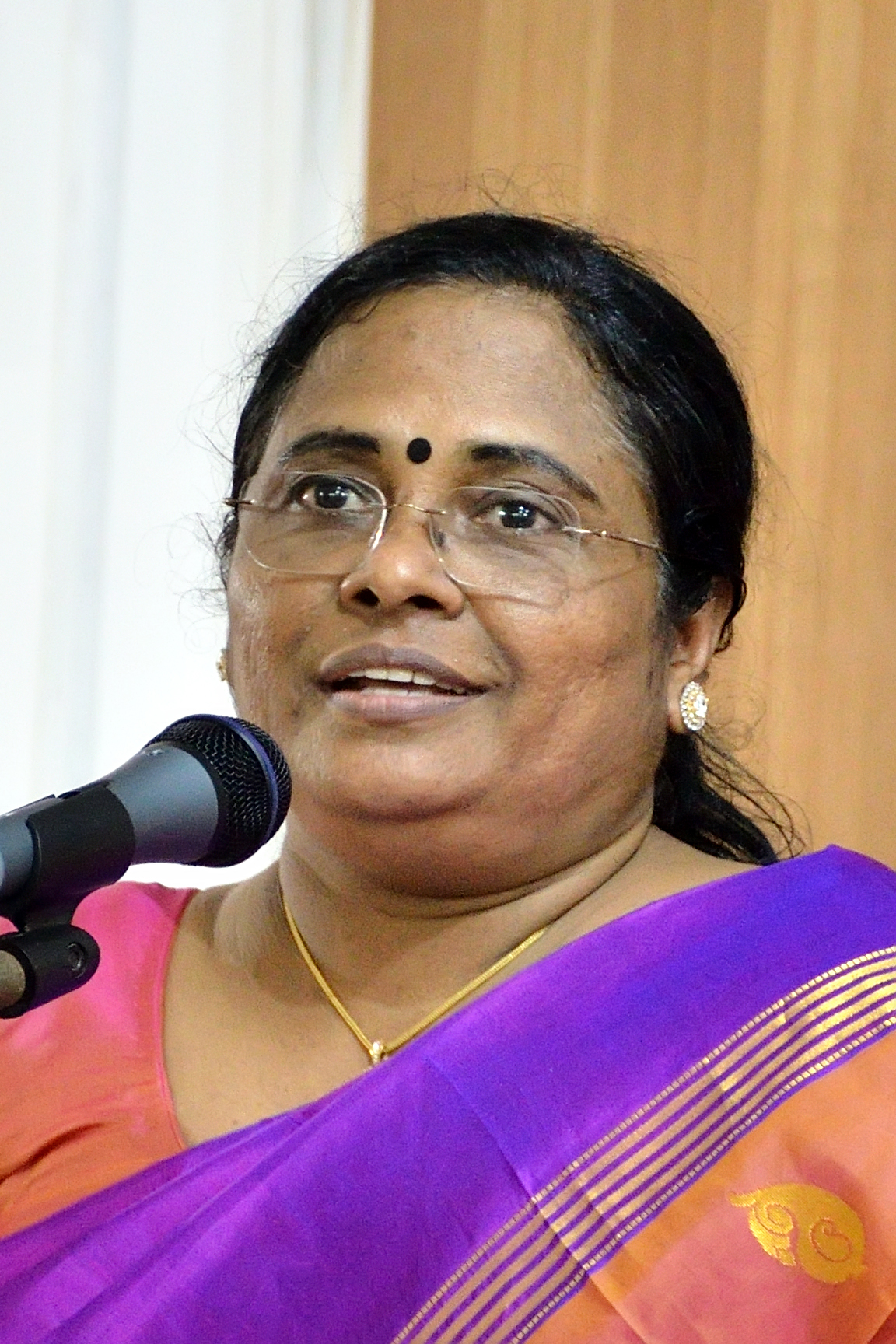

Judge of Kerala High Court
- Incumbent
- Assumed office 10 April 2015
- Nominated by: H. L. Dattu
- Appointed by: Pranab Mukherjee

Personal details
- Born: 2 June 1962 (age 64) Elamkulam, Ernakulam District
- Citizenship: Indian
- Education: Government Law College, Ernakulam
- Alma mater: Cochin University of Science and Technology
- Website: High Court of Kerala

Mary Joseph (born 2 June 1962) is an Indian judge of the Kerala High Court, the highest court in the Indian state of Kerala and in the Union Territory of Lakshadweep.

== Early life ==
She was born in Elamkulam, Ernakulam District. Completed her schooling from St. Joseph's U. P. School, Karithala, Karikkamuri, Ernakulam and St. Teresa's Convent Girls High School, Ernakulam, graduation from Sacred Heart College, Thevara, completed law degree from Government Law College, Ernakulam and master's degree in law from Cochin University of Science and Technology at Ernakulam.

== Career ==
She enrolled in Bar Council of Kerala on 26 January 1986 and started practicing as an advocate in civil and criminal laws at High Court Of Kerala and various subordinate courts at Ernakulam. She served as additional district government pleader and public prosecutor in District Court, Ernakulam from 1993 till 1996. She was appointed district judge in Kerala Judiciary in 2001. She was promoted as additional judge of the Kerala High Court on 10 April 2015 and appointed as permanent judge from 5 April 2017.
