= List of institutions of higher education in Kerala =

Kerala is home to some of the most reputed institutes for higher education in India.

== Top Institutions in Kerala (NIRF 2024) ==
Category	Name	Place	NIRF 2024 Rank
Overall (out of 100)	Kerala	Thiruvananthapuram	38
Overall (out of 100)	CUSAT	Ernakulam	51
Overall (out of 100)	NIT	Kozhikode	54
Overall (out of 100)	MG	Kottayam	67
Universities (out of 100)	Kerala	Thiruvananthapuram	21
Universities (out of 100)	CUSAT	Ernakulam	34
Universities (out of 100)	MG	Kottayam	37
Universities (out of 100)	Calicut	Malappuram	89
Colleges (out of 100)	Rajagiri College of Social Sciences	Ernakulam	20
Colleges (out of 100)	University College	Thiruvananthapuram	22
Colleges (out of 100)	St. Teresa’s College	Ernakulam	46
Colleges (out of 100)	Sacred Heart College, Thevara	Ernakulam	48
Colleges (out of 100)	Govt College for Women	Thiruvananthapuram	49
Colleges (out of 100)	Maharaja’s College	Ernakulam	53
Colleges (out of 100)	St. Thomas College	Thrissur	57
Colleges (out of 100)	St. Joseph’s College	Kozhikode	61
Colleges (out of 100)	Bishop Moore College	Alappuzha	62
Colleges (out of 100)	Mar Ivanios College	Thiruvananthapuram	66
Colleges (out of 100)	SB College	Kottayam	69
Colleges (out of 100)	Mar Athanasius College	Ernakulam	74
Colleges (out of 100)	Vimala College	Thrissur	80
Colleges (out of 100)	Mar Ivanios College	Thiruvananthapuram	79
Colleges (out of 100)	Govt Victoria College	Palakkad	84
Colleges (out of 100)	St. Joseph's College, Irinjalakuda	Thrissur	85
Colleges (out of 100)	CMS College Kottayam	Kottayam	92
Engineering (out of 100)	NIT	Kozhikode	25
Engineering (out of 100)	IIST	Thiruvananthapuram	51
Engineering (out of 100)	IIT	Palakkad	64
Management (out of 100)	IIM	Kozhikode	03
Management (out of 100)	NIT	Kozhikode	76
Management (out of 100)	CUSAT	Ernakulam	81
Management (out of 100)	Rajagiri Business School	Ernakulam	93
Medical (out of 100)	SCTIMST	Thiruvananthapuram	13
Medical (out of 100)	Govt Medical College	Thiruvananthapuram	42
Dental (out of 100)	Govt Dental College	Thiruvananthapuram	21
Architecture (out of 100)	NIT	Kozhikode	03
Architecture (out of 100)	College of Engineering, Trivandrum	Thiruvananthapuram	18
Agriculture (out of 100)	KAU	Thrissur	16
Agriculture (out of 100)	KUFOS	Ernakulam	30
Law (out of 100)	NUALS	Ernakulam	38

== Universities ==
The higher education system in India includes both private and public universities. Universities in India are recognised by the University Grants Commission (UGC), which draws its power from the University Grants Commission Act, 1956.
The types of universities include:

	UNIVERSITIES IN INDIA
CENTRAL UNIVERSITIES	STATE UNIVERSITIES	DEEMED UNIVERSITIES	PRIVATE UNIVERSITIES

=== Central Universities ===
No.	University	Location	Discipline	Founded
1	Central University of Kerala (CUK)	Kasaragod	Science, Fine arts, Literature	2009
2	Aligarh Muslim University (AMU), Malappuram Centre	Perinthalmanna	Multidisciplinary	2010
3	Indian Maritime University (IMU), Kochi Campus	Kochi	Maritime Studies	2009
4	Central Sanskrit University (CSU), Guruvayoor Campus	Guruvayoor	Sanskrit Studies	2020

=== State Universities ===
No.	University		Location	Discipline	Founded	Governing Authority
1	UoK	University of Kerala	Thiruvananthapuram	Multidisciplinary	1937	Higher Education
2	UoC	University of Calicut	Malappuram	Multidisciplinary	1968	Higher Education
3	CUSAT	Cochin University of Science and Technology	Kochi	Multidisciplinary	1971	Higher Education
4	KAU	Kerala Agricultural University	Thrissur	Agriculture, Engineering	1972	Agriculture Development & Farmers' Welfare
5	MGU	Mahatma Gandhi University, Kerala	Kottayam	Multidisciplinary	1983	Higher Education
6	SSUS	Sree Sankaracharya University of Sanskrit	Kochi	Sanskrit and Vedic studies	1994	Higher Education
7	KU	Kannur University	Kannur	Multidisciplinary	1997	Higher Education
8	NUALS	National University of Advanced Legal Studies (NUALS)	Kochi	Law	2005	Law Dept
9	KVASU	Kerala Veterinary and Animal Sciences University	Wayanad	Animal sciences	2010	Animal Husbandry
10	KUHS	Kerala University of Health Sciences	Thrissur	Medical, Paramedical, Health sciences	2010	Health and Family Welfare
11	KUFOS	Kerala University of Fisheries and Ocean Studies	Kochi	Fisheries, Climate science	2010	Fisheries
12	TEMU	Thunchath Ezhuthachan Malayalam University	Tirur	Malayalam language and literature	2012	Higher Education
13	KTU	A P J Abdul Kalam Technological University	Thiruvananthapuram	Engineering, Technology, Management	2014	Higher Education
14	SNOU	Sree Narayanaguru Open University	Kollam	Multidisciplinary Open University	2020	Higher Education
15	DUK	Kerala University of Digital Sciences, Innovation and Technology	Thiruvananthapuram	Engineering (Masters only), Technology, Humanities	2020	Science and Technology

=== Deemed Universities ===
No.		University	Location	Discipline	Founded	Deemed
1	KK	Kerala Kalamandalam	Thrissur	Performing arts	1930	2006
2	IIST	Indian Institute of Space Science and Technology	Thiruvananthapuram	Science and Technology	2007	2008
3	CVV	Chinmaya Vishwavidyapeeth	Ernakulam	Arts and Humanities	2017	2017
4	JUK	Jain(Deemed-to-be) University	Ernakulam	Management, Engineering, Design, Media, Forensic, Psychology	2021	2021
5	NIELIT	National Institute of Electronics & Information Technology, Calicut	Kozhikode	Electronics & Information Technology	1989	2023
6	Amrita	Amrita Vishwa Vidyapeetham, Amritapuri Campus	Kollam	Multidisciplinary	2002	2003
7	Amrita	Amrita Vishwa Vidyapeetham, Kochi Campus	Kochi	Multidisciplinary	1998	2003
8	IIMC	Indian Institute of Mass Communication, Southern Regional Centre	Kottayam	Journalism & Mass Communication	1994	2012

== Colleges ==
- List of colleges affiliated with Kannur University
- List of colleges affiliated to University of Calicut
- List of colleges affiliated with Mahatma Gandhi University
- List of colleges affiliated to Kerala University
- List of colleges affiliated to Kerala University of Health Sciences
- List of colleges affiliated to Kerala Agricultural University
- List of colleges affiliated with Kerala University of Fisheries and Ocean Studies
- List of colleges affiliated with Cochin University of Science and Technology

=== Law colleges ===
- Divine Law College, Pathanapuram
- Government Law College, Ernakulam
- Government Law College, Trivandrum
- Government Law College, Kozhikode
- Government Law College, Thrissur
- School Of Indian Legal Thought, Kottayam
- Kerala Law Academy Law College, Trivandrum
- Markaz Law College
- Sree Narayana Guru College of Legal Studies
- Aligarh Muslim University, Malappuram Campus
- Bharata Mata School of Legal Studies (BSOLS), [Aluva]
- C.S.I College For Legal Studies Kanakkary, Kottayam
- School of Legal Studies (Kannur university, Thalashery Campus ), [Palayad, Thalashery]

=== Business schools / MBA colleges / management departments ===
- Albertian Institute of Management
- Amity Business School, Kochi
- Amrita School Of Business, Kochi
- Asian School of Business, Thiruvananthapuram
- Berchmans Institute of Management Studies, Changanassery
- Bhavans Royal Institute Of Management, Kochi
- Bishop Jerome Institute, Kollam
- Cochin University of Science and Technology
- DCSMAT Business School
- Farook Institute of Management Studies (FIMS), Calicut
- IIM, Kochi (campus of IIMK)
- IIM, Kozhikode
- IIITM-K, Trivandrum
- Indian Institute of Logistics, Kochi
- Marian International Institute of Management (MIIM), Kuttikkanam, Idukki
- LEAD College of Management, Dhoni, Palakkad
- Marthoma College of Management and Technology (MCMAT), Perumbavoor, Ernakulam
- Rajagiri Centre for Business Studies, Kochi
- School of Communication and Management Studies, Kochi
- TKM Institute of Management
- Travancore Business Academy, Kollam
- UEI Global
- Vidya Bharathi Institute Of Management And Technology, Kochi
- Xavier Institute of Management and Entrepreneurship
- Allama Iqbal Institute of Management
- Aligarh Muslim University, Malappuram Campus
- SCM Hub International Logistics Business School, Kochi Info Park Campus
- Ibis Academy of Higher Education

=== Hotel management colleges ===
- Naipunnya School Of Hotel Management, Cherthala
- Institute of Hotel Management and Catering Technology, Kovalam
- Munnar Catering College

=== Private colleges ===
- Amrita Vishwa Vidyapeetham, Kollam (headquartered in Coimbatore, Tamil Nadu)
- Ahalia Health Heritage and Knowledge Village, Kozhipara, Palakkad
- Lancon Institute of Cyber Security (LICS) (EC-Council - USA) NH, Vatakara
- V Institute, Kollam
- Adi Institute Of Quality Engineers, Kochi

=== Polytechnic colleges ===
- List of polytechnic colleges in Kerala

=== Architecture colleges ===
- College of Architecture, Thiruvananthapuram, C.A.T
- Bishop Jerome School of Architecture, Kollam
- Asian School of Architecture & Design Innovation, Ernakulam, Kerala

=== Design institutes ===
- Atrium School Of Design, Perinthalmanna, Malappuram
- Kerala State Institute of Design, Kollam
- Creative Hut Institute of Photography, Mattakkara, Kottayam
- Terrafirm Global Academy, City Centre Campus, Kadavanthara, Kochi
- Terrafirm Global Academy, Riverside Green Campus, Aluva, Kochi
- Irohub Infotech, Palarivattom, Kochi
- Cindrebay, Kaloor, Kochi

=== Engineering ===
List of engineering colleges in Kerala

=== Skill Training Center (Kaushal Kendra) ===
- OGTM Skills Academy Govt. Skill Development Center, Training Partner IIIIER (MSDE, Govt. of India )

=== Medical ===
- List of medical colleges in Kerala

=== Maritime ===
- Euro Tech Maritime Academy, Kochi
- Indian Maritime University, Kochi

=== Pharmacy colleges ===
==== Medical laboratory technology colleges ====
- A.G.M. School of Paramedicals
- Alphonsa Para Medical School
- Babes Paramedical Laboratory, Changanassery
- Mary Queens Medical Technological Laboratory, Thiruvalla
- Queen Mary's Medical Technological Laboratory, Karukachal
- S.G Laboratory, Mallappally
- St Julian Medical Technological Laboratory, Karukachal

==== Govt pharmacy colleges ====
- College of Pharmaceutical Science, Kozhikode, Kozhikode Medical College
- College of Pharmaceutical Science, Thiruvananthapuram, Medical College, Thiruvananthapuram
- Department of Pharmaceutical Sciences, Mahatma Gandhi University, Kottayam
- Academy of Pharmaceutical Sciences Pariyaram Medical College, Kannur

==== Private self financing pharmacy colleges ====
- A.M. College of Pharmacy, Vavvakkavu Post, Karunagappally, Kollam-690 528
- Alshifa College of Pharmacy, Perinthalmanna
- Amrita School of Pharmacy, AIMS Health Sciences Campus, Kochi
- Crescent B.Pharm College, Madayipara, Kannur
- The Dale View College of Pharmacy & Research Centre, Punalal PO, Thiruvananthapuram
- Devaki Amma Memorial College of Pharmacy, PO Pulliparamba, Chelembra, Malappuram
- Ezhuthachan National Academy Pharmacy, College & Research Institute, Maryamuttom, Neyyattinkara, Thiruvananthapuram
- Fathima College of Pharmacy, Kollam
- Grace College of Pharmacy, Palakkad
- JDT Islam College of Pharmacy, Marikunnu PO, Kozhikode
- Karuna College of Pharmacy, Iringuttoor, Palakkad Dist
- Malik Dinar College of Pharmacy, Seethagole, Kasaragode
- Mar Dioscorus College of Pharmacy, Sreekariyam, Thiruvananthapuram
- Naserath College of Pharmacy, Othera, Thiruvalla
- Nehru College of Pharmacy, near Lakkdi Railway Station, Thiruvillwamala, Thrissur
- Nirmala College of Pharmacy, Moovattupuzha
- Pharmacy College of St James Medical Academy, Govt. Hospital Road, Chalakkudy
- Pushpagiri College of Pharmacy, Perumthurthi PO, Pathanamthitta
- Royal College
- Sri Vidyadhiraja Pharmacy College, Thiruvananthapuram
- St. Joseph's College of Pharmacy, Muttom, Cherthala
- ELIMS College of Pharmacy, Villadam, Ramavarmapuram P O, Thrissur
- Hindustan College of Pharmacy, Kanjirapally, Kottayam
- KTN college of pharmacy, chalavara, Palakkad

=== B.Ed colleges ===
- NSS Training College, Pandalam
- Al-azhar Training College, Thodupuzha
- Ansar Training College for Women, Perumpilavu, Trichur
- Arafa Teacher Education, Attur, Thrissur
- Indira Gandhi Training College, Kothamangalam
- Farook Training College, Calicut
- Kaviyattu College of Education, Pirappancode, Thiruvananthapuram, Kerala
- Mar Baselious Paulose II Training College, Puthencruz
- Mt Tabore Training College, Pathanapuram
- NSS Training College Ottapalam
- Sree Narayana Guru Kripa Trust BEd College, Pothencode, Thiruvananthapuram
- Titus II Teachers College, Thiruvalla
- Mar Osthatheos Training College, Akkikavu, Thrissur
- St. Gregorios Teachers'Training College, Meenangadi
- Aligarh Muslim University, Malappuram Campus

=== Teacher training institutes (TTI) ===
- Darul Uloom Teacher Training Institute, Thootha, Perinthalmanna
- Fazfari Teacher Training Institute, Padinjattummuri, Malappuram
- Mankada Orphanage Teacher Training Institute, Mankada, Perinthalmanna
- T.D. Teacher Training Institute, Mattancherry, Kochi-2

== Autonomous institutions ==
No.	College		Location	Type	Founded	Autonomous declaration	Management type	Institution of National Importance
1	CDS	Centre for Development Studies	Thiruvananthapuram	Social Science	1970	1970	State	No
2	CIFT	Central Institute of Fisheries Technology	Kochi	Marine research	1954	1954	Central	No
3	CMFRI	Central Marine Fisheries Research Institute	Kochi	Marine research	1971	1971	Central	No
4	IISR	Indian Institute of Spices Research	Kozhikode	Agriculture	1975	1975	Central	No
5	IIM	Indian Institute of Management, Kozhikode	Kozhikode	Management science	1996	1996	Central	Yes
6	IIITM	Indian Institute of Information Technology and Management, Kerala	Thiruvananthapuram	Computer science	2002	2002	State	No
7	IIIT	Indian Institute of Information Technology, Kottayam	Kottayam	Computer Science	2015	2015	PPP	Yes
8	IISST	Indian Institute of Space Science and Technology	Thiruvananthapuram	Science, Technology	2007	2008	Central	No
9	IISER	Indian Institute of Science Education and Research	Thiruvananthapuram	Science, Technology	2008	2008	Central	Yes
10	IIT	Indian Institute of Technology	Palakkad	Science, Technology	2015	2015	Central	Yes
11	IIHT	Indian Institute of Handloom Technology	Kannur	Textile technology	1987	1987	State	No
12	KPA	Kerala Press Academy	Kochi	Media	1979	1979	State	No
13	NIFT	National Institute of Fashion Technology Campus in Kannur	Kannur	Fashion education	2008	2008	Central	No
14	NUALS	National University of Advanced Legal Studies	Kochi	Legal education	2005	2009	State	No
15	NIT	National Institute of Technology	Kozhikode	Engineering	1961	2002	Central	Yes
16	RGCB	Rajiv Gandhi Centre for Biotechnology	Thiruvananthapuram	Medical research	1990	2002	Central	Yes
17	SCTIMST	Sree Chitra Tirunal Institute for Medical Sciences and Technology	Thiruvananthapuram	Medicine, Health science	1974	2002	Central	Yes
18	RCC	Regional Cancer Centre	Thiruvananthapuram	Cancer Research	1981	2014	State	Yes

== See also ==
- ER&DCI Institute of Technology, Trivandrum
- National Institute of Electronics & Information Technology, Calicut
- Indian Institute of Technology in Kerala
- Indian Institute of Mass Communication, Kottayam
- KEAM
