= Vijayarajamallika =

Transgender poet in Malayalam literature

- Born: Manu J Krishnan; 1 March 1985 (age 41); Muthuvara, Thrissur, Kerala, India
- Education: Rajagiri College of Social Sciences; St. Thomas College, Thrissur
- Occupations: Writer, activist, teacher
- Spouse: Jashim
- Writing career
- Notable works: Daivathinte Makal; Aan Nadhi; Mallikavasantham; Aanalla Pennalla; A Word to Mother; Pennayavalude Kavithakal

Vijayarajamallika is an Indian transgender poet in Malayalam literature, She is a writer, teacher, social worker, inspirational speaker, and activist.

== Early life, family and education ==
Vijayarajamallika was born in 1985 at Muthuvara, Thrissur district, Kerala, India, to Kaniyamkonatth Veettil Y. Krishnan, a retired superintendent of Kerala State Electricity Board (KSEB); and Jaya Krishnan, a teacher.

Her primary education was at Kendriya Vidyalaya, Puranattukara. She completed a bachelor of arts degree in English Literature and History from St. Thomas College, Thrissur with the second rank from the University of Calicut in 2005. In 2009 she completed Master of Social Work (MSW) from Rajagiri College of Social Sciences.

Vijayarajamallika describes herself as being "a woman in my heart…even though I was in the male body". Vijayarajamallika is an intersex person with Klinefelter syndrome or 47 XXY, which she discovered at the age of 32 after doing Karyotyping from Government Medical College, Kozhikode. She says that "knowing that she is an intersex is the proudest moment in her life"

She was married to Jashim, a software engineer. It was a controversial love marriage. The parents and relatives of Jashim were opposed to the marriage which was held in the office of Kerala Sasthra Sahithya Parishad state committee at Thrissur.

== Career ==
Daivathinte Makal (Daughter of God), her first collection of poetry, has been included in the syllabus of a course at the Department of Malayalam at Madras University. The poem, "Maranantharam" from Daivathinte Makal was included in the curriculum of Mahatma Gandhi University, Kerala, and another poem, "Neelambari" from Daivathinte Makal, was included in the curriculum of Sree Sankaracharya University of Sanskrit. "Maranantharam" a notable poem from this book was translated into English by N. P. Ashley and was published in the book The World that Belongs to Us by Harper Collins.

Vijayarajamallika is the founder of Sahaj International, India's first transgender alternative learning center which worked in collaboration with the National Institute of Open Schooling (NIOS) at Kochi. She winded up Sahaj International as Kerala Government incorporated transgender education through the Kerala State Literacy Mission.

Aan Nadhi (Male River), her second poetry collection, was published by Mythri Books Thiruvanathapuram. It describes the life and struggles of LGBTIAQ+ people with special reference to transgender and Intersex communities. Aan Nadhi was significant in contributing ten new words to Malayalam Literature.

Vijayarajamallika's autobiography Mallikavasantham is the first transgender autobiography in Malayalam literature. She won the Swami Vivekanadhan Yuva Prathibha Award for literature in 2019 instituted by the Kerala State Youth Welfare Board for this autobiography. It also bagged the first ever Leela Menon literary award in the category of autobiography.

"Aanalla Pennalla Kanmani nee" is a lullaby penned by Vijayarajamallika which is reported to be the first intersex lullaby in the history of World Literature.

Daivathinte Makal won the Yuvakala Sahithi Vayalar Award in 2019. The State of Kerala has honored her for her contributions and achievements in the field of literature from the transgender community during the ‘Varnapakittu 2019’, the first-ever transgender arts festival organized by the social justice department.

Ormayil Ragini is a yearly event organized by Vijayarajamallika in memory of actress Ragini.

== Bibliography ==
- Daivathinte Makal (collection of poems)
- Aan Nadi (collection of poems)
- Mallikavasantham (autobiography)
- Aanalla Penalla Kanmani (Intersex Lullaby)
- A Word to Mother: Realisation of Reading in between Lines
- Pennayavalude Kavithakal (collection of poems)
- Lilithinu Maranamilla (collection of poems)
- Mattorupennala Njan (collection of poems)
- Mula Mulaykkatha Maarile Kuthirapanthayangal (collection of poems)
- Kelkkatha Sabdangal (Co-editor)(A collection of the first queer writings in Malayalam published by Kerala Sahitya Akademi)

== Awards ==
- Arali Award (2016)
- Yuvakalasahithi Vayalar Kavitha Award (Daivatthinte Makal, 2019)
- Swami Vivekanadhan Yuva Prathibha Award for Literature (2019)
- First Leela Menon literary award in the category of autobiography (2021)
