= RCSS =

RCSS may refer to:

- Real Canadian Superstore
- Restoration Council of Shan State
- Taipei Songshan Airport, by ICAO code
- Rajagiri College of Social Sciences
