= Government Arts and Science College, Mankada =

Government Arts and Science College, Mankada is a general degree college located in Punnakkad, Kolathur, Malappuram, Kerala. It was established in the year 2013 . The college is affiliated with Calicut University., This college offers different courses in arts, commerce and science.

== Departments ==
=== Science ===
- BSC Psychology
- BSC Maths

=== Arts ===
- BA History
- BA Economics
- BA English

=== Commerce ===
- Bcom
- BBA

== See also ==
- Education in India
- Education in Kerala
- List of institutions of higher education in Kerala
- List of colleges affiliated to the University of Calicut
