= Muthuvara Mahadeva Temple =

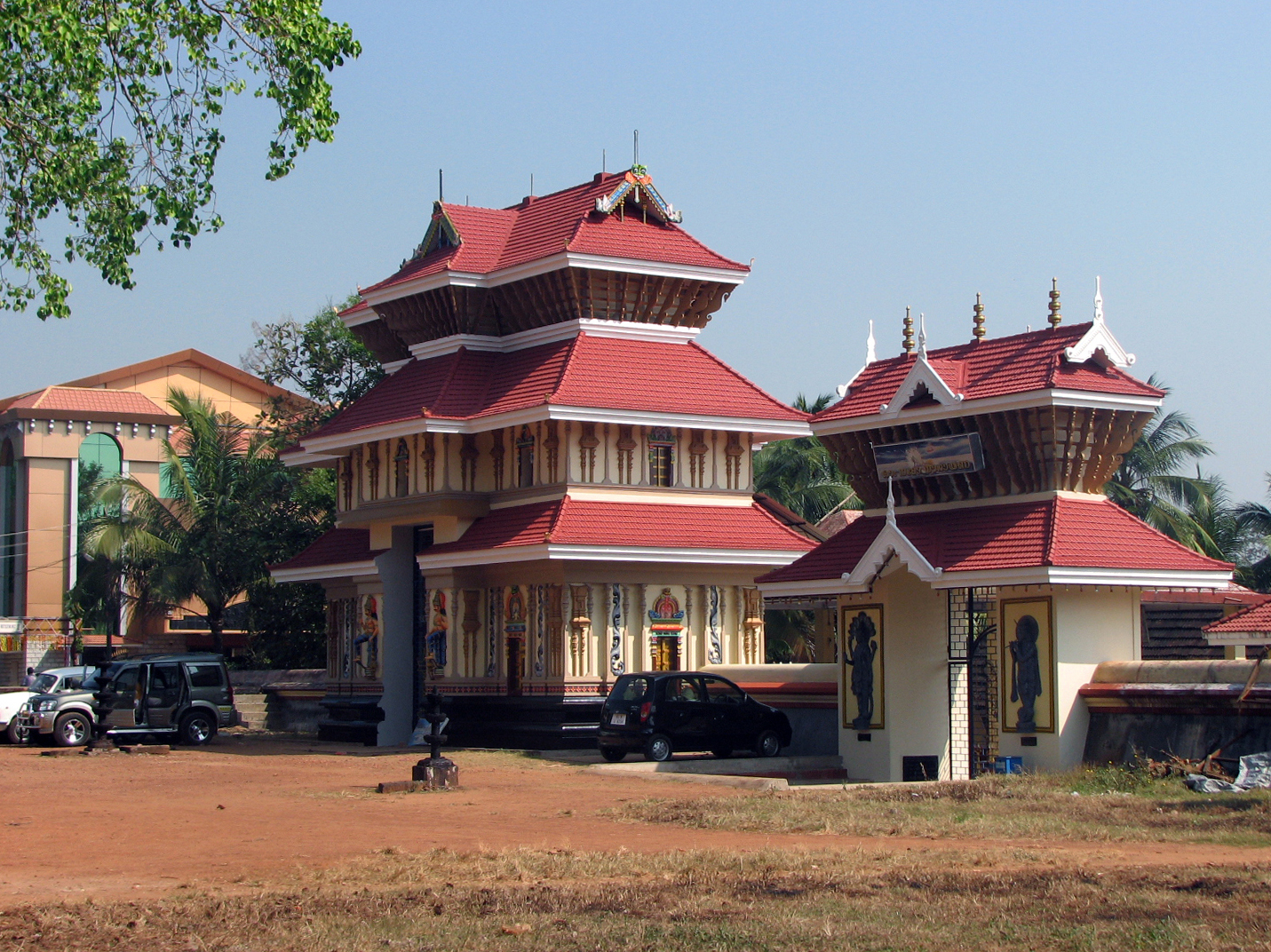
- Main gopurum of the temple

- Mahadeva Temple, Muthuvara, Thrissur, Kerala

Religion
- Affiliation: Hinduism
- District: Thrissur
- Deity: Shiva

Location
- Location: Muthuvara
- State: Kerala
- Country: India
- Interactive map of Muthuvara Mahadeva Temple
- Coordinates: 10.552571°N 76.174916°E

Architecture
- Type: Architecture of Kerala
- Temple: One

Muthuvara Mahadeva Temple (Malayalam: മുതുവറ മഹാദേവക്ഷേത്രം) is a Shiv temple located in Muthuvara, Thrissur city of India. Parashurama, the sixth avatar of Vishnu has installed the idol. The idol is in rowdrabhavam. The temple have one sreekovil for Shiv and another one for Vishnu.
