= K. Saraswathi Amma =

Indian writer (1919–1975)

- Born: 14 April 1919; Kunnappuzha, Thiruvananthapuram, Kerala
- Died: 26 December 1975 (aged 56); Thiruvananthapuram, Kerala
- Occupation: Feminist short story writer
- Writing career
- Language: Malayalam and English
- Years active: 1930–1950

K. Saraswathi Amma (14 April 1919 – 26 December 1975) was a Malayalam feminist writer whose short stories have been anthologised in translation in several American texts. According to critic Jancy James, "In the entire history of women's writing in Kerala, Saraswathi Amma's is the most tragic case of the deliberate neglect of female genius."

== Literary career ==
K. Saraswathi Amma's first short story was published in 1938, followed by 12 volumes of short stories, a novel, and a play. In 1958, a book of essays titled Purushanmarillatha Lokam was published. In her time she was dubbed as a 'man hater,' but later feminist scholars have celebrated her.

J. Devika in her article titled 'Beyond Kulina and Kulata: The Critique of Gender Difference in the Writings of K. Saraswati Amma', in Indian Journal of Gender Studies re-reads the writings of K. Saraswathi Amma, whom she describes "an author marginalised within the Malayalee literary universe and labelled as an incorrigible man-hater." Devika considers her paper an "effort to read her writing as an engagement with the positions taken in the debates around modern gender in the early 20th-century Malayalee public sphere."

A selection of Saraswathi Amma's fiction, some of it translated into English, was published under the title Stories from a forgotten feminist. In the foreword, Jancy James says, "In stories she shattered women's illusions about men and about love, and bitterly attacked patriarchy and tradition, giving her the reputation of being a strident feminist."

== Works ==
=== Novel ===
- Premabhajanam (Darling) - 1944

=== Play ===
- Devaduth (Messenger of God) -1945

=== Short stories ===
- Ponnumkudam (Pot of Gold) - 1946
- SthreeJanmam (Born as a woman) - 1946
- Keezhjeevanakkari (Subjugated woman) - 1949
- Kalamandiram (Temple of art) - 1949
- Penbuddhi (Women's wit) - 1951
- Kanatha Mathil (Thick wall) - 1953
- Prema Pareekshanam (Experiment of love) - 1955
- Chuvanna Pookkal (Red flowers) - 1955
- Cholamarangal (Shady trees) - 1958

=== Collection of essays ===
- Purushanmaarillatha Lokam (A World Without Men) - 1958

=== Posthumously published ===
- Stories from a forgotten feminist
