= Department of Higher Education (Kerala) =

Department responsible for higher education in Kerala

Higher Education Department

Department overview
- Preceding Department: Education Department, Government of Kerala
- Jurisdiction: India Kerala
- Headquarters: Thiruvananthapuram, Kerala, India
- Annual budget: ₹851.46 crore (US$88 million) (2026–27)
- Minister responsible: Roji M. John, Minister for Higher Education
- Department executive: B. Ashok IAS, Principal Secretary (Higher Education) to Government
- Parent department: Government of Kerala
- Child agencies: Directorate of Collegiate Education; Directorate of Technical Education
- Website: highereducation.kerala.gov.in

The Department of Higher Education is an administrative department under the Government of Kerala responsible for formulating policies, implementing programmes, and managing institutions related to higher education in the state. The department oversees universities, government and aided colleges, technical education institutions, professional colleges, and entrance examinations for professional courses in Kerala.

The Higher Education Department was formed to improve the standard of higher education in the state and to ensure coordinated development of university education, technical education, collegiate education, and professional course admissions.

The department headquarters is located in the Government Secretariat at Thiruvananthapuram.

== Leadership ==
The department is headed by a Cabinet Minister of the Government of Kerala, and the current Minister for Higher Education is Roji M. John.

The administration of the department is overseen by the Principal Secretary to Government, an IAS officer. The present Principal Secretary (Higher Education) is Sharmila Mary Joseph IAS. The Principal Secretary is assisted by Additional Secretaries, Joint Secretaries, Deputy Secretaries, Under Secretaries and other Secretariat staff as per the Rules of Business of the Government of Kerala.

== Functions ==
- Formulation and implementation of policies relating to higher education in Kerala
- Administration of Acts and Rules governing higher and technical education institutions in the state
- Supervision of government, aided, and self-financing colleges, universities, professional institutions, and law colleges
- Administration of entrance examinations to professional courses through the Commissioner for Entrance Examinations
- Implementation of state and centrally sponsored schemes relating to higher and technical education

== Line Departments / Subordinate Offices ==
The Department exercises administrative control over the following major line departments and bodies:

- Directorate of Technical Education
- Directorate of Collegiate Education
- Commissionerate of Entrance Examinations (CEE)
- National Cadet Corps (Kerala)
- Government Law Colleges and other professional colleges
- Universities under the administrative control of Higher Education, including:
  - University of Kerala
  - Mahatma Gandhi University, Kerala
  - University of Calicut
  - APJ Abdul Kalam Technological University
  - Sree Sankaracharya University of Sanskrit

(Universities are governed as per their respective Acts and statutes.)

=== Directorate of Collegiate Education ===
This is the government agency responsible for establishing new government colleges, introducing new academic programmes, and managing staff matters of aided colleges, including disbursement of salary to teaching and non-teaching staff.

=== Directorate of Technical Education ===
The Directorate of Technical Education oversees all state institutions imparting technical and professional education, including government engineering colleges, polytechnics, colleges of fine arts, food craft institutes, commercial institutes, technical high schools, and vocational training centres.

=== Commissionerate of Entrance Examinations (CEE) ===
Responsible for conducting entrance examinations and allotting seats to various professional degree courses in Kerala.

=== National Cadet Corps (Kerala) ===
Functions as the state unit of the NCC, providing military training, leadership development, and youth involvement programmes within the educational institutions of Kerala.

The department also exercises administrative oversight over universities and professional institutions under the Higher Education sector in the state.

== Universities and autonomous institutions ==
=== Universities under Higher Education Department ===
Sl. No.	University	Location	Website
1	University of Kerala	Thiruvananthapuram	www.keralauniversity.ac.in
2	APJ Abdul Kalam Technological University (KTU)	Thiruvananthapuram	ktu.edu.in
3	Mahatma Gandhi University, Kerala (MGU)	Kottayam	www.mgu.ac.in
4	Cochin University of Science and Technology (CUSAT)	Kochi	www.cusat.ac.in
5	University of Calicut	Malappuram	www.uoc.ac.in
6	Kannur University	Kannur	www.kannuruniversity.ac.in
7	Thunchath Ezhuthachan Malayalam University	Tirur, Malappuram	www.malayalamuniversity.edu.in
8	Sree Sankaracharya University of Sanskrit	Kalady	ssus.ac.in
9	National University of Advanced Legal Studies (NUALS)	Kochi	www.nuals.ac.in

=== Autonomous Institutions / Bodies ===
Sl. No.	Institution / Body	Type	Website
1	LBS Centre for Science and Technology	Autonomous Institution	lbscentre.kerala.gov.in
2	Institute of Human Resources Development (IHRD)	Autonomous Educational Institution	www.ihrd.ac.in
3	Centre for Continuing Education Kerala (CCEK)	Autonomous Organisation	www.ccek.org
4	Kerala State Centre for Advanced Printing and Training (C-APT)	Government Printing & Training Organisation	www.captkerala.com
5	Kerala State Science and Technology Museum	Science & Technology Museum	www.kstmuseum.in
6	Kerala Council for Historical Research (KCHR)	Research Council	kchr.ac.in
7	National Service Scheme Cell – Kerala	NSS (Higher Education Wing)	nsskerala.org
8	Rashtriya Uchchatar Shiksha Abhiyan (RUSA) – Kerala	Centrally Sponsored Scheme	rusa.education.gov.in
9	Additional Skill Acquisition Programme (ASAP Kerala)	Autonomous Skill Development Agency	asapkerala.gov.in
10	K. R. Narayanan National Institute of Visual Science and Arts	Film & Visual Arts Institute	www.krnnivsa.edu.in
11	Kerala State Higher Education Council	Statutory Council	kshec.kerala.gov.in

== List of Ministers ==
Following is the list of Education Ministers of Kerala before the bifurcation of the Education Department into General Education and Higher Education:

Sl. No.	Minister	Term	Party	Chief Minister
1	Joseph Mundassery	1957–1959	CPI	E. M. S. Namboodiripad
2	P. P. Ummer Koya	1960–1962	INC	Pattom A. Thanu Pillai
3	R. Sankar	1962–1964	INC	R. Sankar
4	C. H. Mohammed Koya	1967–1969	IUML	E. M. S. Namboodiripad
5	C. H. Mohammed Koya	1969–1970	IUML	C. Achutha Menon
6	C. H. Mohammed Koya	1970–1973	IUML	C. Achutha Menon
7	Chakkeeri Ahmed Kutty	1973–1977	IUML	C. Achutha Menon
8	C. H. Mohammed Koya	Mar 1977 – Apr 1977	IUML	K. Karunakaran
9	C. H. Mohammed Koya	1977–1978	IUML	A. K. Antony
10	U. A. Beeran	Jan 1978 – Oct 1978	IUML	A. K. Antony
11	C. H. Mohammed Koya	Oct 1979 – Dec 1979	IUML	C. H. Mohammed Koya
12	Baby John	1980–1981	RSP	E. K. Nayanar
13	P. J. Joseph	1981–1982	Kerala Congress	K. Karunakaran
14	T. M. Jacob	1982–1987	Kerala Congress (Jacob)	K. Karunakaran
15	K. Chandrasekharan	1987–1991	—	E. K. Nayanar
16	E. T. Mohammed Basheer	1991–1995	IUML	K. Karunakaran
17	E. T. Mohammed Basheer	1995–1996	IUML	A. K. Antony
18	P. J. Joseph	1996–2001	Kerala Congress	E. K. Nayanar
19	Nalakath Soopy	2001–2004	IUML	A. K. Antony
20	E. T. Mohammed Basheer	2004–2006	IUML	Oommen Chandy
21	M. A. Baby	2006–2011	CPI(M)	V. S. Achuthanandan
22	P. K. Abdu Rabb	2011–2016	IUML	Oommen Chandy

List of Higher Education Ministers of Kerala (since bifurcation in 2016)
Sl. No.	Image	Minister	Term	Party	Chief Minister
1		K. T. Jaleel	2016–2021	LDF (Independent)	Pinarayi Vijayan
2		R. Bindu	2021–2026	CPI(M)	Pinarayi Vijayan
3		Roji M. John	2026–Incumbent	INC	V. D. Satheesan

== See also ==
- Department of General Education (Kerala)
- Government of Kerala
- Education in Kerala
