= St. Teresa's College =

Woman's College in India

Coordinates: 9.976°N 76.279°E

St. Teresa's College, Kochi
- Motto: "The fear of the Lord is the beginning of Wisdom"
- Type: Aided Women's college
- Established: 1925; 101 years ago
- Founder: St. Teresa of St. Rose of Lima
- Affiliations: Mahatma Gandhi University
- Principal: Dr. Anu Joseph
- Website: teresas.ac.in

St. Teresa's College is an autonomous women's college located at Kochi, Kerala, India, formed under the patronage of the Archdiocese of Verapoly.

== History ==
The college was established on 15 June 1925, as the first Women's College of the erstwhile Cochin State, by the congregation of the Carmelite sisters of St. Teresa.

== Academic programmes ==
St. Teresa offers undergraduates and postgraduate programmes in arts and science affiliated to the Mahatma Gandhi University. The college has been accredited by National Assessment and Accreditation Council with the highest A++ Grade (CGPA 3.57 out of 4). The college is ranked 60th among colleges in India by the National Institutional Ranking Framework (NIRF) in 2025.

== Departments ==
- Botany
- Chemistry
- Zoology
- Physics
- Commerce
- Computer Applications
- Communicative English
- Economics
- English
- French
- History
- Home Science
- Psychology
- Management Studies
- Fashion Design
- Language
- Mathematics and Statistics
- Physical Education
- Sociology
- Apparel and Fashion Designing
- Women Study Centre
- Bharatnatyam

== Notable alumni ==
- K. R. Gowri Amma, former minister in Kerala Government
- Leela Damodara Menon, Former Member, Rajya Sabha
- Late Mercy Ravi, Former member, Kerala Legislative Assembly
- Late Prof. Mercy Williams, Former Mayor of Cochin
- Dr. Jancy James, Vice Chancellor, Central University of Kerala
- Justice. Anu Sivaraman, Hon. Judge, High Court of Kerala
- Vijayalakshmi, poet
- Tessa Joseph, actress
- Accamma Cherian, Independence activist
- Asin Thottumkal, actress
- Ranjini Haridas, television anchor, actress
- Amala Paul, actress
- Samvrutha Sunil, actress
- Poornima Indrajith, actress, anchor, designer, entrepreneur
- Meera Nandan, actress, radio jockey
- Divya Unni, actress
- Lissy, actress, entrepreneur
- Sujatha Mohan, playback singer
- Radhika Thilak, playback singer
- Elizabeth Susan Koshy, shooter
- RJ Renu, RJ/VJ & actress
- Unni Mary, actress
- Rani Chandra, actress
- Dhanya Mary Varghese, actress, dancer
- Aparna Nair, actress
- Anna Katharina Valayil, playback singer
- Rajalakshmy, playback singer
- Namitha Pramod, actress
- Prayaga Martin, actress
- Soumya Ramakrishnan, playback singer
- Aswathi Menon, actress
- Rebecca Santhosh, actress
- Sanusha Santhosh, actress
- Anna Ben, actress
- Remya Nambeesan, actress
- Bhama, actress
- Mrudula Murali, anchor, actress
- Malavika Nair, actress, Lecturer
- Niranjana Anoop, actress
- Prarthana Indrajith, singer
