= Rajagiri =

Institute of Higher Education

Coordinates: 10.05261°N 76.31653°E

Rajagiri Vidyapeetham
- Motto: Learn, Serve and Excel
- Type: Private
- Established: 2001
- Founder: Carmelites of Mary Immaculate
- Accreditation: UGC; AICTE
- Religious affiliation: Syro Malabar Catholic
- Academic affiliations: Mahatma Gandhi University, Kerala; APJ Abdul Kalam Technological University
- President: Fr Dr Jose Kuriedath CMI
- Superintendent: Rev. Fr. Saju Madavanakkad CMI, PhD
- Director: Fr. Dr. Mathew Vattathara CMI
- Students: 4000
- Location: Kochi, India
- Campus: Urban
- Colors: Dark orange, light grey, maroon and blue
- Website: www.rajagiri.edu

Rajagiri is a private Christian minority higher education institution of the Carmelites of Mary Immaculate (CMI), an indigenous Syro-Malabar Catholic religious congregation founded in 1831. It is located in Rajagiri Valley, Kakkanad, Kochi.

The campus was acquired after Indian independence and subsequently developed by the Sacred Heart Province of the CMI congregation. The literal meaning of Raja Giri in the Malayalam language (the vernacular of the people in Kerala) is the Hill of the King, where the King refers to God.

Nowadays, Rajagiri is synonymous with Sacred Heart Province of the CMI congregation and its many social and educational institutions. CMI educational missions to date is a vast network of 448 institutions: over 200 schools, 14 university affiliated colleges, an engineering college, 12 technical institutes, a university, a medical college, 3 teacher training colleges, 5 special schools, 18 non formal educational institutions and 17 cultural centres which are spread all over India and a few located abroad.

Due to constraints in space for the expansion of its various initiatives at the Kalamaserry campus, Rajagiri has extended into a new 90-acre (360,000 m^{2}) campus on the banks of the Chitrapuzha river. This location is now called Rajagiri Valley, and is where Rajagiri has begun establishing a national science, arts and technology university – Rajagiri Vidyapeetham. It has tied up with a leading Kochi based property developer - RDS Projects Limited, to develop a modern university township.

== History ==
When the CMI congregation was divided into three provinces in 1953, the central region of Kerala, more or less coextensive with the territory of the then archdiocese of Ernakulam which exists today as the Ernakulam - Angamaly Archdiocese and the Kothamangalam the king Diocese, was constituted into Sacred Heart Province.

When the province was established, it had its headquarters in Aluva (which is presently the St. Antony's Monastery, Aluva). In 1959, it shifted to Rajagiri in Kalamassery. The Sacred Heart province was then onwards known as the Rajagiri province.

In 2008–2009, the provincial synaxis of the Sacred Heart province decided to acknowledge the growing importance of Kochi in global scenario by emphasizing it as "Sacred Heart province, Kochi" or "Rajagiri Province, Kochi".

== Academics ==
Rajagiri institutions offer undergraduate, postgraduate and doctoral programmes in the social sciences, management, engineering and related disciplines.

Rajagiri College of Social Sciences (RCSS) offers programmes in social work, computer science, commerce, management, psychology, library and information science, statistics and related fields. Its programmes include BSW, BBA, BCom, BSc Psychology, MCA, MSW, MBA and postgraduate and doctoral programmes."Academics". Rajagiri College of Social Sciences."Rajagiri College of Social Sciences". Rajagiri College of Social Sciences.

The Rajagiri Centre for Business Studies (RCBS) represents the management programmes offered by Rajagiri College of Social Sciences and Rajagiri Business School. Its principal programmes include the Master of Business Administration (MBA), MA in Human Resource Management (MA in HRM), Post Graduate Diploma in Management (PGDM) and the Fellow Programme in Management (FPM)."Rajagiri Centre for Business Studies". Rajagiri Centre for Business Studies.

Rajagiri School of Engineering & Technology (RSET) offers undergraduate, postgraduate and doctoral programmes in engineering and technology. Its academic departments include applied electronics and instrumentation, artificial intelligence and data science, civil engineering, computer science and engineering, computer science and business systems, electrical and electronics engineering, electronics and communication engineering, information technology and mechanical engineering."Rajagiri School of Engineering & Technology". Rajagiri School of Engineering & Technology.

Its flagship institution, the Rajagiri College of Social Sciences, was established in 1955 at Rajagiri in Kalamassery. The Rajagiri Higher Secondary School was founded in 1964. The continuous quality and balance of the school's curricular instruction and extracurricular activities has made it the most sought after school in the Ernakulam district. Rajagiri has established its presence in the Middle-East through its collaboration in bringing up Rajagiri International School, Dubai. Rajagiri province is now collaborating with Confident Group, a major Indian business conglomerate, in establishing a campus of the school at the Confident Canopus township in Bangalore (The deal has been paused, for now).

== Faculties and Institutions ==
The Rajagiri vidyapeetham is envisaged as a wide network of institutions and centers providing quality education from the pre-primary level to doctoral recognition through specialised and super-specialised study, and seeking alternatives to the conventional mainstream efforts. As of late 2009, the institutions that come under the common umbrella of Rajagiri Vidyapeetham are:

- Sacred Heart College
- Rajagiri College of Social Sciences
- Rajagiri School of Engineering & Technology
- Rajagiri Educational Charitable Trust-IGNO
- Rajagiri School of Computer Science
- Rajagiri School of Library and Information Sciences
- Rajagiri School of Management
- Rajagiri Business School
- Rajagiri Centre for Business Studies
- Rajagiri International School of Education and Research
- Rajagiri College of Management and Applied Sciences
- Rajagiri High School
- Rajagiri Public School & Kindergarten
- Rajagiri Christu Jayanthi Public School
- Viswajyothi Public School
- Rajagiri Amala CMI Public School
- Mithradam Renewable Energy Centre
- Rajagiri Viswajyothi College of Arts & Applied Sciences
- Rajagiri Public School, Doha, Qatar

The students from these institutions identify themselves as 'Rajagirians'.

In 2009, the Government of India's National Commission for Minorities granted the Rajagiri Vidyapeetham with Minority Institution status. This gives Rajagiri the privilege to exercise the special rights and safeguards provided to minorities by the Constitution of India. According to the 2001 Census of India, the population of Christians in India accounts for only 2.3% of its total population.

The Indira Gandhi National Open University (IGNOU), through the Rajagiri Educational Charitable Trust (RECT) and Rajagiri School of Engineering & Technology, provides post graduate level courses and training to professionals in the industry and faculty in academia. The program features the facility to receive the degree of Master of Technology (M.Tech.) in Embedded System Design or Information Systems Security of IGNOU by completing the full credit requirements on a part-time basis. This is in addition to the regular full-time 2 year master's degrees in VLSI & Embedded Systems and Computer Science & Information Systems.

The Rajagiri School of Engineering & Technology houses India's most advanced laboratory in Process Control. Training and research is conducted with support from Kochi Refineries Limited (KRL), Fertilizer And Chemicals Travancore Limited (FACT), Yokogawa Electric, Honeywell Automation & Control Solutions and National Instruments.

=== Rajagiri International School of Education and Research ===
From its inception, Rajagiri International School of Education and Research (RISER) has forged collaborative initiatives in research and especially education with the State University of New York, Western Michigan University, Gannon University in the United States, James Cook University in Australia, Royal Melbourne Institute of Technology University, Australian Catholic University, Assumption University in Thailand and the University of Wales. Besides regular faculty exchange programs, conclaves, and conducting international bilateral programmes, these universities recognize the course credits earned at RSET, RSOM or RISER towards earning a bachelor's degree in engineering at their respective universities. In order to facilitate RISER operations in Australia, an entity - Rajagiri Australia has been initiated in 2008.

== Ranking ==
Beginning with the first batch of undergraduates and postgraduate students, RSET and RSOM have both recorded high industry placement. Both institutes beginning from 2006, have figured in the national rankings despite being established only recently. The RSOM is consistently ranked in the top 25 of Indian business schools, while RSET has been among the top 50 in including NASSCOM and DataQuest's combined rankings of over 400 government and private technology schools in India.

RSET has been ranked first in the state of Kerala by the REC Calicut Alumni Association (RECCA) in the category of self-financing colleges.

RSET placed in the first position in the survey conducted by NITCAA among the Self-financing Private Engineering Colleges in Kerala in 2010

== See also ==
- Sacred Heart College, Thevara
- Rajagiri Hospital
- Rajagiri School of Engineering & Technology
- Rajagiri College of Social Sciences
