= T. Geenakumari =

Indian lawyer and politician

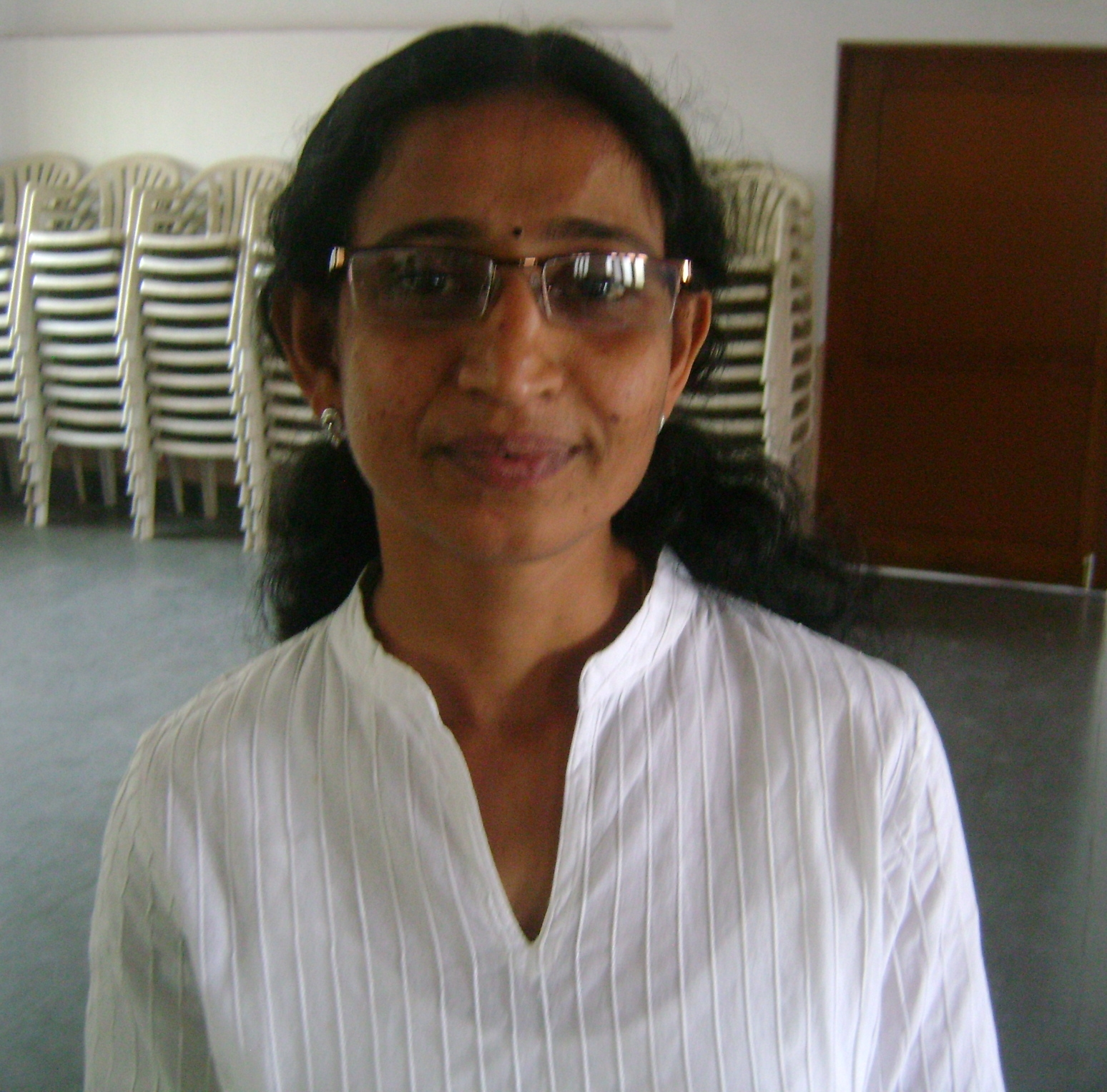

Director, Kerala State Women’s Development Corporation

Personal details
- Born: May 21, 1975 (age 51) Muthuvila, Kallara, Thiruvananthapuram, Kerala, India
- Party: CPI(M)
- Education: Nilamel NSS College; Kerala Law Academy Law College (LLB); National University of Advanced Legal Studies, Kochi (PhD)
- Occupation: Advocate, politician, student leader

T. Geenakumari (born 21 May 1975) is a student leader, advocate and politician from Kerala. She was a central committee member and vice president of the Student's Federation of India (SFI) in Kerala.

== Life and career ==
Geenakumari was born on 21 May 1975 to Thankappan Pillai and Indira Pillai. She is from Muthuvila village in Kallara Panchayat, Thiruvananthapuram district. Her father, Pillai, was a member of the CPI (M) of the Kallara local committee. She went to Nilamel NSS College and completed an LLB at Kerala Law Academy Law College at Thiruvanathapuram. She also did a PhD in law from the National University of Advanced Legal Studies, Kochi.

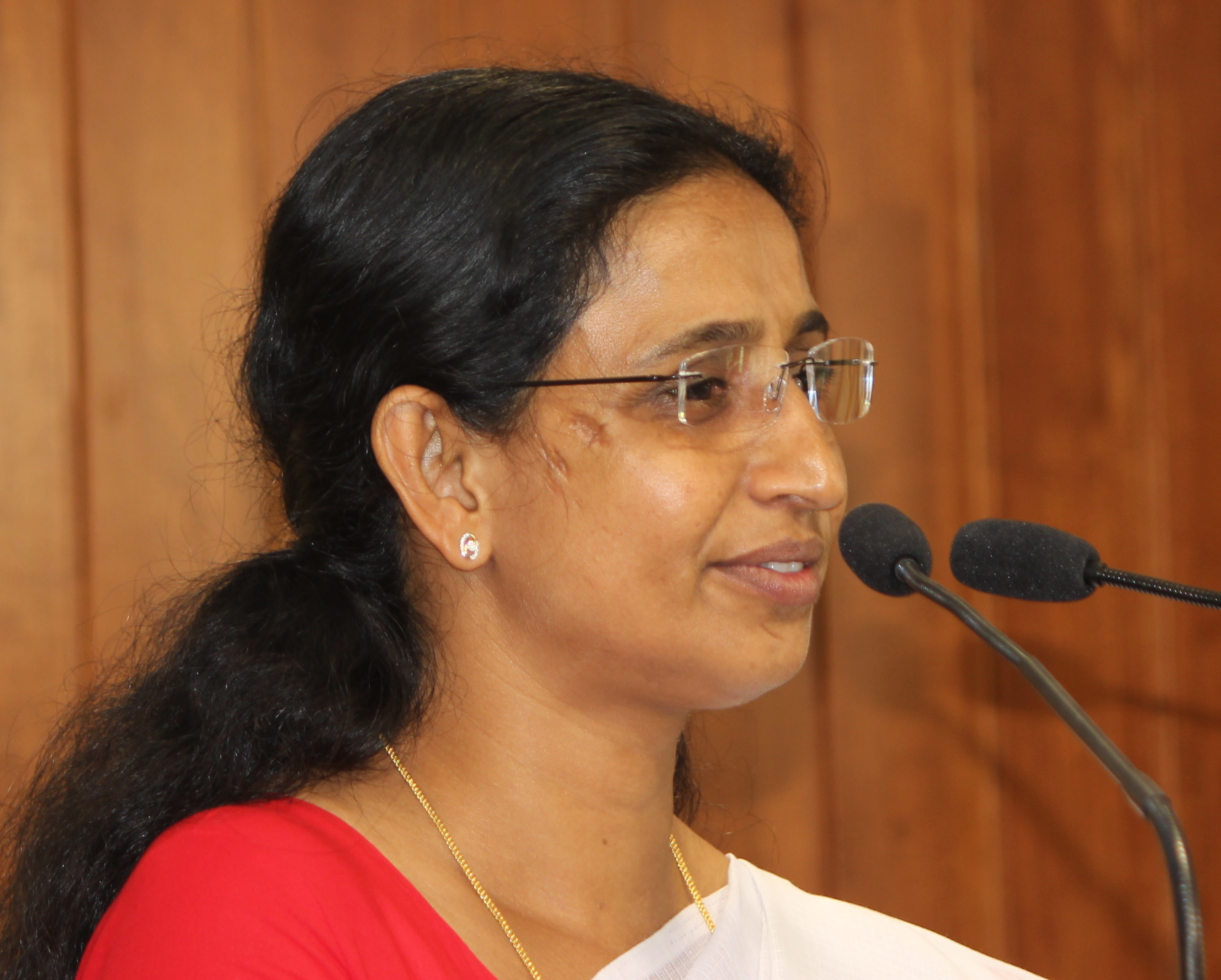
Geenakumari in 2018

She started her political life as a student leader. She was an active member of SFI in her college life and also served as office bearer. She is a practicing advocate and also a district government pleader.

In October 2023, she received an apology from a policeman who hit her during a lathi charge 29 years ago during a student protest in November 1994.

She also served as the director of the Kerala State Women’s Development Corporation.

== Criticism ==
The Thiruvananthapuram City police filed a complaint with the State Police Chief against Public Prosecutor T. Geena Kumari for failing effectively to oppose the bail application of a key accused involved in assaulting Enforcement Directorate officials. Investigators alleged that Kumari ignored a police report and actively contradicted the team's position by allowing the accused to secure bail before crucial evidence, including the assault weapon, could be recovered. Police report, which outlines 13 reasons to deny bail, was submitted to the court on the 18th of this month. Following claims that the prosecution effectively aided the accused, the police department initiated recommendations to appoint a special public prosecutor to take over the case.
