= Kandathil Sebastian =

Indian writer

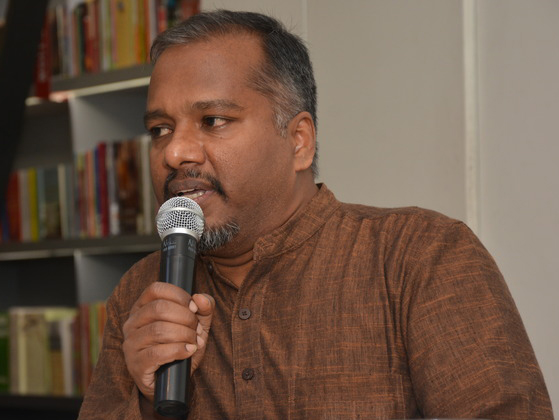
- Born: 16 June 1966 (age 60); Ezhacherry, Kottayam, Kerala
- Occupation: Writer
- Writing career
- Period: 1966–present

Kandathil Sebastian is the author of two bestselling novels: Dolmens in the Blue Mountain (2013) and Wisdom of the White Mountain (2014).

Sebastian lives in Delhi and was born in Kerala State, India. He holds a master's degree in Social Work and a PhD in Public Health from Jawaharlal Nehru University, New Delhi. He has worked in the health and development sector since 1989. He is also a writer of public health-related articles.

== Life and career ==
Born in Kottayam, studied in Mahatma Gandhi University, Kottayam and Jawaharlal Nehru University, New Delhi. He currently works in the Social Development sector in India.
