= RJ Renu =

Indian radio jockey

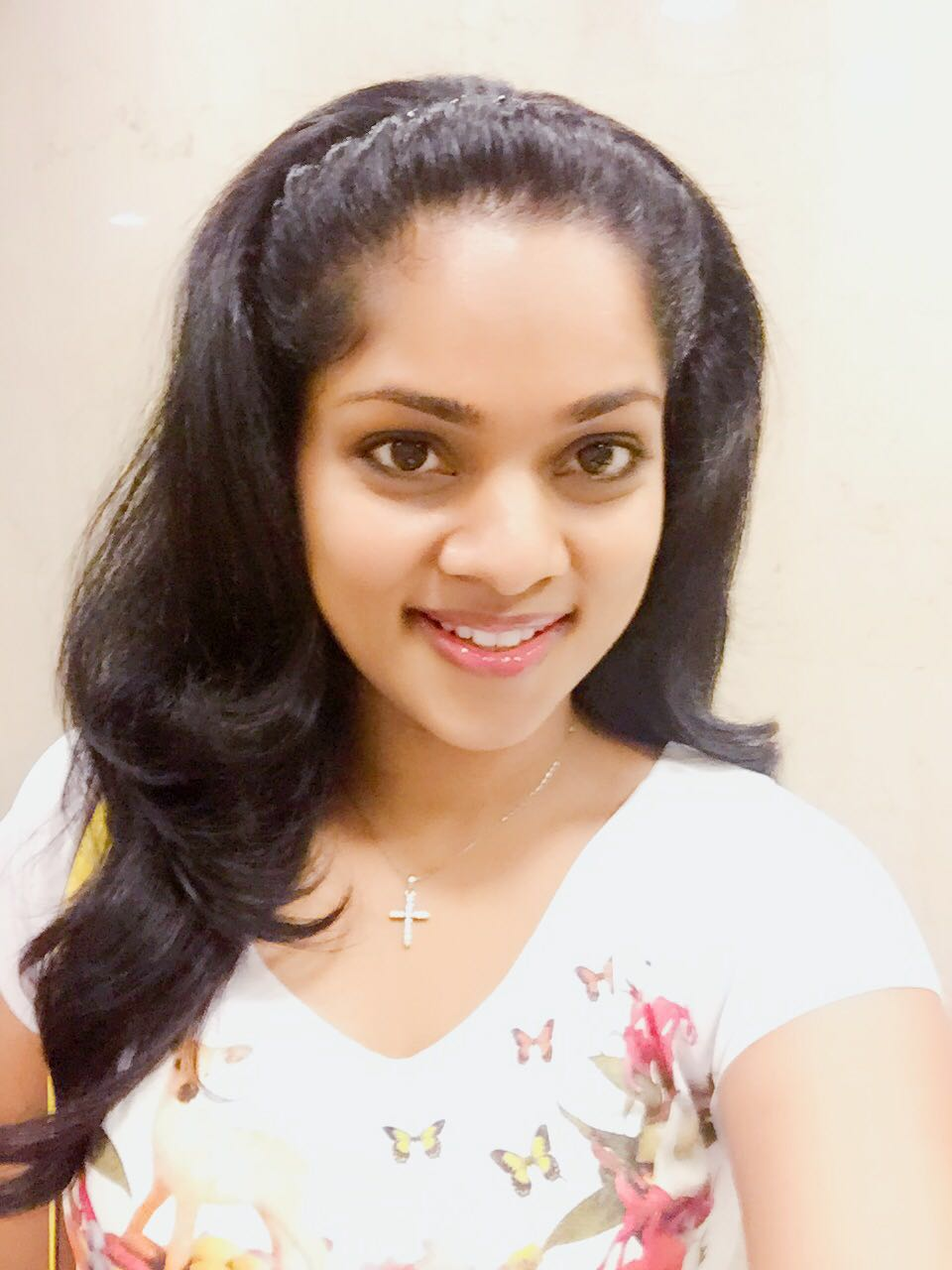
- Born: Renu Joseph Elenjical; Kothamangalam, Kerala
- Other names: RJ VJ Renu; Love Bytes Renu
- Occupations: Radio jockey Video jockey Sports Anchor; Sports Commentator; News Presenter
- Years active: 2007–present
- Known for: Love Bytes (Kappa TV); Star Jam (Club FM)

Renu Joseph popularly known as RJ Renu, is an Indian radio jockey, video jockey, TEDx speaker, sports presenter, and celebrity interviewer based in Kochi, Kerala. She is best known as the host of the Club FM 94.3/104.8 show Love Bytes that ran for eight years, on radio and TV simultaneously, and also for being the sports presenter in Jio Cinema for FIFA 2022 World cup Malayalam stream.

== Early life ==
Renu completed the BA degree in communicative English (Journalism and Advertising) from St. Teresa's College, Ernakulam, and MBA from Rajagiri College of Social Sciences before choosing a career as video jockey and radio jockey.

== Career ==
Renu had her first break as the host of Kairali TV's Hello Good Evening as a replacement for the actress Remya Nambeesan and later continued with the shows Spicy India for Asianet Plus and Dream Home for Asianet News. She then joined the Mathrubhumi group as radio jockey as the host of the Club FM 94.3/104.8 show Love Bytes. The show became a huge success, prompting the makers to convert it to a TV show with the same name for Kappa TV. She also does Tube Grid, a show about viral videos on the same channel, and Star Jam, a celebrity chat show on Club FM 94.3/104.8.

She was also the host for FIFA 2022 World Cup at Jio Cinemas live Malayalam streaming service.

She does a celebrity interview show The Uncensored Show in Radio Mirchi Malayalam.

== Radio Host ==
Show	Channel	Topic
Love Bytes	Club FM 94.3/104.8, (Kerala, India)	Love and relationships
Star Jam	Club FM 94.3/104.8, (Kerala, India)	Celebrity chat
Uncensored	Radio Rasam-online radio, (UAE)	Relationships
Mornings with Renu	Radio Mirchi-online radio, (Qatar, Bahrain)	Morning drive time show
Crazy love	Radio Mirchi 104 FM, (Kerala, India)	Love and relationships
The Uncensored Show (Radio version)	Radio Mirchi 104 FM, (Kerala, India)	Celebrity interviews

== Television host ==
Show	channel	Topic
Hello Good Evening	Kairali TV	Phone in program
Spicy India	Asianet Plus	Lifestyle show
Dream Home	Asianet News	Reality show
Master Craft	Mathrubhumi News	Reality show
Love Bytes	Kappa TV	Music show
Tube Grid	Kappa TV	
Dine Out With Celebrities	Kappa TV	Chat show
Face of the week	Kappa TV	Fashion
FIFA 2022 World Cup Malayalam stream	Jio Cinema	Football
IPL Auction 2022-23	Jio Cinema	Cricket
IPL Match Centre 2022-23 Malayalam stream	Jio Cinema	Cricket
IPL Match Centre 2023-24 Malayalam stream	Jio Star	Cricket
IPL Match Centre 2024-25 Malayalam stream	Jio Star	Cricket
News Presenter	BIG TV	Live news

== Podcast ==
Show	Platform
Crazy Love by RJ Renu	Mirchi Plus
RJ Renu Malayalam Podcast	Spotify, Apple Podcast, Gaana

== Social media ==
Show	Media	Topic
The Uncensored Show	Mirchi Malayalam, YouTube	Celebrity interviews
Crazy Love (Malayalam version)	Instagram TV (IGTV)	Love and relationships
Crazy Love (English version)	YouTube	Love and relationships
