= Inflore =

"Infloré 2026 – Registration". makemypass.com. Inflore is a national level two-day management fest conducted by Rajagiri Centre for Business Studies. Inflore is a combination of management and non-management events. The word takes its origins from the French language and Infloré means 'To bloom'. The fest happens on the RCBS campus, Kakkanad every year with different themes. The Inflore is fully managed by students under the guidance of faculty members.

== Infloré 2026 ==
The 20th edition of Infloré, a national-level management fest organized by Rajagiri Centre for Business Studies, is scheduled to be held on 16 and 17 January 2026 at the Kakkanad campus. The fest continues to feature a mix of management and non-management events, attracting student participation from across the country.

For the 2026 edition, ticketing and registration were handled by MakeMyPass.

== Infloré 2023 ==
Infloré 23 is the 19th edition of the grand annual management fest which is set to take place on 13 and 14 October 2023. It will comprise 16 Management and Non-Management events for Undergraduate and Postgraduate students. The theme for Infloré 23 is "Bellona: Viva España Verde" which symbolizes the Goddess of War. The theme was unveiled by the film crew of the upcoming Malayalam movie "Theepori Benny". The event was organized at the RBS auditorium on the Rajagiri valley campus, Kakkanad. The flag drop drown event which has become a recent tradition among the students was initiated by the film crew of Malayalam movie 'Kasargold'.

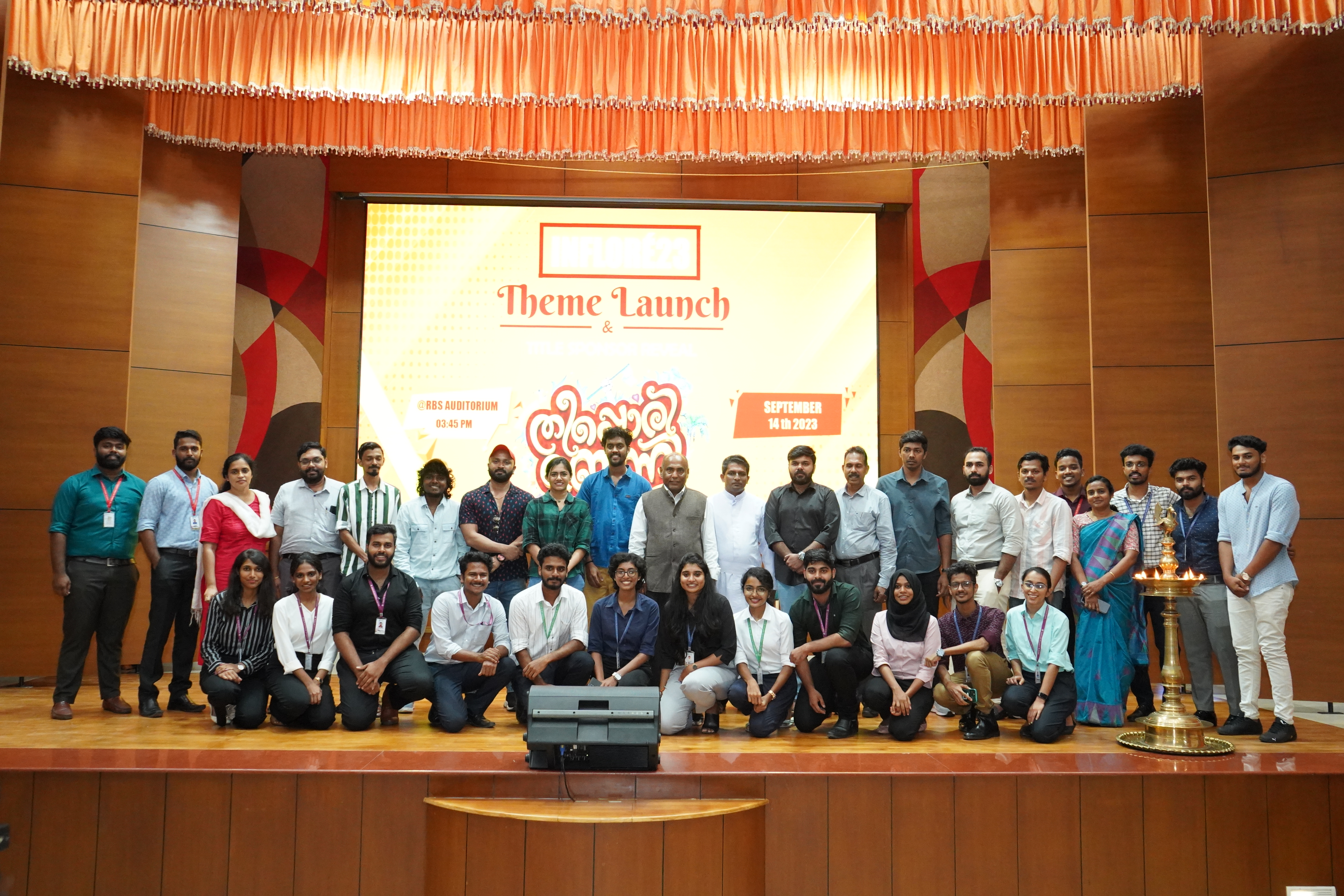
Infloré 23 Theme Launch & Title Partner reveal event with the Film crew of "Theepori Benny"

As part of the upcoming management fest, students from the campus organized a beach cleaning program at Fort Kochi Beach. The theme of the year 'Bellona: Viva España Verde!, is a call to Spain's colorful festivals, art, music, and culinary delights while forging a deeper bond with nature and adopting eco-friendly habits. This is very well explained by the beach cleaning campaign hosted by the Students.

== Infloré 2022 ==
Infloré 2022 witnessed a record level of participation in the history of Infloré. It was conducted on 14 and 15 October 2022. The theme of the fest was the "Iris" Bridge of Hues. The theme launch was done in the presence of the movie crews and casts of the films Pathonpatham Nootandu & Saturday Night. The overall championship was won by Christ University Bangalore and the award was given to them in the presence of Actor Tini Tom. Day one concluded with an In-house Fashion-show and Day two Concluded with a Live band performance from Pagli.

== Inflore 2021 ==
Inflore 2021, the 16th edition marked a history by conducting a management fest online for the first time. With participation from foreign nationals, it was a year when Inflore became truly international. The event was conducted online from 12 to 17 February 2021.

== Inflore 2019 ==
The 15th edition of Rajagiri Inflore was conducted on 5 and 6 December 2019.

== Inflore 2018 ==
The 14th edition of Rajagiri Inflore was conducted on 5 and 6 October 2018. The theme of Inflore 2018 was 'The Thousand Spotlights'. Christ University won the overall championship. Students of Rajagiri supported the Chendamangalam weavers by selling Chekutty dolls during the two days of Inflore which were made by the students itself.

== Inflore 2017 ==
The 13th edition of Rajagiri Inflore was conducted on 6 and 7 October 2017. The theme of Inflore 2017 was 'The Roar'. The overall championship was won by K.L.E. Society's College of Business Administration, Lingaraj College, Belgaum.

== Inflore 2016 ==
The 12th edition of Rajagiri Inflore was conducted on 28 and 29 October 2016. The theme of Inflore 2016 was 'That 90's magic'. The overall championship was won by SCMS Cochin School of Business.

== Ticketing Partners ==
- 2026 – Ticketing and registration handled by MakeMyPass.
