= Rajagiri School of Engineering & Technology (Autonomous) =

Autonomous College for Studies

- Motto: Learn, Serve and Excel
- Type: Private, Self-financing Engineering Institution
- Established: 2001
- Founder: Carmelites of Mary Immaculate (CMI)
- Parent institution: Rajagiri
- Affiliations: APJ Abdul Kalam Technological University
- Principal: Rev. Dr. Jaison Paul Mulerikkal CMI
- Director: Rev. Dr. Prasant Payyappilly Palakkappilly CMI
- Faculty: 225
- Students: 3,975
- Undergraduates: 3800
- Postgraduates: 100
- Doctoral students: 75
- Location: Kochi, Kerala, 682039, India; 9.9932°N 76.3584°E
- Campus: 28.73 Acres
- Language: English
- Website: www.rajagiritech.ac.in

- Location within Kerala

Rajagiri School of Engineering & Technology (Autonomous) (RSET) is an educational institution located in Kochi, Kerala, India, offering engineering education and research. RSET is affiliated to APJ Abdul Kalam Technological University and approved by the All India Council for Technical Education (AICTE).

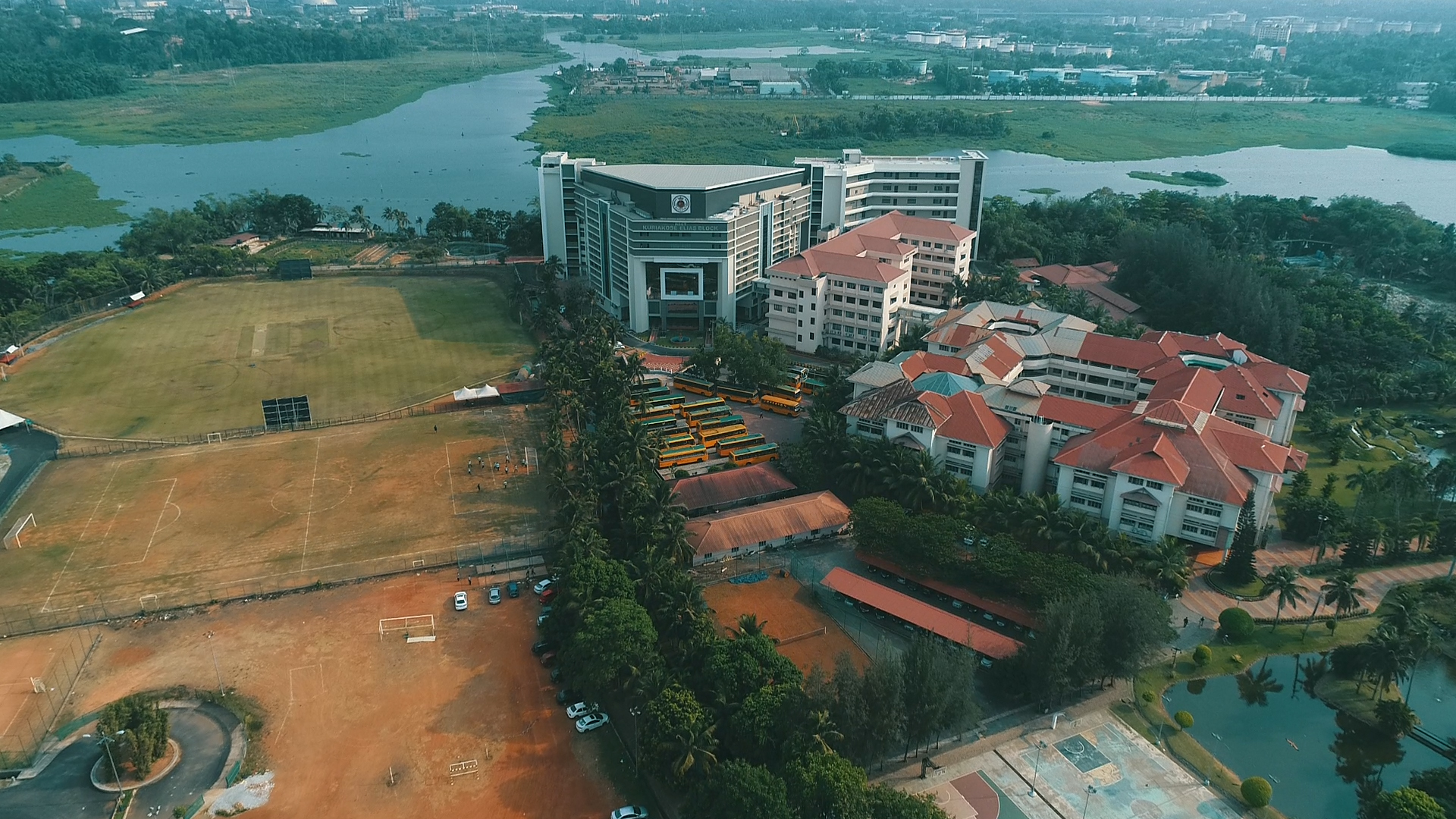
Rajagiri Campus

RSET is managed by the Sacred Heart Province of the Carmelites of Mary Immaculate (CMI) congregation. RSET is a part of the Rajagiri Vidyapeetham (transl. "seat of knowledge").

In 2020, the college was granted autonomous status by the University Grants Commission, being among the first technical institutions in Kerala to have such a status. Accredited with an 'A' grade by NAAC in its second cycle, seven out of RSET's nine undergraduate programs are accredited under NBA Tier 1 accreditation. RSET is ranked in the National Institutional Ranking Framework (NIRF) for 2020 and 2022 by the Ministry of Education, Government of India. 1st amongst private engg. colleges in Kerala Institutional Ranking Framework 2024. The institution also offers postgraduate programmes in engineering and research programmes (Ph.D.) in science and engineering.

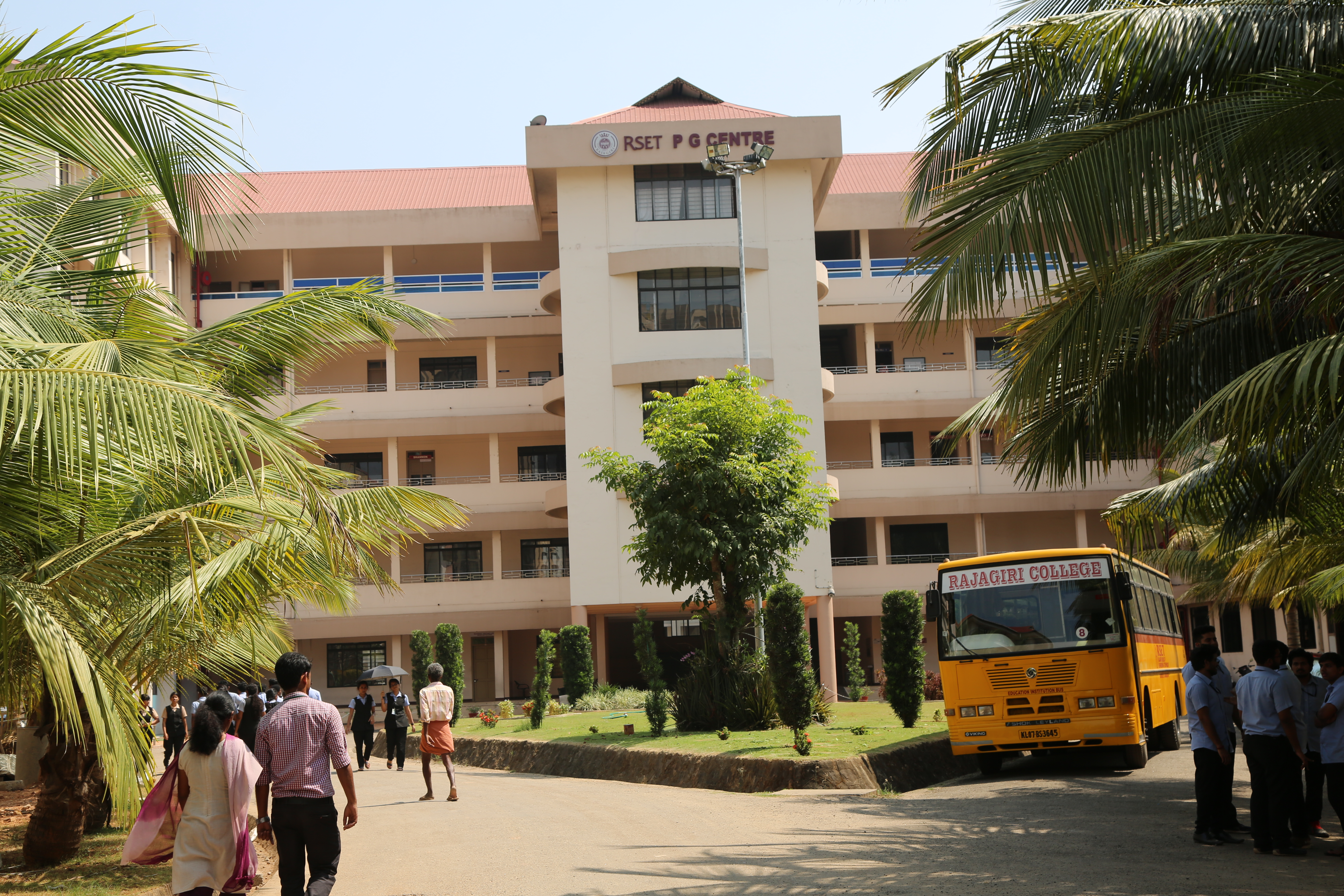
RSET PG Center

== Courses offered ==
RSET offers undergraduate programmes in B. Tech and postgraduate programmes in M. Tech and Ph. D. levels.

B. Tech:

- Applied Electronics and Instrumentation Engineering
- Artificial Intelligence and Data Science
- Civil Engineering
- Computer Science and Engineering
- Computer Science and Business Systems
- Electrical and Electronics Engineering
- Electronics and Communication Engineering
- Information Technology
- Mechanical Engineering

From 2021, the college, in collaboration with Tata Consultancy Services, provides Computer Science & Business Systems undergraduate program.

M. Tech:

- Computer Science and Engineering
- Computer Science and Information Systems
- Computer Science and Engineering (Artificial Intelligence and Machine Learning)
- Data Sciences
- VLSI & Embedded Systems

Ph. D.

- Chemistry
- Civil Engineering
- Computer Science
- Electrical Engineering
- Electronics Engineering
- Information Technology
- Mathematics
- Mechanical Engineering
- Physics

=== Accreditation ===
- Seven B.Tech programmes at RSET have been accredited with Tier 1 status by the National Board of Accreditation (NBA).
- RSET is accredited with an 'A' grade by the National Assessment and Accreditation Council (NAAC).

=== Rankings ===
RSET is ranked in the National Institutional Ranking Framework (NIRF) for 2020 and 2022 by the Ministry of Education, Government of India.

== Notable alumni ==
- Shane Nigam, Malayalam Film Actor
- Jakes Bejoy, Malayalam Film Song Composer, Music Producer and Singer
- Kalesh Ramanand, Malayalam Film Actor
