= List of polytechnic colleges in Kerala =

There are numerous public and private polytechnic colleges in the Indian state of Kerala.

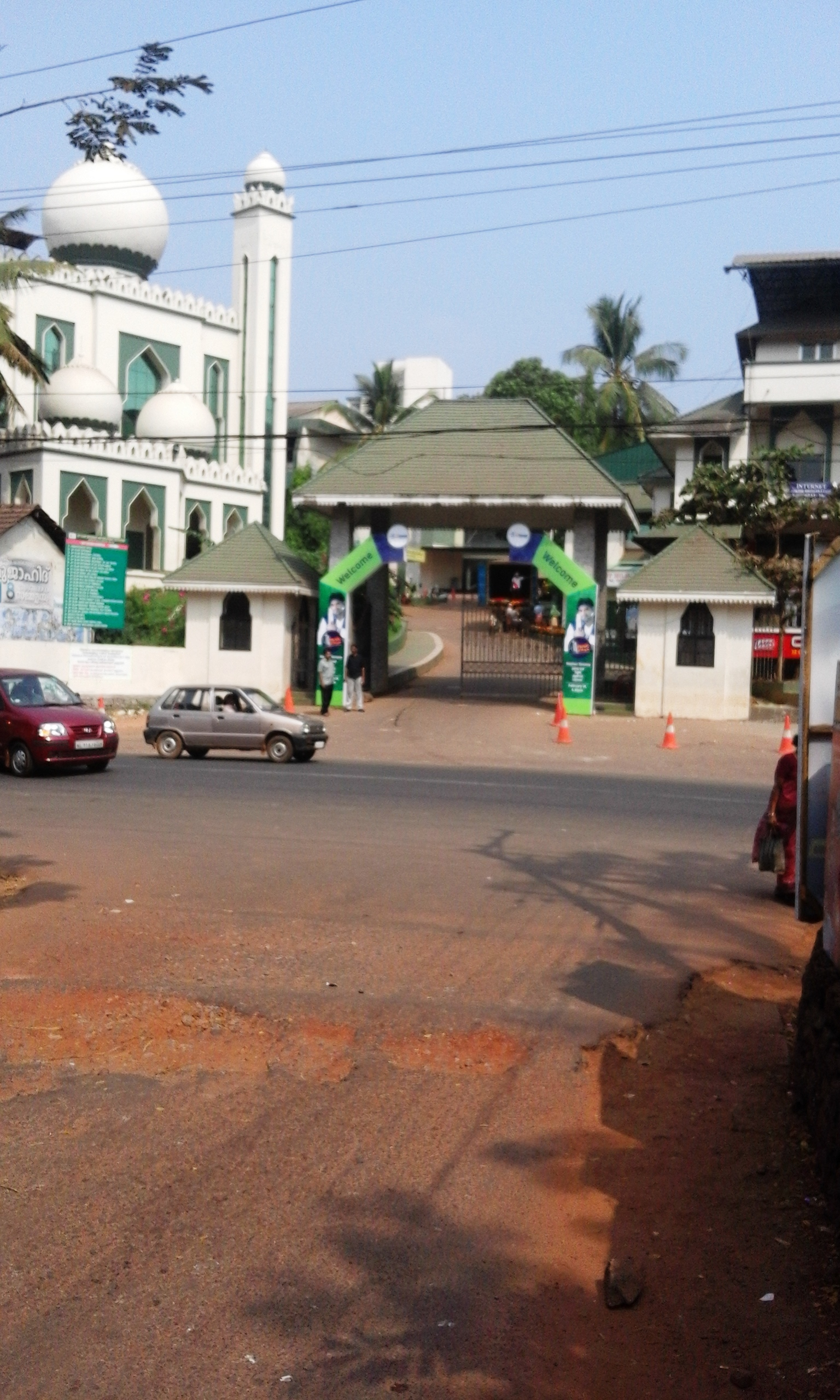
JDT Orphanage Polytechnic, Kozhikode

- Model Residential Polytechnic College, Kuzhalmannam, Palakkad
- Kerala Government Polytechnic College, Westhill P.O, Kozhikode
- Government Polytechnic College, Nattakom P.O., Kottayam, 686013
- Central Polytechnic, Vattiyoorkavu P.O, Thiruvananthapuram, 695013
- Maharaja's Technological Institute, Chembukavu, Thrissur 680020
- AWH Polytechnic College, Kuttikkattoor, Kozhikode
- Carmel Polytechnic, Punnapra P.O., Alappuzha, 688004
- Government Polytechnic, Angadippuram, Perinthalmanna, 679321
- Government Polytechnic, Attingal, 695101
- Government Polytechnic, Ezhukone, Kollam
- Government Polytechnic, Kalamassery, 683104
- Government Polytechnic, Koovappady P.O., Perumbavoor, Ernakulam
- Government Polytechnic, Koratty
- Government Polytechnic, Kotambu P.O., Palakkad, 678551
- Government Polytechnic, Kothamangalam, Chelad P.O., 686681, Ernakulam
- Government Polytechnic, Kumily
- Government Polytechnic, Kunnamkulam, Kizhoor P.O., Trichur, 680523
- Government Polytechnic College, Karuvambram P.O, Manjeri, Kerala 676517
- Government Polytechnic, Manakala P.O., Adoor, Pathanamthitta, 691523
- Government Polytechnic, Marothrvattom P.O., Cherthala, Alappuzha, 688545
- Government Polytechnic, Mattannur, Kannur, 670 702
- Government Polytechnic, Meppadi, Wayanad, 673577
- Government Polytechnic, Meenangadi, Wayanad, 673591
- Government Polytechnic, Muttom P.O., Thodupuzha, Idukkim, 685587
- Government Polytechnic, Nedumangad
- Government Polytechnic, Nedumkandam
- Government Polytechnic, P.O. Periye, Kasaragod, 671316
- Government Polytechnic College, Pala, Kottayam Dist., 686575
- Government Polytechnic, Punalur
- Government Polytechnic, Perumpazhuthoor, Thiruvananthapuram
- Government Polytechnic, Purappuzha P.O., Thodupuzha, Idukki, 685583
- Government Polytechnic, Thottada
- Government Polytechnic, Thrikaripur
- Government Polytechnic, Vennikulam, Pathanamthitta, 589544
- Government Polytechnic College, Chelakkara, Thrissur
- Government Polytechnic College, Thirurangadi, Velimukku P.O., Malappuram, 676317
- Government Women's Polytechnic, Kaimonom, Thiruvananthapuram
- Orphanage Polytechnic College, Edavanna
- Institute of Printing Technology & Government Polytechnic College, Kulappully, Shoranur, 679122, Palakkad
- J.D.T Islam Polytechnic, P.B. No. 1702, Marikkunnu, Kozhikode, 673012
- KELTRON TOOLROOM RESEARCH AND TRAINING CENTRE, Keltron complex, Keltron road, Aroor, Alappuzha-688534
- KMCT Polytechnic College, Kalananthode Chanthamangalam, Kozhikode
- Ma'din Polytechnic College, Melmuri, Malappuram
- Model Polytechnic, Kallettumkara P.O., Thrissur, 680683
- Model Polytechnic, Mattakkara, P.O Kottayam, 686564
- Model Polytechnic, Nut Street, Vatakara, 673104, Kozhikode
- Model Polytechnic, Painavu, Idukki District
- N.S.S. Polytechnic, Mannamnagar P.O., Pandalam, 689501
- Residential Women's Polytechnic, Payyanur, Kannur, 670307
- S.N.Polytechnic, Kanhangad, Kasaragod, 671315
- Seethi Sahib Memorial Polytechnic, P.B. No.1, P.O Thekkummuri, Tirur, 676105
- S.N.Polytechnic, Kottiyam, Kollam, 691 571
- Sree Rama Polytechnic, Valapad, Thrissur, 680567
- St. Mary's Polytechnic College, Valliyode, Palakkad
- Thiagarajar Polytechnic College, Alagappanagar P.O., 680302, Thrissur
- Women's Polytechnic, Ernakulam, Kalamassery P.O.
- Women's Polytechnic, Kayamkulam
- Women's Polytechnic, Kottakkal, P.O. Valavannur, Malappuram
- Women's Polytechnic, Kozhikode, 673009
- Women's Polytechnic, Nedupuzha P.O., Thrissur, 680015

== See also ==
- Bureau of Technical Education
- Department of Technical Education, Kerala
- List of institutions of higher education in Kerala
