= Jancy James =

Vice Chancellor of Central University of Kerala

Prof. Dr. Jancy James
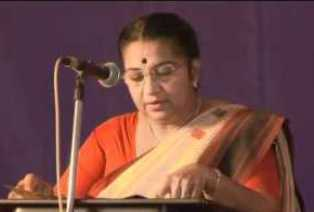

Vice-Chancellor of the Central University of Kerala
- Incumbent
- Assumed office March 2009

Personal details
- Born: 1950 (age 75–76)

Jancy James was the first Vice Chancellor of Central University of Kerala situated near Kasaragod in the Kerala State of India. She was born in Vaikam and was also a member of UPSC civil service interview board.

Earlier she was the Vice Chancellor of Mahatma Gandhi University in Kerala. She was also the first woman to become the Vice Chancellor of a university in Kerala when she was appointed to Mahatma Gandhi University.
