= Rajagiri College of Social Sciences =

College in Kerala, India

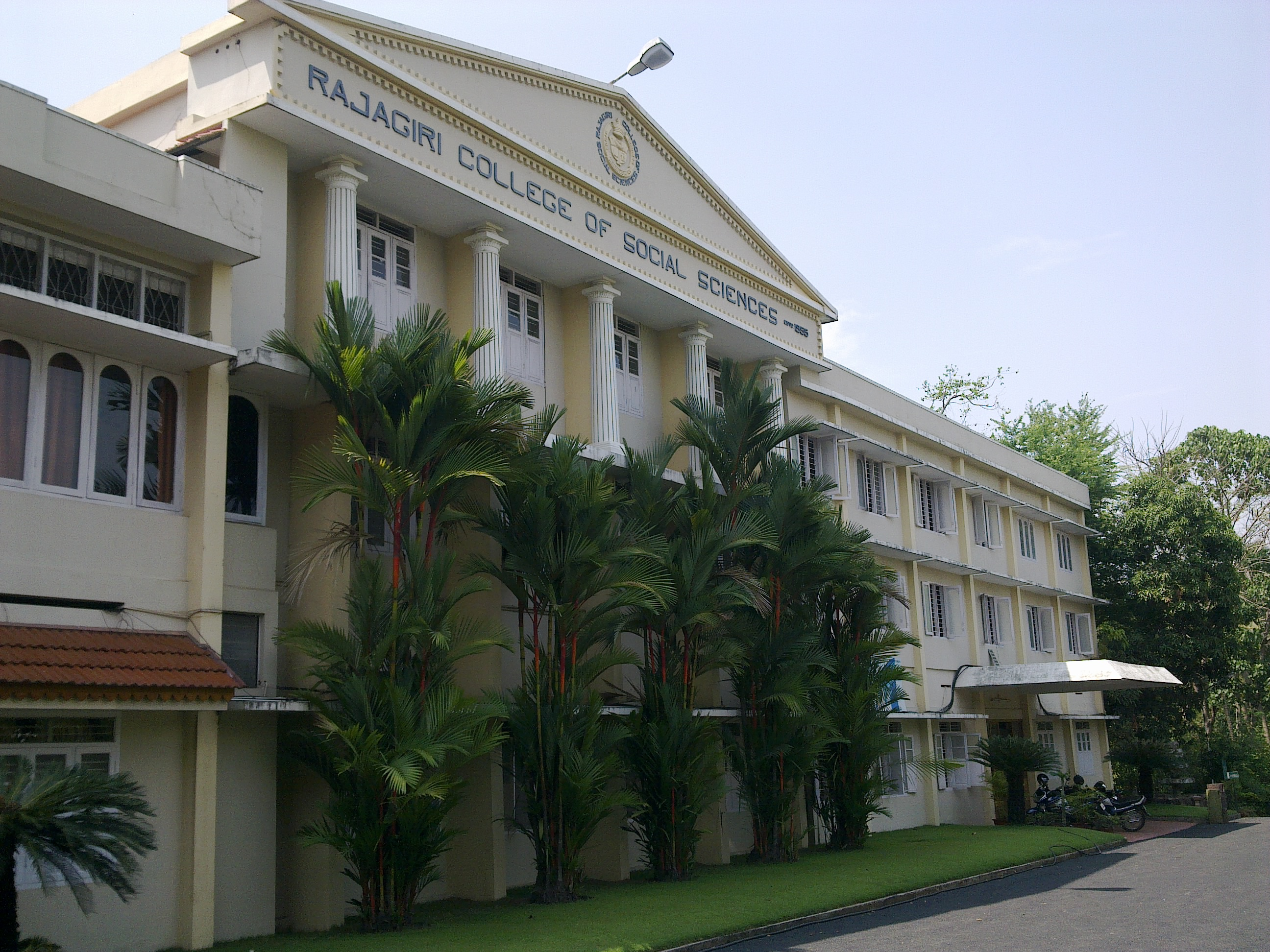
- Other name: Rajagiri Vidyapeetham
- Motto: Learn Serve Excel
- Type: Autonomous
- Established: 1955
- Parent institution: Rajagiri
- Location: Kalamassery, Kochi, Kerala, India; 10.0525°N 76.3148°E
- Website: rcss.rajagiri.edu

Rajagiri College of Social Sciences is an autonomous higher education institution located in Kalamassery, Kochi, in the Indian state of Kerala. It is managed by the Carmelites of Mary Immaculate (CMI) congregation and is affiliated with the Mahatma Gandhi University.

== History ==
The college was established in 1955 under the auspices of the University of Madras. In 1960, it received accreditation to offer degrees in Social Work under the University of Kerala and later relocated to its current campus in Kalamassery, Kochi. Over the years, the institution has grown to include various undergraduate, postgraduate, and doctoral programmes in arts, sciences, and professional disciplines.

== Academics ==
Rajagiri College of Social Sciences offers a range of academic programmes including:

- Bachelor of Social Work (BSW)
- Bachelor of Commerce (BCom)
- Bachelor of Business Administration (BBA)
- Bachelor of Science in Psychology (BSc Psychology)
- Bachelor of Library and Information Science (BLISc)
- Master of Social Work (MSW)
- Master of Library and Information Science (MLISc)
- Master of Computer Applications (MCA)
- Master of Science in Statistics with Data Science (Msc Statistics with Data Science)
- Research degrees (MPhil and PhD)

Additionally, the college offers short-term diploma and certificate programmes across various disciplines.

== Rajagiri Centre for Business Studies (RCBS) ==
Rajagiri Centre for Business Studies (RCBS) is the business school under the Rajagiri Vidyapeetham umbrella. It offers postgraduate programmes in management including:

- Master of Business Administration (MBA)
- Post Graduate Diploma in Management (PGDM)
- Master of Human Resource Management (MHRM)
- International Exchange MBA Programme

RCBS has been featured in various national rankings, including the top 100 business schools in India by the National Institutional Ranking Framework (NIRF) and Outlook magazine.

RCBS conducts several events throughout the academic year, including:

- Inflore – Annual Management Fest
- Rajagiri National Business Quiz (RNBQ)
- Rajagiri Business League (RBL) – An inter-corporate basketball tournament
- Rajagiri Transcend – A social outreach programme for underprivileged children

== Rankings ==
College rankings

General – India
- NIRF (Colleges) (2024): 20

Rajagiri College of Social Sciences was ranked 20th among colleges in India by the National Institutional Ranking Framework (NIRF) in 2024.

== Notable alumni ==
- V. D. Satheesan – 13^{th} Chief Minister of Kerala (2026 - Incumbent)
- RJ Renu – Radio jockey and actress
- Vijayarajamallika – Poet
