= Muthuvara =

Village in Kerala, India

- village
- Location in Kerala, India Muthuvara (India)
- Coordinates: 10.55137°N 76.174088°E
- Country: India
- State: Kerala
- District: Thrissur

Government
  - Body: Adat Grama Panchayath

Languages
  - Official: Malayalam, English
- Time zone: UTC+5:30 (IST)
- PIN: 680553
- Vehicle registration: KL-08
- Nearest city: Thrissur
- Lok Sabha constituency: Alathur

Muthuvara is a village in the Thrissur district of Kerala, India.
