= National University of Advanced Legal Studies =

Law school in Kochi, India

- Former name: National Institute of Advanced Legal Studies (NIALS)
- Type: National Law University, State university
- Established: 2002; 24 years ago (as NIALS); 2005; 21 years ago (as NUALS)
- Affiliations: UGC, BCI
- Chancellor: Chief Justice of High Court of Kerala
- Vice-Chancellor: Dr. G. B. Reddy
- Visitor: Justice K. Vinod Chandran
- Students: 500
- Location: Kochi, Kerala, India
- Campus: 10 acres (4.0 ha); Urban
- Founding document: The National University of Advanced Legal Studies Act, 2005
- Website: www.nuals.ac.in

The National University of Advanced Legal Studies, commonly referred to as NUALS, is a public law school located in Kochi, India. Established by an Act of the Kerala Legislative Assembly in 2005, NUALS is one of the oldest National Law Universities in the country. The university is hosted in a 10-acre campus in the KINFRA Hi-Tech Park at Kalamassery near the Naval Armament Depositary of the Indian Navy.

The university offers a five-year undergraduate Bachelor of Arts—Bachelor of Laws programme (BA, LLB), a postgraduate Master of Laws (LLM) in Constitutional Law, Public Health Law and International Trade Law, and also provides post graduate diplomas in various laws. The university also offers an Executive LL.M. degree for working professionals spanning three years. Admissions to the University are done through the Common Law Admission Test (CLAT). Additionally, the university also offers doctoral degrees in law.

== History ==
The university began its roots as the National Institute of Advanced Legal Studies, established by the Bar Council of Kerala Trust, with affiliation from the Cochin University of Science and Technology in 2002. Later on, upon request of the Bar Council of Kerala, the Kerala Legislative Assembly enacted the National University of Advanced Legal Studies Act in 2005 which established the current university, and inter alia merged the Institute with the university. Dr. S. G. Bhat was the founding Vice-Chancellor of the University.

Classes began in the University in 2005, and lectures were delivered in the campus of the Government Girls’ High School, Kaloor. The university was dedicated to the nation by K. G. Balakrishnan, the then-Chief Justice of India. The university received its permanent campus at Kalamassery on 2011.

NUALS was the first among the National Law Universities to adopt the UGC Jeevan Kaushal programme, which imbibes skill development alongside learning. A unique Skill-based Learning programme was initiated which teaches communication, management and leadership skills.

== Administration ==
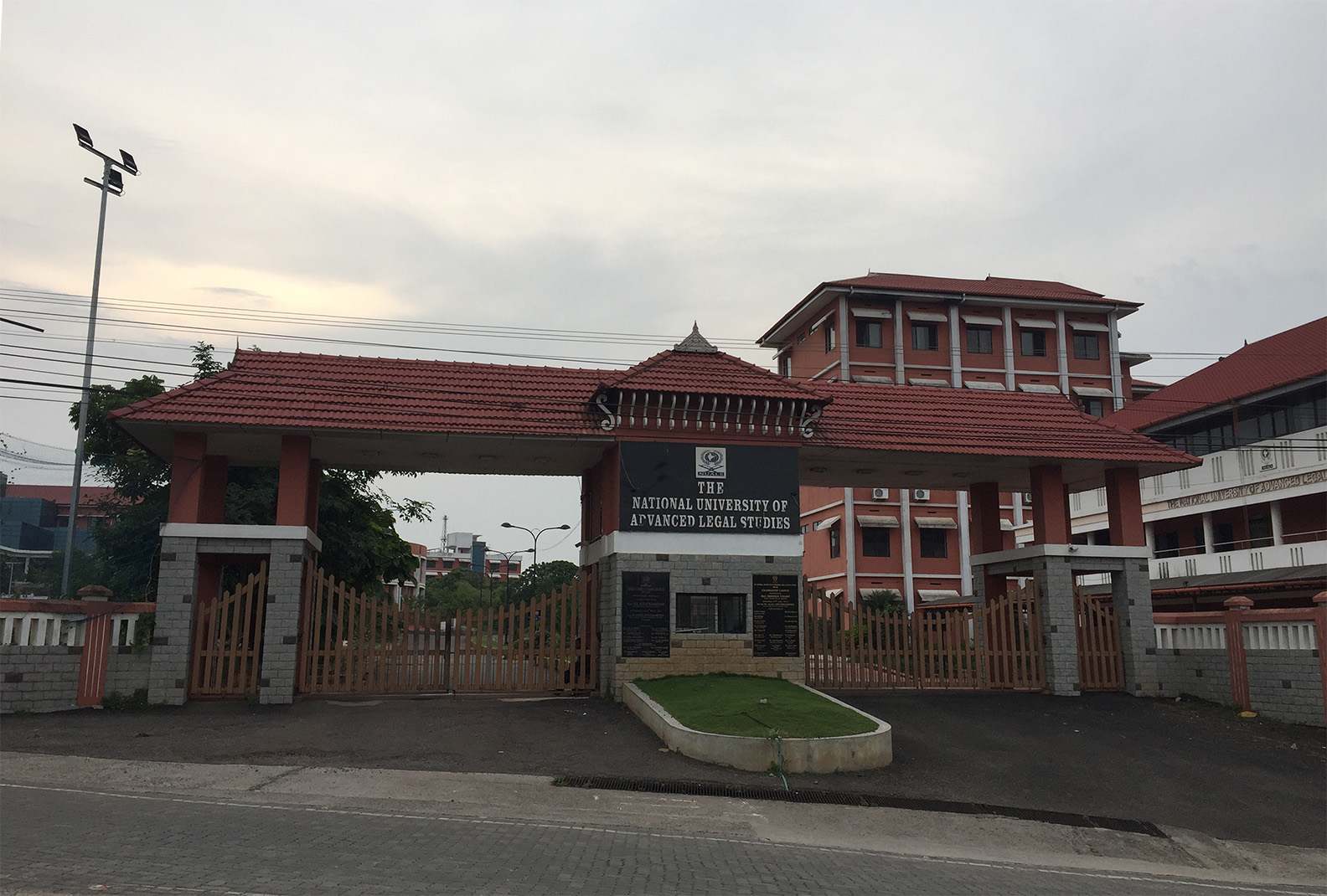
Entrance to the campus.

The Chief Justice of the High Court of Kerala serves as the Chancellor of the university, with the Chief Justice of India or their appointed nominee serving as the Visitor. The vice-chancellor is the chief executive of the university, and the Registrar is the administrative officer. The Vice-Chancellor and Registrar serve for a term of four years. Currently, Prof. (Dr.) G. B. Reddy serves as the Vice-Chancellor, who took over in 2025. The Minister of Higher Education in Kerala serves as the Pro-Chancellor of the University.

The university has three plenary governing councils, namely the Executive, General and Academic Councils. Their members include the Advocate-General of Kerala, Trustees of the Bar Council of Kerala Trust, and various esteemed advocates and legislative members. The Executive Council is the governing authority of the University, chaired by the Vice-Chancellor. The General Council is the plenary authority and decides on budgets and amendments to the statutes, and the Academic Council decides on the syllabus and academic affairs.

== Academics ==
The university offers the Bachelors of Arts and Laws (BA, LLB), and the Master of Laws (LL.M.) in Constitutional Law, International Trade Law, and Public Health Law. Admissions are made to these programmes through the Common Law Admission Test (CLAT), conducted by the Consortium of National Law Universities.

The university also gives doctoral degrees, and provides postgraduate diplomas in Cyber Law, Banking Law, Insurance Law, Medical Law and Ethics and Education Law. An Executive LL.M. programme was initiated for working legal professionals and advocates.

=== Undergraduate ===
The University offers an integrated B.A., LL.B. as a five-year programme, which is the standard undergraduate degree in law in India, and serves as the university’s flagship course. Students learn courses in political science, economics, history, and sociology, alongside law subjects such as crimes and tort in the first two years, after which they study mainly legal subjects for the other three years.

The university has a skill-based learning programme for the first two years, where students are taught on professional skills such as communication, management, leadership, and human values to improve and build confidence upon their abilities. Various legal studies exercises have also been implemented as part of a process to gamify the study of law, in consultation with the School of Management Studies, CUSAT. Each student is also allotted to a mentor, who assists the student throughout their programme. At the end of their programme, students undergo the Finishing School, which prepares students for their professional career.

=== Postgraduate ===
NUALS offers a one-year Master of Laws, a three-year Executive LL.M., and various postgraduate diplomas. The one-year LLM programme offers majors in Constitutional Law, International Trade Law, and Public Health Law. The Executive LLM is a similar programme intended for working law professionals, advocates and judicial officers, and classes are usually held during the vacation period of the Kerala High Court and other holidays. Various postgraduate diplomas are also taught in Cyber Law, Banking Law, Insurance Law and Education Law.

=== Dr. N. Narayanan Nair Memorial Library ===
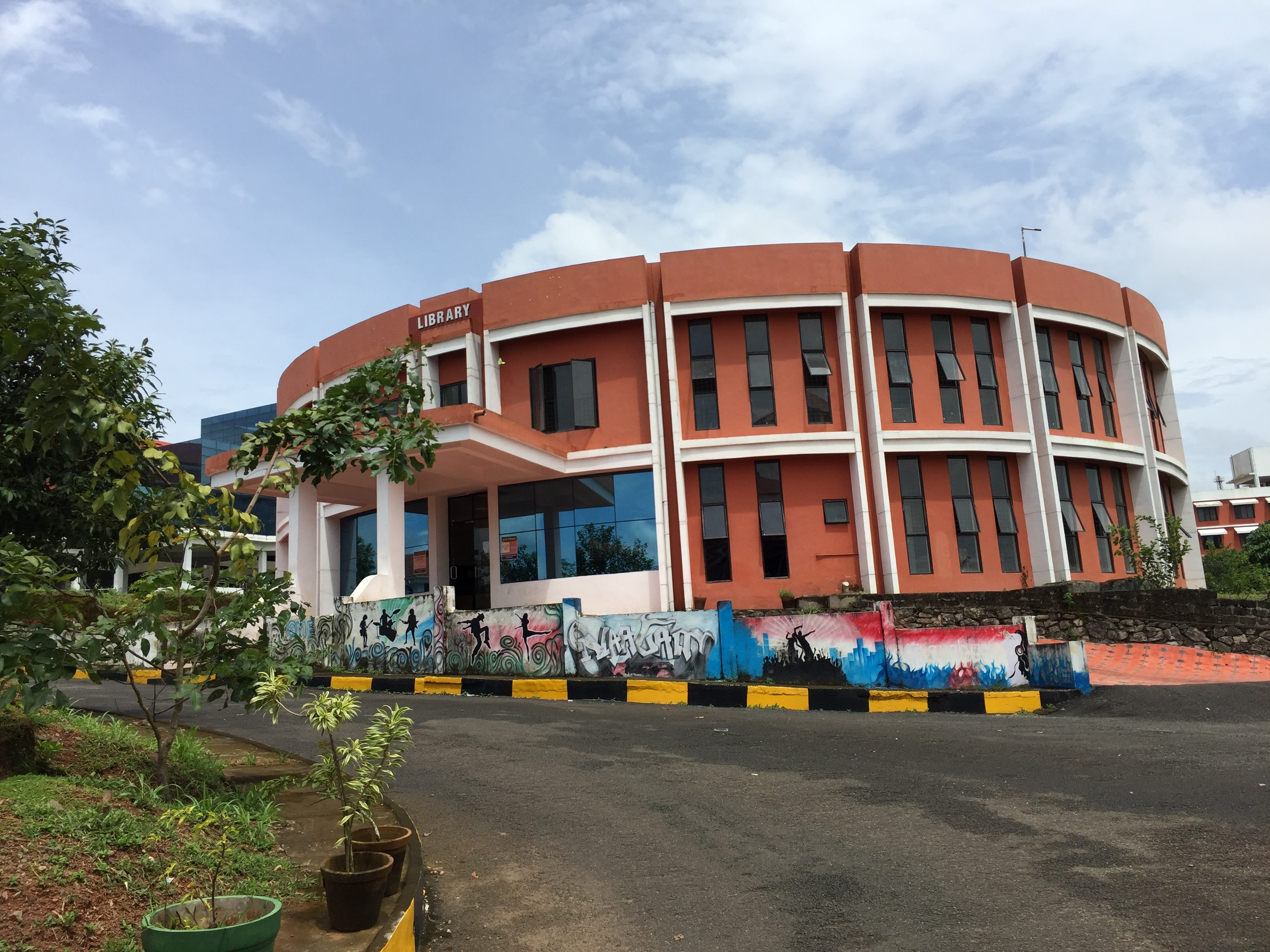
The library complex.

The Dr. N. Narayanan Nair Memorial Library for Advanced Legal Studies and Research houses over 18000 books, and is home to the original library collections of A. G. Noorani, V. R. Krishna Iyer, Sr. Adv. T. P. Kelu Nambiar, Dr. P. Leelakrishnan, among others. It is named after N. Narayanan Nair, former vice-chancellor and the founding director of the Kerala Law Academy.

== Student life ==
=== The Students’ Council ===
The Students’ Council is the official student body that is responsible for conducting activities and events, as well as to represent the interests of the students. All students are members of the council, and five members are elected from each batch to form its executive committee. Events such as Altus Disputatio debating competition, the NUALS Arts and Literary Annual Meet (NAALAM), the NUALS Parliamentary Debate, the NUALSMUN, Aaroha quiz competition are held through the Students’ Council. The Council also publishes the NUALS Law Journal and the NUALS Magazine.

=== Mooting ===
NUALS is the second law school in Asia and the only university in South Asia to win the Nelson Mandela World Human Rights Moot, in 2023. The university has also won the Stetson International Environmental Law Moot in 2020, and were semifinalists in 2019. They were finalists in the Ian Fletcher Insolvency Moot in 2024, and semi-finalists in the Herbert Smith Freehills-King's College London Competition Law Moot 2024. NUALS has also achieved accolades in the Philip C. Jessup International Law Moot Court Competition, having won the first place Richard R. Baxter Award for Best Applicant Memorial and the Cherif M. Bassiouni Award in 2026. Students of the university have also garnered various accolades throughout their international mooting.

The NUALS Moot Court Society (MCS), which handles all mooting activities, organises The NUALS Moot, a national-level competition based on international taxation law. The MCS also organises the M. K. Nambyar Memorial NUALS International Maritime Law Arbitration Competition (NIMLAC), an international arbitration competition held since 2014.

The MCS also organises the Internal Moot Court Competition which screens students for moot participation, and holds challenger rounds for major international moots.

=== Debating ===
NUALS students have achieved remarkable success across many national debates, such as in the NLS Debate, NALSAR IV, IIT Kharagpur PD, and more.

The NUALS Debating Society, an organisation under the Students’ Council, organises the annual NUALS Parliamentary Debate, which is a major debating competition in the Indian circuit, and follows the British Parliamentary style of debate. They also organise Altus Disputatio, a unique debating championship which follows a unique debating format called "the Devil’s Cross", emphasizing on quick thinking and improvisation.

The MUN Society promotes UN-style debates, and organises the NUALS MUN, one of the largest MUN conferences in South India.

=== Quizzing ===
The university has a quiz club, which organises various quiz competitions with various societies. Aaroha is the flagship national-level quiz competition hosted by the University, garnering quizzers from across the country.

=== Alternative Dispute Resolution ===
The Alternative Dispute Resolution Society (ADRSoc) is a student organisation which handles all ADR-related activities in the University. The ADRSoc conducts the NUALS National Mediation Competition, a national-level mediation competition. The ADRSoc also organises the International ADR Seminar annually.

NUALS had won the Best Negotiation Plan award in the HSF Kramer-NLU Delhi International Negotiation Competition 2025.

== Publications ==
NUALS publishes a plethora of journals, newsletters and blogs, with the NUALS Law Journal being the flagship, student-edited journal of the university, published since 2005. The NUALS Law Journal is one of the most prominent student-edited journals according to data from Google Scholar, with a rating of 3.1, and is ranked 17th according to the Indian Law Journal Ranking System.

The various journals published under the university are:

- The NUALS Law Journal (NLJ)
- The NUALS Intellectual Property Law Review (IPLR)
- The Securities Law Review (SLR)
- The Constitutional Studies Review (CSR)
- The Restructuring and Insolvency Law Journal (RILJ)

Various centres such as the Centre for Competition Law and Policy and the Centre for Law and Environment also manage blogs and newsletters.
