= Mahatma Gandhi University, Kerala =

State-run university in Kerala

Coordinates: 9°39′35.7″N 76°31′49.6″E

Mahatma Gandhi University
- Emblem of Mahatma Gandhi University
- Other name: MGU
- Motto: Vidyayā Amṛtamaśnute (Sanskrit)
- Motto in English: Knowledge makes one immortal
- Type: Public State University
- Established: October 2, 1983; 42 years ago
- Accreditation: NAAC, NBA, NIRF
- Affiliations: UGC, AIU, ACU
- Chancellor: Governor of Kerala
- Vice-Chancellor: Mavoothu Duraipandi (interim)
- Students: 1,28,000+
- Location: Kottayam, Kerala, India
- Campus: Suburb
- Website: mgu.ac.in

The Mahatma Gandhi University, Kerala (MGU) is a state owned public university headquartered in Kottayam in the state of Kerala, India. It was established on 2 October 1983 on Gandhi Jayanti day.

Mahatma Gandhi University (formerly Gandhiji University) has been approved by University Grants Commission (UGC) and accredited with the highest grade of 'A++' (CGPA - 3.61) by the National Assessment and Accreditation Council of India. The university has 31 departments of teaching and research and around 260 affiliated colleges spread over five districts in central Kerala.

In March 2025, Mahatma Gandhi University has been awarded the prestigious Category 1 Grade Autonomy by the University Grants Commission (UGC). This recognition granted MGU extensive autonomy to launch new initiatives and establish institutions without prior UGC approval, making it the first university in the state to achieve this distinction.

== Academics ==
The University offers a diverse array of programs at the Undergraduate, Postgraduate, and Doctoral levels through its 31 University Departments, 1 International and Inter-University Centre, 7 Inter-University Centres, 9 Inter School Centres, 1 National Centre, 3 International Centres, 79 Government/Aided Affiliated Colleges including 14 Autonomous Colleges, 194 Unaided Affiliated Colleges, and 225 Recognised Research Centres. It provides education in both interdisciplinary and traditional fields such as Science, Social Science, and Humanities, as well as in professional areas including Management, Technology, Legal Studies and Pedagogy etc.

The University is well-known for its extensive range of specialisations available for various Undergraduate, Postgraduate, and Professional programs through its affiliated colleges. There are 50 specialisations for the Bachelor of Arts (B.A), 39 for the Bachelor of Science (B.Sc), 17 for the Bachelor of Commerce (B.Com), 33 for the Master of Arts (M.A), 51 for the Master of Science (M.Sc), and 5 for the Master of Commerce (M.Com) programs. Average annual student enrolment is around 40,000.

Currently, MGU provides research programs in forty different fields through both its research centres and its own schools. Additionally, it collaborates with internationally renowned research institutions, including the Max Plank Institute of Technology in Germany, Brown University in the United States, California Institute of Technology in the United States, the University of Toronto in Canada, Catholic University in Belgium, the Institute of Political Studies in France, the University of Paris, and Swinburne University in Australia. Collaboration extends to student and faculty exchange, joint research projects, and shared facilities.

At the national level, MGU works with agencies like UGC, DST, CSIR and others on funded research. The Erudite Scholar in Residence Program was also started to give students the chance to have a deeper understanding of their field of study. Several Nobel Laureates are invited to engage directly with the students.

Notably, MGU is the only state university in Kerala to have obtained UGC approval for conducting online degree programmes. Currently, MGU offers online programmes such as MBA, M.A. in English, B.Com (Honours) and M.Com through its Centre for Distance and Online Education (CDOE).

== Rankings ==
University rankings

General – international
- Times (World) (2024): 401-500
- Times (Asia) (2024): 134

General – India
- NIRF (Overall) (2024): 67
- NIRF (Universities) (2024): 37

The National Institutional Ranking Framework (NIRF), 2024 ranked Mahatma Gandhi University 37th among top universities and 67th in the overall category in India.

The Times Higher Education (THE), London has ranked Mahatma Gandhi University amongst the top 500 universities in the World in THE World University Rankings 2025.

In the Times Higher Education Asia University Rankings 2025, Mahatma Gandhi University has been placed at the 4th position among all Indian Universities.

MGU was awarded the Chancellor's Prize for The Best University in Kerala thrice in 2016, 2018 & 2020 making it the first university in the state to achieve this feat.

In the Times Higher Education (THE) Young University Rankings 2024, Mahatma Gandhi University had topped the list of Indian universities, ranking 81st globally. The ranking lists the world's best universities that are 50 years old or younger.

In 2021, Mahatma Gandhi University was ranked third in Atal ranking by the Union Ministry of Education for innovation and entrepreneurship among Indian Universities.

== Administration ==
Prof. Mavoothu Duraipandi serves as the interim Vice-Chancellor of the University. The registrar is Prof. (Dr.) Binu Varghese and Dr. Sreejith C. M. holds the charge of Controller of Examinations.

The university is funded by the University Grants Commission and the Government of Kerala. It is a member of the Association of Indian Universities and the Association of Commonwealth Universities. Association of Commonwealth Universities represents over 480 universities from Commonwealth countries.

== Location ==
The university campus is located in the Priyadarsini Hills, Athirampuzha 12 Km from Kottayam Railway Station and 4 Km from Ettumanoor. To reach the campus, take deviation from M.C. Road at Ettumanoor or Gandhi Nagar. The nearest airport is Cochin International Airport situated at Nedumbassery, Cochin which is about 79 Km away. Private buses to Ernakulam starting from the Nagampadom bus stand at the northern end of the railway platform at Kottayam passes through the university.

== Schools and Departments ==
1. School of Behavioural Science (SoBS)

2. School of Bio-Science (SBS)

3. School of Chemical Science (SCS)

4. School of Computer Sciences (SoCS)

5. School of Social Sciences (SSS)

6. School of Environmental Science (SES)

7. School of Gandhian Thought and Development Studies (SGTDS)

8. School of Indian Legal Thought (SILT)

9. School of International Relations & Politics (SIRP)

10. Department of Printing & Publishing

11. School of Letters (SOL)

12. School of Pedagogical Sciences (SPS)

13. School of Physical Education & Sports Science (SPESS)

14. School of Pure and Applied Physics (SPS)

15. School of Management & Business Studies (SMBS)

16. School of Distance & Online Education (CDOE)

17. Department of Lifelong Learning and Extension (DLLE)

18. School of Tourism Studies (STS)

19. School of Mathematics and Statistics (SMS)

20. School of Artificial Intelligence and Robotics

21. School of Nano-science and Nanotechnology

22. School of Energy Materials

23. School of Food Science And Technology

24. School of Data Analytics

25. School of Gender Studies

26. School of Polymer Science and Technology

27. Department of Geology

28. K. N. Raj School of Economics

29. Institute for Integrated Programmes and Research in Basic Sciences (IIRBS)

30. The Institute for Multidisciplinary Programmes in Social Sciences (IMPSS)

31. Directorate for Applied Short-term Programmes (DASP)

32. University Employment Information and Guidance Bureau

33. Civil Service Institute (CSI)

Inter-School /Inter-University /National /International Centres

1. Advanced Molecular Materials Research Centre (AMMRC)

2. National Institute of Plant Science Technology (NIPST)

3. Institute of Research in Learning Disability (IRLD)

4. University Centre for International Co-operation (UCIC)

5. Institute for Contemporary Chinese Studies (ICCS)

6. Centre for Yoga and Naturopathy (CYN)

7. Business Innovation and Incubation Centre (BIIC)

8. Sophisticated Analytical Instrument Facilities (SAIF)

9. Inter University Centre for Nanoscience and Nanotechnology (IIUCNN)

10. International Centre for Polar Studies (ICPS)

11. International Centre for Ultrafast Studies (ICUS)

12. Inter University Centre for Organic Farming and Sustainable Agriculture (IUCOFSA)

13. Advanced Centre of Environmental Studies and Sustainable Development (ACESSD)

14. Inter University Centre for Disability Studies (IUCDS)

15. Inter University Centre for Social Science Research and Extension (IUCSSRE)

16. The Inter University Instrumentation Centre (IUIC)

17. Inter University Centre for Biomedical Research and Super Speciality Hospital (IUCBR & SSH)

18. Inter University Centre for Studies in Science of Music (IUCSSM)

== Notable alumni ==
- Karunakaran Babu
- George Kurian
- P. K. Biju
- Linto Joseph
- Dr. Justice Kauser Edappagath
- Kurian Joseph
- Srikant Murali
- Surabhi Lakshmi
- Aprem Mooken
- Mammootty
- Nayanthara
- Asin
- B. Kemal Pasha
- Kandathil Sebastian
- K. M. Tharakan
- Stanley George
- Venu Rajamony
- Vijilesh Karayad
- Eldhose Kunnappilly
- V. D. Satheesan
- Dean Kuriakose

== See also ==
- Rajan Gurukkal
- Mahatma Gandhi University Library
- Mahatma Gandhi University Staff Cricket Club
