= Ivanios (disambiguation) =

== People ==
- Geevarghese Ivanios (Syro-Malankara), First Metropolitan Archbishop of the Syro-Malankara Catholic Church
- Geevarghese Ivanios (Malankara Orthodox), a Metropolitan of the Malankara Orthodox Syrian Church
- Thomas Ivanios, a Metropolitan of the Malankara Orthodox Syrian Church
- Ivanios Kuriakose, a Syriac Orthodox bishop
- Ivanios Mathews, a Syriac Orthodox bishop

== Institutions ==
- Mar Ivanios College, autonomous educational institution
