= Malankara Orthodox Diocese of Southwest America =

Coordinates: 29.5141°N 95.9688°W

Diocese of Southwest America

Orthodox
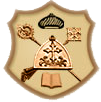
- Catholicate Emblem

Location
- Country: United States
- Territory: America
- Metropolitan: H. G. Thomas Mar Ivanios
- Headquarters: 3101 Hopkins Rd Beasley, TX 77417, USA

Information
- First holder: Alexios Mar Eusebios
- Rite: Malankara Rite
- Established: 1 April 2009
- Diocese: South West America Diocese
- Parent church: Malankara Orthodox Syrian Church

Website
- South West America Diocese

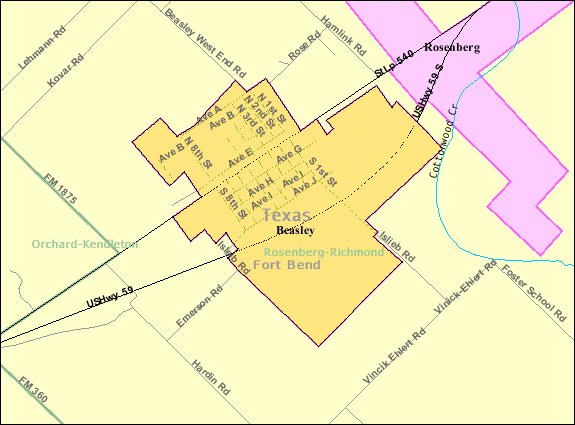
The Diocesan headquarter is located in Beasley, TX

The Malankara Orthodox Diocese of Southwest America, sometimes referred to as the Southwest Diocese or DS-WA is a diocese of the Malankara Orthodox Syrian Church. The diocesan headquarters are located in unincorporated Fort Bend County, Texas, with a postal address of Beasley, a suburban city in Texas 40 miles from downtown Houston. The southwest diocese covers several churches in the U.S. states, and Canada.

== History ==
=== American diocese ===
The American diocese was established in 1979 by Thomas Makarios. In 1991, after the transfer of Makarios to the newly formed Malankara Orthodox Diocese of UK, Europe & Africa, Mathews Barnabas was enthroned as metropolitan in 1993. In 2002, Zachariah Nicholovos was appointed as the assistant metropolitan.

=== Formation of the Southwest Diocese ===
The Diocese was formed by order number 145/2009 signed by the Catholicos of the Apostolic Throne of St. Thomas and Malankara Metropolitan, Didymus I on 1 April 2009. Barnabas and Nicholovos were appointed to the Northeast American Diocese and Alexios Eusebius was appointed the Southwest Diocese.

According to order number 01/2017, Eusebius was transferred to the Diocese of Mavelikkara. Subsequently the Malankara Metropolitan assumed control over the diocese and Zacharias Aprem was appointed as the assistant metropolitan to the diocese. In October 2022, Thomas Ivanios was appointed as the permanent Diocesan Metropolitan bringing an end to the temporary administrative set up that lasted for over five years.

=== Today ===
As of April 2020, there are 63 churches in the southwest diocese.

== Diocesan metropolitan ==
Assistant metropolitan

List of Diocesan Metropolitan
Name	Start	End	Notes
American Diocese Formed
Thomas Makarios	1979	1991	Founder and first Metropolitan of American Diocese
Mathews Barnabas	1993	2011	Enthroned as the Second metropolitan of the American Diocese. The American Diocese split into the Northeast American Diocese and Southwest American Diocese in 2009
Southwest Diocese Formed
Alexios Eusebius	2009	2017	First Metropolitan of the current Southwest American Diocese. Relinquished duties in 2017.
Zacharias Aprem	2017	2022	Assistant Metropolitan from 20 September 2017 - October 31, 2022
Thomas Ivanios	2022	Present	

== Parishes ==
1. St Thomas Malankara Orthodox Church, Seattle, WA
2. St. Gregorios Malankara Orthodox Church, Spokane, WA
3. St. Thomas Malankara Orthodox Church, Phoenix AZ
4. St. Gregorios Malankara Orthodox Church, San Francisco CA
5. St Mary’s Malankara Orthodox Church, Los Angeles CA
6. St. George Malankara Orthodox Church, Sacramento CA
7. St. Thomas Malankara Orthodox Valiyapally, Los Angeles CA
8. St Gregorios Malankara Orthodox Congregation Chapel San Diego
9. St Mary Malankara Orthodox Congregation Las Vegas
10. St Thomas Malankara Orthodox Church, Denver CO
11. St Mary’s Malankara Orthodox Valiyapally, Dallas TX
12. St Mary’s Malankara Orthodox Church, Carrollton, Dallas TX
13. St Thomas Malankara Orthodox Church, Dallas TX
14. St. George Malankara Orthodox Church, Dallas TX
15. St Gregorios Malankara Orthodox Church, Dallas TX
16. St Paul’s Malankara Orthodox Church, Dallas TX
17. St James Malankara Orthodox Church, Dallas TX
18. St Ephrem Malankara Orthodox Congregation North Dallas, TX
19. St. Thomas Malankara Orthodox Cathedral, Houston TX
20. St. Mary’s Malankara Orthodox Church, Houston TX
21. St Gregorios Malankara Orthodox Church, Houston TX
22. St. Peter's & St. Paul's Malankara Orthodox Church, Houston TX
23. St. Stephen's Malankara Orthodox Church, Houston TX
24. St John The Baptist Malankara Orthodox Congregation North Houston, TX
25. St. Gregorios Malankara Orthodox Church, Austin TX
26. St Gregorios Malankara Orthodox Congregation, McAllen TX
27. St. George Malankara Orthodox Church, San Antonio TX
28. St. Mary's Malankara Orthodox Church, San Antonio, TX
29. St. Thomas Malankara Orthodox Church, Lufkin TX
30. A&M College Station Orthodox Congregation, TX
31. St. Thomas Malankara Orthodox Church, Oklahoma City OK
32. St Gregorios Malankara Orthodox Congregation, New Orleans LA
33. St Thomas Malankara Orthodox Church, Pompano Beach, FL
34. St. Gregorios Malankara Orthodox Church, Miami FL
35. St. Thomas Malankara Orthodox Church, Miami FL
36. St. Gregorios Malankara Malankara Orthodox Church, Tampa FL
37. St. Mary's Malankara Orthodox Church, Tampa, FL
38. St. Mary’s Malankara Orthodox Church, Orlando FL
39. St. Paul's Malankara Orthodox Church, Orlando FL
40. St Gregorios Malankara Orthodox Church, Jacksonville FL
41. St. Mary’s Malankara Orthodox Congregation, South West Florida FL
42. St. Thomas Malankara Orthodox Church, Atlanta GA
43. St. Mary's Malankara Orthodox Church, Atlanta GA
44. St. Gregorios Malankara Orthodox Church, Atlanta GA
45. St Gregorios Malankara Orthodox Congregation, Augusta GA
46. St Thomas Malankara Orthodox Church Charlotte NC
47. St. Barnabas Malankara Orthodox Congregation, Nashville TN
48. St. Mary's Malankara Orthodox Congregation, Memphis TN
49. St Paul’s Malankara Orthodox Congregation, Chattanooga TN
50. St. George Malankara Orthodox Congregation, Louisville, KY
51. St Mary’s Malankara Orthodox Church, St. Louis MO
52. St Gregorios Malankara Orthodox Church, Kansas City MO
53. St Gregorios Malankara Orthodox Congregation, Minneapolis & St. Paul MN
54. St Gregorios Malankara Orthodox Cathedral, Bellwood IL
55. St. Gregorios Malankara Orthodox Church, Elmhurst IL
56. St. Thomas Malankara Orthodox Church, Chicago IL
57. St Mary’s Malankara Orthodox Church Oak Lawn. IL
58. St. Thomas Malankara Orthodox Church, Detroit MI
59. St. Gregorios Malankara Orthodox Church, Detroit MI
60. St. Mary’s Malankara Orthodox Church, Detroit MI
61. St. Gregorios Malankara Orthodox Church, Cleveland OH
62. St Ephrem Malankara Orthodox Congregation, Columbus OH
63. St Joseph The Just Malankara Orthodox Congregation, Dayton-Cincinnati OH
64. St. Antony The Abbot’s Malankara Orthodox Congregation, Pittsburg PA
65. Christ The Good Shepherd Malankara Orthodox Congregation, Houston TX
