= Joseph C Joseph Cor-Episcopa =

Priest

Very. Rev. Fr. Joseph C. Joseph Cor-Episcopa
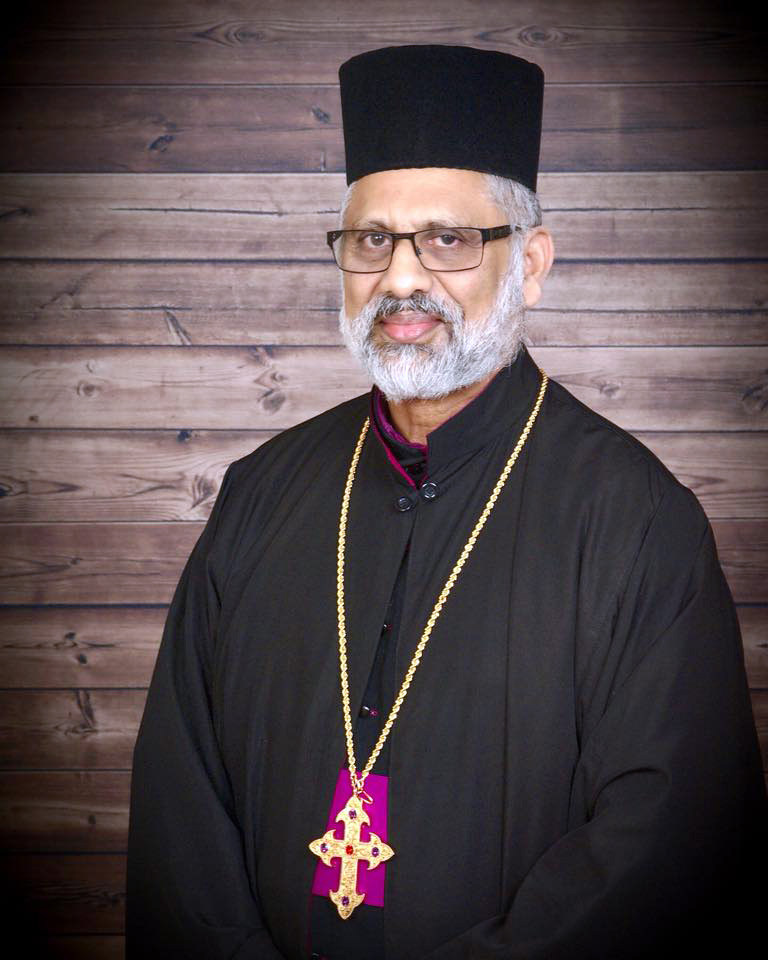
- Church: Jacobite Syrian Christian Church
- Archdiocese: Malankara Archdiocese of North America (Syriac Orthodox Church)
- See: Syriac Orthodox Patriarchate of Antioch

Orders
- Ordination: March 12, 1978 by Mor Athanasius Yesue Samuel
- Consecration: Mor Titus Yeldho by April 29, 2006
- Rank: Chorepiscopus

Personal details
- Born: January 13, 1952 Pathanamthitta
- Denomination: Orthodox Christian
- Residence: Smyrna, Georgia
- Parents: Paulose and Mariam Joseph
- Spouse: Mariamma Joseph
- Children: Janice, Joel, Jill

Joseph C. Joseph Corepiscopa is a priest of Jacobite Syrian Christian Church. He was born on January 13, 1952, as the son of the late Paulose and Mariamma Joseph, in Vazhamuttom of Pathanamthitta District of South India. He was baptized at St. Ignatius Monastery, Manjinikkara in India. Fr. Joseph migrated to the United States in 1976. He served as the Vicar of St. Ignatius Church, Dallas; St. Mary’s Church, Houston; St. Mary's Church, Winder, Georgia; and St. Mary's Church, Dallas. He was an Archdiocese Council Member (two terms), Vice President of the Association for Protection of Antiochean True Faith, Vice President of the Sunday School Association, Vice President of the St. Mary's Women's League, and currently is appointed as the Archdiocesan Clergy Secretary.
