= Angamaly Orthodox Diocese =

Angamaly Orthodox Diocese may refer to:

- Angamaly Malankara Orthodox Diocese, Kerala, India
- Angamaly Jacobite Orthodox Diocese, Kerala, India
