= Thiruvananthapuram Diocese =

Diocese of Thiruvananthapuram may refer to:

- Thiruvananthapuram Orthodox Diocese
- Roman Catholic Archdiocese of Trivandrum
- Syro-Malankara Catholic Major Archeparchy of Trivandrum
