= Calcutta Orthodox Diocese =

Diocese of Calcutta

Orthodox
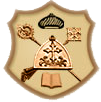
- Catholicate Emblem

Location
- Country: India
- Territory: Chhattisgarh, Madhya Pradesh and parts of - Arunachal Pradesh, Assam, Bihar, Maharashtra, Jharkhand, Manipur, Meghalaya, Mizoram, Nagaland, Odisha, Sikkim, Tripura, and West Bengal
- Metropolitan: H. G. Alexios Mar Eusebios
- Headquarters: St.Thomas Asram, Kailash Nagar, Near Industrial Estate, Bhilai, Durg Dist. Chhattisgarh-490 001

Information
- First holder: Stephanos Mar Theodosius
- Rite: Malankara Rite
- Established: 1975; 51 years ago
- Diocese: Calcutta Diocese
- Parent church: Malankara Orthodox Syrian Church

Website
- Calcutta Diocese

The Calcutta Diocese is one of the 32 dioceses of the Malankara Orthodox Syrian Church.

== History ==
This diocese was part of the Outside Kerala (Bahyakerala) diocese till 1975 . When the holy synod decided to divide the Outside Kerala Diocese, the diocese became a part of Madras Diocese. The present diocese of Calcutta came into existence in 1979. The Orthodox parishes in the North and North Eastern states of India, Kuwait in the Persian Gulf region are included in this diocese, viz. Chhattisgarh, Madhya Pradesh, parts of Maharashtra, West Bengal, Odisha, Bihar, Sikkim, Tripura, Jharkhand, Assam, Nagaland, Mizoram, Meghalaya, Arunachal Pradesh, and Manipur. The Diocesan headquarters is in St Thomas Ashram, Bhilai, Chhattisgarh. This was consecrated by the then Malankara Metropolitan Baselios Mar Thoma Mathews I, the Catholicos in 1986.

The first Metropolitan, Kayalath Dr. Stephanos Mar Theodosius was buried in St Thomas Ashram, Bhilai. He led the diocese into its glories. The diocese celebrated its silver jubilee in 2004. After Mar Theodosios's death in 2007, the diocese came directly under the control of the Malankara Metropolitan Baselios Marthoma Didymos 1. He appointed Puliyeeril Dr. Geevarghese Mar Coorilose, the Metropolitan of Bombay, as the assistant metropolitan of the diocese. In 2009, Dr. Joseph Mar Dionysius took charge as the Metropolitan of Calcutta.

Metropolitans

1)Kayaleth Dr.Stephanos Mar Theodosios (1979–2007)

2)Baselios Marthoma Didymos 1 (2007–2009)(As Malankara Metropolitan)

3)Dr. Joseph Mar Dionysios (2009–2022)

4) Alexios Mar Eusebios (2022–Present)

Assistant Metropolitans

1)Puliyeeril Dr. Geevarghese Mar Coorilose (2007–2009)

== Organization ==
The Diocesan Metropolitan is also the Director of St. Thomas Orthodox Church Mission, one of the pioneer missions outside Kerala. The Mission is mainly concerned with Education and Social Development.

The diocese manages 25 schools, one Arts and Science Post Graduate & B.Ed. College and an Engineering College(CCET-Bhilai). It has village mission projects in numerous villages.

Metropolitan of the diocese is Joseph Dionysius.

== Parish list ==
- Ahamadi St.Thomas Orthodox Church
- Bhandara St.Marys Orthodox Church
- Bilaspur Mar Gregorios Orthodox Church
- Bhopal St.Thomas Orthodox Cathedral
- Bokaro St.Marys Orthodox Church
- Bhubaneshwar St.George Orthodox Church
- Bhilai Mar Gregorios Orthodox Cathedral
- Calcutta St.Thomas Orthodox Cathedral
- Chandrapur Mar Gregorios Orthodox Church
- Cuttack St.George Orthodox Church
- Chirimiri St.George Orthodox Church
- Dimapur Mar Gregorios Orthodox Church
- Dhanpuri Mar Gregorios Orthodox Church
- Durgapur St.George Orthodox Church
- Hathital Mar Gregorios Orthodox Church
- Hoshangabad St.George Orthodox Church
- Guwahati Mar Gregorios Orthodox Church
- Harsi St.Johns Orthodox Church
- Hanagar St.George Orthodox Church
- Jabalpur St.George Orthodox Church
- Jagadalpur St.Thomas Orthodox Church
- Jamshedpur Mar Gregorios Orthodox Church
- Katini St.Marys Orthodox Church
- Kobra Mar Gregorios Orthodox Church
- Kuwait Mar Gregorios Orthodox Maha Edavaka
- Kuwait St.Basil Orthodox Church
- Kuwait St.Stephens Orthodox Church
- Kolar Mar Gregorios Orthodox Church
- Kondagaon St.Thomas Orthodox Church
- Nagpur St.George Orthodox Cathedral
- Patna Mar Gregorios Orthodox Church
- Raipur St.Marys Orthodox Church
- Rajhara St.Stephens Orthodox Church
- Rajanadagaon St.Marys Orthodox Church
- Ranchi St.Stephens Orthodox Church
- Raigarh Mar Gregorios Orthodox Church
- Rewa St.Thomas Orthodox Church
- Rourkela St.Pauls Orthodox Church
- Satna St.Gregorios Orthodox Church
- Sahdol Mar Gregorios Orthodox Church
- Saugor Mar Gregorios Orthodox Church
- Sarni St.Thomas Orthodox Church
- St Thomas Orthodox Mission Congregation
