= Yuhanon Mar Policarpos =

Oriental Orthodox bishop

His Grace Yuhanon Mar Policarpos
- Church: Malankara Orthodox Syrian Church
- Diocese: Angamaly Diocese
- In office: 2009 – present
- Predecessor: Mathews Barnabas

Orders
- Consecration: 19 February 2009 by Baselios Marthoma Didymos I

Personal details
- Born: 30 March 1955 (age 69); Vadakkanchery, Palakkad
- Parents: Mr. P V Zachariah, Ms. Annamma Zachariah

His Grace Yuhanon Mar Policarpos is a bishop of the Malankara Orthodox Syrian Church. He currently serves as the Diocesan Metropolitan of the Angamaly Diocese.

== Early life ==
Yuhanon Mar Policarpos (then P. S. Yohannan) family was born to P. V. Zachariah and Annamma Zachariah of Panniyankara Parakunnil family in Vadakkanchery, Palakkad on 30 March 1955. Policarpos did his schooling in Abhayakkad Chami Iyer High School, and graduated from Sree Narayana College, Alathur. Policarpos took his Masters degree in sociology from the University of Kerala. He has also received a diploma from Geneva in 1990.

Policarpos is a member of Thenidukku Church of the Kochi Diocese.

== Priesthood ==
He was ordained sub-deacon on 25 March 1977, deacon on 8 December and priest on 7 January 1980 and named Father P. S. Yohannan. He was later ordained as Ramban (monk) by His Holiness Moran Mar Baselios Marthoma Didymos I, the then Catholicos of the East and Malankara Metropolitan.

== Metropolitan ==
Yuhanon Ramban was elevated as bishop by Moran Mar Baselios Marthoma Didymos I, Catholicos of the East and Malankara Metropolitan at a consecration ceremony held at St. George Orthodox Church, Puthuppally on 19 February 2009. He was given the episcopal name His Grace Yuhanon Mar Policarpos and given the charge of the Angamaly Diocese.
