= Diocese of Calcutta =

Diocese of Calcutta may refer to:

- Roman Catholic Archdiocese of Calcutta
- Diocese of Calcutta of the Church of North India
- Kolkata Orthodox Diocese
