= Idukki Diocese =

Diocese of Idukki may refer to:

- Idukki Orthodox Diocese
- Syro-Malabar Catholic Diocese of Idukki
