= Kollam Orthodox Diocese =

Diocese of the Malankara Orthodox Syrian Church in India

Diocese of Kollam

Orthodox
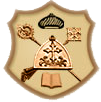
- Catholicate Emblem

Location
- Country: India
- Territory: Kollam
- Metropolitan: H. G. Dr. Joseph Mar Dionysius
- Headquarters: Bishop's House, Cross Jn., Kollam - 691 001

Information
- First holder: Dionysious V
- Rite: Malankara Rite
- Established: 1876, by Ignatius Peter IV
- Diocese: Kollam Diocese
- Parent church: Malankara Orthodox Syrian Church

Website
- Kollam Diocese

The Kollam Orthodox Diocese, one of the 32 dioceses of the Malankara Orthodox Syrian Church, was created after the Mulanthuruthy Synod in 1876. H.G. Dr. Joseph Mar Dionysius is the Metropolitan of the diocese, whose head office is in Bishop's House, Cross Junction, Kadappakada, Kollam, Kerala, India.

== History ==
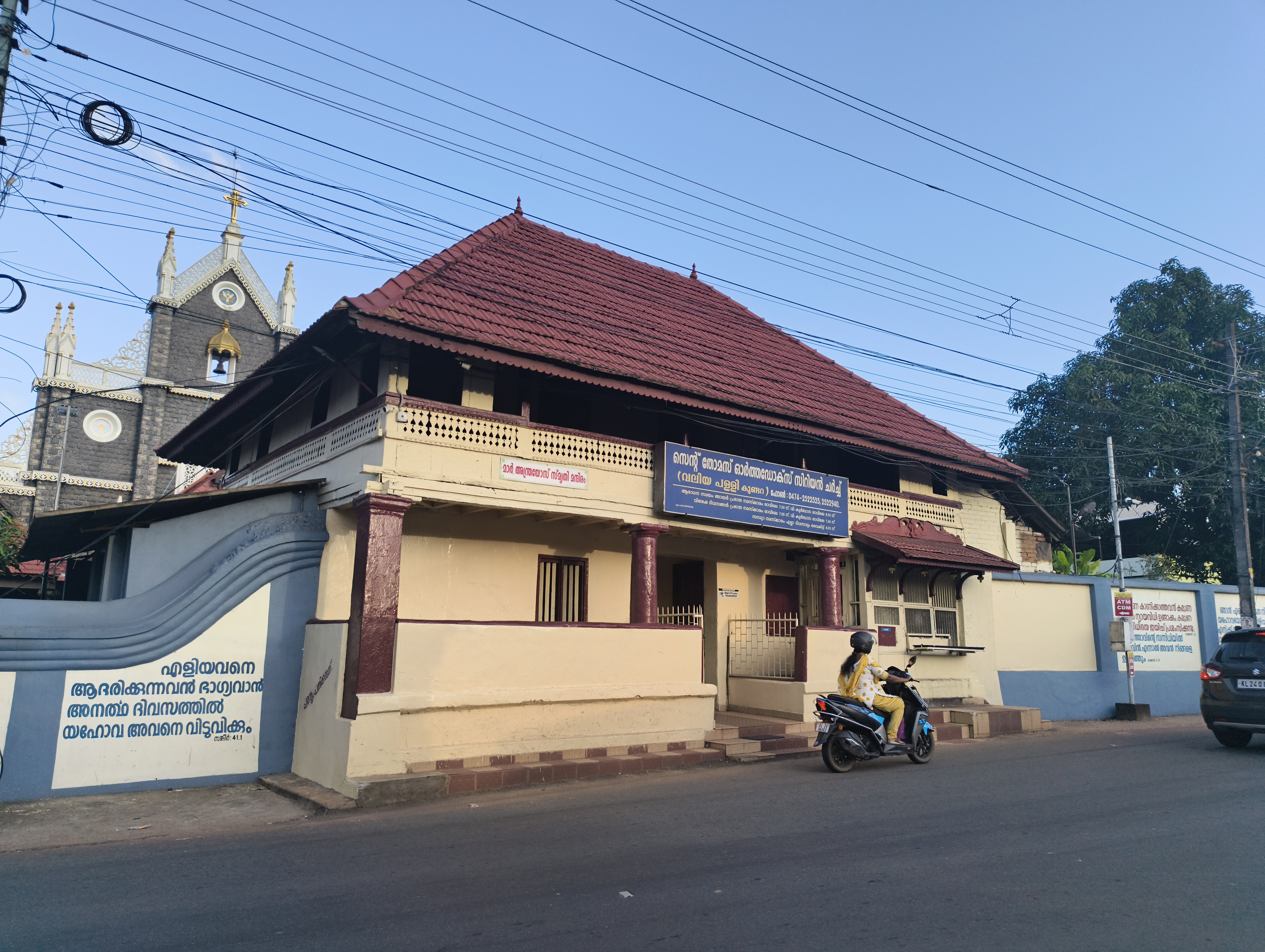
Old Building(Pallimeda) of St.Thomas Orthodox Syrian Church, Kundara

Kollam is an ancient commercial center and seaport. According to tradition, Thomas the Apostle arrived in the city and founded a church which is now underwater. Kollam is one of the seven dioceses created after the Mulanthuruthi Syrian Christian Association (synod) of 1876, led by Patriarch of Antioch Ignatius Peter IV; the other dioceses are Kottayam, Kandanadu, Angamali, Niranam, Thumpamon, and Kochi. Originally, there were over 30 churches in the diocese. Dionysious V was its first metropolitan bishop. He was succeeded by Geevarghese Gregorios of Parumala, who also led the Niranam diocese. Vattasserril Geevarghese, Geevarghese II (when the diocese's head office was in the Kundara seminary), Alexios Mar Thevodosios of Bethany (who became metropolitan in 1938), Mathews I, and Mathews II followed.

Mathews I moved the diocese's head office from Kottappuram Seminary in Kottarakkara to Cross Junction, near Kadappakada, where the bishop's house (aramana) and St. Thomas Orthodox Syrian Cathedral were built. Mathews II was appointed assistant metropolitan in 1985, and became metropolitan in 1991; the following year, there were 130 parishes and 13 churches. After his death, Didymos I became the diocese's eighth metropolitan. The Thiruvananthapuram Orthodox Diocese was created from the Kollam diocese in 1979, and the Adoor Kadampanad and Kottarakkara Punalur Orthodox Dioceses were created from the Thiruvananthapuram diocese in 2010.

== Diocesan Metropolitans ==
Kollam Orthodox Diocesan Metropolitan
From	Until	Metropolitan	Notes
1876	Unknown	Pulikkottil Joseph Mar Dionysious II also known as Dionysious V	1st Metropolitan of the diocese (Ruled as Malankara Metropolitan)
Unknown	1902	Chathuruthiyil Geevarghese Mar Gregorios	2nd Metropolitan of the diocese
1902	1909	Pulikkottil Joseph Mar Dionysious II also known as Dionysious V	Ruled Again as the Malankara Metropolitan
1909	1912	Geevarghese Mar Dionysius of Vattasseril	3rd Metropolitan of the diocese
1912	1934	Kallasseril Geevarghese Mar Gregorious and as Baselios Geevarghese II	4th Metropolitan of the diocese as mar Gregorios (1912-1929) as Catholicos (1929-1934)
1934	1941	Baselios Geevarghese II Catholicos	Ruled as Malankara Metropolitan
1941	1965	Mattackal Alexios Mar Theodosios	5th Metropolitan of the diocese
1966	1991	Mathews Mar Coorilos (Later Baselios Marthoma Mathews II)	6th Metropolitan of the diocese
1991	2009	Mathews Mar Epiphanios	7th Metropolitan of the diocese
2009	14-Oct-2022	Zachariah Mar Anthonios	8th Metropolitan of the diocese
03-Nov-2022	Present	Joseph Mar Dionysius	9th Metropolitan of the diocese

Assistant Metropolitan
From	Until	Metropolitan	Notes
1938	1941	Alexios Mar Theodosios	Assistant Metropolitan
1953	1966	Mathews Mar Coorilos	Assistant Metropolitan
1985	1991	Mathews Mar Epiphanios	Assistant metropolitan
1991	2009	Zachariah Mar Anthonios	Assistant Metropolitan

== Major churches ==
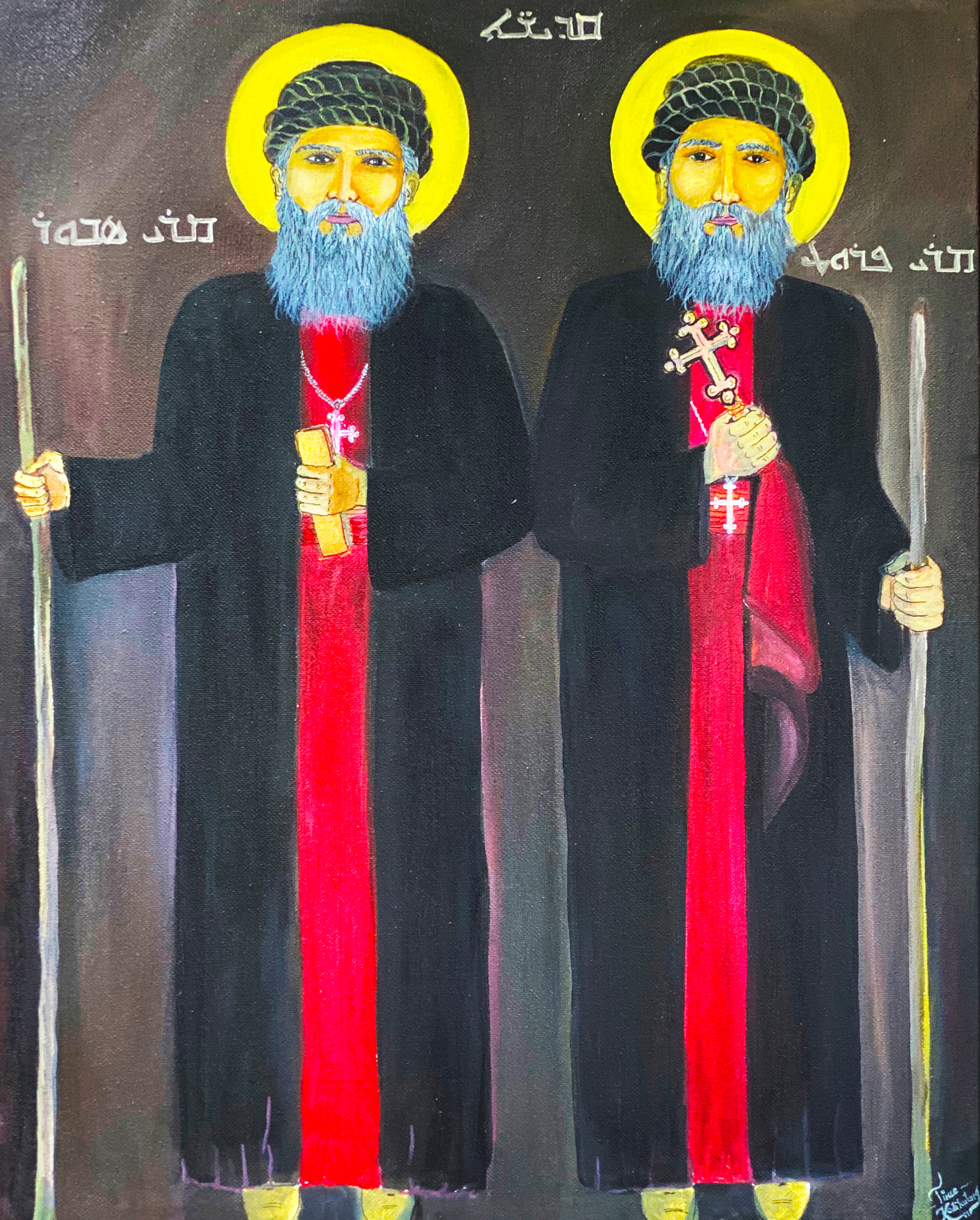
Mar Sabor and Mar Proth. According to tradition, they arrived in Kollam in 823.

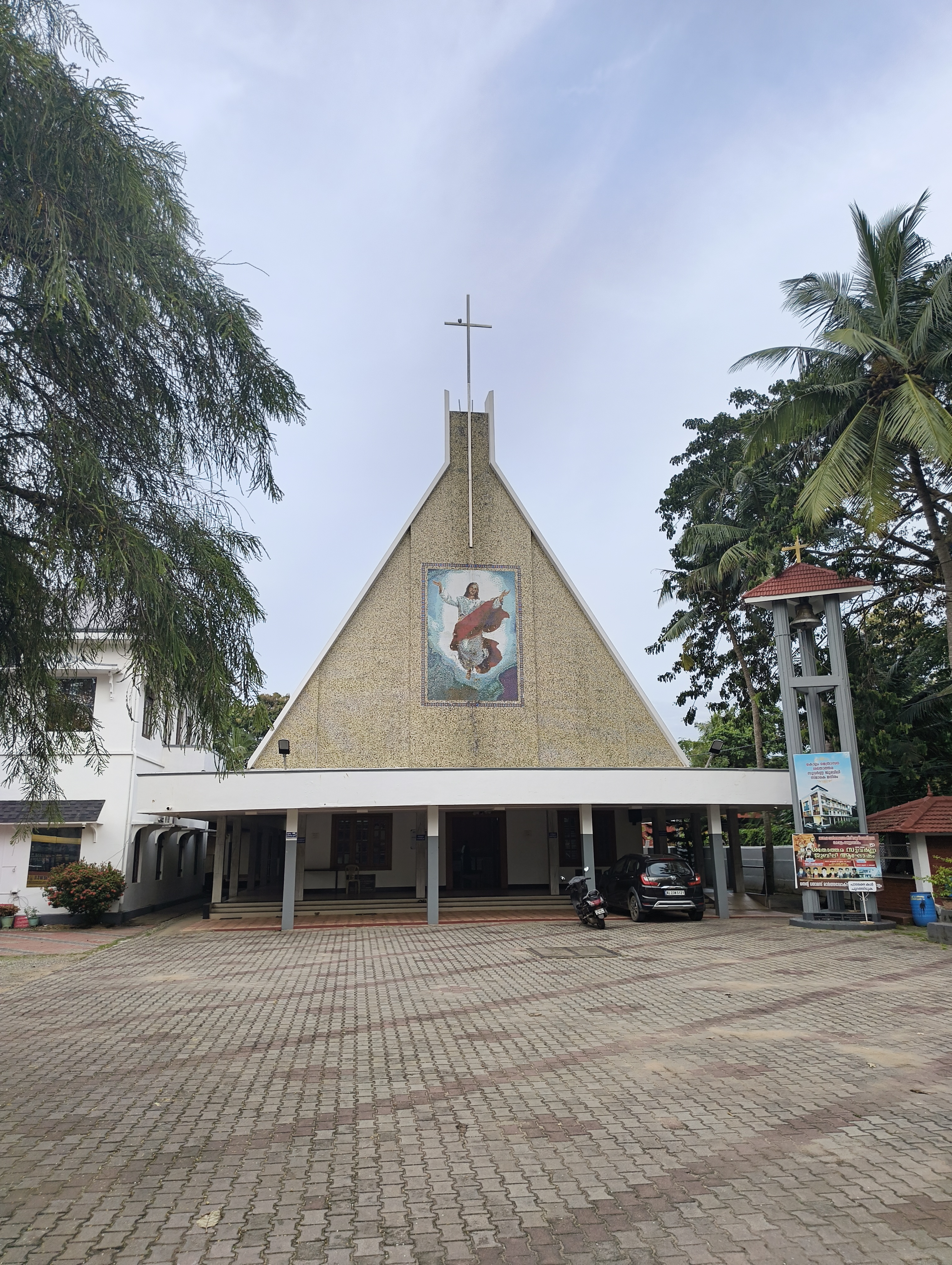
St. Thomas Orthodox Syrian Cathedral, Kollam (Bishop House)

The diocese has 64 parishes. The Kadeesha Syrian Church in Port Kollam, the tomb of Mar Abo in Thevalakkara, St. Mary's Orthodox Syrian Church in West Kallada, and St. Thomas Orthodox Syrian Church (Kundara Valiyapally) in Kundara are its oldest religious buildings. Kundara Seminary, the Nedumpaikulam St. George Orthodox Syrian Church, and the Nallila Bethel St. George Orthodox Syrian Church are other churches.

Two of the churches under this dicoese are currently locked down due to half a century old legal scuffles with Patriarch Faction. One is St. Thomas Orthodox Puthenpally, Kundara and St. Stephen's Orthodox Church, Mukhathala.

== Parishes ==
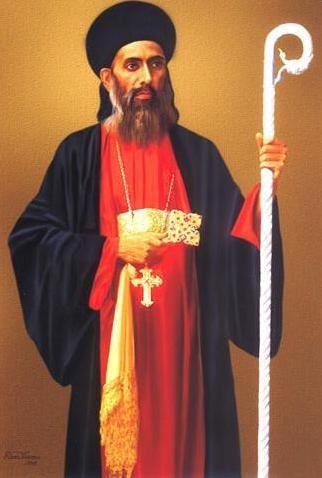
Chathuruthiyil Geevarghese Mar Gregorios of Parumala

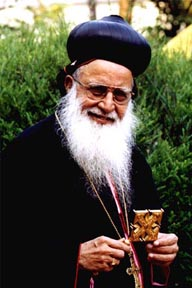
Mathews II

- Ananthamon Sehion St. George Orthodox Church
- Ambalanirap St. George Orthodox Church
- Chowallor St. George Orthodox Church
- St. Mary's Orthodox Church, Chittumala
- Edavattom St. George Orthodox Church
- Edakulangara Mar Gregorios Orthodox Church
- Erathukulakkada Mar Gregorios Orthodox Church
- Kadamanthadom Mar Gregorios Orthodox Church
- Karimthottuva St. Mary's Orthodox Church
- St. Mary's Orthodox Syrian Church, Kallada
- St. George Orthodox Church, East Kallada
- St. George Orthodox Church, Kareepra
- St. George Orthodox Church, Puthoor
- Kunathoor St. George Orthodox Church
- Kulakkada St.George Orthodox Church
- Kadeeshtha Orthodox Church, Kundara
- St. Thomas Orthodox Church, Kundara
- St. George Orthodox Church, Kaithacode
- St. Elijah Orthodox Church, Koduvila
- Kollam Kadeesha Orthodox Church
- St. Thomas Orthodox Cathedral, Kollam
- Mar Semavoon Desthuni Orthodox Church, Manjakala
- St. Mary's Salem Orthodox Church, Manappally
- St. George Orthodox Church, Maruthoorbhagam
- Mar Thevodoros Orthodox Church, Madhavasseri
- St. Peter and Paul Orthodox Church, Maranadu
- Mar Barsauma Orthodox Church, Maranadu
- St. Stephen's Orthodox Church, Mukhathala
- St.George Orthodox Church, Mukhathala
- St. Mary's Orthodox Church, Muthupilakkadu
- St. George Orthodox Church, Muthupilakkadu
- St. Mary's Orthodox Church, Mynagapally
- St. George Orthodox Church, Nallila
- St. Gabriel Orthodox Church, Nallila
- St. George Orthodox Church, Nadutheri
- St. Mary's Orthodox Church, Nedumbaikulam
- St. George Orthodox Church, Nedumbaikulam
- St. Thomas Orthodox Church, Pattazhy
- St. George Orthodox Church, Pattazhy
- St. Mary's Orthodox Church, Pattazhy
- Mar Gregorios Orthodox Church, Pattazhy
- St. Stephen's Orthodox Church, Pandithitta
- St. Thomas Orthodox Church, Perinadu
- Mar Kuriakose Orthodox Church, Perayam
- St. John the Baptist Orthodox Church, Perumpuzha
- St. George Orthodox Church, Puthoor
- Mar Baselios Gregorios Orthodox Church, Poruvazhy
- St. Thomas Orthodox Church, Sooranad
- St. Mary's Orthodox Church, Sooranad
- St. Thomas Orthodox Valiyapally, Thazhava
- St. Mary's Orthodox Church, Thalavoor
- Marthamariam Orthodox Church, Thamarakkudy
- Marthamariam Orthodox Church, Thevalakara
- St. George Orthodox Church, Thevalappuram
- St. George Orthodox Church, Kundara Kuzhimathikadu
- St. Mary's Orthodox Church, Perinad
- St. Thomas Orthodox puthenpally, Thrippilazhikom
- St. Thomas Orthodox sehion church, Thrippilazhikom

== Gallery ==
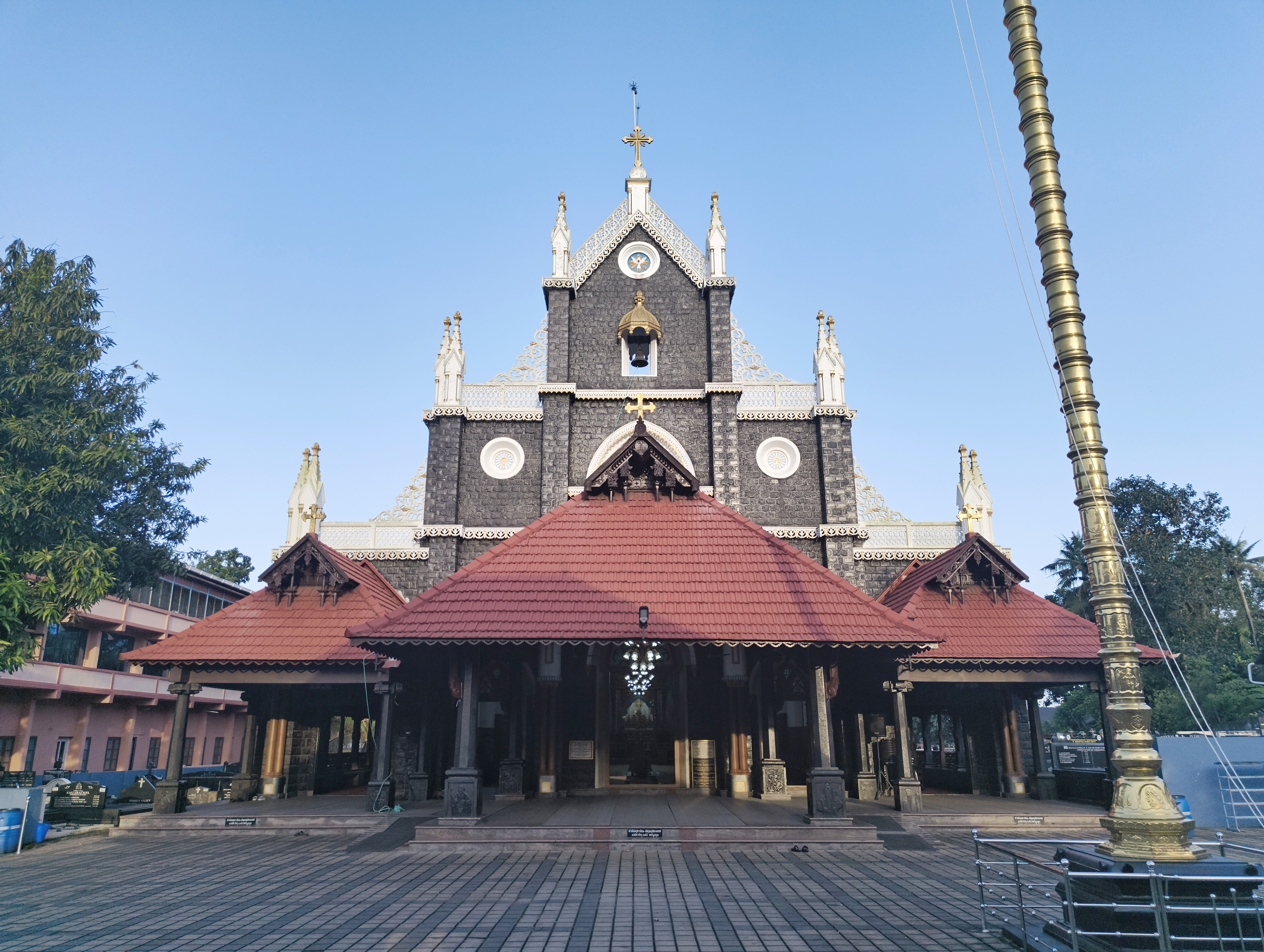
St. Thomas Orthodox Syrian Church, Kundara

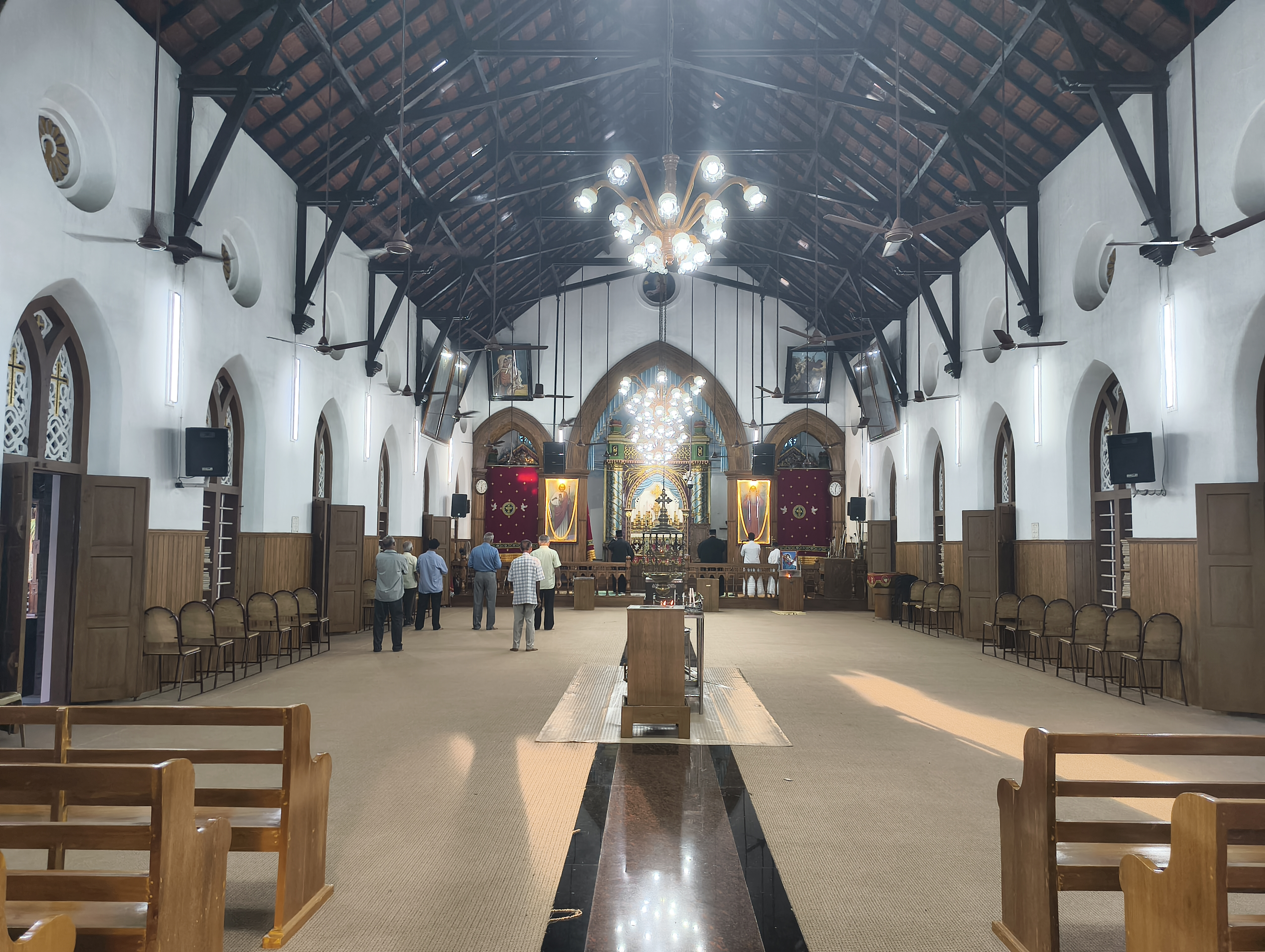
Holy Altar of St. Thomas Orthodox Syrian Church, Kundara.
