= Zachariah Nicholovos =

Oriental Orthodox bishop

- Church: Malankara Orthodox Syrian Church
- Diocese: Malankara Orthodox Diocese of Northeast America
- In office: 1993 – Present

Orders
- Ordination: 15 Aug 1993

Personal details
- Born: 13 August 1959 (age 66) Mepral, Kerala, India

Zachariah Nicholovos is the Metropolitan of Northeast American Diocese of Malankara Orthodox Syrian Church.

He was consecrated by Patriarch Ignatius Zakka I on 15 August 1993 and subsequently served as Archbishop of the Malankara Archdiocese of the Syriac Orthodox Church in North America.

The 1995 verdict of the Supreme Court of India upheld the constitution of the Malankara Orthodox Syrian Church and initiated a process aimed at reconciliation between the Catholicos and Patriarch factions, and he subsequently took part in the Supreme Court mandated and court observed Malankara Association meeting at Parumala on 20 March 2002.

Patriarch Ignatius Zakka I issued an order on 22 December 2001, relieving him of all spiritual and administrative authority, and subsequently issued a further order on 12 March 2003, formally recording his excommunication and removal from office.
