= Zachariah Severios =

His Grace Zachariah Mar Severios
- Church: Malankara Orthodox Syrian Church
- Diocese: Idukki Diocese
- Installed: 3 November 2022
- Predecessor: Mathews Mar Severios (as Diocese In-charge)
- Other post: Assistant Metropolitan of the Kandanad West Diocese (since 2024)

Personal details
- Born: Zachariah John; 19 August 1978 (age 48) Vakathanam, Kottayam, Kerala, India
- Residence: Gedseemon Aramana, Chakkupallom, Idukki
- Parents: Very Rev. C. John Cor-Episcopa (father); Lissy John (mother)
- Occupation: Bishop, Author
- Education: Government Law College, Thiruvananthapuram; Orthodox Theological Seminary, Kottayam; Serampore University; MG University

Zachariah Mar Severios (born 19 August 1978) is a Metropolitan of the Malankara Orthodox Syrian Church. He currently serves as the Metropolitan of the Idukki Diocese and as the Assistant Metropolitan of the Kandanad West Diocese. Outside of his ecclesiastical duties, he is a prolific author writing under the pseudonym "Zacher."

== Early life and education ==
Zachariah John was born on 19 August 1978 into the Chirathilatt family in Vakathanam, Kottayam. He is the son of the Very Rev. C. John Cor-Episcopa and Lissy John.

He earned an LL.B. from the Government Law College, Thiruvananthapuram. His theological training was completed at the Orthodox Theological Seminary, Kottayam (GST) and Serampore University (BD). He later obtained a Master of Arts in Syriac Literature from Mahatma Gandhi University.

== Ecclesiastical career ==
He was ordained as a deacon and priest in 2006 by H.G. Geevarghese Mar Ivanios. On 25 February 2022, he was elected to the bishopric by the Malankara Syrian Christian Association at Kolencherry.

He was professed as a monk (Ramban) on 2 June 2022 at Parumala Seminary. On 28 July 2022, he was consecrated as a Metropolitan by Baselios Marthoma Mathews III at St. Mary's Cathedral, Pazhanji. He was formally enthroned as the Metropolitan of the Idukki Diocese on 3 November 2022. In 2024, he was additionally appointed as the Assistant Metropolitan of the Kandanad West Diocese.

== Literary works ==
Under the pen name Zacher, he has authored over 15 books focusing on Eastern Christian spirituality.

Notable titles include:

- Gethsemaneyile Malakhamar (Angels of Gethsemane)
- Nishabda Sanidhyam (Silent Presence)
- Sneha Sparsham (The Touch of Love)
- Sthithaprajnan (The Equanimous)
