= Manappally =

- village
- Location in Kerala, India Manappally (India)
- Coordinates: 9°5′0″N 76°32′0″E
- Country: India
- State: Kerala
- District: Kollam

Population (2011)
  - Total: 23,341

Languages
  - Official: Malayalam, English
- Time zone: UTC+5:30 (IST)
- PIN: 690574
- Telephone code: 0476
- Vehicle registration: KL-23
- Nearest city: Kollam (33.5 km)

Manppally is a small village located near Thazhava, Kollam district, Kerala, India.

== Politics ==
Manappally is a part of Karunagappally assembly constituency in Alappuzha (Lok Sabha constituency). Shri. CR Mahesh is the current MLA of Karunagappally. Shri.K. C. Venugopal is the current member of parliament of Alappuzha.

== Religion ==
St Mary's Salem Orthodox Church, located here is a part of Kollam Diocese of Malankara Orthodox Syrian Church and is dedicated to Saint Mary. It is also Known as 'Thekkinte Manarkadu', all religions co-exist here, especially Islam, Hinduism, and to a smaller extent Christianity.
