= Kottarakkara Punalur Orthodox Diocese =

Diocese of the Malankara Orthodox Syrian Church in India

Diocese of Kottarakkara Punalur

Orthodox
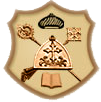
- Catholicate Emblem

Location
- Country: India
- Territory: Kottarakkara, Punalur
- Metropolitan: H. G. Yuhanon Mar Thevodoros
- Headquarters: Kottapuram Seminary, Pulamon, Kottarakara

Information
- First holder: H.G. Yuhanon Mar Thevodoros
- Rite: Malankara Rite
- Established: 15 August 2010
- Diocese: Kottarakara Punalur Diocese
- Parent church: Malankara Orthodox Syrian Church

Website
- Kottarakara Punalur Diocese

Kottarakkara Punalur Diocese is one of the 32 dioceses of the Malankara Orthodox Syrian Church. The diocese was created after dividing the then existed Thiruvananthapuram Diocese and Kollam Diocese on 15 August 2010. The diocese was inaugurated on 23 January 2011. Yuhanon Mar Thevodoros was installed the first Metropolitan of the diocese. Kottarakkara Kottappuram Seminary is the Bishop house of the Diocese. Fr. Philip Mathew served as the diocesan secretary. The diocesan secretary is Fr. C D Rajan.

== Diocesan Secretaries ==
List of Diocesan Secretaries
From	Until	Secretary
2010	2012	Fr.Alex P. Zachariah
2012	2017	Fr.Philip Mathew Ampalathumkala
2017	Present	Fr.C D Rajan Nellila

== Diocesan Metropolitans ==
Kottarakkara Punalur Orthodox Diocesan Metropolitans
From	Until	Metropolitan	Notes
2010	Present	Yuhanon Mar Thevodoros	1st Metropolitan of the diocese

== Parishes ==
- St. George Orthodox Church, Ampalathumkala, Kottarakkara
- St. Gregorios Orthodox Church, Alakkuzhy
- St. George Orthodox Church, Ambalakara
- Mar Yakob Burdana Orthodox Church, Ambalathumkala
- St. George Orthodox Church, Ambanadu
- St. Mary's Orthodox Church, Aringada
- St. Mary's Orthodox Church, Avaneeswaram
- Mar Aprem Orthodox Church, Chakkuvarakkal
- Chaliakkara St. Mary's Orthodox Church, Chaliakkara St. Mary's
- St. George Orthodox Church, Jayabharatham, Chemmanthoor
- St. John's Orthodox Church, Chemmanthoor
- Mar Gregorios Orthodox Church, Chembanaruvi
- St. Mary's Orthodox Church, Edamon
- St. George Orthodox Church, Elambal
- St. George Salem Orthodox Church, Iypalloor
- Mar Baselios Mar Gregorios Orthodox Valiyapalli, Kalayapuram
- St. Mary's Orthodox Church, Kalayapuram
- St. George Orthodox Church, Karavaloor
- St. George Orthodox Church, Karavoor
- St. George Orthodox Church, Karavoor
- St. Ignathios Orthodox Church, Kottappuram
- St. George Orthodox Church, Kuttiyilbhagom
- Mar Gregorios Orthodox Church, Manlil
- Mar Gregorios Orthodox Church Marangadu
- St. George Orthodox Church, Melila
- St. Stephen's Orthodox Church, Mylom
- St. Mary's Orthodox Church, Narikkal
- St. George Orthodox Church, Nedumpara
- St. Mary's Orthodox Church, Neeleswaram
- Mar Gregarious Orthodox Church, Nellikunnam
- St. George Orthodox Church, Nellikunnam
- St. George Orthodox Church, Njarakkadu, Kunnicodu
- St. George Orthodox Church, Odanavattom
- St. John's Orthodox Church, Ottakkal
- St. George Orthodox Church, Kottarakkara, Padinjaretheruvu
- Mar Baselios Mar Gregorios Orthodox Church, Palanirappu
- St. George Orthodox Church, Pattamala
- St. George Orthodox Church, Perumkuzhy
- St. George Orthodox Church, Kalayapuram, (കലയപുരം ചെറിയപള്ളി)
- St. George Orthodox Church, Punalur Papermill
- St. George Orthodox Church, Puthoothadam
- St. Gregorious Orthodox Church, Sadanandapuram
- St. George Orthodox Church, Thenmala
- St. George Orthodox Church, Thollikode
- St. George Orthodox Church, Thrikkannamangal
- St. George Orthodox Church, Bethel, Uliyanad
- St. George & St. Mary's Orthodox Church, Uliyanad
- Mar Semavoon Desthuni Orthodox Church, Ummannur
- St. George Orthodox Church, Urukunnu
- St. John's Orthodox Church, Vadakode
- St. George Orthodox Church, Valakode
- St. Gregorios Orthodox Church, Valakom
- Mar Bersowma Orthodox Church, Vengoor
- St. Stephen's Orthodox Church, Vengoor
- St. Thomas Orthodox Church, Vilayanthoor
- St. Mary's Orthodox Church, Villoor
- St. George Orthodox Church, Kulamudy
- St. Gregorios Orthodox Church, Chithrapuri, Kariara, Punalur

== See also ==
- Baselios Mar Thoma Paulose II
