= Pathamuttom =

Town in Kerala, India

Pathamuttom പാത്താമുട്ടം
- Large Village
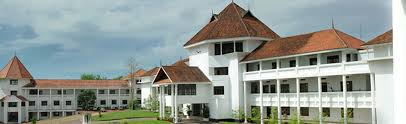
- Saintgits College of Engineering

- Location within India
- Coordinates: 9°30′43″N 76°33′1″E
- Country: India
- State: Kerala
- District: Kottayam
- ISO 3166 code: IN-KL

Pathamuttom is a village in the Kottayam district, in the Indian state of Kerala. Stephanos Mar Theodosius, the bishop of the Calcutta Diocese of the Malankara Orthodox Church, was born there.

== Location ==
It is located 8 km (5.0 mi) south of the Kottayam District headquarters, 4 km (2.5 mi) from Pallom, and 145 km (90 mi) from the state capital, Thiruvananthapuram. Kottayam, Changanassery, Thiruvalla, and Alappuzha are the closest cities to Pathamuttom. Pathamuttom is situated 5.5 km (3.4 mi) from Chingavanam, 5.5 km (3.4 mi) from Changanacherry, and 25.2 km (15.7 mi) from Mannar. It is also 16.6 km (10.3 mi) from Kottayam Railway Station. Popular tourist centres like Kumarakom, Alleppey, Kuttanad and Mararikulam, are located near Pathamuttom.

== Language ==
Malayalam is the most widely used languages in Pathamuttom.

== Education ==
=== Saintgits College of Engineering ===
The Saintgits College of Engineering is in Pathamuttom. The college was founded in 2002 by a group of educators. Their primary focus for the institution was to expose young minds to the world of technology.
