= Baselios Shukrallah of Aleppo =

Maphriano of Syriac Orthodox Church from 1748 to 1760

Saint Baselios Mor Shukrallah of Aleppo
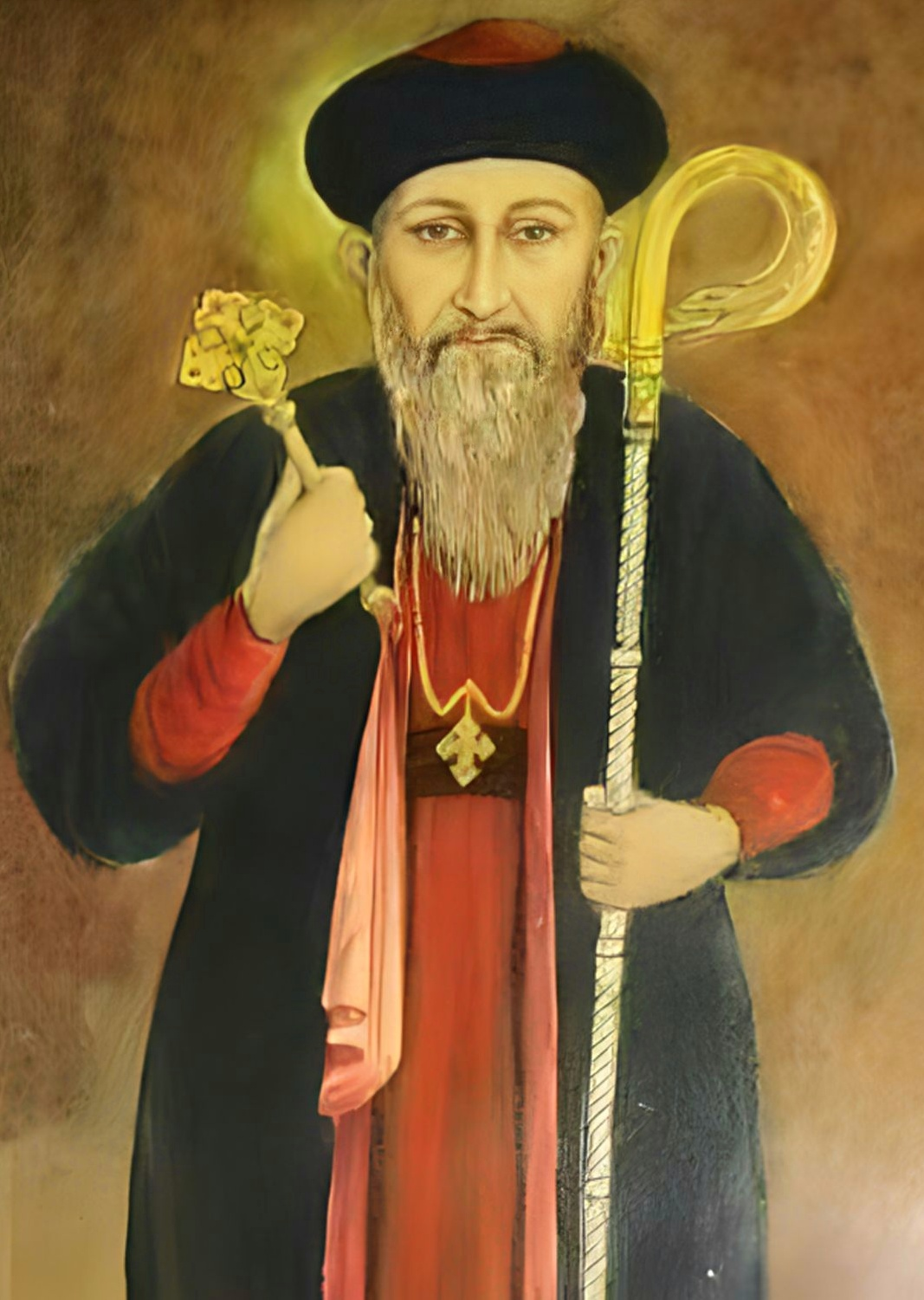
- 18th century artwork by an unknown artist

Maphriano / Catholicos of the East
- Born: Shukrallah Qasabji; 1st decade of 18th century Aleppo
- Died: 20 October 1764; Matancherry
- Venerated in: Syriac Orthodox Church
- Canonized: 21 October 2008 by Ignatius Zakka I Iwas
- Major shrine: Marth Mariam Cathedral, Kandanad
- Feast: 22 October

Baselios Shukrallah (Note: Also spelled as Shakrallah.) of Aleppo was the Maphriano of the East in the Syriac Orthodox Church from 1748 to 1760. He was the Metropolitan of Aleppo (1746–1748) before he became the Maphriayano of the East. Maphriyano Shukrallah journey from Aleppo to India was long and he arrived in India in 1751 and was buried at Marth Mariam Cathedral Kandanad (Kizhakkinde Yerushulem) in 1764 AD.

In 2008, Baselios Shukrallah was declared a saint by the Patriarch Ignatius Zakka I of the Syriac Orthodox Church.

== Life in Aleppo ==
=== Childhood ===
Shukrallah Qasabji (Note: Qasabji is a compound Arabic/Turkish word, referring to "a weaver of silk cloth embroidered with silver and gold threads") was born as the son of Moses al-Qasabji in Aleppo in the first decade of the 18th century. His father was a deacon who made a living by weaving silk cloth embroidered with silver and gold threads. His maternal grandfather was the deacon Yunan (Jonah), son of Shim'un, a priest of Aleppo.In his childhood, Shukrallah studied Syriac and Arabic and later became proficient in Syriac.

=== Church life ===
Shukrallah became involved in spiritual life and was ordained as a deacon before 1728. Dionysius Georgios (Note: Also spelled as Dionysius Jijris) of Aleppo (later Patriarch Georgios III) ordained Shukrallah as a priest and appointed him as his assistant. He later became a monk at the Monastery of Mar Musa the Abyssinian, Nabk.When the Dionysius Georgios ascended to the throne of Patriarch in 1745, Shukrallah was ordained as a metropolitan of Aleppo in 1746 to fill in the vacancy. He took the name 'Dionysios' on his ordination.

== Malankara Maphrian ==
On receiving letters from Mar Ivanios al-Arqugianyi and Mar Thoma V in Malankara, Patriarch Dionysius Georgios decided to send Shukrallah to India. He consecrated Shukrallah under the name 'Baselios'. Ivanios also requested that Shukrallah be consecrated as Maphrian first and then sent to India.On departure from Aleppo, Baselios Shukrallah was accompanied by Mar Gregorios Yuhanna, the metropolitan of Jerusalem. Mar Severus Yuhanna was also originally scheduled to accompany Shukrallah on his journey. However, he did not join the delegation as he fell ill while awaiting the arrival of the delegation in Baghdad.

=== Arrival in Malabar ===
The delegation led by Baselios Shukrallah Maphrian arrived on 23 April 1751 in Cochin. On his arrival, Shukrallah wrote letters to Mar Thoma V and Mar Ivanios. Mar Ivanios arrived after three weeks and disagreed with Shukrallah on how Indians should be treated, favouring beatings and insults. Eventually Shukrallah had the Dutch Governor detain him and dispatch him back to Syria in November 1751.

=== Quarrel with Mar Thoma V ===
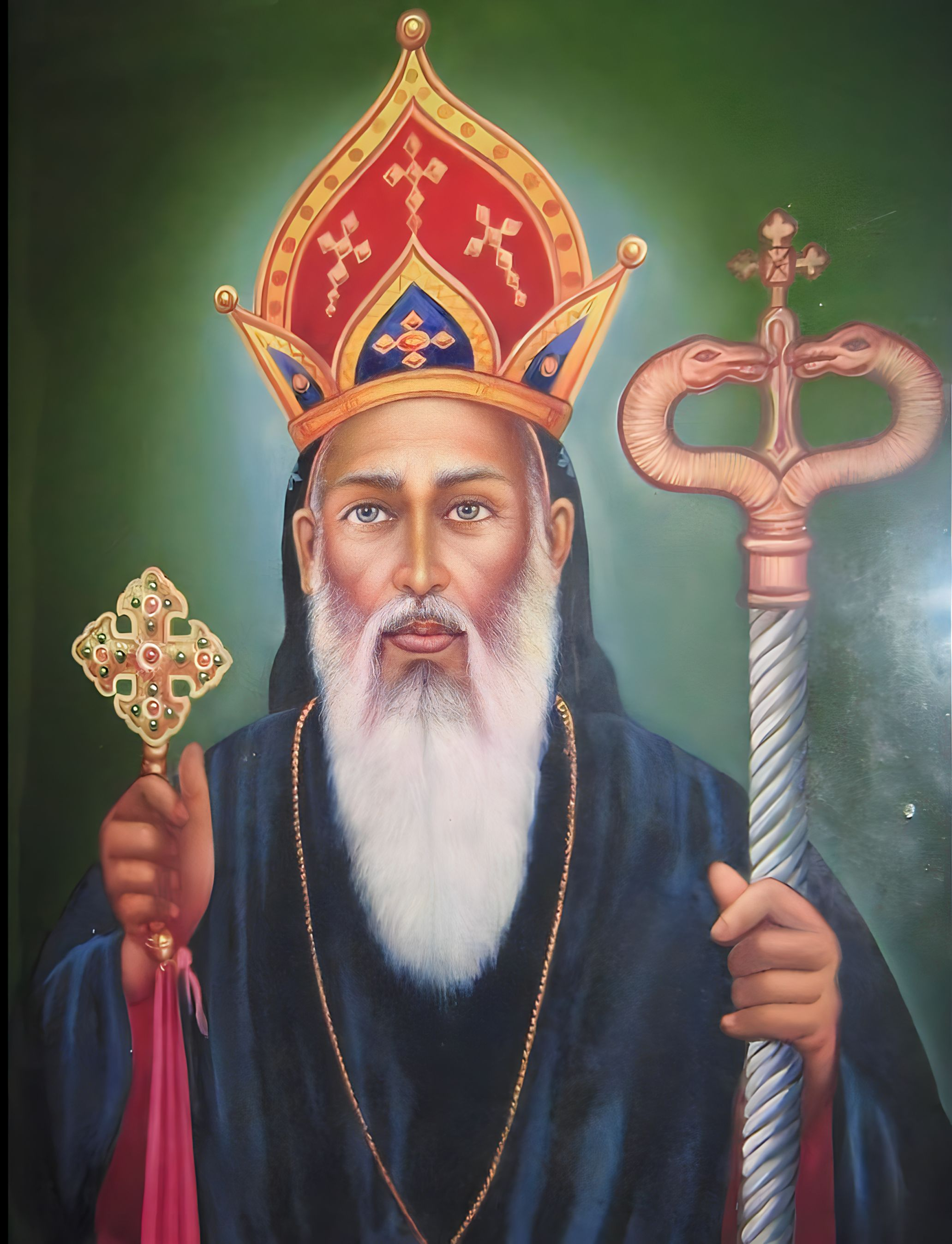
Thoma V

When Mar Thoma heard of the Maphrian's arrival, he sent some priests and leaders to receive the delegation to the Kandanad Church. Mar Thoma himself refused to meet the delegation. A journal written by Shukrallah covering years 1751–1752 talks about the succession of promises to meet followed by excuses for not doing so on part of Mar Thoma. The reason behind Mar Thoma's failure to meet the delegation is that they were still under Dutch protection and Mar Thoma had not reimbursed the visitors' fares. Faced with a potential arrest by the Dutch authorities, Mar Thoma kept his distance from the delegation.

Eventually, Syrian Christians directed the Antiochene bishops to Kandanad, a village where Syrian bishops have always resided.

==== Intervening in churches ====
Frustrated by Mar Thoma, The Maphrian devoted his attention to reorganising the Church. He removed the Roman Catholic elements from the Kothamangalam Church and installed steps and a canopy over the thrones. He also convinced the priests to wear the vestments Metropolitans Gregorios Abdal Jaleel and Baselios Yeldo brought along. Shukrallah had also done some alterations to the Kandanad Church, which were removed by the Mar Thoma when he visited the church. The local priests restored them and reported this incident to the Maphrian.

Shukrallah Maphrian then ordained several priests and deacons on Maundy Thursday while presiding over the Holy Week ceremonies in the Kandanad church. Few days later, he consecrated Rabban Yuhanna as Mar Ivanios of Malabar.

== Bibliography ==
- Barsoum, Aphrem (2009). History of the Syriac Dioceses.
- Barsoum, Ephrem (2003). The Scattered Pearls: A History Of Syriac Literature And Sciences.
- Fenwick, John R.K (2009). The Forgotten Bishops : The Malabar Independent Syrian Church and Its Place in the Story of the St. Thomas Christians of South India. Gorgias Press. OCLC 704519618.
- Kaniamparampil, C. Corepiscopa (1989). The Syrian Orthodox Church in India and Its Apostolic Faith (PDF). Tiruvalla,Kerala: National Offset Press.
