= Malankara Archdiocese of North America =

Malankara Archdiocese of the Syriac Orthodox Church in North America
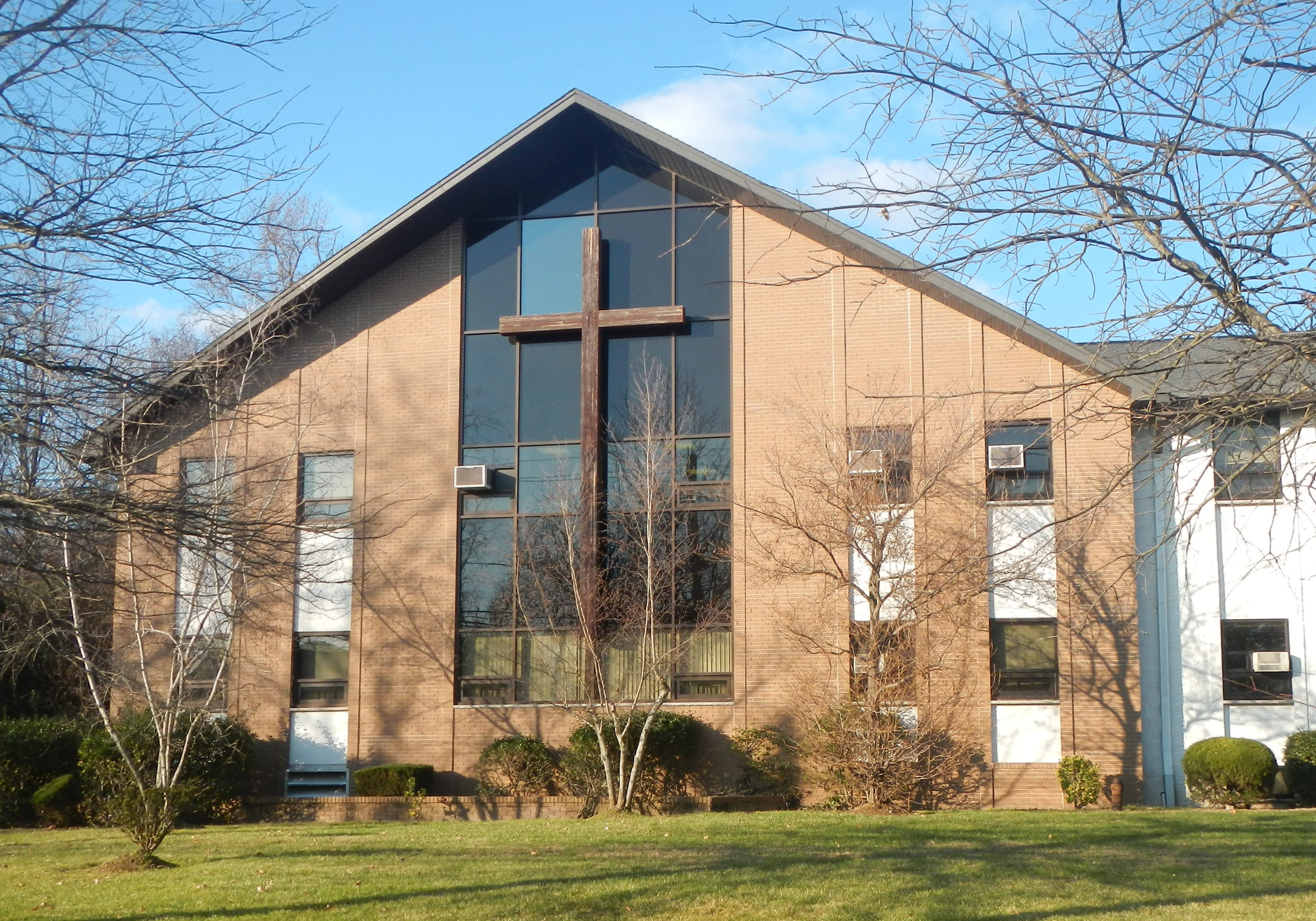

Location
- Jurisdiction: North America
- Regions: Northeast USA, West USA, South USA, Southeast USA, Midwest USA, Canada

Leadership
- Patriarch: Ignatius Aphrem II
- Catholicos: Baselios Joseph
- Archbishop: Titus Yeldho

History
- Established: 1993
- First Hierarch: Athanasius Yeshue Samuel

Information
- Denomination: Oriental Orthodox
- Church: Syriac Orthodox Church
- Affiliation: Malankara Syriac Orthodox Church
- Rite: West Syriac rite
- Calendar: Gregorian Calendar
- Languages: Classical Syriac, Malayalam, English
- Cathedral: Dayro d'Mor Ephrem, Old Tappan, NJ
- Headquarters: Malankara Archdiocese Headquarters, Old Tappan, NJ

Statistics
- Parishes: 85
- Congregations: 29
- Priests: 80

Website
- https://malankara.com/

The Malankara Archdiocese of the Syriac Orthodox Church in North America is an archdiocese of the Syriac Orthodox Church headquartered in New Jersey.

This archdiocese comprises all the Malankara Syriac Orthodox parishes in the United States and Canada. It is headed by Mor Titus Yeldho who has served as the archbishop and patriarchal vicar since 2004.

== History ==
Beginning in the 1960s, a significant number of immigrants from Kerala settled in North America. Many of these immigrants were a part of the Malankara Syriac Orthodox Church and maintained their Syriac Orthodox faith and traditions after migration. With the approval of Mor Athanasius Yeshue Samuel, Archbishop of North America, the first Malankara Syriac Orthodox parish in North America—Mor Gregorios Syrian Orthodox Church—was established in 1975 in Staten Island, New York. Under the leadership of Rev. Fr. John Jacob (later Mor Philexenos Yuhannon), additional parishes were formed across the United States. Several spiritual and community organizations, including Sunday School programs, the Malankara Syrian Orthodox Youth Association (MGSOSA), St. Mary’s Women’s League, and St. Paul’s Men's Fellowship, were later created to serve the growing immigrant population. In 1986, Malankara parishes started to organize annual conferences throughout North America.

To coordinate parish activities, a Malankara council was formed in 1987 under the ecclesiastical jurisdiction of the Syriac Orthodox Archdiocese of North America. As the community expanded, delegates at a 1992 meeting in New York resolved to request Mor Ignatius Zakka I, the Patriarch of Antioch to appoint a Malayali bishop to assist Archbishop Samuel in administering the parishes. At a subsequent meeting held on December 5, 1992, in Hackensack, New Jersey, Fr. P. G. Cherian was proposed for episcopal consecration.

In 1993, Patriarch Ignatius Zakka I established an independent archdiocese for the Malankara faithful in North America designated the Malankara Archdiocese of the Syrian Orthodox Church in North America. Rev. Fr. P. G. Cherian was consecrated as Mor Nicholovos Zachariah on August 15, 1993, and appointed as its first archbishop.

In December 2001, Nicholovos Zachariah separated from the Syriac Orthodox Church and was subsequently excommunicated by Patriarch Ignatius Zakka I Iwas. Following this, Mor Julius Kuriakose and Mor Ivanios Mathews were appointed as patriarchal vicars to administer the archdiocese.

On January 4, 2004, Fr. Yeldho Pathickal was consecrated Mor Titus Yeldho, archbishop of the Malankara Archdiocese of North America. Under his leadership, the archdiocese expanded its administrative structure and relocated its headquarters several times, ultimately establishing its center in Old Tappan, New Jersey. Numerous new parishes were founded during his tenure across the United States and Canada.

== Archbishops ==
- Mor Athanasius Yeshue Samuel – Until August 1993
- Mor Nicholovos Zachariah – August 1993 – December 2001
- Mor Julius Kuriakose - December 22, 2001 - March 1, 2002
- Mor Ivanios Mathews - March 2, 2002 - January 3, 2004
- Mor Titus Yeldho- January 4, 2004 - Present

== Organization of the archdiocese ==
=== Churches ===
Church	City, State
St. Ephrem Jacobite Cathedral	Old Tappan, New Jersey
St. Peter Syrian Orthodox Church	Phoenix, Arizona
St. Mary's Syrian Orthodox Church	Los Angeles, California
St. Mary's Syrian Orthodox Church	San Francisco, California
St. Baselios Yeldho Syrian Orthodox Church	Sacramento, California
St. Ignatius of Antioch Syrian Orthodox Congregation	San Diego, California
St. Stephen’s Syriac Orthodox Congregation	San Jose, California
St. Mary's Syrian Orthodox Church	Denver, Colorado
St. Ephrem Syriac Orthodox Congregation	Orlando, Florida
St. Mary's Syriac Orthodox Church	Miami, Florida
Mar Gregorios Syrian Orthodox Church	Tampa, Florida
St. Mary's Malankara Syriac Orthodox Church	Atlanta, Georgia
St. Mary's Syrian Orthodox Church	Augusta, Georgia
St. George Syrian Orthodox Church	Chicago, Illinois
St. Peter’s Syrian Orthodox Church	Chicago, Illinois
St. John The Baptist’s Syrian Orthodox Congregation (Formerly named St. Mary)	Washington D.C., Maryland
St. Thomas Syrian Orthodox Church	Baltimore, Maryland
St. Baselios Yeldho Malankara Syrian Orthodox Church	Boston, Massachusetts
St. Mary’s Malankara Syrian Orthodox Church	Detroit, Michigan
St. Simon The Stylite’s Syrian Orthodox Congregation	Minneapolis, Minnesota
St. George Syrian Orthodox Church	Charlotte, North Carolina
St. John's Syriac Orthodox Congregation	Raleigh, North Carolina
St. Mary's Syriac Orthodox Church	Bergenfield, New Jersey
St. George Syrian Orthodox Church	Carteret, New Jersey
St. James Syrian Orthodox Church	Wanaque, New Jersey
St Mary's Malankara Syrian Orthodox Congregation	Albany, New York
St. Mary’s Jacobite Congregation	Glen Oaks, New York
Mar Gregorios Syrian Orthodox Church	Staten Island, New York
St. George Syrian Orthodox Church	Spring Valley, New York
St. George Syrian Orthodox Church	New City, New York
St. Mary's Syrian Orthodox Church	Lynbrook, New York
St. Peter's & St. Paul's Malankara Syrian Orthodox Church	Massapequa, New York
St. Mary's Syrian Orthodox Church	West Nyack, New York
St. Mary's Syrian Orthodox Church	White Plains, New York
St. Baselios Yeldho Syrian Orthodox Congregation	Cleveland, Ohio
St. Basil The Great Jacobite Congregation	Dayton, Ohio
St. George Syrian Orthodox Church	Oklahoma City, Oklahoma
St. Ignatius Elias III’s Syrian Orthodox Congregation	Portland, Oregon
St. Paul's Syrian Orthodox Church	Philadelphia, Pennsylvania
St. Peter's Syrian Orthodox Cathedral	Philadelphia, Pennsylvania
St. Thomas’s Syriac Orthodox Church	Austin, Texas
St. Ignatius’s Malankara Syrian Orthodox Cathedral	Dallas, Texas
St. Mary's Syrian Orthodox Church	Houston, Texas
St. Mary's Syrian Orthodox Church	Carrollton, Texas
St. Baselios Yeldho Syriac Orthodox Church	Houston, Texas
St. Theodora’s Jacobite Congregation	Houston, Texas
St. Thomas Jacobite Chapel	Royse City, Texas
Mar Gregorios Syriac Orthodox Church	Mesquite, Texas
St. George Syrian Orthodox Church	Chantilly, Virginia
St. Jacob Baraddeus Syrian Orthodox Congregation	Richmond, Virginia
Syrian Orthodox Congregation	Virginia Beach, Virginia
St. George Malankara Syrian Orthodox Church	Seattle, Washington
Canada
St. Thomas Jacobite Church	Calgary, Alberta
St. Jacob Baraddeus Jacobite Church	Edmonton, Alberta
Jacobite Congregation	Castlegar, British Columbia
St. Severus Jacobite Congregation	Dawson Creek, British Columbia
Jacobite Congregation	Ladysmith, British Columbia
Mar Shemavoon Desthuni Jacobite Congregation	Prince George, British Columbia
St. Gregorios Jacobite Congregation	Vancouver, British Columbia
St. John The Apostle Jacobite Congregation	Winnipeg, Manitoba
St. Ignatius of Antioch Jacobite Congregation	Moncton, New Brunswick
St. Mary’s Jacobite Congregation	Grand Falls-Windsor, Newfoundland and Labrador
St. Mark’s Jacobite Congregation	Halifax, Nova Scotia
St. Ephrem Jacobite Congregation	Sydney, Nova Scotia
St. Paul’s Jacobite Congregation	Barrie, Ontario
St. Thomas Jacobite Congregation	Belleville, Ontario
St. Andrew’s Jacobite Church	Bowmanville, Ontario
St. George Jacobite Church	Brampton, Ontario
St. Kuriakose Jacobite Congregation	Brantford, Ontario
St. Thomas Jacobite Congregation	Hamilton, Ontario
St. Stephen’s Jacobite Congregation	Kitchener, Ontario
St. Gregorios’s Jacobite Church	London, Ontario
St. Mary's Jacobite Church	Mississauga, Ontario
St. Peter's Jacobite Church	Mississauga, Ontario
Mor Kauma Jacobite Congregation	Niagara Falls, Ontario
St. John’s Jacobite Congregation	North York, Ontario
St. Ignatius Elias III Jacobite Congregation	Ottawa, Ontario
St. Behanan and St. Sarah’s Jacobite Congregation	Sudbury, Ontario
St. James Jacobite Congregation	Thunder Bay, Ontario
Jerusalem Martha Mariam Jacobite Church	Toronto, Ontario
Marth Smooni Jacobite Congregation	Windsor, Ontario
St. John The Baptist’s Jacobite Congregation	Charlottetown, Prince Edward Island
St. Gregorios Abdul Jaleel Jacobite Congregation	Montreal, Quebec
St. Baselios Yeldho Jacobite Congregation	Regina, Saskatchewan
St. George Jacobite Congregation	Saskatoon, Saskatchewan

=== Organizations ===
- Antiochean True Faith
- Archdiocesan Choir
- Clergy Association
- St. Paul's Men's Fellowship
- St. Mary's Women's League
- Mar Gregorios Syrian Orthodox Young Adults
- Mar Gregorios Syrian Orthodox Student Association
- Malankara Syriac Orthodox Sunday School Association
