= Adoor Kadampanad Orthodox Diocese =

Diocese of the Malankara Orthodox Syrian Church in India

Diocese of Adoor Kadampanad

Orthodox
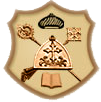
- Catholicate Emblem

Location
- Country: India
- Territory: Adoor, Kadampanad
- Metropolitan: H.G Dr. Zacharias Mar Aprem
- Headquarters: Sreyas Aramana, Mar Epiphanios Centre, Kannamcode, Adoor P.O Pathanamthitta – 691 523

Information
- First holder: Zacharias Mar Aprem
- Rite: Malankara Rite
- Established: 15 August 2010
- Diocese: Adoor Kadampanad Diocese

Current leadership
- Parent church: Malankara Orthodox Syrian Church
- Bishop: HG Dr.Zacharias Mar Aprem

Website
- Adoor Kadampanad Diocese

Adoor Kadampanad Diocese is one of 32 dioceses of the Malankara Orthodox Syrian Church. The diocese was established on 15 August 2010. HG Dr.Zacharias Mar Aprem is the first Metropolitan of the diocese since 2010.

Metropolitan Dr. Zacharias Mar Aprem has born to Mr. E.K. Kuriakose and Mrs. Sossamma Kuriakose in March 11, 1966 in an ancient family (Kaduvettoor) in Kerala, South India. He belongs to the Malankara Orthodox Church. After his graduation from Malabar Christian College, Calicut (B. Sc. in Chemistry) he pursued his theological studies (B.D) in the Orthodox Theological Seminary, Kottayam, Kerala and Master of Theology (M. Th.) in Religion) in Gurukul Lutheran Theological College & Research Institute, Chennai. He earned his Ph.D in Advaita Vedanta from Serampore University, Kolkota.

He has been teaching as Professor in the Department of Religion & Philosophy, Orthodox Theological Seminary, Kottayam since 1999. On deputation he served as the Principal Secretary to the Late Lamented Catholicos His Holiness Baselios Marthoma Didymus I, the then supreme head of the Malankara Orthodox Church, from 2005 to 2010. In 2010 he was consecrated Metropolitan of the Diocese of Adoor- Kadambanad. He served as the Assistant to the Catholicos and Malankara Metropolitan from 2010 to 2019 of Late Lamented His Holiness Baselios Marthoma Paulose II. He served the Church and the Seminary in various capacities such as the Registrar of the Seminary, member of bodies such as Ecumenical Relations Committee, Seminary Governing Board, Working Committee of the Church, Catholic-Orthodox Dialogue Commission, National Council of Churches in India (NCCI), Vice President of Kerala Christian Council (KCC), Vice President of Bible Society of India (Kerala Auxiliary) and Chief Editor of 'Malankara Sabha' the official Magazine of the Church. He was the President of the Senate of Serampore University from 2019- 2025. At present he is serving following capacities: 1. Metropolitan of Adoor – Kadampanadu Diocese 2. Corporate Manager, MOC Colleges 3. Director, Sruti School of Liturgical Music 6. Manager: a. St. Cyrils College, Adoor c. St. Mary's Higher Secondary School, Adoor d. St. Thomas HS & Higher Secondary School, Kadampanad He resides at CHAYALODU ASHRAM, a nature friendly remote and quiet place, 8 km from Adoor.

This diocese is a stronghold of monasticism in the Malankara Orthodox Syrian Church, with the Monastery of St. George(Chayalode St. George Ashram) having 9 monks,Mount Tabor Monastery, Pathanapuram with 51 monks along with the convents of Mount Tabor Convent, Pathanapuram which has 50 nuns, Nazareth Convent in Kadampanad with 19 nuns, and St Mary's Convent in Adoor with 8 nuns.

The population of the Kadampanad region, over which this diocese has jurisdiction is majority Malankara Orthodox, making it one of the few places in Kerala where Orthodox Church members form the total majority of the population.

The diocese's co-cathedrals of Saint Thomas Orthodox Cathedral, Adoor and Saint Thomas Orthodox Cathedral, Kadampanad have about 1,100 and 1,400 member families, respectively.

== History ==
Adoor Kadampanad Diocese was created on 15 September 2010. H.G. Dr.Zacharias Mar Aprem serves as its first Metropolitan. The diocese was created mainly by the partition of Kollam Diocese. Some parishes of Mavelikara Diocese, Chenganur Diocese and Thumpamon dioceses are added to this diocese.

== Diocesan Metropolitans ==
Adoor Kadampanad Orthodox Diocesan Metropolitans
From	Until	Metropolitan	Notes
2010		Zacharias mar Aprem	1st Metropolitan of the diocese

== Parish list ==
=== Adoor ===
- St. Mary's Orthodox Church, Adoor
- Mar Ignatious Orthodox Church, Adoor
- MarthSmooni Orthodox Church, Adoor
- St. Thomas Orthodox Church, Kannamkode
- St. Mary's Orthodox Church, Anandappally
- St. George Orthodox Church, Anandappally
- St. Kuriakos Orthodox Church, Anandappally
- St. Mary's Orthodox Church, Aykadu
- MarthSmooni Orthodox valiyapalli, Peringanadu
- St. Gregorios Orthodox Church, Peringanadu
- St. Gregorios Orthodox Church, Pazhakulam
- St. George Orthodox Church, Paranthal
- St. Mary's Orthodox Church, Karuvatta
- MarthSmooni Orthodox Church, Kottanellur
- St. George Orthodox Church, Nooranad .

=== Parakkod ===
- St. Mary's Orthodox Church, Thoduvakkad
- St. Mary's Orthodox Church, Nedumon
- St. George Orthodox Church, Chayalode
- St. Mary's Orthodox Church, Ezhamkulam
- St. Gregorios Orthodox Church, Ezhamkulam
- St. Mary's Orthodox Church, Mangad
- Mar Aprem Orthodox Church, Parakkod
- Mar Pathros Poulos Orthodox Church, Parakkod
- St. George Orthodox Church, Mamkoottam

.

=== Enathu ===
- St. Kuriakos Orthodox Church, Enathu
- St. Mary's Orthodox Church, Puthusseribhagam
- St. George Orthodox Syrian Church, Kaithaparambu
- St. Mary's Orthodox Church, Thazhethuvadakku
- St. George Orthodox Church, Arattupuzha
- Mar Kauma Sahada Orthodox Church, Kizhakkupuram
- MarthSmooni Orthodox Church, Thempara .

=== Kadampanadu ===
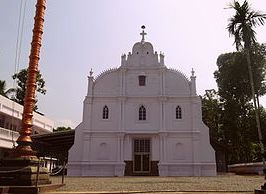
St.Thomas Orthodox Cathedral, Kadampanad

- St. Thomas Orthodox Cathedral, Kadampanadu
- St. John's Orthodox Church, Thuvayur
- St. George Orthodox Church, Elampallickal
- St. Mary's Orthodox Church, Thengamam
- St. Mary's Orthodox Church, Kadampanadu Vadakku .

=== Pathanapuram ===
- St. Mary's Orthodox Church, Punnala
- Mar Lazarus Orthodox Church, Pathanapuram
- St. Mary's Orthodox Church, Vazhathope
- Salem St. Mary's Orthodox Church, Pidavoor
- St. Gregorios Orthodox Church, Enchapara
- St. George Orthodox Church, Kalanjoor
- St. Paul's Orthodox Church, Koodal
- St. Mary's Orthodox Church, Koodal
- Hermon Orthodox Church, Makkulam
- St. George Orthodox Church, Kadakkamon
- St. Thomas Orthodox Church, Elamannoor
- St. Mary's Orthodox Church, Maroor
- Mar Gregorios Orthodox Church, Maloor
- St. Mary's Orthodox Church, Chelikkuzhi .

== Chapels ==
=== Adoor ===
- St.Jude, Thapovan
- St. Gregorios, Pannivizha
- St. Mary's, Peringanad
- Mar Baselios, Kottumukal .

=== Parakkod ===
- Mar Laserus, Maruthimood .

=== Kadampanadu ===
- Mar Gregorios, Nellimukal
- St. Jude, Ezhammile .

=== Pathanapuram ===
- St. Gregorios, Edathara
- St. Gregorios, Salempuram
- St. George, Kurangayam
- St. Mary's, Nedumankavu
- St. Stephen's (Mount Tabor Dayara), Pathanapuram
- St. Gregorios, Makkulam

== See also ==
- Saint Thomas
- Paulose II
- Mathews II
