= Yuhanon Thevodoros =

Yuhanon Mar Thevodors
- Church: Malankara Orthodox Syrian Church
- Diocese: Kottarakkara Punalur Diocese
- In office: 2010–present

Orders
- Ordination: 12 May 2010 by HH Baselios Mar Thoma Didymos I

Personal details
- Born: 10 February 1953 (age 73) Mavelikara, Kerala

H.G. Dr Yuhanon Mar Thevodors is the metropolitan of Kottarakkara Punalur Diocese of the Malankara Orthodox Syrian Church.
