= Thomas Ivanios =

Oriental Orthodox bishop

Thomas Mar Ivanios
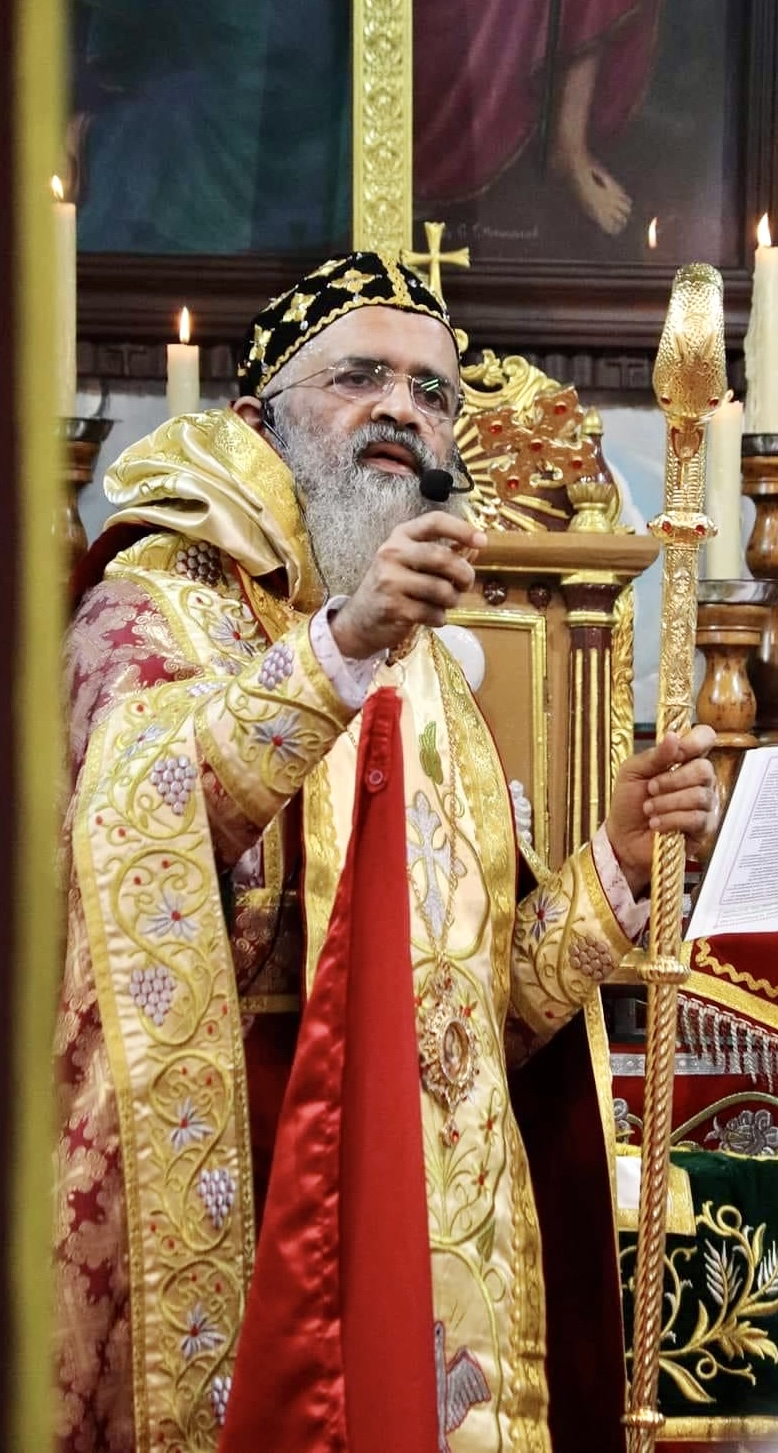
- Church: Malankara Orthodox Syrian Church
- Diocese: Malankara Orthodox Diocese of Southwest America
- In office: 2022–present
- Predecessor: Zacharias Aprem

Orders
- Ordination: 28 July 2022 by Baselios Marthoma Mathews III

Personal details
- Born: 13 December 1969 (age 55)

Thomas Ivanios is a Metropolitan of the Malankara Orthodox Syrian Church.

== Early life ==
Ivanios was born on 13 December 1969.

== Metropolitan ==
He was elected as the Metropolitan candidate on 25 February 2022 at the Malankara Association held at Kolenchery. He was consecrated as Metropolitan on 28 July 2022 at St. Mary's Orthodox Cathedral, Pazhanji.
