= Gabriel Gregorios =

Indian bishop (born 1948)

Gabriel Mar Gregorios
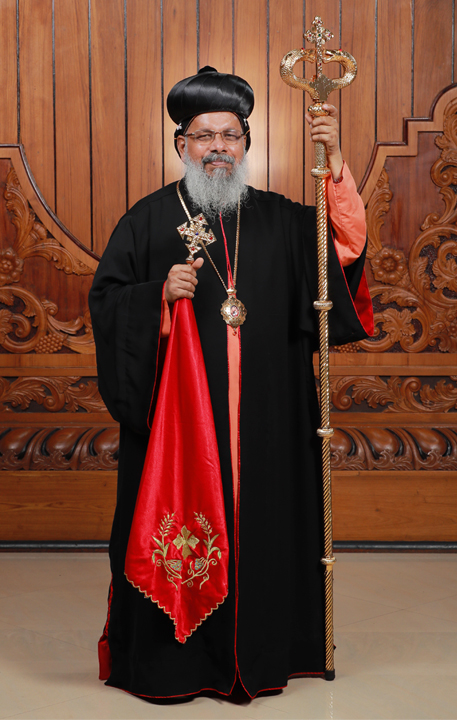
- Gabriel Mar Gregorios
- Church: Malankara Orthodox Syrian Church
- Diocese: Thiruvananthapuram Diocese
- In office: 2005 – Present

Orders
- Ordination: 5 March 2005

Personal details
- Born: 10 February 1948 (age 77) Vadakethazhethil, Kanjickal

Gabriel Mar Gregorios (born 10 February 1948) is Metropolitan of the Diocese of Thiruvananthapuram of the Indian (Malankara) Orthodox Church.
