= Malankara Orthodox Diocese of Northeast America =

Ecclesiastical territory of the Malankara Orthodox Syrian Church

Coordinates: 40°48′40″N 73°32′10″W

Diocese of Northeast America

Orthodox
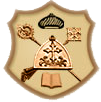
- Catholicate Emblem

Location
- Country: United States
- Territory: America
- Metropolitan: H. G. Zachariah Mar Nicholovos
- Headquarters: Indian Orthodox Church Centre, 2158 route 106, mutton Town, New York-11791

Information
- First holder: L. L. H. G. Thomas Mar Makarios
- Rite: Malankara Rite
- Established: 1975
- Diocese: Northeast America Diocese
- Parent church: Malankara Orthodox Syrian Church

Website
- Northeast America Diocese

The Diocese of Northeast America is an ecclesiastical territory or diocese of the Malankara Orthodox Syrian Church. The diocese has jurisdiction over eastern parts of the United States. The diocese is headquartered at Muttontown, New York.

== History ==
The diocese of Northeast America came into existence in 2009 by dividing the then existed American Diocese.

=== Timeline ===
- 1970's Many parishes and congregations of the Malankara Orthodox Syrian Church were started in America.
- 1976 The parishes in America were placed under the authority of Bombay Diocese.
- 1979 A new diocese for America is formed and L. L. H.G. Dr. Thomas Mar Makarios was appointed as the first metropolitan of the diocese.
- 1991 The Malankara Metropolitan was the ruling hierarch of the American Diocese with L. L. H. G.Mathews Mar Barnabas as Auxiliary.
- 1993 Mathews Mar Barnabas enthroned as the metropolitan of the diocese.
- 2002 Zachariah Mar Nicholovos appointed as Auxiliary Metropolitan to Mathews Mar Barnabas.
- 2009 The Diocese of America divided into Malankara Orthodox Diocese of Northeast America and Malankara Orthodox Diocese of Southwest America. Mathews Mar Barnabas and Zachariah Mar Nicholovos continued in the diocese of Northeast America.
- 2011 Mathews Mar Barnabas retired and Zachariah Mar Nicholovos enthroned as the metropolitan of the diocese.

== Diocesan Metropolitan ==
List of Diocesan Metropolitan
From	Until	Metropolitan	Notes
1979	1991	Thomas Mar Makarios	First Metropolitan of American Diocese
1993	2011	Mathews Mar Barnabas	Retired on January 18, 2011. Died on December 9, 2012.
2011	Present	Zachariah Mar Nicholovos	Enthroned as Diocesan Metropolitan on May 21, 2011.

== List of parishes ==
- St. Mary's Orthodox Church, Bronx, New York
- St. Gregorios Orthodox Church, Queens, New York
- St. Stephen's Orthodox Church, Long Island, New York
- St. Mary's Indian Orthodox Church of Rockland, Suffern, New York
- St. Paul's Indian Orthodox Church, Albany, New York
- St. Baselios Orthodox Church, Elmont, New York
- St. Gregorios Malankara Orthodox Church, Floral Park, New York
- St. Basil Orthodox Church, Franklin Square, New York
- St. Gregorios Orthodox Church, Yonkers, New York
- St. George Orthodox Church Of Westchester, New York
- St. Thomas Orthodox Church, Syracuse, New York
- St. George Malankara Orthodox Church Fairless Hills, Pennsylvania (PA)
- St. Mary's Malankara Orthodox Syrian Cathredral, Philadelphia, Pennsylvania
- St. Gregorios Malankara Orthodox Church, Philadelphia, Pennsylvania
- St. Thomas Indian Orthodox Church, Philadelphia, Pennsylvania
- St. Mary's Orthodox Church, Devereaux Avenue, Philadelphia, Pennsylvania
- St. John The Baptist Indian Orthodox Church Of Delaware Valley, Drexel Hill, Pennsylvania
- St. Gregorios Indian Orthodox Church Of Dutchess Country, New York
- St. Peter's & St. Paul's Indian Orthodox Church, Tappan, New York
- St. George Malankara Orthodox Church Of India, Staten Island, New York
- Mar Gregorios Orthodox Church, Staten Island, New York
- St. Mary's Orthodox Church, Staten Island, New York
- St. Thomas Malankara Orthodox Church, Philadelphia, Pennsylvania
- St. Mary's Indian Orthodox Church, West Sayville, New York
- St. Thomas Indian Orthodox Church, Yonkers, New York
- St. Gregorios Indian Orthodox Church, Parkhill Avenue, Yonkers, New York
- St. Mary's Orthodox Church, Woodside, New York
- St. Thomas Diocesan Chapel, Syosset, New York
- St. Thomas Orthodox Church, Rochester, New York
- St. Baselios Orthodox Church, Ridgewood, New York
- St. John's Malankara Orthodox Church, Orangeburg, New York
- St. Mary's Orthodox Church, Jackson Heights, New York
- St. Thomas Orthodox Church, Long Island, New York
- St. Mary's Indian Orthodox Church, Valley Cottage, New York
- St. Thomas Indian Orthodox Church, Mt. Olive, New Jersey
- Sts. Baselios - Gregorios Orthodox Church, North Plainfield, New Jersey
- St. Stephen's Orthodox Church, Midland Park, New Jersey
- St. Gregorios Indian Orthodox Church, Clifton, New Jersey
- St. Mary's Orthodox Church of Linden, New Jersey
- St. Thomas Indian Orthodox Church, Baltimore, Maryland
- St. Mary's Indian Orthodox Church of Boston, Maynard, Massachusetts
- St. Thomas Orthodox Syrian Church, Damascus, Maryland
- St. Gregorios Indian Orthodox Church, Silver Spring, Maryland
- St. Thomas Indian Orthodox Church, Hartford, Connecticut
- St. Mary's Indian Orthodox Church, Clifton, Virginia
- St. Thomas Indian Orthodox Church, Greater Washington, Maryland
- St. Andrew Malankara Orthodox Congregation, Glenwood Landing, New York
- St. Thekla Malankara Orthodox Congregation Hudson Valley, New York
- St. John Malankara Orthodox Church Bellerose, New York
- St. Luke Malankara Orthodox Congregation Philadelphia, Pennsylvania
- St. Barnabas Malankara Orthodox Congregation Washington D.C., Maryland
- St. Gregorios Malankara Orthodox Church Raleigh, North Carolina
- St. George Malankara Orthodox Congregation Richmond, Virginia
