= Kandanad West Orthodox Diocese =

Diocese of the Malankara Orthodox Syrian Church

Diocese of Kandanad West

Orthodox
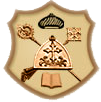
- Catholicate Emblem

Location
- Country: India
- Territory: Kandanad
- Metropolitan: Baselios Marthoma Mathews III; Zachariah Mar Severios (Asst.)
- Headquarters: Prasadam Centre, Kolencherrym Ernakulam- 682 311

Information
- First holder: Mathews Mar Severios
- Rite: Malankara Rite
- Established: 20 March 2002
- Diocese: Kandanad West Diocese
- Parent church: Malankara Orthodox Syrian Church

Website
- Kandanad West Diocese

Kandanad West Diocese is one of the 32 dioceses of Malankara Orthodox Syrian Church.

== History ==
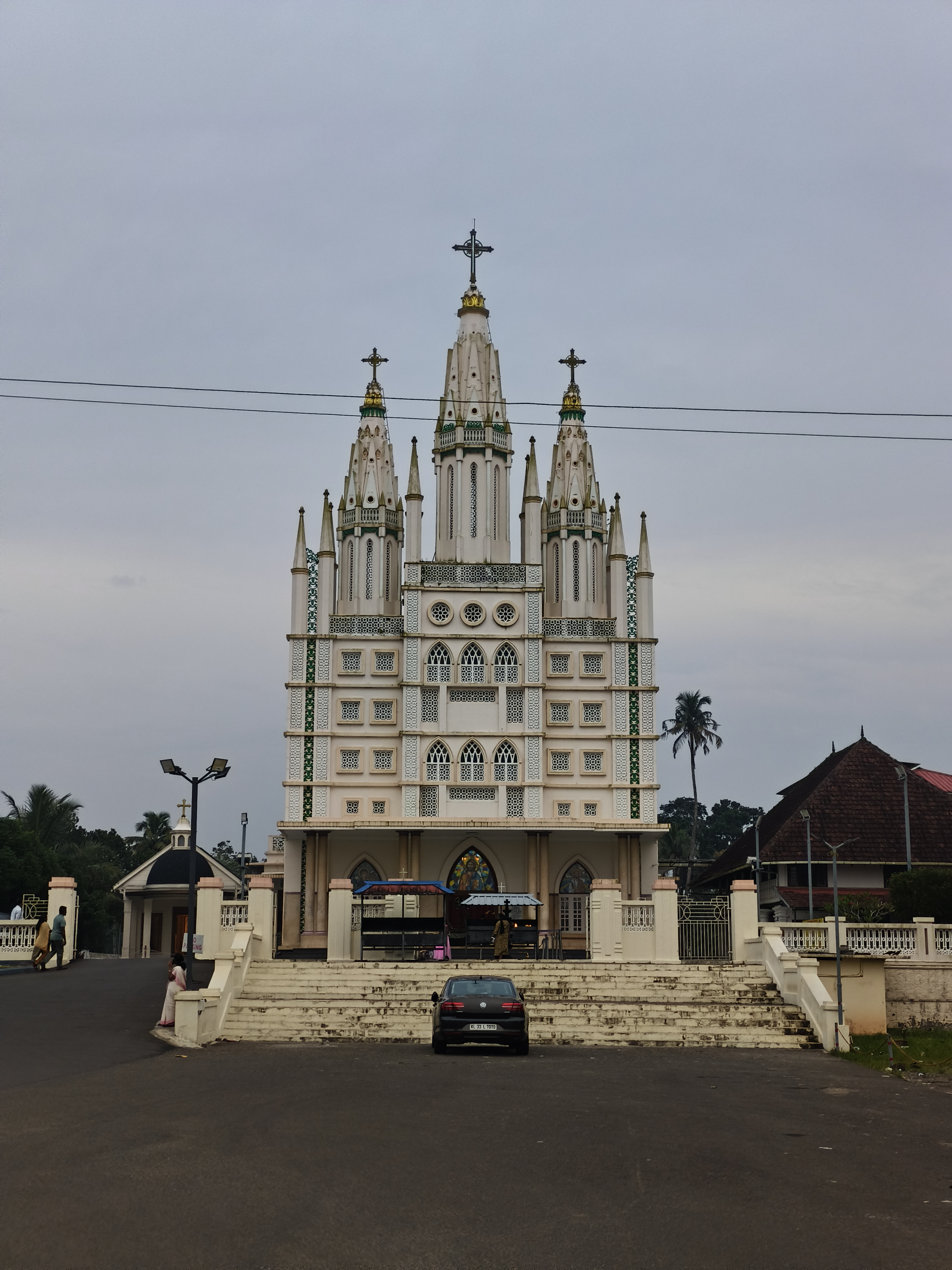
St. Peter and St. Paul's Church, Kolenchery

In 1876 Malankara Orthodox Church was divided as 7 Dioceses by Mulanthuruthy Synod. Among that seven, one diocese was Kandanad Diocese, at that time the parishes of Kandanad Diocese were spread across Kottayam, Idukki and Ernakulam District. The first Metropolitan of this diocese was Paulose mar Ivanios (murimattathil bava), who later became First Catholicos of Malankara Orthodox Church, and belongs to Kolenchery St. Peter's and St. Paul's orthodox church.

Followed by him this diocese was governed by the following Metropolitans.

- Yuyakim Mar Ivanios
- Augen Mar Thimothios
- Paulose Mar Philoxenos
- Joseph Mar Pachomiose

From 1991 this diocese is under the auspicious leadership of Mathews Mar Severios. In 2002 this Diocese divided into Two Kandanad (E) and Kandanad (W).

== Today ==
Today including parish churches and catholicate centers there are 41 worship centers in this diocese. There are 40 priests including corepiscopas offering their dedicated services in this Diocese. The diocesan headquarters is now situated at Prasadam centre, kolenchery. All spiritual organisations are very active in this diocese. Besides the spiritual activities, several charitable activities are also functioning under this diocese by the leadership of Mathews Mar Severios. The charitable institutions are organized and administered by Mar Pachomios charitable society and Pratheebha charitable trust.

== Diocesan metropolitan ==
Kandanad Diocesan Metropolitan
From	Until	Metropolitan	Notes
17-May-1877	02-May-1913	Paulose Mar Ivanios (Later Baselios Paulose I)	1st Metropolitan of the diocese
1913	1925	Yuyakim Mar Ivanios	2nd Metropolitan of the diocese
1925	1934	Geevarghese Mar Dionysius of Vattasseril (Dionysius VI)	3rd Metropolitan of the diocese, Ruled as Malankara Metropolitan
1934	1942	Baselius Geevarghese II Catholicos	4th Metropolitan of the diocese, Ruled as Malankara Metropolitan
Oct-1942	22-May-1964	Augen Mar Thimothios (Later Baselios Augen I)	5th Metropolitan of the diocese
22-May-1964	1970	Paulose Mar Philoxenos (Later Baselios Paulose II)	6th Metropolitan of the diocese
1970	16-Feb-1975	Baselios Augen I Catholicos	7th Metropolitan of the diocese, Ruled as Malankara Metropolitan
16-Feb-1975	19-Aug-1991	Joseph Mar Pachomiose	8th Metropolitan of the diocese
19-Aug-1991	1993	Baselios Marthoma Mathews II Catholicos	9th Metropolitan of the diocese, Ruled as Malankara Metropolitan
1993	20-Mar-2002	Mathews Mar Severios (Later Baselios Marthoma Mathews III)	10th Metropolitan of the diocese

Kandanad West Orthodox Diocesan Metropolitan
From	Until	Metropolitan	Notes
20-Mar-2002	Incumbent	Mathews Mar Severios (Later Baselios Marthoma Mathews III)	1st Metropolitan of the diocese, Ruled as Malankara Metropolitan

Assistant Metropolitan
From	Until	Metropolitan	Notes
15-Jul-2024	Incumbent	Zachariah Mar Severios	Assistant metropolitan

== Social welfare projects ==
The Kandanad West Diocese has initiated several charitable projects.

=== Pratheeksha Bhavan ===
Located at Karimpana, Koothattukulam, Pratheekha Bhavan (The House of Hope) is the rehabilitation home for 50 orphan women who are mentally and physically challenged.

=== Prasanthi Bhavan ===
Prasanthi Bhavan (The House of Comfort) is designed to provide comfort to terminally ill patients who have no place to go. Situated at Kadayiruppu, this institution aims at providing service facilities for eighty poor patients who need long-term treatment and protection.

=== Prathyasa Bhavan ===
Prathyasa Bhavn (The House of Expectation) taking care of 50 orphan boys who are mentally and physically challenged. Prathyasa Bhavan is located at South Piramadaom, Pampakkuda.

=== Prathibha Bhavan ===
Prathibha Bhavan is a job orientation centre for unemployed located at Kunnackal, Muvattupuzha. The project aims at training unemployed youths for self-employment through various small scale industries. Income from the sale of products are utilised for the expenses of charitable projects of the diocese. Products of the project are Prathibha Curry Powder, Prathibha Garments, Prathibha Candles, Prathibha Umbrellas and Prathibha Soaps.

=== Pradhanam ===
Helping poor patients by donating medicines.

=== Promodam ===
Promodam (Make people Happy) is a free food service which aims at distributing daily free lunch to inpatients in 11 government hospitals at Piravam, Muvattupuzha, Koothattukulam, Vadavucode, Kadayiruppu, Valakam, Ramamanagalam, Pampakkuda, Thodupuzha, Mulanthuruthy and Pandappilly.

== Parishes ==
- St.Marys Orthodox Church, Attinkunnu
- St.Thomas Orthodox Church, Nechoor
- St. Marys Orthodox valiyapally, Onakkoor
- St. George Orthodox Church, Edamaruku
- St. George Orthodox Church, Kadamattom
- St. Mary's Orthodox Church, Kandanad
- St. George Orthodox Church, Kizhumuri
- St. Peter's and St. Paul's Orthodox Church, Kolenchery
- St. George Orthodox Church, Kottor
- St Peter's and St Paul's Parel Orthodox Church, Mulakkulam
- St. George Orthodox Church, Kunnackal West
- St. George Sehion Orthodox Church, Kunnackal East
- Mar Augen Orthodox Church, Maravanthuruthu
- St. George Orthodox Church, Moolamattom
- St. George Orthodox Church, Karmelkkunnu
- St. Mary's Orthodox Cathedral, Mulakulam
- St.Marys Orthodox Church, Muttom
- St. John's Orthodox Valiya Pally, Pampakkuda
- St. Thomas Orthodox Cheriya Pally, Pampakkuda
- St. George Orthodox Church, Perumbadavom
- St. John's Orthodox Church, Peruva***
- St. Mary's Orthodox Church, Peruva
- Mar Yoohanon Ihidoyo Orthodox Valiyapalli Mulakkulam
- Mar Bahanan Orthodox Syrian Church, Thevanal, Vettickal, Mulanthuruthy
- St.Marys Orthodox Church, Ooramana
- St.John's Orthodox Church, Puthuvely
- St.Peters and St.Paul Orthodox Church, Puthencruez
- St.Marys Orthodox Church, Valamboor
- St.Thomas Orthodox Church, Valamboor North***
- St.Thomas Orthodox Dayara Church, Vettickal

== See also ==
- Malankara Orthodox Syrian Church
- Baselios Mar Thoma Paulose II
- Marth Mariam Cathedral Kandanad (Kizhakkinde Yerushulem)
