= St. Mary's Orthodox Syrian Cathedral, Kandanad =

Cathedral in Kerala, India

Coordinates: 9°54′52″N 76°22′21″E

St Mary's Orthodox Cathedral, Kandanad
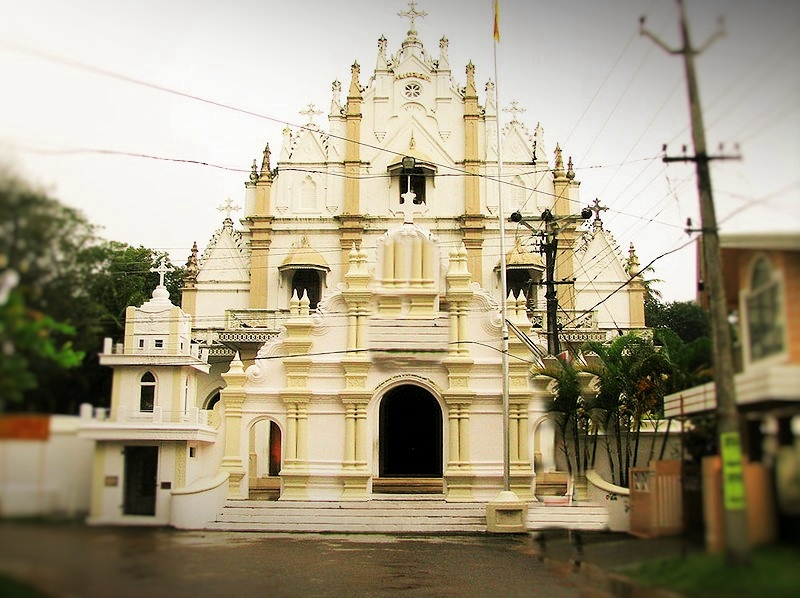
- St Mary's Orthodox Cathedral, Kandanad

Religion
- Affiliation: Malankara Orthodox Syrian Church
- District: Ernakulam
- Province: Kerala
- Ecclesiastical or organisational status: Cathedral
- Year consecrated: 4th century AD

Location
- Location: Kandanad, Ernakulam, India
- Interactive map of St Mary's Orthodox Cathedral, Kandanad

Architecture
- Type: Church
- Style: Ancient Architecture
- Direction of façade: West

Website
- http://www.mosc.in

Kandanad Valiyapally St. Mary's Orthodox Cathedral, Kandanad is a cathedral in the Kandanad village of Ernakulam District of Kerala. Believed to have been originally constructed circa 4th century AD, it has been administered by Diocese of Kandanad West of the Malankara Orthodox Syrian Church. From 1876 it was under Kandanad Diocese, the Malankara Orthodox Syrian Church administered the cathedral.

Kandanad was an important port city in the 14th century. Jewish Christians from Kodungallur settled here to export spices through the large trading area known as Kandanad Angadi. More than 400 families lived near the Kandanad Orthodox Cathedral and took part in the trade. Shops lined the riverbank, with many more located just behind them. In the 16th century Kandanad became part of the Travancore dynasty, and the church remained a prominent force in managing local trade. The first Malayalam Bible translation was completed at this church under the leadership of Kayamkulam Philipose Ramban and Pulikkottil Ramban. It took three years to translate the four Gospels into Malayalam. Kandanad Church was also renowned for the "Kandanad Padiyola" and served as the seat for the primates H.G. Marthoma I through Marthoma IX; Marthoma IV is entombed there. The church initiated formal schooling in 1806, following the decision of the First Kandanad Synod of the Malankara Church. Today the church belongs to the Malankara Orthodox Syrian Church, Kandanad West Diocese. It falls under the spiritual authority of H.H. Moran Mor Baselios Marthoma Mathews III, with administrative support from H.G. Zachariah Mar Severios.

== History ==
The church edifice was completed in 1910. An inscription on the wall says that the church was consecrated in the 4th century.

== See also ==
Marth Mariam Cathedral Kandanad (Kizhakkinde Yerushulem)
