= Marth Mariam Cathedral, Kandanad =

Church in Kerala, India

Marth Mariam Cathedral Kandanad is a Christian church in the Ernakulam district of Kerala, India. It is the Cathedral Church of the Malankara orthodox Syrian Church in Kandanad West Orthodox Diocese and is also known as The Yerushulem of East (Kizhakkinde Yerushulem).

The present structure of the Church has five stages in its formation. It may well suit to compare its constructions with the different stages of the construction of Yerushulem Church in Old Testament. It may be the reason because this church is also christened as Kizhakkinde Yerushulem of Malankara. Though there are scant documents available about its beginning, there are decrypts written in stones mentioned about its second stage of development is available. The decrypts from the granite cross which was there in front of the church gives information about this second stage of construction. It is mentioned in one of the stone that the corner stone of this new church is laid on 1672 Kumbam 25 (Malayalam calendar month).

== History ==
Before the existing construction, the Church was located at “PalliMala” east to the present location. This place is still known as “PalliMala”. Referring the documents of Portuguese the name of this church is mentioned as “Cheriya Uthiyanperoor Church”. From those documents, it is estimated that, this Church was established on A.D 775. Before A.D 775, the present location of Kandanad was called as the east gate of the famous and older trade center Uthiyanperoor port. In order to understand deeply, who and why a Church was established here at A.D 775; an overview of the political situation of south Asia needs to be researched.

Baselios Sakralla III of Aleppo was buried at the church in 1764.

== See also ==
St. Mary's Orthodox Syrian Cathedral, Kandanad
