= Zacharias Aprem =

Indian bishop

- Church: Malankara Orthodox Syrian Church
- Diocese: Adoor-Kadampanad Diocese
- In office: 2010–present

Orders
- Ordination: 12 May 2010 by Baselios Thoma Didymos I

Personal details
- Born: 11 March 1966 (age 59) Chungathara, Kerala

Zacharias Aprem (born 11 March 1966) is the Metropolitan of the Adoor-Kadampanad Diocese and served as the assistant metropolitan of the Southwest American Diocese from 20 September 2017 to 3 November 2022.

He was relieved from his administrative duties and responsibilities on 23 May 2025 by the Holy Episcopal Synod of the Malankara Orthodox Syrian Church following controversial remarks about the Church's Constitution. On 4 August 2025, after accepting a petition submitted by him, the Episcopal Synod reinstated all his previous duties and responsibilities.

== Metropolitan ==
In February 2010, the Malankara Syrian Christian Association met at Shasthamkotta and elected Zacharias along with six others to become bishops. Zacharias orchestrated the move. The Malankara Metropolitan and Catholicos of the East Baselios Thoma Didymos I, received Zacharias's profession as Ramban-priest on 21 March 2010. Zacharias was ordained to the episcopate by Didymos I on 12 May 2010 at Mar Elia Cathedral, Kottayam. On 17 September 2017, Zacharias was appointed as Assistant Metropolitan of the Malankara Orthodox Diocese of Southwest America.
