= Alexios Eusebios =

Oriental Orthodox bishop

H. G Alexios Mar Eusebius
- Church: Malankara Orthodox Syrian Church
- Diocese: Calcutta Diocese
- In office: 2009 – Present

Orders
- Ordination: 19 Feb 2009

Personal details
- Born: 25 May 1964 (age 61) Puthoor

H.G Alexios Mar Eusebius is the Metropolitan bishop of Calcutta Diocese of Malankara Orthodox Syrian Church.
