= Thiruvananthapuram Orthodox Diocese =

Diocese of the Malankara Orthodox Syrian Church in India

Diocese of Thiruvananthapuram

Orthodox
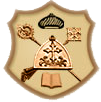
- Catholicate Emblem

Location
- Country: India
- Territory: Thiruvananthapuram and Kanyakumari
- Metropolitan: Baselios Marthoma Mathews III
- Headquarters: Orthodox Church Centre, Ulloor, Medical College P.O., Thiruvananthapuram - 695 011
- Coordinates: 8°31′36″N 76°55′42″E

Information
- First holder: H.G. Geevarghese Mar Dioscorus
- Rite: Malankara Rite
- Established: 01 January 1979
- Diocese: Thiruvananthapuram Diocese
- Parent church: Malankara Orthodox Syrian Church

Website
- Thiruvananthapuram Diocese

Thiruvananthapuram Orthodox Diocese is one of the 32 dioceses of Malankara Orthodox Syrian Church.

== History ==
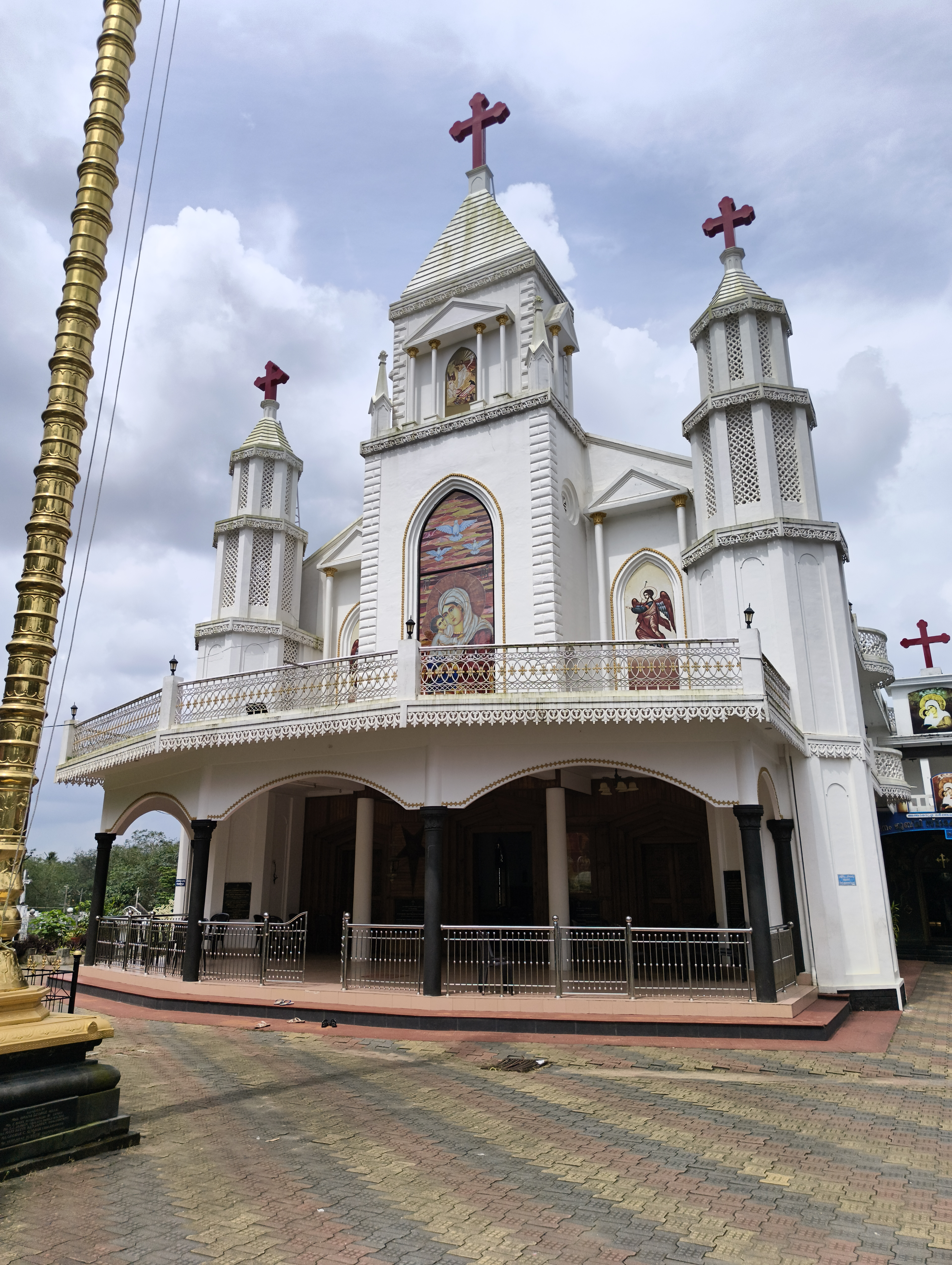
Alencherry St. Mary's church

On 20 February 1978, the Malankara Syrian Christian managing committee recommended a division in Kollam diocese. According to Committee’s recommendation, Thiruvananthapuram Diocese was formed on 1 January 1979, after the division of Kollam Diocese. At the time of formation 94 parishes were under the diocese. From 1986 onwards, the orthodox Center at Ulloor has served as the bishop house.

== Today ==
In 2010, a new diocese in the name of Kottarakkara Punalur Diocese was created after dividing the Thiruvananthapuram Diocese. There are 51 parishes in the diocese after the division.

== Charitable and educational activities ==
The Charitable and Educational Society of the Thiruvananthapuram Orthodox Diocese is a registered society established in 1991 for starting and managing institutions of higher education in Thiruvananthapuram. The Society is sponsored by Thiruvananthapuram Diocese of Malankara Orthodox Church. Geevarghese Mar Dioscoros was the founder President of the Society. Baselios Mar Thoma Paulose II, the Catholicose of the East, is the patron of the Society. The metropolitan of the Thiruvananthapuram Orthodox Diocese, Gabriel Mar Gregorios, was the president of the Society as of 2013. The society runs Mar Dioscorus College of Pharmacy (MDCP), Sreekariyam.

== Diocesan Metropolitans ==
Thiruvananthapuram Orthodox Diocesan Metropolitan
From	Until	Metropolitan	Notes
1979	1981	Baselios Marthoma Mathews I Catholicos	1st Metropolitan of the diocese, Ruled as Malankara Metropolitan
1981	1999	Geevarghese Mar Diascoros	2nd Metropolitan of the diocese
1999	2004	Mathews Mar Epiphanios	3rd Metropolitan of the diocese
2005	Present	Dr. Gabriel Mar Gregorios	4th Metropolitan of the diocese

Assistant Metropolitan
From	Until	Metropolitan	Notes
1979	1981	Geevarghese Mar Diascoros	Assistant metropolitan

== List of Parishes ==
=== Cathedral ===
- St. George Orthodox Syrian Cathedral, Thiruvananthapuram

=== Parishes ===
- St. George Orthodox Syrian Cathedral, Palayam
- St. Bahanans Orthodox Church, Adichanalloor
- St. George Orthodox Church, Aduthala
- St. John's Orthodox Church, Aduthala
- St. Gregorios Orthodox Church, Alampara
- St. Mary’s Orthodox Church, Alamcherry
- St. George Orthodox Church, Anchel
- St. George Orthodox Church, Attingal
- St. Mary's Orthodox Church, Ayoor
- St. Mary's Orthodox Church, Channapetta
- St. George Orthodox Church, Chathannoor
- St. George Orthodox Church, Chengulam
- St. George Orthodox Church, Cheruvakkal
- St. Mary’s Orthodox Church, Chozhiyacode
- St. Thomas Orthodox Church, Elamadu
- St. Mary's Orthodox Church, Ezhamkulam
- St. Thomas Orthodox Church, Kampamcode
- Mar Bersowma Orthodox Church, Kattachel
- St. Mary's and St Jude Orthodox Church, Kazhakootam
- St. Thomas Orthodox Church, Kumarapuram
- St. Thomas Orthodox Church, Kulasekharam
- St. George Orthodox Church, Kulathupuzha
- Mar Aprem Orthodox Church, Kowdiar
- St. George Orthodox Church, Makkulam
- St. George Orthodox Church, Malaperoor
- Mar Gregorios Orthodox Church, Malayinkeezhu
- Marthesmooni Orthodox Church, Mannoor
- St. Mary's Orthodox Church, Mannoor
- Mar Elia Orthodox Church, Meenkulam
- St. George Orthodox Church, Meeyannoor
- St. George Orthodox Church, Nagarcovil
- St. Mary's Orthodox Church, Nalanchira
- St. Gregorios Orthodox Church, Nanthankode
- St. Thomas Orthodox Church, Neeraikode
- St. George Mission Orthodox Church, Palavila
- Thekkan Parumala St. Gregorios Orthodox Valiya Pally, Peroorkada
- St. Dionysius Orthodox Church, Perukavu
- St. Peter's & St. Paul's Orthodox Church, Pooyapally
- Mar Baselios Mar Gregorios Orthodox Church, Sreekaryam
- St. Thomas Orthodox Church, Thazhamel (Anchel)
- St. George Orthodox Church, Thirumangalam
- St. Kuriakose Orthodox Church, Thumpode
- St. Thomas Orthodox Church, Vadakkamkulam
- St. George Orthodox Church, Varinjam
- St. George Orthodox Church, Varinjavila
- St. Peter's & St. Paul's Orthodox Church, Vattiyoorkavu
- St. Mary's Orthodox Church, Velimala
- St. George Orthodox Church, Vithura
- St. Mary's Orthodox Church, Thiruvithamcode
- St.Thomas Orthodox Syrian Church Chittazha

== See also ==
- Malankara Orthodox Syrian Church
- Baselios Marthoma Paulose II
