= Stephanos Theodosius =

Indian metropolitan bishop (1924–2007)

Stephanos Mar Theodosius (1924–2007) was the bishop of the Calcutta diocese of the Malankara Orthodox Church.

He was born K.K Punnoose on 2 October 1924 in Pathamuttam, Vakathanam. He was ordained as Deacon on 25 April 1946 at Sleeba Church, Pathamuttam. by Geevarghese, the 2nd Catholicos and as priest in 1947 On 2 October 1974 he was elected as a bishop of the Malankara Orthodox Church. He was ordained as Ramban on 15 February 1975 at St. Mary's Orthodox Church Puthenkavu and in 16 February as a Bishop at Niranam Valiyapally.

In the 1960s he studied in the United States, receiving a BD from the General Theological Seminary, New York 1966, and a ST< from Berkeley Divinity School at Yale University in 1967. The General Theological Seminary awarded him an honorary D.D. in 1990.

He was the first bishop of Madras Diocese in 1975 and became the first Bishop of Calcutta diocese in 1979.

He was the director of St Thomas Orthodox Church Mission one of the prior mission outside Kerala. He also had established schools and colleges.

He died on 5 November 2007 at Muscat and was buried in St Thomas Ashram Chapel, Bhilai.
