= Angamaly Malankara Orthodox Diocese =

Diocese of the Malankara Orthodox Syrian Church in India

Diocese of Angamaly

Orthodox
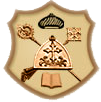
- Catholicate Emblem

Location
- Country: India
- Territory: Angamaly
- Metropolitan: H. G. Yuhanon Mar Policarpos
- Headquarters: Thrikkunath Seminary, PB-61, Aluva- 683 101

Statistics
- Population: Total: 50,000
- Parishes: 44

Information
- First holder: Ambattu Geevarghese Mor Kurillos
- Rite: Malankara Rite
- Established: 1876, by Ignatius Peter IV
- Diocese: Angamaly Diocese
- Parent church: Malankara Orthodox Syrian Church

Website
- Angamaly Diocese

Angamaly Diocese is one of the ancient dioceses of Malankara Orthodox Church in Kerala, India. Angamaly Diocese is one of the 32 dioceses of the Malankara Orthodox Syrian Church having its see at Kottayam, and covering a wide area including big portions of Ernakulam and Idukki Districts. The Diocese was formed in the historic synod of Mulanthuruthy in 1876.

== Diocesan Metropolitans ==
In 2023, the diocesan head was Metropolitan Yuhanon Mar Policarpos who took charge in February 2009.

Former Metropolitans

- Kadavil Paulose Mar Athanasiose
- Pilikottil Joseph Mar Dionysius
- Paulose Mar Athanasios|Geevarghese Mar Gregorios
- 1967–1974 Philipose Mar Theophilose
- 1978–1982 Mathews Mar Barnabas
- 2009–Yuhanon Mar Policarpus

== Parishes ==
1. Angamaly Mar Gregorios Orthodox Church
2. Angamaly St Mary's Orthodox Church (Ist marthoma tomb)***
3. Adimali St Thomas
4. Aluva Thrikunnathu Seminary Church
5. Aluva College Hill St. Thomas Church
6. Ayamkara St George
7. Chathamattom Shalom Orthodox Church
8. Chathamattom St.Peters and St.Pauls Orthodox Church
9. Eloor Mar Gregorios Orthodox Church
10. Erattiyanikunnu St George Orthodox Church
11. Josegiri St Mary's Orthodox Church
12. Kalamassery St George Orthodox Church
13. Kakkanadu St Thomas
14. Kottapady St George
15. Kavalangadu St John's
16. Kambilikandam St Mary's
17. Kothamangalam Marthoma Church
18. Keezhillom Udayagiri Mar Gregorios
19. Kodanadu Mar Malke
20. Kodanadu Sehion
21. Kunnakurudy St. George Cathedral
22. Kothamangalam Mar Baselious
23. Kurupampady St.Mary's Orthodox Syrian Church
24. Kutta St George
25. Kulaparachal Bethlehem St. Mary's
26. Kizhakambalam St Marys Orthodox church (Kizhakambalam Dayara)
27. Kizhakambalam St Peter's and St Paul's
28. Mudavoor St George Orthodox church
29. East Marady St Gregorios Orthodox church
30. Mulavoor Kyamtha
31. Mullaringad St Mary's Orthodox Church
32. Munnar St Mary's Orthodox Church
33. Mazhuvanoor St Thomas
34. Nagancheri Church
35. Odakali St Mary's Orthodox Church
36. Peechanicadu St George Orthodox church
37. Pazhamthottam St Marys Orthodox Church
38. Pallikara Mar Baselious
39. Perumbavoor Bethel Suluko Orthodox Church
40. Pukkatupady St George
41. Pothanicad St Mary's Orthodox Maha edavaka
42. Pulinthanam St John's
43. Vengoor St Thomas
44. Veetor St Mary's

== Statistics ==
- Priests: 44

== See also ==
Malankara Orthodox Syrian Church
