= Titus Yeldho =

Indian-American Syriac Orthodox prelate (born 1970)

His Eminence Mor Titus Yeldho Archbishop and Patriarchal Vicar of the Malankara Archdiocese of the Syriac Orthodox Church in North America
- Church: Syrian Orthodox Church
- Archdiocese: Malankara Archdiocese of the Syriac Orthodox Church in North America
- Other posts: 1999: Administrator of the Perumpally St. George Simhasana Church; 1995-2001: State Vice- Chairman, National Executive Board Member at YMCA

Orders
- Ordination: 05 September 1999 (Kassisso) by Ignatius Zakka I Patriarch
- Consecration: 4 January 2004 by Ignatius Zakka I Patriarch
- Rank: Archbishop

Personal details
- Born: July 22, 1970 Ernakulam
- Residence: Dayro d-Mor Ephrem Malankara Archdiocesan Headquarters, 236 Old Tappan Road, Old Tappan, New Jersey, USA
- Parents: Mr. P M Kuriakose Pathikkal & Sosamma
- Education: Msc. Mathematics from Union Christian College, Aluva, Kerala B.Ed from Mahatma Gandhi University, Kottayam; Theological Studies from Theological Seminary at Damascus; Theological Studies from M.S.O.T. Seminary, Udayagiri Master of Divinity from Saint Vladimir's Orthodox Theological Seminary
- Alma mater: Mahatma Gandhi University, Kottayam

Mor Titus Yeldho (born Aby Pathickal Kurian 22 July 1970) is an Indian-American Christian prelate, currently the Archbishop of the Malankara Archdiocese of the Syriac Orthodox Church in North America. He is the fourth archbishop of the Malankara Archdiocese in North America.

== Education ==
- Msc. Mathematics from Union Christian College, Aluva, Kerala
- B.Ed from Mahatma Gandhi University, Kottayam
- Theological Studies from Theological Seminary at Damascus
- Theological Studies from M.S.O.T. Seminary, Udayagiri
- Master of Divinity from Saint Vladimir's Orthodox Theological Seminary
