= Joseph Mar Dionysius =

Oriental Orthodox bishop

Joseph Dionysius
- Church: Malankara Orthodox Syrian Church
- Diocese: Kollam Diocese
- In office: 2022 – Present

Orders
- Ordination: 19 Feb 2009

Personal details
- Born: 15 June 1955 (age 71) Valanjavattom, Thiruvalla

Joseph Mar Dionysius is Metropolitan of Kollam Diocese of Malankara Orthodox Syrian Church. He was the Metropolitan of Calcutta Diocese from 2009 till 2022 .
