= Idukki Orthodox Diocese =

Diocese of the Malankara Orthodox Syrian Church in India

Diocese of Idukki

Orthodox
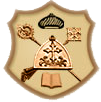
- Catholicate Emblem

Location
- Country: India
- Territory: Idukki
- Metropolitan: H. G. Zachariah Mar Severios
- Headquarters: Gedseemon Aramana, Chakkupallom, Kumily-686 509

Information
- First holder: Mathews Mar Barnabas
- Rite: Malankara Rite
- Established: 21 April 1982
- Diocese: Idukki Diocese
- Parent church: Malankara Orthodox Syrian Church

Website
- Idukki Diocese

Idukki Diocese is one of the 32 dioceses of the Malankara Orthodox Syrian Church. The diocese was formed in 1982 with the parishes in Idukki district in Kerala. The Idukki Diocesan metropolitan's bishop house is Gathsemon Aramana which is situated at Chakkupallam. Zachariah Mar Severios is the Metropolitan of Idukki Diocese.

== History ==
Idukki Diocese was formed in 1982. This diocese was formed by the partition of Kottayam Diocese in 1982. The first metropolitan of Idukki Diocese was Mathews Mar Barnabas. He bought the land at Chakkupallam and constructed the bishop's house named Gathesemon Aramana.

== Geography ==
The parishes in the diocese scattered across large geographical area. Located in the hilly forest area, the distance among the parishes are quite far from each other.

== Diocesan Metropolitans ==
Idukki Orthodox Diocesan Metropolitan
From	Until	Metropolitan	Notes
1982	1992	Mathews Mar Barnabas	1st Metropolitan of the diocese
1992	1993	Mathews Mar Severios (Later Baselios Marthoma Mathews III)	2nd Metropolitan of the diocese
1993	2002	Baselios Marthoma Mathews II Catholicos	3rd Metropolitan of the diocese, Ruled as Malankara Metropolitan
2002	2005	Abraham Mar Severios	4th Metropolitan of the diocese
01-Jul-2005	07-Jun-2007	Augen Mar Dionysios	5th Metropolitan of the diocese
2007	2009	Baselios Marthoma Didymos I Catholicos	6th Metropolitan of the diocese, Ruled as Malankara Metropolitan
2009	2019	Mathews Mar Theodosius	7th Metropolitan of the diocese
2009	12-Jul-2021	Baselios Marthoma Paulose II Catholicos	8th Metropolitan of the diocese, Ruled as Malankara Metropolitan
15-Oct-2021	03-Nov-2022	Baselios Marthoma Mathews III Catholicos	9th Metropolitan of the diocese, Ruled as Malankara Metropolitan
03-Nov-2022	Incumbent	Zachariah Mar Severios	10th Metropolitan of the diocese

Assistant Metropolitan
From	Until	Metropolitan	Notes
1994	2002	Paulose Mar Pachomios	Assistant metropolitan
2007	2009	Paulose Mar Milithios (Later Baselios Marthoma Paulose II)	Assistant metropolitan
2019	2021	Mathews Mar Severios (Later Baselios Marthoma Mathews III)	Assistant metropolitan
2021	03-Nov-2022	Joshua Mar Nicodimos	Assistant metropolitan

== List of Parishes ==
=== Cathedral ===
- St. Thomas Orthodox Cathedral, Kungiripetty

=== Other Parishes ===
- Tabor St. George Orthodox Valiyapally, Nettithozhu
- St. George Orthodox Valiyapalli, Thekkady
- St. Stephen's Orthodox Church, Alampally
- St. Thomas Orthodox Church, Anavilasam
- St. Mary's Orthodox Church, Ayyappancovil
- St. Gregorios Orthodox Church, Chellar Kovil
- Mar Gregorios Orthodox Church, Chettukuzhy
- St. Mary's Orthodox Church, Cumbumettu
- St. Mary's Orthodox Church, Elappara
- St. Thomas Orthodox Church, Helibria
- St. Thomas Orthodox Church, Kanjikuzhy
- St. George Orthodox Church, Karimpan
- Jerusalem St. Thomas Orthodox Church, Karunapuram
- St. Mary's Orthodox Church, Kattapana
- St. Mary's Orthodox Church, Kochera
- St. Mary's Orthodox Church, Mundiyeruma
- St. Mary's Orthodox Church, Nariyampara
- St. Mary's Orthodox Church, Nedumkandam
- St. George Orthodox Church, Pallikunnu
- Mar Gregorios Orthodox Church, Pampanar
- St. Thomas Orthodox Church, Peermade
- St. Mary's Orthodox Church, Puliyanmala
- St. Peter's Orthodox Church, Pullikkanam
- St. Mary's Orthodox Church, Puttady
- St. Mary's Orthodox Church, Santigram
- Mar Gregorios Orthodox Church, Thankamony
- St. George Orthodox Church, Thengakallu
- St. Mary's Orthodox Church, Uppukunnu
- St. Thomas Orthodox Church, Upputhara
- St. Mary's Orthodox Church, Valiyathovala
- St. Thomas Orthodox Church, Vandenmedu
- St. Mary's Orthodox Church, Vandiperiyar
- St. Mary's Orthodox Church, Vazhavara
- St. Diyanosyious Orthodox Church, kodukuthy
- St. Diyanosyious Orthodox Church, Pampadumpara

=== Pilgrim Centers ===
- Carmel Mar Gregoriose Pilgrim Center, Puttady
