= Ivanios Mathews =

Indian Syriac Orthodox bishop (born 1954)

His Grace Mor Ivanios Mathews Metropolitan of Kandanad Diocese
- Church: Jacobite Syrian Orthodox Church
- Diocese: Metropolitan of Kandanad Diocese
- See: Holy Apostolic See of Antioch & All East

Orders
- Ordination: 2 November 1976 (Kassisso) by Mor Julius Kuriakose
- Consecration: 14 January 2001 by Patriarch Ignatius Zakka I
- Rank: Metropolitan

Personal details
- Born: April 29, 1954 Ernakulam
- Education: M.A,B.Th. from Papal Seminary, Pune

Mor Ivanios Mathews (born 29 April 1954) is a Syriac Orthodox bishop, currently the Metropolitan of Kandanad Diocese.

== Education ==
Mor Ivanios Mathews has obtained Master of Arts degree and has a Bachelor of Theology degree from Papal Seminary, Pune.

== Ordination ==
In 1972 Baselios Paulose II Catholicos ordained him as Deacon and in 1976 as Kassisso. Later in 2001 Patriarch Ignatius Zakka I consecrated him as metropolitan at Damascus, Syria.
