= Mathews Barnabas =

Mathews Mar Barnabas
- Church: Malankara Orthodox Syrian Church
- Diocese: Angamaly Diocese; Kottayam Diocese; Idukki Diocese; American Diocese; Northeast American Diocese

Orders
- Ordination: Metropolitan 15 May 1978 by Baselios Mar Thoma Mathews I

Personal details
- Born: 9 August 1924; Valayanchirangara, Kerala
- Died: 9 December 2012; Thiruvilla, Kerala

Mathews Mar Barnabas (9 August 1924 - 9 December 2012) was a Metropolitan of the Malankara Orthodox Syrian Church.

== Early life ==
Mathews Mar Barnabas was born as one of a set of twins to Kuruvilla and Mariamma from the Kidangethu Thompra family in Kallarackaparampil house at Valayanchirangara, India. His grandfather and uncle were Orthodox priests. In his childhood, he was called Mathukutty. At the age of seven, he made the decision to become a monk and became vegetarian. His sister later became Rev. Sister Mary, a member of the Kishakkambalam convent.

He and his twin brother used to stay in the Gathsemon Dayara monastery at Piramadam, near Muvattupuzha during their school vacation and experienced monastic life under the guidance of their uncle Fr K.P. Paulose.

== Education ==
He studied Biology at Madras Christian College and did his Masters in Botany in Osmania University while serving the parish in Secunderabad.

He began his theological studies under the guidance of his uncle Fr Paulose. In 1949 he joined the Orthodox Theological Seminary as a special student and studied Syriac for two years. While he was the vicar of the Calcutta parish, he studied in the Bishop's College, Calcutta and earned his B. D. degree from the Serampore University as an external student.

== Career ==
Catholicos Baselios Geevarghese II ordained him as a deacon in 1943 at Mathukutty's home parish, St Peter and St Paul Malankara Orthodox Syrian Church in Valayanchirangara. In 1951, Metropolitan Augen Mar Thimotheos ordained him into the priesthood.

As a deacon, he was a teacher at Kurppumpady M.G. M. High School in 1947. He taught there for two years and continued to teach for another two years at the MD Seminary High School, Kottayam, until he was ordained to priesthood. He also lectured in the Orthodox Theological Seminary at Kottayam from 1967 to 1972 and was also the resident faculty member at the seminary and full-time warden. He then served as chaplain in the Kolenchery Medical Mission Hospital from 1972-1978.

== Ordination as Metropolitan ==
Malankara Association, held in 1977, elected Fr K. K. Mathews as a metropolitan of the church. On 15 May 1978, Baselios Mar Thoma Mathews I consecrated him as bishop at Pazhanji Church, with the ecclesiastical title Mathews Mar Barnabas, and appointed him as assistant bishop of the Angamaly and Kottayam Dioceses.

In 1982 he was appointed as the metropolitan of the newly formed Idukki Diocese.

In 1992/93, Mathews Mar Barnabas was appointed as the diocesan metropolitan of the undivided American Diocese. The Diocese later split into North (based in New York) and South (based in Texas).

== Retirement ==
On 18 January 2011, the Catholicos of The East and Malankara Metropolitan, Baselius Mar Thoma Paulose II, accepted Mathews Mar Barnabas' request to be relieved from administrative responsibilities as diocesan metropolitan of the Northeast American Diocese. Mathews Mar Barnabas left the US on 25 May 2011 and moved to the Monastery of St. Kuriakose the Martyr.

== Death ==
Mathews Mar Barnabas was admitted to Pushpagiri Hospital, Thiruvilla (Kerala), for a pain-related issue. He died on 9 December 2012, and was buried at St Peter's and St Paul's Malankara Orthodox Syrian Church, Valayanchirangara, Perumbavoor, Kerala, India.

== See also ==
- Malankara Orthodox Syrian Church
