= Cheeral, Bathery =

Cheeral
- village
- Location in Kerala, India Cheeral (India)
- Coordinates: 11°36′29.161″N 76°18′51.931″E
- Country: India
- State: Kerala
- District: Wayanad

Population (2011)
  - Total: 15,725

Languages
  - Official: Malayalam, English
- Time zone: UTC+5:30 (IST)
- PIN: 673595
- ISO 3166 code: IN-KL
- Vehicle registration: KL-73

Cheeral is a village in Wayanad district in the state of Kerala, India.

The village is home to Mar Behanan Orthodox Church affiliated with the Sultan Bathery Diocese of the Malankara Orthodox Syrian Church.

== Demographics ==
As of 2011 India census, Cheeral had a population of 15,725, with 7,667 males and 8,058 females.

== Transportation ==
Cheeral village can be accessed from Sultan Bathery, Nambiarkunnu and Ayyankolly (Tamilnadu) with bus services.

The nearest railway station is at Mysore and the nearest airports are Mysore Airport (MYQ - Domestic only -104km), Kozhikode International Airport-120 km, Bengaluru International Airport-290 km, and Kannur International Airport, 114 km.

== Education ==
There is an aided Upper Primary School which has grades from 1st standard to 7th standard and Government High school from grades 8th to 10th. The Government high school which was earlier known as Govt.Model High School was renamed into Government Model Higher secondary School with the allocation of Plus 1 and Plus 2 courses beginning of the academic year 2000.
