= Thazhathangady Pally =

Orthodox parish in Kerala, India

Thazhathangady Mar Baselios Mar Gregorios Orthodox Church
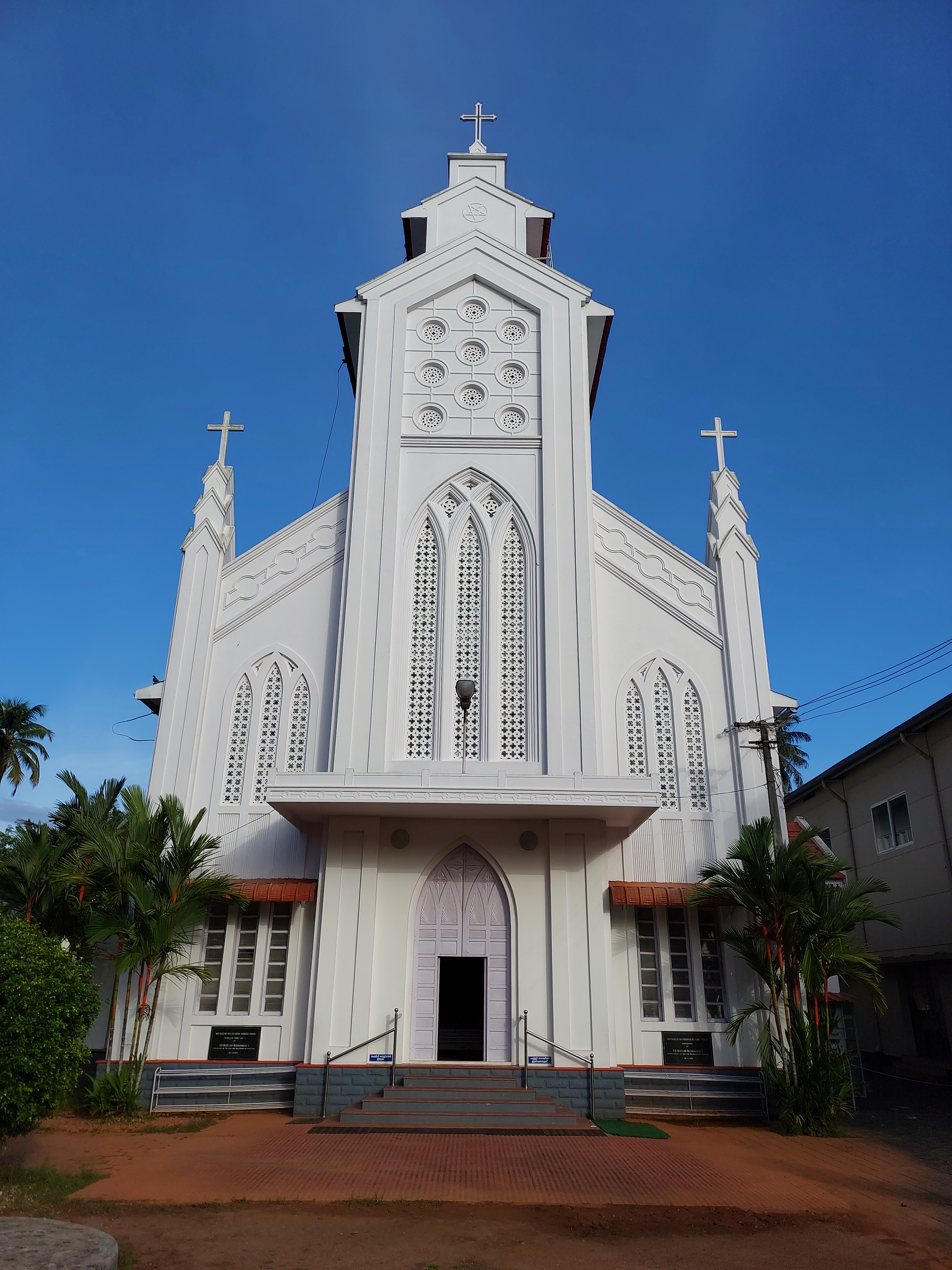
- Thazhathangady church

Thazhathangady Pally or Thazhathangady Mar Baselios Mar Gregorios Orthodox Church is a parish attached to the Kottayam Central Orthodox Diocese of the Malankara Orthodox Syrian Church. The church is located on the banks of the Meenachil River near Kumarakom Road in Kottayam.

== History ==
A worshiping community of Syrian Christian adherents existed in Thazhathangady dating back to the 12th century AD. Thazhathangady was the headquarters of the Thekkumkoor (Thekkumkur) Rajas who ruled over a principality which includes the larger parts of the present Kottayam and Idukki districts. In order to develop the trade and commercial activities of the Kingdom, the Rajas encouraged settlement of Malankara Nazranis who excelled in these spheres of life.

== Present day ==
On the banks of Meenachil River, in close proximity to the Church, there is very ancient, large granite cross, which can be considered as the forerunner of this Church. There was a worship hall near the cross, but it was destroyed in a fire about one century ago under mysterious circumstances. This prayer hall had Mar Behanan Sahada (Behnam, Sarah, and the Forty Martyrs) as the patron saint. When the new Church was erected in the 20th century, the cross tower in front of the Church on the banks of Meenachil river, was aptly named after Mar Bahanan Sahada. Mar Basil Media is the official Media of this church. Fr. Dr Gheevarghese Vettikunnel is the present Vicar of this parish.More than two hundred families are at present members of this parish.

== Official website ==
- "Thazhathangady Mar Baselios Mar Gregorios Orthodox Church, Kottayam". Archived from the original on 18 May 2015.
