= Yakob Mar Irenaios =

Malankara Syrian Orthodox bishop

His Grace Yakob Mar Irenaios
- Church: Malankara Orthodox Syrian Church
- Diocese: Kochi Diocese
- In office: 1993 – Present
- Predecessor: Late Lamented Zachariah Mar Anthonios

Orders
- Ordination: As Deacon: 1970; As Priest: 1975; As Ramban: 1992
- Consecration: 16th Aug 1993 by His Holiness Moran Mar Baselios Marthoma Mathews II
- Rank: Bishop

Personal details
- Born: 15 August 1949 (age 77) Kallooppara
- Parents: Mr. T.O Cherian, Mrs. Kunjelyamma Cherian
- Education: Madras University

Yakob Mar Irenaios is Metropolitan of the Kochi Diocese of the Malankara Orthodox Syrian Church. He previously served as the metropolitan of the Madras Diocese and as the Assistant Metropolitan of the Malabar Diocese. He is known for advocating the use of headscarves for women in church settings, particularly during wedding ceremonies, a position that has drawn criticism from some who view it as reinforcing traditional gender roles.

== Early life ==
Mar Irenaios was born in the Aruvidan Pallikal Family of Kallooppara on 15 August 1949 to Mr. T.O Cherian and Mrs. Kunjeliyamma Cherian. His Grace attended the MGD High School, Puthussery for his schooling. Later, he attended the Chengannur Christian College for his Pre Degree.

Mar Irenaios is a member of Kallooppara St. Mary's Orthodox Church.

== Priesthood ==
Late Lamented Thoma Mar Dionysius, the then Metropolitan of Niranam Diocese ordained him a deacon in the year 1970. Five years later, in 1975, Mar Irenaios was elevated to the order of priests by His Grace Thomas Mar Thimothios (later, Baselios Marthoma Didymos I), the then metropolitan of Malabar Diocese.

== Metropolitan ==
His Holiness Moran Mar Baselios Mar Thoma Mathews II, Catholicos of the East and Malankara Metropolitan consecrated him bishop on 16 August 1993 under the name Yakob Mar Irenaios.

He was given the charge of Malabar Diocese as an Assistant Metropolitan in 1995. Later, he was given the Diocesan charge of the Madras Diocese from 1997 to 2009. Furthermore, he became the Metropolitan of Kochi Diocese in the 2009 and continues in the same capacity.

His Grace also serves as the president of the MOC Publications, the official publishers of the church's liturgical books among others.
