= Malankara Orthodox Diocese of Asia Pacific =

Diocese of the Malankara Orthodox Syrian Church

Diocese of Asia Pacific

Orthodox
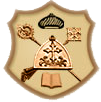
- Catholicate Emblem

Location
- Territory: Asia and Pacific Regions
- Metropolitan: Yuhanon Mar Diascoros(Asst.)

Information
- First holder: Baselios Marthoma Mathews III
- Rite: Malankara Rite
- Established: 01 November 2024
- Diocese: Asia Pacific Orthodox Diocese
- Parent church: Malankara Orthodox Syrian Church

Website
- mosc.in/dioceses

The Diocese of Asia Pacific is one of the 32 dioceses of the Malankara Orthodox Syrian Church. The diocese has jurisdiction in Asia & Pacific region including Australia, New Zealand, Malaysia and Singapore. The diocese is headquartered at Canberra. The new diocese is effective from 1 November 2024.

== History ==
The Diocese of Asia Pacific was formed on 1 November 2024, and was declared by Baselios Marthoma Mathews III Catholicose of the East & Malankara Metropolitan through the Kalpana No.267/2024 dated 30–9–2024. This decision was made following thorough studies and evaluations, based on the recommendations from Association Managing Committee on 10 October 2024, and the Holy Episcopal Synod on 29 October 2024.

== Diocesan Metropolitan ==
List of Diocesan Metropolitan
From	Until	Metropolitan	Notes
1 November 2024	Present	Baselios Marthoma Mathews III Catholicos	1st Metropolitan of Diocese, Ruled as Malankara Metropolitan

Assistant Metropolitan
From	Until	Metropolitan	Notes
1 November 2024	Present	H.G. Dr. Yuhanon Mar Diascoros	Assistant Metropolitan

== List of parishes ==
List of Parishes and Congregations in the Diocese of Asia Pacific

=== Australia ===
- Victoria
  1. Melbourne, St. Mary's Indian Orthodox Cathedral
  2. Melbourne, St. Gregorios Indian Orthodox Church
  3. Epping, St George Malankara Orthodox Congregation
  4. Ballarat, St. Dionysius Indian Orthodox Congregation
  5. Geelong, St. George Indian Orthodox Church
  6. Bendigo, St. Gregorios Malankara Orthodox Congregation
  7. Shepparton, St. Thomas Malankara Orthodox Congregation
  8. South Gippsland, St. Thomas Malankara Orthodox Congregation
  9. Leongatha, St. Thomas Malankara Orthodox Congregation
- New South Wales
  1. Sydney, St. Thomas Indian Orthodox Cathedral
  2. Sydney, St. Mary's Indian Orthodox Church
  3. Central Coast, St Mary's Indian Orthodox Church
  4. Wagga Wagga, St. Mary's Indian Orthodox Congregation
  5. Wollongong, St. George Indian Orthodox Congregation
  6. Newcastle, St. Luke's Indian Orthodox Congregation
  7. Orange, St. Thomas Malankara Orthodox Congregation
  8. Dubbo, St. Mary’s Orthodox Congregation
  9. Port Macquire, St. George Malankara Orthodox Congregation
  10. Tweed Heads, St. Mary Malankara Orthodox Congregation
  11. Wyong, St. Mary Malankara Orthodox Congregation
  12. Tamworth, St. Thomas Malankara Orthodox Congregation
- Queensland
  1. Brisbane, St. George Indian Orthodox Church
  2. Brisbane, St. Peters & St. Paul's Orthodox Church
  3. Sunshine Coast, St. Mary's Indian Orthodox Church
  4. Gold Coast, St. Gregorios Indian Orthodox Congregation
  5. Cairns, St. Mary's Indian Orthodox Congregation
  6. Townsville, St. Mary's Malankara Orthodox Congregation
  7. Rockhampton, St. Mary's Malankara Orthodox Congregation
  8. Toowoomba, St. Dionysius Malankara Orthodox Congregation
  9. Hervey Bay, St. Kuriakose Malankara Orthodox Congregation
- Western Australia
  1. Perth, St. George Indian Orthodox Church
  2. Albany, St. Thomas Malankara Orthodox Congregation
- South Australia
  1. Adelaide, St. Gregorios Indian Orthodox Church
  2. Adelaide, St. Dionysius Malankara Orthodox Congregation
- Australian Capital Territory
  1. Canberra, St. Gregorios Indian Orthodox Church
- Northern Territory
  1. St.George Indian Orthodox Church, Darwin
  2. Alice Springs, St. Mary Malankara Orthodox Congregation
- Tasmania
  1. Tasmania, St. George Malankara Orthodox Congregation

=== New Zealand ===
- North Island
  1. Auckland, St. Dionysius Indian Orthodox Church
  2. Hamilton, St. Gregorios Indian Orthodox Church
  3. Wellington, Mar Dionysius Indian Orthodox Church
  4. Tauranga, St. Thomas Indian Orthodox Congregation
  5. New Plymouth, St. Stephen Malankara Orthodox Congregation
  6. Palmerston North, St. Mary's Indian Orthodox Congregation
  7. Whanganui, St. George Malankara Orthodox Congregation
  8. Whangarei, St. George Malankara Orthodox Congregation
- South Island
  1. Christchurch, St. Mary's Indian Orthodox Church
  2. Invercargill, St. George Malankara Orthodox Congregation

=== Malaysia ===
1. Malaysia, St. Mary the Theotokos Indian Orthodox Cathedral
2. Banting Congregation
3. Seremban Congregation

=== Singapore ===
1. Singapore, St. Thomas Indian Orthodox Cathedral
