= Malankara Orthodox Diocese of Canada =

Diocese of the Malankara Orthodox Syrian Church

Diocese of Canada

Orthodox
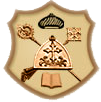
- Catholicate Emblem

Location
- Territory: Canada
- Metropolitan: Zachariah Mar Nicholovos(Asst.)

Information
- First holder: Baselios Marthoma Mathews III
- Rite: Malankara Rite
- Established: 1 November 2024
- Diocese: Canada Orthodox Diocese
- Parent church: Malankara Orthodox Syrian Church

Website
- mosc.in/dioceses

The Diocese of Canada is one of the 32 dioceses of the Malankara Orthodox Syrian Church. The diocese has jurisdiction over all parts of Canada. The diocese is headquartered at Toronto. The new diocese becomes effective on 1 November 2024. The Malankara Metropolitan will take charge of the new diocese.

== History ==
The Diocese of Canada was formed on 1 November 2024, and was announced by Baselios Marthoma Mathews III Catholicose of the East & Malankara Metropolitan through the Kalpana No.267/2024 dated 30 September 2024. This decision was made following thorough studies and evaluations, based on the recommendations from Association Managing Committee on 10 October 2024, and the Holy Episcopal Synod on 29 October 2024.

== Diocesan Metropolitan ==
List of Diocesan Metropolitan
From	Until	Metropolitan	Notes
1 November 2024	present	Baselios Marthoma Mathews III Catholicos	1st Metropolitan of Diocese, Ruled as Malankara Metropolitan

Assistant Metropolitan
From	Until	Metropolitan	Notes
5 November 2024	present	Zachariah Mar Nicholovos	Assistant metropolitan

== List of parishes ==
List of Parishes and Congregations included in the Diocese of Canada

- St. Gregorios Malankara Orthodox Church Toronto (Professional court)
- St. Mary's Malankara Orthodox Church of Toronto, Ajax.
- St. Thomas Malankara Orthodox Church Ottawa
- St. Thomas Malankara Orthodox Church Toronto
- St. Gregorios Malankara Orthodox Church, George Town. (Norval Parish)
- St. John's Malankara Orthodox Syrian Church Hamilton
- St. Thomas Malankara Orthodox Church Montreal
- St. Mary's Malankara Orthodox Congregation Kitchener, Canada
- St. James Malankara Orthodox Congregation Halifax, Canada
- St. John the Baptist Malankara Orthodox Congregation Newfoundland and Labrador
- St. George Malankara Orthodox Church, Vancouver
- St. Peter and St. Paul Malankara Orthodox Congregation, Victoria
- St. Thomas Malankara Malankara Orthodox Congregation, Prince George
- St. Gregorios Malankara Orthodox Church, Edmonton
- St. Mary Malankara Orthodox Congregation, Chilliwack
- St. Mary Malankara Orthodox Congregation, Saskatoon, Saskatchewan
- St. George Malankara Orthodox Congregation, Regina, Saskatchewan
- St. Mary's Malankara Orthodox Congregation, Calgary
- St Joseph Malankara Orthodox Congregation, Windsor
- St George Malankara Orthodox Congregation, London
- Mar Baselios Yeldho and Mar Gregorios Malankara Orthodox Congregation, Niagara Falls
- St George Malankara Orthodox Congregation, Sudbury, Canada
- St Mark Malankara Orthodox Congregation, Prince Edward Island
- St Mary Malankara Orthodox Congregation, Thunder Bay
- St Philip Malankara Orthodox Congregation, Moncton
- St George Malankara Orthodox Congregation, Ottawa
- St. Basil Malankara Orthodox Congregation, Corner Brook
- St. Mary Malankara Orthodox Congregation, Sydney, Nova Scotia
- St. Luke Malankara Orthodox Congregation, Saint John, New Brunswick
