= St. Bursouma's Church, Attuva =

Church in Attuva, India

St. Bursouma’s Orthodox Church, Attuva
- St. Bursouma’s Orthodox Church, Attuva
- Denomination: Indian Orthodox Church; Parish
- Tradition: Malayalam
- Website: St. Bursoumas Orthodox Church

History
- Founded: 3 February 1912

Administration
- Diocese: Chengannur Diocese

St. Bursouma's Orthodox Syrian Church is a parish of the Malankara Orthodox Syrian Church in Attuva (between Pandalam and Mavelikara) in the Alappuzha district of Kerala, India. It is under the Chengannur Orthodox Diocese. Mar Bursouma is its patron saint.

The parish was established in 1912, one of the first Malankara Orthodox Syrian churches established in the name of Mar Bursouma. It celebrated its centenary jubilee in February 2012.

== Institutions ==
- St. Bursouma's Public School & Junior College
