= UK, Europe and Africa Malankara Orthodox Diocese =

Diocese of UK, Europe and Africa

MALANKARA
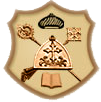
- Catholicate Emblem

Location
- Country: UK, Europe
- Territory: UK, Europe and Africa
- Metropolitan: Abraham Stephanos
- Headquarters: St. Gregorios Indian Orthodox Cathedral, Cranfield Road, Brockley, London SE4 1UF

Information
- First holder: Thomas Mar Makarios
- Denomination: Malankara Orthodox Syrian Church
- Rite: Malankara Rite
- Established: 1975
- Diocese: UK, Europe and Africa Diocese
- Cathedral: St Gregorios Indian Orthodox Cathedral, Brockley SE4 1UF

Website
- UK, Europe and Africa Diocese

The Diocese of UK, Europe and Africa is one of the 32 dioceses of the Malankara Orthodox Syrian Church with its headquarters in London.

== History ==
The roots of this parish can be traced back to the 1930s. Abu Alexios of the Bethany monastery (later Bishop Mar Theodosius) was the first priest of the church ever to visit the UK. Canon John Douglas and others formed an association called 'The Friends of the Syrian Church' to render help to the ancient church in India by offering higher theological training; Abu Alexios of the Bethany monastery (later Bishop Mar Theodosius) was the first candidate chosen. He participated in the Jubilee celebrations of the Community of Resurrection, Mirfield and made connections with several religious communities in UK.

The second priest who came to UK under this scheme was Fr. T.V.John of U.C. college Alwaye in 1934. He conducted Holy Qurbana in Malayalam in Kings College chapel. Several others came to the UK under this programme. Catholicose, Baselios Geevarghese II visited in 1937, accompanied by Ramban C M Thomas (later Metropolitan Dionysius) and Abu Alexios for the second "Faith and Order Conference" of the World Council of Churches in Edinburgh. After the conference Ramban C. M. Thomas stayed with the Cowley fathers for studies in Oxford and conducted services.

In the 1950s and 60s the Malayalee Christian community had grown gradually, however, services were held only occasionally by visiting priests and prelates. They include Metropolitan Mathews Coorilos (Baselios Mar Thoma Mathews II), Fr. K Philipose (later Metropolitan Theophilus), Fr. C. T. Eapen, Fr. P. S. Samuel, and others. Fr.P.V.Joseph (late Mar Pachomios), Fr.Yohannan (late metropolitan Mar Athanasius) came to UK for higher studies and served the community. Fr. Philipose visited the congregation on several occasions during his trips to Europe in connection with the various programs of the World Council of Churches, and later became bishop Mar Theophilus. Dn. K.G.George (later bishop Geverghese Mar Ivanios) followed the footsteps and stayed with Cawley Fathers in Oxford for six years. All these years services were conducted in Indian YMCA chapel, Fitzroy Square, London and all the Malayalee Christians participated irrespective of their denominational differences. In early 1970s Geverghese Mar Osthathios organized the St. Gregorios fellowship during one of his pastoral visits. The community grew in size with the arrival of more migrants; in 1974 they split on denominational grounds. Members of Orthodox Syrian Church and Marthoma Church formed separate congregations and commenced worshipping separately.

When the diocese outside Kerala was re-organized, diocesan metropolitan Thomas Mar Makarios visited the UK church in 1976 and declared as a parish with St. Gregorios of Parumala as patron saint; Fr. Abraham Aluckal (later bishop Mar Severios) was appointed as its first vicar. In the 1979 re-organization of the dioceses, the London parish came under the diocese of Delhi under the pastoral care of Paulos Mar Gregorios, who visited the parish on a regular basis. When the new diocese of Europe, UK and Canada was formed in 1993, this parish came under the jurisdiction of Thomas Mar Makarios. With the establishment of the new diocese of UK, Europe and Africa, Mathews Mar Thimothios took charge as the Metropolitan of the London parish.

Fr. Mathews M. Daniel, Philipose Mar Eusebius, Kuriakose Cor-Episcopa, O. Thomas, Geverghese Mar Coorilose, Yakoob Mar Elias (Fr. V. M. James), Fr. Yohannan Ramban, Fr. Skariah Ramban, and Fr. Abraham Thomas served in succession as vicars of the parish. Services were held in London since 1978 in the Church of England St. Andrew-by-the-Wardrobe Church, and since 2005 in St. Gregorios Church Brockley, London.

== Since 2009 ==
The Diocese of UK, Europe and Africa was formed in 2009, with Diocesan Metropolitan Mathews Mar Thimothios. Diocese of UK, Europe and Africa includes the territorial area of England, Wales, Northern Ireland and Germany, France, Ireland, Switzerland, Spain, Portugal, Denmark, Turkey, Greece, Cape Town in South Africa and Kenya.

The Diocesan headquarters is Malankara House, 35 Hennman Close, Swindon, SN25 4ZW, UK. The Administrative Annexe in India is in Parumala Seminary. This was consecrated by Baselios Mar Thoma Didymus I Valiya Bava. As of 2013 the diocese had 41 Parishes and Congregations across 10 countries.

== Diocesan Metropolitan ==
Diocesan Metropolitan
From	Until	Metropolitan	Notes
1979	2008	H.G. Dr. Thomas Mar Makarios	Died on 23 Feb 2008 in Newcastle, England
2009	2022	H.G. Dr. Mathews Mar Thimothios	Transferred to the Chengannur Diocese
2022	Present	H.G. Abraham Mar Stephanos	

== List of parishes in the UK, Europe and Africa ==
=== United Kingdom ===
- St. Thomas Malankara Orthodox Congregation, Aberdeen
- St. Basil Malankara Orthodox Congregation, Bath
- St. Nicholas Malankara Orthodox Congregation, Bedford
- St. Stephen's Malankara Orthodox Church, Birmingham
- St.Antony's Malankara Orthodox Congregation, Boston
- St. Mary's Malankara Orthodox Church, Bristol
- St. Thomas Malankara Orthodox Church, Cambridge
- St. Gregorios Malankara Orthodox Congregation, Canterbury
- St. Mary Magdalene Malankara Orthodox Congregation, Carlisle
- St. Luke The Evangelist Malankara Orthodox Congregation, Chelmsford
- St. Ephrem Malankara Orthodox Congregation, Chester
- St. George Malankara Orthodox Congregation, City of London
- St. Stephen The Martyr Malankara Orthodox Congregation, Colchester
- St. Mary's Malankara Orthodox Congregation, Coventry
- Holy Trinity Malankara Orthodox Congregation, Crawley
- St. Peter & St. Paul Malankara Orthodox Congregation, East Kent
- St. John The Apostle Malankara Orthodox Congregation, Edinburgh
- St. Gregorios Malankara Orthodox Congregation, Glasgow
- St. Mark Malankara Orthodox Congregation, Harlow
- St. Mary Malankara Orthodox Congregation, [Hayes]]
- St. Thomas Malankara Orthodox Church, Hemel Hempstead London
- St. Behanan Malankara Orthodox Congregation, Hertfordshire
- St. George Malankara Orthodox Congregation, Ipswich
- St. Mary Malankara Orthodox Congregation, King's Lynn
- St Gregorios of Parumala Malankara Orthodox Congregation, Leeds
- St. George's Malankara Orthodox Congregation, Leicester
- St. Andrew Malankara Orthodox Congregation, Lincolnshire
- St. Thomas Malankara Orthodox Church, Liverpool
- St. Gregorios Malankara Orthodox Cathedral,London
- St. George's Malankara Orthodox Church, Manchester
- Holy Innocents Malankara Orthodox Church Pilgrim Church, Neath
- St. Thomas Malankara Orthodox Church, Newcastle
- St. Dionysius Malankara Orthodox Congregation, Northampton
- St. Behanan Malankara Orthodox Congregation, North Wales
- St. Luke Malankara Orthodox Congregation, North Yorkshire
- St. Kuriakose Malankara Orthodox Congregation, Norwich
- St Mary Malankara Orthodox Congregation, Nottingham
- St. Mary's Malankara Orthodox Congregation, Oxford
- St. Gregorios Malankara Orthodox Congregation, Peterborough
- St. Elijah Malankara Orthodox Congregation, Plymouth
- St. Thomas Indian Orthodox Church, Poole
- St. George's Malankara Orthodox Congregation, Portsmouth
- St. George Malankara Orthodox Congregation, Preston
- St. George's Malankara Orthodox Congregation, Sheffield
- St. Gregorios Malankara Orthodox Congregation, Southend-on-Sea
- Mar Baselios Gregorios Malankara Orthodox Church, Southampton
- St. Mary Malankara Orthodox Congregation, Stockport
- St. John the Baptist Malankara Orthodox Congregation, Stoke-on-Trent
- St. Mary Malankara Orthodox Congregation, Sunderland
- St. Gregorios Malankara Orthodox Congregation, Swindon
- St. Thomas Malankara Orthodox Congregation, Taunton
- St. Barnabas Malankara Orthodox Congregation, Weston Super Mare
- St. Stephen Malankara Orthodox Congregation, Woking

=== Europe ===
Austria:

- St. Thomas Indian Orthodox Church, Vienna

Germany:

- St. Gregorios Indian Orthodox Church, Bielefeld
- St. Gregorios Orthodox Church, Bonn-Cologne
- St. Thomas Malankara Orthodox Community. Frankfurt
- St. Thomas Malankara Orthodox Community, Hannover
- St. Thomas Malankara Orthodox Community, Berlin
- St. Thomas Malankara Orthodox Community, Hamburg
- St. Thomas Malankara Orthodox Community, Nurnberg
- St. Thomas Malankara Orthodox Community, Essen
- St. Thomas Malankara Orthodox Community, Stuttgart
- St. Thomas Malankara Orthodox Community, Munchen

Republic of Ireland:

- St. Kuriakose Malankara Orthodox Church Tipperary
- St. Gregorios Indian Orthodox Congregation, Belfast
- Holy Trinity Indian Orthodox Congregation, Cork
- St. Peter's and St. Paul's Indian Orthodox Congregation, Drogheda
- St. Thomas Indian Orthodox Congregation, Dublin
- St. Mary's Indian Orthodox Congregation, Lucan,
- St. Elijah Indian Orthodox Congregation, Galway
- St. George Indian Orthodox Congregation, Julianstown, County Meath
- St. Matthew Malankara Orthodox Congregation Kerry
- St. George Indian Orthodox Congregation, Limerick
- St. Stephens Indian Orthodox Congregation, Mullingar
- St. Mary Malankara Orthodox Congregation Portlaoise
- St. Thomas Indian Orthodox Congregation, Sligo
- St. Gregorios Indian Orthodox Congregation, Waterford

Malta:

- St Peters and St Paul's Indian Orthodox Congregation

Switzerland:

- St. Gregorios Indian Orthodox Church, Thurgau

Netherlands:

- St. Philip and St Bartholomew Indian Orthodox Congregation, Rotterdam

Italy:

- St. Thomas Malankara Orthodox Congregation, Rome

Georgia:

- Mar Elia Indian Orthodox Congregation, Tbilisi

Portugal:

- Malankara Community in Lisbon

Poland:

- St.Marys Indian Orthodox Congregation, Warsaw

France:

- St. Marys Indian Orthodox Congregation, Paris

Belgium:

- St. James the Apostle Indian Orthodox Congregation, Leuven

Luxembourg:

- St Joseph's Indian Orthodox Congregation, Luxembourg City

=== Africa ===
Nigeria:

- St. Stephen's Indian Orthodox Church, Lagos

South Africa:

- St. Thomas Indian Orthodox Church Johannesburg
