= Kochi Orthodox Diocese =

Diocese of the Malankara Orthodox Syrian Church

Diocese of Kochi

Orthodox
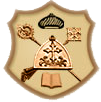
- Catholicate Emblem

Location
- Country: India
- Territory: Kochi
- Metropolitan: H. G. Yakob Mar Irenios
- Headquarters: Zion Seminary, Koratty East P.O, Chirangara, Chalakudy- 680 308

Information
- First holder: Karottu Veettil Semavoon Mar Dionysius
- Rite: Malankara Rite
- Established: 1876, by Ignatius Peter IV
- Diocese: Kochi Diocese
- Parent church: Malankara Orthodox Syrian Church

Website
- Kochi Diocese

The Diocese of Kochi is one of the 32 diocese of the Malankara Orthodox Syrian Church. The diocese was created after the Mulanthuruthy Synod in 1876. Yakob Mar Irenios is the Metropoliton of the diocese. The head office is located in Zion Seminary, Korratti East, Chalakkudi.

== History ==
Kochi is one of seven dioceses created after the Mulanthuruthi Christian association (synod) conducted under the leadership of Ignatios Pathros III, Patriarch of Antioch in 1876. Others are Kottayam, Kandanadu, Angamali, Niranam, Kollam, Thumpamon. The diocese was created with 21 parishes in Kochi State and British Malabar. Semavun Mar Dionysius was the first Metropolitan. Dionysious V, Dionysious VI, Poulose Mar Athanasios, Poulose Mar Severios, Daniel Mar Pilexinos, Yuhanon Mar Severios, Yakob Mar Policurpos etc. led the diocese in different times. Baselios Geevarghese I, Baselios Augen I, Baselios Mar Thoma Mathews I also led the diocese. Maliankara, Paloor, Kokamangalam, Kottakayal, churches founded by St. Thomas is situated in this diocese. Dionysious II, Dionysius V, Parumala Thirumeni came from this diocese. Later, the diocese divided into the Malabar and Kunnamkulam dioceses. The tombs of Yuhanon Mar Severios, Yakob Mar Policurpos are in the Zion Aramana. In the time of 1992, there were 38 parishes and eight chapels.

Zachariah Mar Anthonios Metropolitan was in charge of Kochi Diocese before the current Metropolitan Yakob Mar Irenious.

== Diocesan Metropolitans ==
Kochi Orthodox Diocesan Metropolitan
From	Until	Metropolitan	Notes
17-May-1877	02-Oct-1886	Karottu Veettil Semavoon Mar Dionysius	1st Metropolitan of the diocese
1886	1907	Kadavil Paulose Mar Athanasios	2nd Metropolitan of the diocese
1907	1909	Pulikkottil Joseph Mar Dionysius II (Dionysius V)	3rd Metropolitan of the diocese, Ruled as Malankara Metropolitan
1909	1934	Geevarghese Mar Dionysius of Vattasseril (Dionysius VI)	4th Metropolitan of the diocese, Ruled as Malankara Metropolitan
1934	1958	Baselios Geevarghese II Catholicos	5th Metropolitan of the diocese, Ruled as Malankara Metropolitan
1958		Paulose Mar Severios	6th Metropolitan of the diocese
01-Oct-1966	1973	Yuhanon Mar Severios	7th Metropolitan of the diocese
1973	1975	Baselios Augen I Catholicos	8th Metropolitan of the diocese, Ruled as Malankara Metropolitan
1975	1978	Baselios Mar Thoma Mathews I Catholicos	9th Metropolitan of the diocese, Ruled as Malankara Metropolitan
1978	26-Dec-1986	Yakob Mar Policarpus	10th Metropolitan of the diocese
1987	1991	Baselios Mar Thoma Mathews II Catholicos	11th Metropolitan of the diocese, Ruled as Malankara Metropolitan
1991	2009	Zachariah Mar Anthonios	12th Metropolitan of the diocese
2009	Incumbent	Yakob Mar Irenios	13th Metropolitan of the diocese

== Parish list ==
- Areepalam St. Mary's Orthodox Church
- Ayyampilly St. John's Orthodox Church
- Chalakkudy St. Thomas Orthodox Church
- Chembukkavu St. Thomas Orthodox Church
- Cherai St. Mary's Orthodox Church
- Chavarmpadom St. George Orthodox Church
- Chuvanammanu St. George Orthodox Church
- Elamkulam St. Gregorios Orthodox Church
- Ernakulam St. Mary's Orthodox Cathedral
- Fort Kochi St. Peter and Paul's Orthodox Church
- Irinjalakkuda St. Mary's Orthodox Church
- Kanaikode St. Mary's Orthodox Church
- Kanjiramattom St. Ignatius Orthodox Church
- Kannara St. George Orthodox Church
- Karippakkunnu Mar Baselios Orthodox Church
- Kattilappoovam St. Mary's Orthodox Church
- Koratty St. Kuriakose Orthodox Church
- Mattancherry St. George Orthodox Koonankurishu Church
- Manthuruthel St. John the Baptist Orthodox Church
- Mulanthuruthy Marthoman St. Thomas Cathedral
- Marackal St. George Orthodox Church
- Murikkungal St. Mary's Orthodox Church
- Nehru Nagar St. Gregorios Orthodox Church
- Padamugal St. John the Baptist Orthodox Church
- Palarivattom St. George Orthodox Valiyapali
- Pengamuck St. Peter's and St. Paul's Orthodox Church
- Poolakkal St. George Orthodox Church
- Thampurattimoola St. Mary's Orthodox Church
- Thevara St. Thomas Orthodox Church
- Thenidukku Mar Gregorios Orthodox Church
- Thirumarayur St. George Orthodox Church
- Thripunithara St. Gregorios Orthodox Church
- Thrissur St. Ignatious Orthodox Cathedral
- Vadavukode St. Mary's Orthodox Church
- Vadayamparambu Mar Behanan Orthodox Church
- Vaniyampara St. George Orthodox Church
- Vattayi St. Mary's Orthodox Church
- Vyttila St. Gregorios Orthodox Church
