= Thomas Makarios =

Thomas Mar Makarios (born 26 May 1926 in India and died on 23 Feb 2008 in Newcastle, England) was the founder of the diocese of the United States and Canada of the Malankara Orthodox Church and the first metropolitan of the UK, Europe, Africa diocese, the diocese of the United States and Canada and the Diocese of Bombay.

Makarios began his career as a school teacher in India, resigning this position to study theology. He was ordained a priest in 1952, and was appointed first vicar of the Malankara Orthodox Church in New Delhi. In 1963 he entered the United States to study for an advanced degree, receiving a Master's in religion from Virginia Theological Seminary, and a doctorate in theology from Union Theological Seminary of Richmond, Virginia.

Upon returning to India he was appointed a professor of church history at the Orthodox Theological Seminary in Kottayam. He was elevated to bishop in 1975 and appointed the first metropolitan bishop of the new Bombay Diocese.

Indian Christians who had settled in the United States applied for support for their religious efforts in the 1970s, and in 1979 Bishop Makarios moved to Staten Island, New York, in 1980 consecrating the first parish church of the new diocese, St. George Malankara Orthodox Church, in the New Dorp Beach section of Staten Island. This was followed by the consecration of an additional 74 parishes in the diocese by the bishop.

From 1983 until his death, he was a visiting professor of religious studies at Alma College in Alma, Michigan.

Bishop Makarios later headed the Diocese of the United Kingdom and Europe. While making an annual pastoral visit to parishes in England, he was injured in a traffic accident on 5 January 2008, dying of his injuries seven weeks later.

== See also ==
- Malankara Orthodox Diocese of Northeast America
- UK, Europe and Africa Malankara Orthodox Diocese
