= Abraham Stephanos =

Oriental Orthodox bishop

Abraham Mar Stephanos
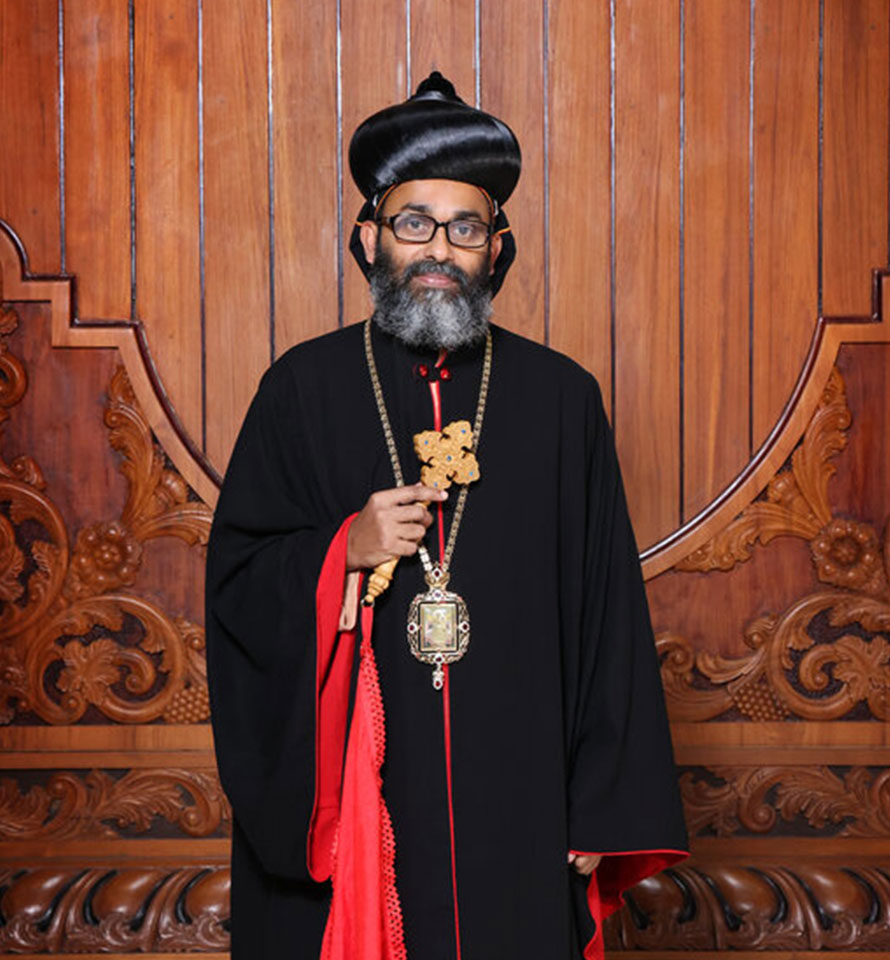
- Abraham Mar Stephanos
- Church: Malankara Orthodox Syrian Church
- Diocese: UK, Europe and Africa Malankara Orthodox Diocese
- In office: 2022–present
- Predecessor: Mathews Mar Thimothios

Orders
- Ordination: 28 July 2022 by Baselios Marthoma Mathews III

Personal details
- Born: 11 June 1969 (age 56) Mylapra, Kerala, India

Abraham Mar Stephanos (born 11 June 1969) is a Metropolitan of the Malankara Orthodox Syrian Church and currently serves as the Metropolitan of the UK, Europe and Africa Malankara Orthodox Diocese.

== Early life and education ==
Abraham Mar Stephanos was born on 11 June 1969 in Mylapra, Kerala, India, to K. A. Thomas and Annamma.

He completed his primary education at Seventh Day Adventist School, Pathanamthitta, and later studied at Marthoma High School. He pursued his pre-degree and bachelor's degree in Mathematics at Catholicate College, Pathanamthitta.

He undertook theological studies at the Orthodox Theological Seminary, Kottayam (Old Seminary), where he completed his Bachelor of Divinity (B.D.) and Graduate in Sacred Theology (G.S.T.). He later earned a Master of Theology (M.Th.) from the Federation of Free Research and Related Centres (FFRRC), and an M.A. in Late Antiquity and Byzantine Studies from King's College London.

== Ordained ministry ==
He was ordained as a sub-deacon in 1998 by Kuriakose Mar Clemis Metropolitan at Mar Baselios Dayara, Pathanamthitta. In 1999, he was ordained as a deacon by Baselios Mar Thoma Mathews II at the Old Seminary, Kottayam.

He was ordained to the priesthood on 8 April 2000 by Kuriakose Mar Clemis Metropolitan at St. George Orthodox Church, Mylapra.

== Episcopal ministry ==
Abraham Mar Stephanos was elected as a Metropolitan candidate by the Malankara Syrian Christian Association on 25 February 2022 at Kolenchery.

He was elevated to the rank of Ramban on 2 June 2022 at Parumala Seminary. He was consecrated as Metropolitan on 28 July 2022 at St. Mary’s Cathedral, Pazhanji, by Baselios Marthoma Mathews III, and was given the episcopal name Mar Stephanos.

He currently serves as the Metropolitan of the UK, Europe, and Africa Diocese of the Malankara Orthodox Syrian Church.

== Other roles ==
He serves as the President of OASSIS (Orthodox Association for Spiritual Support to International Students).
