= Kottayam Central Orthodox Diocese =

Diocese of Kottayam Central

Orthodox
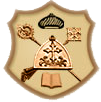
- Catholicate Emblem

Location
- Country: India
- Territory: Kottayam
- Metropolitan: Baselios Marthoma Mathews III; Yuhanon Mar Diascoros(Asst.)
- Headquarters: Catholicate Aramana, Devalokam P.O, Muttambalam Via, Kottayam- 686 004

Information
- First holder: Baselios Marthoma Mathews I Catholicos
- Rite: Malankara Rite
- Established: 21 April 1982
- Diocese: Kottayam Central Diocese
- Parent church: Malankara Orthodox Syrian Church

Website
- Kottayam Central Diocese

Kottayam Central Diocese is one of the 32 dioceses of the Malankara Orthodox Syrian Church. The diocese was created in 1982. This diocese is in the direct control of Catholicos of the East (Malankara Metropolitan).The current Metropolitan of the diocese is the Malankara Metropolitan H.H Baselios Marthoma Mathews III . The head office is located in Devalokam Aramana, Kottayam.

== History ==
Kottayam Central Diocese was created in 1982.

Even before the formation of the diocese, most of the churches in the diocese were directly ruled by the Malankara Metropolitan . According to the available historical documents, these churches were administered in this manner before the Mulanthuruthy Synod which held in 1876.In 1876, when seven dioceses were formed as per the decisions of the Mulanthuruthy Synod which held at 1876 headed by H.H Ignatius Peter 4, the then Patriarch of Antioch, these churches were ruled by the then Malankara Metropolitan H.G Pulikkottil Joseph Mar Dionysius 2 . In 1958, when the both factions united, the then Malankara Metropolitan H.H Baselios Geevarghese 2 stated in his Kalpana regarding the division of the churches that these churches were and should continue to be directly ruled by the Malankara Metropolitans .

This diocese was officially created by the partition of Kottayam Diocese in 1982. The diocese always under the control of Catholicos of the East (Malankara Metropolitan). During the time of Baselios Mar Thoma Mathews I Kottayam diocese was divided and created this diocese in 1982 April 21. The diocese was formed with parishes situated in Kottayam diocese but controlled directly by Malankara Metropolitan. Malankara Metropolitan is the Metropolitan of this diocese. The head office of this diocese is in Devalokam Aramana, head office of Malankara Orthodox Church.

== Diocesan Metropolitans ==
Kottayam Central Orthodox Diocesan Metropolitan
From	Until	Metropolitan	Notes
21-Apr-1982	27-Apr-1991	Baselios Marthoma Mathews I Catholicos	1st Metropolitan of the diocese, Ruled as Malankara Metropolitan
29-Apr-1991	31-Oct-2005	Baselios Marthoma Mathews II Catholicos	2nd Metropolitan of the diocese, Ruled as Malankara Metropolitan
31-Oct-2005	01-Nov-2010	Baselios Marthoma Didymus I Catholicos	3rd Metropolitan of the diocese, Ruled as Malankara Metropolitan
01-Nov-2010	12-Jul-2021	Baselios Marthoma Paulose II Catholicos	4th Metropolitan of the diocese, Ruled as Malankara Metropolitan
15-Oct-2021	Incumbent	Baselios Marthoma Mathews III Catholicos	5th Metropolitan of the diocese, Ruled as Malankara Metropolitan

Assistant Metropolitan
From	Until	Metropolitan	Notes
15-Jul-2024	Incumbent	Yuhanon Mar Diascoros	Assistant metropolitan

== Parishes ==
- Karapuzha Geevarghese Mar Gregorios Orthodox Church
- Kottayam St Mary's Cheriapally Maha Edavaka
- Kottayam Mar Elia Orthodox Cathedral
- Kummanam St.George Orthodox Church
- Manganam Ebenazar Orthodox Church
- Nattassery St.Thomas Orthodox Church
- Thazathangady Mar Baselios Orthodox Church
