= Diocese of Madras =

Diocese of Madras may refer to:

- Diocese of Madras of the Church of South India
- Madras Orthodox Diocese
- Roman Catholic Archdiocese of Madras and Mylapore
