= Sulthan Bathery Orthodox Diocese =

Diocese of the Malankara Orthodox Syrian Church in India

Diocese of Sulthan Bathery

Orthodox
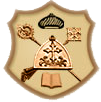
- Catholicate Emblem

Location
- Country: India
- Territory: Wayanad
- Metropolitan: H. G. Geevarghese Mar Barnabas
- Headquarters: Nirmalagiri Aramana, Poomala, S. Bathery P.O, Wayanad- 673 592

Information
- Rite: Malankara Rite
- Established: 1986
- Diocese: Sulthan Bathery Diocese
- Parent church: Malankara Orthodox Syrian Church

Website
- Sulthan Bathery Diocese

Sulthan Batheri Diocese is one of the 32 dioceses of the Malankara Orthodox Syrian Church. The diocese was created in 1986. H. G. Geevarghese Mar Barnabas is the Metropolitan of the diocese. The head office is located in Nirmalagiri Aramana, Poomala, Sulthan Bathery, Wayanad.

== History ==
This diocese was formed in 1986 by organizing churches in Wayand, Kannur and Nilagiri district. It was formerly the part of Malabar Diocese. In the beginning, the diocese was directly under the control of Baselios Marthoma Mathews. Mathai Nooranal became the administrator. In 1991 Kuriakose Clemis became the metropolitan of Diocese. The Headquarters of the dioceses is situated near Kozhikodu- Mysore national Highway. It is 300 m away from Sulthan Bathery town. In 2009, Abraham Ephipanios became the metropolitan. As of 2022, there are 48 churches under the Diocese.

== Parish List ==
- Ambalavayal St.George Orthodox Church
- Ambayathode St.Marys Orthodox Church
- America para St.George Orthodox Church
- Ayyampilly St.Thomas Orthodox Church
- Baderi St.George Orthodox Church
- Charal Mar Gregorios Orthodox Church
- Cheengeri St.Marys Orthodox Church
- Cheeral Mar Behanan Orthodox Church
- Chooralmala St.George Orthodox Church
- Chettiyamparambu St.Marys Orthodox Church
- Cheroot St.Marys Orthodox Church
- Edaveli Mar Gregorios Orthodox Church
- Eralamoola Mar Gregorios Orthodox Church
- Eruthukadavu St.George Orthodox Church
- Gudallor St.Marys Orthodox Church
- Kammana Seenaikkunnu St.George Orthodox Church
- Kammana Tabore St.George Orthodox Church
- Kalpetta St.Marys Orthodox Church
- Kallumukku St.George Orthodox Church
- Karakolly St.Marys Orthodox Church
- Kariyampady St.George Orthodox Church
- Kadalmadu St.Marys Orthodox Church
- Kaniyambatta St.George Orthodox Church
- Kakkayangadu St.Marys Orthodox Church
- Kolithattu Mar Yuhanon Orthodox Church
- Kiliyanthara St.Marys and St.Thomas Orthodox Church
- Kurchermala St.Marys Orthodox Church
- Kelakom St.George Orthodox Valiyapali
- Kelakom St.Thomas Salem Orthodox Church
- Kommery St.George Orthodox Church
- Korome St.Marys Orthodox Church
- Koliyadi St.peters and St.pauls Orthodox Church
- Kolavally St.George Orthodox Church
- Kolagappara St.Thomas Orthodox Church
- Manicode St.Marys Orthodox Church
- Manathavady St.Thomas Orthodox Church
- Malankara Kunnu St.Thomas Orthodox Church
- Meenangady St.Peters Orthodox Valiyapali
- Moolamkavu St.Johns Orthodox Church
- Meppady St.George Orthodox Church
- Ponnuvayal St.Marys Orthodox Church
- Pulpally St.George Orthodox Church
- Santhigiri St.George Orthodox Church
- Sulathan battery St.Mary's Orthodox Cathedral
- Thrikaipatta St.Thomas Orthodox Church
- Thaloor St.Marys Orthodox Church
- Thottamoola Mar Kuriakose Orthodox Church
- Vythiri St.Marys Orthodox Church
- Vadakkanadu St.Thomas Orthodox Church
