= Chengannur Orthodox Diocese =

Diocese of the Malankara Orthodox Syrian Church

Diocese of Chengannur

Orthodox
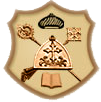
- Catholicate Emblem

Location
- Country: India
- Territory: Chengannur
- Metropolitan: H. G. Mathews Mar Thimotheos
- Headquarters: Bethel Aramana, P.B No 38, Chengannur, Kerala, 689 121

Information
- First holder: Thomas Mar Athanasios
- Rite: Malankara Rite
- Established: 10 March 1985
- Diocese: Chengannur Diocese
- Parent church: Malankara Orthodox Syrian Church

Website
- Chengannur Diocese

Chengannur Diocese is one of the 32 dioceses of Malankara Orthodox Syrian Church. Its headquarters is situated at Bethel Aramana, Chengannur.

== History ==
The Diocese of Chengannur was established on 10 March 1985 with 50 Churches from Thumpamon, Niranam and Kollam Dioceses. It spreads out in Alappuzha and Pathanamthitta districts having 51 churches and 10 chapels.

H.G. Dr Thomas Mar Athanasios Kizhakkethalakkal became the first Metropolitan of the Diocese of Chengannur on 1 August 1985.

In 2018 the then Malankara Metropolitan H.H Baselios Marthoma Paulose II appointed H.G. Dr. Mathews Mar Thimotheos as the assistant metropolitan of the diocese to help Mar Athanasios in his old age. Mar Athanasios died in August 2018.

The diocese came directly under the control of Malankara Metropolitan H.H. Baselios Marthoma Paulose who was assisted by H.G. Dr. Mathews Mar Thimotheos. H.H.Baselios Marthoma Paulose II died in 2021 and H.H. Baselios Marthoma Mathews III was enthroned as the Malankara Metropolitan, also taking charge of Chengannur.

In 2022, H.G. Dr Mathews Mar Thimotheos became the Metropolitan of the diocese of Chengannur.

== Diocesan Metropolitans ==
Chengannur Orthodox Diocesan Metropolitan
From	Until	Metropolitan	Notes
1985	24-Aug-2018	Kizhakkethalakkal H.G. Dr Thomas Mar Athanasios	1st Metropolitan of the diocese
2012	12-Jul-2021	Baselios Marthoma Paulose II Catholicos	2nd Metropolitan of the diocese, Ruled as Malankara Metropolitan
15-Oct-2021	03-Nov-2022	Baselios Marthoma Mathews III Catholicos	3rd Metropolitan of the diocese, Ruled as Malankara Metropolitan
03-Nov-2022	Incumbent	Mathews Mar Thimothios	4th Metropolitan of the diocese

Assistant Metropolitan
From	Until	Metropolitan	Notes
2018	03-Nov-2022	Mathews Mar Thimothios	Assistant metropolitan

== Parish List ==
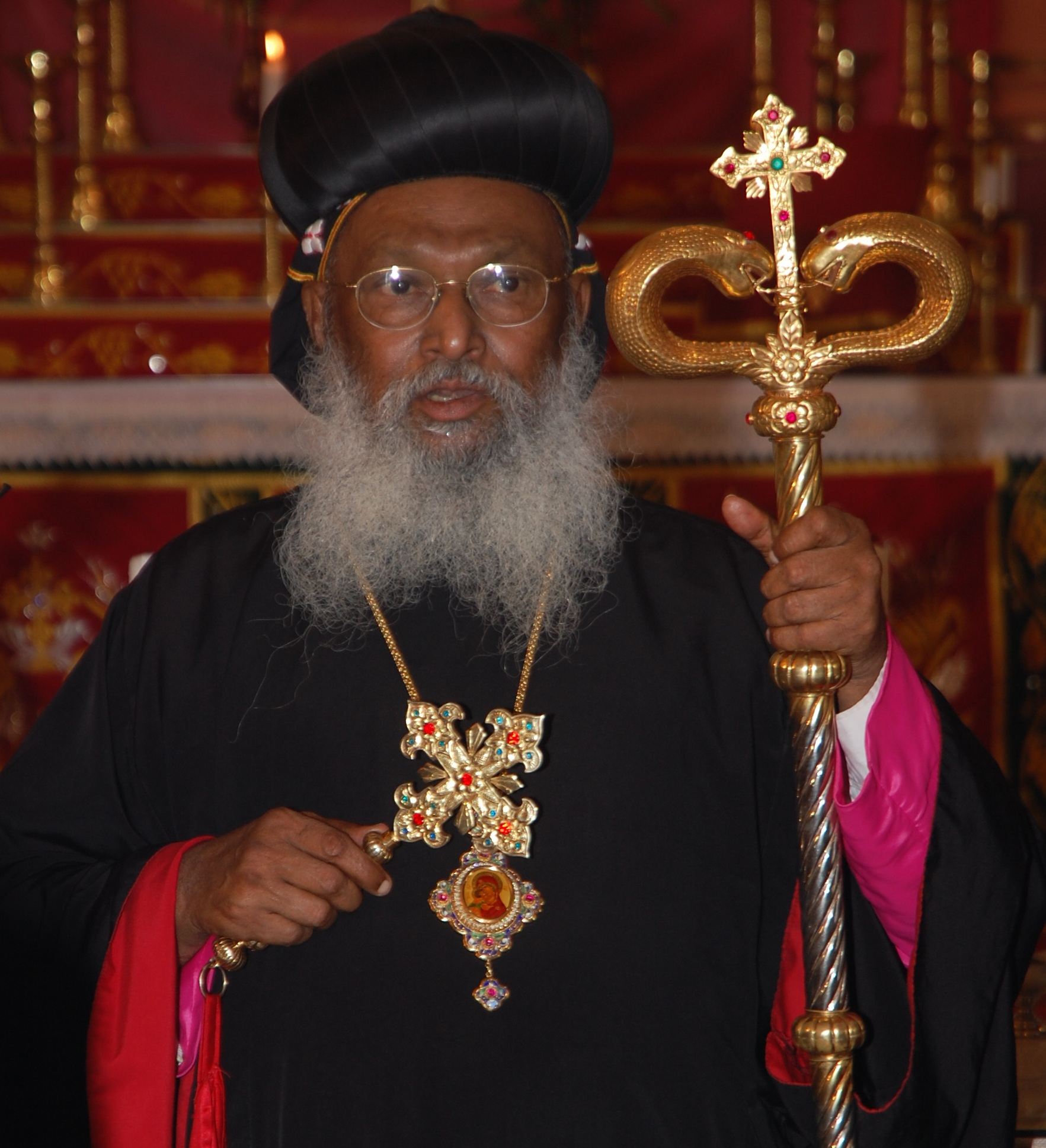
H.G Dr Thomas Mar Athanasios Kizhakkethalakkal

- Ala St.George Orthodox Church
- Arathil St.George Orthodox Maha Edavaka
- Arattupuzha St.Marys Orthodox Church
- Attuva St.Bursouma Orthodox Church
- Budhanoor St.Elias Orthodox Church
- Chengannur Bethel Mar Gregorios Orthodox Aramanapali
- Chengannur St.Ignatious Orthodox Cathedral
- Cherianad St.George Orthodox Church
- Edanad St.Marys Orthodox Church
- Edavankad St.Marys Orthodox Church
- Kadamankulam St.Marys Orthodox Church
- Kallunkal East St.Ignatious Orthodox Church
- Kallunkal West St.George Orthodox Church
- Karakkad Seenaikkunnu St.Marys
- Kodukulanji St.Marys Orthodox Church
- Koorthamala St.Marys Orthodox Church
- Kudassanad St. Stephen's Orthodox Cathedral Pilgrim Centre
- Kurampala St.Thomas Orthodox Church
- Kurichimuttom St.Stephens Orthodox Church
- Kuttamperror St.Marys Orthodox Church
- Kuttor Betaniya Mar Gregorios Orthodox Church
- Mangalam St.George Orthodox Church
- Manthalir St.Thomas Orthodox Church
- Maramon Marthamariam Pazya suriyani Orthodox Pali
- Mezhuveli Holy Innocent Orthodox Church
- Mezhuveli Shalem Orthodox Church
- Mulakkuzha St. Marys Orthodox Church
- Neervilakam Mar Gregorios Orthodox Church
- Nellickal St. Marys Orthodox Church
- Nellimala Mar Gregorios Orthodox Church
- Nooranad St. Thomas Orthodox Church
- Olickal Mar Gregorios Orthodox Church
- Othera St.Marys Orthodox Church
- Pandanad North St.Thomas Orthodox Church
- Pandanad St.Marys Orthodox Church
- Perissery East Mar Gregorios Orthodox Church
- Perissery St.Marys Orthodox Valiyapali
- Piralaseery St.George Orthodox Church
- Poozhikad St.George Orthodox Church
- Puliyoor St.Marys and St.George Orthodox Church
- Pullad St.George Orthodox Church
- Puthencavu St.Marys Orthodox Cathedral
- Thiruvanvandoor St.George Orthodox Church
- Thottapuzha Mar Gregorios Orthodox Church
- Ullannor St.George Orthodox Church
- Ullannor St.Marys Orthodox Church
- Umayattukara St.Thomas Orthodox Church
- Vallamkullam St.Marys Orthodox Church
- Venmony St.Marys Orthodox Church
- Yordanpuram Mar Gregorios Peniel Orthodox Church
- Kozhuvallor St.George Orthodox Church-UDC
