= Thomas Mar Athanasios =

Orthodox bishop

- Church: Malankara Orthodox Syrian Church
- Diocese: Chengannur Orthodox Diocese
- In office: 1990 – 2018

Orders
- Ordination: 15 May 1985 by Baselios Marthoma Mathews I

Personal details
- Born: 3 April 1938 (age 87) Puthencavu, Chengannur, Alappuzha, Kerala

His Grace was born to Mr. K. T. Thomas and Mrs. Aleyamma Thomas on the 3rd of April, 1938 in the Kizhakkethalackal family at Puthencavu, Chengannur, Alappuzha Dist. He was the grandson of Kizhakkethalackal Thoma Kathanar and the nephew of the late Geevarghese Mar Philoxenos (Puthencavil Kochuthirumeni), Thomas Mar Athanasios is Metropolitan of Chengannur Orthodox Diocese of Malankara Orthodox Syrian Church. Termed ended on 2018
