= Malabar Diocese (Malankara Orthodox Syrian Church) =

Diocese of the Malankara Orthodox Syrian Church in India

Coordinates: 11.317972°N 75.945122°E

Diocese of Malabar

Orthodox
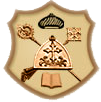
- Catholicate Emblem

Location
- Country: India
- Territory: Malabar
- Metropolitan: H. G. Geevarghese Mar Pachomios
- Headquarters: Mount Hermon, Chathamangalam, N.I.T.Campus P.O, Kozhikode 673 601

Information
- First holder: Pathrose Mar Osthathios
- Rite: Malankara Rite
- Established: 1953
- Diocese: Malabar Diocese
- Parent church: Malankara Orthodox Syrian Church

Website
- Malabar Diocese

The Diocese of Malabar is one of the 32 dioceses of the Malankara Orthodox Syrian Church, with its headquarters at Kozhikode, Kerala, in India.

== History ==
The Malabar Diocese, which covers western districts of Kerala, was formed in 1953. Paulose Mar Sevarios and Pathrose Mar Osthathios (1953–68) have executed its administration at different times. On 11 November 1966, Thomas Mar Timotheos became the diocesan head; he later became Baselios Marthoma Didymus I, Catholicos of the East.

Yuhanon Mar Philoxinos was the bishop in 1995.

Mount Hermon Aramana in Kozhikode is the see, or diocesan headquarters.

Some of the institutions functioning under the aegis of the diocese are the Aravanchal Estate near Payyannur, Krupa Deaddiction Centre at Erumamunda, St Thomas Ashram and Mission Centre at Attapadi, the Parumala Mar Gregorios Orthodox Guidance Center at Chevayur. The diocesan journal Hermon Sandhesam has been published since 1997.

There are 85 parishes in the diocese. HG. Geevarghese Mar Pachomios Metropolitan is the Present Metropolitan of this diocese. Rev. Fr. Kuriakose Peter (Fr. Boby Peter) is the Diocesan Secretary.
