= Geevarghese Barnabas =

Orthodox bishop

Geevarghese Mar Barnabas
- Church: Malankara Orthodox Syrian Church
- Diocese: Sulthan Bathery Orthodox Diocese
- In office: 2022–present

Orders
- Ordination: 28 Jul 2022 by H. H. Moran Mar Baselios Marthoma Mathews III

Personal details
- Born: 10 April 1973 (age 51)

Geevarghese Mar Barnabas is a Metropolitan of the Malankara Orthodox Syrian Church.

== Early life ==
H. G. Geevarghese Mar Barnabas was born on 10 April 1973.

== Metropolitan ==
He was elected as the Metropolitan candidate on 25 February 2022 at the Malankara Association held at Kolenchery. He was consecrated as Metropolitan on 28 July 2022 at St. Mary's Orthodox Cathedral, Pazhanji.
