= Geevarghese Pachomios =

Oriental Orthodox bishop

Geevarghese Mar Pachomios
- Church: Malankara Orthodox Syrian Church
- Diocese: Malabar Diocese
- In office: 2022 – Present

Orders
- Ordination: 28 July 2022 by Baselios Marthoma Mathews III

Personal details
- Born: 6 March 1974 (age 52)

Geevarghese Mar Pachomios is a metropolitan of Malankara Orthodox Syrian Church.

== Early life ==
Geevarghese Pachomios Born in Kochuparambil house as the son of Mr. K.M. Alias and Lt. Mrs. Ommana on 6 th March 1974, H. G. Geevarghese Mar Pachomios Metropolitan belongs to the parish of St. George Church, Mannathoor under the diocese of East Kandanad. His Grace completed his school education from Government High School, Mannathoor. He pursued higher education at St. Peters College, Kolencherry and Symbiosis Law college, Pune. Further, he joined Kottayam Old Seminary and completed BD (2003–08) and M.Th from Paurasthya Vidyapeedam, Vadavathoor(2019–21). He was ordained sub-deaconship, by H.G. Dr. Thomas Mar Athanasios Metropolitan at St. Thomas Cathedral, Muvattupuzha on 31 st January 2001 . He was ordained deacon on 30 th October 2009, and priesthood on 11 th December, and became Ramban on 14 th December. H. G. was chosen as a Metropolitan in the Malankara Syrian Christian Association held at Kolencherry on 25 th February 2022. He was ordained as a Metropolitan by the name ‘Geevarghese Mar Pachomios’ by H.H. Baselios Mar Thoma Mathews III Catholicos at St. Mary’s Cathedral, Pazhanji on 28 th July 2022. H.G. has taken charge of Malabar diocese as Metropolitan since 3 rd November 2022

== Metropolitan ==
He was elected as the metropolitan candidate on 25 February 2022 at the Malankara Association held at Kolenchery. He was consecrated as Metropolitan on 28 July 2022 at St. Mary's Orthodox Cathedral, Pazhanji.
