= Geevarghese Philexinos =

Orthodox bishop

Geevarghese Mar Philexinos
- Church: Malankara Orthodox Syrian Church
- Diocese: Madras Orthodox Diocese
- In office: 2022 – Present

Orders
- Ordination: 28 Jul 2022 by H. H. Moran Mar Baselios Marthoma Mathews III

Personal details
- Born: 30 May 1972 (age 52)

Geevarghese Mar Philexinos is a Metropolitan of the Malankara Orthodox Syrian Church.

== Early life ==
H. G. Geevarghese Mar Philexinos was born on 30 May 1972.

== Metropolitan ==
He was elected as the Metropolitan candidate on 25 February 2022 at the Malankara Association held at Kolenchery. He was consecrated as Metropolitan on 28 July 2022 at St. Mary's Orthodox Cathedral, Pazhanji.
