= Erumamunda =

Village in Kerala, India

- Village
- Location in Kerala, India Erumamunda (India)
- Coordinates: 11°21′0″N 76°13′0″E
- Country: India
- State: Kerala
- District: Malappuram

Languages
  - Official: Malayalam, English
- Time zone: UTC+5:30 (IST)
- PIN: 679334
- Vehicle registration: KL-10

Erumamunda is a small village located near Nilambur in Malappuram district of the Indian state of Kerala. It is situated in Chungathara Grama Panchayat. Erumamunda includes the 1st and 20th ward of Chungathara Panchayath. It is situated on the banks of Chaliyar River and western ghats.

== Economy ==
Rubber and latex-related industries are the main industries, with 70% of the local people directly or indirectly working with rubber products. The rest of the population either work abroad, in government jobs, or in other professions.

== Education ==
Nirmala Higher Secondary School is a higher secondary school.

== Amenities ==
Adyan Para waterfalls are a known picnic spot.

== Culture ==
Erumamunda has nearly equal numbers of Muslim, Hindu and Christians. The culture attempts to rise above religious traditions. Thiruvathira, Duff Muttu, Kolkali, Margamkali and Aravanamuttu are common folk arts.

== Transport ==
Erumamunda village connects to other parts of Malappuram.

=== Road ===
The main roads are Adiyanpara - Kaippini - Chungathara Road (AC Road), Akampadam - Pathar Road, Vellimuttam - Kurumbalangode Road, Pulikakkadu Road, Chempankolly - Matha Road. Kallayipara Road etc.

=== Rail ===
The nearest railway station is Nilambur Road Railway station, operating trains between Nilambur and Thiruvananthapuram, Palakkad, Shoranur, Kottayam, Cochin, and Thrissur.

=== Air ===
The nearest airport is Calicut International Airport, Malappuram, 50Km away.

=== Road ===
The nearest state highway is Gudallur - Nilambur - Kozhikode Road is 9 Km away. The nearest National Highway is Feroke - Malappuram - Palakkad Highway passing through Malappuram
