= Madras Orthodox Diocese =

Diocese of Madras

Orthodox
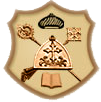
- Catholicate Emblem

Location
- Country: India
- Territory: Tamilnadu, Andaman Nicobar and Sri Lanka
- Metropolitan: H. G. Geevarghese Mar Philoxenos
- Headquarters: Rajeswari Street, Mehta Nagar, Chennai - 600 029

Information
- First holder: Zachariah Mar Dionysius
- Rite: Malankara Rite
- Established: 1979
- Diocese: Madras Diocese
- Parent church: Malankara Orthodox Syrian Church

Website
- Madras Diocese

The Diocese of Madras is one of the 32 dioceses of the Indian Orthodox Church with its headquarters at Chennai.

== History ==
H.G Kayalath Dr. Stephanos Mar Theodosius was the first Diocesan Metropolitan. He became the Metropolitan of the newly formed Calcutta diocese in 1979 which was bifurcated from the diocese.

== Today ==
The present diocese was formed on 1979 and the Diocesan Metropolitan was the late H.G. Zachariah Mar Dionysius. Diocese of Madras includes the territorial area of Tamil Nadu, and Andaman Islands in India, and Sri Lanka

Since the demise of H.G. Mar Dionysius in 1997, H.G. Dr. Yakob Mar Irenaios Metropolitan led the diocese. The Diocese celebrated its Silver Jubilee in 2004 and launched several charitable and social development programmes. Territorial and institutional growth caused the Diocese to be divided into three Madras, Bangalore and Brahmavar Dioceses. The diocese has 64 independent parishes and many more congregations including 9 cathedrals. Sixty-five priests serve the parishioners, including 6 Cor-episcopas, 1 Cor-episcopa ramban, 4 rambans, and 4 retirees.

The diocese has a charitable institution called Snehabhavan, which is a guidance centre for patients undergoing treatment in Christian Medical College, Vellore.

This diocese includes non-Malayalee communities consisting of Tamil Christians with Tamil Priests, worshiping in Tamil language in Salem, Dindigul and Sri Lanka. The diocese also runs 2 guesthouses in Chennai city for youngsters who came to study as well as work.

== Diocesan Metropolitan ==
Diocesan Metropolitan
From	Until	Metropolitan	Notes
1979	1997	H.G. Zachariah Mar Dionysius	Entombed at Mount Tabor Chapel, Pathanapuram
1997	2009	H.G. Dr. Yakob Mar Irenaios	Transferred to Kochi Diocese
2009	2022	H.G. Dr. Yuhanon Mar Dioscoros	Transferred to Kottayam Diocese
2022	Present	H.G Geevarghese Mar Philexinos	

== List of parishes in India ==
=== Andaman Nicobar ===
- St. Mary's Orthodox Cathedral, Port Blair, Andamans, India
- St. Thomas Orthodox Church, Bettapur, Andamans, India
- St. Mary's Orthodox Church, Diglipur, Andamans, India
- St. Gregorios Orthodox Church, Mannarghat, Andamans, India
- St. George Orthodox Church, Mayabunder, Andamans, India
- St. Gregorios Orthodox Church, Rangat, Andamans, India
- St. Dionysius Orthodox Church, Kadamthala, Andamans, India

=== Tamilnadu ===
- St. Mary's Orthodox Cathedral, Coimbatore, India
- St. Mary's Orthodox Church, Coonoor, India
- St. George Orthodox Church, Avadi, Chennai, India
- St. George Orthodox Church, Ramalingapuram, Chennai, India
- St. Thomas Orthodox Cathedral, Broadway, Chennai, India
- St. Mary's Orthodox Church, Chetpet, Chennai, India
- St. Mary's Orthodox Church, Injambakkam, Chennai, India
- St. Peter's & St. Paul's Orthodox Church, Koyembedu, Chennai, India
- St. George Orthodox Church, Padi, Chennai, India
- St. Gregorios Orthodox Church, Perambur, Chennai, India
- St. Thomas Mount Orthodox Church, Puzhuthivakkam, Chennai, India
- Mar Gregorios Orthodox Church, Tambaram, Chennai, India
- St. Mary's Orthodox Church, Tiruvottiyur, Chennai, India
- St. Thomas Orthodox Church, Madurai, India
- St. Gregorios Orthodox Church, Mettupalayam, India
- St. Thomas Orthodox Church, Neyveli, India
- St. Mary's Orthodox Church, Pollachi, India
- St. Antony's Orthodox Church, Pondichery, India
- St. Gregorios Orthodox Church, Salem, India
- St. Mary's Orthodox Church, Tirupur, India
- St. Thomas Orthodox Church, Tiruchirapalli, India
- St. Mary's Orthodox Church, Thiruvarambur, India
- St. Gregorios Orthodox Church, Tuticorin, India
- St. Peter's Orthodox Church, Valparai, India
- St. Luke's Orthodox Church, Vellore, India
- Alvarez Mar Julius Orthodox center, Dindigul
- St John's Orthodox Tamil Church, Erode

== Parishes in Srilanka ==
- St Thomas Orthodox Church, Jayapurm North, Kilinochi
