= Mathews Thimothios (Malankara bishop) =

Indian Indian orthodox bishop (born 1963)

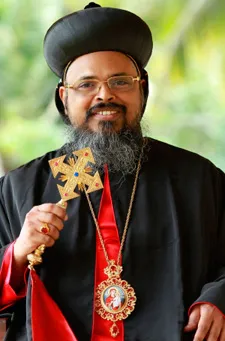
- Church: Malankara Orthodox Syrian Church
- Diocese: Chengannur Orthodox Diocese
- In office: 2009 – Present
- Predecessor: Thomas Makarios

Orders
- Ordination: 19 February 2009 by Baselios Thoma Didymos I

Personal details
- Born: 3 May 1963 (age 62) Mavelikara, Kerala

Mathews Thimothios is the Metropolitan of the Chengannur Orthodox Diocese of the Malankara Orthodox Syrian Church.

== Childhood and education ==
Mathews Thimothios was born on 3 May 1963 as the eldest son of Mr P. J. Baby and his wife Thankamma Baby of Painuvilla Puthenveettil. He is a member of St. Mary's Cathedral Puthiakavu, Mavelikkara. He took his degree as a student of Bishop Moore College Mavelikkara, G. S. T. from Orthodox Theological Seminary and B. D and M.Th. from Serampore University. He also attained the Licentiate in sacred scripture from the Pontifical Institute in Rome and Diploma in Biblical Archeology from the Pontifical Bible Institute in Jerusalem. He was awarded a doctoral degree from the Pontifical University of Saint Thomas Aquinas, Rome. He speaks Italian, French, German, Aramaic, Hebrew, English, and Malayalam.

== Priestly life ==
Thimothios has served in many key positions including the Joint Secretary of St. Thomas Orthodox Vaidika Sanghum, Publisher of the Purohithan quarterly, Secretary of the Vattasseril Mar Dionysius Charitable Fund, Dean of Post Graduate Studies-FFRRC, Member of the Board of Studies for Old Testament, Serampore University, Member of the Bible Translation Committee-Bible Society, Kerala, Registrar of Orthodox Theological Seminary, Kottayam.

His priestly ministry is spread over 18 years and has served as Assistance. Vicar and Vicar in 8 parishes under the jurisdiction of three dioceses, namely Kollam, Kottayam and Mavelikara. He has published several books including OVBS text books, Teacher's Guide etc. and an exegetical study of Psalm 24 which was published in Rome.

Parish Served

St. George Orthodox Syrian Church Kannanakuzhy - Mavelikara Diocese from Feb 2008- Oct 2008

== Metropolitan of UK, Europe and Africa Diocese ==
The Malankara Syrian Christian Association met on 11 September 2008 at Pampakuda elected him as the bishop along with six others. On 4 December 2008 Baselios Mar Thoma Didymos I received his profession as Ramban. On 19 February 2009 he was ordained to the episcopate by Baselios Mar Thoma Didymos I at St. George Orthodox Church, Puthuppally.

== Metropolitan of Chengannur Diocese ==
As of 2022, he is serving as Metropolitan of Chengannur Orthodox Diocese.
