= Baselios Marthoma Mathews III =

Malankara Orthodox Syrian Metropolitan (born 1949)

His Holiness Moran Mar Baselios Marthoma Mathews III ܒܣܝܠܝܘܣ ܡܪܬܘܡܐ ܡܬܝܘܣ ܬܠܝܬܝܐ
- Catholicos of the East and Malankara Metropolitan
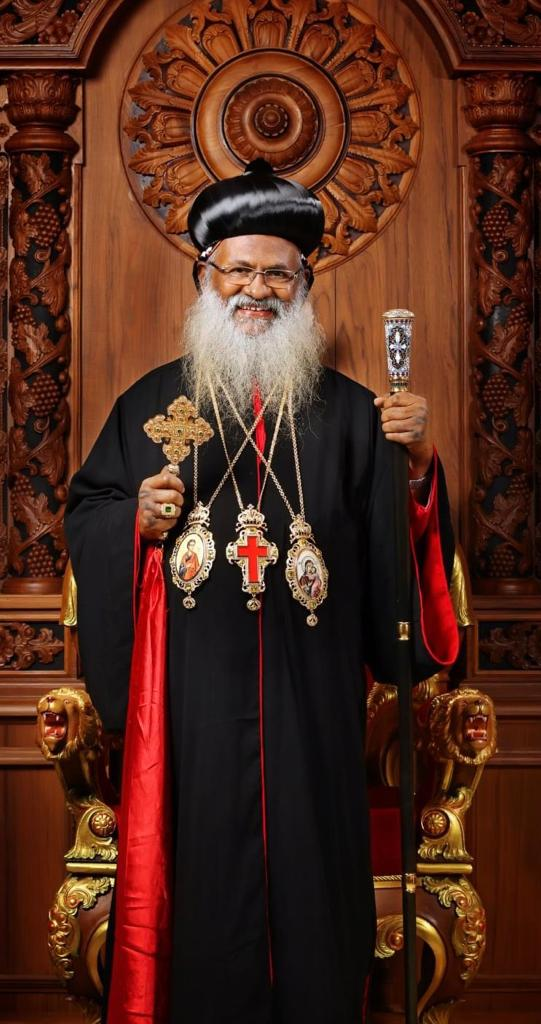
- Marthoma Mathews III in 2021
- Native name: ബസേലിയോസ്‌ മാർത്തോമാ മാത്യൂസ് തൃതീയൻ
- Church: Malankara Orthodox Syrian Church
- See: The Holy Apostolic Throne of St Thomas
- Elected: 14 October 2021
- Installed: 15 October 2021
- Predecessor: Baselios Marthoma Paulose II

Personal details
- Born: 12 February 1949 (age 77) Vazhoor, Kottayam, Kerala
- Education: Kerala University; Serampore College; Leningrad Theological Seminary; Pontifical Oriental Institute

Baselios Marthoma Mathews III (Syriac: ܒܣܝܠܝܘܣ ܡܪܬܘܡܐ ܡܬܝܘܣ ܬܠܝܬܝܐ), born 12 February 1949 is the present Catholicos of the East and Malankara Metropolitan of the Malankara Church, serving as its primate. He was enthroned as the 22nd Malankara Metropolitan on 14 October 2021 and as the 9th Catholicos on 15 October 2021 at St. Peter and St. Paul's Church, Parumala, succeeding Baselios Marthoma Paulose II.

== Early life and education ==
Mathews was born on 12 February 1949 to Cherian Anthrayos of Mattathil family in Vazhoor. He studied Chemistry at Kerala University and Theology at Orthodox Theological Seminary, Kottayam and Senate of Serampore College. He procured his Master's degree from Leningrad Theological Seminary and Doctorate in Oriental theology from Pontifical Oriental Institute at Rome, where he specialized in the Christology of Philoxenos of Mabbug of the West Syriac tradition.

== Ministry ==
=== Priesthood ===
He was ordained as a deacon in 1976 and then as a priest in 1978 by Baselios Mathews I. On 30 April 1991 he was consecrated to the order of Episcopos. In 1994, he was consecrated as a metropolitan of the Diocese of Kandanad West. He has also served as the assistant metropolitan of the Diocese of Idukki and is currently serving as the Metropolitan of Idukki since 2019.

He has been a teacher at Orthodox Theological Seminary, Kottayam, since 1984. He has taught Christology in the graduate and post-graduate levels while guiding a number of doctoral theses. He has authored several scholarly books and articles in the field of Theology. He has also served as the Executive Secretary to the Holy Episcopal Synod. The Holy Episcopal synod held at Devalokam Aramana nominated him as the successor to the Catholicos of the East & Malankara Metropolitan on 16 September 2021.

He has organized several charitable projects at the diocesan level. Mar Pachomios Charitable Society, formed in the memory of his predecessor Joseph Mar Pachomios, Metropolitan of Kandanad, runs over a dozen charitable projects including; Pratheeksha Bhavan, Prasanthi Bhavan, Prathyasa Bhavan, Pradanam Centre, Pramodam Project, Prasannam Bhavan, Prakasam Institute of Special Education and Prathibha Products.

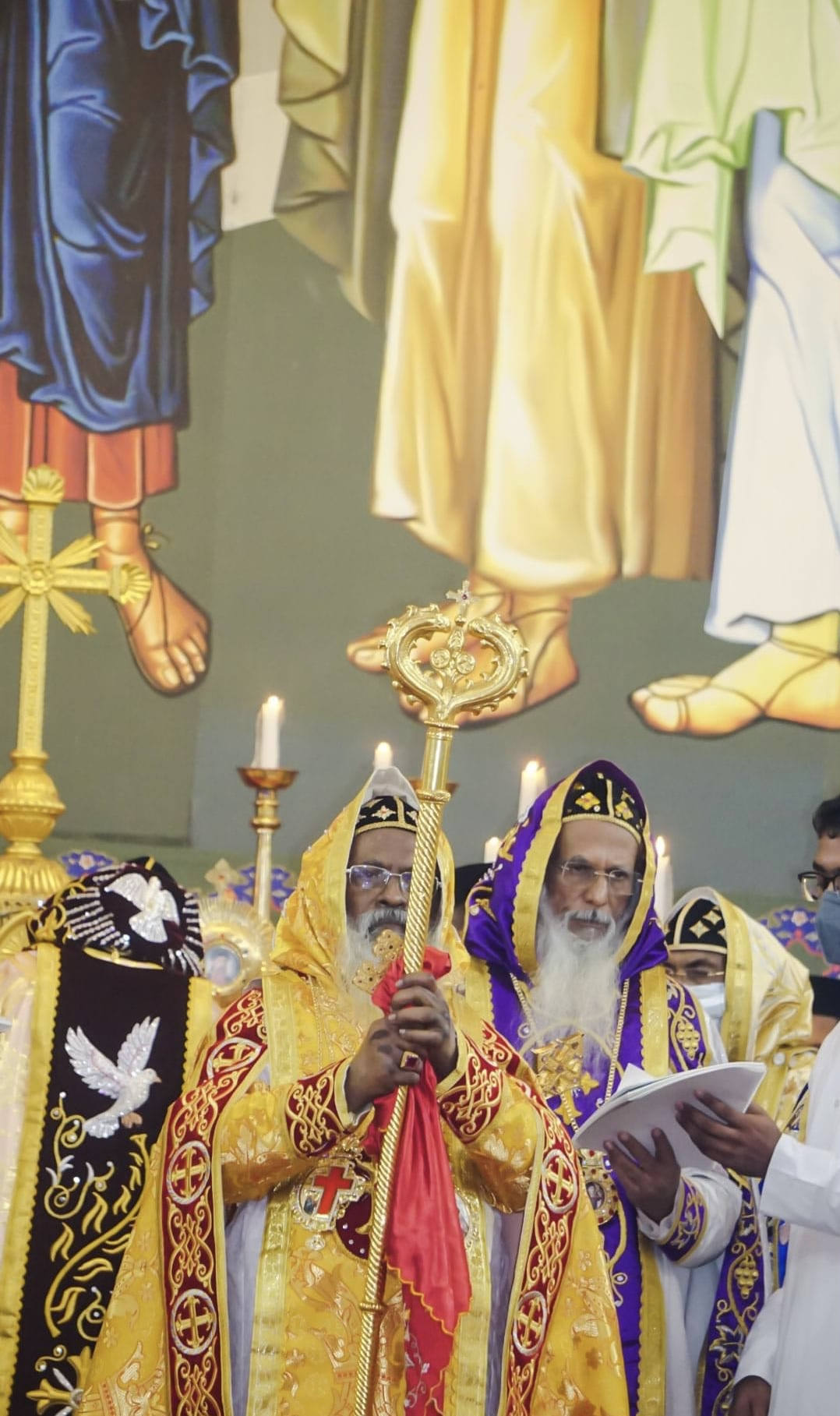

=== Catholicos of the East and Malankara Metropolitan ===
In October 2021, the Holy Synod and Managing committee designated him as the new Malankara Metropolitan and Catholicos of Malankara Church, succeeding Baselios Marthoma Paulose II, who died in July 2021. He was enthroned as the 22nd Malankara Metropolitan during the Malankara Association that took place on 14 October 2021 at St. Peter and St. Paul's Church, Parumala. He was enthroned as Catholicos of the Apostolic Throne of Saint Thomas on 15 October 2021 by the Holy Synod of Malankara Church. The chief celebrant of the enthronement service and Holy Eucharist was Kuriakose Mar Clemis who is the senior metropolitan of Malankara Orthodox Syrian Church.

Cardinal Mar George Alenchery inaugurated a meeting held to congratulate the new head of the church. Panakkad Syed Sadiq Ali Shihab Thangal, Cardinal Mar Cleemis, Suffragan Metropolitan Euyakim Mar Coorilos, Bishop Selvister Ponnumuthan, Bishop Awgin Kuriakose, Yuhanon Mar Diascoros Metropolitan, minister V N Vasavan, among others spoke during the meeting. Felicitation letters from Patriarch Kirill, the supreme head of Russian Orthodox Church, and other International Ecumenical heads was also read on the occasion. Fr Alexander Kurien also conveyed wishes from the US President Joe Biden and presented a memento from the White House.

==== Episcopal Consecrations ====
Mathews III consecrated seven metropolitan bishops at St. Mary’s Orthodox Cathedral, Pazhanji on 28 July 2022. The metropolitans are Abraham Stephanos, Thomas Ivanios, Geevarghese Theophilos, Geevarghese Philexinos, Geevarghese Pachomios, Geevarghese Barnabas and Zacharias Severios.

==== Consecration of Holy Chrism ====
On 27 March 2026, the Chrism (the anointing oil known as Myron/Mooron) was consecrated by Mathews III at the Catholicate Aramana Chapel. The ceremony was concelebrated by the metropolitans of the Episcopal Synod along with visiting archbishops from the Ethiopian Orthodox Tewahedo Church and the Eritrean Orthodox Tewahedo Church, and attended by the Russian Orthodox Church.

== International Visits and Ecumenical Meetings ==
Since his enthronement in 2021, Baselios Marthoma Mathews III has expanded the international presence of the Malankara Orthodox Syrian Church through high-level visits to major Christian centers and bilateral dialogues.

=== The Holy See (Vatican) ===
- Official Visit (September 2023): Mathews III conducted his first official visit to the Vatican to meet with Pope Francis, marking the 40th anniversary of the first visit of a Malankara Catholicos to Rome. During the visit, he prayed at the tomb of St. Peter and discussed "pastoral ecumenism," focusing on sacramental cooperation and joint care for the diaspora faithful. He also participated in sessions at the General Secretariat of the Synod, where the Malankara Church's synodal experience was shared.

=== The Coptic Orthodox Church (Egypt) ===
- Cairo Summit (November 2025): The Catholicos visited Egypt for an official meeting with Pope Tawadros II at the Papal Residence in Cairo. The leaders discussed strengthening ties between the two sister Oriental Orthodox Churches. Mathews III voiced concern regarding the humanitarian crisis affecting Orthodox Christians in Ethiopia and updated the Coptic Pope on the legal status of the Malankara Church dispute in India.

=== The Russian Orthodox Church ===
- Official Visit to Russia (September 2023): From 3 to 8 September 2023, Mathews III undertook a historic official visit to Russia, visiting Moscow and Saint Petersburg. During the visit, he held formal negotiations with Patriarch Kirill of Moscow at the Danilov Monastery. The leaders, who shared a personal connection from Mathews III's time as a student at the Leningrad Theological Academy (where Kirill was then rector), discussed expanding academic exchanges, monastic cooperation, and humanitarian projects.
- State Recognition: On 12 December 2024, the Russian Ambassador to India, Denis Alipov, bestowed the Order of Friendship upon Mathews III on behalf of the Russian Federation. The award recognized his efforts in developing inter-church dialogue and his philanthropic contributions through the St. Alexis Clinical Hospital cooperation.

=== Commemoration of the Council of Nicaea (1700th Anniversary) ===
- Prayer at Iznik (November 2025): To mark the 1700th anniversary of the First Council of Nicaea, Mathews III participated in an ecumenical prayer service in İznik, Turkey. In a historic moment for the Malankara Church, he offered prayers in Malayalam on the site where the Nicene Creed was formulated in 325 AD. The event was held in the presence of Patriarch Bartholomew I of Constantinople and other global Christian leaders.

== Works ==
- നിത്യജീവനിൽ (In Eternal Life)
- എഫേസ്യ, ഫിലിപ്പൃ, കൊലോസ്യ ലേഖനങ്ങൾ: ഒരു വ്യാഖ്യാനം (Epistle(s) to the Ephesians, Philippians, and Colossians: an Interpretation)
- പൗരസ്ത്യ വേദശാസ്ത്ര ദർശനങ്ങൾ (Oriental Theological Perspectives)
- പൗരസ്ത്യ സഭാശാസ്ത്ര ദർശനങ്ങൾ (Oriental Ecclesiological Perspectives)
- Word Became Flesh: The Christology of Philoxenos of Mabbug
- Didaskalia: Church, Worship, and Unity
- മലങ്കരസഭ: ചരിത്രസ്‌പന്ദനങ്ങൾ (The Malankara Church: Historical Pulses)

=== Anthologies ===
- കാലത്തിന്റെ കാതോലിക്കാശബ്ദം (Catholicos Voice of the Age)

=== Festschrifts ===
- Begotten, Not Made

This collection of essays on Christology was published in 2017 by the colleagues and students of Mar Severios at the Seminary to mark the 25th year of his Episcopal consecration.

== Distinctions ==
The official form of address of the Catholicos is Catholicos of the East and Malankara Metropolitan enthroned on the Apostolic Throne of St. Thomas.

=== Orders ===
- Order of Glory and Honor from Russian Orthodox Church on 2 November 2024.
- Order of Friendship from Russian Federation on 12 December 2024.

=== Honorary Doctorates ===
- In 2022, he was given an honorary degree from Saint Vladimir's Orthodox Theological Seminary in Yonkers, New York.
- On 7 September 2023, St. Petersburg Theological Academy (formerly known as the Leningrad Theological Academy while he was a student there in the 1970s) awarded him an honorary doctorate.

== Notes ==
Oriental Orthodox titles
Preceded by Baselios Marthoma Paulose II; 2010–2021	Catholicos of the East & Malankara Metropolitan; 2021–present	Incumbent
