= Malankara Orthodox Syrian Church =

Oriental Orthodox Christian church

Malankara Orthodox Syrian Church
- മലങ്കര ഓർത്തഡോക്സ് സുറിയാനി സഭ ܥܕܬܐ ܡܠܢܟܪܝܬܐ ܣܘܪܝܝܬܐ ܐܘܪܬܘܕܟܣܝܬܐ ܕܗܢܕܘ
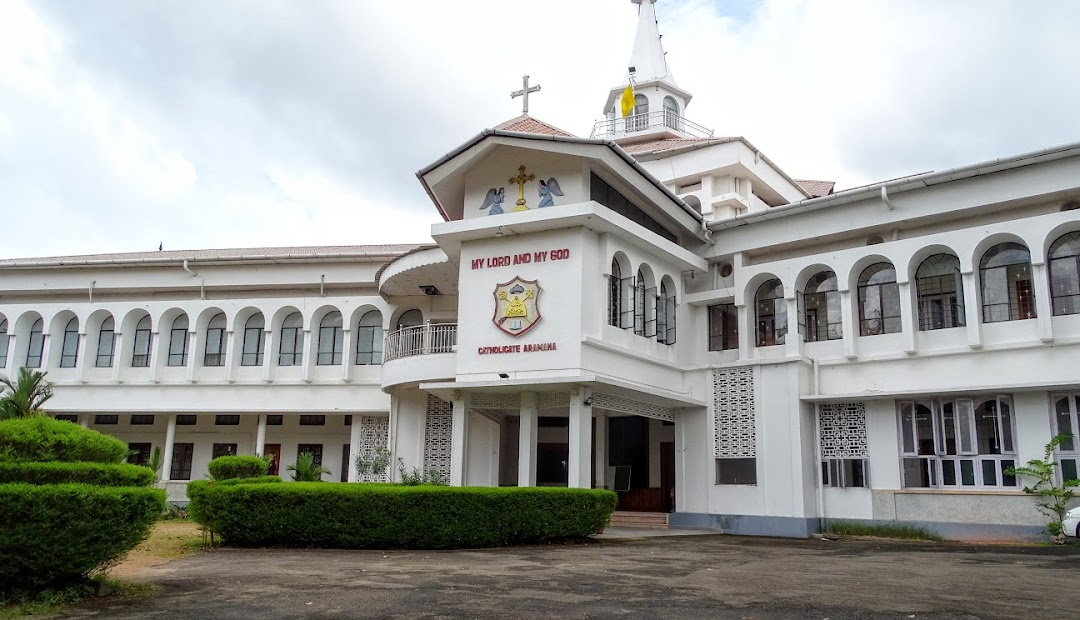
- Catholicate Palace
- Type: Autocephaly
- Classification: Christian
- Orientation: Oriental Orthodox; Syriac
- Scripture: Peshitta
- Theology: Oriental Orthodox
- Polity: Episcopal
- Governance: Episcopal Synod
- Catholicos: Baselios Marthoma Mathews III
- Region: India and the Nasrani diaspora
- Language: Syriac, Malayalam, Konkani, Hindi, English, Tamil and other Indian regional languages
- Liturgy: West Syriac Rite (Malankara Rite)
- Headquarters: Catholicate Palace, Kottayam, Kerala, India
- Founder: Thomas the Apostle (according to tradition); Dionysius VI
- Origin: c. 52 AD (Saint Thomas Christianity, by tradition), 1912 (Establishment of Catholicate)
- Independence: 1912 (Separation from the Syriac Orthodox Church)
- Separated from: Syriac Orthodox Church
- Branched from: Saint Thomas Christians, Malankara Church
- Separations: Syro-Malankara Catholic Church (1930),
- Other names: ഇന്ത്യൻ ഓർത്തഡോക്സ് സഭ (Indian Orthodox Church) മലങ്കര സഭ (Malankara Church)
- Official website: mosc.in

The Malankara Orthodox Syrian Church (MOSC) (Syriac: ܥܕܬܐ ܡܠܢܟܪܝܬܐ ܣܘܪܝܝܬܐ ܐܘܪܬܘܕܟܣܝܬܐ ܕܗܢܕܘ) also known as the Indian Orthodox Church (IOC) or simply as the Malankara Church, is an autocephalous Oriental Orthodox Church headquartered in Devalokam, near Kottayam, India. It serves India's Saint Thomas Christian (also known as Nasrani) population. According to tradition, these communities originated in the missions of Thomas the Apostle in the 1st century (circa 52 AD). It employs the Malankara Rite, an Indian form of the West Syriac liturgical rite.

The Malankara Orthodox Syrian Church traces its origin back to the historic Malankara Church and its association with the Syriac Orthodox Church. Between 1909 and 1912, differences regarding the extent of authority of the patriarch of Antioch led to a division within the Malankara Church. As a result, two ecclesiastical bodies emerged: the Malankara Orthodox Syrian Church (MOSC) and the Jacobite Syrian Christian Church (JSCC), both of which claim continuity with the Malankara Christian tradition.

Since 1912 the MOSC has maintained the office of the Catholicos of the East, who also holds the title of Malankara Metropolitan. The current catholicos and Malankara metropolitan is Baselios Marthoma Mathews III, who serves as the primate of the church. In 1934 the MOSC adopted a constitution to systematise the function and administration of the church. It defined the conditional authority of the patriarch of Antioch, and vested the powers of temporal and spiritual administration in the supreme hierarch who possesses the offices of the catholicate and the Malankara metropolitanate.

The Malankara Orthodox Syrian Church is in communion with the other Oriental Orthodox Churches. Despite multiple efforts toward reconciliation, disputes between the MOSC and the JSCC, primarily concerning ecclesiastical authority and administrative matters, have continued, including legal proceedings and local conflicts.

The Malankara Orthodox Syrian Church accepts miaphysitism, (not to be confused with monophysitism), which holds that in the one person of Jesus Christ, divinity and humanity are united in one (μία, mia) nature (φύσις, physis) without separation, without confusion, without alteration, and without mixing, where Christ is consubstantial with God the Father. Around 500 bishops within the patriarchates of Alexandria, Antioch and Jerusalem refused to accept the dyophysite doctrine of two natures decreed by the fourth ecumenical council, the Council of Chalcedon in 451, an incident that resulted in the second major split in the main body of the Christian Church (after the Nestorian schism). While the Oriental Orthodox Churches rejected the Chalcedonian definition, the sees that would later become the Catholic Church and the Eastern Orthodox Church accepted this council.

Self-reporting roughly 2.5 million members (with external estimates of roughly 1 million) across 32 dioceses worldwide, a significant proportion of the Malankara Orthodox Syrian Church's adherents reside in the southern India state of Kerala, with Malankara communities in North America, Europe, the Middle East, Malaysia, Singapore, Sri Lanka, South America, Australia, and New Zealand. The Encyclopedia of Christianity Online estimated the church has approximately 1.2 million members.

== History ==
=== Early history ===
Chronological diagram of Saint Thomas Christian denominations

According to tradition, Christianity first arrived in India with Thomas the Apostle during the 1st century AD, evolving into Saint Thomas Christianity over several centuries. While isolated and generally independent in administration, Indian Christians maintained contact with the Christian hierarchies of Antioch, Persia, and potentially Alexandria. The Saint Thomas Christians had relationships with the Persian Church of the East from at least the 6th century onward. The Indians inherited its East Syriac dialect for liturgical use and gradually became Syriac Christians in ritual and doctrine. They received clerical support from Persian bishops, who traveled to Kerala in merchant ships on the spice route. For much of this period, Saint Thomas Christians were under the leadership of an archdeacon (a native ecclesiastical head with temporal powers, deriving from the Greek arkhidiākonos).

During the 16th century, efforts by the Portuguese Padroado–an arm of the Catholic Church–to bring the Saint Thomas Christians under the administration of the Latin Church and attempts to Latinize the Malankara Rite led to the first of several rifts in the community. These divisions intensified following the 1599 Synod of Diamper. Saint Thomas Christians who were opposed to the Portuguese Padroado missionaries took the Coonan Cross Oath on 3 January 1653. The Dutch East India Company expulsion of the Portuguese from much of Malabar enabled the reconciliation of some Saint Thomas Christians and the Catholic Church, with this group eventually evolving into the Syro-Malabar Catholic Church, an Eastern Catholic church that adopted the Chaldean Catholic Church's East Syrian Rite and dyophysite Christology.

=== Malankara Church ===
Many Saint Thomas Christian chose to remain independent from the Catholic Church. Patriarch Gregorios Abdal Jaleel, the Syriac Orthodox Archbishop of Jerusalem, witnessed the 1665 ordination of Thomas as Bishop Thoma I, who forged a renewed relationship with the Syriac Orthodox Church of Antioch and Saint Thomas Christians, which laid the foundation for adopting the West Syrian Rite and practices over the next two centuries. Those who supported the indigenous church leader of Malankara, Thoma I, and adopted West Syrian liturgies and practices and miaphysite faith evolved into the Malankara Church.

=== 19th and 20th centuries ===
The Arthat Padiyola declared that the administration of Arthat Church was independent and the bishops from Rome, Antioch, and Babylon had no role in the Malankara Church hierarchy, despite continued efforts to integrate the remaining independent Saint Thomas Christians into these patriarchates. In 1807, four gospels of Holy Bible in Syriac were translated to Malayalam by Kayamkulam Philipose Ramban. The Malankara Orthodox Theological Seminary in Kottayam was established in 1815 under the leadership of Pulikottil Ittup Ramban (Mar Dionysius II). The Mavelikara Synod (Padiyola), led by Cheppad Mar Dionysius, rejected the suggestions put forward by Anglican missioneries and Reformation group and declared the beliefs and theology of Malankara Church were same as the Syriac Orthodox Church of Antioch.

Geevarghese Dionysius of Vattasseril, who became the Malankara metropolitan bishop in 1908, played a significant role with the other clerical and lay leaders of Malankara in re-establishing the Catholicate of the East in India in 1912. Relations with the Syriac Orthodox Church soured in 1909, as Patriarch Ignatius Abded Aloho II, after arriving in India, claimed temporal jurisdiction over the church. Dionysius rejected the request, leading to the patriarch issuing an encyclical deposing him, and thus emerged two factions in the church. The faction that supported the patriarch came to be called as Bava Kakshi ("Patriarch Faction") and the one that supported the Malankara Metropolitan came to be known as Methran Kakshi ("Metropolitan Faction"). The Malankara Orthodox Syrian Church, wishing to retain its autocephaly, appealed to emeritus Patriarch Ignatius Abdul Masih II, who—according to later Syriac Orthodox sources—was deposed by a Synod in 1903. He enthroned Murimattathil Paulose Ivanios as Baselios Paulose I, Catholicos of the East, on the Throne of St. Thomas at St. Mary's Church in Niranam on 15 September 1912.

In 1934 the Malankara Church adopted a constitution to regulate its administration, parishes, and institutions. In 1947 Saint Gregorios of Parumala was declared as a saint by the church. In 1952 the official residence of the Malankara Metropolitan and the headquarters of Malankara Church were shifted to Devalokam from Old Seminary. In 1958 the Supreme Court declared Catholicos Baselios Geevarghese II as the legitimate Malankara Metropolitan, and the two factions of the Malankara Orthodox Church rejoined. In 1964 the Syriac Orthodox patriarch of Antioch participated in the enthronement ceremony of the catholicos and Malankara Metropolitan, Baselios Augen I. In 1995 the Supreme Court of India declared the MOSC constitution adopted in 1934 valid.

=== 21st century ===
In 2002 fresh elections were conducted in Malankara Association under the observation of Supreme Court of India. The Supreme Court declared Catholicos Baselios Marthoma Mathews II as the official and legitimate Malankara Metropolitan and also declared that this decision cannot be disputed in any platform. In 2003 Vattasheril Dionysius VI was canonised as a saint. In 2012, the centennial of the establishment of the church and catholicate were celebrated with history classes and church publications. On 3 July 2017 a major verdict by the Supreme Court of India declared the MOSC legally applicable to all parishes in disputed possession between the MOSC and Jacobite Syrian Christian Church.

== Hierarchy and doctrine ==
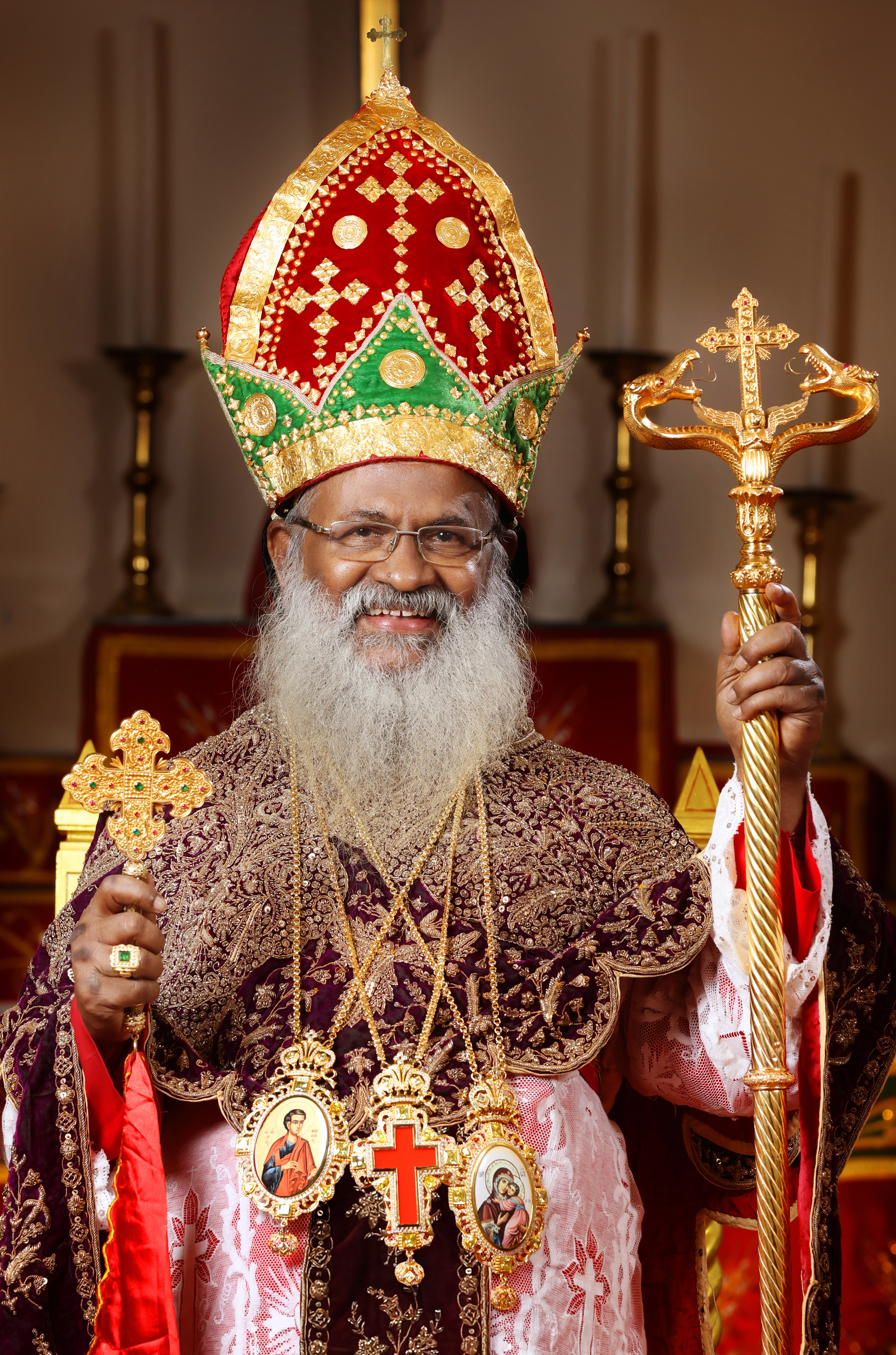
Baselios Marthoma Mathews III Present Catholicos and Malankara Metropolitan

The spiritual head of the church is the Catholicos of the East, and its temporal head is the Malankara Metropolitan. Since 1934 both titles have been vested in one person; the official title of the head of the church is "Catholicos of the Apostolic Throne of Saint Thomas and the Malankara Metropolitan". Baselios Marthoma Mathews III was enthroned as the Malankara Metropolitan and Catholicos of the East. He is the ninth Catholicos of the East in Malankara and the 21st Malankara Metropolitan.

Oriental Orthodox Churches, including the Malankara Orthodox Syrian Church, accept only the first three ecumenical councils: the First Council of Nicaea, the First Council of Constantinople, and the Council of Ephesus. The church, like all other Oriental Orthodox Churches, uses the original Nicene Creed without the filioque clause. Like the Syriac Orthodox Church, it primarily uses the Liturgy of Saint James in Malayalam, Konkani, Kannada, Hindi, English, and other Indian languages.

=== Liturgy and canonical hours ===
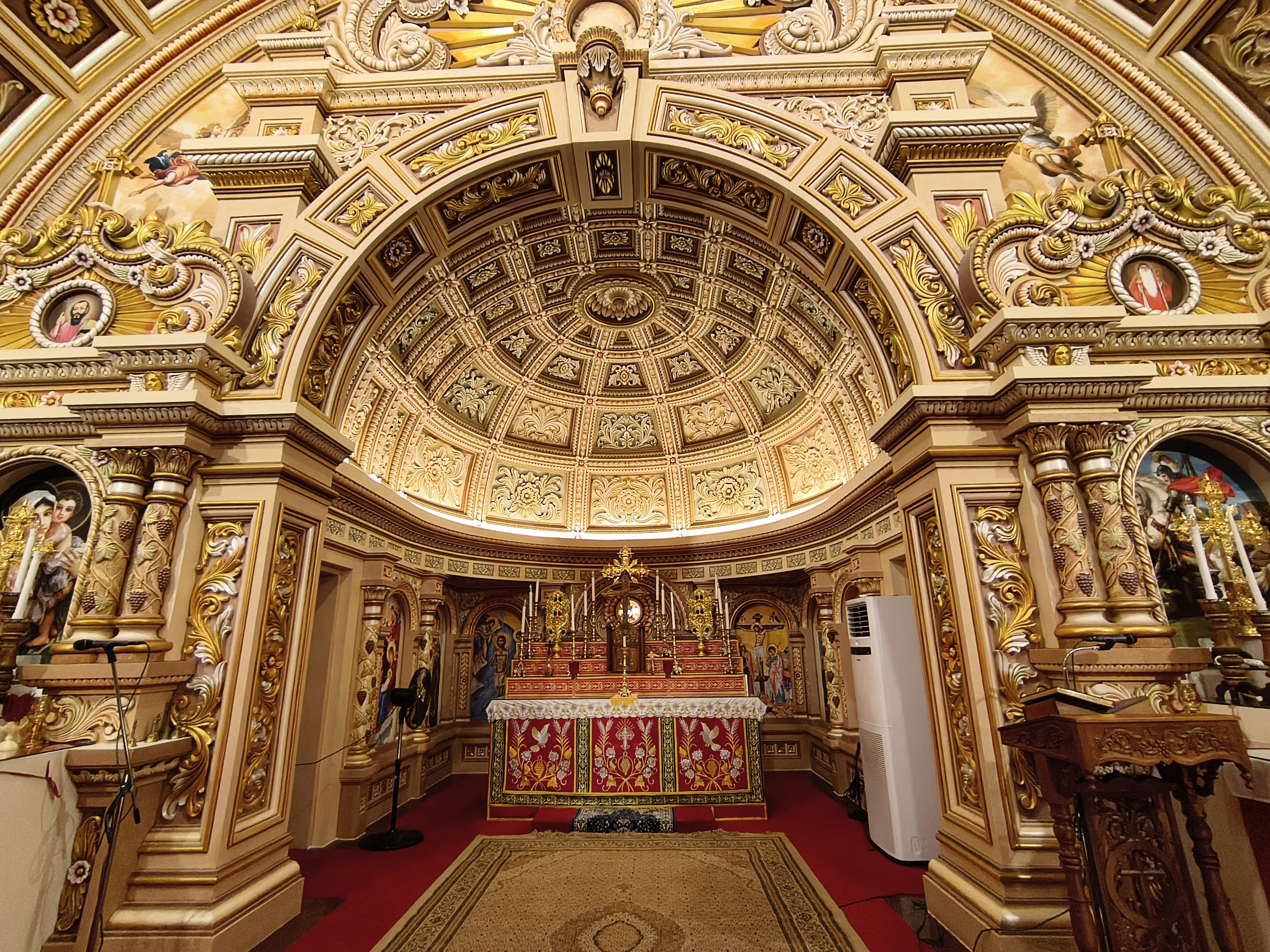
Holy Altar of St. Mary's Orthodox Syrian Church, Kallada

The church has used the Malankara Rite, part of the Antiochene Rite, since the 17th century. The Syriac Orthodox and Maronite churches also belong to the same liturgical family. In the first half of the fifth century the Antiochene church adopted the Liturgy of Saint James. In the 4th and 5th centuries the liturgical language of fourth- and fifth-century Jerusalem and Antioch was Greek, and the original liturgy was composed in Greek.

After the Council of Chalcedon in 451, the Eastern Church was divided in two:‌ one group accepted the council and the other opposed it. Both groups continued to use the Greek version of the Saint James Liturgy. The Chaleconian-leaning Byzantine emperor Justin I (518–527) expelled his opponents from Antioch, and they took refuge in Syriac-speaking Mesopotamia on the Roman-Persian border (modern eastern Syria, northern Iraq, and southeastern Turkey). The Antiochene liturgical rites were gradually translated into Syriac, and more Syriac hymns were introduced.

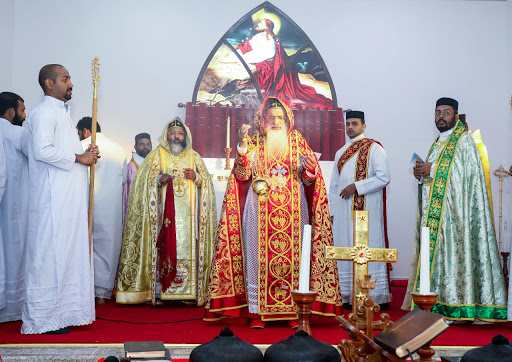
Eucharist celebration of the church

Gregorios Abdal Jaleel came to Malankara from Jerusalem in 1665 and introduced Syriac Orthodox liturgical rites. The most striking characteristic of the Antiochene liturgy is its large number of anaphoras (celebrations of the Eucharist). About eighty are known, and about a dozen are used in India. All have been composed following the Liturgy of Saint James. The Liturgy of Addai and Mari is still in use in anaphora form, similar to the Maronite Sharar. The anaphora of St. John Chrysostom is also sometimes used.

Christians of the Malankara Orthodox Syrian Church pray the canonical hours of the Shehimo at fixed prayer times seven times a day.

=== Saints ===
Like other Oriental Orthodox Churches, Eastern Orthodox, and the Catholic Church, the Malankara Orthodox Syrian Church adheres to the tradition of seeking the intercession of saints. Several have been independently canonised:

- Geevarghese Gregorios of Parumala – Entombed in St. Peter and St. Paul's Church, Parumala, and canonised by Geevarghese II in 1947
- Baselios Yeldo – Entombed in St. Thomas Church, Kothamangalam, and canonised by Geevarghese II in 1947
- Geevarghese Dionysius of Vattasseril – Entombed in the Orthodox Theological Seminary, Kottayam, and canonised by Mathews II in 2003
- Antonio Francisco Xavier Alvares – Entombed in St. Mary's Orthodox Church, Ribandar, and declared a regional saint by Paulose II in 2015 without formal canonisation
- Fr. Roque Zephrin Noronah – Entombed in St. Mary's Orthodox Cathedral, Brahmavar, and declared a regional saint by Paulose II in 2015 without formal canonisation
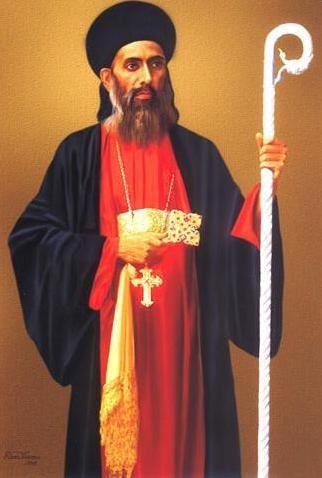
Geevarghese Gregorios of Parumala

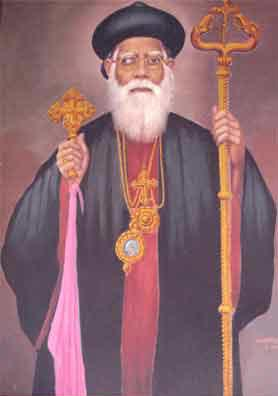
Geevarghese Dionysius of Vattasseril

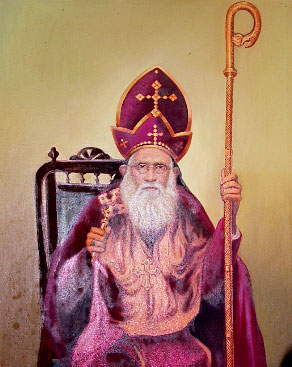
Antonio Francisco Xavier Alvares

=== Metropolitan ===
The temporal, ecclesiastical and spiritual administration of the church is vested in the Malankara Metropolitan, subject to the church constitution which was adopted in 1934. The Malankara Metropolitan is president of the Malankara Syrian Christian Association (Malankara Association) and its managing committee, and trustee of community properties. He is the custodian of the Pazhaya Seminary and other common properties of Malankara Syrian Community. He is also the custodian of vattipanam interest which was deposited in Travancore Government by Marthoma VII. He is elected by the Malankara association.

==== List of Malankara metropolitans ====
1. Thoma I (1653–1670)
2. Thoma II (1670–1686)
3. Thoma III (1686–1688)
4. Thoma IV (1688–1728)
5. Thoma V (1728–1765)
6. Thoma VI (1765–1808)
7. Thoma VII (1808–1809)
8. Thoma VIII (1809–1816)
9. Thoma IX (1816)
10. Dionysius II (1816)
  1. Mar Philoxenos II (1816–1818)
11. Dionysius III (1817–1825)
12. Dionysius IV (1825–1852)
13. Mathews Athanasius (1852–1877)
14. Dionysius V (1865–1909)
15. Dionysius VI (1909–1934)
16. Geevarghese II (1934–1964) From 1934 Malankara Metropolitan also holds the office of Catholicos of the East of the Malankara Orthodox Syrian Church.
17. Augen I (1964–1975), also Catholicos of the East
18. Mathews I (1975–1991), also Catholicos of the East
19. Mathews II (1991–2005), also Catholicos of the East
20. Didymos I (2005–2010), also Catholicos of the East
21. Paulose II (2010–2021), also Catholicos of the East
22. Mathews III (15 October 2021 – present), also Catholicos of the East

=== Catholicate ===
Catholicos means "the general head", and can be considered equivalent to "universal bishop". The early church had three priestly ranks: episcopos (bishop), priest and deacon. By the end of the third century bishops of important cities in the Roman Empire became known as metropolitans. The fourth-century ecumenical councils recognized the authority of the metropolitan. By the fifth century the bishops of Rome, Constantinople, Alexandria and Antioch gained control of the churches in surrounding cities. They gradually became the heads of the regional churches, and were known as patriarchs (common father).

Outside the Roman Empire, a patriarch was known as catholicos. There were four catholicates before the fifth century: the Catholicate of the East, the Catholicate of Armenia, the Catholicate of Georgia, and the Catholicate of Albania. The archdeacons reigned from the fourth to the 16th centuries; in 1653 the archdeacon was elevated to bishop by the community as Mar Thoma I.

The Catholicate of the East was relocated to India in 1912, and Baselios Paulose I was seated on the apostolic throne of St. Thomas as the Catholicos of the East by the disposed patriarch of Antioch Abdul Masih. The headquarters of the Malankara Orthodox Syrian Church and the Catholicos of the East is the Catholicate Palace at Devalokam, Kottayam, Kerala, which was consecrated on 31 December 1951. The new palace, built in 1961, was dedicated by visiting Armenian Catholicos Vazgen I.

The Holy Synod and Managing committee designated H.G.Dr. Mathews Mor Severios to the new Malankara Metropolitan and Catholicos of Malankara Church succeeding Baselios Marthoma Paulose II. He was consecrated as the 22nd Malankara Metropolitan during the Malankara Association that took place on 14 October 2021 at St. Peter and St. Paul's Church, Parumala, and enthroned as the 9th catholicos of Malankara Church on 15 October 2021. Relics of St Thomas are kept in the catholicate chapel in addition to relics of Geevarghese II, Augen I, Mathews I and Paulose II also being interred there.

==== List of Catholicos of the East of the Malankara Orthodox Syrian Church ====
- Baselios Paulose I (1912–1913)
  - Vacant (1913–1925)
- Baselios Geevarghese I (1925–1928)
- Baselios Geevarghese II (1929–1964)
  - From 1934 Catholicos is also holding the office of Malankara Metropolitan.
- Baselios Augen I (1964–1975)
- Baselios Mar Thoma Mathews I (1975–1991)
- Baselios Mar Thoma Mathews II (1991–2005)
- Baselios Mar Thoma Didymos I (2005–2010)
- Baselios Mar Thoma Paulose II (2010–2021)
- Baselios Mar Thoma Mathews III (2021–present)

== Administration ==
Until the 17th century, the church was administered by the archdeacon (Malankara Moopan). The elected archdeacon was in charge of day-to-day affairs, including the ordination of deacons to the priesthood. Ordinations were performed by Persian bishops visiting India. The Malankara Palliyogam (a forerunner of the Malankara Association) consisted of elected representatives from individual parishes. The isolation of the Malankara Church from the rest of Christendom preserved the apostolic age's democratic nature through interactions with Portuguese (Roman Catholic) and British (Anglican) colonialists. From the 17th to the 20th centuries, the church had five pillars of administration:

- The Episcopal Synod, presided over by the Catholicos of the East
- The Malankara Association, presided by Malankara Metropolitan
- Three trustees: the Malankara metropolitan, the priest trustee, and lay trustees
- The Malankara Association's managing and working committees

=== 1934 church constitution ===
Envisioned by Dionysius VI, the church's general and day-to-day administration was codified in its 1934 constitution. The constitution was presented at the 26 December 1934 Malankara Christian Association, meeting at M. D. Seminary, and was adopted and enacted. It has been amended three times. Although the constitution was challenged in court by dissident supporters of the patriarch of Antioch, Supreme Court rulings in 1958, 1995, 2017, and 2018 upheld its validity.

The constitution's first article asserts the relationship between the Syriac Orthodox and the Indian Orthodox churches. The second article addresses the establishment of the Malankara Church by St. Thomas and ascribes primacy to the catholicos. The third article regards the church's name. The fourth article describes the faith and its traditions. The fifth article examines church governance canon law.

=== Malankara Association ===
The elected Malankara Association, consisting of parish members, manages the church's religious and social concerns. Formerly the Malankara Palli-yogam (Malayalam: മലങ്കര പള്ളി യോഗം, lit. 'Malankara Parish Assembly'), its modern form is believed to have been founded in 1873 as the Mulanthuruthy Synod, a gathering of parish representatives in Parumala. In 1876 the Malankara Association began.

The church constitution outlines the association's powers and responsibilities. The Catholicos of the East and Malankara Metropolitan is the president, and the diocesan metropolitan bishops are vice-presidents. All positions are elected. Each parish is represented in the association by an elected priest and laypeople, proportional to parish-membership size.

=== Co-trustees ===
This is a list of co-trustees (priest trustee & lay trustee) elected by the Malankara Association of the Malankara Orthodox Syrian Church:

Year of Election	Clergy Trustee	Duration	Lay Trustee	Duration
1869	Punnathra Chacko Chandapilla Kathanar	21 Oct 1869 – 13 Sep 1886	Kulangara Ittychan Pailey	12 Oct 1869 – ?
1886	Konat Kora Yohannan Kathanar	13 Sep 1886 – 9 Mar 1890	Kunnumpurath Kora Ulahannan, Kottayam	13 Sep 1886 & 31 Mar 1892 – 24 Feb 1901
1892	Konat Kora Mathan Malpan	31 Mar 1892 & 23 Nov 1895 – 7 Sep 1911	-	
1901	-		C. J. Kurien (Kunnumpurath Ulahannan Kora), Kottayam	25 Apr 1901 – 7 Sep 1911
1911	Palappalil Mani Paulose Kathanar Pampakuda	7 Sep 1911 – 21 Dec 1955	Chirakadavil Kora Kochu Korula, Kottayam (d. 1931)	07 Sep 1911 – 31 May 1931
1931	-		E. I Joseph, Kottayam	10 Jul 1931 – 15 Jul 1946
1958	Manalil Jacob Kathanar	26 Dec 1958 – 28 Dec 1965	Ooppoottil Kurian Abraham, Kottayam	26 Dec 1958 – 12 Dec 1978
1965	Thengumthottathil T. S. Abraham Cor Episcopa	28 Dec 1965 – 28 Dec 1982	-	
1980	-		Padinjarekkara P. C. Abraham, Kottayam	1 May 1980 – 21 Mar 2007
1982	Konat Abraham Malpan	28 Dec 1982 – 3 Mar 1987	-	
1987	Fr. Mathai Nooranal	29 Dec 1987 – 29 Nov 2002	-	
2004	Fr. Dr. O. Thomas	10 Jun 2004 – 21 Mar 2007	-	
2007	Fr. Johns Abraham Konat	21 Mar 2007 – 7 Mar 2012	M.G. George Muthoot	21 Mar 2007 – 7 Mar 2012
2012	Fr. Johns Abraham Konat	7 Mar 2012 – 1 Mar 2017	M.G. George Muthoot	7 Mar 2012 – 1 Mar 2017
2017	Fr. Dr. M.O. John	1 Mar 2017 – 4 Aug 2022	George Paul (d. 2019)	1 Mar 2017 – 26 Nov 2019
2022	Fr. Dr. Thomas Varghese Amayil	4 Aug 2022 – present	Ronny Varghese Abraham	4 Aug 2022 – present

=== Dioceses ===
The following are Malankara Orthodox Syrian Church dioceses:

Dioceses	Territory	Incumbent Metropolitan
Thiruvananthapuram Diocese	Thiruvananthapuram and Kanyakumari	H. G. Dr. Gabriel Mar Gregorios
Kollam Diocese	Kollam	H. G. Dr. Joseph Mar Dionysius
Kottarakkara Punaloor Diocese	Kottarakkara, Punalur	H. G. Yuhanon Mar Thevodoros
Adoor Kadampanad Diocese	Adoor, Kadampanad	H. G. Zacharias Mar Aprem
Thumpamon Diocese	Thumpamon	H. G. Abraham Mar Seraphim
Nilakal Diocese	Nilackal and Ranni regions	H. G. Joshua Mar Nicodimos
Mavelikara Diocese	Mavelikara	H. G. Abraham Mar Ephiphanios
Chengannur Diocese	Chengannur	H. G. Mathews Mar Thimotheos
Niranam Diocese	Niranam	H. G. Yuhanon Mar Chrysostamos
Kottayam Diocese	Kottayam	H. G. Yuhanon Mar Dioscoros
Kottayam Central Diocese	Kottayam	Baselios Marthoma Mathews III
Idukki Diocese	Idukki	H. G. Zachariah Mar Severios
Kandanad West Diocese	Kandanad	Baselios Marthoma Mathews III
Kandanad East Diocese	Kandanad	H. G. Thomas Mar Athanasius
Kochi Diocese	Kochi	H. G. Yakob Mar Irenios
Angamaly Diocese	Angamaly	H. G. Yuhanon Mar Policarpos
Thrissur Diocese	Thrissur	H. G. Yuhanon Mar Meletius
Kunnamkulam Diocese	Kunnamkulam	H. G. Geevarghese Mar Yulios
Malabar Diocese	Malabar	H. G. Geevarghese Mar Pachomios
Sulthan Bathery Diocese	Wayanad	H. G. Geevarghese Mar Barnabas
Brahmavar Diocese	Karnataka, Goa	H. G. Yakob Mar Elias
Bangalore Diocese	Bangalore, Andhra Pradesh and Telangana	H. G. Geevarghese Mar Philoxenos (Asst.)
Madras Diocese	Tamilnadu, Andaman Nicobar and Sri Lanka	H. G. Geevarghese Mar Philoxenos
Bombay Diocese	Maharashtra	H. G. Geevarghese Mar Coorilose
Ahmedabad Diocese	Madhya Pradesh, Gujarat , Rajasthan and Oman	H. G. Geevarghese Mar Theophilos
Delhi Diocese	Uttar Pradesh,Punjab,Haryana, Delhi and United Arab Emirates	H. G. Youhanon Mar Demetrios
Calcutta Diocese	Chhattisgarh, Madhya Pradesh and parts of - Arunachal Pradesh, Assam, Bihar, Maharashtra, Jharkhand, Manipur, Meghalaya, Mizoram, Nagaland, Odisha, Sikkim, Tripura, and West Bengal	H. G. Alexios Mar Eusebios
UK, Europe and Africa Diocese	UK, Europe	H. G. Abraham Stephanos
Northeast America Diocese	America	H. G. Zachariah Mar Nicholovos
Southwest America Diocese	America	H. G. Thomas Mar Ivanios
Canada Diocese	Canada	H. G. Zachariah Mar Nicholovos
Asia Pacific Diocese	Asia and Pacific Regions	H. G. Yuhanon Mar Dioscoros

=== Metropolitan bishops ===
The church's episcopal synod has the following diocesan bishops:

Diocesan Bishop	Metropolitan of Diocese	Notes
Baselios Marthoma Mathews III	Kottayam Central, Kandanad West, Trivandrum Diocese, Bangalore Diocese, Asia Pacific Diocese and Canada Diocese	Catholicos of the East and Malankara Metropolitan.
Thomas Athanasius	Kandanad East Diocese	
Yuhanon Meletius	Thrissur Diocese	
Kuriakose Clemis		Valiya Metropolita – Retired
Geevarghese Coorilose	Bombay Diocese	
Zachariah Nicholovos	Northeast America Diocese	Asst. Metropolitan of Canada Diocese
Yakob Irenios	Kochi Diocese	
Gabriel Gregorios		Retired
Yuhanon Chrysostamos	Niranam Diocese	
Yuhanon Policarpos	Ankamali Diocese	
Mathews Theodosius		On Leave
Joseph Dionysius	Kollam Diocese	
Abraham Ephiphanios	Mavelikara Diocese	
Mathews Thimothios	Chengannur Diocese	
Alexios Eusebios	Calcutta Diocese	
Yuhanon Mar Dioscoros	Kottayam Diocese	Asst. Metropolitan of Kottayam Central, Asia Pacific Diocese
Youhanon Demetrios	Delhi Diocese	
Yuhanon Thevodoros	Kottarakara–Punalur Diocese	
Yakob Elias	Brahmavar Diocese	
Joshua Nicodemos	Nilackal Diocese	
Zacharias Aprem	Adoor–Kadampanadu Diocese	
Geevarghese Yulios	Kunnamkulam Diocese	
Abraham Seraphim	Thumpamon Diocese	
Abraham Stephanos	UK, Europe, Africa Diocese	
Thomas Ivanios	Southwest America Diocese	
Geevarghese Theophilos	Ahmedabad Diocese	Asst. Metropolitan of Bombay Diocese
Geevarghese Philexinos	Madras Diocese	Asst. Metropolitan of Bangalore Diocese
Geevarghese Pachomios	Malabar Diocese	
Geevarghese Barnabas	Sulthan Bathery Diocese	
Zachariah Severios	Idukki Diocese	Asst. Metropolitan of Kandanad West Diocese

== Monasteries and convents ==
=== Monasteries ===
Name	Location
Monastery of Saint Thomas, Vettikkal	Vettikkal
Mount Tabor Monastery, Pathanapuram	Pathanapuram
The Bethany Ashram	Perunad
Bethlehem Ashram	Chengamanad, Kottarakara
St. George Dayara	Othera
St. Paul’s Ashram	Puthuppady, Kozhikode
St. Basil Dayara	Pathanamthitta
Holy Trinity Ashram	Angady, Ranni
Mar Kuriakose Ashram	Kumbazha North
Mar Baselius Dayara	Njaliakuzhy, Vakathanam
Mount Carmel Ashram	Mathilakom, East Kallada
Mount Horeb Ashram	Muthupilakad
MGD Ashram and Balabhavan	Karunagiri, Karukachal
Christa Sishya Ashram	Thadagom , Coimbatore (T.N.)
Mar Gregorios Bethel Ashram	Kuttikonam, Kunnicode
St. George Mount Ashram	Chayalode
St. Thomas Ashram	Nellipathy, Agali P.O., Palakkad
St. Thomas Karunya Vishranthi Bhavan	Trivandrum
St. Thomas Karunya Ashram	Trivandrum
St. Thomas Karunya MAS, SAF, SHF	Trivandrum
Mount Calvary Ashram	Pattazhy, Kottarakara
St. George Ashram	Kulamudi, Mylom, Kottarakara
Mount Tabore Ashram	Mathuramala, Pattazhi
Mar Augen Ashram, Piramadom (S)	Pampakkuda
St. Gregorios Mount Ashram	Kottarakara
St. Thomas Ashram	Sooranad, Kollam
Bethany Ashram	Kunnamkulam
Bethany Ashram	Kuzhimattom
St. Anthony's Ashram	Thannithodu
St. Thomas Ashram	Bhilai
Gregorian Community	Roha
St. Anthony's Ashram	Mallapally
Mount Olive Ashram	Idukki

=== Convents ===
Name	Location
Bethany Convent	Ranni – Perunad
Mount Tabore Convent	Pathanapuram
St. Mary Magdalene Convent	Adupputty, Kunnamkulam
Bethlehem Convent	Kizhakkambalam, Alwaye
Nazareth Convent	Kadampanad South
Basalel Convent	Sooranad, Kollam
St. Mary’s Convent	Kozhimala, Vallamkulam
St. Mary’s Asha Bavan	Kozhimala, Vallamkulam
St. Paul’s Convent and Balikabhavan	Puthuppady, Kozhikode
Mount Carmel Convent	East Kallada, Kollam
Gethsemon Convent	Adichanalloor, Kollam
Holy Cross Convent	Sreekariyam – Trivandrum
St. Mary’s Convent	Thumpamon
St. Gregorios Convent	Kalanthode, NITC, Kozhikode
Gregorian Community	Roha
St Thomas Convent	Bhilai

== Spiritual organizations ==
The church has a number of spiritual organizations:

- Orthodox Syrian Sunday School Association of the East (OSSAE)
- Orthodox Christian Youth Movement (OCYM)
- Mar Gregorios Orthodox Christian Student Movement (MGOCSM)
- Divyabodhanam (Theological Education Programme for the Laity)
- St. Paul's & St.Thomas Suvishesha Sangam (National Association for Mission Studies)
- Orthodox Sabha Gayaka Sangham
- Malankara Orthodox Baskiyoma Association
- Servants of the Cross
- Akhila Malankara Prayer Group Association
- Akhila Malankara Orthodox Shusrushaka Sangham (AMOSS)
- Mission Board and Mission Society
- Ministry of Human Empowerment
- Akhila Malankara Balasamajam
- St. Thomas Orthodox Vaidika Sanghom
- Marth Mariam Vanitha Samajam (women's wing)
- Sruti School of Liturgical Music
- Ecological Commission
- Ardra Charitable Trust

== Seminaries ==
The two major seminaries, which offer Bachelor's and Master's degrees in theology, are Orthodox Theological Seminary, Kottayam and St. Thomas Orthodox Theological Seminary, Nagpur. The Malankara Orthodox Seminary at Kottayam, established 1815, is the first Orthodox seminary in Asia.

== Ecumenical relations ==
The church was a founding member of the World Council of Churches. Catholicos Geevarghese II and other metropolitan participated in the 1937 Conference on Faith and Order in Edinburgh; a church delegation participated in the 1948 WCC meeting in Amsterdam in 1948, and the church played a role in the 1961 WCC conference in New Delhi. Metropolitan Paulos Gregorios was president of the WCC from 1983 to 1991.

The church participated in the 1965 Conference of Oriental Orthodox Churches in Addis Ababa. It is a member of the Faith and Order Commission, the Christian Conference of Asia, and the Global Christian Forum. A number of primates of sister churches have visited, including Patriarch Justinian of Romania in February 1957 and in January 1969; Catholicos of All Armenians Vazgen I in December 1963; Armenian Patriarch Derderian of Jerusalem in December 1972; Patriarch Pimen I of Moscow in January 1977; Catholicos-Patriarch of All Georgia Ilia II in September 1982; Archbishop of Canterbury Robert Runcie in 1986, Patriarch Teoctist Arăpașu of Romania in 1989; Ecumenical Patriarch of Constantinople Bartholomew I in November 2000; Metropolitan (later Patriarch) Kirill of the Russian Orthodox Church in December 2006; Catholicos of All Armenians Karekin II in November 2008, Patriarch of Ethiopia Abune Paulos in December 2008; the Armenian Catholicos of Cilicia Aram I Keshishian in February 2010, and Patriarch of Ethiopia Abune Mathias in November 2016.

In May 2025, a trilateral meeting involving the Coptic Orthodox Church, the Syriac Orthodox Church, and the Armenian Apostolic Church (of the Great House of Cilicia) took place at the Monastery of Saint Pishoy in Wadi El Natrun, Egypt to commemorate the 1700th anniversary of the Council of Nicaea. During this meeting, Pope Tawadros II and Catholicos Aram I expressed their solidarity and support for the decision made by the universal synod of the Syriac Orthodox Church of Antioch not to participate in any liturgical celebrations or formal theological dialogues in the presence of representatives of the "separated faction of the Church in India". Additionally, the Coptic and Armenian representatives extended an invitation to discuss the ongoing rift between the two claimants to the title of Catholicos of the East, in the presence of the Patriarch of Antioch; in response, while welcoming the peace mediation efforts, the Malankara Orthodox Syrian Church (MOSC) issued a statement denouncing aspects of the joint declaration and also cited the ordination of a new maphrian in India by Antioch as a violation of its jurisdictional authority.

On 10 November 2025, Catholicos Mathews III was received by Pope Tawadros II in Cairo, and a meeting was held. Following discussions, the formation of a joint committee between the Syriac Orthodox Church and the Malankara Orthodox Syrian Church was proposed, mediated by the Coptic and Armenian churches.

=== Order of St. Thomas ===
The Order of St. Thomas, the church's highest award, is presented to heads of state and churches by the Catholicos of the East and Malankara Metropolitan. Recipients include Bartholomew I of Constantinople, Patriarch and Catholicos of All Armenians Karekin II, Patriarch of Ethiopia Abune Paulos, Armenian Catholicos of Cilicia Aram I, and Patriarch of Ethiopia Abune Mathias.

== See also ==
- List of Malankara metropolitans
- List of metropolitans of the Indian Orthodox Church

== Bibliography ==
- Baum, Wilhelm; Winkler, Dietmar W. (2003). The Church of the East: A Concise History. London-New York: Routledge-Curzon. ISBN 9781134430192.
- Brock, Sebastian P. (2016). "Miaphysite, not Monophysite!". Cristianesimo Nella Storia. 37 (1): 45–52. ISBN 9788815261687.
- Brown, Leslie W. (1956). The Indian Christians of St Thomas: An Account of the Ancient Syrian Church of Malabar. Cambridge: Cambridge University Press.
- Fahlbusch, Erwin Fahlbusch, Geoffrey William Bromiley (198), The Encyclopedia of Christianity, Wm. B. Eerdmans Publishing, 2008, ISBN 978-0-8028-2417-2
- Frykenberg, Robert E. (2008). Christianity in India: From Beginnings to the Present. Oxford: Oxford University Press. ISBN 978-0-19-826377-7.
- Joseph Cheeran, et al.(2002) Tradition and History of Indian Orthodox Church, p. 300–423
- Menachery, George (1973). The St. Thomas Christian Encyclopaedia of India Vol. II.
- Menachery, George (1998). The Indian Church History Classics: The Nazranies.
- Neill, Stephen (1966). Colonialism and Christian Missions. New York: McGraw-Hill.
- Neill, Stephen (2004) [1984]. A History of Christianity in India: The Beginnings to AD 1707. Cambridge: Cambridge University Press. ISBN 9780521548854.
- Neill, Stephen (2002) [1985]. A History of Christianity in India: 1707-1858. Cambridge: Cambridge University Press. ISBN 9780521893329.
- Tamcke, Martin (2009). Die Christen vom tur Abdin: Hinführung zur Syrisch-orthodoxen Kirche. Verlag Otto Lembeck. 3874765806.
- Vadakkekara, Benedict (2007). Origin of Christianity in India: A Historiographical Critique. Delhi: Media House. ISBN 9788174952585.
- Van der Ploeg, J. P. M. (1983). The Christians of St. Thomas in South India and their Syriac Manuscripts. Dharmaram Publications.
- Wilmshurst, David (2000). The Ecclesiastical Organisation of the Church of the East, 1318–1913. Louvain: Peeters Publishers. ISBN 9789042908765.
- Wilmshurst, David (2011). The Martyred Church: A History of the Church of the East. London: East & West Publishing Limited. ISBN 9781907318047.
- Winkler, Dietmar W. (1997). "Miaphysitism: A New Term for Use in the History of Dogma and in Ecumenical Theology". The Harp. 10 (3): 33–40.
