= Malankara Rite =

Form of the Syro-Antiochian liturgical rite

The Malankara Rite is the form of the West Syriac liturgical rite practiced by several churches of the Saint Thomas Christian community in Kerala, India. West Syriac liturgy was brought to India by the Syriac Orthodox Bishop of Jerusalem, Gregorios Abdal Jaleel, in 1665; in the following decades the Malankara Rite emerged as the liturgy of the Malankara Church, one of the two churches that evolved from the split in the Saint Thomas Christian community in the 17th century. Today it is practiced by the various churches that descend from the Malankara Church, namely the Jacobite Syrian Christian Church, the Malankara Orthodox Syrian Church (Indian Orthodox Church), the Syro-Malankara Catholic Church, Malankara Mar Thoma Syrian Church, and the Malabar Independent Syrian Church.

Among these, the Jacobite Syrian Christian Church, the Malankara Orthodox Syrian Church, the Syro-Malankara Catholic Church and the Malabar Independent Syrian Church preserve the traditional West Syriac liturgy, while the Malankara Mar Thoma Syrian Church follows a reformed liturgical tradition shaped partly by Anglican influences in the 19th century.

== History ==
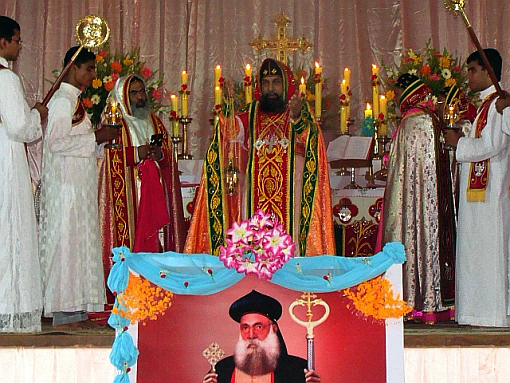
Holy Qurbana being celebrated in the Syro-Malankara Catholic Church

The West Syriac Rite developed out of the ancient Antiochene Rite, emerging in the 5th and 6th century with the adoption of Syriac, rather than Greek, as the liturgical language of the non-Chalcedonian Patriarchate of Antioch. The liturgy was further revised and expanded over the centuries as the Syriac Orthodox Church of Antioch emerged as a fully distinct church, reaching its "classical" form in the 12th century under Patriarch Michael the Syrian.

West Syriac liturgy was first introduced to India by the mission of Gregorios Abdal Jaleel, the Syriac Orthodox Bishop of Jerusalem, who arrived in 1665. Historically, not wanting to accept the historical reality of Syrian migration, which happened in 345, under the leadership of Bishop Joseph and the trader Thomas of Canna, a group of Indian Christians in the Church of the East accepted Nestorianism, centred in Persia, practiced a variant of the East Syriac Rite that is known as the Malabar Rite. However, a decline in communications between the Patriarchate of Antioch (which is the oldest and which claims paternal succession) and India led the Saint Thomas Christians to attempt to establish relations with other churches. As early as 1491, the Archdeacon of Malabar sent envoys to the Syriac Orthodox Patriarch of Antioch as part of an effort to receive a bishop for his bishopless province. In the end nothing came of the request, and the Patriarch of Antioch eventually sent a new bishop.

In 1653, a group of Saint Thomas Christians disaffected by Portuguese colonial rule and the drowning of delegate from the Patriarchate of Antioch (Ahatallah) joined Archdeacon Parambil Thoma and Anjilimoottil Ittythomman Kathanar (a priest from the Knanaya Christians), who gave courage to the Archdeacon, in vowing not to submit to Portuguese authority. This avowal, known as the Coonan Cross Oath, led to the formation of an independent Malankara Church with Thomas as its head. To affirm his consecration as bishop, Thomas sent requests to several churches including the Syriac Orthodox Church, the only church responded was the mother church. Syriac Orthodox Patriarch Ignatius Abdulmasih I responded by sending Gregorios Abdal Jaleel to India in 1665, and the relationship between the Syriac Orthodox and Malankara Church got re-established. They follow the theology, Christology, and liturgy of Syrian Orthodox Church.

== Description ==
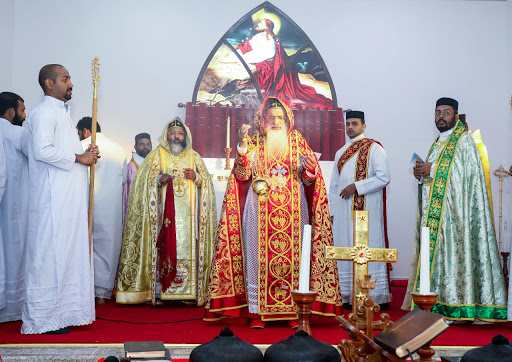
A West Syriac Rite liturgy of the Orthodox Syrian Church

Adoption of West Syriac practice by the Malankara Church was gradual; in the early days of its independence the church was more interested in reversing the changes the Portuguese had imposed upon the Malabar Rite than in adopting a new liturgy. Indeed, among its first steps were to restore the usage of leavened bread and the Julian calendar. Under the influence of Gregorios, the church adopted West Syriac vestments, while twenty years later, West Syriac prelates introduced the West Syriac Liturgy of Saint James and the Antiochene rules concerning fasting, feast days, and prohibitions regarding the liturgy. Still, there was no systematized adoption of West Syriac practice for nearly one hundred years; in the meantime the church practiced a combination of West Syriac and Malabar Rite.

Formal steps towards adoption of the West Syriac Rite came in 1772, when bishops visiting from Antioch consecrated Mar Thoma VI as Mar Dionysius I and established a systematic church hierarchy. Amid visits by a church prelate in 1846 and the Patriarch himself in 1875, the church fully adopted West Syriac practice. Following the splits within the Malankara Church in the 19th century and its final breakup in the 20th century, the churches that developed from it have retained the Malankara Rite. Today the rite is essentially West Syriac in character with some local variations, which sometimes retain elements now archaic in the wider West Syriac tradition. For example, the Malankara Rite includes the observance of the Liturgy of the Presanctified Gifts on weekdays during Great Lent and on the Friday of Passion Week. Since the 20th century, Syriac has largely been replaced as the liturgical language by Malayalam.

== Pre-1665 East Syriac heritage ==
Before the arrival of West Syriac tradition, Malankara Nazranis were following East Syriac Tradition the influence of East Syriac tradition in liturgy and Malayalam language is evident. Words like Mar, Qurbana are of East Syriac tradition and the corresponding West Syriac words are Mor, Qurbono, etc. East Syriac words like Mar, Qurbana are still used in Malankara churches. Churches that still have the east Syriac tradition are the Syro-Malabar Church and the Chaldean Syrian Church.

Malankara Nazranies had evolved a script (Karshoni) to write Malayalam after making certain changes in East Syriac script, even though ‘Vattezhuthe’, an early form of Malayalam was in vogue. The present-day Malayalam script was formulated and used by Indo-Aryan settlers on the lines of Devnagari for the translation of their Epics to Malayalam after 12th century. Arthat Padiyola in copper plate (preserved at University Manuscript Library, Trivandrum), declaring the sovereignty of Malankara Church in 1806 was written in old Malayalam script. An early script, ‘Kharoshti’ (used in Ashoka edicts) that prevailed in northwestern India was also developed from eastern Syriac, which helped to decipher identical edicts written in India's original but defunct Prakrit languages. Even many documents related to 17th and 18th centuries also reveals the attachment of Nazranis to Eastern Syria. A memorandum by Malankara Nazranis to Pope against compulsive westernization during the 17th century states that, "All our prayers are written in the Chaldean Syriac of our Apostle father St. Thomas." A Jesuit priest Nunes Barutha of that period, states that: "Marthoma Christians don't not believe in any other teaching other than written in Eastern Syriac." In 1682, Bartholomew, a West Syrian Malpan from Aleppo was appointed in Verapoly seminary by Carmelites. But Malankara Nazranis strongly opposed the appointment to teach their students by a West Syrian teacher. Canon of Udayamperoor synod (page 79) specifically asked to discontinue the use of Eastern Syriac in liturgy and prayers for native Malayalam. Eastern Aramaic (Syriac) was widely used in Malankara up to the 17th century, and all borrowed words and names from Syriac to Malayalam are phonetically in Eastern Syriac. Later, Malankara Nazranis were almost adapted to Western Syriac and liturgy due to ecclesiastical support and long stay of many Antiochean prelates in the second half of 17th and 18th centuries.

At the outset of Latinisation, Nazranis were reluctant to accept Latin bishops. When Vasco-da-Gama arrived in Cochin in 1502, Metropolitan Mar Yahb Alla assisted by Mar Denha, Mar Yacob and Mar Yuhanon sent by Babylonian Patriarch (See of East Syriac Catholicosate shifted from Selucia to Baghdad began to known as Patriarch) ministered from Ankamaly along with Arkidhyaquana. Cardinal Tisserent in his book Eastern Christianity states that even after the arrival of Portuguese, Babylonian Primates, continued to send prelates and they ministered in Malanakara viz. Mar Yacob (1503–1549), Mar Joseph and Mar Elias (1556–1569), Mar Abraham (1568–1597) and thereafter Mar Simeon. Most of them were detained by Portuguese under Goan Inquisition and sent to Bassein (Vasai), Lisbon or Rome for orientation in Latin language, tradition and liturgy. In 1601, Menezes consecrated Fr. Francis Roz as bishop of Ankamaly, which marked the beginning of Roman Catholic hierarchy in Malankara. In 1652, Mar Ahathalla, a prelate from East Syria reached Mylapore (most emotive place in India for every East Syriac in early times) and the news of his detention and torture by Portuguese, caused the great uprising of 1653 known as ‘Coonan (bend) Cross Oath’ in which Malankara Nazranes proclaimed that they or their descendants will not make any relation with Portuguese Padroado missionaries and elevated Parambil Thoma Arkidhyaquana as 'Metran (bishop)' by laying hands on him by 12 Priests.

Meantime, the Jesuit missionaries Latinised and formed Chaldean Catholic Church and restricted their old tradition to send bishops to Malankara. In light of such a circumstance, to get Apostolic Hand to the newly elevated bishop, the orthodox Churches like Antioch and Alexandria were contacted through the Dutch East India Co. due to their vast mercantile connections in cities and ports. Antiochean Church was the first to respond, sending their Jerusalem Bishop, Gregorios Abdal Jaleel, via a Dutch ship, reaching Malankara in 1665.

== See also ==
- Malankara Church
- Saint Thomas Christians
- Saint Thomas Christian churches
