= List of metropolitans of the Indian Orthodox Church =

The Malankara Orthodox Syrian Church (MOSC) also known as the Indian Orthodox Church (IOC) or simply as the Malankara Church, is an autocephalous Oriental Orthodox church headquartered in Devalokam, near Kottayam, India. The church serves India's Saint Thomas Christian (also known as Nasrani) population. According to tradition, these communities originated in the missions of Thomas the Apostle in the 1st century (circa 52 AD). It employs the Malankara Rite, an Indian form of the West Syriac liturgical rite.

The MOSC descends from the Malankara Church and its affiliation with the Syriac Orthodox Church. However, between 1909 and 1912, a schism over the authority of the Syriac Orthodox Patriarch of Antioch's authority resulted in the dissolution of the unified Malankara Church and establishment of the overlapping and conflicting MOSC and Jacobite Syrian Christian Church (JSCC). Since 1912, the MOSC has maintained a catholicate, the Catholicos of the East and Malankara Metropolitan–presently Baselios Marthoma Mathews III–who is the primate of the church. The MOSC drafted and formally adopted a constitution in 1934, wherein the church formally declared the Malankara Metropolitan and the Catholicos of the East as one. The Malankara Orthodox Syrian Church asserts communion with the other Oriental Orthodox churches. However, regular legal and occasional physical confrontations between the MOSC and the Syriac Orthodox JSCC have continued despite multiple efforts to reconcile the churches.

== List of presidents and managers of Malankara Orthodox Church ==
This is the list of appointments of new presidents and managers of the Malankara Orthodox Syrian Church as follows, in place of the outgoing presidents and managers of various organizations of our Holy Church, as determined by the Holy Episcopal Synod held at the Catholicate Aramana, Devalokam - Kottayam.

| Sl. No | Name | Position | Links |
|---|---|---|---|
| 1 | H.G Thomas Mar Athanasius | Governing Board Member, OTS Kottayam | |
| 2 | H.G Yuhanon Mar Meletius | Representative to UTC, Bangalore | |
| 3 | H.G Geevarghese Mar Coorilose | President, The Servants of the Cross, President, Ministry of Human Empowerment & Representative to CMC Ludhiana | |
| 4 | H.G Zachariah Mar Nicholovos | Vice President, Inter-Church Relations Department & President, Rule Committee | |
| 5 | H.G Dr. Yakob Mar Irenios | President, MOC Publications, President, Divyabodhanam & Representative to CASA | |
| 6 | H.G Dr. Gabriel Mar Gregorios | Manager, Catholicate & MD Corporate Schools & President, Mission Board | |
| 7 | H.G Dr. Yuhanon Mar Chrysostamos | Secretary, Holy Episcopal Synod, Representative to Working Committee & President, MDCC Sub Committee | |
| 8 | H.G Yuhanon Mar Policarpos | President, Marriage Assistance Scheme & President, Church Finance Committee | |
| 9 | H.G Mathews Mar Theodosius | President, Akhila Malankara Prayer Group Association | |
| 10 | H.G Dr. Joseph Mar Dionysius | President, Sunday School-Bala Samajam & President, Ecological Commission | |
| 11 | H.G Abraham Mar Epiphanios | President, House Building Assistance Scheme | |
| 12 | H.G Dr. Mathews Mar Thimothios | Vice President, OTS Kottayam, President, Vaidika Sanghom - Baskiyomo Association & Vice President, Ecumenical Relations Department | |
| 13 | H.G Alexios Mar Eusebios | Vice President, STOTS Nagpur | |
| 14 | H.G Dr. Yuhanon Mar Dioscoros | President, Marth Mariam Samajam-Navjyothi MOMS, President, Malankara Sabha Monthly, President, PR Department-Media Wing Manager, MMC Schools & Representative to CMC Vellore | |
| 15 | H.G Dr. Youhanon Mar Demetrios | President, Ecumenical Relations Department, President, Sunday school OKR & Representative to CMC Ludhiana | |
| 16 | H.G Dr. Yuhanon Mar Thevodoros | President, Akhila Malankara Orthodox Shusrushaka Sangham (AMOSS) & Vice President, Mission Board | |
| 17 | H.G Yakob Mar Elias | Vice President, Mission Board | |
| 18 | H.G Dr. Joshua Mar Nicodemos | President, Church Accounts Committee | |
| 19 | H.G Dr. Zacharias Mar Aprem | Manager, MOC Corporate Colleges & Vice President, MGOCSM | |
| 20 | H.G Dr. Geevarghese Mar Yulios | President, OCYM & Vice President, Ecumenical Relations Department | |
| 21 | H.G Dr. Abraham Mar Seraphim | President, MGOCSM, President, ARDRA Charitable Society, President, NARSOC, President, Land Protection Committee & Representative to ECC Bangalore | |
| 22 | H.G Dr. Geevarghese Mar Barnabas | Manager, CBSE Public Schools | |

== List of metropolitans of Holy Episcopal Synod ==
This is a list of present metropolitan of the Malankara Orthodox Syrian Church.

| Name | Date of birth | Date of ordination | Notes | Links |
|---|---|---|---|---|
| Baselios Marthoma Mathews III | 12-Feb-1949 | 30-Apr-1991; 15-Oct-2021 (as Catholicos) | 9th Catholicos of East & 22nd Malankara Metropolitan, Metropolitan of Kottayam Central Diocese, Kandanad West Diocese Canada Diocese, Asia - Pacific Diocese & Thiruvananthapuram Diocese of Malankara Orthodox Syrian Church | |
| Thomas Mar Athanasius | 28-Jun-1952 | 03-May-1990 | Metropolitan of Kandanad East Diocese | |
| Yuhanon Mar Meletius | 04-Jul-1954 | 23-Dec-1990 | Metropolitan of Thrissur Diocese | |
| Kuriakose Mar Clemis Valiya Metropolita | 26-Jul-1936 | 30-Apr-1991 | Retired from 16-Aug-2023 | |
| Geevarghese Mar Coorilose | 07-Oct-1949 | 30-Apr-1991 | Metropolitan of Mumbai Diocese | |
| Zachariah Mar Nicholovos | 13-Aug-1959 | 15-Aug-1993 | Metropolitan of Northeast American Diocese & Asst. Metropolitan of Canada Diocese from 05-11-2024 | |
| Yakob Mar Irenios | 15-Aug-1949 | 16-Aug-1993 | Metropolitan of Kochi Diocese | |
| Gabriel Mar Gregorios | 10-Feb-1948 | 05-Mar-2005 | Retired from 09-Oct-2025 | |
| Yuhanon Mar Chrysostamos | 07-Jan-1954 | 05-Mar-2005 | Metropolitan of Niranam Diocese | |
| Yuhanon Mar Policarpos | 30-Mar-1955 | 19-Feb-2009 | Metropolitan of Angamaly Diocese | |
| Mathews Mar Theodosius | 15-Sep-1955 | 19-Feb-2009 | On Leave from 03-Nov-2022 | |
| Joseph Mar Dionysius | 15-Jun-1956 | 19-Feb-2009 | Metropolitan of Kollam Diocese | |
| Abraham Mar Epiphanios | 17-Sep-1960 | 19-Feb-2009 | Metropolitan of Mavelikara Diocese | |
| Mathews Mar Thimothios | 03-May-1963 | 19-Feb-2009 | Metropolitan of Chenganoor Diocese | |
| Alexios Mar Eusebios | 25-May-1964 | 19-Feb-2009 | Metropolitan of Calcutta Diocese | |
| Yuhanon Mar Dioscoros | 28-May-1964 | 19-Feb-2009 | Metropolitan of Kottayam Diocese & Asst. Metropolitan of Kottayam Central from 15-July-2024 and Asia Pacific Diocese from 05-Nov-2024 | |
| Youhanon Mar Demetrios | 18-Dec-1952 | 12-May-2010 | Metropolitan of Delhi Diocese | |
| Yuhanon Mar Thevodoros | 10-Feb-1953 | 12-May-2010 | Metropolitan of Kottarakkara - Punaloor Diocese | |
| Yakob Mar Elias | 24-Feb-1953 | 12-May-2010 | Metropolitan of Brahmavar Diocese | |
| Joshua Mar Nicodemos | 08-Oct-1962 | 12-May-2010 | Metropolitan of Nilackal Diocese | |
| Zacharias Mar Aprem | 11-Mar-1966 | 12-May-2010 | Metropolitan of Adoor - Kadampanadu Diocese Relieved from his administrative duties and responsibilities on 23 May 2025 by the Holy Episcopal Synod of the Malankara Orthodox Syrian Church | |
| Geevarghese Mar Yulios | 17-May-1967 | 12-May-2010 | Metropolitan of Kunnamkulam Diocese | |
| Abraham Mar Seraphim | 28-Dec-1969 | 12-May-2010 | Metropolitan of Thumpamon Diocese | |
| Abraham Mar Stephanos | 15-Aug-1969 | 28-Jul-2022 | Metropolitan of UK - Europe - Africa Diocese | |
| Thomas Mar Ivanios | 13-Dec-1969 | 28-Jul-2022 | Metropolitan of Southwest America Diocese | |
| Geevarghese Mar Theophilos | 08-Aug-1971 | 28-Jul-2022 | Metropolitan of Ahmedabad Diocese & Asst. Metropolitan of Mumbai Diocese from 05-Jan-2023 | |
| Geevarghese Mar Philexinos | 30-May-1972 | 28-Jul-2022 | Metropolitan of Madras Diocese & Asst. Metropolitan of Bangalore Diocese from 27-Sep-2023 | |
| Geevarghese Mar Pachomios | 06-Mar-1973 | 28-Jul-2022 | Metropolitan of Malabar Diocese | |
| Geevarghese Mar Barnabas | 10-Apr-1973 | 28-Jul-2022 | Metropolitan of Sulthan Bathery Diocese | |
| Zachariah Mar Severios | 19-Aug-1978 | 28-Jul-2022 | Metropolitan of Idukki Diocese & Asst. Metropolitan of Kandanad West from 15-July-2024 | |

== List of past metropolitans ==
This is a list of past metropolitan who served the Malankara Orthodox Syrian Church of Malankara Church after and before the establishment of the Catholicate in India.

| Name | Date of birth | Date of ordination | Date of death | Diocese | Entombed at | Links |
|---|---|---|---|---|---|---|
| Attumalil Varambathu Zachariah Mar Anthonios | 19-Jul-1946 | 30-Apr-1991 | 20-Aug-2023 | Metropolitan of Kollam Diocese of Malankara Orthodox Syrian Church | Mount Horeb Sasthamcotta | |
| Baselios Marthoma Paulose II; Paulose Mar Milithios | 30-Aug-1946 | 15-May-1985; 01-Nov-2010 (as Catholicos) | 12-Jul-2021 | 8th Catholicos of East & 21st Malankara Metropolitan of Malankara Orthodox Syrian Church | Catholicate Aramana Chapel, Devalokam, Kottayam | |
| Kizhakkethalackal Thomas Mar Athanasios | 03-Apr-1938 | 15-May-1985 | 24-Aug-2018 | Metropolitan of Chengannur Diocese of Malankara Orthodox Syrian Church | St. George Dayara, Othera (Othara Dayara) | |
| Manjanamkuzhiyil Zachariah Mar Theophilos | 16-Sep-1952 | 05-Mar-2005 | 22-Oct-2017 | Metropolitan of Malabar Diocese of Malankara Orthodox Syrian Church | Thadakam Dayara, Coimbatore | |
| Baselios Marthoma Didymos I Thomas Mor Thimotheos | 29-Sep-1921 | 24-Aug-1966; 31-Oct-2005 (as Catholicos) | 26-May-2014 | 7th Catholicos of East & 20th Malankara Metropolitan of Malankara Orthodox Syrian Church | Mount Tabor Dayara, Pathanapuram | |
| Keeyath Geevarghese Mar Ivanios | 14-Nov-1940 | 15-May-1985 | 12-Apr-2013 | Metropolitan of Kottayam Diocese of Malankara Orthodox Syrian Church | Mar Baselios Dayara, Kottayam | |
| Mathews Mar Barnabas | 09-Aug-1924 | 15-May-1978 | 09-Dec-2012 | Metropolitan of Northeast America Diocese of Malankara Orthodox Syrian Church | St Peter's and St Paul's Orthodox Syrian Church, Valayanchirangara, Perumbavoor | |
| Poulose Mar Pachomios OIC | 26-Jan-1946 | 16-Aug-1993 | 01-Aug-2012 | Metropolitan of Mavelikara Diocese of Malankara Orthodox Syrian Church | Bethany Ashram, Perunad, Ranni | |
| Geevarghese Mar Osthathios | 09-Dec-1917 | 16-Feb-1975 | 16-Feb-2012 | Metropolitan of Niranam Diocese of Malankara Orthodox Syrian Church | St. Paul's Mission Chapel, Mavelikkara | |
| Kanianthra Job Mar Philoxenos | 08-May-1939 | 30-Apr-1991 | 20-Nov-2011 | Metropolitan of Delhi Diocese of Malankara Orthodox Syrian Church | Mount Tabor Dayara, Pathanapuram | |
| Koottarazhikathu Mathews Mar Epiphanios | 25-Nov-1928 | 15-May-1985 | 09-Feb-2009 | Metropolitan of Kollam Diocese of Malankara Orthodox Syrian Church | St. Thomas Cathedral, Kollam | |
| Philipos Mar Eusebius | 16-Jun-1931 | 15-May-1985 | 21-Jan-2009 | Metropolitan of Thumpamon Diocese of Malankara Orthodox Syrian Church | St. Basil Dayara, Pathanamthitta | |
| Thomas Mar Makarios | 26-May-1926 | 16-Feb-1975 | 23-Feb-2008 | Metropolitan of Diocese of UK, Europe and Africa Diocese of Malankara Orthodox Syrian Church | Catholicate Aramana Chapel, Devalokam, Kottayam | |
| Kayyalathu Stephanos Mar Theodosius | 02-Oct-1924 | 16-Feb-1975 | 05-Nov-2007 | Metropolitan of Calcutta Diocese of Malankara Orthodox Syrian Church | St. Thomas Ashram, Bhilai | |
| Thazhamon Augen Mar Dionysius | 01-Jul-1955 | 05-Mar-2005 | 06-Jun-2007 | Metropolitan of Idukki Diocese of Malankara Orthodox Syrian Church | Vallikkattu Dayara, Vakathanam | |
| Baselios Marthoma Mathews II; Mathews Mar Coorilose | 30-Jan-1915 | 15-May-1953 29-Apr-1991 (as Catholicos) | 26-Jan-2006 | 6th Catholicos of East & 19th Malankara Metropolitan of Malankara Orthodox Syrian Church | Mount Horeb Sasthamcotta | |
| Geevarghese Mar Diascoros | 12-Oct-1926 | 15-May-1978 | 23-Jul-1999 | Metropolitan of Thiruvananthapuram Diocese of Malankara Orthodox Syrian Church | Holy Trinity Ashram, Ranni | |
| Kallupurakkal Philipose Mar Theophilos | 09-May-1911 | 24-Aug-1966 | 28-Sep-1997 | Metropolitan of Angamaly Diocese of Malankara Orthodox Syrian Church | St. Mary's Church Thrikkunnathu | |
| Mulamootil Zachariah Mar Dionysius | 06-Aug-1924 | 15-May-1978 | 07-Jul-1997 | Metropolitan of Madras Diocese of Malankara Orthodox Syrian Church | Mount Tabor Dayara, Pathanapuram | |
| Paulos Mar Gregorios | 09-Aug-1922 | 16-Feb-1975 | 24-Nov-1996 | Metropolitan of Delhi Diocese of Malankara Orthodox Syrian Church | Old Seminary Chappel, Kottayam | |
| Baselios Marthoma Mathews I Mathews Mar Athanasius | 27-Mar-1907 | 15-May-1953 27-Oct-1975 (as Catholicos) | 08-Nov-1996 | 5th Catholicos of East & 18th Malankara Metropolitan of Malankara Orthodox Syrian Church | Catholicate Aramana Chapel, Devalokam, Kottayam | |
| Poovathumkal Joseph Mar Pachomios | 19-Jun-1926 | 16-Feb-1975 | 19-Aug-1991 | Metropolitan of Kandanad Diocese of Malankara Orthodox Syrian Church | St. George Orthodox Church, Karmelkunnu, Piravom | |
| Vaduthala Daniel Mar Philoxenos | 10-May-1910 | 15-May-1953 | 13-Dec-1990 | Metropolitan of Thumpamon Diocese of Malankara Orthodox Syrian Church | St. Basil Dayara, Pathanamthitta | |
| Narimattathil Yuhanon Mar Severios | 14-Jan-1920 | 24-Aug-1966 | 16-May-1990 | Metropolitan of Kochi Diocese of Malankara Orthodox Syrian Church | Sion Seminary, Koratty | |
| Yakob Mar Polycarpos | 19-Feb-1921 | 15-May-1978 | 26-Dec-1986 | Metropolitan of Kochi Diocese of Malankara Orthodox Syrian Church | Sion Seminary, Koratty | |
| Yuhanon Mar Athanasius OIC | 21-Mar-1928 | 15-May-1978 | 12-Oct-1980 | Metropolitan of Kottayam Diocese of Malankara Orthodox Syrian Church | Bethany Ashram, Perunad, Ranni | |
| Paret Mathews Mar Ivanios | 19-Jan-1888. | 15-May-1953 | 31-Aug-1980 | Metropolitan of Kottayam Diocese of Malankara Orthodox Syrian Church | Pampady Dayara | |
| Baselios Augen I Augen Mor Thimotheos | 26-Jun-1884 | 15-May-1927 22-May-1964 (as Catholicos) | 02-Dec-1975 | 4th Catholicos of East & 17th Malankara Metropolitan of Malankara Orthodox Syrian Church | Catholicate Aramana Chapel, Devalokam, Kottayam | |
| Kallumpurathu Thoma Mar Dionysius | 08-Jun-1887 | 06-May-1940 | 03-Dec-1972 | Metropolitan of Niranam Diocese of Malankara Orthodox Syrian Church | Mount Tabor Dayara, Pathanapuram | |
| Mookencheril Pathrose Mar Osthathios | 20-Jun-1886 | 15-May-1953 | 02-Feb-1968 | Metropolitan of Malabar Diocese of Malankara Orthodox Syrian Church | Carmel Dayara - Kerala | |
| Vayaliparambil Geevarghese Mar Gregorios | 17-Jul-1899 | 04-Aug-1946 | 06-Nov-1966 | Metropolitan of Angamaly Diocese of Malankara Orthodox Syrian Church | Thrikkunnathu Seminary | |
| Mattackal Alexios Mar Theodosios OIC | 28-Aug-1888 | 07-Apr-1938 | 06-Aug-1965 | Metropolitan of Kollam Diocese of Malankara Orthodox Syrian Church | Bethany Ashram, Perunad, Ranni | |
| Pampady Kuriakose Mar Gregorios | 05-Apr-1885 | 16-Feb-1929 | 05-Apr-1965 | Metropolitan of Kottayam Diocese of Malankara Orthodox Syrian Church | Pampady Dayara | |
| Baselios Geevarghese II; Geevarghese Mar Gregorios | 16-Jun-1874 | 08-Sep-1912; 15-Feb-1929 (as Catholicos) 24-Dec-1934 (as Malankara Metropolitan) | 03-Jan-1964 | 3rd Catholicos of East & 16th Malankara Metropolitan of Malankara Orthodox Syrian Church | Catholicate Aramana Chapel, Devalokam, Kottayam | |
| Mulayirikkal Paulose Mar Severios | 06-Nov-1910 | 04-Aug-1946 | 17-Mar-1962 | Metropolitan of Kochi Diocese of Malankara Orthodox Syrian Church | St Marys Simhasana Church, Arthat | |
| Puthencav Geevarghese Mar Philoxenos | 10-Jun-1897 | 03-Nov-1930 | 17-Apr-1951 | Metropolitan of Thumpamon Diocese of Malankara Orthodox Syrian Church | St. Mary's Orthodox Cathedral, Puthencavu | |
| St. Dionysius of Vattasseril | 31-Oct-1858 | 31-May-1908 | 23-Feb-1934 | 15th Malankara Metropolitan of Malankara Orthodox Syrian Church | Orthodox Theological Seminary, Kottayam | |
| Baselios Geevarghese I Geevarghese Mar Philoxenos | 11-Jan-1870 | 07-Feb-1913 30-Apr-1925 (as Catholicos) | 17-Dec-1928 | 2nd Catholicos of East & Metropolitan of Kottayam Diocese of Malankara Orthodox Syrian Church | Vallikkattu Dayara, Vakathanam | |
| Karottuveetil Yuyakim Mar Ivanios | 1858 | 09-Feb-1913 | 06-Jun-1925 | Metropolitan of Kandanad Diocese of Malankara Orthodox Syrian Church | St. Peter and St. Paul's Church, Parumala | |
| Alvares Mar Julius | 29-Apr-1836 | 29-Jul-1889 | 23-Sep-1923 | First Metropolitan of Goa and Ceylon of Malankara Church | St Mary's Orthodox Church, Ribander, Goa | |
| Baselios Paulose I Paulose Mor Ivanios | 17-Jan-1836 | 19-May-1877; 15-Sep-1912 (as Catholicos) | 02-May-1913 | 1st Catholicos of East & Metropolitan of Kandanadu Dioceses of Malankara Orthodox Syrian Church | St.Thomas Orthodox Syrian Church, Pampakuda | |
| Pulikkottil II Mar Dionysious V | 07-Dec-1832 | 30-Apr-1865 | 11-Jul-1909 | 14th Malankara Metropolitan of Malankara Church | Orthodox Theological Seminary, Kottayam | |
| Kadavil Paulose Mar Athanasios | 07-Dec-1833 | 03-Dec-1876 | 02-Nov-1907 | Metropolitan of Kollam Diocese of Malankara Church | St. Mary's Church Thrikkunnathu, Aluva Thrikkunathu Seminary | |
| St. Gregorios of Parumala | 15-Jun-1848 | 10-Dec-1876 | 02-Nov-1902 | Metropolitan of Niranam Diocese of Malankara Church | St. Peter and St. Paul's Church, Parumala | |
| Ambattu Geevarghese Mar Coorilose | 1834/5 | 10-Dec-1876 | 09-Mar-1891 | Metropolitan of Angamaly Diocese of Malankara Church | St. Mary's Jacobite Soonoro Cathedral, Angamaly | |
| Karavatt Shemavoon Mar Dionysius | 1822 | 17-May-1877 | 02-Oct-1886 | Metropolitan of Kochi Diocese of Malankara Church | Kadugamangalam St.Peter's & St.Paul's church | |
| Konattu Geevarghese Mar Julios | 1829 | 03-Dec-1876 | 21-Mar-1884 | Metropolitan of Thumpamon Diocese of Malankara Church | St Johns Orthodox Valiyapalli Pampakuda | |
| Palakunnath Mathews Mar Athanasius | 25-Apr-1818 | 14-Feb-1842 | 16-Jul-1877 | 13th Malankara Metropolitan of Malankara Church; *Joined to Reformed Syrian Church | Maramon Church | |
| Cheppad Mar Dionysius IV | 1781 | 27-Aug-1825 | 09-Oct-1855 | 12th Malankara Metropolitan of Malankara Church | St. George Orthodox Church, Cheppad | |
| Punnathra Mar Dionysius III | 1777 | 19-Oct-1817 | 19-May-1825 | 11th Malankara Metropolitan of Malankara Church | St. Mary's Orthodox Church, Kottayam | |
| Mar Thoma IX | | 1815 | 1816/7 | 9th Marthoma Metran of Malankara Church | St. George's Church, Kadamattom | |
| Pulikkottil Mar Dionysius II | 15-Jan-1742 | 21-Mar-1815 | 24-Nov-1816 | 10th Malankara Metropolitan of Malankara Church | Orthodox Theological Seminary, Kottayam | |
| Mar Thoma VIII | 1765 | 02-Jul-1809 | 26-Jan-1816 | 8th Marthoma Metran of Malankara Church | St. Mary's Orthodox Cathedral, Puthencavu | |
| Mar Thoma VII | | 05-May-1796 | 04-Jul-1809 | 7th Marthoma Metran of Malankara Church | St. Peter and St. Paul's Church, Kolenchery | |
| Mar Dionysius I | 1716 | 10-Jul-1761 | 08-Apr-1808 | 6th Marthoma Metran of Malankara Church | St. Mary's Orthodox Cathedral, Puthencavu | |
| Mar Thoma V | 1691 | 1728/9 | 08-May-1765 | 5th Marthoma Metran of Malankara Church | St. Mary's Church, Niranam | |
| Mar Thoma IV | 1664 | 1688/9 | 24-Mar-1728 | 4th Marthoma Metran of Malankara Church | St. Mary's Orthodox Syrian Cathedral, Kandanad | |
| Mar Thoma III | 1604 | 1686/7 | 21-Apr-1688 | 3rd Marthoma Metran of Malankara Church | St. Thomas Orthodox Cathedral, Kadampanad | |
| Mar Thoma II | 1608 | 1670 | 14-Apr-1686 | 2nd Marthoma Metran of Malankara Church | St. Mary's Church, Niranam | |
| Mar Thoma I | c.1610 | 22-May-1653 | 25-Apr-1670 | 1st Marthoma Metran of Malankara Church | St. Mary's Jacobite Soonoro Cathedral, Angamaly | |

== Episcopal Consecrations held in Malankara ==
Below are the episcopal consecrations conducted in Malankara Orthodox Syrian Church conducted in India (Malankara).

| Date | Venue | Chief Celebrant | Metropolitans Consecrated |
|---|---|---|---|
| July 28, 2022 | St. Mary's Orthodox Cathedral, Pazhanji | H.H Baselios Marthoma Mathews III | 1. H.G. Abraham Mar Stephanos; 2. H.G. Thomas Mar Ivanios; 3. H.G. Geevarghese Mar Theophilos; 4. H.G. Geevarghese Mar Philoxenos; 5. H.G. Geevarghese Mar Pachomios; 6. H.G. Geevarghese Mar Barnabas; 7. H.G. Zacharias Mar Severios |
| May 12, 2010 | Mar Elia Cathedral, Kottayam | H.H Baselios Marthoma Didymos I | 1. H.G. Dr. Yuhanon Mar Demetrios; 2. H.G. Dr. Abraham Mar Seraphim; 3. H.G. Dr. Yuhanon Mar Thevodoros; 4. H.G. Yakob Mar Elias; 5. H.G. Dr. Geevarghese Mar Yulios; 6. H.G. Dr. Zacharias Mar Aprem; 7. H.G. Dr. Joshua Mar Nicodimos |
| February 19, 2009 | St. George Orthodox Church, Puthuppally | H.H Baselios Marthoma Didymos I | 1. H.G. Yuhanon Mar Dioscoros; 2. H.G. Mathews Mar Thimothios; 3. H.G. Yuhanon Mar Polycarpos; 4. H.G. Mathews Mar Theodosius; 5. H.G. Joseph Mar Dionysius; 6. H.G. Abraham Mar Epiphanios; 7. H.G. Alexios Mar Eusebios |
| March 5, 2005 | Parumala Seminary (St. Peter's and St. Paul's Orthodox Church, Parumala) | H.H Baselios Marthoma Mathews II | 1. H.G. Dr. Gabriel Mar Gregorios; 2. H.G. Dr. Zacharias Mar Theophilos; 3. H.G. Augen Mar Dionysius; 4. H.G. Dr. Yuhanon Mar Chrysostomos |
| August 16, 1993 | Parumala Seminary (St. Peter's and St. Paul's Orthodox Church, Parumala) | H.H Baselios Marthoma Mathews II | 1. H.G. Dr. Yakob Mar Irenaios; 2. H.G. Paulose Mar Pachomios |
| April 30, 1991 | Parumala Seminary (St. Peter's and St. Paul's Orthodox Church, Parumala) | H.H Baselios Marthoma Mathews II | 1. H.G. Kuriakose Mar Clemis; 2. H.G. Geevarghese Mar Coorilos; 3. H.G. Zacharias Mar Anthonios; 4. H.G. Job Mar Philoxenos; 5. H.G. Mathews Mar Severios (later H.H Baselios Marthoma Mathews III) |
| May 15, 1985 | St. Mary's Orthodox Church, Puthiyacavu | H.H Baselios Marthoma Mathews I | 1. H.G. Thomas Mar Athanasios; 2. H.G. Geevarghese Mar Ivanios; 3. H.G. Philipose Mar Eusebios; 4. H.G. Zachariah Mar Dionysius; 5. H.G. Paulose Mar Milithios (later H.H Baselios Marthoma Paulose II) |
| May 15, 1978 | St. Mary's Orthodox Cathedral, Pazhanji | H.H Baselios Marthoma Mathews I | 1. H.G. Mathews Mar Barnabas; 2. H.G. Geevarghese Mar Diascoros; 3. H.G. Zachariah Mar Dionysius; 4. H.G. Yakob Mar Policarpos; 5. H.G. Yuhanon Mar Athanasius |
| February 16, 1975 | St. Mary's Orthodox Church, Niranam | H.H Baselios Augen I | 1. H.G. Dr. Paulos Mar Gregorios; 2. H.G. Dr. Geevarghese Mar Osthathios; 3. H.G. Dr. Thomas Mar Makarios; 4. H.G. Dr. Stephanos Mar Theodosius; 5. H.G. Joseph Mar Pachomios |
| August 24, 1966 | St. Peter's and St. Paul's Orthodox Church, Kolenchery | H.H Baselios Augen I | 1. H.G. Thomas Mar Thimotheos (later H.H Baselios Marthoma Didymos I); 2. H.G. Dr. Philipose Mar Theophilos; 3. H.G. Yuhanon Mar Severios; 4. H.G. Mathews Mar Epiphanios |
| May 15, 1953 | Mar Elia Cathedral, Kottayam | H.H Baselios Geevarghese II | 1. H.G. Mathews Mar Athanasius (later H.H Baselios Marthoma Mathews I); 2. H.G. Mathews Mar Coorilos (later H.H Baselios Marthoma Mathews II); 3. H.G. Pathrose Mar Osthathios; 4. H.G. Mathews Mar Ivanios; 5. H.G. Daniel Mar Philoxenos |
| May 06, 1940 | Mar Elia Cathedral, Kottayam | H.H Baselios Geevarghese II | 1. H.G. Thoma Mar Dionysius |
| April 7, 1938 | Mount Carmel Dayara, Mulunthuruthy | H.H Baselios Geevarghese II | 1. H.G. Alexios Mar Theodosios |
| November 3, 1930 | Parumala Seminary | H.H Baselios Geevarghese II | 1. H.G. Geevarghese Mar Philoxenos |
| February 16, 1929 | Mar Elia Cathedral, Kottayam | H.H Baselios Geevarghese II | 1. H.G. Kuriakose Mar Gregorios (Pampady Thirumeni); 2. H.G. Geevarghese Mar Ivanios (Note: He was already an Episcopa (having been consecrated directly by Baselios Geevarghese I in 1925). During this February 16, 1929 ceremony, he was formally elevated and decorated with the higher authority of a Metropolitan. Just a year and a half after this joint elevation, Mar Ivanios and his suffragan bishop, Jacob Mar Theophilos, parted ways with the Malankara Orthodox Syrian Church to form what is known today as the Syro-Malankara Catholic Church). |
| February 7, 1913 | Old Syrian Church, Chengannur | H.H Baselios Paulose I alongside H.H Patriarch Ignatius Abdul Masih II | 1. H.G. Geevarghese Mar Philoxenos; 2. Yuyakim Mar Ivanios |
| September 8, 1912 | Parumala Seminary | H.H Patriarch Ignatius Abdul Masih II | 1. Geevarghese Mar Gregorios (later H.H Baselios Geevarghese II) |
| July 29, 1889 | Old Seminary, Kottayam | Joseph Mar Dionysius V, Geevarghese Mar Gregorios of Parumala, Mar Paulose Ivanios Murimattathil of Kandanadu and Mar Athanasios (Kadavil) | 1. H.G. Antonio Francisco Xavier Alvares (Mar Julius I); 2. René Vilatte (Mar Timotheus I - He sought valid apostolic succession to establish an independent, Western-rite Orthodox Church in North America.) |
| October 2, 1886 | St. Peter and St. Paul's Syrian Orthodox Church, Kadugamangalam | Mar Dionysius V (Pulikkottil) | 1. H.G. Karottuveettil Semavun Mar Dionysius |
| December 10, 1876 | St. Thomas Syrian Orthodox Church, North Paravur | H.H Ignatius Peter III (IV) | 1. Saint Gregorios of Parumala (Geevarghese Mar Gregorios / Chathuruthil Kochu Thirumeni); 2. H.G. Paulose Mar Athanasios (Kadavil); 3. H.G. Geevarghese Mar Julius (Ambatt); 4. H.G. Paulose Mar Ivanios (Murimattom); 5. H.G. Stephanos Mar Athanasios (Karottuveettil); 6. H.G. Thoma Mar Athanasios (Chalai) |

Below are the episcopal consecrations done for Malankara Church outside India (Malankara).

| Date | Venue | Chief Celebrant | Metropolitans Consecrated |
|---|---|---|---|
| August 15, 1993 | St. Ephrem Syrian Orthodox Monastery, Damascus (Ma'arat Sayyidnaya), Syria | H.H Patriarch Ignatius Zakka I Iwas | 1. H.G. Zachariah Mar Nicholovos |
| December 23, 1990 | Patriarchal Cathedral, Damascus, Syria | H.H Patriarch Ignatius Zakka I Iwas | 1. H.G. Dr. Yuhanon Mar Meletius |
| May 3, 1990 | Patriarchal Cathedral, Damascus, Syria | H.H Patriarch Ignatius Zakka I Iwas | 1. H.G. Dr. Thomas Mar Athanasius |
| August 4, 1946 | St. Mary's Church Homs, Syria | H.H Patriarch Ignatius Aphrem I Barsauma | 1. H.G. Paulose Mar Severios (Mulayirickal); 2. H.G. Geevarghese Mar Gregorios (Vayaliparambil) |
| May 31, 1908 | St. Mark's Syrian Orthodox Monastery, Jerusalem | H.H Patriarch Ignatius Abded Aloho II (Ignatius Abdullah II) | 1. Saint Geevarghese Mar Dionysius VI (Vattasseril); 2. H.G. Paulose Mar Coorilos (Kochuparambil / Panampady) |

== See also ==
- List of Malankara metropolitans
- Malankara Orthodox Syrian Church
