= St. Mary's Orthodox Church, Kottayam =

St. Mary's Church, Kottayam
- St. Mary’s Orthodox Syrian Church, Kottayam
- Kottayam Cheriapally Maha Edavaka
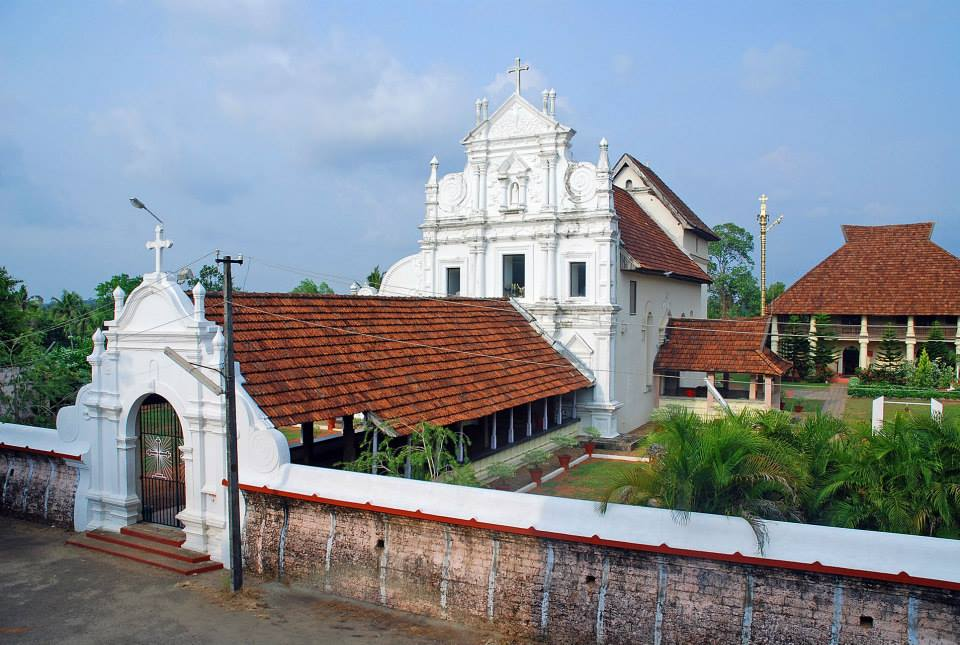

- Location within Kerala Location within India
- 9.598°N 76.510°E
- Country: India
- Denomination: Malankara Orthodox Syrian Church

History
- Founded: 1579

Architecture
- Architectural type: Baroque architecture and Architecture of Kerala

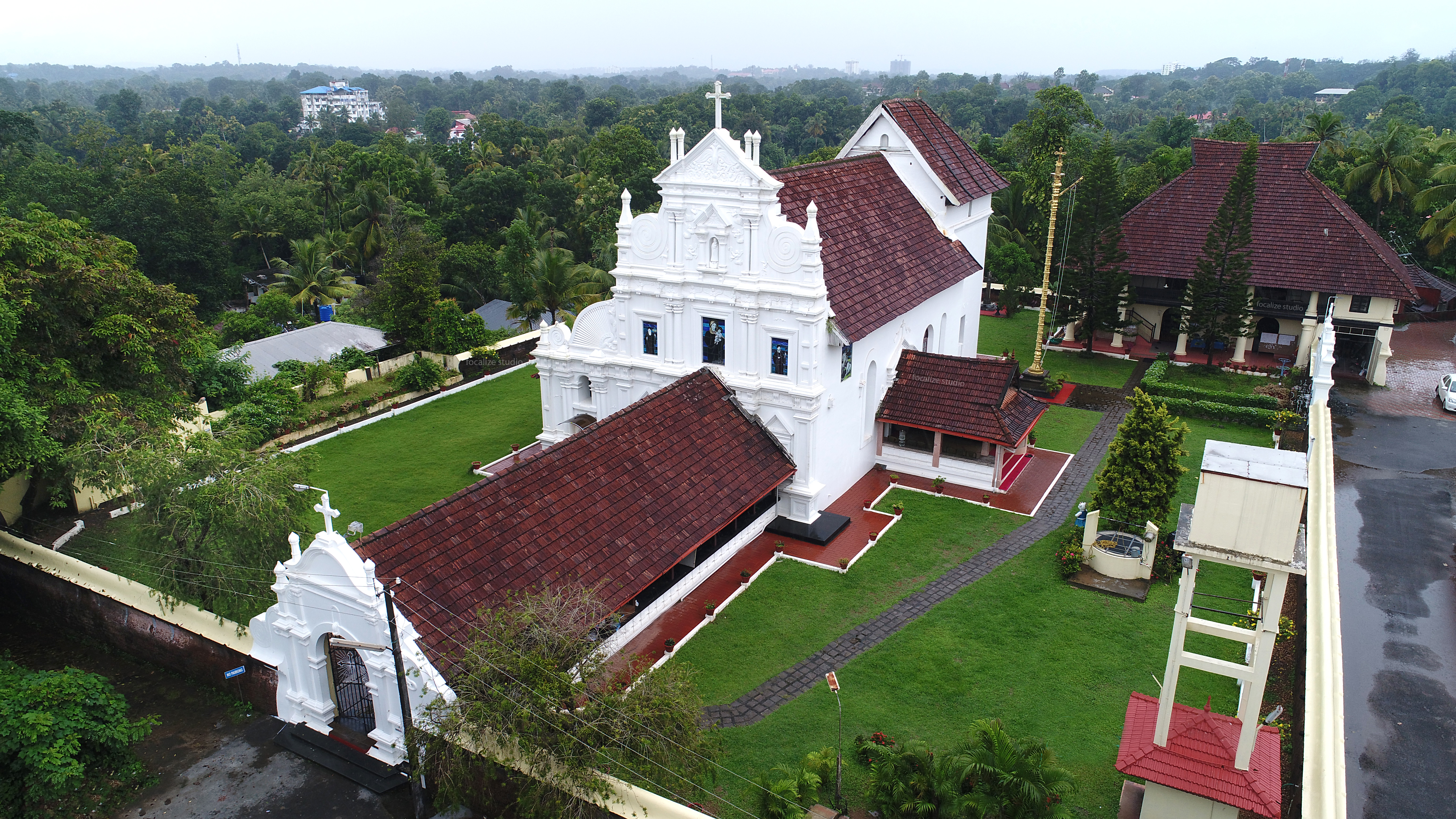
Kottayam Cheriapally Mahaedavaka

St. Mary's Orthodox Syrian Church, Kottayam, commonly known as Kottayam Cheriapally, is a Malankara Orthodox Syrian Church located in Kottayam, Kerala, India. Cheriapally meaning ‘small church’, whose appearance contradicts its name, is one of the oldest and well-preserved churches in the state. Cheriapally is located on the way to Kumarakom from Kottayam. The church is dedicated to mother Mary. Kottayam Cheriapally, built in 1579, has retained its old world charm today as well even after so much of environmental changes. The length and breadth of the church is constructed with innovative paintings, mural, and architecture. Before the inception of the Old Seminary in 1815, Kottayam Cheriapally was the Headquarters of the Church and Malankara Metropolitans for a long time.

== History ==
Many stories and legends regarding the establishment and evolution of Christianity in Central Travancore surrounds this church. The legend is that the Thekkumkore (old Kottayam) kings were glad that Christians were living in their kingdom, as they were committed towards working hard to earn a living, and thus had taken the entire responsibility of their security.King Goda Varman Manikandan, who was ruling the kingdom during that period(1579 - 1606 C.E.), provided them land for constructing the church, without levying tax. A church was first built in 1550 and named Valiyapally. However, the congregation later split on ethnic lines and the dissidents built Cheriapally in 1579. It is said that two worship places were not permitted in a single village and thus the king had to divide the village into two so that both the churches could exist. The church was built by Portuguese architect Antony and his team along with the craftsmen of the Thekkumkore Kingdom (old Kottayam) in 1579. However, the Portuguese had no influence on the mode of worship in the church. It is typically dedicated to Syrian Christians. While visiting Cheriapally, one may feel that the architecture greatly resembles that of some temples in Kerala. However, the fact is that during those days, the mode of building every place of worship was the same, irrespective of it being a temple or a church. Kottayam's iconic Cheriapally Mahaedavaka is an architectural marvel and a repository of legends.

== Holy Girdle of St. Mary ==
Kottayam Cheriapally has the unique distinction of being the first church in India to get the Relics of St. Mary (a small part of the Holy girdle of St. Mary) installed at the church. This relic is also known as the Soonoro or Holy belt of St. Mary. The Holy girdle was presented by Ignatius Yaqub III, the Patriarch of Antioch to Baselios Augen I, the then Catholicos of the East and Malankara Metropolitan who ceremoniously installed it at Kottayam Cheriapally on 16 January 1966. The holy girdle is kept in the church and is taken out for public viewing from 10th August to 15th August every year during the 15 days fast to commemorate the Assumption of St. Mary.

== Kottayam Cheriapally Murals ==
Built in the Portuguese-Baroque-Keralite style, the mural art on the church interiors depicts the major incidents in Jesus Christ's life. The eastern side of the church wall portrays the major happenings in the life of the Lord's mother. Some of the paintings depict the trial of Christ, Crucifixion, and Christ being taken down from the cross. The ceiling with 99 tiles is adorned with various paintings. Historians said that these were painted by foreign artists. Interestingly, the clothes worn by the people in the paintings are also European in style. Though the paintings are in European style, some experts claim the technique used is that of artists from Kerala. All the paintings have been created by only using organic dyes from vegetables and flowers. The red colour seen in the paintings are drawn using Red brick. People from different countries visit the church to study these paintings. Several of the wall paintings had faded with the passage of time. The centuries-old mural paintings have been restored to their former glory by mural painting artist V.M. Jiju Lal and team after a hard work for three months. The rare paintings, which are believed to be more than 300 years old, inside the Sanctuary (madbaha) of the church were brought back without losing their aesthetic quality. The consecration of the Sanctuary after the restorations of the mural paintings, was done on 11 January 2020.

== Architecture ==
The church exhibits a blend of Kerala and Portuguese styles of architecture. The roof of the portico is supported by ten granite pillars and has a large lotus carved out of a single piece of granite. The baptism basin inside the church has been chiselled from a single stone. Other features of Kottayam Cheriapally include Anappalla (elephant belly) style compound wall and characteristics of ancient temples in Kerala. The walls around the church are over one meter thick and are strongly influenced by Hindu temple architecture. The niches in the walls accommodate hundreds of oil lamps.

== Metropolitans from Kottayam Cheriapally ==
Geevarghese Mar Dionysius III (1777 - 19 May 1825), also known as Punnathra Mar Dionysius, the 11th Malankara Metropolitan, Late Lamented Dr. Philipose Mar Theophilose (9 May 1911 - 28 September 1997) also known as the Ambassador of the Malankara Church and Yuhanon Mar Athanasios (21 March 1928 - 12 October 1980) also known as Abo Yuhanon were both interred at Kottayam Cheriapally Cemetary where they remained buried.

Geevarghese Mar Dionysius III, also known as Punnathra Mar Dionysius, was born as Kurien in 1785 in the well known Punnathra family, Kottayam. Soon after his ordination as a priest, Kurien Kathanar was appointed at Kallumkathra Church. It was his suggestion during the time of Mar Thoma IX to establish the Syrian Seminary at Kottayam, Kerala's first educational institution. In 1816, following the demise of Mar Dionysius II (Pulikottil Joseph Mar Dionysius), Punnathra Kurien Ramban was elected to succeed him as the Malankara Metropolitan by the general assembly of the Church (Malankara palli-yogam) and was elevated as a bishop on 19 October 1817. Punnathra Mar Dionysius was the 11th Malankara Metropolitan of the church. During the time of Punnathara Mar Dionysius, the relation with Travancore and Cochin was very cordial. The Ruler of Travancore Rani Gouri Parvathi Bhai, gave a number of privileges to the Seminary. For the first time in Travancore in 1818, the Maharani appointed a number of Christians as Judges. He encouraged Anglican Missionary Benjamin Bailey to translate the Bible and helped Norton to spread the Word. He also welcomed some of the first missionary teachers who arrived from England to teach in the seminary at Kottayam. Punnathra Mar Dionysius died on 19 May 1825, and was interred at Kottayam Cheriapally.

Late Lamented Dr. Philipose Mar Theophilose was born on 9 May 1911 in Kallupurakkal family, Puthanangadi, Kottayam. He completed B.A degree from Maharaja's College, Kochi. He studied M.A in St.Augustine of Canterbury, England, T.H.M in Cardiff University, United Kingdom, and D.D from Harvard University in Massachusetts, USA. He became a deacon in 1929 and ordained as a priest in 1944. He was long time vicar of Kottayam Cheriappally. He started two schools: St. Thomas school in Puthenagadi and St. John's High school Ellikkal under the auspices of Kottayam Chriapally and also acquired other properties for the church. Being consecrated as Metropolitan on 24 August 1966, Mar Theophilos served the Angamaly and Bombay dioceses. He was the Principal of the Orthodox Theological Seminary, Kottayam (Old Seminary) and was the architect of the revamped Seminary. Mar Theophilos' 30 years term as the President of the Mar Gregorios Orthodox Christian Students Movement (MGOCSM) is known as the Golden Period of the organisation. Mar Theophilos was known as the Ambassador of the Malankara Orthodox Church during his lifetime. He was the founder member of the World Council of Churches(WCC). He worked as Secretary of Faith and Order division and central committee member of the WCC. Mar Theophilos was highly honoured by Eastern Orthodox churches. He was the only one special invitee to attend the consecration of Pimen I, Patriarch of Moscow and All Russia. He was given a grand honour when he was invited to attend the Republic Day parade of Romania as chief guest along with the President of Romania and the Patriarch of Romania. Mar Theophilos died on 28 September 1997, and was entombed in Thrikunnath Seminary, Aluva in Kerala.

Yuhanon Mar Athanasios, also known as Abo Yuhanon was born on 21 March 1928 in the Chackalaparampil family, Puthenangadi, Kottayam and was named as Mani (C.V. Mani). He completed his studies at CMS School Chalukunnu, Kottayam and CMS college, Kottayam. After his academic education, he worked as a tutor in St.Thomas College, Pala. Later he resigned the job and there after joined the Bethany Asram at Perunad, Ranni on 21 May 1953. He was ordained as Deacon on 15 June 1956 by Baselios Geevarghese II, then Catholicos of the East and Malankara Metropolitan and on the very next day Geevarghese II himself ordained Dn. Yuhanon as Fr. Yuhanon at Orthodox Theological Seminary Kottayam. He later served as the superior of Bethany Asram. He was known as a great retreat father of his time. Baselios Marthoma Mathews I, Catholicos of the East consecrated him as Yuhanon Mar Athanasios at Pazhanji Church on 15 May 1978, along with four others. Mar Athanasios was the youngest of all the bishops at the time. He became the assistant Metropolitan of Kottayam Diocese. Mar Athanasios entered his eternal abode on 12 October 1980, and was laid to rest at Bethany Asram.

== Church feast ==
The Dormition of Mother Mary or holy Theotokos occupies the most important place in the Orthodox Church next to that of Jesus Christ. It is indeed a great feast which depicts ‘falling asleep’ of the Mother of God and taking her body up into heaven by angels. The Feast of the Dormition of St. Mary (Vaangippu Perunnal or Shoonoyo Perunnal) is observed in this church on August 15. The feast of Dormition is celebrated by two weeks of fasting, known as the Dormition fast, beginning from 1 August to 15 August which draws many people from far and wide. The annual feast of the church (Feast of St. Mary) falls on January 15 and is known as Vithukalude Perunnal which means ‘the festival of seeds’. It is observed to invoke the blessings of Virgin Mary upon the agricultural seeds.

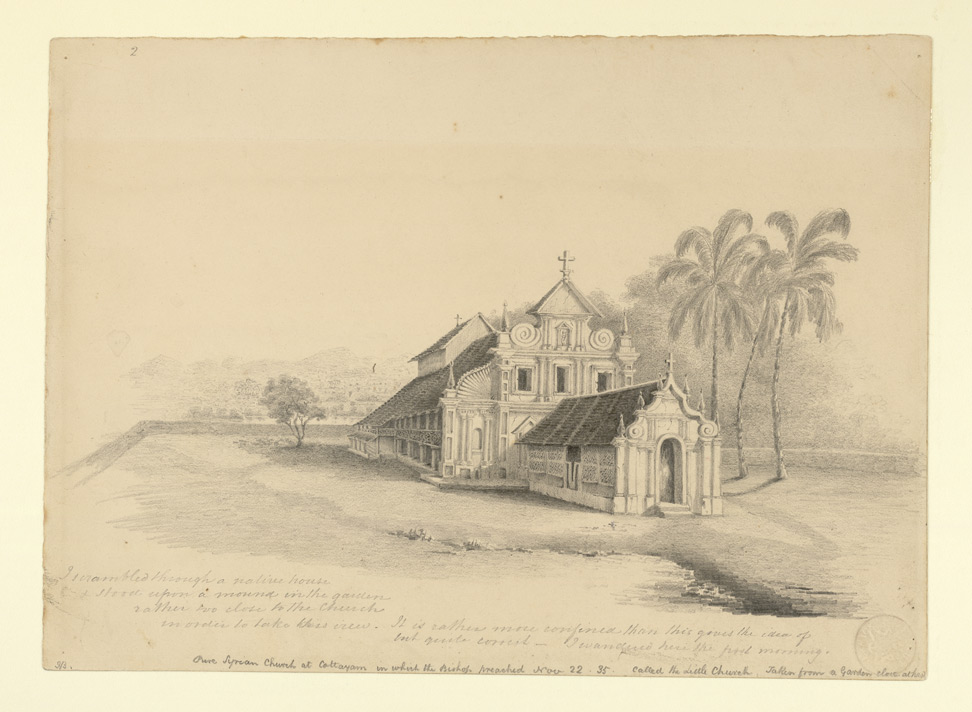
A pencil drawing of the church by Bateman in 1835

== See also ==
- Malankara Orthodox Syrian Church
- Kottayam Central Orthodox Diocese
- Kottayam Orthodox Diocese
