= Kollanoor family =

St. Thomas Christian family

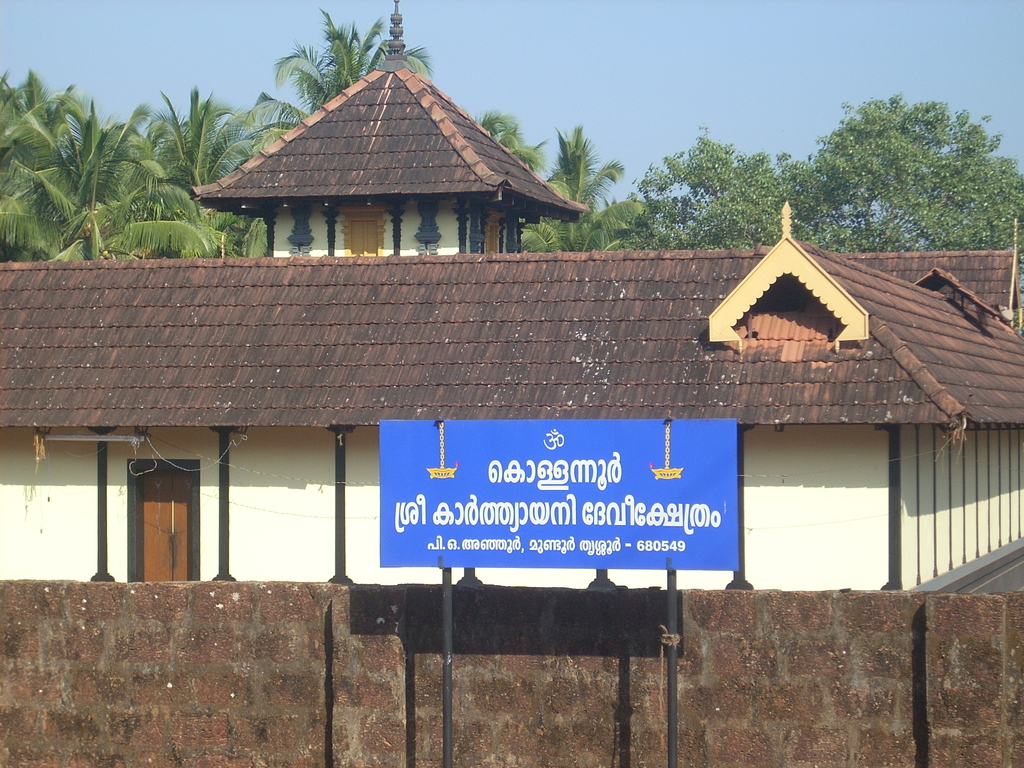
Kollanoor Bhagawathy Temple

The Kollanoor, Kollanore or Kollannur is widely known Saint Thomas Christian family name. They originated in and around Palayoor, a village near Chavakkad in Thrissur District in Kerala, India and many migrated to Kunnamkulam.

== History ==
=== Hindu Kollanoor families ===
The Hindu Kollanoor family members hail from Kaiparambu (Thaikaadu) area near Thrissur. They are Namboothiri in caste (Malayali Brahmin) and now also worship in the family temple named Kollanoor Bhagawathy Temple, Anjoor, Near Mundoor.

Kollanoor Mana (കൊള്ളന്നൂർ മണം) is a traditional Namboothiri Brahmin illam (ancestral household) located in the Thrissur district of Kerala, near Vellarakkad in the broader Kunnamkulam–Thrissur region. It is regarded as one of the old manas of central Kerala and is historically noted for its association with ritual and spiritual authority. Families such as Kollanoor Mana traditionally served as hereditary temple ritual specialists, performing sacred ceremonies and supervising the religious and administrative functions of nearby temples. The illam is associated with the worship of Goddess Karthyayani Devi.

It is traditionally believed that majority members of the Kollanoor family converted to Christianity through the evangelisation of St Thomas the Apostle.

=== Christian Kollanoor families ===
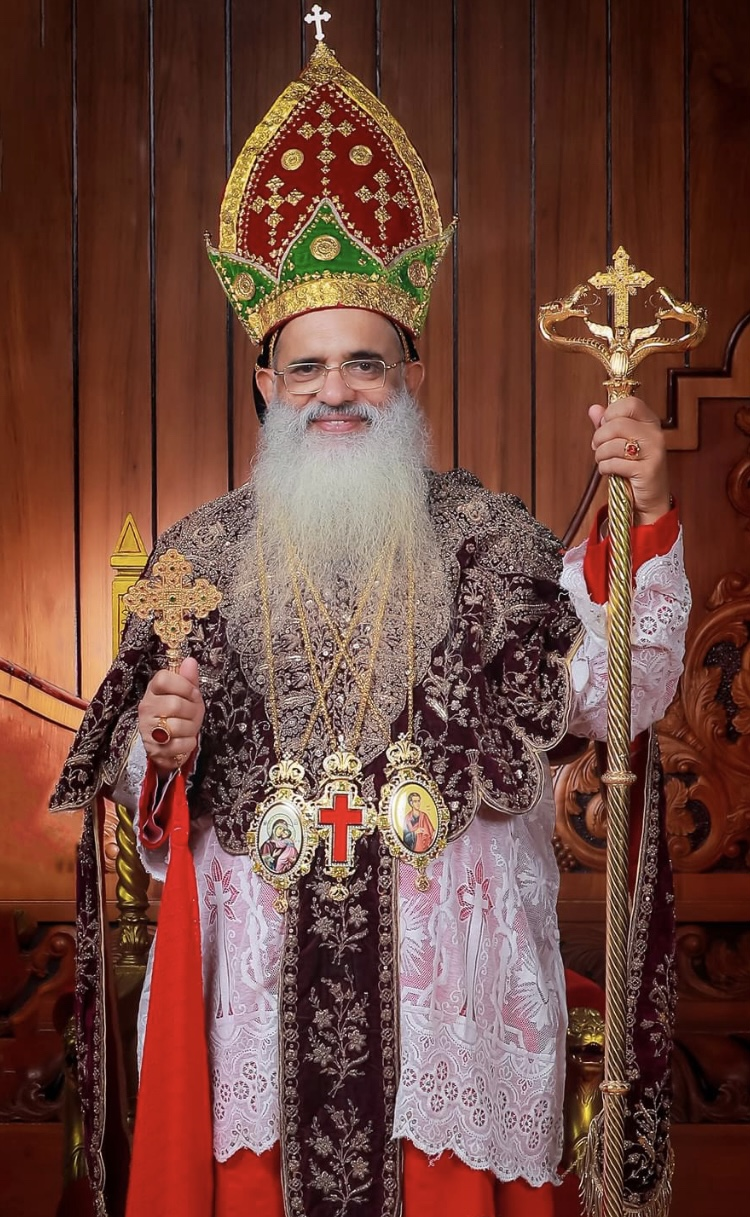
91st Catholicos of the East and the Supreme Head of the Indian Orthodox Church.

Although the family name is spawned among Hindu religion, the majority of family members are now Christians. They belong to prominent families that claim to be evangelized by Thomas the Apostle at Palayoor in the present day Thrissur district.

During an assault by Tippu Sultan in Kunnamkulam, the men (except the firstborns, who were considered as legal heirs) were sent to fight with Sultan's army and was brutally killed in the battleground which is now known as "Kollanoor Chantha" (കൊള്ളന്നുർ ചന്ത) near Perumpilavu. They refused conversion and became martyrs. The rest of the family members were rescued by Cochin Kingdom and were relocated in and around Thrissur in areas such as Palayoor, Kunnamkulam, Pazhanji, Pengamuck, Velapaya, Avanoor, Koonamoochi, Parappur, Mattom, Kechery, etc.

Baselios Mar Thoma Paulose II who was the 91st reigning Catholicos of the East and the Supreme Head of the Indian Orthodox Church belongs to Kollanoor family from Mangad.

== Notable people ==
Baselios Mar Thoma Paulose II 91st Catholicos of the East and the Supreme Head of the Indian Orthodox Church.

== See also ==
- List of Saint Thomas Christians
