= Ahmedabad Orthodox Diocese =

Orthodox Christian diocese

Diocese of Ahmedabad

Orthodox
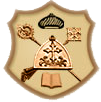
- Catholicate Emblem

Location
- Country: India
- Territory: Ahmedabad
- Metropolitan: H. G. Geevarghese Mar Theophilos
- Headquarters: St Mary’s Higher Secondary School Campus, Naroda, Ahmedabad, Gujarat India 382 330

Information
- First holder: Geevarghese Mar Yulios
- Rite: Malankara Rite
- Established: 2010
- Diocese: Ahmedabad Diocese
- Parent church: Malankara Orthodox Syrian Church

Website
- Ahmedabad Diocese

Ahmedabad Diocese is one of the 32 diocese of the Malankara Orthodox Syrian Church also known as the Indian Orthodox Church located at Ahmedabad, Gujarat.

== History ==
The diocese of Ahmedabad came into existence in 2009. The diocese was administered by the Catholicose and assisted by H.G. Geevarghese Mar Coorilos, Metropolitan of the Mumbai Diocese. The Diocese of Ahmedabad was formally inaugurated on 3 October 2009 by H.G. Dr. Mathews Mar Severios Metropolitan, Secretary to the Holy Episcopal Synod.

H.G. Dr. Geevarghese Mar Yulios took charge of the Diocesan Metropolitan on 15 August 2010.

== Diocesan Metropolitan ==
List of Diocesan Metropolitan
From	Until	Metropolitan	Notes
2010	Present	Geevarghese Mar Yulios	Took charge on 15 August 2010 from the In-charge Metropolitan H.G. Geevarghese Mar Coorilos.

== List of Parishes ==
The area covered by the diocese include the state of Gujarat, Rajasthan, Madhya Pradesh and 4 parishes from Sultanate of Oman.

=== Madhya Pradesh ===
- St. Mary's Orthodox Congregation, Punasa, Madhaya Pradesh
- St. George Orthodox Church, Nagda, Dewas, Madhya Pradesh
- St. Gregorios Orthodox Church, Khandwa, Madhya Pradesh
- St. Gregorios Orthodox Church, Ujjain, Madhya Pradesh
- St. Mary's Orthodox Church, Indore, Madhya Pradesh
- St. Mary's Orthodox Church, Dewas, Madhya Pradesh
- St. Gregorios Orthodox Church, Mhow, Pithampur, Madhya Pradesh

=== Rajasthan ===
- St. George Orthodox Church, Chittorgarh, Rajasthan
- St. Gregorious Orthodox Church, Dungarpur, Rajasthan
- St. Gregorios Orthodox Church, Udaipur, Rajasthan
- St. Mary's Orthodox Church, Bhilwara, Rajasthan
- St. Stephen's Orthodox Congregation, Gangapur, Rajasthan
- St. Mary's Orthodox Church, Kota, Rajasthan
- St. Stephen's Orthodox Church, Pratapgarh, Rajasthan
- St. Thomas Orthodox Church, Abu Road, Rajasthan
- St. Thomas Orthodox Church, Banswara, Rajasthan

=== Gujarat ===
- Anand St.Thomas Orthodox Church
- Ahmedabad St.Marys Orthodox Cathedral
- Bharuch St.George Orthodox Church
- Baroda Mar Gregorios Orthodox Valiyapali
- Bhavanagar St.Thomas Orthodox Church
- Ghandhidham St.Stephens Orthodox Church
- Gandhinagar Mar Gregorios Orthodox Church
- Halol St.Thomas Orthodox Church
- Jamnagar Mar Gregorios Orthodox Church
- Kalol St.George Orthodox Church
- Mehasana Mar Gregorios
- Nadiad St.peters and St.pauls Orthodox Church
- Porbandar St.Gregorios Orthodox Church
- Rajkot St.Thomas Orthodox Church
- Veraval St.Marys Orthodox Church

=== Sultanate of Oman ===
- Mar Gregorios Orthodox Maha Edavaka, Muscat, Sultanate of Oman
- St. George Orthodox Church, Sohar, Sultanate of Oman
- St. Stephen's Orthodox Church, Salalah, Sultanate of Oman
- St. Mary's Orthodox Church, Ghala, Muscat, Sultanate of Oman
