= Ahmedabad Diocese =

Diocese of Ahmedabad may refer to:

- Ahmedabad Orthodox Diocese
- Roman Catholic Diocese of Ahmedabad
