= Athanasius Paulose =

19th and 20th-century Jacobite Syrian patriarch and saint

Saint Mor Athanasius Paulose
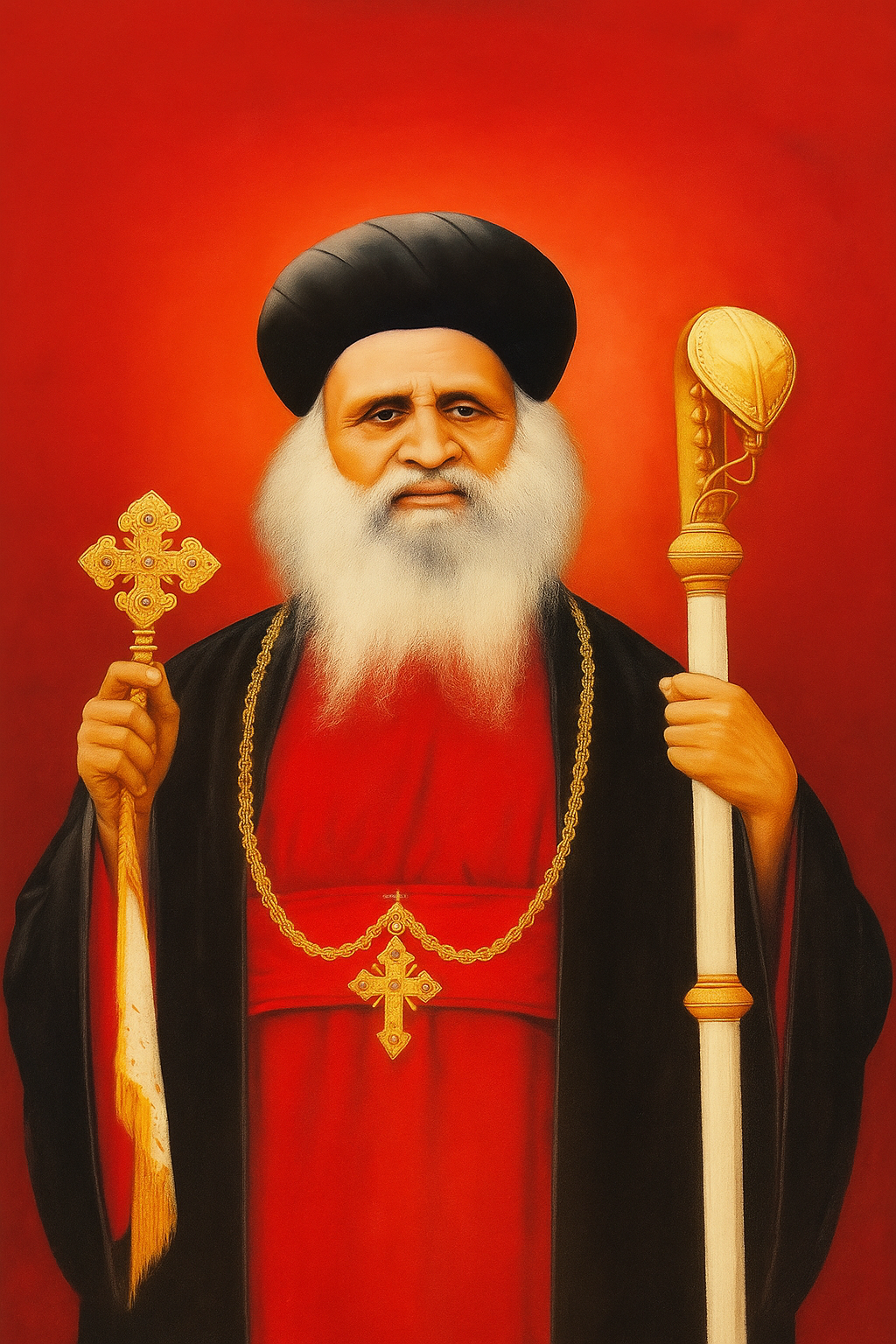
- Portrait of Mor Athanasius

"Snugaro d' hymonooso" (The Protector of Faith)
- Born: Paulose Kuttikatt; 23 January 1869; Angamali
- Hometown: Akaparambu
- Residence: Thrikkunathu Seminary
- Died: 25 January 1953 (aged 84); Thrikkunathu Seminary
- Venerated in: Jacobite Syrian Orthodox Church; Oriental Orthodox Christianity
- Canonized: 19 August 2004, Cathedral of Saint George, Damascus by Patriarch Ignatius Zakka I Iwas, Syriac Orthodox Church.
- Major shrine: St. Mary's Church, Thrikkunnathu Seminary; Patriarchal Cathedral of Mor Athanasius, Puthencruz
- Feast: 26 January
- Patronage: Jacobite Syrian Orthodox Church

Mar Athanasius
- Malankara Metropolitan and Valiya Metropolitan of Alwaye
- Predecessor: Mor Coorilos Paulose
- Successor: Mor Clemis Abraham
- Other post: Metropolitan of Angamaly

Orders
- Rank: Malankara Metropolitan

Personal details
- Denomination: Oriental Orthodox

Mor Athanasius Paulose, popularly known as Aluvayile Valiya Thirumeni, was a Syriac Orthodox bishop who served the 18th Malankara Metropolitan of the Malankara Syriac Orthodox Church from 1918 to 1953 and also the Metropolitan of the Angamaly Diocese of the Malankara Syriac Orthodox Church.

The Feast of Mor Athanasius is held annually on 26 January.

== Career ==
On 25 November 1898, Valiya Thirumeni was ordained as a priest (Qashisho) by Saint Geevarghese Mar Gregorios Chathuruthiyil. On 28 November, he was elevated to monk (ramban).

In December 1917, head of the Patriarch faction, Kochuparambil Paulose Mor Koorilos, died; Valiya Thirumeni was selected to lead the Patriarch Faction of Malankara Church. He took office in January 1918.

== Death ==
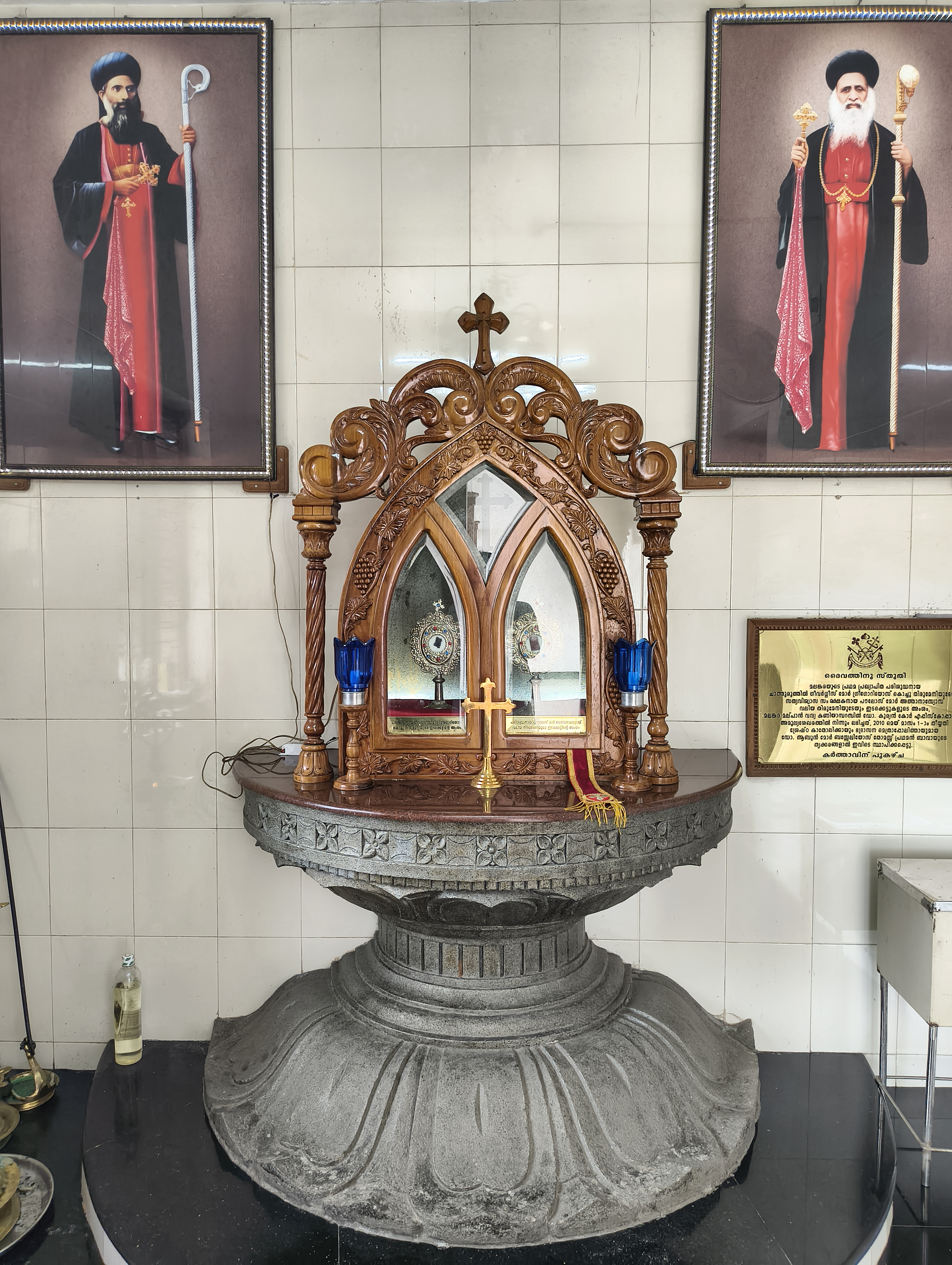
The prayer room of Vilangu St. Mary's Church kept the Holy relics of Parumala Mor Gregorious and Mor Athanasius Paulose

Valiya Thirumeni died on 25 January 1953 at the age of 84. The next day he was buried at the northern side of the madbho (altar) of St. Mary's Church in Thrikkunnathu Seminary.

== Gallery ==
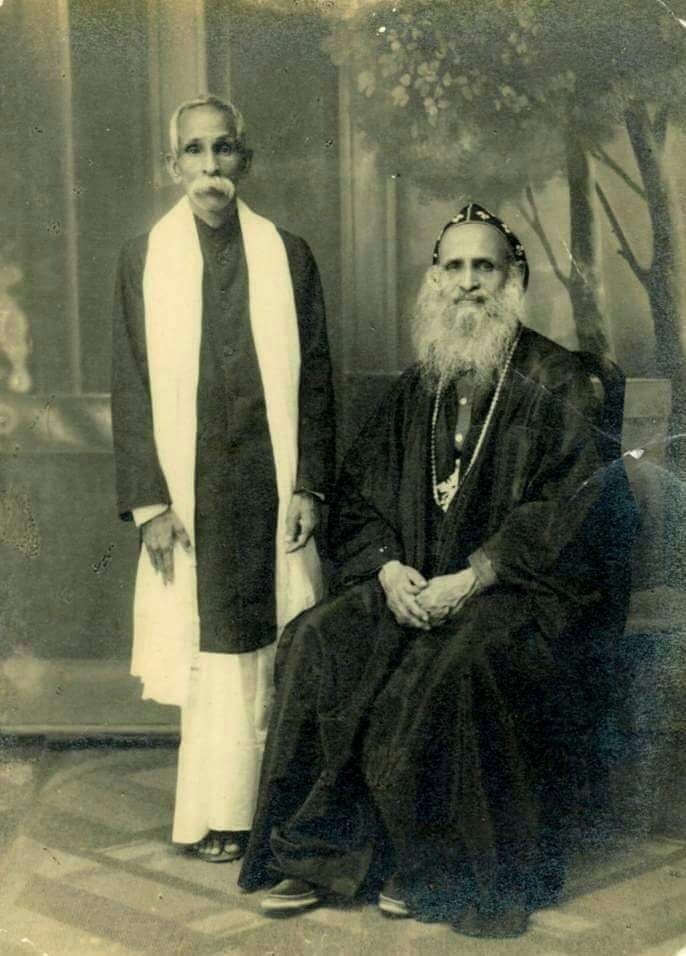
Mor Paulose Athanasius and a layman

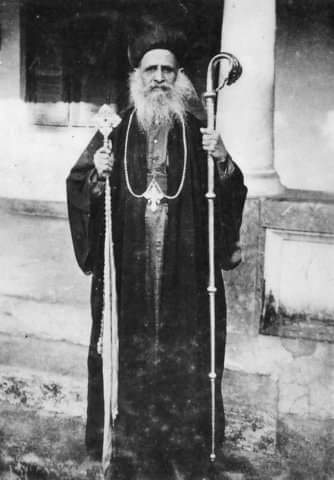
Photograph of Mor Athanasius Paulose

'Malankara Syriac Orthodox Church Titles
Preceded by Mor Coorilos Paulose	Malankara Metropolitan of Jacobite Syrian Christian Church; 1918–1953	Succeeded by Mor Clemis Abraham
