= Geevarghese Ivanios (Malankara Orthodox) =

His Grace Geevarghese Mar Ivanios
- Metropolitan of Kottayam
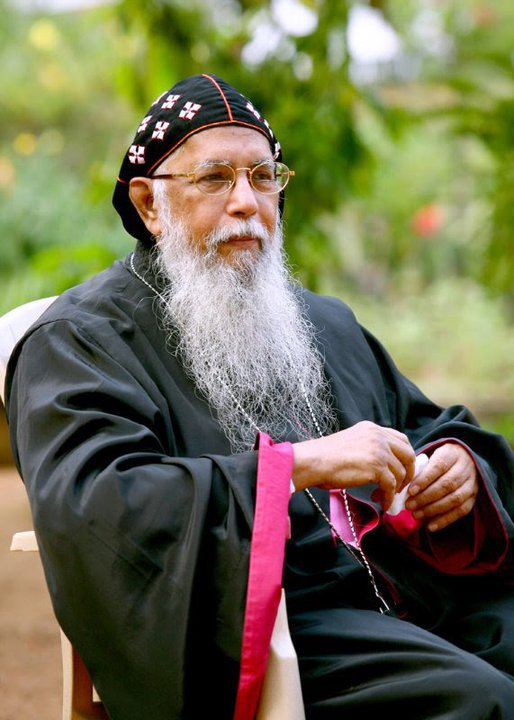
- Church: Malankara Orthodox Syrian Church

Orders
- Consecration: May 15, 1985

Personal details
- Born: George; November 14, 1940
- Died: April 12, 2013 (aged 72)
- Buried: Mar Baselios Dayara, Njaliyakuzhy, Kottayam
- Education: Oxford University

Geevarghese Mar Ivanios (14 November 1940 – 12 April 2013) was a Metropolitan of the Malankara Orthodox Syrian Church. He was an eminent theologian, writer, and spiritual teacher of the Church.

== Early life ==
George was born to K. George and Annamma on 14 November 1940 in Madurai. His parents were Mar Thoma Protestants, and the family relocated to Kollam when George was four. During his college days, he drew close to the Malankara Orthodox Syrian Church and developed a personal relation with Met. Mathews Mar Coorilos of Kollam (later Baselios Marthoma Mathews II). Shortly afterwards, at the age of twenty-one, George received chrismation and became a member of the Church. He was ordained as a deacon in March 1963 by Mar Coorilos, and left for England, where he lived among the Cowley Fathers and obtained M.A. in Christian Theology from the Oxford University.

== Priesthood ==
He returned to Kerala in 1971 after being invited by Philipose Mar Theophilos to teach Hebrew, Syriac, and Greek at the Orthodox Theological Seminary, Kottayam. George was ordained as priest by Mar Coorilos in December 1973 at the Seminary, where he taught for seven years. Diagnosed with cancer in 1978, he was treated and cured at Adyar Cancer Institute, Chennai. In March 1979, he was ordained as a hieromonk (ramban) by Baselios Marthoma Mathews I.

The Malankara Association on 28 December 1982 in Thiruvalla elected K. G. George Ramban along with four others to the office of the episcopate. Subsequently, on 15 May 1985, he was consecrated as Geevarghese Mar Ivanios at St. Mary's Orthodox Cathedral, Puthencavu, and appointed as Metropolitan of the Kottayam Diocese on 1 August 1985.

== Death ==
Mar Ivanios died on 12 April 2013. The funeral service led by Baselios Marthoma Paulose II took place on the next day, at Mar Baselios Dayara, Njaliyakuzhy.

== Works ==
- മൗനത്തിന്‍റെ ലാവണ്യം (Maunattiṉṟe Lāvaṇyaṁ; "Beauty of Silence").
- നിർലേപം (Nirlēpaṁ; "Untaintedness").
- ഹൃദയശുദ്ധീകരണം (Hr̥dayaśuddhīkaraṇaṁ; "Purification of the Heart").

=== Translations ===
- The Beauty of Silence, translated by Rincy Raju (Kottayam: Mashikkoottu, 2023).
