= Yuhanon Mar Dioscoros =

Malankara Orthodox Syrian Church bishop

His Grace Yuhanon Mar Dioscoros Metropolitan
- Church: Malankara Orthodox Syrian Church
- Diocese: Kottayam Diocese
- Appointed: 2009

Orders
- Consecration: 19 February 2009 by Baselios Marthoma Didymos I

Personal details
- Born: 28 May 1964 (age 62) Kerala, India

Yuhanon Mar Dioscoros is a bishop of the Malankara Orthodox Syrian Church who serves as Metropolitan of the Kottayam Diocese. He was consecrated as Metropolitan on 19 February 2009.

== Early life and education ==
According to the official church biography, Yuhanon Mar Dioscoros was born on 28 May 1964. He completed his secular and theological studies in Kerala and later became associated with the Orthodox Theological Seminary, Kottayam.

== Ordained ministry ==
He was elected bishop by the Malankara Syrian Christian Association on 11 September 2008. He was professed as a Ramban on 4 December 2008 by Baselios Marthoma Didymos I. He was ordained as bishop on 19 February 2009 at St. George Orthodox Church, Puthupally.

== Episcopal ministry ==
Yuhanon Mar Dioscoros serves as the Metropolitan of the Kottayam Diocese. He has also been listed as assistant metropolitan for the Kottayam Central Diocese and the Asia-Pacific Diocese.

He has held administrative responsibilities in the Church, including work connected with church publications, public relations, and educational institutions.

== Academic roles ==
Yuhanon Mar Dioscoros has served in academic positions at the Orthodox Theological Seminary, Kottayam, including as professor and dean of studies. He has also been associated with theological teaching and church formation programmes.

== Public activity ==
In 2020, he was reported in Indian media as having acted in his capacity as a church official in disciplinary action involving clergy of the Kottayam diocese.

== See also ==
- Malankara Orthodox Syrian Church
- Kottayam Orthodox Diocese
- List of metropolitans of the Indian Orthodox Church
