= St. Mary's Church Thrikkunnathu =

St. Mary's Orthodox Syrian Church, Thrikkunnathu, Aluva
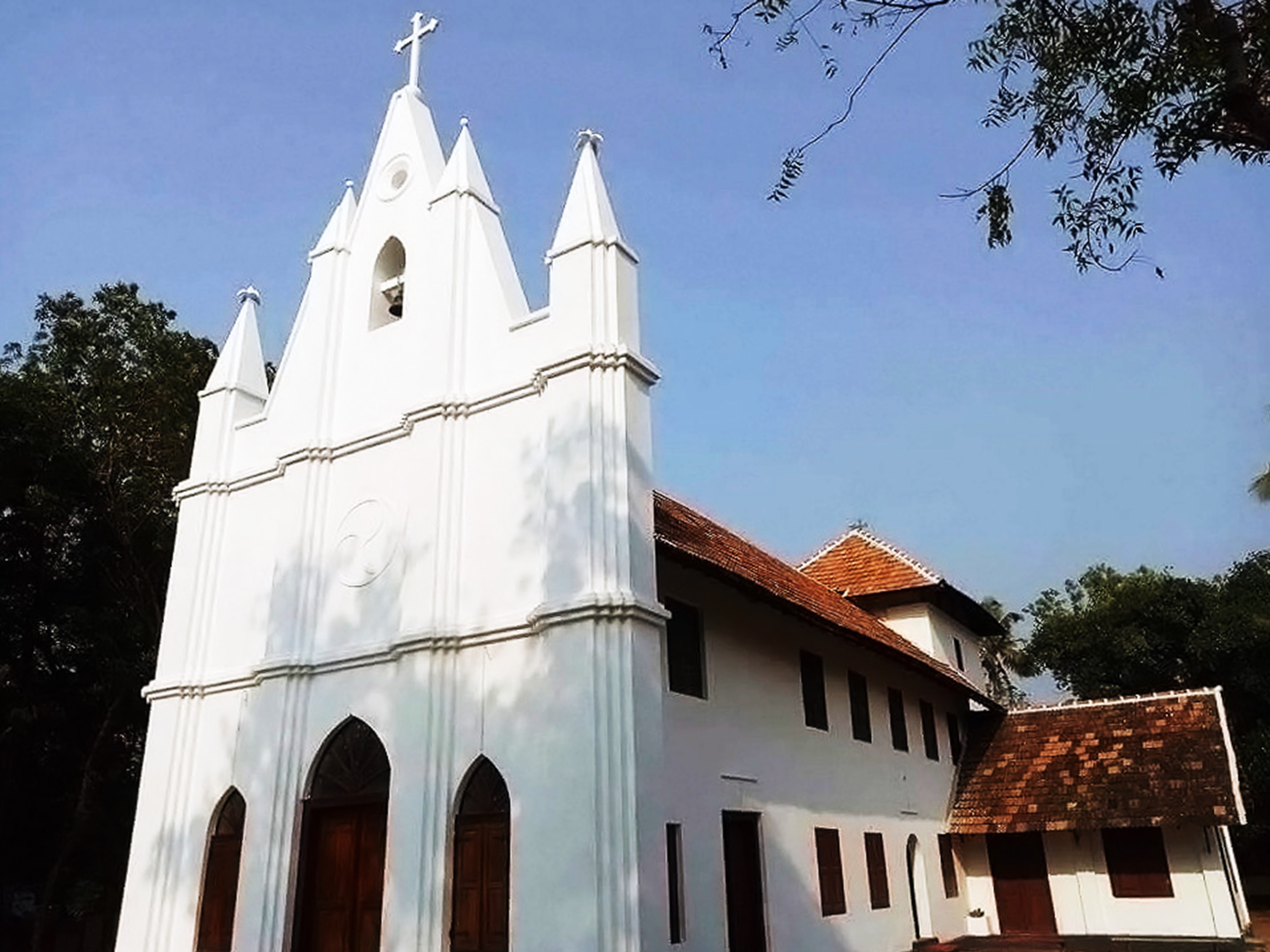

- St. Mary's Church, Thrikkunnathu, Aluva, Kerala
- 10.1030°N 76.3572°E
- Location: Aluva, Kerala
- Country: India
- Denomination: Malankara Orthodox Syrian Church

History
- Founded: 1880
- Dedication: St.Mary
- Consecrated: H.G Kuttikkattil Paulose Mar Athanasios ]] Valiya ThirumeH.G .G Geevarghese Mar Gregorios Vayaliparambil (1966) H.G Dr. Philipose Mor Theophilos(1997)

Architecture
- Functional status: Active
- Heritage designation: Malankara Syrian Church
- Architectural type: Kerala Architecture
- Completed: 1932
- Closed: 1977 for (40 Years) Due to the dispute between Jacobite Syriac Christian Church and Malankara Orthodox Syrian Church

Administration
- Diocese: Angamaly Diocese

Thrikkunnathu St. Mary's Orthodox Syrian Church, is a church that is part of the Angamaly Diocese of the Malankara Orthodox Syrian Church. The church belongs to Thrikkunnathu Seminary, the headquarters of the Angamaly Diocese. It is located near the town of Aluva, in the Ernakulam district of Kerala.

The Seminary was closed for 40 years due to factional authority disputes between the Jacobite Society and the Malankara Orthodox Syrian Church. Following a Supreme Court verdict, the Seminary is controlled and administered by the Malankara Orthodox Syrian Church.

== Early Church ==
In 1880 the Malankara Syrian Church acquired 18 acres (73,000 m^{2}) of land for construction of the church and a cornerstone was laid in 1889. The church began as a small building thatched with coconut leaves in the early 1900s. Paulose Mar Athanasius built the current St Mary's Church in the early 1930s. The western side of the building was extended in 1964. Patriarchs of Antioch, Ignatius Abded Aloho II, St.Ignatius Elias III and Ignatius Jacob III had visited this church in 1911, 1931 and 1964.

St Mary's Church at Thrikkunnathu Seminary in Aluva, 2009.

== Tombs ==
- H.G Kadavil Paulose Mar Athanasios (1907)
- H.G Kuttikkattil Paulose Mar Athanasios (1953)
- H.G Vayalipparambil Geevarghese Mar Gregorios (1966)
- H.G Kallupurackal Dr. Philipose Mar Theophilos (1997)
