= Kunnamkulam Orthodox Diocese =

Diocese of the Malankara Orthodox Syrian Church

Diocese of Kunnamkulam

Orthodox
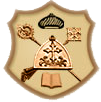
- Catholicate Emblem

Location
- Country: India
- Territory: Kunnamkulam
- Metropolitan: Geevarghese Mar Yulios
- Headquarters: Bishop's House, Arthat, Kunnamkulam- 680 521

Information
- First holder: Paulose Milithios (Baselios Marthoma Paulose II).
- Rite: Malankara Rite
- Established: 01 August 1985
- Diocese: Kunnamkulam Diocese
- Parent church: Malankara Orthodox Syrian Church

Website
- Kunnamkulam Diocese

Kunnamkulam Diocese is one of the 32 dioceses of Malankara Orthodox Syrian Church. Its headquarters is situated at Arthat in Kunnamkulam.

== History ==
The Kunnamkulam Diocese was formed on 10 March 1985, and was announced by Baselios Marthoma Mathews I, Catholicose of the East and Malankara Metropolitan through the Kalpana No. 52/1985 dated 8 March 1985. This Diocese was established with churches dividing from Cochin Diocese. Paulose Milithios (later Baselios Marthoma Paulose II) became elevated the first metropolitan of the Kunnamkulam diocese on 25 October 1991.

== Diocesan Metropolitans ==
Diocesan Metropolitan
From	Until	Metropolitan	Notes
01-Aug-1985	12-Jul-2021	Paulose Mar Milithios (Later Baselios Marthoma Paulose II)	1st Metropolitan of the diocese
03-Nov-2022	Incumbent	Geevarghese Mar Yulios	2nd Metropolitan of the diocese

Assistant Metropolitan
From	Until	Metropolitan	Notes
	03-Nov-2022	Geevarghese Mar Yulios	Assistant metropolitan

== List of Parishes ==
List of Churches under Kunnamkulam Orthodox Diocese

- Aduputty St. George Orthodox Church
- Akkikkavu St. Mary's Orthodox Church
- Arthat St. Mary's Puthenpally
- Arthat, Kunnamkulam St. Mary's Cathedral
- Aynoor St. George Orthodox Church
- Ayyamparambu St. Mary's Orthodox Church
- Chelakkara St. George Orthodox Church
- Chiralayam St.Lazarus Orthodox Church
- Chiramanegad St. Gregorios Orthodox Church
- Chittanjoor St. Mary's Orthodox Church
- Chowannoor St. Gregorios Orthodox Church
- Erumapetty St. George Orthodox Church
- Eyyal St. Thomas Orthodox Church
- Karikkad St. Mary's Orthodox Church
- Kattakampal St.Ignatius Orthodox Church
- Kondazhi St. George Orthodox Church
- Kottapadi St. George Orthodox Church
- Kottol St. Gregorios Orthodox Church
- Kunnamkulam, East Bazar St. Thomas Orthodox Church
- Kunnamkulam, Main Road St. Gregorios Orthodox Church
- Kunnamkulam, Parayil St. George Orthodox Church
- Kunnamkulam, South Bazar St.Mathias Orthodox Church
- Kunnamkulam, St. Lazarus Pazhayapally
- Manalithara St.John's Orthodox Church
- Mangad Mar Gregorios Orthodox Church
- Marathencode St. Gregorios Orthodox Church
- Mookkuthala St.John's Orthodox Church
- Ottupara St. George Orthodox Church
- Panamkutty St. Thomas Orthodox Church
- Parambai St. George Orthodox Church
- Pattambi St. Mary's Orthodox Church
- Pazhanji St. Mary's Cathedral
- Pengamuck Mar Baselius & Mar Gregorios Orthodox Church
- Perumthuruthi Mar Baselios Orthodox Church
- Thiruvilwamala St. George Orthodox Church
- Vattully St.Peter's & St.Paul's Orthodox Church
- Vyssery St. Gregorios Orthodox Church

== See also ==
- Malankara Orthodox Syrian Church
- Baselios Marthoma Paulose II
