= Vellarakkad, Thrissur =

Vellarakkad
- village
- Country: India
- State: Kerala
- District: Thrissur

Population (2011)
  - Total: 5,771

Languages
  - Official: Malayalam, English
- Time zone: UTC+5:30 (IST)
- PIN: 680584
- Vehicle registration: KL-
- Climate: hot and humid (Köppen)

Vellarakkad is a village in Thrissur district in the state of Kerala, India.

== Demographics ==
As of 2011 India census, Vellarakkad had a population of 5771 with 2753 males and 3018 females.
