= Thomas Mar Athanasius (Orthodox Bishop) =

Orthodox Bishop

His Grace Dr. Thomas Mar Athanasius
- Metropolitan of Kandanad East Diocese
- Church: Malankara Orthodox Syrian Church
- Diocese: Kandanad East Orthodox Diocese
- See: Catholicate of the East

Orders
- Consecration: 1990 by HH Ignatius Zakka I, Patriarch of Antioch

H. G. Dr. Thomas Mar Athanasius is the current Metropolitan of the Kandanad East Diocese of the Malankara Orthodox Syrian Church.
