= Kandanad East Orthodox Diocese =

Diocese of the Malankara Orthodox Syrian Church in India

Diocese of Kandanad East

Orthodox
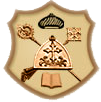
- Catholicate Emblem

Location
- Country: India
- Territory: Kandanad
- Metropolitan: H. G. Thomas Mar Athanasius
- Headquarters: Bishop's House, Cathedral Road, Muvattupuzha-686 661

Information
- First holder: Thomas Mar Athanasius
- Rite: Malankara Rite
- Established: 20 March 2002
- Diocese: Kandanad East Diocese
- Parent church: Malankara Orthodox Syrian Church

Website
- Kandanad East Diocese

Kandanad East Diocese is one of the 32 dioceses of Malankara Orthodox Syrian Church. Its headquarters is situated at Muvattupuzha.

== History ==
Kandanad Diocese, one of the oldest dioceses of the Orthodox Syrian Church, was established following the historical Synod of 1599 in Udayamperoor and later became one of the seven dioceses (Angamaly, Kandanadu, Kochi, Kollam, Kottayam, Niranam, and Thumpamon) formed by the Mulanthuruthy synod in 1876.

The Kandanad Diocese was initially spread across the districts of Kottayam, Idukki, and Ernakulam. According to the recommendation of the managing committee elected by the Malankara Association held on 20 March 2002 at Parumala as per the direction of the Apex Cour, the Kandanad Diocese was divided into two – Kandanad East Diocese and Kandanad West Diocese.

Following the Supreme Court verdict on the Malankara Sabah case, fully imbibing its thrust and spirit, The Diocese of Kandanad under the Diocesan Metropolitan Thomas Mar Athanasius declared allegiance to the Malankara Orthodox Syrian Church Constitution of 1934 and started working with the Church-leadership for unity and peace in the Church.

== Diocesan Metropolitans ==
Diocesan Metropolitan
From	Until	Metropolitan	Notes
20-Mar-2002	Incumbent	Thomas Mar Athanasius	1st Metropolitan of the diocese

== List of Parishes ==
List of Churches under Kandanad East Orthodox Diocese

- Aaroor St. Mary's Marygiri Orthodox Church
- Edayar St. Mary's Orthodox Church
- Idukki St. Mary's Orthodox Church
- Kanniattunirappu St. John's Orthodox Church
- Karicode St. Thomas Bethel Orthodox Church
- Kathipparathadom St. George Orthodox Church
- Kayanad St. George's Orthodox Church
- Koothathukulam St. Stephen's Orthodox Church
- Kozhippilly St. Peter's & St. Paul's Orthodox Church
- Kurinji St. Peter's & St. Paul's Orthodox Church
- Mamalassery Mor Michael Orthodox Church
- Manid St. Kuriakose Orthodox Church
- Mannathoor St. George's Orthodox Church
- Marika St. Thomas Orthodox Church
- Mulakulam, Kottaramkunnu St. Mary's Church
- Mulappuram St. George's Orthodox Church
- Muvattupuzha St. Thomas Cathedral
- Neeramukal St. Peter's & St. Paul's Orthodox Church
- Nellikunnel St. Johns Church
- Njarakkad St. John's Orthodox Church
- Onakkoor Mar Ignatius Sehion Orthodox Church
- Ooramana st. George ’s Thabore Orthodox Church
- Palakuzha St. John's Orthodox Church
- Pancode St. John's Orthodox Church
- Pannoor St. John's Orthodox Church
- Parepeedika St. Peter's & St. Paul's Orthodox Church
- Periyampra St. George's Orthodox Church
- Piramadom St. John's Orthodox Church
- Piravom St. Mary's Valiyapally
- Poothrikka St. Mary's Orthodox Church
- South Paravoor St. John the Baptist Orthodox Church
- Thammanimattom St. Mary's Orthodox Church
- Thodpuzha St. Mary's Orthodox Church
- Vadakara St. John's Orthodox Church
- Varikkoli St. Mary's Orthodox Church
- Vethithara St. Mary's Orthodox Church
- Vettithara Mar Michael Orthodox Church

== See also ==
- Malankara Orthodox Syrian Church
- Baselios Marthoma Mathews II
