= Mathews Theodosius (Malankara bishop) =

Oriental Orthodox bishop

- Church: Malankara Orthodox Syrian Church
- Diocese: Idukki Orthodox Diocese
- In office: 2009 – Present

Orders
- Ordination: 19 Feb 2009

Personal details
- Born: 15 September 1955 (age 69); Edathua, Alapuzha

Mathews Theodosius is Metropolitan of Idukki Diocese of Malankara Orthodox Syrian Church.
