= Kottayam Orthodox Diocese =

Diocese of the Malankara Orthodox Syrian Church in India

Diocese of Kottayam

Orthodox
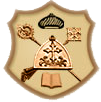
- Catholicate Emblem

Location
- Country: India
- Territory: Kottayam
- Metropolitan: H. G. Yuhanon Mar Dioscoros
- Headquarters: Mar Kuriakose Dayara, Pothenpuram PO, Pampady, Kottayam Dist., Kerala, India - 686 502

Information
- First holder: Kadavil Paulose Mar Athanasios
- Rite: Malankara Rite
- Established: 1876, by Ignatius Peter IV
- Diocese: Kottayam Diocese
- Parent church: Malankara Orthodox Syrian Church

Website
- Kottayam Diocese

Kottayam Diocese is one of the 32 dioceses of the Malankara Orthodox Syrian Church. The diocese was created in Mulanthuruthy Synod in 1876.

== History ==
Kottayam is one of the seven dioceses created after the Mulanthuruthi Christian association (synod) conducted under the leadership of Ignatius Peter IV, Patriarch of Antioch in 1876. Others are Kollam, Kandanadu, Angamali, Niranam, Thumpamon, Kochi. In initial time there were 20 churches in the diocese. Kadavil Paulose Mar Athanasios was the first Metropolitan. After this, Paulose Mar Evanios, later Baselios Paulose I become Metropolitan. Then, Geevarghese Mar Pilaxinos, later Baselios Geevarghese I, Vattaserill Mar Dionysius led the diocese. Kuriakos Mar Gregorios (Pampadi Thirumeni) led the diocese in the period of 1929–1965. In this time Pampady Daira become head office. Paret Mathews Mar Ivanios was appointed as Assistant Metropolitan in 1954 and as Metropolitan from 1965 to 1980. Joseph Mar Pacomios, Yuhanon Mar Athanasios led the diocese as assistant Metropolitans. In 1982 Kottayam diocese was divided into Kottayam, Kottayam Central and Idukki dioceses. In 1985 August, Geevarghese Mar Evanios become Metropolitan. In 1987, head office shifted to Kuriakos Mar Gregorios Centre. In 1992, there were 6 chapels, 70 parishes and one cathedral in the diocese.

== Now ==
Now, H.H Yuhanon Mar Dioscoros serving as the metropolitan bishop of Kottayam diocese. The head office of Kottayam diocese is situated in Kuriakose Mar Gregorios Centre, MD Seminary, Kottayam. There are numerous institutes work under this diocese. Pampadi Kuriakose Dayara, MGM Abhaya Bhavan, MGM Bala Bhavan, Mar Ivanios ITC, BMM English Medium school etc. are some of them. Some colleges of Malankara Church is in the boundary of this diocese.

== Diocesan Metropolitans ==
Kottayam Orthodox Diocesan Metropolitan
From	Until	Metropolitan	Notes
03-Dec-1876	02-Nov-1907	Kadavil Paulose Mar Athanasios	1st Metropolitan of the diocese
Unknown	02-May-1913	Paulose Mar Ivanios (Later Baselios Paulose I)	2nd Metropolitan of the diocese
1913	17-Dec-1928	Geevarghese Mar Philoxenos (Later Baselios Geevarghese I)	3rd Metropolitan of the diocese
17-Dec-1928	1929	Geevarghese Mar Dionysius of Vattasseril (Dionysius VI)	4th Metropolitan of the diocese, Ruled as Malankara Metropolitan
16-Feb-1929	05-Apr-1965	Kuriakose Mar Gregorios	5th Metropolitan of the diocese
1965	31-Aug-1980	Paret Mathews Mar Ivanios	6th Metropolitan of the diocese
31-Aug-1980	Aug-1985	Baselios Marthoma Mathews I Catholicos	7th Metropolitan of the diocese, Ruled as Malankara Metropolitan
Aug-1985	12-Apr-2013	Geevarghese Mar Ivanios	8th Metropolitan of the diocese
12-Apr-2013	12-Jul-2021	Baselios Marthoma Paulose II Catholicos	9th Metropolitan of the diocese, Ruled as Malankara Metropolitan
15-Oct-2021	03-Nov-2022	Baselios Marthoma Mathews III Catholicos	10th Metropolitan of the diocese, Ruled as Malankara Metropolitan
03-Nov-2022	Incumbent	Yuhanon Mar Diascoros	11th Metropolitan of the diocese

Assistant Metropolitan
From	Until	Metropolitan	Notes
1954	1965	Paret Mathews Mar Ivanios	Assistant metropolitan
1975	Unknown	Joseph Mar Pacomios	Assistant metropolitan
1978	12-Oct-1980	Yuhanon Mar Athanasios OIC	Assistant metropolitan
2013	03-Nov-2022	Yuhanon Mar Diascoros	Assistant metropolitan

== Parishes ==
- Amayannoor Kazhunnuvalam Methranchery St.Thomas Orthodox Church
- Amayannoor Karattukunnel St.Marys Orthodox Church
- Areeparambu St.George Orthodox Church
- Anicadu Mar Gregorios Orthodox Church
- Changnasherry St.Thomas Orthodox Church
- Chingavanam St.Johns mission Orthodox Church
- Chenamkary St.Thomas Orthodox Church
- Cheeranchira St.Marys Orthodox Church
- Ettumanoor St.George Orthodox Church
- Kangazha St.Thomas Orthodox Church
- Kangazha Chettedom St.Marys Orthodox Church
- Kannukuzhy St.Marys Orthodox Church
- Kallunkathra Manalel St.George Orthodox Church
- Kanam St.Marys Orthodox Church
- Kanam St.George Orthodox Church
- Kurichy St.Marys and St.Johns Orthodox Church
- Kurichy St.peters and St.pauls Orthodox Church
- Kanam Vetuvelil St.Thomas Orthodox Church
- Kumarakom St.Johns Orthodox Church
- Kuppapuram St.Thomas Orthodox Church
- Kooroppada St.Johns Orthodox Church
- Koottickal St.Marys Orthodox Church
- Kumaramkode Mar Gregorios
- Kolladu St.Pauls Orthodox Church
- Kothala Sehion Orthodox Church
- Meenadom North St.Marys Orthodox Church
- Meenadom Vadakke St.Johns Orthodox Church
- Meenadom Kizhakke St.George Orthodox Church
- Meenadom St.George Orthodox Church
- Meenadom St.Thomas Orthodox Church
- Mundathanam St.Johns Orthodox Church
- Mundakayam St.Thomas Orthodox Church
- Moolavattom St.Marys Orthodox Church
- Njaliyakuzhy Mar Gregorios Orthodox Church
- Nalumnakkal Mar Gregorios Orthodox Church
- Neelimangalam Mar Gregorios Catholicate center (Neelimangalam St.Marys Orthodox Church)
- Nedumavu St.pauls Orthodox Church
- Olassa St.Johns Orthodox Church
- Pariyaram Mar Aprem Orthodox Church
- Pariyaram St.Thomas Orthodox Church
- Pariyaram St.Peters Orthodox Church
- Pallom karamoodu St.Marys Sehion Orthodox Church
- Pallom St.pauls Orthodox Church
- Pampady St.Johns Orthodox Cheriyapali
- Pampady St.Johns Orthodox Cathedral
- Pathamuttom Sleeba Orthodox Church
- Pangada St.Marys Orthodox Church
- Parathode St George Catholicate center (St.George Gracy Memorial Orthodox Church)
- Parampuzha St.George Orthodox Church
- Pachira Thabore St.Marys Orthodox Church
- Pala St.Marys Orthodox Church
- Puthupally St.George Orthodox Valiyapali
- Puthupally Nilackal Orthodox Church
- Pongamthanam St.Thomas Orthodox Church
- Ponkunnam St.Marys Orthodox Church
- South Pampady St.Thomas Orthodox Valiyapali
- Thiruvarppu Marthasmuni Orthodox Church
- Thrikkothamangalam St.James Orthodox Church
- Thengana St.Thomas Orthodox Church
- Thottakadu St.Marys Orthodox Church
- Vadekanmanoor St.Thomas Orthodox Church
- Vakathanam St.Johns Orthodox Valiyapali
- Vakathanam Jerusalem St.Marys Orthodox Church
- Vakathanam St.peters and St.pauls Mission Orthodox Church
- Vakathanam Puthenchantha St.Marys Orthodox Church
- Vakathanam Vettikunel St.George Orthodox Church
- Vakathanam Puthenchantha St.George Orthodox Church
- Vazhoor St.peters Orthodox Church
- Vellukutta St.Thomas Orthodox Church
- Velloor St.Thomas Orthodox Church, Pampady
- Vettikkunnel St.George Orthodox Church, Kottayam
