= Mount Horeb Sasthamcotta =

Monastery in Sasthamkotta, India

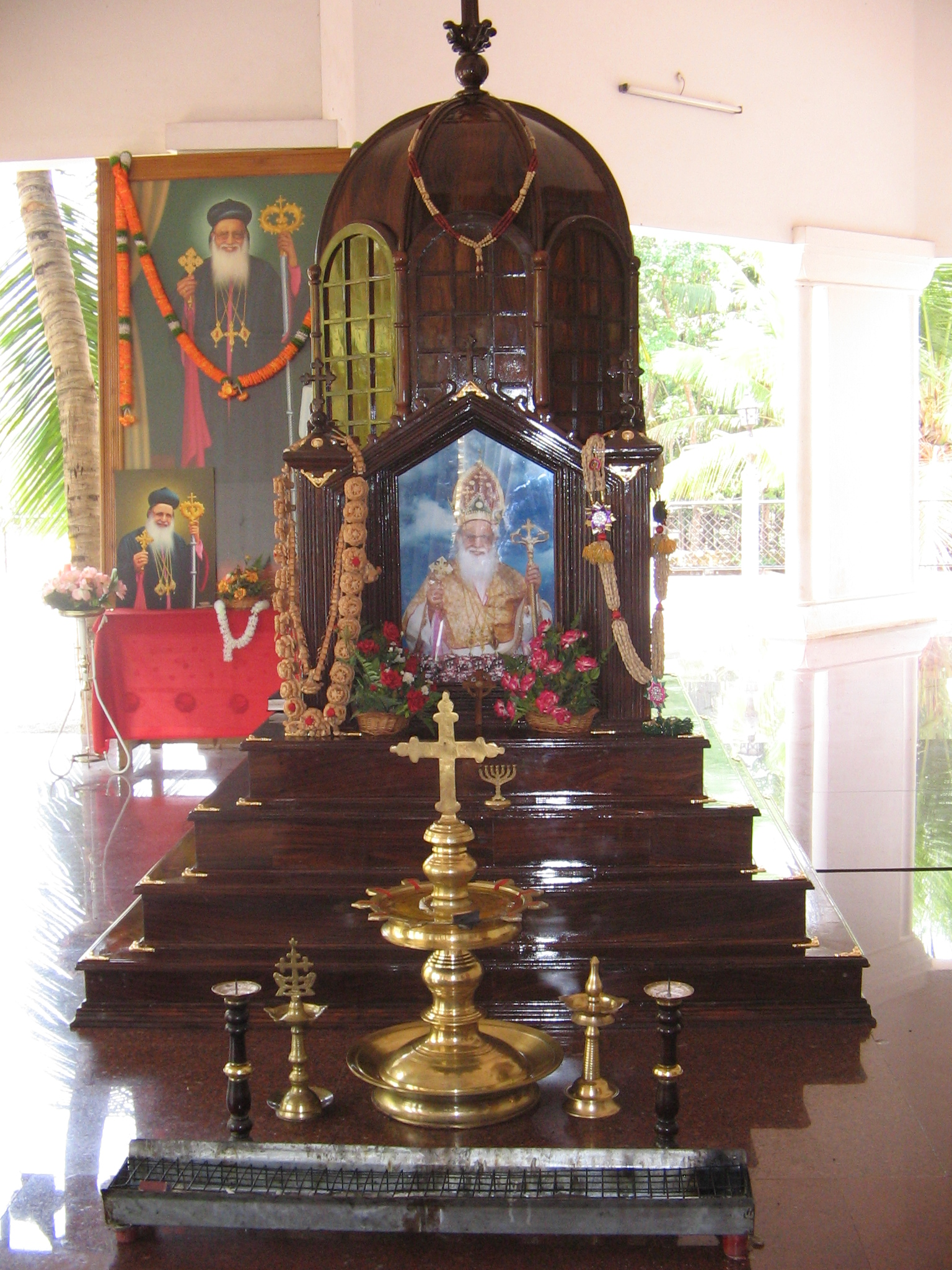
Tomb of H.H Baselios Marthoma Mathews II Malankara Metropolitan & Catholicos of Apostolic throne of Saint Thomas

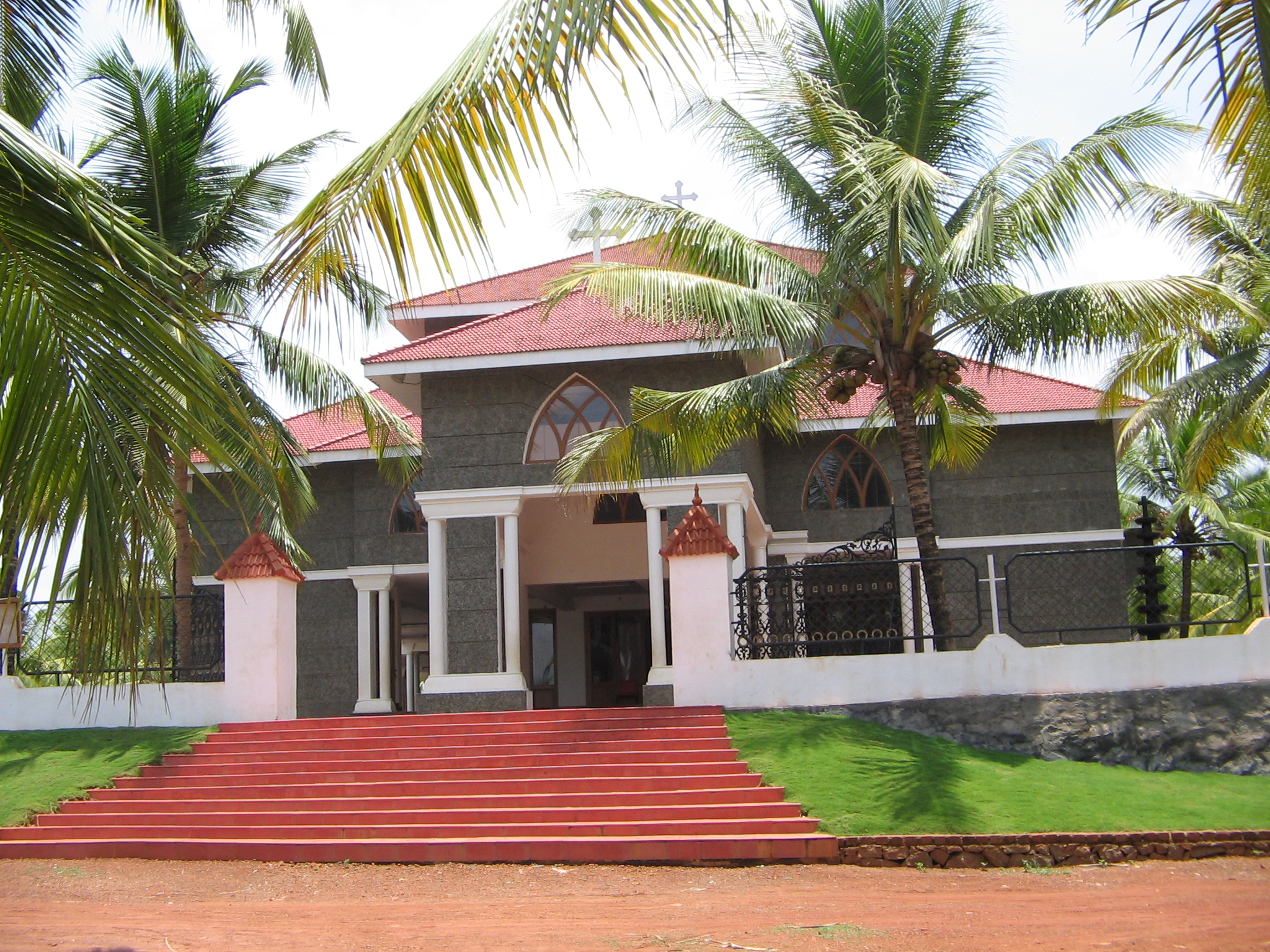
Mount Horeb Chapel, Shasthamkotta

Mount Horeb Ashram is a monastery of the Malankara Orthodox Syrian Church. It is situated in Sasthamkotta near the Sasthamkotta lake. The Ashram was started in 1991.

The tomb of the 19th Malankara Metropolitan and 6th Catholicos of the Malankara Orthodox Syrian Church, Moran Mar Baselios Mar Thoma Mathews II is in this Ashram.
