= Geevarghese Coorilose (Malankara bishop) =

Malankara Orthodox Syrian Church bishop

His Grace Geevarghese Coorilose Metropolitan of Bombay Orthodox Diocese
- Church: Malankara Orthodox Syrian Church
- Diocese: Bombay Diocese
- See: Catholicos of the East
- In office: 1991–present
- Predecessor: Dr. Philipose Mar Theophilos

Orders
- Consecration: 30-Apr-1991 by Catholicos Baselios Marthoma Mathews II
- Rank: Metropolitan

Personal details
- Born: George; 7 October 1949 (age 76) Kollad, Kottayam, Kerala
- Residence: Bombay Orthodox Church Centre, Dr.Mar Theophilus Marg, Sector X-A, Vashi, Juhu Nagar, Navi Mumbai, India - 400 703
- Parents: Mr. P.K Kurian and Mrs. Mary Kurian
- Education: B.A from Calicut University; M.A from Sree Venkateshwara University; B.D from Orthodox Theological Seminary, Kottayam; P.G diploma in Pastoral Theology from Heythrop College, University of London; P.G diploma in Theology and Mission from Urban Theology Unit, Sheffield, England

Geevarghese Mar Coorilose is Metropolitan of Mumbai Diocese of Malankara Orthodox Syrian Church.
