= Geevarghese Yulios =

Indian Malankara Orthodox bishop

Geevarghese Mar Yulios
- Metropolitan of Kunnamkulam
- Church: Malankara Orthodox Syrian Church
- Diocese: Kunnamkulam Orthodox Diocese
- Predecessor: Baselios Marthoma Paulose II
- Other posts: Assistant - Metropolitan of Thiruvananthapuram Diocese; President of National Council of Churches in India; President of Orthodox Christian Youth Movement (OCYM)

Orders
- Ordination: 14 March 1992 (Priest) by Paulose Mar Milithios
- Consecration: 12 May 2010 (Metropolitan) by Baselios Marthoma Didymos I

Personal details
- Born: Geevarghese P. Pavu; 17 May 1967 (age 59) Kunnamkulam, Kerala, India
- Residence: Bishop’s House, Arthat, Kunnamkulam
- Parents: P. V. Pavu and K. V. Anna
- Profession: Professor of Theology, Author
- Education: St. Aloysius College, Elthuruth; Orthodox Theological Seminary, Kottayam; Gurukul Lutheran Theological College; University of Erlangen–Nuremberg (PhD); University of Chicago (Post-doc)

Geevarghese Yulios is the metropolitan bishop of Kunnamkulam Orthodox Diocese. He was born to P V Pavu and K V Anna on May 17, 1967. He is part of the Pulikkottil family from Kunnamkulam. He is the member of St Mathias South Cross Parish.
