= Timotheos Mathews =

Orthodox Bishop

His Grace Mor Timotheos Mathews Karimpanackal Metropolitan Mor Gabriel Monastery veettoor Muvattupuzha
- Former Patriarchal Secretary For Indian Affairs
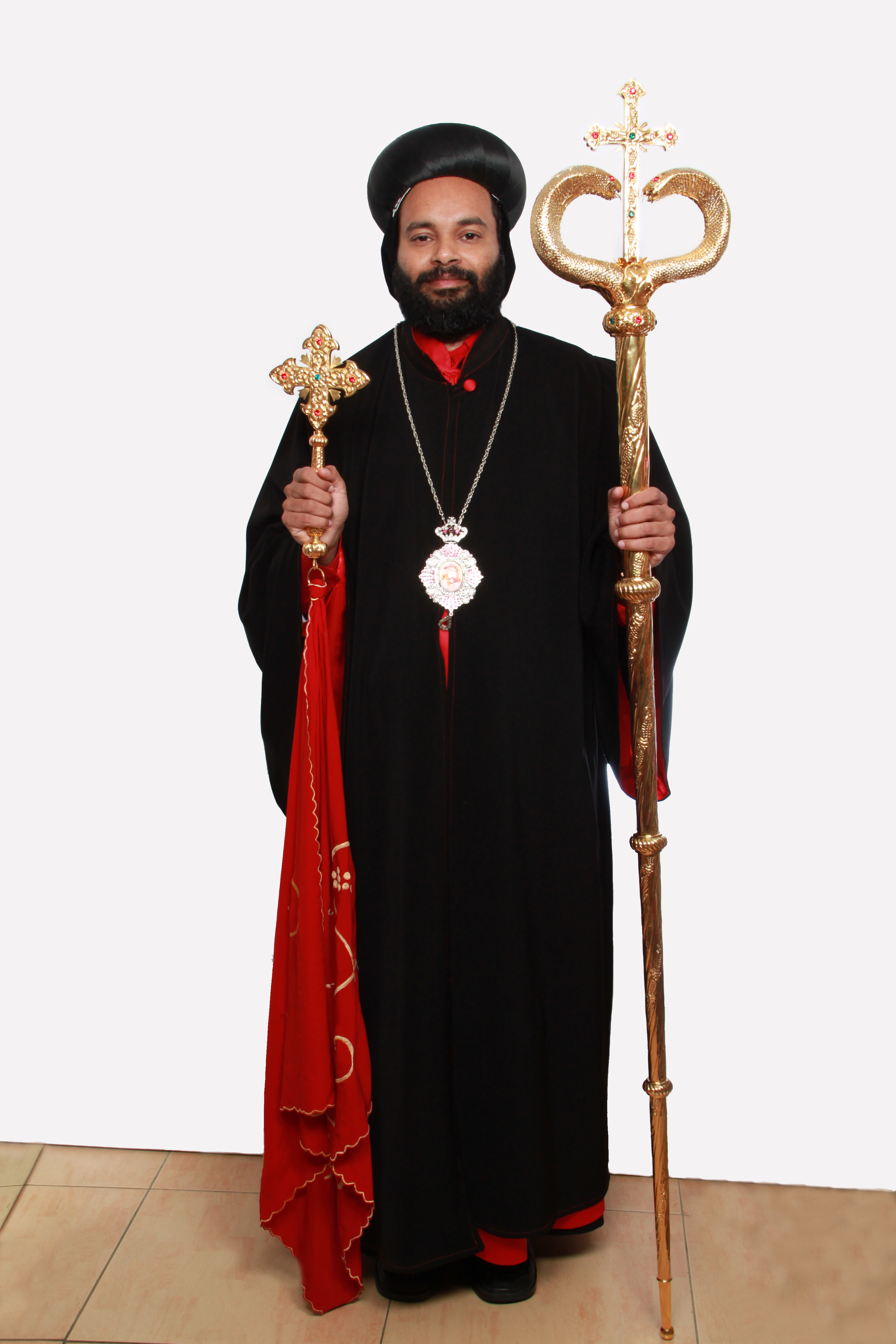
- Native name: Aji Mathew Cheriyan
- Church: Jacobite Syrian Christian Church
- Archdiocese: Mor Gabriel Monastery Veettoor Muvattupuzha
- Metropolis: Spiritual Director of Mor Gabriel Monastery
- Diocese: Jerusalem
- Appointed: 10 December 2010

Orders
- Consecration: 15 November 2012 by Ignatius Zakka I
- Rank: Metropolitan

Personal details
- Born: Aji Mathew Cheriyan; 8 October 1972 (age 53) Cheppad, Kerala, India
- Denomination: Christian, Syrian Orthodox
- Residence: Mor Gabriel Monastery Veettoor Muvattupuzha Kerala, India
- Parents: Late Mr. Cheriyan Abraham & Late Mrs. Mary M Mathew
- Education: M. Th

Mor Timotheos Mathews (born 8 October 1972) is a Syriac Orthodox bishop, he was Metropolitan Patriarchal Secretary For Indian Affairs.

== See also ==
- Jacobite Syrian Christian Church
- Oriental Orthodox Church
- Saint Thomas Christians
