= Bombay Orthodox Diocese =

Church in Navi Mumbai, India

Diocese of Bombay

Orthodox
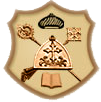
- Catholicate Emblem

Location
- Country: India
- Territory: Bombay
- Metropolitan: H. G. Geevarghese Mar Coorilose; Geevarghese Mar Theophilos(Asst.)
- Headquarters: Orthodox Church Centre, Dr. Mar Theophilius marg, Sector 10- A, Vashi, Juhu Nagar, New Mumbai- 400 703

Information
- First holder: Thomas Mar Makarios
- Rite: Malankara Rite
- Established: 1976
- Diocese: Bombay Diocese
- Parent church: Malankara Orthodox Syrian Church

Website
- Bombay Diocese

Bombay Diocese is one of the 32 diocese of the Indian Orthodox Church located at The Orthodox Church Centre, Vashi, Navi Mumbai.

== History ==
The parishes in Mumbai Region were part of the Outside Kerala Diocese until the Bombay Diocese was formed in 1976. The first parish in Mumbai was St. Mary's Orthodox Syrian Cathedral in Dadar, which was consecrated in 1951 by the late Catholicos Baselios Geevarghese II. The present Diocese of Mumbai was formed in 1976, with Thomas Mar Makarios as its first bishop.

The Diocese established the first Gregorian Community in Roha near Mumbai, with the motto "worship, study, and service". Named after the saint Mary, the community aimed to create a space for young people to meet and experience the richness of nature, to induct them into the monastic life and worship patterns, and to instill a sense of commitment and service to the community.

== Diocesan Metropolitan ==
List of Diocesan Metropolitan
From	Until	Metropolitan	Notes
1976	1979	Dr. Thomas Mar Makarios	Transferred to newly formed American Diocese. Died in February 2008.
1979	1997	Dr. Philipose Mar Theophilos	Entombed at Thrikkunnath Seminary, Aluva
2006	Present	Geevarghese Mar Coorilos	

== Parishes ==
- Ahmednagar St. Marys Orthodox Church
- Ambernath St. Gregorios Orthodox Church
- Andheri St. Johns Orthodox Church
- Aurangabad St. Marys Orthodox Church
- Airoli St. Gregorios Orthodox Church
- Baharin St. Marys Orthodox Cathedral
- Belgaum St. Gregorios Orthodox Church
- Borivali St. George Orthodox Church
- Bhosari St. Gregorios Orthodox Church
- C.B.D St. Marys Orthodox Church
- Chembur Mar Gregorios Orthodox Church
- Chinchwad St. George Orthodox Church
- Colaba St. Peters Orthodox Church
- Dadar St. Marys Orthodox Cathedral
- Dandeli St. Marys Orthodox Church
- Dehu Road St. Gregorios Orthodox Church
- Devalali St. Marys Orthodox Church
- Dighi St. Gregorios Orthodox
- Doha St. Marys Orthodox Church
- Dhulia St. Gregorios Orthodox Church
- Dombivli St. Marys Orthodox Church
- Hubli St. Marys Orthodox Church
- Kalamboli St. George Orthodox Church
- Kalina St. Baselios Orthodox Church
- Kalyan St. Thomas Orthodox Church
- Kalyan East St. George Orthodox Church
- Karad St. Marys Orthodox Church
- Kirkee St. Thomas Orthodox Church
- Khopoli St. Gregorios Orthodox Church
- Bhusaval St. Gregorios Orthodox Church
- Lonawala St. Gregorios Orthodox Church
- Malad St.Thomas Orthodox Church
- Mira-Bhayandher St. Gregorios Orthodox Church
- Mulund St. George Orthodox Church
- Nashik St. George Orthodox Church
- Nerul St. Marys Orthodox Church
- Nallasoppara St. Gregorios Orthodox Church
- Panavel St. Gregorios Orthodox Church
- Pimpri-Kalewadi St. Marys Orthodox Church
- Pen St. Thomas Orthodox Church
- Powai St. Pauls Orthodox Church
- Pune St. Mary's Orthodox Syrian Church
- Rasayani St. Marys Orthodox Church
- Roha St. Peters and St.Pauls Orthodox Church
- Sakinaka St. George Orthodox Church
- Silvassa St. Gregorios Orthodox Church
- Surat St. Beselios Orthodox Church
- Tarapur St. Gregorios Orthodox Church
- Thane St. Stephens Orthodox Church
- Ulhas Nagar St.Marys Orthodox Church
- Valsad St. Gregorios Orthodox Church
- Vapi St. Marys Orthodox Church
- Vasai Road St. Thomas Orthodox Church
- Vashi St. Thomas Orthodox Church
