= Catholicate Aramana Chapel =

Church in Kerala, India

Coordinates: 9°34′37″N 76°32′34″E

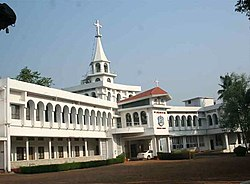

The Catholicate Aramana Chapel in Kottayam, Kerala, India, is the personal chapel of the Catholicos, located at the Catholicate Aramana which is the headquarters of the Malankara Orthodox Syrian Church and residence of the Catholicos of the East and Malankara Metropolitan.

Many previous catholicoi including Paulose II (Indian Orthodox Church) are entombed there.

== Leaders interred ==
1. Baselios Geevarghese II
2. Baselios Augen I
3. Baselios Marthoma Mathews I
4. Baselios Marthoma Paulose II

== Relics ==
Relics of St. Thomas
