= Geevarghese Theophilos =

Orthodox bishop

Geevarghese Mar Theophilos
- Church: Malankara Orthodox Syrian Church
- Diocese: Ahemedabad Orthodox Diocese
- In office: 2022 – Present

Orders
- Ordination: 28 July 2022 by H. H. Moran Mar Baselios Marthoma Mathews III

Personal details
- Born: 8 August 1971 (age 53)

Geevarghese Mar Theophilos is a Metropolitan of the Malankara Orthodox Syrian Church.

== Early life ==
H. G. Geevarghese Mar Theophilos was born on 8 August 1971.

== Metropolitan ==
He was elected as the Metropolitan candidate on 25 February 2022 at the Malankara Association held at Kolenchery. He was consecrated as Metropolitan on 28 July 2022 at St. Mary's Orthodox Cathedral, Pazhanji.
