= Baselios Marthoma Paulose II =

Head of the Malankara Church (1946–2021)

His Holiness Baselios Marthoma Paulose II
- Catholicos of the East & Malankara Metropolitan
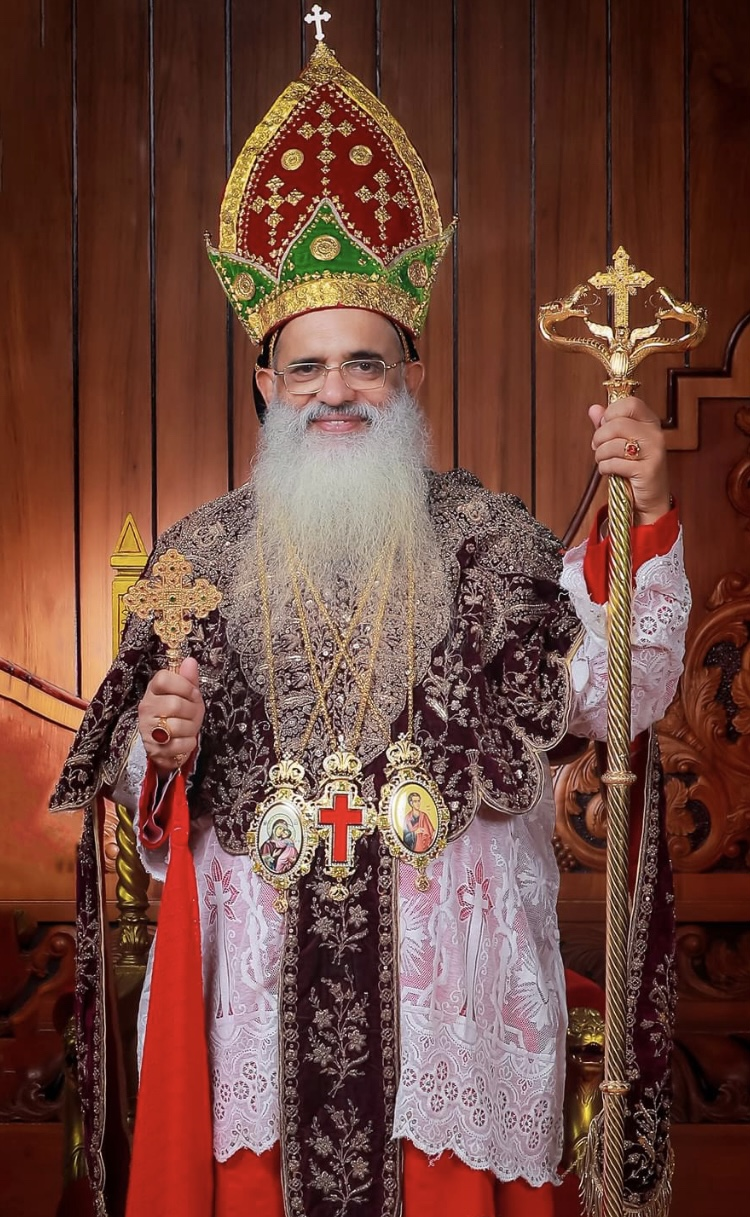
- Church: Malankara Orthodox Syrian Church
- See: The Holy Apostolic Throne of St Thomas
- Elected: 12 October 2006
- Installed: 1 November 2010
- Term ended: 12 July 2021
- Predecessor: Baselios Marthoma Didymos I
- Successor: Baselios Marthoma Mathews III
- Previous posts: Metropolitan of Kunnamkulam Diocese (1985-2021); Catholicose Designate and Assistant to Malankara Metropolitan (2006-2010)

Orders
- Ordination: 1973 by Yuhanon Mar Severios
- Consecration: 15 May 1985 by Mathews I
- Rank: Catholicos

Personal details
- Born: Kollanoor Iype Paul; 30 August 1946 Kunnamkulam
- Died: 12 July 2021 (aged 74) Kerala, India
- Buried: Catholicate Aramana Chapel
- Education: St. Thomas College (BS); Orthodox Theological Seminary (GST); Serampore University (BD); C.M.S College (MA)

Baselios Marthoma Paulose II (born K. I. Paul of Kollanoor House in West Mangad; 30 August 1946 – 12 July 2021) was the primate of the Malankara Orthodox Syrian Church. He was ordained in 1973, consecrated in 1985 and enthroned as the 8th Catholicos of the Malankara Church and the 21st Malankara Metropolitan on 1 November 2010, succeeding Didymos I.

== Early years ==
Kollanoor Iype Paul was born on 30 August 1946 as the second son of Kollannur. I. Iype of Kollanoor house, West Mangad near Pazhanji in Thrissur district of Kerala, India. His mother Kunjeetty belonged to the Pulikkottil family. He was given the name Paul after his grandfather. He was baptized in Pazhanji. He completed his preliminary education at the Mangad Church School until his 7th standard. He completed his high school studies at the Pazhanji Government High School, which was established by the late Pulikkottil Joseph Mar Dionysius II.

As a child, Paul attended church services regularly and became an altar boy at a young age. At 13, he was selected by his parish priest to be a part of the Order of the Washing of the Feet which is done on Maundy Thursday by H.G Paulose Mar Severios. In 1963, he completed his SSLC.

== Education ==
Paul studied for pre-university and obtained a Bachelor of Science degree in physics from St. Thomas College, Thrissur. During this time, he was an active member of the MGOCSM at his church. His spiritual calling was strengthened while studying for his degree.

In 1969, Paul enrolled at the Orthodox Theological Seminary in Kottayam for his theological studies under the discipleship of Paulos Gregorios, T J Abraham Malpan, and N.K Koruthu Malpan. He received his GST degree from Orthodox Theological Seminary and bachelor's degree from Serampore University. After that, he received a Master of Arts degree in sociology from C.M.S. College, Kottayam.

== Priesthood ==
On 8 April 1972, Paul was ordained for the first stage of diaconate in Parumala Seminary. He was ordained a full deacon as Dn. K.I. Paul at Koratty Zion Seminary. On 2 June 1973, Dn. Paul was ordained a priest as K.I. Paul. by Yuhanon Mar Severios in Parumala Seminary. Paul celebrated the first Holy Qurbana at Mangad St. Gregorios Church, and served as vicar in the Mooleppat Mar Baselios Mar Gregorios Church for a short while. On 14 May 1983, Paul was ordained as a Ramban at Parumala Seminary by Mathews Mar Kuriolose(Mathews II).

== Episcopate ==
On 15 May 1985, at the age of 38, K I Paulose Ramban was ordained as a bishop and was given the name "Paulose Mar Milithios" at Puthiyakavu St. Mary's Church by Mathews I. He was the first Metropolitan after Geevarghese Mar Gregorios and Puthenkavil Geevarghese Mar Philexinos to be ordained to the bishopric below the age of 40. Four other bishops, Mathews Epiphanios, Philipose Eusebius, Geevarghese Ivanios and Thomas Athanasius were also ordained with "Paulose Milithios".

A new diocese for the Church, named to be Kunnamkulam was formed on 14 April 1985 by dividing a small part of the Kochi diocese and churches nearby to form the diocese. The newly ordained Paulose Milithios was appointed the diocesan metropolitan of the newly formed diocese. The diocesan center and diocesan chapel are part of his contributions.

== Enthronement as Catholicos of East and Malankara Metropolitan ==
The Holy Episcopal synod and the Managing committee nominated him as the successor to the Catholicos of the East on 27 September 2006. Paulose Mar Milithios was enthroned as the new Catholicos of the East and Malankara Metropolitan at a ceremony at the St. Paul's and St. Peter's church at Parumala on 1 November 2010, succeeding Baselius Marthoma Didymus I, who abdicated at the age of 90. Thomas Mar Athanasius was the chief celebrant for the Holy Qurbana of the ceremony. He is 21st Malankara Metropolitan and 8th Catholicos of the Malankara Church. The enthronement came almost a year before the Church officially launched the centenary celebrations of the 1912 establishment of the Catholicate in Malankara Church and 1960th year of establishment of Malankara Orthodox Syrian Church. At the inception of Catholicate the first Catholicos was named as Paulose I. Now at the centenary of the Catholicate the Catholicos is again being called Paulose, precisely Paulose II. "This is not a coincidence, but a great plan of God" said the Principal of Orthodox Theological Seminary, K.M. George.

=== Visits and meetings ===
He was created Associate Companion of the Roll of Honour of the Memorial of Merit of King Charles the Martyr in 2012. With the British Orthodox Church

In 2013, during his Apostolic European maiden voyage, celebrated Holy Qurbana, 80 years since the first celebration of the Malankara Orthodox Syrian Qurbana in the Chapel of King's College, London; 75 years since Mar Baselios Geeverghese II's visit in 1937. In 2013, he met with Pope Francis, the head of the Roman Catholic church, to congratulate him on his new papacy. Pope Francis thanked the Malankara Church and Catholicos saying:

The Apostle Thomas exclaimed, "My Lord and my God!" (Jn 2:28) with one of the most beautiful confessions of faith in Christ handed down by the Gospels, a faith which proclaims the divinity of Christ, his lordship in our lives, and his victory over sin and death through his resurrection. This event is so real that Saint Thomas is invited to touch for himself the actual marks of the crucified and risen Jesus (cf. Jn 20:27). It is precisely in this faith that we meet each other; it is this faith that unites us, even if we cannot yet share the Eucharistic table; and it is this faith which urges us to continue and intensify the commitment to ecumenism, encounter and dialogue towards full communion. With deep affection I welcome Your Holiness and the members of your delegation and I ask you to convey my cordial greetings to the Bishops, clergy and faithful of the Malankara Orthodox Syrian Church.

With Tikhon, Metropolitan of OCA

In 2015, the Malanakara Orthodox Church invited the Archbishop of Washington, Metropolitan of All America and Canada, Tikhon Mollard to speak at the bicentenary valedictory celebrations of the Orthodox Theological Seminary in Kottayam, Kerala, India. In that same year, Tikhon and Paulose II met in Armenia for the 100th Anniversary of the Armenian Genocide.

With Archbishop Michael In 2017, the Catholicos met Michael Dahulich, Archbishop of New York and the diocese of New York and New Jersey. While in Kerala, Michael visited various churches, and seminaries. One of Michael's highlights of his visit to Kerala was visiting and venerating the relics of Thomas the Apostle.

With Patriarch Kirill of Moscow

In 2019, the Catholicos met with the head of the Russian Orthodox Church, Patriarch Kirill of Moscow to discuss forming a working committee.

During the meeting between the two Church heads, an agreement was also reached to promote the study of iconography and liturgical music. Activities of youth organizations will be integrated and social activities are to be promoted, said the spokesperson. "It has also been decided to improve cooperation in academic and media fields", he said.

— Express News Service, Fr. Johns Abraham Konat, The New Indian Express

Fraternal visits

2012 - In 2012, Paulose II, was invited to the enthronement service of the supreme head of the Coptic Orthodox Church, Pope Tawadros II in St. Mark's Cathedral, Cairo. Paulose II was present for the Holy Eucharist and offered his prayers and best wishes to the Pope.

2013 - In 2013, Paulose II was invited to the enthronement service of the patriarch catholicos of Ethiopia, Abune Mathais. During a keynote meeting, Paulose II spoke on the importance of the cooperation between the Ethiopian and Indian Orthodox churches in theological education, and pastoral work.

2015 - In 2015, Paulose II was invited by catholicos Aram I of the Armenian Orthodox Church to participate in the 100th anniversary of the Armenian Genocide. Earlier in 2010, Aram I was given the honorary award, Order of Saint Thomas.

2017 - In 2017, Paulose II was invited by the Syrian Orthodox primate Moran Mor Ignatius Aphrem II, who was visiting India, to a peace talk. The Malankara Church declined the offer and requested that the Patriarch should initiate the process for the implementation of the Supreme Court's verdicts first.

=== Consecration of Holy Chrism ===
Paulose II consecrated the Holy Chrism (the anointing oil known as Myron/Mooron) on 23 March 2018 at Catholicate Aramana Chapel, Kottayam.

== Health ==
He was "under treatment for lung cancer since December, 2019."

In early 2020, it was announced that Paulose II was experiencing some minor sickness and undergoing treatments at Saint Gregorios Hospital in Parumala, Kerala, India. On 23 February 2021, it was confirmed that Paulose II has contracted COVID-19 and undergoing treatments at the Saint Gregorios Hospital in Parumala, Kerala, India.

== Death ==
On 12 July 2021, it was announced that Paulose II passed away in the Saint Gregorios International Cancer Care Center in Parumala, Kerala, India. He was laid to rest with state honours in a specially-made crypt beside the Catholicate Aramana Chapel at the Church headquarters at Devalokam near Kottayam. A five-member Episcopal Council led by senior metropolitan Kuriakose Mar Cleemis managed the administration of the church until 14 October 2021. The Malankara Association, an apex body comprising priests and laity representatives from all parishes under the church, designated the then Dr. Mathews Mor Severios Metropolitan as head of the church.

== Official title ==
- K. I. Paul (1946–1972)
- Deacon K. I. Paul (1972–1973)
- Rev. Fr. K. I. Paul (1973–1983)
- Very Rev. Paulose Ramban (1983–1985)
- His Grace Paulose Mar Milithios Metropolitan (1985–2006)
- His Beatitude Paulose Mar Milithios, Assistant to Malankara Metropolitan and Successor-designate to the Catholicos of the East (2006–2010)
- His Holiness Moran Mar Baselios Marthoma Paulose II, Catholicos of the East and Malankara Metropolitan enthroned on the Apostolic Throne of Saint Thomas (2010 – 2021)

Oriental Orthodox titles
| Preceded by Baselios Marthoma Didymos I 2005–2010 | Catholicos of the East & Malankara Metropolitan; 2010–2021 | Succeeded by Baselios Marthoma Mathews III; 2021–present |
