= Thrikkunnathu Seminary =

Building in India

Coordinates: 10.1026152°N 76.3574106°E

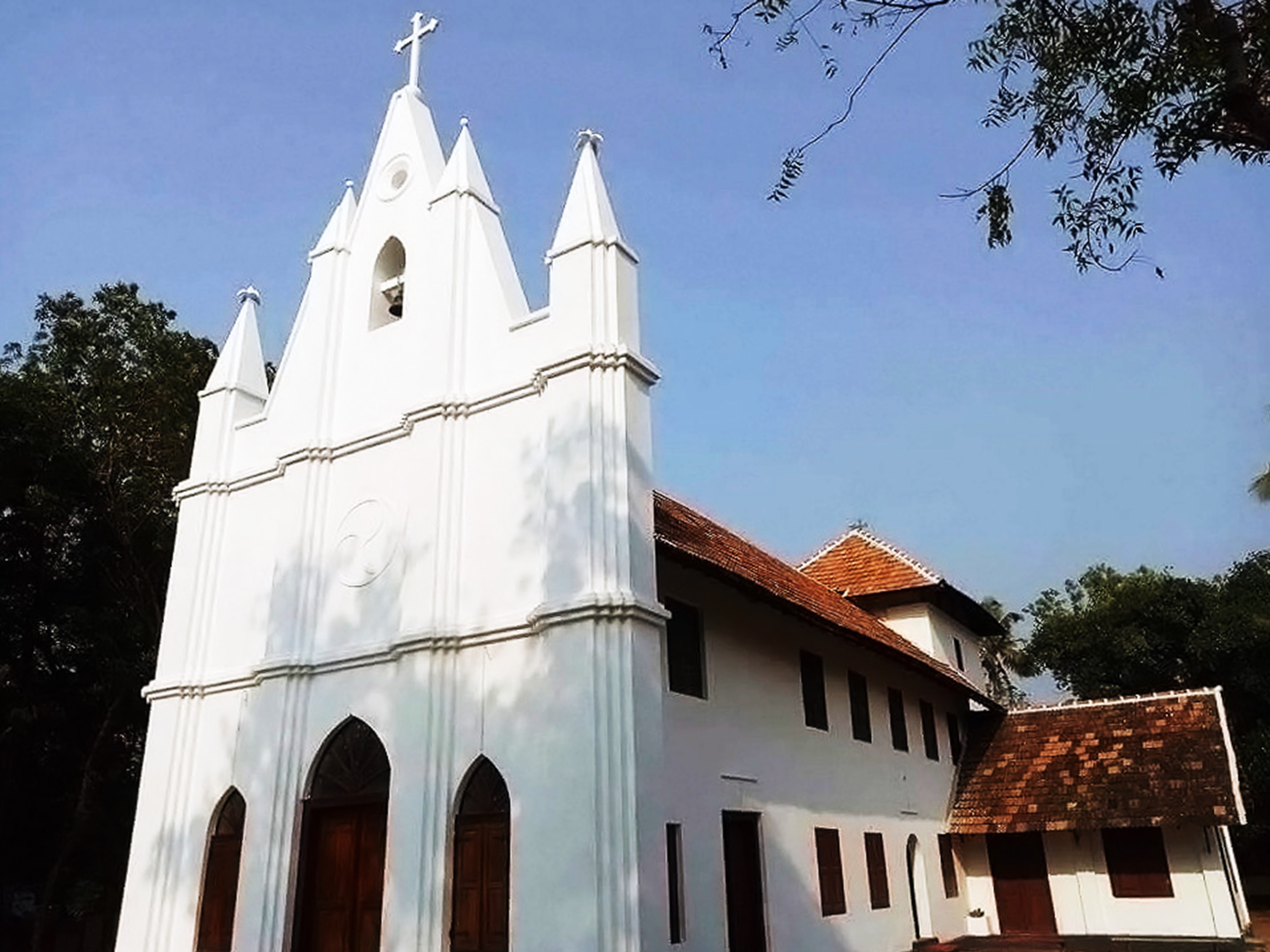
St Mary's Malankara Orthodox Syrian Church at Thrikkunnathu Seminary in Aluva, 2018.

Thrikkunathu Seminary is a historic seminary under the ownership of Malankara Orthodox Syrian Church in Aluva, Ernakulam.Owing to an ownership dispute between the factions, the Methran Kakshi and the Bava Kashi, the seminary was closed in December 1977. The church is a pilgrimage site for Christians in India. It is the headquarters of Angamaly diocese of Malankara Orthodox Syrian Church.

== St Mary's Church ==
In 1880 the Malankara Church acquired 18 acres (73,000 m^{2}) of land for construction of the church and a cornerstone was laid in 1889. The church began as a small building thatched with coconut leaves which was slowly built out in the early 1900s. Kuttikkattil Paulose Mar Athanasios in the early 1930s built the present St Mary's Church. Mar Athanasius both gave away and sold at a very low price much of his inherited land so that Syrian Christians settling in the area could live near the church. The western side of the building was enlarged in 1964. Inside are the tombs of four 19th and 20th century Angamaly diocesan metropolitans, Kadavil Paulose Mar Athanasius (d 1907), Kuttikkattil Paulose Mar Athanasios (d 1953) Vayalipparambil Geevarghese Mar Gregorios (d 1966) and Philippose Mar Theophilos.

On 25 and 26 January each year thousands of pilgrims gather at the seminary to take part in the celebrations commemorating the feast (Dhukrono- Death Anniversary) of the metropolitans.

== Seminary ==
A cornerstone for the seminary was laid down in 1904. An English middle school was also planned but never built. Like the newer church building, the seminary was finished and opened by Kuttikkattil Paulose Mar Athanasius in 1930–31. A dormitory for seminary students called the Syrian Hostel was also built nearby. In the spring of 1931 Syriac Orthodox Patriarch Ignatius Elias III began a long journey of mediation throughout India by staying at the new seminary, after first calling on British officials Lord Irwin in Delhi and George Stanley at Madras.

A second floor was added in 1956. From its opening in 1931 until the 1970s Thrikkunnathu Seminary was a notable teaching facility for clergy in the northern dioceses of the Malankara Orthodox Syrian Church.

== Closing and later history ==
When the Malankara Syrian Church split in 1975 the seminary's resident metropolitan bishop had been Angamali diocesan head of the official Orthodox church body since the late 1960s. The seminary building, church and grounds ownership was retained by Malankara Orthodox Church. Ownership was disputed in the aftermath and two years later, on 6 December 1977 the seminary and church were closed. Malankara Orthodox metropolitans still reside in the seminary building.

In 1997 Philipose Mar Theophilos, then metropolitan of Angamali diocese of the Malankara Orthodox Syrian Church, died while staying at the old seminary building and was entombed next to the church. This tomb was later rebuilt as another room of the church building itself.

Since the early 1980s the Patriarch faction started to worship in a rented building called Mass Hall not far from St Mary's Church.

Mediation efforts to settle disagreements over the use of the seminary have been unsuccessful. On 3 July 2005, local police were called to the closed church when violence broke out over the long-standing ownership dispute. A government lawyer's automobile was set on fire, priests and others were reportedly hurt and there were claims of police brutality. In January 2009 the church had been closed for over 31 years when The New Indian Express, after speaking with a spokesman for the Malankara Orthodox church, reported that "the Catholicos faction was not averse to letting the faithful of both factions worship in the Church, but the top Church officials of the Patriarch faction cannot be allowed in."

In January 2006, the Hindu reported that "A meeting of various groups under the Orthodox Church on Sunday at the seminary said that they would protect the seminary property at any cost and warned that the Government would be responsible for the fall out of anyone using force to enter the seminary premises."

== See also ==
- Syrian Malabar Nasrani
- Syrian church in India
