= Jalahalli =

- Suburb
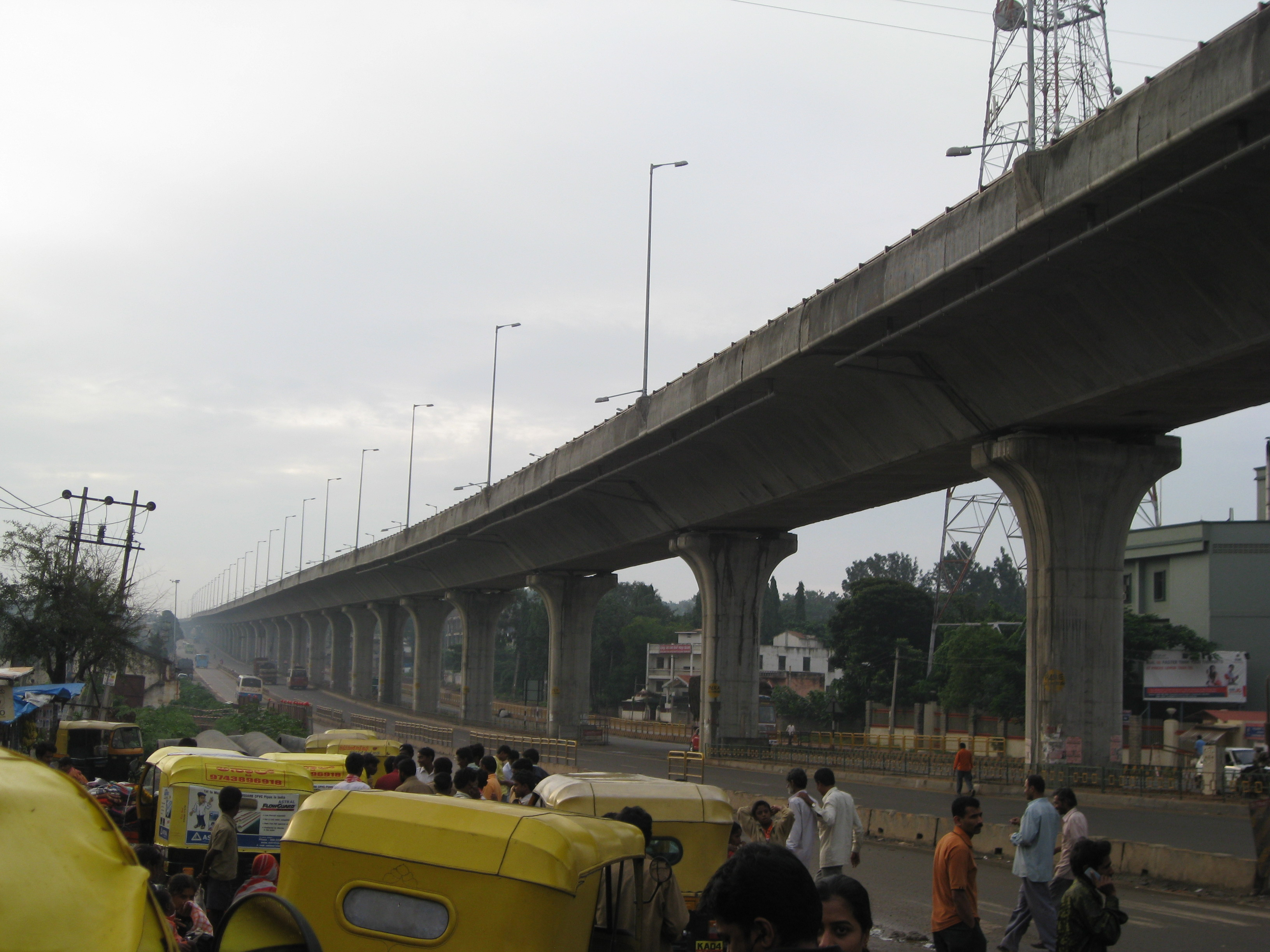
- A view of the NBTPL project from Jalahalli cross on Bengaluru-Tumakuru Road [9]

- Location within Bengaluru
- Coordinates: 13.0519°N 77.5416°E
- Country: India
- State: Karnataka
- Metro: Bengaluru

Government
  - Type: Municipal Corporation
  - Body: Bruhat Bengaluru Mahanagara Palike

Population (2020)
  - Suburb: 50,000
  - Density: 6,771/km^{2} (17,540/sq mi)
  - Metro: 300,000

Languages
  - Official: Kannada,
- Time zone: UTC+5:30 (IST)
- PIN code: 560013,560014,560015

Jalahalli a suburb in northern part of Bengaluru is one of the greenest areas of Bengaluru. It is mainly divided into Jalahalli East and Jalahalli West. Gangamma Circle is the junction between the roads connecting Jalahalli East, Jalahalli West, Jalahalli Village, and Jalahalli Cross. The National Academy of Customs and Narcotics in Bengaluru is located here.

Jalahalli East has land on Jakarbandi State Forest. It houses major industrial companies like Bharat Electronics Limited (BEL), Hindustan Machine Tools (HMT), CMTI and other PSUs. This area also houses various private industries, including the packaging unit of Tata Tea Ltd, and other small-scale industries. The Air Force Station, Jalahalli East is located between Gangamma circle and MS Palya. MS Palya is also connected to Vidyaranyapura while Jalahalli West Airforce station is near Jalahalli Cross and the Jalahalli metro station.

Jalahalli West, Kuvempu Nagar, has coconut grove and eucalyptus plantations. It includes the Indian Air Force Training Command, Ayyappan Temple and surrounding areas like Shettihalli, etc. This place is connected to the NH48 (Tumakuru highway) at Jalahalli Cross, and Jalahalli East at Gangamma Circle. The other landmarks in Jalahalli include BEL Market, Gangamma Circle, Jalahalli Village and Jalahalli Cross.

The neighbouring areas of Jalahalli include Gangamma Circle, Kuvempu Nagar, Kamagondanahalli, Siddhartha Nagar, Peenya, Abbigere Ramachandrapura, Hebbal, Vidyaranyapura, Dasarahalli, Mathikere, and Yeswanthpur.

== Current settlements ==
Jalahalli Village is surrounded by large government organizations that started shortly after independence.

== Developments ==
Jalahalli area is dotted with small scale industries all over. Its proximity to Peenya industrial area has influenced the kind of work force availability.

The Bangalore International Airport [BIAL], located at Devanahalli, has added to the floating population.

The opening of Ring road has led to some more developments. There are hotels like Movenpick Hotel, ATMs, schools, and other basic amenities.

== Educational institutions ==
=== Colleges ===
- BEL College
- M.N.Degree College
- St Paul college, Nagasandra
- St. Claret College

==== Schools ====
- Ashoka School and Polytechnic, KG Halli
- AES high school, KG Halli.
- BEL Primary School
- BEL CBSE School
- Cluny Convent School
- Jalahalli Public School
- Kendriya Vidyalaya No.1 Jalahalli
- Kendriya Vidyalaya No.2 Jalahalli
- St. Claret School
- St. Stephen School, KG Halli
- SDA English School, KG Halli
- Sharon English School
- Sri Vidya Public School, KG Halli.

===== Other =====
- Air Force Technical College, Bengaluru
- MN Poly Technic, KG Halli

== People ==
R. Ashok BJP Leader and former Dy. Chief Minister of Karnataka

Pratheek C R&D Engineer, Tejas Networks Private Limited.

S. Ramesh, Congress leader, former Karnataka Minister and past president of the Karnataka Film Chamber

== Places of Worship ==
- Sri Gangamma Devi Temple, Gangamma Circle, Jalahalli
- Sri Mathamma Temple (Siddhartha Nagar)
- Muthayalamma Temple
- Sharadamba Temple
- Shani Mahatma temple.
- Ebenezer Marthoma Church
- BEL Ganesha Temple
- Jalahalli Sree Ayyappan Temple
- Sarva Murthy Temple
- St. Thomas Church
- St. Stephen's Church
- Our Lady of Fatima Church
- St. Mary's Orthodox Church (Now St. Mary's Orthodox Valiyapally)
- Raghavendra Mutt
- Anjaneya Temple
- CSI Krupalya Church, KG Halli
- Sharon Baptist Church, KG HAlli
- SDA Church, KG Halli
- St. Marys Cross Station, KG Halli
- St. Antony Chapel, Siddhartnagar
- Sri Rama Temple, KG Halli.
- Holy Bible Church, Kuvempu Nagar.
- Sri Muthumariyamma Temple, (KG Halli).
- Sri Radha Gopinath Bhavan, Peenya

== Transport ==
The area is connected by Bangalore Metropolitan Transport Corporation. Following are the buses connecting the area with major areas/bus terminus of the city.

BMTC Bus with number:

- 271D, 271J connects Jalahalli with Kempegowda Bus Station/Majestic.
- 271J connects Jalahalli with K R Market.
- 270C connects Jalahalli with Shivajinagar.
- 273C connects Majestic with Jalahalli Cross.
- 258 series buses connect Majestic and Nelamangala town in Bangalore Rural district. This route has a stop at Jallahali.

== In Movies and Books ==
The 1979 Kannada film "Arivu" (Awareness) directed by Katte Ramachandra was shot in Jalahalli (BEL Colony and BEL School) in the late 70s.

The Killer of Jalahalli (a leopard) is one of the stories in the book called Nine Maneaters and One Rogue by written by Kenneth Anderson.
