= St. Mary's Orthodox Cathedral, Pazhanji =

Oriental Orthodox Cathedral in Kerala

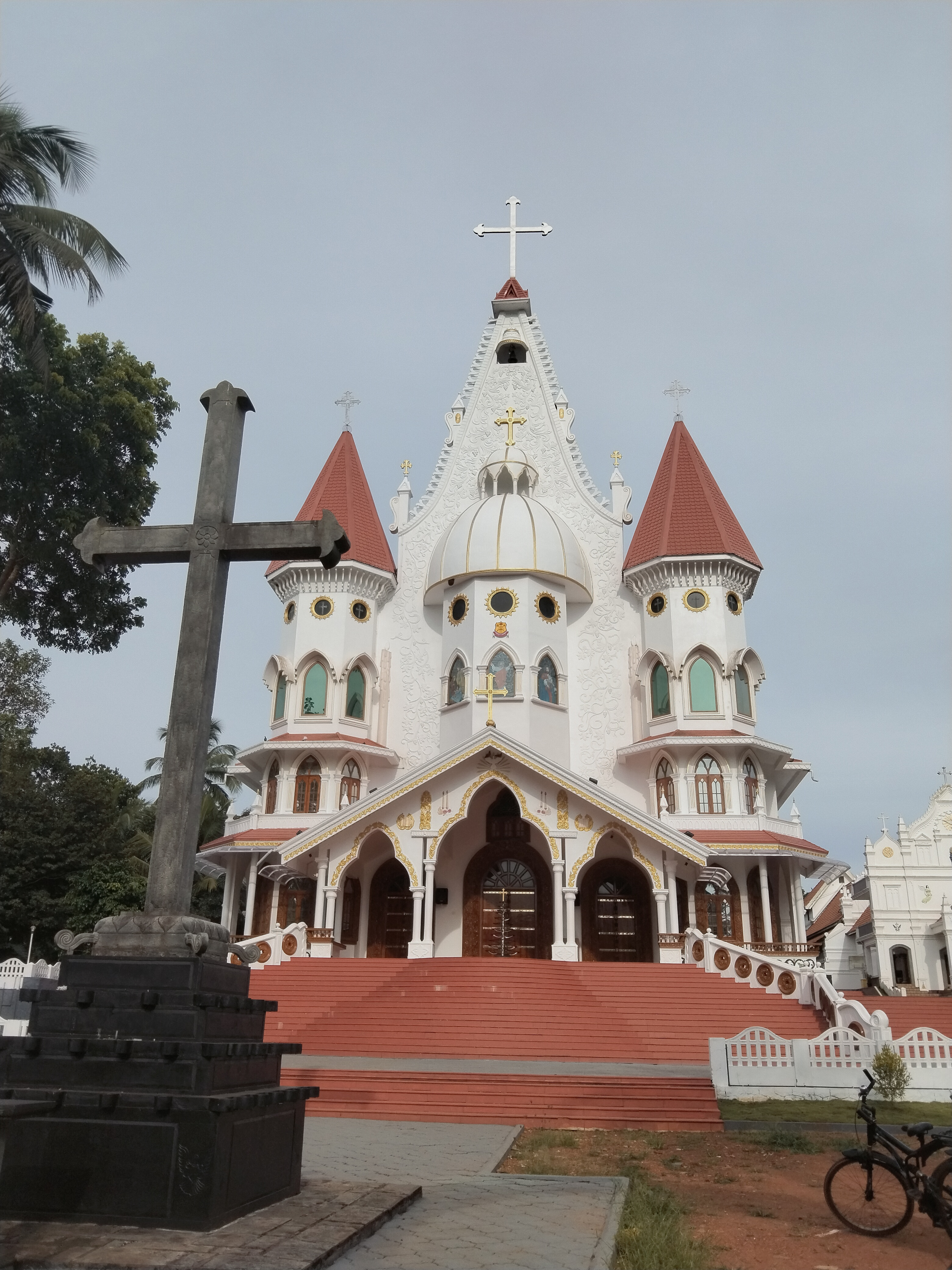
- New church building in 2022

Religion
- Affiliation: Malankara Orthodox Syrian Church
- District: Thrissur
- Province: Kerala
- Ecclesiastical or organisational status: Cathedral

Location
- Location: Pazhanji, Kunnamkulam, India

Architecture
- Type: Church
- Style: Kerala Architecture

Website
- https://www.pazhanjicathedral.com/

Pazhanji Church, officially known as St. Mary's Orthodox Cathedral, Pazhanji or Pazhanji Cathedral, is a Malankara Orthodox Syrian Church situated at Pazhanji near Kunnamkulam in Thrissur District of Kerala, India. The Church is locally called " Pazhanji Palli " (In Malayalam : പഴഞ്ഞി പള്ളി ) "Palli" [similar to the Malayalam word for "Church"].

Four frescoes which had long been hidden by whitewash, believed to be 250 years old, were discovered in 2018. They were being restored in 2018.

== History ==
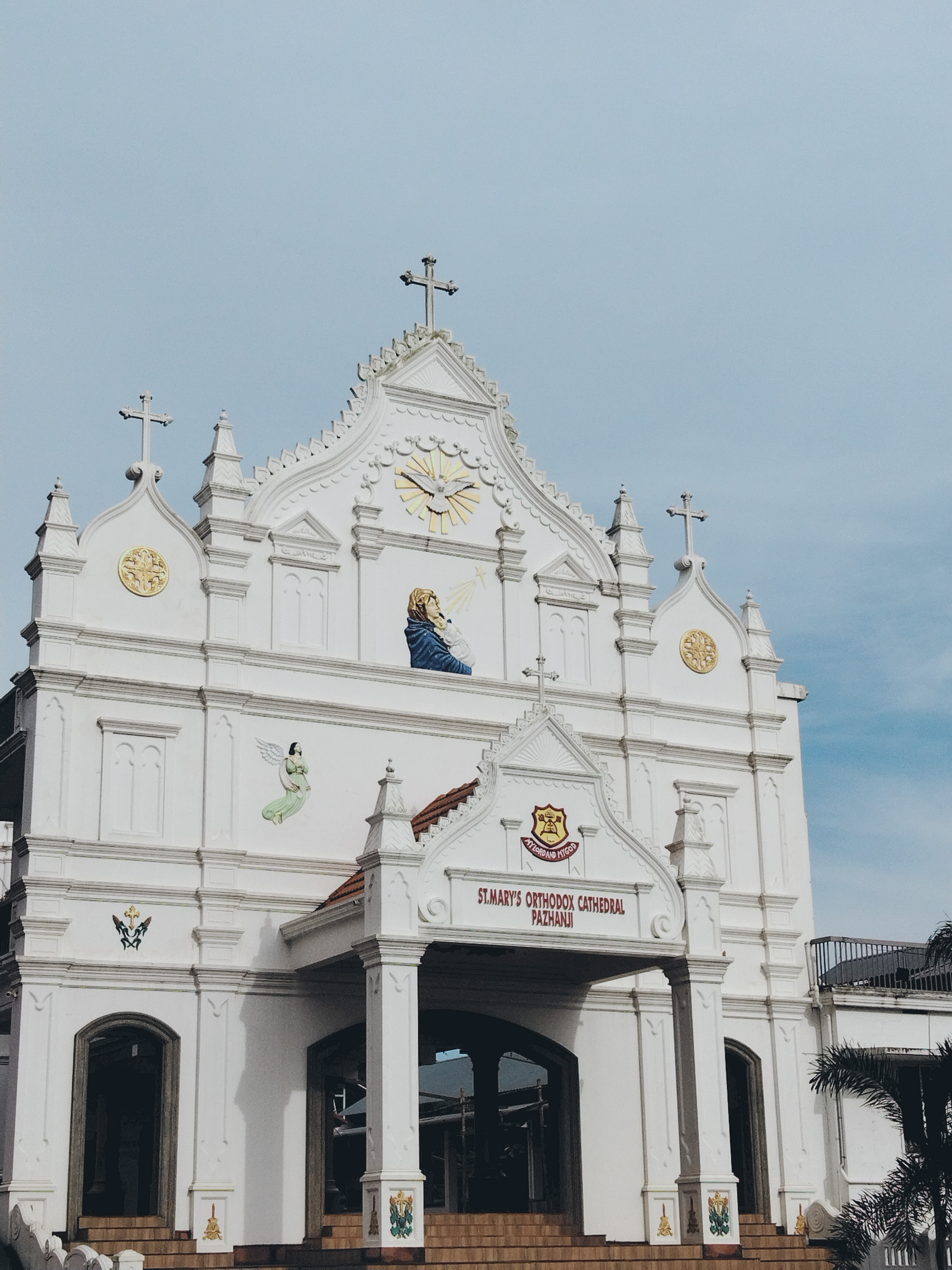
Old church building in 2022

The church is said to have been constructed by believers who fled from Arthat and later settled and constructed the church. It is how the name Pazhanji (Malayalam meaning Old boat) came into being for the place. According to the church's website, the ancestors of today's members of the Pazhanji Church earlier belonged to the Kunnamkulam Arthat Church. The first chapel founded in Pazhanji was situated in the northern side of the present church, whereas the chapel founded in the southern side. Both chapels are dedicated to St. Mary. There is a cemetery near the church. On 13 September 2015, the Pazhanji Cathedral was declared as the second cathedral of the Kunnamkulam diocese, the first being St. Mary's Cathedral, Arthat. On 28 July 2022, seven metropolitans were concentrated in this church. There were 31 bishops as of 2022.

== See also ==
- St. Mary's Orthodox Cathedral, Arthat
- Pazhanji
