= Chiravarampathukavu Bhagavathi Temple =

Hindu temple in Kerala, India

- Chiravarampathukavu Bhagavathi Temple, Pazhanji, Thrissur, Kerala

Religion
- Affiliation: Hinduism
- District: Thrissur
- Deity: Bhagavathy

Location
- Location: Pazhanji
- State: Kerala
- Country: India
- Interactive map of Chiravarampathukavu Bhagavathi Temple
- Coordinates: 10.6838°N 76.0641°E

Architecture
- Type: Architecture of Kerala

Specifications
- Temple: One
- Elevation: 23.22 m (76 ft)

Chiravarampathukavu Temple enshrines Bhagawati, the mother Goddess, one of the most popular deities in Kerala. The town of Aruvayi, Pazhanji is near the city of Kunnamkulam. The annual festival here is celebrated on the second Sunday of Kumbha (February). Over 35 committees are involved and over 75 elephants participate in this festival.
