= Thayyil Radhakrishnan =

Indian writer

- Born: Kunnamkulam, Thrissur district, Kerala, India
- Died: 11 August 2014; Trissur, Kerala, India
- Occupations: Doctor, writer
- Writing career
- Notable works: Sheen, Pataliputhram

Thayyil Radhakrishnan (died 11 August 2014) was a Malayalam novelist.

== Biography ==
Radhakrishnan was born to Adv.Sankarankutty Menon and Vilasini at Kunnamkulam, Thrissur district, Kerala, India. He completed his B.Sc course from Sree Kerala Varma College and did medical courses in Patna. Mangalore and Mumbai. His first Novel, Sheen won the Tagore award.

== Books ==
- Sheen
- Pataliputhram
- Nizhalukal Samsarikkunna Ayodhya
- Netravathi

== Award ==
- Tagore award
