= Places of worship in Kunnamkulam =

Hindus, Christians and Muslims live in harmony in Kunnamkulam. The religious tolerance of Kunnamkulam people can be seen from the “Ambala Palli - St.Matthias Church (located at south Bazar) which is a temple converted to a church wherein the temple character can be seen in the church entrance. Elohim Christian Church Akkikavu Kunnamkulam

There are four mosques in Kunnamkulam:

- Lower Parayil near Bhavana theatre

Wadakkanchery road near Byju theatre Guruvayoor road opposite E.M.S. shopping complex Town bus stand, Yatheem Khana building (no Friday prayer)

== Temples ==
- Thalakkottukara Siva Temple
- Kakkad Mahaganapathi Temple
- Kizhur Temple
- Panthallur
- Cheeramkulam Devi temple, Anaikkal
- Annakulangara
- Kakkad Subramannya temple
- Sreeramaswami temple Chiralayam
- Makkalikkavu Devi Temple, Thekkeppuram
- Subramanya swamy Temple, Kaniyampal
- Kavilakkad temple, Chittanjoor
- Parkadi Temple, Anjoor
- Sankarapuram Mahavishnu Temple
- Ubhayur Mahadeva Temple, Kanippayyur
- Ayyamkulangare Temple, Puthussery
- Kattakampal shiva temple
- Pengamuck shiva temple

The famous Srikrishna Temple in Guruvayur is located just 8 km away from Kunnamkulam.

== Churches ==
- Arthat St. Mary's Cathedral Church (Arthat Valliyapally), 999 CE
- Mar Behanam Chapel, Anjoor - Misc
- St. George Cathedral Church, Thozhiyur - Malabar Independent Syrian Church
- Arthat Mar Thoma Syrian church
- Nativity of Our Lady Church, Puthussery
- Kunnamkulam St. Lazarus Orthodox Old Church
- St.Sebastians catholic church
- Kunnamkulam St. Thomas Orthodox New Church
- Arthat St. Mary's Simhasana church (Tomb of St. Sleeba Mor Osthatheos)
- Kunnamkulam Main Road St. Gregorios Orthodox church
- Kunnakulam St.Thomas Hill Church - Misc
- Adupputty St. George Orthodox church (Feast of Adupatty church called as Kunnamkulam Pooram)
- St. Lazarus Orthodox church Chiralayam
- St. Paul's CSI Church,
- South Bazar St Mathiyas Orthodox Church (it is popularly known as Ambalam pally.)
- St. Mary's Orthodox Syrian Church Pazhanji Pazhanji Church (also known as Pazhanji Palli, https://www.facebook.com/pazhanjichurch)
- Pazhanji Brethren Assembly
- The Disciples Tabernacle Church Kunnamkulam
- Bethany Church
- Mar Joseph Church, Chaldean Syrian Church, Kunnamkulam
- St. George Orthodox Syrian Church, Mele Parayil Kunnamkulam
- St. Adhais Church, Porkulam - Misc
- St. Mary's Syrian Church, Pazhanji - Misc
- Kattakambal St. Ignatious Orthodox church
- Pengamuck Mar Baselios Mar Gregorios Orthodox church
- Pengamuck St. Peter's and St Paul's Orthodox Church
- Kottol church
- Akikavu St. Mary's Orthodox Church
- St. George's Church Kallupuram - Misc
