= Bangalore Diocese =

Diocese of Bangalore may refer to:

- Bangalore Orthodox Diocese
- Roman Catholic Archdiocese of Bangalore
