= Osthathios Pathros =

Syriac Orthodox bishop (1963–2022)

His Grace and Mor Osthathios Pathros
- Metropolitan of Bangalore Diocese; Patriarchal Vicar of Singapore
- Church: Syriac Orthodox Church
- Diocese: Bangalore
- See: Holy Apostolic See of Antioch & All East

Orders
- Ordination: 6 August 1995 by Thomas Timotheos
- Consecration: 3 July 2006 by Baselios Thomas I
- Rank: Metropolitan

Personal details
- Born: 12 November 1963 Kunnamkulam, Kerala, India
- Died: 20 August 2022 (aged 58) Coimbatore, Tamil Nadu, India
- Parents: P.C Chacko (father); Salome Chacko (mother)
- Education: Madras University (BA); M.S.O.T. Seminary; Bishop’s College, Calcutta (BD); Dharmaram Vidya Kshetram (MTh)

Osthathios Pathros (12 November 1963 – 20 August 2022) was an Indian Syriac Orthodox bishop, and Metropolitan of Bangalore Diocese. He belonged to the Pulikottil family of Kunnamkulam. He took the initiative in the formation of Coimbatore Christian Ecumenical Fellowship.

== Education ==
Osthathios Pathros had a Bachelor of Arts degree in English Literature from the Madras University. He has also studied at the Malankara Syrian Orthodox Theological Seminary in Mulanthuruthy for a diploma in Theological Studies and joined the Calcutta Bishop's College for Bachelor of Divinity from the Serampore University. He also had a Master of Theology degree from Dharmaram Vidya Kshetram in Bangalore.

== Death ==
He died on 20 August 2022, at the age of 58.
