= C. V. Sreeraman =

Indian writer (1931–2007)

- Born: 7 February 1931; Porkulam, Kingdom of Cochin
- Died: 10 October 2007 (aged 76); Thrissur, Kerala, India
- Occupation: Writer
- Writing career
- Period: 1952-2007
- Genre: Short story

Cheruthuruthy Velappan Sreeraman (7 February 1931 – 11 October 2007) was an Indian writer who wrote short stories in Malayalam. He was the Vice Chairman of Kerala Sahitya Akademi. C. V. Sreeraman's stories stand foremost core to the theme, as exemplified by his Anayasena Maranam (Dying an Easy Death) and Railway Palangal (The Rails). He won the prestigious Kendra Sahitya Academy Award in 1999 for his collection of short stories Sreeramante Kathakal and Kerala Sahitya Academy Award for the collection Vasthuhara.

== Biography ==
Born on 7 February 1931, at Porkulam, Kerala to Velappan and Janaki, Sreeraman spent a part of his childhood in Sri Lanka. He studied in Government High School, Kunnamkulam; T.M. H. S., Perumbilavu; St. Thomas College, Thrissur and St. Aloysius College, Mangalore and took degree in law from the Madras Law College.

For seven years, he worked in the Rehabilitation Department of the Andaman and Nicobar Islands, which provided the theme for some his stories. A Communist right from his student days, Sreeraman served as the president of Chovvanur panchayat for seven years and was actively associated with the pro-Communist Party of India (Marxist) cultural outfit Purogamana Kala Sahitya Sangham. He was a member of the Kerala Sahitya Akademi Executive Committee from 1988 to 1991. His residence in Kongunoor near Kunnamkulam, Thrissur was a hub for Malayalam writers from the district.

Sreeraman died on 10 October 2007 at Jubilee Mission hospital in Thrissur. He was being treated for liver and renal problems. He was 76 and survived by wife and three children.

== Writing ==
Sreeraman wrote his first story Oru Puthiya Samararoopam while studying at St. Thomas College, Thrissur. His works include Puthuma Illathavarude Nagaram, Chidambaram, Kshurasyadhara, Theerthakkavadi, Dukhitharude Dukham, Puramkazhchakal, Vasthuhara, Chakshu Sravanagalasthamam, Pondhan Mada, Sheema Thampuran and Entosy Valiamma. His stories were translated into English and German, and several Indian languages, including Hindi, Bengali, Tamil, Kannada, Telugu, Marathi and Oriya. The visual quality of his narration attracted filmmakers. Vasthuhara, Chidambaram (G. Aravindan), Purushartham (K. R. Mohanan) and Ponthan Mada (T. V. Chandran) were based on Sreeraman's stories.

== Bibliography ==
The following are the works published by C. V. Sreeraman.

Year	Title	Publisher	Notes
1980	Vasthuhara	Kottayam: NBS	Collection of 12 stories
1983	Dukhitharude Dukham	Trivandrum: Chintha	With an introduction by P. Govinda Pillai
1984	Kshurasyadhara	Kottayam: SPCS	
1986	Chidambaram	Calicut: PK Brothers	With an introduction by Ravindran
1987	Soonima	Kottayam: DC Books	
1991	Entosy Valiamma	Trivandrum: Chintha	Collection of 8 stories
1991	Puthuma Illathavarude Nagaram	Thrissur: Current	Collection of 10 stories With an introduction by M. K. Sanu
1991	Theerthakkavadi	Kottayam: SPCS	
1993	Urlos	Thrissur: Current	Collection of 9 stories
1996	Chakshu Sravana Galasthamam	Calicut: Poorna	Collection of 18 stories
1997	Sreeramante Kathakal	Thrissur: Current	Collection of 75 stories With an introduction by V. Aravindakshan
1999	Amma Arinjirunnu	Kottayam: SPCS	Collection of 11 stories
2000	Ishtadanam	Thrissur: Current	Collection of 9 stories
2001	Pamban Palathinum Mumbu	Thrissur: Current	Collection of 19 stories
2002	Mokshartham	Kottayam: DC Books	Collection of 13 stories
2002	Kathakal: C. V. Sreeraman	Thrissur: Current	Collection of 47 stories and 5 memoirs
2004	Souhridam Barile Visheshangal	Kottayam: DC Books	Collection of 12 stories
2004	Retrenchment Mela	Kayamkulam: Sithara Books	Collection of 10 stories and 2 memoirs
2004	Ente Piyapetta Kathakal	Thrissur: Green Books	
2005	Dodi Diye Bandhalam	Calicut: Mathrubhumi	Collection of 15 stories

== See also ==
- C. V. Sreeraman Award
