= West Mangad =

Village in Kerala, India

West Mangad is a village in Porkulam Panchayath. It is in Thrissur district in the state of Kerala, India. It is 5 km west to Kunnamkulam town and 1.5 km south to Pazhanji. St. Joseph's and St. Cyrils Higher Secondary School is situated in this village. There are two temples and a Christian church seen in surrounding of the village, many small scale companies are active now. The village is famous for its religious harmony. There is another village in Thrissur district with the same name, so it is commonly known as Pazhanji Mangad. There are three local celebrations in the village they are Mangad Temple pooram (On bharani day Kumba month-most probably march), Kottiyattumukk temple pooram, and Mangad church perunal(September 14,15). It comes under Porkulam grama panchayath and Kunnamkulam legislative assembly.
