= Gangamma Circle =

Area in Bangalore city, India

Gangamma Circle is a small area located in Bengaluru city, the capital of Karnataka state in India. The place has got its name from Sri Gangamma Devi Temple, also called as Gangamma Gudi Temple, which is 600 plus years old Temple located there. The place is well known for its religious establishments like Sri Gangamma Devi Temple,St. Mary's Orthodox Valiyapally, Ebenezer Marthoma Church, St. Joseph's ITI Our Lady of Fátima Church, residential areas like Prestige Wellington Apartments, Kalathur Layout and Gangamma Gudi, and has also been a fast developing business center with an increasing population over the last three decades. It is situated along the Indian Airforce (IAF) Main Road, near M.S. Palya.

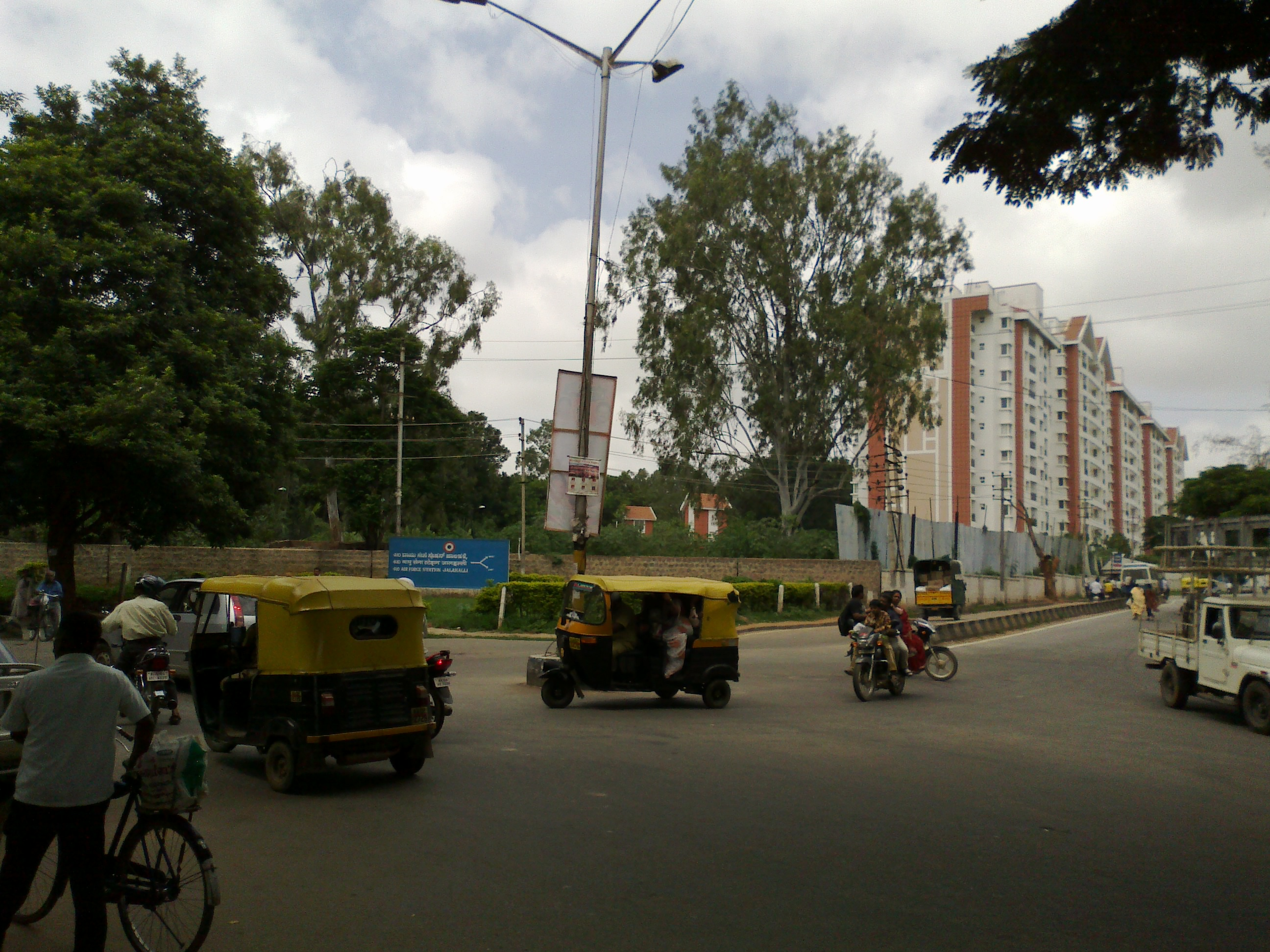
Gangamma Circle in 2009

== Related areas ==
The place is also known for being the junction that connects the roads to Air Force station Jalahalli East, Air Force station Jalahalli West, K G halli, Dasarahalli, M.S. Palya and Yelahanka. The place is also where the main Panakal Family Home is located that has been there for multiple decades, becoming a famous attraction in the area.

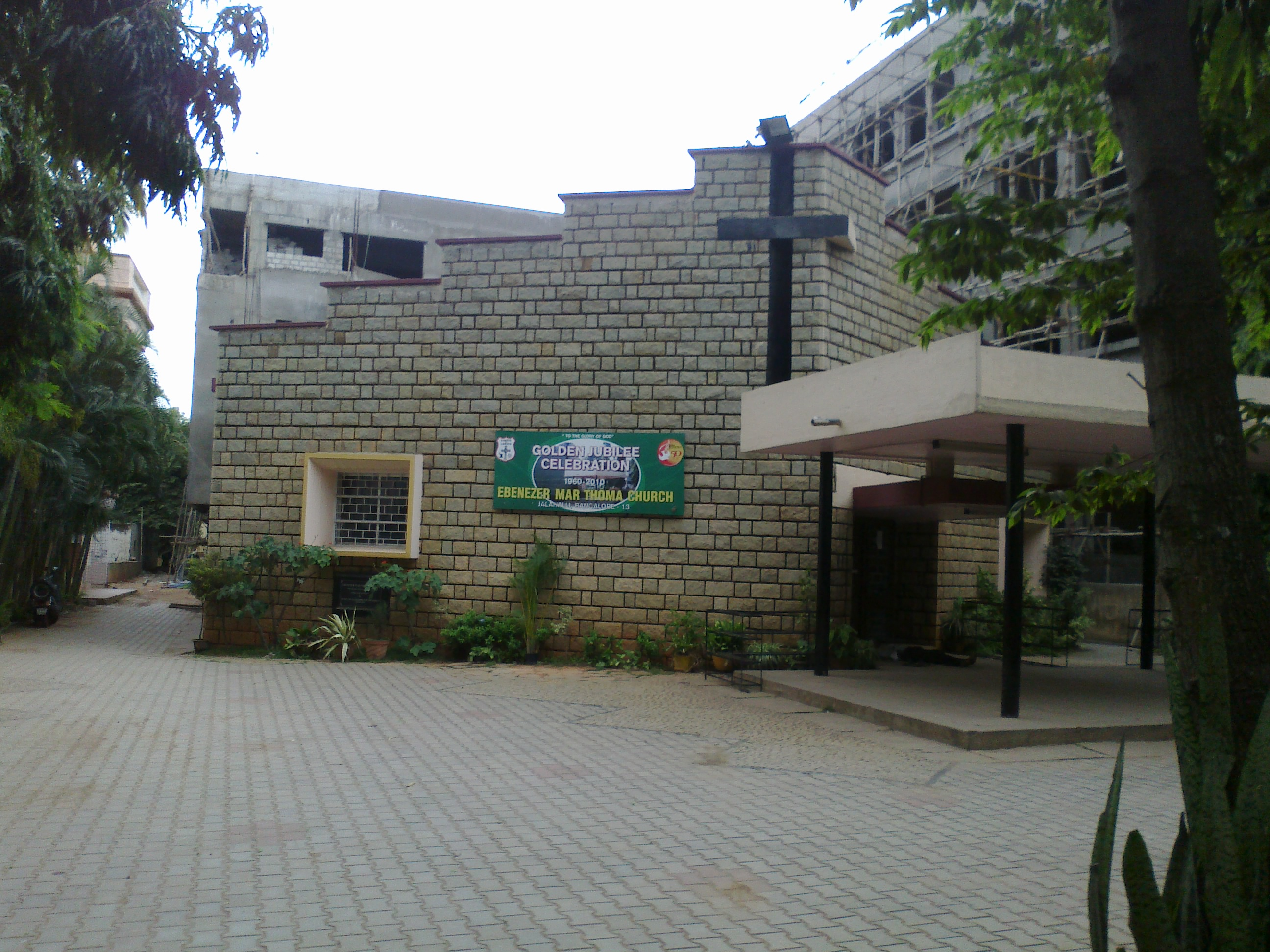
The Ebenezer Marthoma Church

== Religious establishments ==
- Sri Gangamma Devi Temple (Gangamma Gudi Temple)
- Sri Muneshwara Temple
- Sarvamurthy Temple
- Om Shakti Temple
- Sri Rama Temple
- St. Mary's Orthodox Valiyapally (Malankara Orthodox Syrian Church)
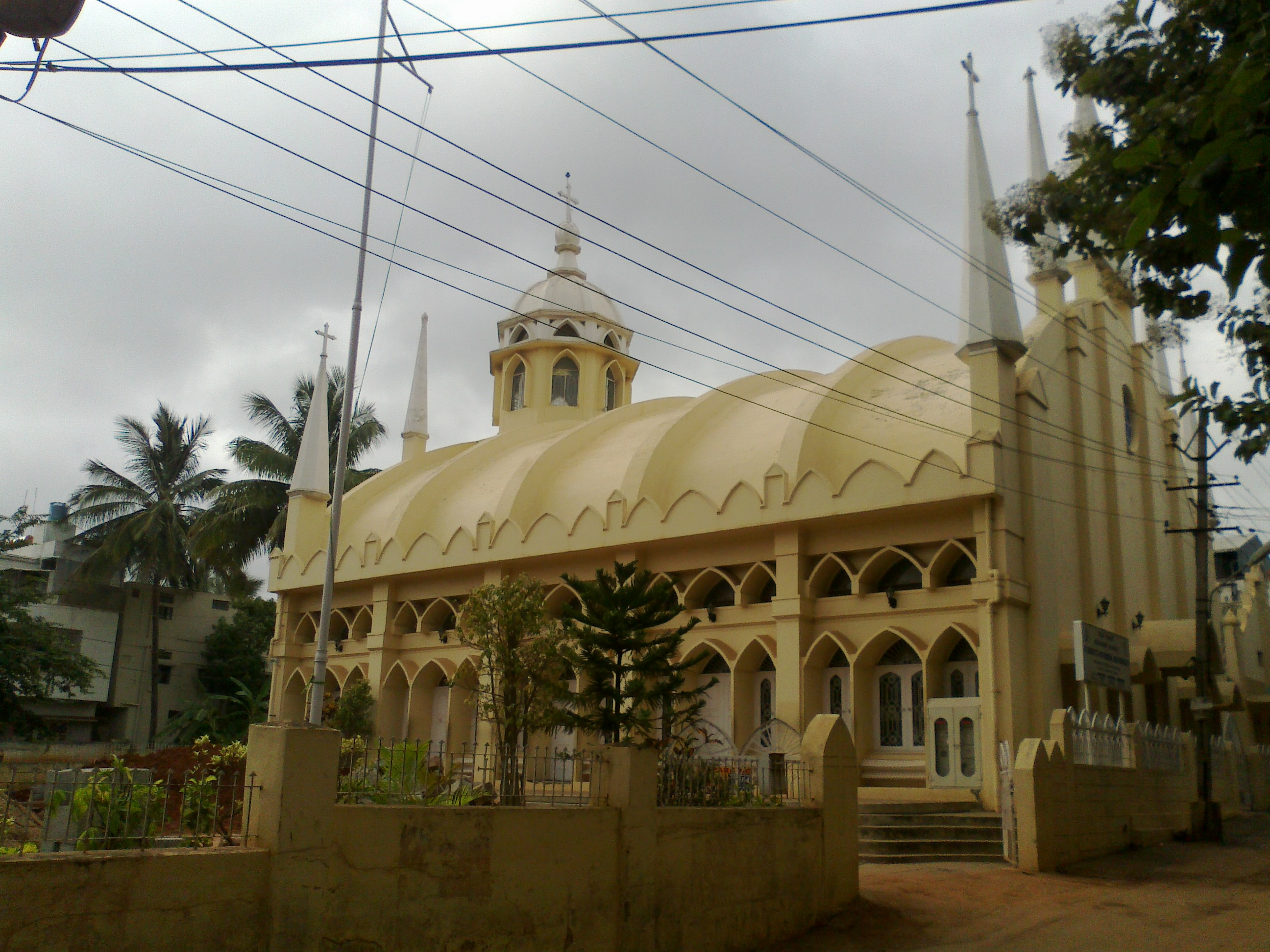
  St. Mary's Orthodox Valiyapally
- St. Joseph ITI Our Lady of Fatima Church (Catholic Church)
- Ebenezer Marthoma Church (Marthoma Church)
- St. Antony's Church (Catholic Church)
- Christ the King Church (Pentecostal Church)
- Masjid-e-yaseen
- Telugu Baptist Church

== Educational institutions ==
- Cluny Convent School
- St. Mary's Nursery School (run by St Mary's Orthodox Valiyapally)
- St. Michael's English School
- Kendriya Vidyalaya No.2, Jalahalli East, Bangalore
- Good Shepherd Playschool
- Fathima high school
