= Ramachandrapura =

Village near Bangalore, India

Coordinates: 13°52′N 75°04′E

Ramachandrapura (Hosanagar - Shivamogga) is a small village and neighbourhood located in the outskirts of India's fifth-largest metropolitan area, Bangalore. It is accessible through Doddabommasandra and Jalahalli and Main Ramachandrapura Mutt was located in Hosanagar Shivamogga Dist.
