= St. Matthias' Church, Kunnamkulam =

Church in Kerala, India

South Bazar Church
- South Bazar St. Matthia's Church
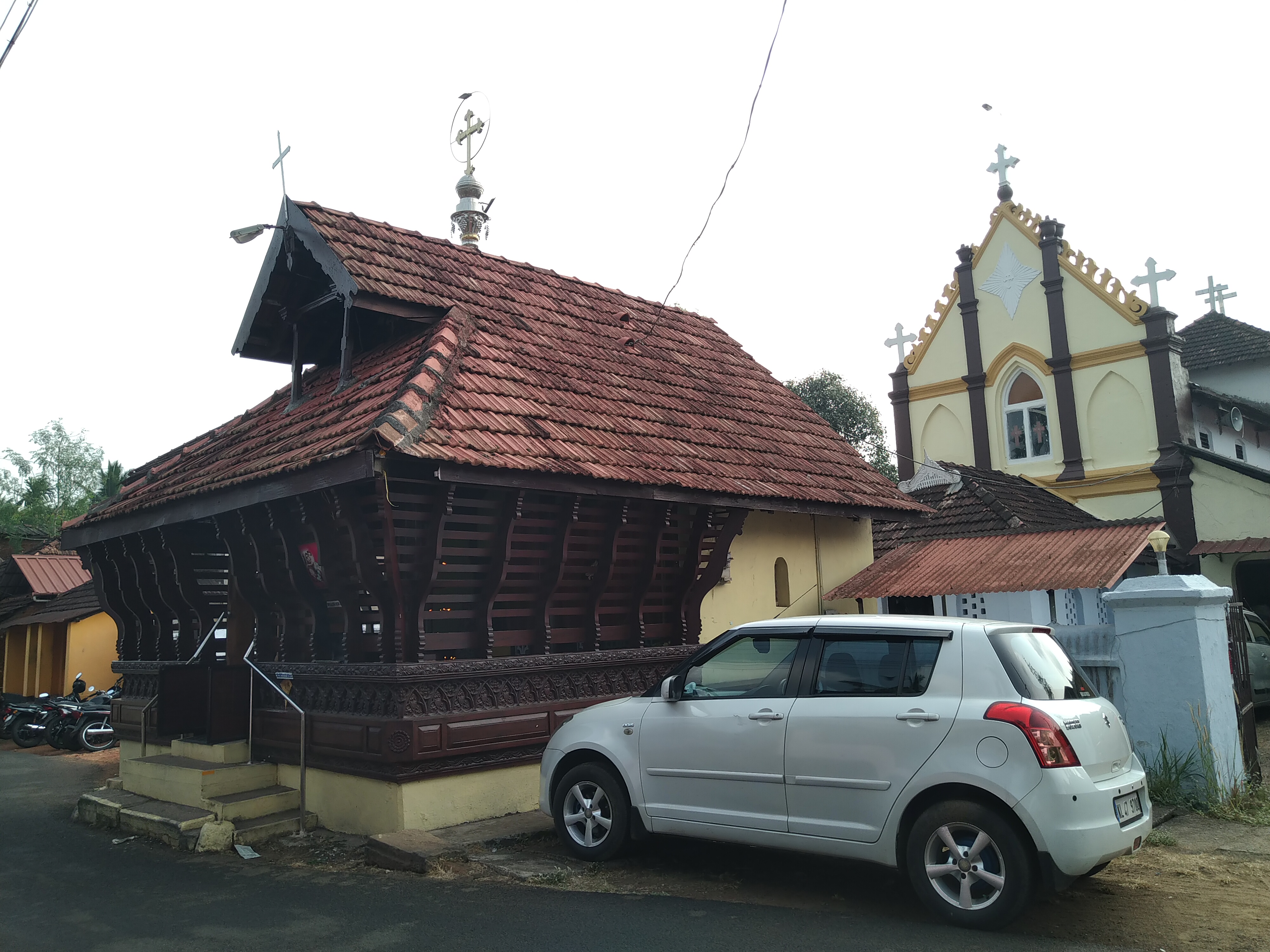
- St. Matthia's Church, Kunnamkulam
- South Bazar Church
- Country: India
- Denomination: Malankara Orthodox Syrian Church

History
- Founded: 18th century

Administration
- Diocese: Kunnamkulam Orthodox Diocese

Clergy
- Bishop: Baselios Mar Thoma Paulose II

St. Matthias' Church, also known as the South Bazar Church, is a parish of the Malankara Orthodox Syrian Church situated at Kunnamkulam in the Thrissur district of Kerala, India. It is commonly known as Ambala Palli.

It is a temple which is converted into a church in the 18th century old, and it is situated at the middle of south bazar, north of the Anjoor-Kunnamkulam road and west of the Guruvayoor-Kunnamkulam road.

The church was converted from a Hindu temple at the behest of Shakthan Thampuran, the king of Cochin after the request of the Christians. The architectural style of the temple was retained, making the church's appearance distinctive.
