= Kanippayyur Shankaran Namboodiripad =

Kanippayyur Shankaran Namboodiripad (1891-1981) was a Nambudiri Brahmin in the State of Kerala in India who helped rejuvenate interest in the Indian traditional architectural styles known collectively as Vastu shastra. He was a consultant for the renovation of many temples in Kerala, Tamil Nadu and Karnataka, and also the Royal Architect for the three royal families of Travancore, Cochin and Kozhikode (Calicut). He was a prolific writer authoring more than a hundred books on a variety of books relating to traditional knowledge areas like vastu shastra (architecture), jyothisha (astrology and astronomy), ayurveda (Indian system of medicine), and also books on history. He compiled a Sanskrit-Malayalam Dictionary and a Dictionary of Indigenous Medicines.

Sankaran Namboodiripad was born as the ninth child of Kanippayyur Subramanian Namboothiripad, who himself was a great scholar in vasthu vidya, and Kanippayyur Kali Antharjanam. (According to some legends, after Parasurama created Kerala from the sea, the practice of various professions essential for the society were distributed among different families. In this process, Kanippayyur was a Namboothiri family to which was assigned the profession of architecture and construction of temples.) He had his traditional primary education and Rig Vedic studies at home. He took higher lessons in Rigveda at the famous Vedic School at Thrissur and became well versed in Sthapathya Veda and Astrology under the tutelage of his elders. He also studied Ayurveda. He rejuvenated Vaastu Shastra and popularized it further. He also started work centers for making icons and other ancillaries connected with temples. Kannippayur Narayanan Namboothiripad is often quoted from this family nowadays as he is a renowned Astrologer appearing in TV Shows, Online etc.

== Panchangam Press ==
In 1929, Shankaran Namboodiripad established a printing press in Kunnamkulam to print mainly the almanacs prepared by him and other members of his family. The press, named Panchangam Press, has developed into an icon of Kunnakulam producing books related to Hindu religious practices. The press has brought out works on many knowledge systems like Vedas, Brahmanas, Aranyakas, Upanishads, Vedangas, Upavedas, Epics and Puranas, Tantra, Mantra, classical Sanskrit literature, etc.

== Research Library ==
The descendants of Kanippayyur Shankaran Namboodiripad have established a research library in memory of Shankaran Namboodiripad at Kunnamkulam to continue the scholarly traditions of learning and research established by him. The Library founded in 1990 aims to be a repository of palm leaf manuscripts and books related to traditional Indian systems of knowledge, and to be a center for the propagation of such knowledge by bringing out translations of works in these knowledge areas. The Library also aims to be a pioneer in the popularization of Sanskrit language among the younger generation. The Library has procured large collections of manuscripts and books held in many Namboothiri houses.

== Works ==
- Ent̲e smaraṇakaḷ
- Āryanmāruṭe kuṭiyēt̲t̲aṃ, Kēraḷattil (4 Vols.)
- Vaidyaratnaṃ auṣadhanighaṇṭu : Grāhyāṃśaṃ Aṭaṅṅiyatȧ. Sampādakan
- Nāyanmāruṭe pūrvvacaritr̲aṃ.
