= Pengamuck =

- village
- Location in Kerala, India Pengamuck (India)
- Coordinates: 10.6761000°N 76.035750°E
- Country: India
- State: Kerala
- District: Thrissur

Languages
  - Official: Malayalam, English
- Time zone: UTC+5:30 (IST)
- Postal code: 680544
- Vehicle registration: KL-48

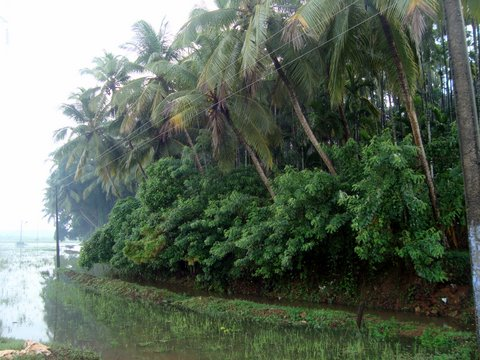

Pengamuck is a village 32 kilometers from Thrissur in the state of Kerala, India. The word "pengamuck" literally means place of areca nuts, which are grown in the area. Kerala's biggest areca market is at Pazhanji, just 2 kilometers from Pengamuck.
