= Shettihalli =

Shettihalli Jalahalli West
- Village
- Country: India
- State: Karnataka
- District: Bangalore District

Government
  - Type: Panchayat raj
  - Body: Gram panchayat

Languages
  - Official: Kannada
- Time zone: UTC+5:30 (IST)
- PIN: 560015
- Telephone code: 2837
- ISO 3166 code: IN-KA
- Vehicle registration: KA
- Nearest city: Tumkur
- Website: karnataka.gov.in

Shettihalli is the Ward No. 12 of the 200 wards of BBMP Bangalore. It is part of the Dasarahalli Assembly constituency. Shri S.Muniraju (from BJP) was the MLA (2008–2017). Shri Manjunath is the present MLA(2017-onwards)(from JDS) The village Shettihalli is part of ward 12, Shettihalli Ward. The other villages of this ward include Mederahalli, Mallasandra, Dasarahalli, Kammagondanahalli and Abbigere. One of the developing areas is Shettihalli. From Shettihalli it is just five minutes to Jalahalli metro station, 15 minutes to Yeshwanthpur railway station, 35 minutes to Bangalore International Airport ltd, five minutes to Tumkur highway, and 15 minutes to Orion Mall. There are many stationery, grocery, and department stores like A.J Mart, Metro mini bazaar, Krishna bakery, quality stationery shop, and De needs in Shettihalli. Landmarks are Prince town, Eskay Hospital, and Prince Royal which are the proud landmarks of Shettihalli.

Shettihalli has a wildlife sanctuary in its vicinity.

== See also ==
- South India
- Wildlife of India
