= St. Mary's Orthodox Cathedral, Arthat =

Oriental Orthodox cathedral in Kerala, India

Arthat St. Mary's Orthodox Cathedral
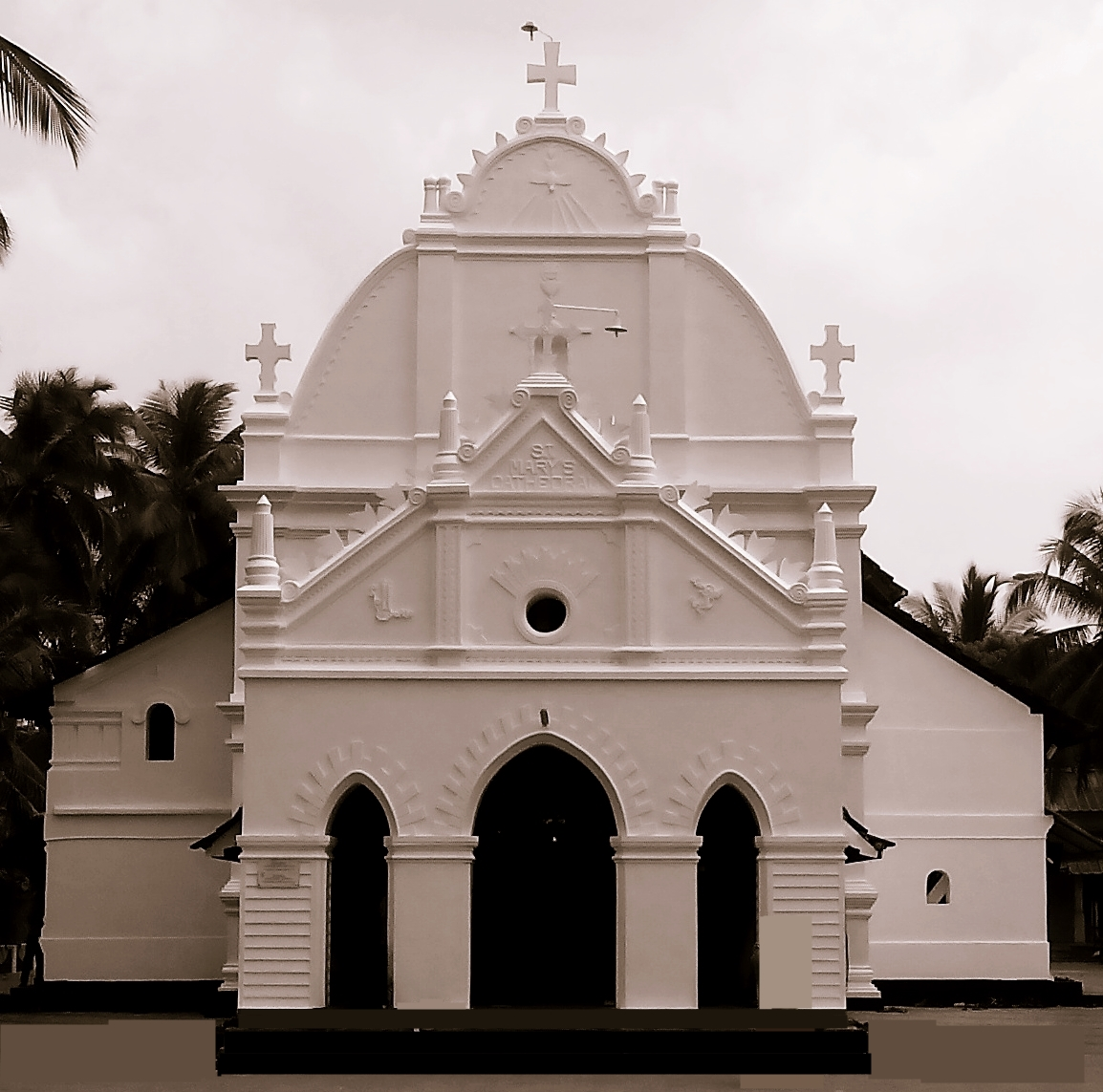
- Arthat St. Mary's Cathedral

Religion
- Affiliation: Malankara Orthodox Syrian Church
- District: Thrissur
- Province: Kerala
- Ecclesiastical or organizational status: Cathedral

Location
- Location: Arthat, Kunnamkulam, Thrissur, Kerala, India
- Interactive map of Arthat St. Mary's Orthodox Cathedral
- Coordinates: 10°37′58″N 76°3′29″E

Architecture
- Type: Church
- Style: Kerala Architecture
- Direction of façade: West

Website
- arthatcathedral.org

Arthat St. Mary's Orthodox Cathedral (Arthat Valiyapally), also called Kunnamkulam-Chattukulangara Church, is an ancient Oriental Orthodox church located in Arthat village of Thalapilly taluk, one mile south of Kunnamkulam town, in Thrissur district, Kerala, India. It is one of the oldest Christian churches in the region. This church did not participate in the Synod of Diamper. During the invasion of Tipu Sultan, the church was arsoned and later reconstructed.

== History ==
=== Chattukulangara Pally and late 20th-century historiography ===
Joseph Cheeran, a former vicar of the church

A local belief originating in the late 20th century holds that Saint Thomas came to a region near present-day Kunnamkulam where a Jewish community had settled. According to traditional beliefs, Saint Thomas preached to the Jews and many were converted to Christianity. The Jewish synagogue in that area is said to have been converted into a Christian church, which Jacob Cheeran an Orthodox priest identifies as Chattukulangara Pally. It is also said that Saint Thomas came to Judakunnu (Jew Hill), where there was a water scarcity. The people appealed to him for help, and he is said to have whipped the ground on the hilltop, causing a spring of fresh water to appear. This is said to have later been called Chattakkulam (Malayalam: ചാട്ടക്കുളം), and it is hypothesised that the church near it came to be known as Chattakkulangara Pally. In contrast to this 20th-century identification, the traditional site for the establishment of a Christian community in the region has been the Palayur Church at least since the 14th century. Cheeran also claimed that the Palayoor Church previously belonged to the Arthat church as a chapel. He stated that the real Paloor church is Arthat church and claimed that the book Jornada by Antonio de Gouvea and Francis Buchanan's account of the Arthat church support his theory. However, Cheeran's theory has been criticised even by fellow Orthodox scholars such as Kurian Thomas Maledath, who compared Cheeran's books to children's literature and noted his theory as ambitious and localistic.

=== Synod of Diamper and Coonan Cross Oath ===
Antonio de Gouvea, a Portuguese missionary and chronicler of Dom Alexis de Menezes, records in his book Jornada Dom Alexis de Menezes about the church of Palur and other churches present nearby in the Kingdom of Zamorin. He writes that on his way he was given letters from the Cassanars and Vicars whom from the Synod he had sent to the church of Pallur (Palayur), dedicated to the glorious Saint Cyriac Martyr, the last of this Christian community on the Northern side, in the lands of the king Samorin five leagues from Panane (Ponnani), a place well-known to the Portuguese and to their fleets, which meant to them a big disturbance with which the devil had deceived all those people, and the people of Anamaque (Enammavu) and Mutem (Mattam) and Chatacolangaree (Chattukulangara or Arthat Kunnamkulam), all in the lands of the king Samorin, and close to each other. In 1772, Kattumangattu Bishop sent a letter to Sakthan Thampuran which states that in Thalappilli there was only one church existing in that region, which was Chattukulangara Palli. There were two more chapels also present in that region: Chiralayam and Pazhanji (dedicated to Geverghese Sahada). Starting from the Coonan Cross Oath of 1653, both factions of Malankara Nasranis wanted to take over the church. Because of the dispute, the church was closed for a while. In 1805, at their request, the then King of Cochin, Sakthan Thampuran, came to Arthat church to resolve the problem. Both parties agreed to a lucky draw. In the draw, the main church and buildings went to the Malankara Puthenkoor Syrians, and the stone cross of the church went to the Pazhayakoor Syrians.

=== Tipu Sultan's invasion and destruction ===
In 1789, Tipu Sultan attacked and set fire to this church. Folklore states that Tipu's army killed a priest in the altar room, and his blood spilled there. Since it was considered impure, part of the altar was cut and removed. Hence, this church was also called Vetti muricha pally (Malayalam: വെട്ടി മുറിച്ച പള്ളി, lit. 'cut altar church'). The altar of this church remains distinct from those in other churches. The Coral Missionary Magazine of 1876 gives an account of the Arthat church in Kunnamkulam. It notes that the Syrians had probably been settled in this part of Cochin for centuries, though not in the present town of Kunnankulam, as they had traditions that their forefathers lived near the old church of Arthat, about a mile from Kunnankulam. This old church had no village or bazaar near it, but the Syrians said it was formerly surrounded by a large bazaar, but that in consequence of a destructive fire, the inhabitants removed to the place where the present town of Kunnankulam stood. The church was still regarded by them with great veneration as their parish church, and as the burial place of their forefathers, and was in fact their only cemetery, with no interments being allowed in the churchyards in the town. This old church was burnt by Tippoo when he invaded Cochin in the last century; only the walls were left standing. It had since been re-roofed and thoroughly repaired, and was then one of the finest and most spacious Syrian churches in the country. There was another ancient church at Palur, near Chowghaut, about six miles from Kunnankulam, which was one of the seven churches said to have been founded by St. Thomas. This church was then in the possession of the Roman Catholics. Numbers of Syrians, however, were present at the principal festival of the church every year. The Syrians of Kunnankulam were known anciently as the Chátukulangare Syrians, from a large tank bearing that name, and it was recorded that they never acknowledged the authority of the Roman Archbishop Menezes in the 16th century when the Syrian church came under the influence of this emissary of Rome. It was a very interesting circumstance that there were no representatives of the Chátukulangare Syrians at the famous Synod of Udiamparur (Diamper).

=== Relations with the Anglican Mission ===
In 1800, Francis Buchanan visited this church and met Pulikkottil Ittoop Ramban (later Pulikkottil Joseph Mar Dionysious I, also known as Dionysius II). In 1806, the Arthat Padiyola (resolution) declared a break from the chains of Rome, Babylon, and Antioch. In 1808, Claudius Buchanan and Colin Macaulay visited and awarded a large gold medal to this principal church in the name of all Syrian churches in Malabar. According to an account of the visit, Colonel Macaulay accompanied Buchanan from Cochin to the famous Shanscrit college at Trichur and thence to a district of the Syrian Christians which Buchanan had not before visited. It was named by Hyder, Nazarani Ghur or the city of the Nazarenes. It was a beautiful place, fertile and populous. The town was four square, having four gates built on the side of a hill with steps cut in the rock from street to street, surrounded by lofty groves of palm and other trees. A verdant meadow wound about the foot of the hill and the whole country was a scene of hill and dale. The priests and people knew Buchanan and received them with great affection. Colonel Macaulay accompanied Buchanan to the principal church. Having signified his intention of presenting a large gold medal to this church in the name of all the Syrian churches in Malayalam, a vast concourse of people assembled. The medal, which was about three times as large as a college gold medal, exhibited the baptism of Jesus in Jordan elegantly executed and on the reverse a child brought to be baptized. Buchanan placed it on the altar in the presence of the people with due solemnity and beside it a gift to the poor. This church has the largest cemetery (1 hectare) of all churches in Kerala. The present cemetery wall was built on the initiative of Geevarghese Mar Gregorios of Malankara.

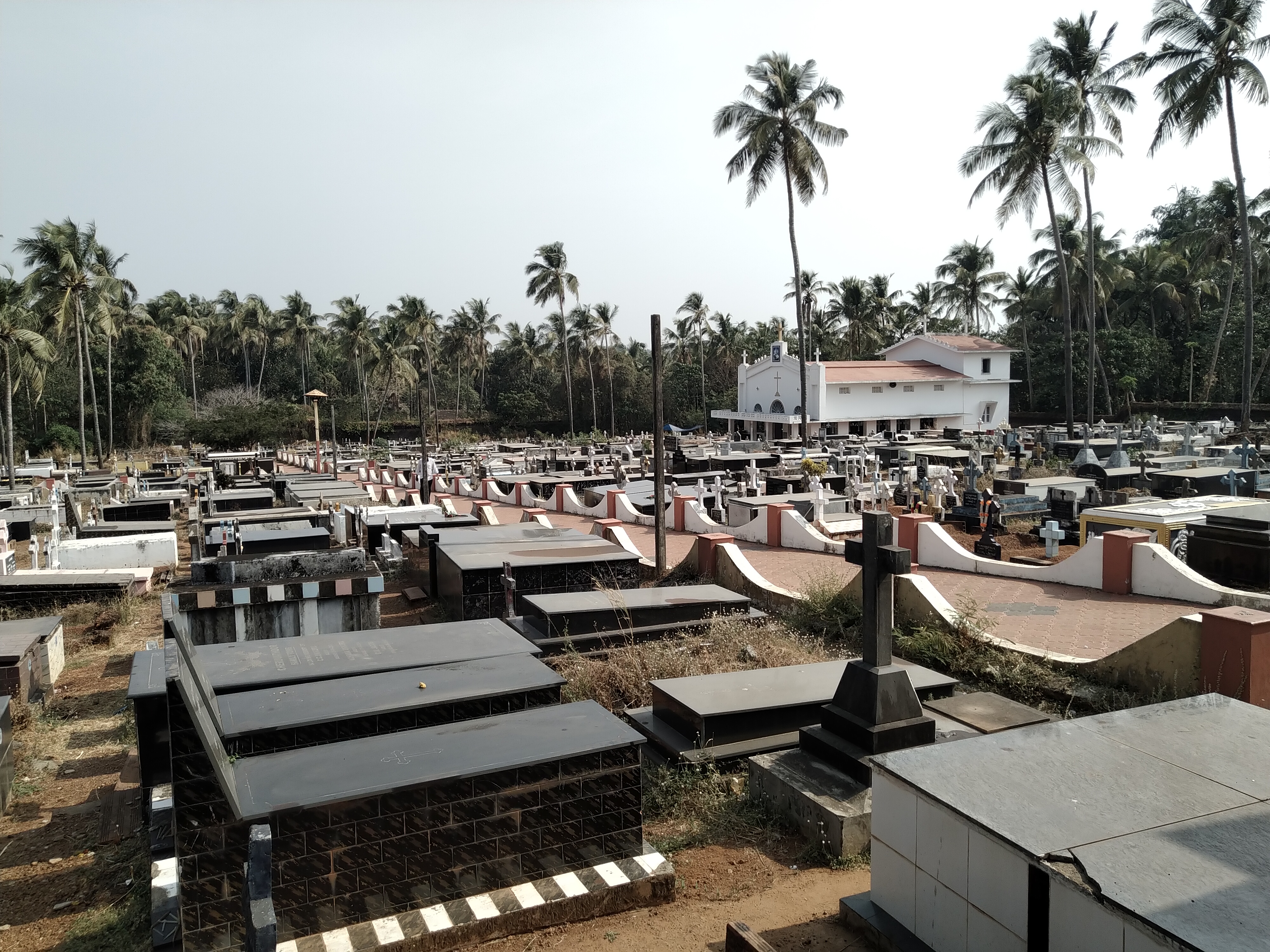
The largest cemetery in Kerala

== Church architecture ==
The church was originally built in the Kerala architectural style with a thatched roof of coconut palm leaves. During the attack by Tipu Sultan, the church was set on fire. Later, the church was rebuilt with a wooden roof covered with clay tiles. Mar Dionysius II, when he was a ramban (monk), was instrumental in rebuilding the church to its present state. The current structure was built between 1805 and 1827 CE.

== Church feud ==
A feud between the Patriarch faction and the Catholicos faction led the Patriarch faction to establish another church called Arthat St. Mary's Simhasana Church in 1920.

=== List of parishes separated from Arthat church ===
The following are the parishes separated from this church:

Chiralayam

Kottappady (Kaveed/Perakam)

Anjoor

Puthusseri

Chowwannoor (Marathamcodu/Pazhunnana/Vellarakkadu/Eyyal/Parembadam)

Guruvayoor

Chemmannoor

Vylathoor (Attupuram)

Parannoor

== 2017 storm ==
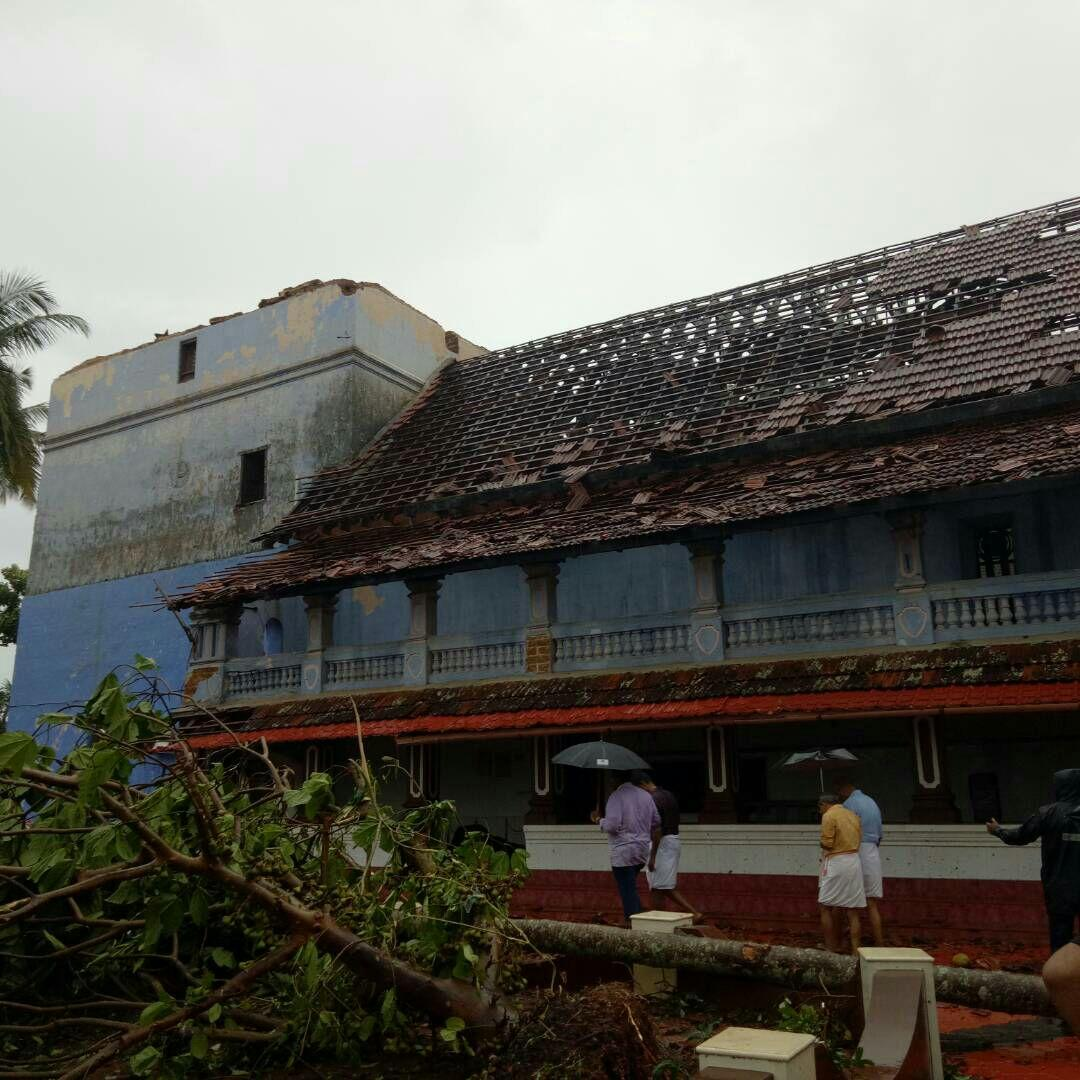
Church's rooftop damaged in the storm

On 25 June 2017, a hurricane caused great damage to churches in Arthat. The small, old St. Thomas Catholic church had to be reconstructed as a result.

== In literature ==
The history of the church is well narrated in the fiction novel Francis Itticora by T. D. Ramakrishnan.
