= Pazhanji =

- Residential area / Town
- Nickname: Arecanut Market
- Location in Kerala, India Pazhanji (India)
- Coordinates: 10.688480°N 76.050480°E
- Country: India
- State: Kerala
- District: Thrissur

Government
  - Type: Village

Population (2011)
  - Total: 14,067

Languages
  - Official: Malayalam, English
- Time zone: UTC+5:30 (IST)
- PIN: 680542
- Vehicle registration: KL-8, KL-48

Pazhanji is a village with near Kunnamkulam in Thrissur district in the state of Kerala, India. The name "Pazhanji" is derived from the Malayalam word for "old".

== Demographics ==
As of 2011 India census, Pazhanji had a population of 14,067 with 6,646 males and 7,421 females. Pazhanji is in the Kattakambal panchayat.

== Economy ==
Pazhanji is well known for its areca nut market and Pazhanji Palli / Pazhanji Church. The market is a hub for areca nut merchants from Monday through Saturday. This is where local areca nut (അടയ്ക്ക) sellers sell their product to authorised areca nut merchants. Buyers and sellers execute trade transactions by auction. Daily operations commence at 8 am and continue until 10:30 am.

The place is located in the Kattakambal Gram Panchayath.

== Transportation ==
Pazhanji is located approximately 32 kilometres from Trichur city. Trichur or Guruvayur Railway Station or Nedumbasseri International Airport is connected to reach Pazhanji [approximately 80 km from Cochin]. From the railway station/airport a road connects Kunnamkulam and then reaches Pazhanji.

== Pazhanji Church ==
Pazhanji Church officially known as St. Mary's Orthodox Cathedral, Pazhanji or Pazhanji Cathedral is a Malankara Orthodox Syrian Church situated at Pazhanji near Kunnamkulam in Thrissur District of Kerala, India. The Church is locally called " Pazhanji Palli " (In Malayalam : പഴഞ്ഞി പള്ളി ) "Palli" [similar to the Malayalam word for "Church"]. It is a part of the Malankara Orthodox Syrian Church.

The church is said to have been constructed by believers who fled from Arthat and later settled and constructed the church. It is how the name Pazhanji (Malayalam meaning Old) came into being for the place. According to the church's website, the ancestors of today's members of the Pazhanji Church earlier belonged to the Kunnamkulam Arthat Church. The first chapel founded in Pazhanji was situated in the northern side of the present church, whereas the chapel founded in the southern side. Both chapels are dedicated to St. Mary. There is a cemetery near the church. On 13 September 2015, the Pazhanji Cathedral was declared as the second cathedral of the Kunnamkulam diocese, the first being St. Mary's Cathedral, Arthat.

== Education ==
- Mar Dionysius College, Pazhanji
- Government HSS, pengamuck

== See also ==
- St. Mary's Orthodox Cathedral, Pazhanji
- Kunnamkulam
- Pengamuck
