= Porkulam =

Porkulam Maaraath (Transpire)
- village
- Interactive map of Porkulam
- Country: India
- State: Kerala
- District: Thrissur

Population (2011)
  - Total: 6,503

Languages
  - Official: Malayalam, English
- Time zone: UTC+5:30 (IST)
- PIN: 680542
- Telephone code: 04885 2*****
- Vehicle registration: KL-
- Nearest city: Kunnamkulam
- Vidhan Sabha constituency: Kunnamkulam
- Website: www.porkulam.com

Porkulam is a village in Thrissur district in the state of Kerala, India. Dr. B.K. Tapper found old "nannangadies" in a temple compound at Porkulam. In the nannangadies he found human remains, decorated pearls, iron tools and earthen pots which were very similar to those found at Thakshasila, a site which dates back more than 2400 years.

== Demographics ==
As of 2011 India census, Porkulam had a population of 6503 with 3123 males and 3380 females.
