= Kunnamkulam =

- Municipality
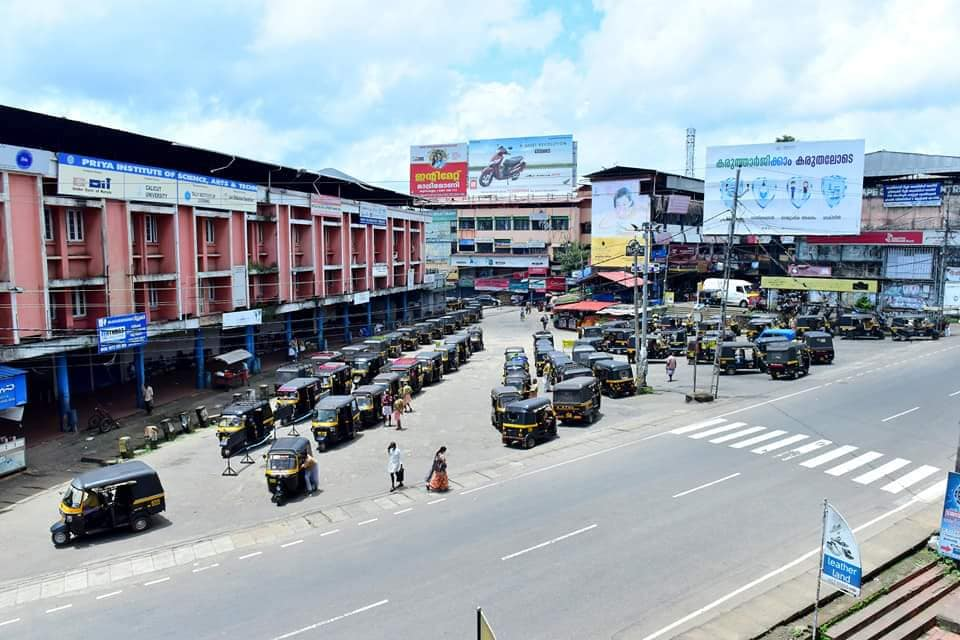
- Aerial view of Kunnamkulam old bus stand

- Location in Kerala, India Kunnamkulam (India)
- Coordinates: 10°39′2.885″N 76°4′9.492″E
- Country: India
- State: Kerala
- District: Thrissur
- Taluk: Kunnamkulam

Government
  - Type: Municipality
  - Body: Kunnamkulam Municipality
  - M.L.A: A. C. Moideen (CPI(M))

Area
  - Total: 34.18 km^{2} (13.20 sq mi)
- Elevation: 57 m (187 ft)

Population (2011)
  - Total: 54,071
  - Density: 1,582/km^{2} (4,097/sq mi)

Languages
  - Official: Malayalam, English
- Time zone: UTC+5:30 (IST)
- PIN: 680503
- STD code: 04885
- Vehicle registration: KL-46, KL-48
- State Assembly Constituency: Kunnamkulam
- Lok Sabha Constituency: Alathur
- Website: thrissur.nic.in/en/whoswho/kunnamkulam-municipality/

Kunnamkulam Malayalam: [kun̪ːəm kuɭ̺ːəm] is a municipal town located in the Thrissur District of Kerala, India, with historical origins tracing back to the Paleolithic age. It is located approximately 24 km (15 mi) northwest of district headquarters Thrissur, 92 km (57 mi) north of Kochi, 85 km (53 mi) east of Palakkad and 8 km (5.0 mi) northeast of the pilgrimage town of Guruvayur.

== History ==
The region around present-day Kunnamkulam has a rich and layered history that traces back to the Sangam period (circa 3rd century BCE to 4th century CE). During this era, the area was part of the ancient Mahodaya Pattanam under Chera dynasty's territory, which engaged in active trade with the Roman Empire and other civilizations of the time.

Historically, the town was part of the Punnathur chiefdom, one of the four royal branches of the Talappilli lineage, the others being Kakkad, Ainikkur, and Manakkulam. Kunnamkulam served as the administrative headquarters of the Talappilli Taluk (modern-day Thalapilly) until 1860.

The early cultural development of the region was influenced by the arrival of Syrian Christian communities, who established some of Kerala’s earliest churches and played a key role in shaping Kunnamkulam’s emerging identity. By the medieval period, Kunnamkulam had evolved into a significant settlement for the Nasrani (Syrian Christian) community.

In the late 18th century, during the reign of Shakthan Thampuran, the ruler of the Kingdom of Cochin, Kunnamkulam gained further strategic prominence. Shakthan Thampuran actively promoted trade and urban development across central Kerala and encouraged the settlement of Syrian Christians in commercial hubs such as Kunnamkulam, Thrissur, and Irinjalakuda. These policies contributed to the town’s growth as a vibrant commercial centre and a symbol of religious pluralism. Kunnamkulam came to be regarded as "the chief centre of Orthodox Christians in the state."

A notable demographic shift occurred in 1789, during the invasion of Tippu Sultan, Christian families from Chattukulangare migrated to Kunnamkulam. The Talappilli Rajas facilitated their resettlement by allocating land and permitting the construction of churches. These settlers established themselves along both sides of the town’s main street, significantly contributing to its commercial vibrancy and multicultural character.

During the colonial period, Kunnamkulam continued to thrive under both Portuguese and British influence. The Portuguese period witnessed increased foreign trade and closer ties with Christian communities. Under British rule, the town further expanded as a Christian-majority urban centre, noted for its distinct settlement pattern and its status as a well-organized commercial town.

== Demographics ==
As of 2011 Census, Kunnamkulam had a population of 54,071 with 25,392 males and 28,679 females. The municipality caters 13,156 households with an area of 34.18 km^{2} (13.20 sq mi). 9.3% of the population was under 6 years of age. Literacy rate of Kunnamkulam city is 96.84% higher than state average of 94.00%. In Kunnamkulam, Male literacy is around 97.71% while female literacy rate is 96.08%.

Kunnamkulam religious data(2011)
Community	Percent
Hinduism	62.06%
Christianity	28.87%
Islam	8.86%

== Etymology ==
The name Kunnamkulam is derived from the Malayalam language, reflecting the town's geographical and cultural characteristics. It is a compound word made up of two parts:

- "Kunnu" (കുന്ന്): Meaning "hill" or "elevated land."
- "Kulam" (കുളം): Meaning "pond" or "waterbody."

Thus, Kunnamkulam translates to "a pond at the foot of a hill" or "a waterbody near elevated land." The name likely refers to the natural features of the region, particularly the presence of small hillocks and waterbodies like ponds or streams. Historical records suggest that the name has been in use for centuries, reflecting the town's identity as a settlement surrounded by fertile land and abundant water resources.

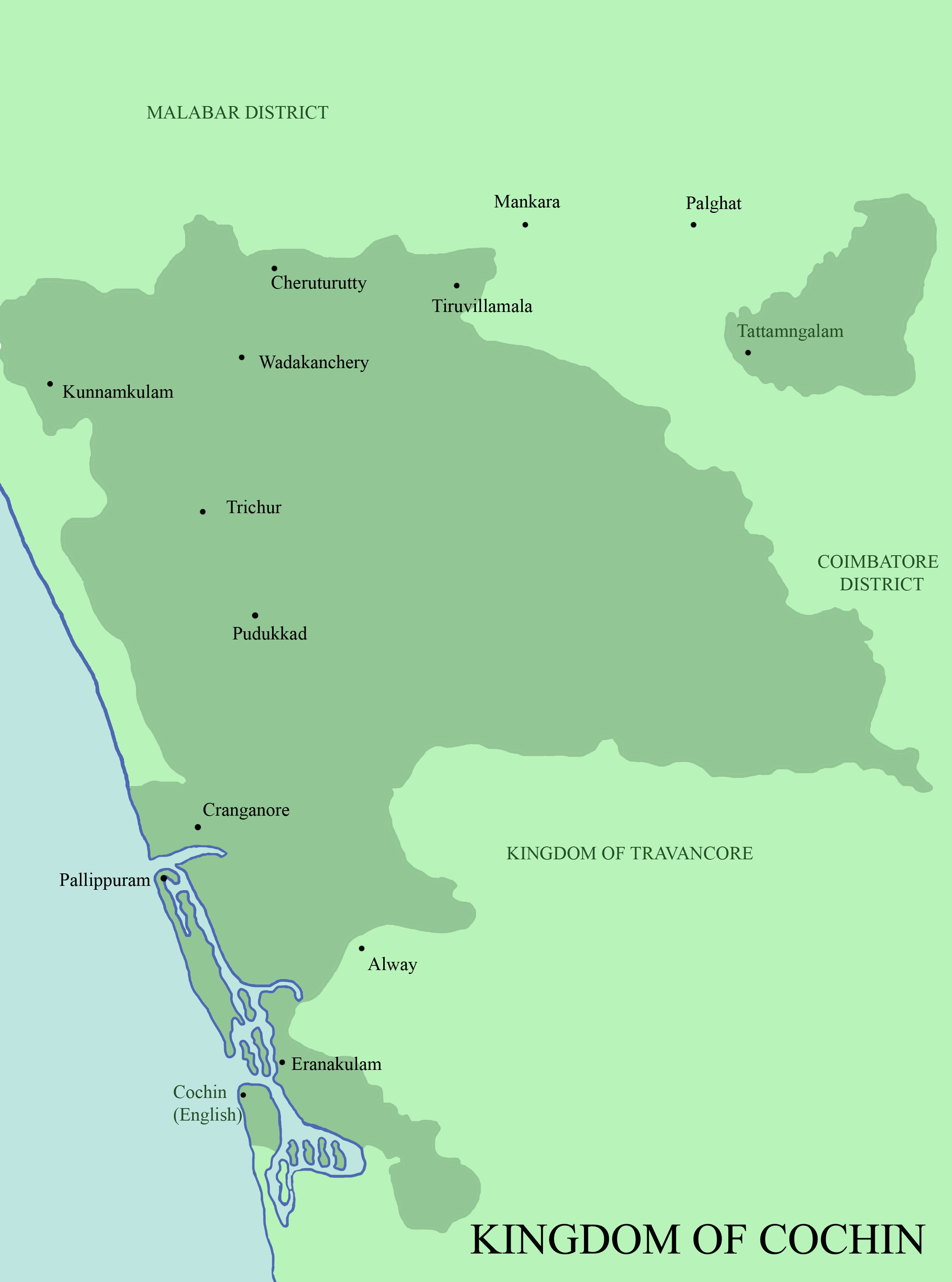
A map showing Kunnamkulam as part of the Kingdom of Cochin.

A cyber campaign was started that resulted in the changing of the often-misspelt name കുന്ദംകുളം (Kundhamkulam), to കുന്നംകുളം (Kunnamkulam). Apparently the wrong spelling "കുന്ദംകുളം (Kundhamkulam)" was being used for the city name on the buses, sign boards, publications, etc,. This issue was brought into the social media, where people unanimously opined to correct the spelling to "കുന്നംകുളം (Kunnamkulam)." The issue was eventually brought before the Kunnamkulam Municipal Council, which passed a resolution mandating the use of "Kunnamkulam" in all official and public contexts, effectively ending the use of the incorrect spelling.

== Geography ==
Geographically, Kunnamkulam lies at approximately at 10.65°N 76.08°E. having an area of 34.18 square kilometers. The topography of Kunnamkulam is characterized by gently undulating terrain with an average elevation of around 16 meters above sea level. The landscape features a mix of small hillocks and ponds, which is reflected in the town's name—Kunnam' meaning hill and Kulam. Notable hills in the region include Adupputty, Kizhoor, and Kakkad, while prominent ponds such as Enjhankulam, Ayyamkulam, and Madhurakulam are situated within the town's vicinity. The surrounding area within a 2-mile radius comprises approximately 40% cropland, 29% forested areas, and 24% shrubland, indicating a predominantly agrarian landscape interspersed with natural vegetation. This diverse land use contributes to the town's ecological richness and supports its agricultural activities.

== Government ==
=== Municipal administration ===
Established in 1948 as a Grade-IV municipality and had an area of 6.96 km^{2} (2.69 sq mi) with 16 electoral wards, Kunnamkulam Municipality has evolved significantly over the decades. In 2000, it was upgraded to a Grade-II municipality through the amalgamation of the full Arthat panchayat and parts of Porkulam and Chowwannur panchayats. This expansion increased the municipal area from 7 km² to its current extent 34.18 km^{2} (13.20 sq mi), encompassing 31 electoral wards. The municipality is responsible for local governance, including urban planning, infrastructure development, public health, and sanitation services.

=== Legislative representation ===
Politically, Kunnamkulam is designated as Constituency No. 62 in the Kerala Legislative Assembly. It is one of the seven assembly segments that form the Alathur Lok Sabha constituency. Earlier, it was part of the Ottapalam Constituency. The constituency has historically been a politically active region, with representation alternating between major political parties such as the Indian National Congress (INC), Communist Party of India (Marxist) (CPI(M)), and other regional alliances.

== Administration ==
=== Judicial First Class Magistrate Court ===
The Judicial First Class Magistrate Court in Kunnamkulam handles criminal cases within its jurisdiction, including areas like Kunnamkulam, Vadakkekad, and Peramangalam. The court complex also houses specialized courts, including:

- Family Court
- Fast Track Special Court(POCSO)

Several other important government offices that facilitate civic administration include:

- Municipality Office
- Sub Registrar Office
- Sub Treasury Office
- Thaluk Office/Mini Civil Station
- The Food Safety Officer Office

=== Police station ===
The Kunnamkulam Police Station serves as the principal law enforcement agency in the town. It operates under the Thrissur City Police, which is part of the Kerala Police. The Kunnamkulam Police Station's jurisdiction spans approximately 130 square kilometers, covering both urban and rural areas.

It includes 18 revenue villages: Arthat, Kunnamkulam, Anjoor, Karikkad, Perumpilavu, Pazhanji, Kattakampal, Porkulam, Mangad, Agathiyoor, Kanippayoor, Chemmanthitta, Kadavallur, Chowannur, Chiramanengad, Choondal, Eranellur, and parts of Chiranellur village. Additionally, it encompasses parts of the Choondal, Kadavallur, Porkulam, Kattakampal, Chowannur, and Kadangode panchayats, as well as the Kunnamkulam Municipality.

=== Community and cultural facilities ===
Kunnamkulam Municipality manages a range of public amenities that serve the town’s cultural and recreational needs, including:

- Municipal Town Hall
- Municipal Library and Reading Room
- Municipal Children’s Park

== Notable initiatives ==
=== Subhiksha project (Hunger-free town initiative) ===
In 2020, Kunnamkulam launched an effort to become Thrissur District's first hunger-free town under Kerala's Subhiksha Project. On February 28, 2020, a canteen was inaugurated to serve 500 meals daily at ₹20 each, with free meals for 10 individuals. Operated by Kudumbashree Mission, this initiative was praised by state ministers and highlighted Kunnamkulam's focus on food security.

=== Carbon neutrality goal ===
In 2022, Kunnamkulam embarked on a mission to achieve carbon-neutral status by 2030, inspired by Meenangadi, India's first carbon-neutral grama panchayat. A study by the College of Climate Change and Environmental Sciences at Kerala Agricultural University assessed carbon levels across 777 households in 37 wards. The municipality's action plan includes planting 38 lakh saplings, promoting solar energy, and encouraging electric vehicles.

=== Civic accountability and waste management ===
Kunnamkulam's health department gained attention in 2025 for its approach to tackling littering. In a reported incident, officials tracked a Bengaluru techie who dumped garbage near a veterinary hospital, returning the waste to his doorstep with a fine. This action was praised by Kerala's Local Self-Government Minister M.B. Rajesh for the municipality's proactive stance on public cleanliness and civic responsibility.

== Notable landmarks ==
Kunnamkulam is home to several landmarks that reflect its rich cultural heritage, historical significance, and communal harmony. These sites attract visitors and serve as important centres for local communities.

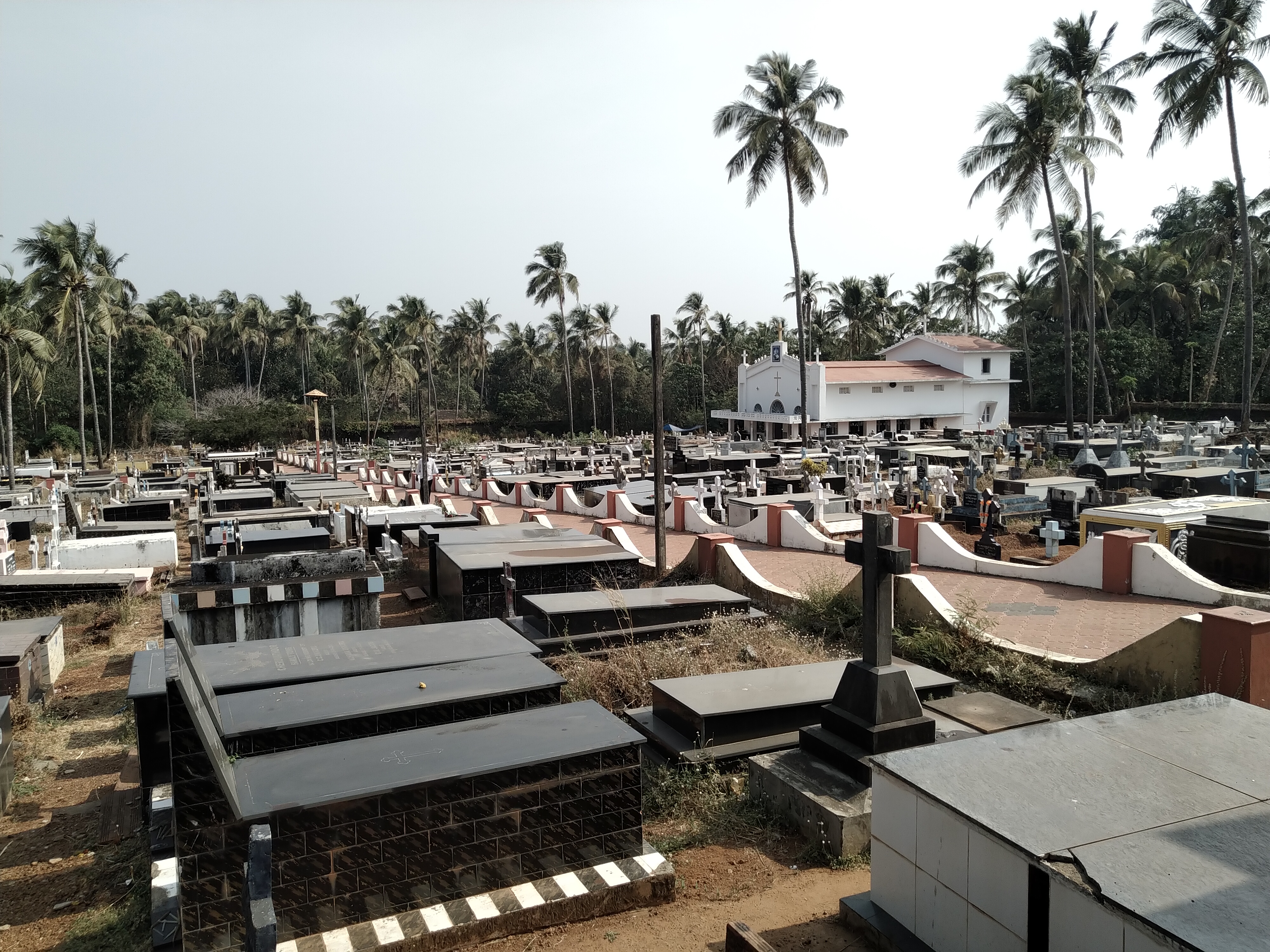
The largest cemetery in Kerala, Arthat St. Mary's Orthodox Cathedral

=== Arthat St. Mary's Orthodox Cathedral (Arthat Valiyapally) ===
Situated in Arthat, approximately one mile south of Kunnamkulam, this cathedral is among the oldest Christian churches in India. Believed to have been established by St. Thomas the Apostle in AD 52, Arthat Valiyapally has played a pivotal role in the spiritual life of the Malankara Orthodox Syrian Church. The church underwent reconstruction between 1805 and 1827 after being damaged during Tipu Sultan's invasion. The church has the largest cemetery in Kerala, spanning approximately 4.5 acres of land.

=== St. Matthias' Orthodox Church (Ambala Palli), South Bazar ===
Commonly referred to as "Ambala Palli"—a name derived from the Malayalam words ambalam (temple) and palli (church)—St. Matthias’ Church is a prominent and historically significant Christian place of worship located in the heart of South Bazar, north of the Anjoor-Kunnamkulam road and west of the Guruvayoor-Kunnamkulam road. The church has a distinctive appearance that uniquely blends Hindu temple architecture with Christian liturgical function.

=== Thalakkottukara Shiva Temple ===
Located in Kunnamkulam town, the temple is notable for housing two sanctums within the same 'Chuttambalam' (enclosed temple courtyard), a feature that underscores its architectural uniqueness. One sanctum enshrines a Swayambhu(self-manifested) Shiva idol, while the other contains a consecrated Shiva linga. Both deities are worshipped by the same priest, reflecting a unique aspect of ritual practice. Major festivals celebrated here include Thiruvathira, Shivaratri, and Prathishta Dinam (the temple's consecration day), drawing devotees from various regions. The temple is administered by Guruvayur Devaswom Board.

=== Cheruvathur Mahadeva Temple ===
Cheruvathur Mahadeva Temple has numerous legends connecting to its popularity and one of the ancient temples in Kerala. Traditionally believed to have been consecrated by sage Parashurama, the temple is a part of the 108 Shiva Temples.

=== YMCA Kunnamkulam ===
The YMCA Kunnamkulam is one of the oldest and most historically significant institutions in the town. Located on YMCA Road, Chiralayam, the campus spans approximately 2 acres, featuring community facilities including a basketball court, classrooms, and a multipurpose hall. the institution has played a prominent role in the region’s social, educational, and spiritual life for over a century. The foundation stone of the current YMCA building was laid in 1919 by G. Sherwood Eddy, wife of one of the National Secretaries of the YMCA of India and the property was officially transferred under the ownership of the National Council of YMCAs of India.

== Culture ==
Kerala Kalamandalam was inaugurated in November 1930 at the residence of Kakkad Karanavappad in Kunnamkulam, and was, six months later shifted to Ambalapuram near Mulakunnathukavu before eventually moved onto the village of Cheruthuruthy, just south of Shoranur, in 1936.

=== Printing industry ===
Kunnamkulam is renowned for its vibrant printing industry, which has played a pivotal role in shaping the town's cultural and economic identity. Often referred to as the "Printing Hub of Kerala," the town is home to numerous printing presses, bookbinding units, and publishing houses that have contributed significantly to Kerala's literary and educational landscape. The origins of Kunnamkulam's printing industry can be traced back to the late 19th and early 20th centuries, when the town emerged as a centre for Christian missionary activities. The establishment of churches, schools, and seminaries created a demand for religious texts, educational materials, and literature, which spurred the growth of local printing presses.

The establishment of the Vidyarathnaprabha Press in 1860 marked the inception of organized printing in Kunnamkulam. This press became instrumental in publishing significant Malayalam literary works, including corrected editions of classic texts like Adhyatma Ramayanam. Notably, scholars such as Kaikulangara Rama Variar were associated with this press, contributing to its reputation as a hub for scholarly publications.

Following this, the A.R.P. Press, further enriched the town's publishing landscape. In 1894, this press launched the newspaper Aathmaposhini, which featured contributions from eminent personalities like Mahakavi Vallathol and Desabhimani Ramakrishna Pillai. In 1929, Kanippayyur Shankaran Namboodiripad established the Panchangam Press in Kunnamkulam, primarily to publish almanacs and texts related to traditional Indian knowledge systems, including Vedas, Upanishads, and classical Sanskrit literature. This initiative further solidified the town's status as a centre for cultural and scholarly publishing.

=== Line houses (angadi pura or veeducal) ===
The 'Line Houses' (angadi pura or veeducal) are typically constructed on narrow plots ranging from 3 to 5 cents (approximately 120 to 200 square meters) along both sides of the street around various bazaars or angadis (streets)—North (Vadakke Angadi), South (Thekke Angadi), East (Kizhakke Angadi), and West (Padinjare Angadi)—centred around a junction known as Nadupanthi ("Middle Point"). Each building features a shopfront facing the street, facilitating commercial activities, while the rear portion serves as the family's living quarters. Many of these houses also include a backyard, historically used for processing agricultural products.The design facilitated a seamless integration of business and domestic life, enabling merchants (mostly Syrian Christian community) to operate their shops while residing in the same premises. The streets lined with these houses are notably narrow, creating a dense urban fabric that fosters close-knit community interactions. This layout is similar to the traditional Agraharams (Brahmin quarters) and Jew Streets found in other parts of Kerala, indicating a confluence of cultural influences in Kunnamkulam's urban planning.

=== Onathallu ===
Onathallu, also known as Kayyankali or Avittathallu, is a traditional martial art and semi-contact combat sport performed in Kunnamkulam during the Onam festival and has been held in Kunnamkulam since the time of Samoothiri. Rooted in Kerala's Kalaripayattu tradition, the performance involves pairs of participants engaging in choreographed combat within a 14-meter diameter circle. Combatants use open-palm strikes and blocks, adhering to specific rules that prohibit punching, kicking, or stepping outside the circle.

In the early 1990s, a Kunnamkulam-based arts and sports club, Sangham reinvented Onathallu and organized it in their own way. Held every year at the Jawahar Basketball Stadium (now an indoor stadium), Kunnamkulam’s Onathallu events attract participants and spectators from various parts of the state, contributing to the preservation of this cultural practice.

== Healthcare ==
- Government Taluk Hospital—Established in 1888 as Govt. Hospital and later upgraded to Govt. Taluk Hospital, this hospital is situated near the police station in Kunnamkulam and offers medical services to patients from the Municipality area and also to nearby Panchayaths. The Hospital has facility of 124 working bed strength and with 24 X 7 Casualty services with an average of 1110 patients availing treatment per day. Hospital is being selected for Ardram program and scaling to the next extent.
- Government Homeo Dispensary — A public healthcare facility that provides homoeopathic treatment to the residents of the town and surrounding areas. The dispensary is part of Kerala's extensive network of government-run homoeopathic institutions, managed by the Department of Homoeopathy, Government of Kerala.

Kunnamkulam also has several private hospitals and clinics known for advanced medical care and specialized services. These hospitals complement the government healthcare system, providing high-quality medical care to the town’s residents. Prominent facilities include: Unity Hospital, Malankara Hospital, Daya Royal Hospital, etc,.

- Government Veterinary Polyclinic—The Govt. Veterinary Polyclinic in Kunnamkulam, comes under The Directorate of Animal Husbandry. Kerala. The clinic is located near to the Kunnamkulam market on Kozhikode road. It is part of the District Animal Husbandry Office, which also has artificial insemination centres and other veterinary services.

== Education ==
=== Government Schools ===
- Government Model Boys Higher Secondary School—Situated in Kunnamkulam–Thrissur Road, opposite to the Police Station, Govt. Model B. H. S. S. is one of the oldest public educational institutions in the town, this school provides secondary and higher secondary education for male students and is managed by the District Administration.
- Government Model Girls Higher Secondary School—Located on the Kunnamkulam–Guruvayur Road, Govt. Model G. H. S. S.is one of the prominent public educational institutions for girls in the region. The school offers both secondary and higher secondary education, and is managed by the District Administration. It has played a key role in promoting academic excellence and the empowerment of young women in the region.

Special Schools

- Government School for the Blind—This co-educational residential school caters to visually impaired students from grades 1 to 7 and is managed by the Department of Education.
- Government Vocational Higher Secondary School for Deaf—Established in 1936, this institution offers vocational higher secondary education to hearing-impaired students and is overseen by the Department of Education.

=== Colleges ===
- Government Polytechnic College—Previously, this institute was a Government Technical High School and was upgraded to Polytechnic College in the year 1994, under the Directorate of Technical Education, Kerala. This AICTE -approved institution is situated in 12.5 acres compound in Kizhoor and offers diploma courses in engineering and technology disciplines.
- Sree Vivekananda College—Established on September 30, 1981, by the Cochin Devaswom Board, the college began with pre-degree courses and was upgraded to a degree college in 1991.This institution is a government-aided institution affiliated with the University of Calicut.

In addition, the town’s private schools and colleges play a significant role in complementing the government educational system, offering high-quality education and specialized programs to students from Kunnamkulam and surrounding areas. Other prominent facilities include:

- M.D (Mar Dionysius) College
- Bethania Institute of Management Studies
- Good Shepherd CMI School
- Bethany St.John's English HSS
- MJD High School

=== ASAP Community Skill Park ===
The Additional Skill Acquisition Programme (ASAP) Community Skill Park in Kunnamkulam is a government-run initiative aimed at equipping youth with industry-relevant skills and vocational training. Operated under the Government of Kerala’s Department of Higher Education, the center offers training in areas such as IT, healthcare, electronics, and hospitality. It is part of a broader state-wide effort to enhance employability among students and job seekers by providing access to certified courses, expert trainers, and modern infrastructure. Spread over a spacious campus with modern labs, the facility integrates eco-friendly features like rainwater harvesting, solar power, and advanced waste management.

== Sport ==
=== Government Higher Secondary School (GHSS) Ground ===
Renovated at a cost of ₹5.08 crore and inaugurated on September 28, 2020, by Chief Minister Pinarayi Vijayan, the GHSS Ground, commonly known as the Senior Ground, is a key venue for sports and community events in the region. Funded by the Directorate of Sports and Youth Affairs (DSYA), the upgraded facility features a natural football turf, a spectator gallery, and a compound wall, with a synthetic track under the Khelo India project. Designed to host major sporting events, including potential national-level competitions, the facility serves both the school and the wider community, hosting events like the state school sports festival. The facility is maintained by a committee comprising representatives from the DSYA, Kunnamkulam municipality, and the school, ensuring regular upkeep, including turf watering and long-term maintenance.

=== Jawahar Basketball Stadium ===
The Jawahar Basketball Stadium, located near MO Road in Kunnamkulam is an indoor sports facility primarily used for basketball. Situated close to the Kunnamkulam Police Station and Municipality Office, it serves as a community venue for sports activities, including local tournaments. Originally known for basketball, the stadium has been adapted as an indoor arena, hosting cultural activities and training sessions, including the traditional Onathallu, a semi-contact combat sport performed during the Onam festival.

== Transport ==
=== Road ===
State Highway 69 (Thrissur- Kuttippuram) and State Highway 50 (Wadakkaanchery - Chavakkad) intersect at the centre of Kunnamkulam town, at Parayil Centre. Additionally, State Highway 39 intersects with SH 69 near Perumpilavu, north of Kunnamkulam.

=== Kunnamkulam bus stand ===
The Kunnamkulam New Bus Stand, inaugurated in 2020, is a significant addition to the town's transportation infrastructure. Located on Town Hall - Herbert Road, it serves as a central hub for both private and public bus services, enhancing connectivity within the Thrissur district and neighbouring regions. The bus stand includes passenger amenities such as waiting areas, refreshment kiosks, and designated drop-off zones. Additionally, it houses a shopping complex, a commercial space aimed at boosting local commerce and providing convenience to travelers. Despite its inauguration, the bus stand's full-scale operations were delayed due to pending interior work within the shopping complex and challenges posed by the COVID-19 pandemic.

=== Rail ===
The nearest railway station is Guruvayur railway station, approximately 8 km (5.0 mi) away, which connects Kunnamkulam to cities like Thrissur, Ernakulam, Trivandrum, Chennai and Madurai via the Southern Railway network. For more extensive rail connectivity, Thrissur railway station, approximately 24 km (15 mi) away, is a major railhead with trains to destinations across India.

=== Air ===
The closest international airport is Cochin International Airport (COK) at Nedumbassery, approximately 78 km from Kunnamkulam. This airport offers domestic and international flights, making it the primary gateway for air travelers. Calicut International Airport (CCJ), about 80 km away, is another viable option for air travel. Both airports are accessible via SH, with taxi services and private vehicles providing transport to and from Kunnamkulam.

== In popular culture ==
=== "Town of duplicates" label ===
The label "Town of Duplicates" associated with Kunnamkulam is often considered a humorous or outdated stereotype rather than an accurate reflection of the town's economic activities. The term likely emerged from anecdotal accounts and local folklore regarding Kunnamkulam’s once-flourishing printing industry, which was reputed to produce imitations of popular publications and goods. There are no authoritative records or legal findings confirming Kunnamkulam as a major centre for counterfeiting or illegal duplication. Instead, the stereotype appears to have been perpetuated through Kerala’s rich oral storytelling traditions.

=== "Kunnamkulam Map" terminology ===
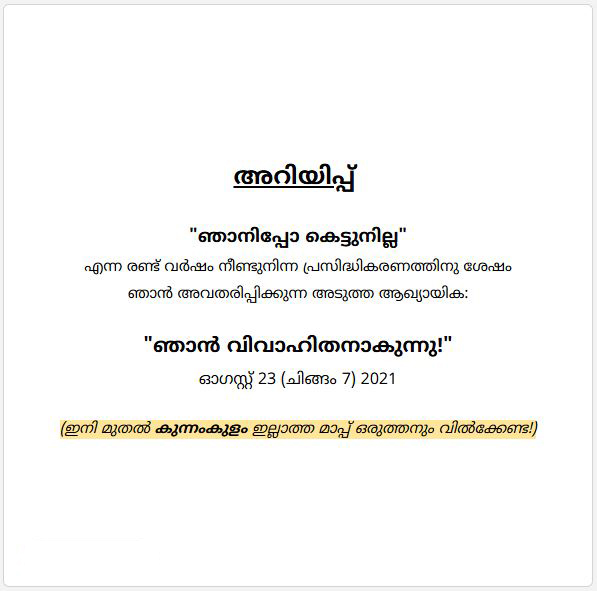
A digital wedding invitation in Malayalam that humorously states (highlighted in yellow)—"From now onwards, nobody shall sell a map without Kunnamkulam on it!"

The phrase "Kunnamkulam map" originates from a comedic scene in the 1994 Malayalam film Manathe Kottaram. In the scene, a street vendor calls out "maap, maap" (Malayalam for "map") while selling maps, but an elderly woman, portrayed by actress Philomena, misinterprets the call as "maapu" (meaning "apology" in Malayalam). This misunderstanding leads to a humorous confrontation when the woman demands to know why the vendor is apologizing. When the vendor shows her a map of North America, her confusion deepens upon realizing that her hometown, Kunnamkulam, is not featured on it, resulting in a comical altercation. The scene gained widespread popularity among Malayalam film enthusiasts, and the "Kunnamkulam map" became a cultural anecdote in Kerala, symbolizing clever wordplay and the region’s fondness for humor based on linguistic nuances.

In July 2016, the term reentered public discourse when Kozhikode District Collector Prasanth Nair humorously referenced it during a social media exchange with Congress MP M.K. Raghavan. Following a dispute over delays in clearing contractor bills under the MPLADS program, Raghavan demanded a public "maapu" (apology) from Nair. In response, Nair posted an image of a "Kunnamkulam map" on Facebook, playfully drawing on the linguistic pun popularized by Manathe Kottaram. The post quickly went viral, resonating with Keralites familiar with the original film reference.

== Climate ==
In terms of climate, Kunnamkulam experiences a tropical savanna climate, characterized by distinct wet and dry seasons. The hot season extends from February to May, with April being the warmest month, averaging highs of 33.3°C (92°F) and lows of 26.7°C (80°F). The cooler season spans from June to September, with July being the coolest month, featuring average highs of 28.9°C (84°F) and lows of 24.4°C (76°F). The town receives substantial rainfall during the monsoon months, contributing to its lush greenery and agricultural productivity.

Climate data for Kunnamkulam, Kerala
Month	Jan	Feb	Mar	Apr	May	Jun	Jul	Aug	Sep	Oct	Nov	Dec	Year
Mean daily maximum °C (°F)	32.9 (91.2)	34 (93)	34 (93)	32.2 (90.0)	30.4 (86.7)	28.1 (82.6)	27.6 (81.7)	27.7 (81.9)	28.5 (83.3)	29.1 (84.4)	29.9 (85.8)	31.2 (88.2)	30.5 (86.8)
Mean daily minimum °C (°F)	23.1 (73.6)	23.9 (75.0)	25.3 (77.5)	25.7 (78.3)	25.3 (77.5)	24.2 (75.6)	23.8 (74.8)	23.7 (74.7)	23.7 (74.7)	23.6 (74.5)	23.3 (73.9)	23.1 (73.6)	24.1 (75.3)
Average precipitation mm (inches)	8 (0.3)	13 (0.5)	53 (2.1)	161 (6.3)	300 (11.8)	535 (21.1)	527 (20.7)	390 (15.4)	252 (9.9)	288 (11.3)	139 (5.5)	30 (1.2)	2,696 (106.1)
Source: Climate-Data.org

== Archaeology ==
- Roman coins of Eyyal: Archaeologists have unearthed a collection of old Roman coins at Eyyal. These coins date from 123 BC to 117 AD. They are currently exhibited in the Archeological Museum of Thrissur.
- Chowannur and Kakkad Burial Caves: The Chowannur Burial Cave is a prominent prehistoric megalithic rock-cut cave located in Chowannur. The cave features a single entry that leads into a circular chamber, which is the sole chamber within the structure. Also The Kakkad Burial Cave, situated near Kunnamkulam town, is an archaeological site that provides evidence of human habitation dating back to the Paleolithic age. Both the Chowannur Burial Cave and the Kakkad Burial Cave are recognized as centrally protected monuments under the jurisdiction of the Archaeological Survey of India (ASI).

== Notable people ==
=== Politics ===
- C. P. John – Indian politician and former MLA
- Babu M. Palissery – Indian politician
- K. P. Viswanathan – Indian politician

=== Arts and cinema ===
- P. A. Backer – Indian film director
- Antony Eastman – Indian film director
- Rahul R. Sarma – Indian film director
- V. K. Sreeraman – Indian actor

=== Literature ===
- B. K. Harinarayanan – Indian lyricist and film director
- Joe Paul – Indian lyricist and music composer
- T. D. Ramakrishnan – Indian novelist and translator
- C. V. Sreeraman – Indian writer

=== Religion ===
- Cyril Baselios I – Metropolitan of the Malabar Independent Syrian Church
- Pulikkottil Dionysius II - Malankara Metropolitan
- Dionysious V- Malankara Metropolitan
- Kanippayyur Shankaran Namboodiripad
- Osthathios Pathros - Metropolitan of Syriac Orthodox Church
- Baselios Marthoma Paulose II - Catholicos of the East and Malankara Metropolitan
- Geevarghese Mar Philoxenos II – Metropolitan of the Malabar Independent Syrian Church
- Geevarghese Yulios - Metropolitan of Malankara Orthodox Syrian Church

== See also ==
- Places of worship in Kunnamkulam
- Pazhanji
- Pengamuck
- Pazhanji Church
- West Mangad
