= Bangalore Orthodox Diocese =

Diocese of Bangalore

Orthodox
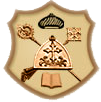
- Catholicate Emblem

Location
- Country: India
- Territory: Bangalore, Andhra Pradesh and Telangana
- Metropolitan: H. G. Geevarghese Mar Philoxenos(Asst.)
- Headquarters: Bishop's House, No. 1, Malankara DV, Behind Sharma Farm House, Doddagubi, Bangalore-560 077

Information
- First holder: Baselios Marthoma Didymos I
- Rite: Malankara Rite
- Established: 2009
- Diocese: Bangalore Diocese
- Parent church: Malankara Orthodox Syrian Church

Website
- Bangalore Diocese

Bangalore Diocese is one of the 32 diocese of the Malankara Orthodox Syrian Church also known as Indian Orthodox Church located in Bangalore, Karnataka.

== History ==
The diocese came into existence from 1 April 2009 from the Madras Diocese. The Diocese was administered by the Catholicose and assisted by H.G. Abraham Mar Epiphanios, Metropolitan of Sultan Battery Diocese as the Assistant Metropolitan of Bangalore Diocese. H.G. Dr. Abraham Mar Seraphim is the first Metropolitan of the Bangalore Diocese who took in-charge on 15–08–2010.

The area covered by the diocese include the state of Karnataka, Andhra Pradesh and 3 parishes from Gulf. The Diocese has two Mission Projects one at Eluru in Andhra Pradesh and one at Bilikere in Karnataka

== Metropolitans ==
Metropolitans:

- H.H Baselios Marthoma Didymos 1 (2009–2010)
- H.G Puthenveettil Dr. Abraham Mar Seraphim (2010–2023)

Assistant Metropolitans:

- H.G Vattamparambil Dr. Abraham Mar Epiphanios (2009–2010)
- H. G. Geevarghese Mar Philoxenos (2023–present)

== List of parishes ==
=== Karnataka ===
- St. Gregorios Orthodox Cathedral, Bangalore
- St. George Orthodox Church (Georgian Pilgrim Center) Indiranagar 2nd Stage, Bangalore
- Mar Yuhanon Mamdana Orthodox Church, Krishna Rajapuram, Bangalore
- St. Thomas Orthodox Church, Banasawadi, Bangalore
- Mar Gregorios Orthodox Church, Hebbal, Bangalore
- St. Dionysius Orthodox Church, Dasarahalli, Bangalore
- St. Baselios Orthodox Church, Marthahalli, Bangalore
- St. Stephen's Orthodox Church, Vijayanagar, Bangalore
- St. Gregorios Orthodox Church, Mathikere, Bangalore
- St. Mary's Orthodox Valiyapally, Gangamma Circle, Jalahalli, Bangalore
- St. Mary's Orthodox Church, Begur, Bangalore
- Holy Trinity Orthodox Church, Sarjapur Road
- St. Gregorios Orthodox Church, Nazarbad, Mysore
- St. Gregorios Orthodox Church, Tumkur

=== Andhra Pradesh and Telangana ===
- St. Gregorios Orthodox Cathedral, Hyderabad
- St. George Orthodox Church, Jeedimetla, Hyderabad
- St. Mary's Orthodox Church, Ramachandrapuram, Hyderabad
- St. Andrew's Valiyapally Orthodox Church, West Marredpally, Secunderabad
- St. George Orthodox Church, West Godavari, Vijayawada
- St. Stephen's Orthodox Church, Vishakapattanam
- St. Thomas Fellowship, Hitech City

=== UAE ===
- St. Gregorios Orthodox Church, Fujarigh
- St. Gregorios Orthodox Congregation, Dibba
- St. Mary's Orthodox Church, Ras-Al-Khaima
