= List of Malankara metropolitans =

Malankara Metropolitan is a title formerly given to the head of the Malankara Church by the Government of Travancore and the Kingdom of Cochin in South India. Malankara Metropolitan is the temporal head of the Malankara Church and is elected by the Malankara Association, the chief administrative body of the Malankara Nasrani Community.

The Malankara Metropolitan is the head of the Malankara Church. Due to schisms in the Malankara Church, there are three distinct lines of Malankara Metropolitan.

The head of the Malankara Orthodox Syrian Church is known as the Malankara Metropolitan, and it was recognized by the Supreme Court of India as the Malankara Metropolitan in the verdict pertaining to the asset dispute with the Malankara Jacobite Syrian Church. Baselios Marthoma Mathews III became Malankara Metropolitan in 2021.

The administrative head of the Malankara Jacobite Syrian Church is known as the Malankara Metropolitan. Mor Baselios Joseph has been Malankara Metropolitan since 2019.

The Malankara Mar Thoma Syrian Church primate of the church uses the title "Mar Thoma Metropolitan" since 1894. As of 2022 Mar Thoma Metropolitan was Theodosius Mar Thoma.

== List of Malankara Metropolitans(1653-1865) ==
This is the list of Church heads of the Malankara Church after Coonan Cross Oath:

- Mar Thoma I (1653–1670). Four months after the Coonan Cross Oath, on 22 May 1653, Thoma Kathanar (Archdecon Thomas) of Pakalomatom Family was consecrated as Bishop with the title "Mar Thoma" by 12 priests, with the permission of Syriac Orthodox Patriarch of Antioch Ignatius Ahatullah. He is known as 'Mar Thoma I' or 'Valiya Mar Thoma' (Mar Thoma the Great). The rival Catholic faction argued that consecration of Mar Thoma I by 12 priests was canonically irregular and so the Malankara church sent appeals to various Eastern Christian centers. Mor Gregorios Abdul Jaleel of Jerusalem, the Patriarchal Delegate reached Malankara in 1665 and regularized the consecration of Mar Thoma I, who had survived a number of assassination attempts. He died on 25 April 1670 and was interred at St Mary's Church, Angamaly.
- Mar Thoma II (1670–1686). Consecrated by Mar Thoma I and Mor Gregorios Abdul Jaleel. Died on 14 April 1686 and was interred at St. Mary's Church, Niranam.
- Mar Thoma III (1686–1688). Consecrated by Mar Ivanios Hidyathulla, the Patriarchal Delegate. Died on 21 April 1688 and was interred at St. Thomas Church, Kadampanad.
- Mar Thoma IV (1688–1728). Consecrated by Mar Ivanios Hidyathulla. Died on 24 March 1728 and was interred at St. Mary's Church, Kandanad.
- Mar Thoma V (1728–1765). Consecrated by Mar Thoma IV. Died on 8 May 1765 and was interred at St. Mary's Church, Niranam.
- Mar Thoma VI (Mar Dionysius I) (1765–1808). Consecrated by Mar Gregorios(Patriarchal Delegate). In June 1770, he accepted reconsecration from Antiochian bishops in order to avoid a split in the Church and the title Dionysius was accepted. Marthoma VI did not approve the appointment of Kattumangattu Abraham Mar Coorilos as a bishop by a Patriarchal Delegate. This was the beginning of Malabar Independent Syrian Church. Claudius Buchanan visited Mar Thoma VI and made arrangement for the translation of the Bible into Malayalam. Mar Thoma VI presented him the Peshitto Bible written in the old Syriac. This manuscript is kept in the public library of the University of Cambridge. Mar Thoma VI died on 8 April 1808 and was interred at St. Mary's Church, Puthencavu.
- Mar Thoma VII (1808–1809) Consecrated by Mar Thoma VI in 1796. During his time on 1 December 1808, a sum of 3000 Star Pagoda (in 2002 one Star Pagoda coin had a market value of £475) was given as loan in perpetuity to the British resident Colonel Macaulay. This is known as Vattipanam. Marthoma VII died on 4 July 1809 and was interred at St. Peter and St. Paul's Church, Kolenchery.
- Mar Thoma VIII (1809–1816). Consecrated on 2 July 1809 by Marthoma VII. During his time Kottayam Suriyani Seminary (later known as Pazhaya Seminary) was opened and modern education began in Kerala. Marthoma VIII died on 26 January 1816 and was interred at St. Mary's Church, Puthencavu
- Mar Thoma IX (1816–1817). Consecrated by Marthoma VIII, he retired to his home parish St. George's Church, Kadamattom. He died in 1817 and was interred at Kadamattom Church.
- Mar Dionysius II (Pulikottil Joseph Mar Dionysius I) (1816-1816). Born as Joseph Ittoop in Pulikkottil family in Kunnamkulam in 1742 and was ordained as bishop with title Joseph Mar Dionysius by Geevarghese Mar Philoxenos II of Thozhiyur Church on 22 March 1815. After the death of Mar Thoma VIII, who ordained his uncle Iype Kathanar as Mar Thoma IX was forced to abdicate his position and hand over charge to Joseph Mar Dionysius as he was made the supreme head of the Malankara Church by a Royal proclamation issued by the ruler of Travancore and later by the ruler of Cochin. From the time of Joseph Mar Dionysius, the title of Malankara Church head is known as Malankara Metropolitan. As he was the second Bishop with the name Dionysius in Malankara Church, he is also known as Mar Dionysius II. He died on 24 November 1816 and was interred at Pazhaya Seminary, Kottayam. The validity of his episcopal consecration is debated.
  - Mar Philoxenos II (1816–1817) - Geevarghese Mar Philoxenos II Metropolitan of Thozhiyoor and acting malankara metropolitan for two times
- Mar Dionysius III (Punnathra Mar Dionysius) (1817–1825). Born as Kurien in Punnathara family in Kottayam in 1785 and ordained as bishop by Geevarghese Mar Philoxenos II of Thozhiyur Church on 19 October 1817. He was pressurised by Angilican missionaries who wanted to reform the Malankara Church. He had to appoint a six-member committee to suggest improvements to be made in the church. He died on 17 May 1825 and was interred at St. Mary's Cheriapally, Kottayam. The validity of his episcopal consecration is debated
- Mar Dionysius IV (Cheppattu Philipose Mar Dionysius) (1825–1852). Born as Philipose in Aanjilimootil family in Pallippad near Cheppad in 1781 and was consecrated by Geevarghese Mar Philoxenos II of Thozhiyur Church on 27 August 1825. He had to face many obstacles during his reign. The C.M.S missionaries who came from England and their and the Anglican bishop of Calcutta began to interfere in the internal affairs of the Malankara Church. A letter from the bishop of Calcutta in 1835 suggested some changes in administration and liturgical practices of Malankara Church. Dionysius IV convened a meeting of the representatives of the parishes at Mavelikara on 16 January 1836 and rejected the suggestions of the Anglican Bishop. The meeting at Mavelikara gave official recognition to the Patriarch of Antioch as the Supremacy Administration of the Malankara Church. Hence, it was at this time Malankara Church came to be referred to as Jacobite Church. Soon the C.M.S. missionaries formed the C.M.S. Church and a minority of Malankara Church members joined in C.M.S. Church. The validity of his episcopal consecration is debated
  Even after Malankara Church ended its relationship with C.M.S. missionaries, the teaching of the missionaries influenced a group of church members. Some clergies under the leadership of Palakkunnath Abraham Malpan urged for a reformation in the Church. Abraham Malpan send his nephew Palakunnathu Deacon Mathews to Antioch. He was consecrated as bishop with the title Mathews Mar Athanasius by Patriarch of Antioch, Ignatius Elias II on 17 February 1842. He was the first bishop in Malankara ordained by Patriarch of Antioch. After about a year, in March 1843 Athanasius returned to India. There were objections from among the Malankara Church, due to his reformist tendencies. They later wrote to Antioch their objections and hence in 1846 the Patriarch of Antioch sent a Metropolitan Mor Kurilos Yuyakkim to Malankara as his delegate. In 1852 Dionysius IV abdicated due to poor health. Both Mor Kurilos Yuyakkim and Mathews Mar Athanasius made the claims for the Malankara Metropolitan title. The King of Travancore appointed a committee of four senior government officers and they decided that a foreign bishop could not be regarded as the Malankara Metropolitan. So the king issued a proclamation in favour of Mathews Mar Athanasius on 30 August 1852. After abdicating, Dionysius IV was bedridden due to ill health and died on 9 October 1855 and was interred at St. George Church, Cheppad
- Mathews Mar Athanasius (1852–1865). During the reign of Mathews Mar Athanasius reformation of the Church gained a momentum. However, the large majority of the people were traditionalist and the reformist party was a small minority. Traditionalist party sent Fr.Joseph (Ouseph Kathanar) of Pulikkottil family to Antioch. He was the nephew of Pulikkottil Joseph Mar Dionysious I (Mar Dionysius II). He was consecrated as Joseph Mar Dionysius II (Mar Dionysius V) by Patriarch of Antioch Ignatius Yakoob II on 7 May 1865.
  After reaching Malankara, Mar Dionysius V had requested to the Government of Travancore, for revoking the Royal Proclamation, issued earlier in favour of Mathews Mar Athanasius. But this appeal was rejected by Government and asked Mar Dionysius V to approach the Royal Court. Mathews Mar Athanasius consecrated elder son of Abraham Malpan with title Thomas Mar Athanasius as his successor in 1869. Mathews Mar Athanasius died on 16 July 1877 and was interred at Maramon Church. Litigation between the Traditionalist and Reformist factions continued until 12 July 1889, when Thomas Mar Athanasius was excluded from the office by the Royal Court of Travancore, which instead declared Mar Dionysius V (Pulikkottil Joseph Mar Dionysious II) as the rightful Malankara Metropolitan. The Reformist faction organized itself as the Oriental Protestant Malankara Mar Thoma Syrian Church, which persists to this day.
- Mar Dionysius V (Pulikkottil Joseph Mar Dionysius II) (1865–1909) Consecrated by Mor Ignatius Yaqub II, Patriarch of Antioch.
- Dionysius VI(Vattesseril) (1909–1911/1934) Consecrated by Mor Ignatius Abded Aloho II, Patriarch of Antioch.

Schism in the Malankara Church occurred in 1911 when Dionysius VI was deposed by Ignatius Abded Aloho II. This led to Dionysius VI going to Ignatius Abded Mshiho II, the deposed predecessor of Ignatius Abded Aloho II, to lift the deposition, and reestablish the historic Catholicate of the East in Malankara, with autocephaly for the Malankara Church. This resulted in two lines, the Malankara Orthodox Syrian Church, which followed Dionysius VI, rejecting his deposition and following his pursuits for autocephaly, and the Malankara Jacobite Syrian Church, which recognized the deposition of Dionysius VI and the subsequent appointments of Malankara Metropolitans under the Patriarchate of Antioch.

== List of Malankara Metropolitans of Malankara Jacobite Syrian Church (1911-1958) ==
- Coorilos Paulose(1911–1917) Consecrated by Mor Ignatius Abded Aloho II, Patriarch of Antioch. He was elected Malankara Metropolitan by the Syrian Christian Association, that supported the Patriarch of Antioch after the deposition of Mor Dionysius VI Vattesseril.
- Athanasius Paulose (1918–1953) Consecrated by Mor Ignatius Aphrem I, Patriarch of Antioch.
- Clemis Abraham(1957–1958) Consecrated by Mor Ignatius Aphrem I, Patriarch of Antioch. He relinquished his position to Mor Baselios Geevarghese II, after reunification in the Malankara Church.

== List of Malankara Metropolitans of the Reunified Malankara Church (1934-1975) ==
In the Malankara Orthodox line, Dionysius VI was succeeded by Baselios Geevarghese II after his death in 1934. In 1958, there was a reunion between the two lines with Clemis Abraham of the Malankara Jacobite line stepping down from his position for the sake of reunion.

Sources:

- Geevarghese II (1934/1958–1964) From 1934, the Malankara Metropolitan also held the office of Catholicos of the East of the Malankara Orthodox Syrian Church. In 1958, the Malankara Orthodox Syrian Church and the Malankara Jacobite Syrian Church reunited during his tenure.
- Augen I (1964–1975), also Catholicos of the East. Ordained by Mor Ignatius Yaqub III, Patriarch of Antioch. Recognized as the first Catholicos of the Syriac Orthodox Church after its reestablishment in India.

Conflicts between Ignatius Yacoub III, Patriarch of Antioch and Baselios Augen I lead to his deposition by the Syriac Orthodox Synod in 1975, and the subsequent ordaination of Baselios Paulose II as Catholicos. This led to the two factions reemerging, with the Malankara Jacobite Syrian Church accepting the deposition and Baselios Paulose II as Catholicos, and the Malankara Orthodox Syrian Church rejecting it, and recognizing Baselios Augen I as Catholicos until his death, and the Baselios Marthoma Mathews I as his successor.

== List of Malankara Metropolitans of Malankara Jacobite Syrian Church (1975-present) ==
Sources:

- Baselios Paulose II (1975–1996), also Catholicos of the East. Ordained by Mor Ignatius Yaqub III, Patriarch of Antioch.
- Gregorios Geevarghese (1996–1999) Appointed Metropolitan Trustee by the Malankara Jacobite Syrian Christian Association, recognized by Mor Ignatius Zakka I, Patriarch of Antioch.
- Philoxenos Yuhannon (1999–2002) Appointed metropolitan trustee by the Malankara Jacobite Syrian Christian Association, recognized by Mor Ignatius Zakka I, Patriarch of Antioch. Relinquished his position after Mor Baselios Thomas I became Catholicos. Served as Bishop of Malabar from 1985 until his retirement in 2010. He died in 2015.
- Baselios Thomas I (2002–2019), also Catholicos of the East. Ordained by Mor Ignatius Zakka I, Patriarch of Antioch. The position of Catholicos of the East of the Syriac Orthodox Church was legally renamed to Catholicos of India, and the Jacobite Syrian Christian Association was formed to manage the affairs of the church, following the Supreme Court Order. He retired from his position as Malankara Metropolitan in 2019, due to old age, but still serves as the Catholicos of India.
- Baselios Joseph (2019–Present), Also Catholicos of the East. Appointed Metropolitan Trustee by the Jacobite Syrian Christian Association in 2019 following the retirement of Mor Baselios Thomas I. Bestowed the title of Malankara Metropolitan by Mor Ignatius Aphrem II, Patriarch of Antioch in 2024. Ordained as Catholicos of India by Mor Ignatius Aphrem II in 2025.

== List of Malankara metropolitans of the Malankara Orthodox Syrian Church (1975-present) ==
- Mathews I (1975–1991), also Catholicos of the East
- Mathews II (1991–2005),[46] also Catholicos of the East. The Supreme Court of India recognized the Malankara Orthodox Syrian Church line as the legal Malankara Metropolitanate in 2002 during his tenure.
- Didymos I (2005–2010), also Catholicos of the East
- Paulose II (2010–2021), also Catholicos of the East
- Mathews III (15th Oct 2021–Present), also Catholicos of the East
