= Mar Thoma =

Mar Thoma may refer to:

== Community ==
- Saint Thomas Christians or Mar Thoma Christians or Nasrani people of Kerala.

== Institutions ==
- Mar Thoma Syrian Church also known as Mar Thoma Church

== People ==
- Saint Thomas
- Thoma I, first indigenous Metropolitan of Malankara
- Thoma II
- Thoma III
- Thoma IV
- Thoma V
- Dionysius I, Metropolitan of Malankara
- Thoma VII
- Thoma VIII
- Thoma IX
- Pulikkottil Dionysius II
- Punnathra Dionysius III
- Dionysius IV of Cheppad
- Mathews Athanasius
- Thomas Athanasius
- Titus I Mar Thoma
- Titus II Mar Thoma
- Abraham Mar Thoma
- Juhanon Mar Thoma
- Alexander Mar Thoma
- Philipose Mar Chrysostom Mar Thoma
- Joseph Mar Thoma
