= Metropolitan bishop =

Ecclesiastical office

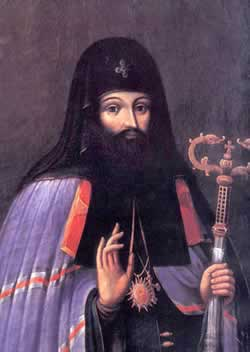
Petro Mohyla, Metropolitan of Kiev, Galicia and all Rus'

In Christian churches with episcopal polity, the rank of metropolitan bishop, or simply metropolitan (alternative obsolete form: metropolite), is held by the diocesan bishop or archbishop of a metropolis.

Originally, the term referred to the bishop of the chief city of a historical Roman province, whose authority in relation to the other bishops of the province was recognized by the First Council of Nicaea (AD 325). The bishop of the provincial capital, the metropolitan, enjoyed certain rights over other bishops in the province, later called "suffragan bishops".

The term metropolitan may refer in a similar sense to the bishop of the chief episcopal see (the "metropolitan see") of an ecclesiastical province. The head of such a metropolitan see has the rank of archbishop and is therefore called the metropolitan archbishop of the ecclesiastical province. Metropolitan (arch)bishops preside over synods of the bishops of their ecclesiastical province, and canon law and tradition grant them special privileges.

In some churches, such as the Church of Greece, a metropolis is a rank granted to all episcopal sees. Their bishops are all called metropolitans, the title of archbishop being reserved for the primate.

== Origins ==
As Christianity expanded in the Roman Empire, larger concentrations of believers were to be found in urban environs. The Bishop of such cities came to hold a pre-eminence of honour in the province of which his diocese was the capital, with some eventually gaining a primacy even over other provinces with their own primus inter pares. By the middle of the 3rd century Carthage had become the leading see in Roman North Africa. The Council of Nicea codified this arrangement into canon law in accordance with the growing standardisation of ecclesiastical diocesan structure along the lines of secular Roman blueprints. It also gave the first documented use of the term "Metropolitan" in reference to such bishops as had the presidency over a province. Meanwhile, Rome, Alexandria, and Antioch had grown in ecclesiastical prominence such that by the early 4th century they had long-recognised jurisdiction over more than one province of bishops each. Alexandria had attained primacy over Roman Egypt, Roman Libya, and Pentapolis. The Bishop of Rome had Primatial authority over provinces within 100 miles of the city. By virtue of their authority over multiple provinces, the sees of Rome, Alexandria, and Antioch were by this time already exercising "supra-metropolitan" reach that would later be extended and become known as Patriarchates. After Nicaea the designation of Metropolitan applied to such sees as Caesarea and Carthage, which by the late 4th century had a recognised primacy over multiple provinces of Syria Palaestina and the wider Maghreb, respectively. With the Imperial Capital having moved to Byzantium in 330, the renamed city of Constantinople became increasingly important in church affairs of the Greek East. The See of Constantinople was granted Archepiscopal status prior to a council held in the city in 381. Coinciding with the city's use as the Imperial residence, the See of Milan was elevated to Metropolitan/Archepiscopal status by the time of the presidency of Ambrose (374–397) and temporarily exercised primacy over Northern Italy (the Diocesis Italia annonaria, which included territory across the Alps to the Danube). All provinces of Italy were under the broader Primatial oversight of the Archbishop of Rome at least by the end of the 4th century.

== Catholic Church ==
Heraldic elements of a coat of arms of a Latin Catholic metropolitan archbishop (without the arms)

=== Latin Church ===
In the Latin Church, an ecclesiastical province, composed of several neighbouring dioceses, is headed by a metropolitan, the archbishop of the diocese designated by the Pope. The other bishops are known as suffragan bishops.

The metropolitan's powers over the dioceses of his province, other than his own diocese, are normally limited to:

1. supervising observance of faith and ecclesiastical discipline and notifying the Pope of any abuses;
2. carrying out, for reasons approved beforehand by the Holy See, a canonical inspection that the suffragan bishop has neglected to perform;
3. appointing a diocesan administrator if the college of consultors fails to elect an at least 35-year-old priest within eight days after the vacancy of the see becomes known; and
4. serving as the default ecclesiastical court for appeals from decisions of the tribunals of the suffragan bishops.

The metropolitan also has the liturgical privilege of celebrating sacred functions throughout the province, as if he were a bishop in his own diocese, provided only that, if he celebrates in a cathedral church, the diocesan bishop has been informed beforehand.

The metropolitan is obliged to request the pallium, a symbol of the power that, in communion with the Church of Rome, he possesses over his ecclesiastical province. This holds even if he had the pallium in another metropolitan see.

It is the responsibility of the metropolitan, with the consent of the majority of the suffragan bishops, to call a provincial council, decide where to convene it, and determine the agenda. It is his prerogative to preside over the provincial council. No provincial council can be called if the metropolitan see is vacant.

The metropolitans of a given territory are also involved in the selection of bishops. Every three years, they compile a list of promovendis - a list of priests who may be suitable for the office of bishop. This is forwarded to the local Apostolic Nuncio, who evaluates the candidates in a consultative and confidential process. The Nuncio in turn forwards the best candidates to the Congregation for Bishops in Rome, who conduct a final evaluation of candidates and offer their findings to the Pope for his final decision of appointment.

=== Eastern Catholic ===
==== Within patriarchal or major archiepiscopal churches ====
In those Eastern Catholic Churches that are headed by a patriarch, metropolitans in charge of ecclesiastical provinces hold a position similar to that of metropolitans in the Latin Church. Among the differences is that Eastern Catholic metropolitans within the territory of the patriarchate are to be ordained and enthroned by the patriarch, who may also ordain and enthrone metropolitans of sees outside that territory that are part of his church. Similarly, a metropolitan has the right to ordain and enthrone the bishops of his province. The metropolitan is to be commemorated in the liturgies celebrated within his province.

A major archbishop is defined as the metropolitan of a certain see who heads an autonomous Eastern church not of patriarchal rank. The canon law of such a church differs only slightly from that regarding a patriarchal church. Within major archepiscopal churches, there may be ecclesiastical provinces headed by metropolitan bishops.

==== As heads of their own particular churches ====
There are also autonomous Eastern Catholic Churches consisting of a single province and headed by a metropolitan. Metropolitan archbishops of Eastern Catholic Churches sui juris are appointed by the Pope (rather than elected by their synod) and have much less authority even within their own churches. Metropolitans of this kind are to obtain the pallium from the Pope as a sign of his metropolitan authority and of his church's full communion with the Pope, and only after his investment with it can he convoke the Council of Hierarchs and ordain the bishops of his autonomous church. In his autonomous church it is for him to ordain and enthrone bishops and his name is to be mentioned immediately after that of the Pope in the liturgy.

== Eastern Orthodox Church ==
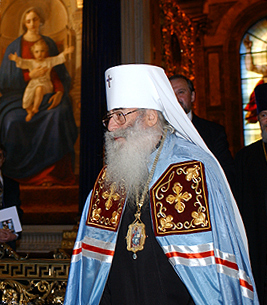
Metropolitan Vladimir of Saint Petersburg wearing the light blue mandyas of a Russian Orthodox metropolitan

In the Eastern Orthodox Church, the title of metropolitan is used variously, in terms of rank and jurisdiction.

In terms of rank, in some Eastern Orthodox churches metropolitans are ranked above archbishops in precedence, while in others that order is reversed. Primates of autocephalous Eastern Orthodox churches below patriarchal rank are generally designated as archbishops. In the Greek Orthodox churches, archbishops are ranked above metropolitans in precedence. The reverse is true for some Slavic Orthodox churches (Russian Orthodox, Bulgarian Orthodox) and also for Romanian Orthodox Church, where metropolitans rank above archbishops and the title can be used for important regional or historical sees.

Some Eastern Orthodox churches have functioning metropolitans on the middle (regional) level of church administration. In the Romanian Orthodox Church there are six regional metropolitans who are the chairmen of their respective synods of bishops, and have special duties and privileges. For example, the Metropolitan of Oltenia has regional jurisdiction over four dioceses.

On the other hand, in some Eastern Orthodox churches title of metropolitan is only honorary, with no special or additional jurisdiction. In the Serbian Orthodox Church, honorary title of metropolitan is given to diocesan bishops of some important historical sees (Article 14 of the Constitution of Serbian Orthodox Church). For example, the diocesan bishop of the Eparchy of Montenegro and the Littoral is given the honorary title of metropolitan, but without any jurisdiction over other diocesan bishops in Montenegro. The diocesan bishop of the Eparchy of Dabar-Bosnia is also given the honorary title of metropolitan, but without any jurisdiction over other diocesan bishops in Bosnia and Herzegovina.

== Oriental Orthodox Churches ==
=== Malankara churches ===
Metropolitan is a title used by all Oriental Orthodox Churches in Malankara following Syriac Orthodox Church tradition. Malankara Metropolitan was a legal title given to the head of the Malankara Syrian Church, aka Puthencoor (New Allegiance) Syrian Christians, by the Government of Travancore and Cochin in South India. This title was awarded by a proclamation from the King of Travancore and the King of Cochin to the legal head of the Malankara Church. Both factions within the Malankara Church have claims to the title.

Baselios Marthoma Mathews III was enthroned as Catholicos of the East and Malankara Metropolitan of the Malankara Orthodox Syrian Church. And Baselios Joseph was enthroned as Catholicos of India, Maphrian of the East And Malankara Metropolitan of Malankara Jacobite Syrian Orthodox Church.

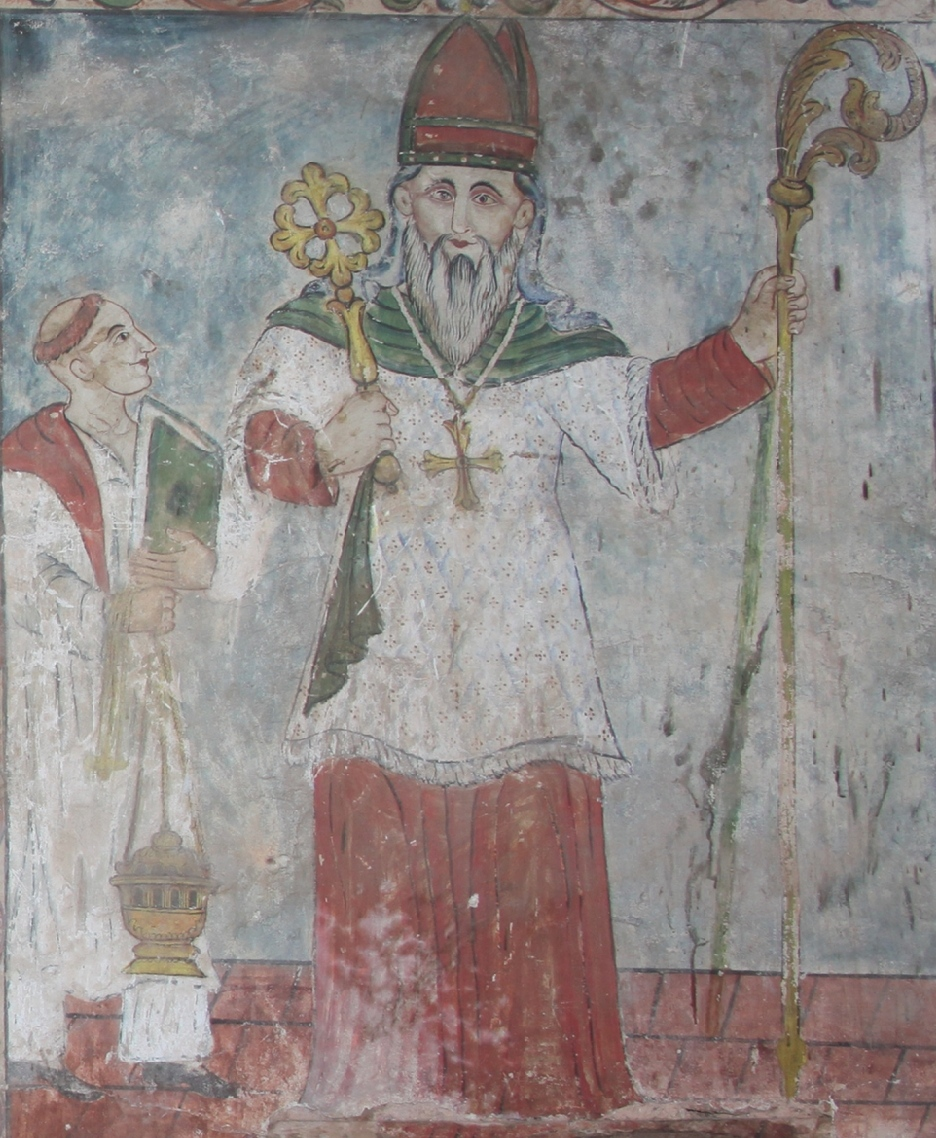
Mural of Mar Thoma I in traditional Malankara vestments from the St. Mary's Jacobite Soonoro Cathedral, Angamaly

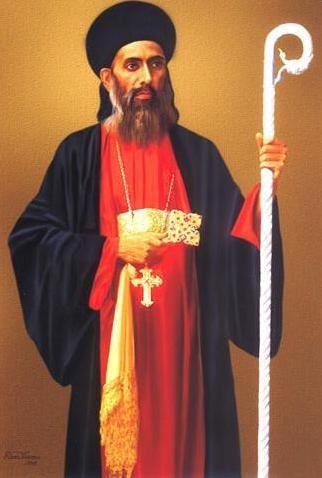
The late Metropolitan Geevarghese Gregorios of Parumala in traditional dress, painting by Raja Ravi Varma

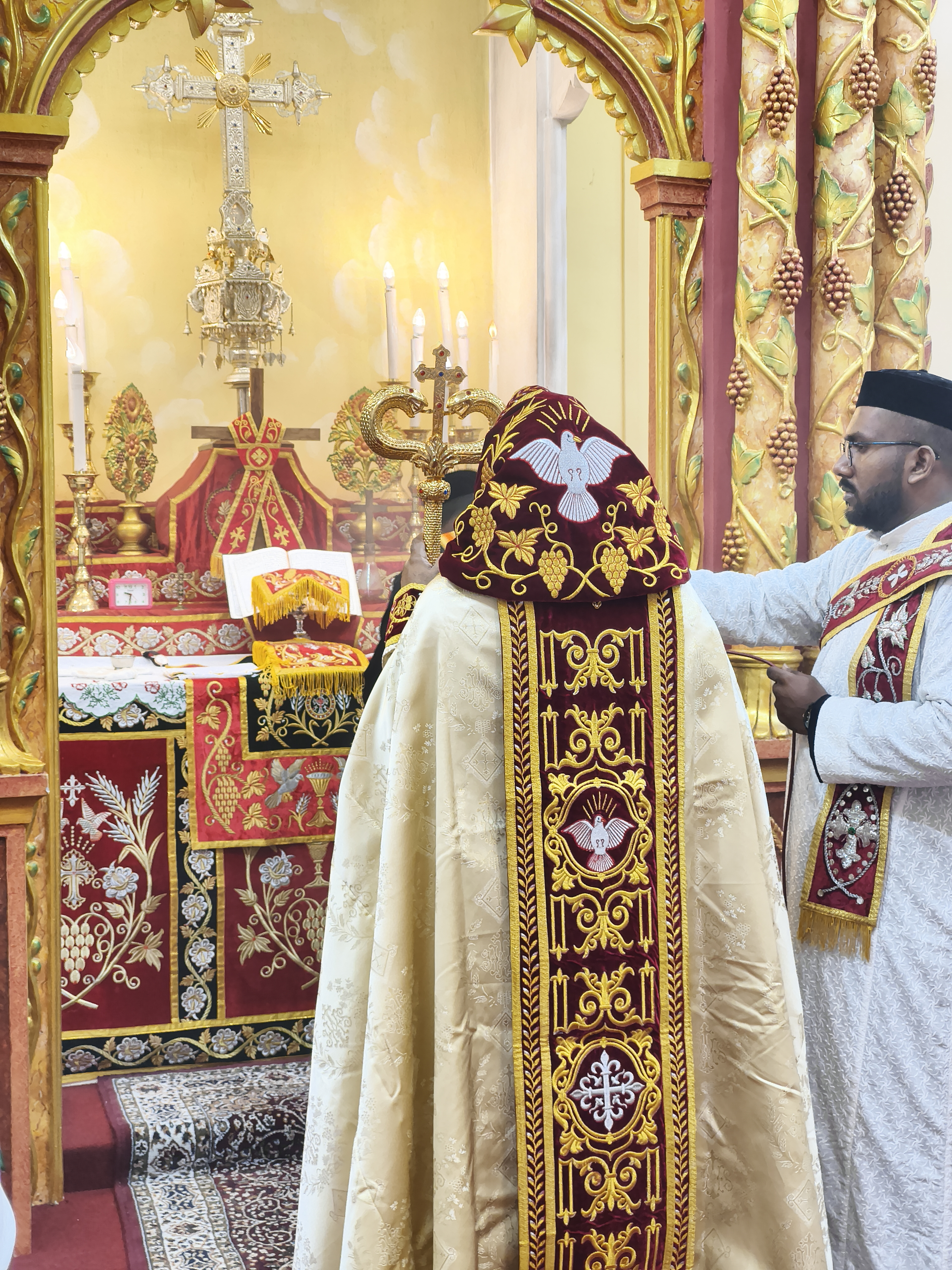
liturgical Vestment of Metropolitan Bishop and Deacon of Syriac Orthodox Church in India

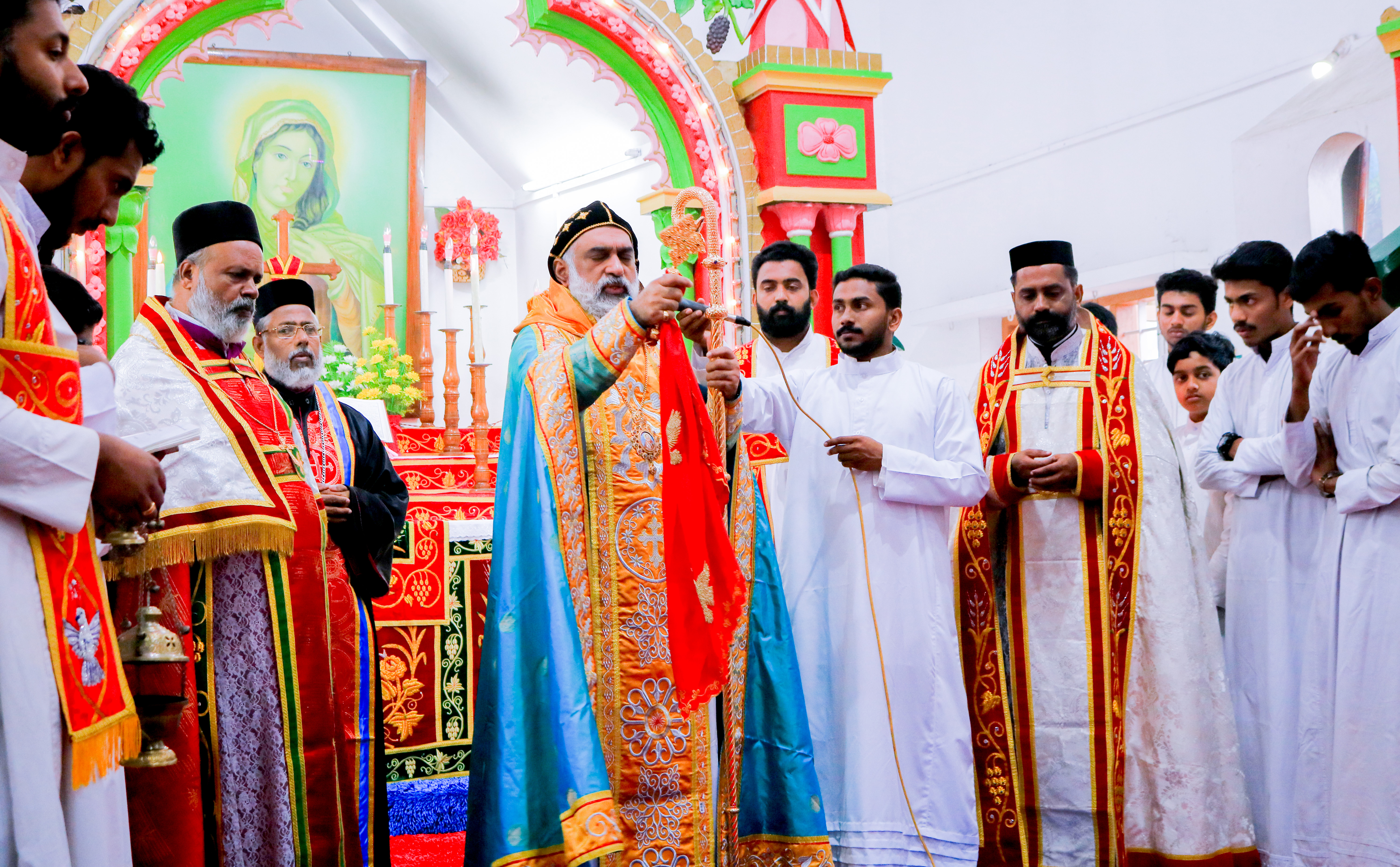
Liturgical vestments of the clergy wearing their different vestments

== Other Eastern Christians ==
In the Malankara Mar Thoma Syrian Church which is based in India, the metropolitan also known as the Mar Thoma is the primate and supreme head of the church who is entitled to special privileges and remains the ultimate authority over the synod. Philipose Mar Chrysostom is the senior metropolitan as of 28 August 2007, and Joseph Mar Thoma was installed on 2 October 2007 as the 21st Malankara Metropolitan.

== Anglican Communion ==
In the Anglican Communion, a metropolitan is generally the head of an ecclesiastical province (or cluster of dioceses). In the few Anglican churches with multiple provinces headed by metropolitans (namely the Church of England, the Church of Ireland, the Anglican Church of Canada, the Anglican Church of Australia, and the Church of Nigeria), a metropolitan ranks immediately under the primate or senior metropolitan of the national church. Most metropolitans, but not all, are styled archbishop. In England, Ireland, and Australia, each province has a "metropolitical see" whose diocesan bishop is ex officio metropolitan (such as the Archbishops of Canterbury and Sydney), while in Canada metropolitans are elected by the provincial houses of bishops from among the sitting diocesans. Prior to 1970, however, the metropolitan of the Province of Rupert's Land was always the bishop of the eponymous diocese, centred on Winnipeg. (Since then, only one Bishop of Rupert's Land, Walter Jones, has been elected metropolitan).

== Other Protestant ==
The title is used by the Indian Oriental Protestant Syrian Christian-like Pentecostal denomination the Believers Eastern Church as the current main leader of the church.

== See also ==
- Exarch
- Metropolitanate of Montenegro and the Littoral
- List of metropolitans and patriarchs of Moscow
- List of metropolitans of the Indian Orthodox Church
