= Pulikkottil Dionysius II =

19th-century Malankara Metropolitan

His Grace Pulikkottil Joseph Mar Dionysious I (Mar Dionysius II) Malankara Metropolitan
- Malankara Syrian Church
- Appointed: February 1816
- Term ended: 24 November 1816
- Predecessor: Mar Thoma IX
- Successor: Geevarghese Mar Philoxenos II (interim, 1816-1817); Mar Dionysius III (1817-1825)

Orders
- Consecration: 22 March 1815 by Geevarghese Mar Philoxenos II

Personal details
- Born: Joseph Ittoop; 15 January 1742 Kunnamkulam
- Died: 24 November 1816 (aged 74) Kottayam
- Buried: Orthodox Theological Seminary, Kottayam

Pulikkottil Joseph Mar Dionysious I, born Pulikkottil Joseph Ittoop (15 January 1742 – 24 November 1816) was 10th Malankara Metropolitan for nine months until his death on 24 November 1816. He dethroned Mar Thoma IX and succeeded him by the favour of Col.John Munroe, then British Resident of Travancore.

Mar Joseph Mar Dionysius I is also known as Pulikkottil Joseph Mar Dionysius I as he was the first Metropolitan from the ancient Pulikkottil family of Kunnamkulam. He was able to keep up the traditions, improve the knowledge of the people and decree that the assets of the Metropolitan would be assets of the Church. During his lifetime, he renovated and managed St. Mary's Orthodox Cathedral, Arthat, one of the oldest churches in Kerala, masterminded in opening of the first formal educational institution in Kerala, namely the Orthodox Theological Seminary (Old Seminary)

His nephew Tharu Kurien's son Joseph was later ordained as Metropolitan by the Patriarch of Antioch and became Malankara Metropolitan. He was also given the same episcopal title Joseph Mar Dionysious (Mar Dionysius V) (1833–1909) and was known as Pulikkottil Mar Dionysious II.

== Early days ==
Joseph Ittoop was born on 15 January 1742 in Pulikkottil an ancient family which moved from Arthat to Kunnamkulam. He was ordained as a priest by Mar Thoma VI and was known as Pulikkottil Joseph Ittoop Kathanar. He was the vicar of his parish, Chattukulangara Arthat church. Mysore ruler Tippu Sultan invaded Guruvayur and adjacent areas, in AD 1789. The people of Kunnamkulam defended the attack with all their effort. The soldiers of Tippu Sultan set fire on Arthat church and murdered a number of people. One of them was killed inside the sanctuary. Witnessing all these atrocities Pulikkottil Joseph Kathanar had no other option but to hide inside the church. A large number of refugees left Arthat and settled in Kunnamkulam under the leadership of Joseph Kathanar. After Tippu Sultan left, Joseph Kathanar returned to the parish and renovated the church, removing that area of the sanctuary where the man was killed.

== Consecrations ==
=== As Ramban ===
As per the decision of the meeting of the representatives from parishes at Kandanad, on 14 September 1809, Pulikkottil Joseph Ittoop Kathanar was ordained as a Ramban.

=== Malankara Metropolitan ===
It was with the support of Col. Munroe, the resident of Travancore, Pulikkottil Joseph Ittoop Ramban was ordained as bishop PulikKottil Joseph Mar Dionysius by the bishop of Thozhiyur Church, Geevarghese Mar Philoxenos II(1811–29) on 22 March 1815. After the death of Mar Thoma VIII, who ordained his uncle Iype Kathanar as Mar Thoma IX in the traditional manner of succession, was forced to abdicate his position and hand over charge to Joseph Mar Dionysius as he was made the supreme head of the Malankara Church by a Royal proclamation issued by the ruler of Travancore and later by the ruler of Cochin. These were under the influence of Col. John Munroe. The proclamation required every Syrian Christian of Travancore-Cochin to obey the Malankara Metropolitan. He then took possessions of all insignia from Mar Thoma IX from kottayam. With tears in his eyes Mar Thoma IX left the seminary premises at kottayam and retired to home parish Kadamattom palli, spending rest of the life in prayer and fasting, as a monk. He was given the episcopal title Dionysius (a Graeco-Roman name), the second bishop in the Malankara Church to get this title.

== Orthodox Theological seminary ==
Pulikottil Joseph Ittoop Ramban travelled to Kottayam and founded the Seminary. The government of Travancore provided tax free land and the foundation stone was laid in February 1813. The work went on very fast and classes began in March 1815.

Qualified teachers to teach various subjects were also appointed. They were Maramon Palakunnathu Abraham Malpan (Syriac), Konattu Varghese Malpan (Syriac), Kozhikode Kunjan Assan (Sanskrit), Poet Laureate Chekottu Kuruvilla Assan (Malayalam) and from Kochi Mose Esarphathi (Hebrew & Greek) were the first teachers of this first education institution in Kerala.

=== English Missionaries ===
Rev. Dr. Claudius Buchanan (1766–1815) who visited Kerala in 1806, and met Mar Thoma VI. After his return to England, missionaries who were members of the Church Missionary Society (CMS) began to arrive in Kerala. Rev. Thomas Norton arrived in Kochi on 8 May 1816 and began to open schools in and around Alappuzha. Rev. Benjamin Baily arrived in October 1816 and established a printing press at Kottayam. He also began to translate the Bible into Malayalam.

== Last days ==
At the age of 74, and only nine months as Metropolitan, Pulikottil Joseph Mar Dionysius died on 24 November 1816. He was entombed at Kottayam Orthodox Pazhaya Seminary (Old Seminary).

As Dionysius had not named a successor, the fate of the Malankara Church was threatened. However, Geevarghese Mar Philoxenos II (1811–29) of the Malabar Independent Syrian Church stepped in to take over the duties of the Malankara Metropolitan and served as the Acting Malankara Metropolitan until ordaining a successor to Mar Dionysius II. Mar Philexenos ordained Mar Dionysius III in 1817.

The memorial feast of Mar Dionysius II is celebrated on 24 November. In recognition of his contributions to the Church, the Episcopal Synod of Malankara Orthodox Syrian Church conferred the honorary designation "Sabha-Jyothis" (Malayalam: സഭാ ജ്യോതിസ്, meaning 'light of the Church').

Malankara Church Titles
Preceded by Mar Thoma IX	Malankara Metropolitan of the Malankara Syrian Church; 1816	Succeeded by Mar Dionysius III

== See also ==
- Indian Orthodox Church
- Mar Thoma Syrian Church
- Syrian Malabar Nasrani
- Saint Thomas Christians
- Christianity in India
- List of Catholicoi of the East and Malankara Metropolitans
- List of Syrian Malabar Nasranis
- Mar Thoma VII
- Mar Thoma VIII
- Mar Thoma IX
- Punnathara Mar Dionysious (Mar Thoma XI)
- Geevarghese Mar Philoxenos II
- Kunnamkulam
