= St. Mary's Orthodox Cathedral, Puthencavu =

Coordinates: 9.320684°N 76.632514°E

St. Mary’s Orthodox Cathedral, Puthencavu
- St. Mary’s Orthodox Cathedral, Puthencavu
- Denomination: Malankara Orthodox Syrian Church; Parish
- Tradition: Malayalam
- Website: www.puthencavucathedral.com

History
- Founded: 2 December 1793

Administration
- Diocese: Chengannur Diocese

St. Mary's Orthodox Cathedral, Puthencavu is one of the important churches in South India, located at a village named Puthencavu (near Chengannur), Alappuzha district in Kerala state of India. The church is one of the oldest Christian churches in the Central Travancore region of Kerala.

== History ==
The people of Puthencavu depended on the old Suriyani Church in Chengannur or the church in Maramon before the establishment of this church. Due to the distance to the nearest church, Christians in the area decided to construct a church in Puthencavu itself. The Christians of Puthencavu decided to approach the Marthoma VI. During that time, the Travancore Maharaja had penalised the Marthoma VI per the request of the Dutch for the delayed payments of expenses in bringing the bishops: Mar Baselious Malprina, Mar Gregorios and Yohananon Ramban from Sheema during the times of Mar Thoma V. The Travancore government confiscated the metropolitan bishop's items and the goods and movable properties of the Niranam Church. It is believed that this church bell from Niranam Church is that which hangs even today on the East Fort gate of Padmanabhaswamy temple in Thiruvananthapuram. It is legendarily believed that the Tharakans and the Christians in Puthencavu saved the arrest of the metropolitan bishop by giving the money which was gathered for the construction of the church. The excess money after settling this was believed to be the source of vattipanam later, as follows: soon after becoming the Metropolitan Mar Thoma VII continued to discuss with Col. Macaulay, the British resident, and the church decided to deposit as loan in perpetuity a sum of 3000 Poovarahan (a poovarahan, known as Star Pagoda, had a market value of Rs. 10300). The deposit was handed over to Col. Maccaulay on 1 December 1808 and he issued the receipt. The agreement stipulated that interest should be paid to the Malankara Metropolitan. This deposit is now known as Vattipanam. Later when there was more than one metropolitan in the Malankara Church, it became necessary to decide the rightful authority to receive the interest. So the government convened meetings with the church leaders and according to their decision issued proclamations authorizing that person to be the metropolitan to receive the interest. This resulted in several court cases for several years until 1958.

The church was consecrated in the name of St. Mary in 1793 (malayalam year 969 Vrishchikam 19) by Mar Thoma VI. The church still preserves, even today, the room, bed and chapel of the first Holy Qurbana (eucharist) conducted by Marthoma VI. Mar Thoma VI stayed in Puthencavu from 1794 to 1808, due to which the place become the centre of Suriyani Christians of Puthenkoor of the Malankara Church. The remains of Mar Thoma VI, Mar Thoma VIII and Geevarghese Mar Philoxenos (the famous Puthencavil Kochu Thirumeni) who led the Malankara Sabha, are interred in this church.

Ayrookuzhiyil Abraham Kathanar (Sr.), youngest son of Ayrookuzhiyil Idicula Tharakan (Sr.) was the first vicar of this church in 1793 and was ordained by Marthoma VI. Thomas Kizhakethalaykkal, the father of Mar Philoxenos Thirumeni, Ayrookuzhiyil Abraham Kathanar (Jr.) etc., served long years as the vicars of this Church. Thomas Mar Athanasius (current Metropolitan of Chengannur Diocese) and nephew of Puthencavil Kochuthirumeni, Rev. C M Philipose Cor Episcopa are members of this church. The body of Ayrookuzhiyil Abraham Kathanar (Sr.) was buried inside the church. During the times of Abraham Kathanar (Sr.), Puthencavu church was the centre of the Puthencoor section of the Malankara Church. Ayrukuzhiyil Chandy Kathanar, youngest son of Abraham Kathanar (Sr.) followed the vicarship of the church after his father. Chandy Kathanar was ordinated to the priesthood by Mar Thoma VIII. Chandy Kathanar's youngest son, Abraham Kathanar (Jr.) (1818–1901), who was raised to priesthood by Cheppad Philipose Mar Dionysius, become the vicar of the church later. As the vicar of the participating church, Abraham Kathanar (Jr.) co-signed the famous Mavelikara Padiyola (1836) and Kallumkathra Padiyola (1843). Joseph Kathanar (1863–1947), son of Abraham Kathanar (Jr.) was the assistant vicar of the church. The body of Ayrookuzhiyil Abraham Kathanar (Jr.) was also buried inside the church even though he had moved as vicar of Puthencavu Marthoma church upon the formation of Marthoma Sabha.

On 9 December 1896, Rev. P.J. Dethos was consecrated as Titus II Mar Thoma Metropolitan at the Puthencavu Palli (then shared between both Orthodox and Mar Thoma churches). He was consecrated by Titus I Mar Thoma with the assistance of Geevarghese Mar Koorilose (Karumamkuzhi Pulikkottil) Metropolitan of the Malabar Independent Syrian Church.

Two perunals (church festivals) of Mar Anthrayos, the 17th-century Syrian saint Mor Anthrayos who was buried at Kallada, and Geevarghese Mar Philoxenos are celebrated in this church yearly. The wooden horse of Mar Anthrayos is still preserved in the church. There are a lot of folktales about the horse, on which the Anthrayos Bava used to travel at night.

The church is also the parent parish of several parishes within and around of the same diocese which includes Arattupuzha, Kurichimuttam, Piralassery, Mulakuzha, Koorthamala, Nellikkal, Idanadu, and Mangalam.

== Images ==
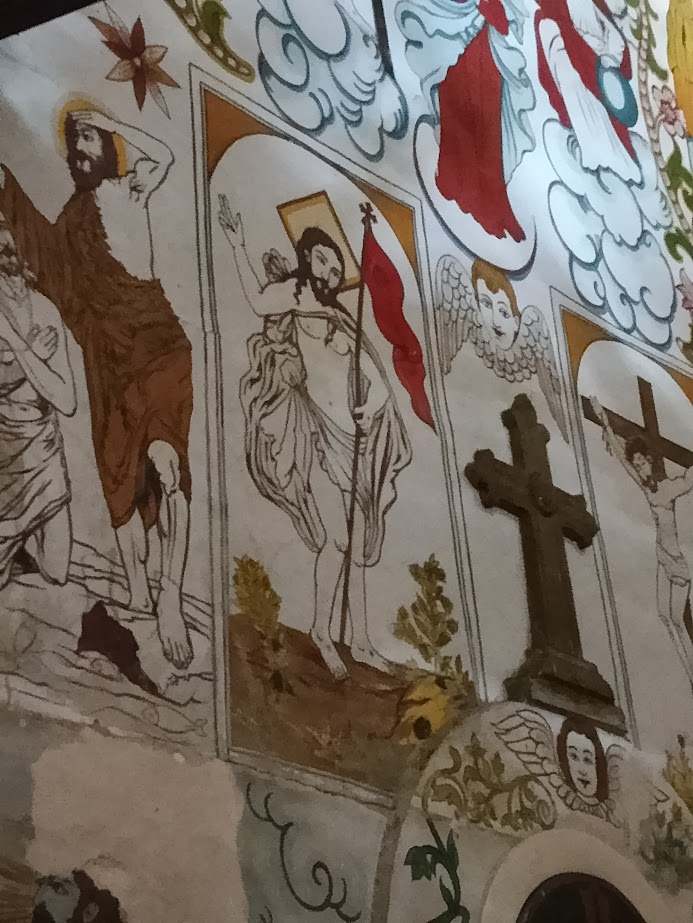
The Mural tradition of Kerala Churches in St. Mary's Orthodox Cathedral, Puthencavu. It also old painting in orthodox in Kerala (this is No.1)

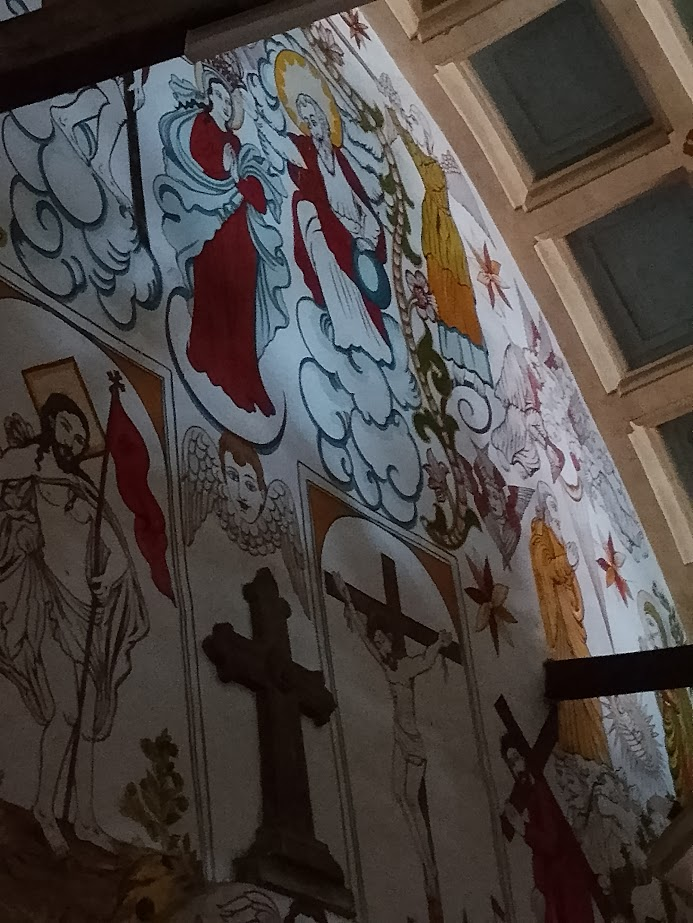
The Mural tradition of Kerala Churches in St. Mary's Orthodox Cathedral, Puthencavu. It also old painting in orthodox in Kerala (This is No 2)
