= Dionysius I of Malankara =

Mar Dionysius I Mar Thoma VI, Malankara Metropolitan
- Malankara Syrian Church
- Installed: 8 May 1765
- Term ended: 7 April 1808
- Predecessor: Mar Thoma V
- Successor: Mar Thoma VII

Personal details
- Died: 7 April 1808 Niranam
- Buried: St. Mary's Orthodox Cathedral, Puthencavu

Mar Thoma VI, also known as Mar Dionysius I, was the 6th Metropolitan of the Malankara Syrian Church, serving from 1765 until his demise on 7 April 1808. His original name was Iype, and he was born as the only son of Mathew (Mathan) Tharakan, the elder brother of Mar Thoma V, in the Pallippuram branch of the Pakalomattom Family(Andoor, Marangattupilly).

Thoma VI succeeded Mar Thoma V as Malankara Metropolitan in 1765, and unlike his predecessors, who were said by their opponents not to have been properly ordained as bishop, he received orders from Syriac Orthodox bishops in 1772, thus ending any controversy. Other events of his reign include the separation of the Thozhiyoor church (now the Malabar Independent Syrian Church), the arrival of English Protestant missionaries, and the first translation of the Bible from Syriac to Malayalam.

== Life ==
The man who would be Dionysius was the nephew of his predecessor as Malankara Metropolitan, Mar Thoma V, and a member of the Pakalomattom family. In 1757, as part of a play to assert his authority and autonomy in the Malankara Syrian Church, Thoma V consecrated his nephew as coadjutor bishop and named him his successor, in contradiction to the wishes of the Syriac Orthodox hierarchy. Upon Thoma V's death in 1765, the younger Pakalomattom was ordained as Metropolitan on 8 May, taking the name Thoma VI.

As with his predecessors as Metropolitan going back to the first, Mar Thoma I, Thoma VI's critics charged that his succession, and therefore his position, was invalid. To overcome this criticism, in 1772 Thoma VI underwent a second ordination at the hands of the Syriac Orthodox bishop Gregorios in the church in Niranam. He received all the holy orders, from the tonsure to the episcopal consecration, and thereafter took the name Mar Dionysius. Syriac Orthodox and other critics of Thoma VI saw this as his only ordination, while his supporters saw it as a "re-ordination", but either way, it ended the controversy over the validity of his position.

This done, Dionysius focused on his second primary aim of securing his place as the sole head of the Malankara Church, a measure opposed by some in the Syriac Orthodox hierarchy. To this end, Dionysius appealed to both the Catholic Church and the British colonial government in India. Several times he contacted the Catholic hierarchy, both locally and in Rome, seeking to have his church, with him as its designated head, brought into full communion. This would have the double aim of solidifying his authority and re-uniting all the Saint Thomas Christians, who had been split into Pazhayakoor (Catholic) and Puthenkoor (independent) factions since the Coonan Cross Oath of 1653. His appeals were considered in Rome, where the Church was willing to grant him temporal but not spiritual authority over the Saint Thomas Christians. In the end, however, no satisfactory deal was ever made and the factions remained separate.

In 1771, Gregorios consecrated a second bishop, Kattumangatt, who took the name Cyril (Koorilose). Dionysius saw Cyril as a threat to his authority and appealed to the colonial authorities to suppress the rival bishop. Cyril left for Thozhiyur, outside of the colonial jurisdiction, and established what would become an independent church. This body is now known as the Malabar Independent Syrian Church. Subsequently, however, Gregorios and the other Syrian bishops died and were not replaced, leaving no further internal challengers to Dionysius.

== Invasion by Mysore ==
Mysore was a landlocked kingdom. Hyder Ali, ruler of this kingdom decided to invade Malabar to get access to the Arabian Sea. He entered Malabar in 1781 and crushed the Nair soldiers. After his death Tippu Sultan came to the throne. During that period Christians were persecuted.

Bala Rama Varma was the ruler of Travancore at this time. He was one of the least popular sovereigns whose reign was marked by unrest and various internal and external problems for the state. He became King at the young age of sixteen and came under the influence of a corrupt nobleman known as Jayanthan Sankaran Nampoothiri from Calicut. One of the first acts of atrocities during his reign was the murder of Raja Kesavadas, the existing Dewan of Travancore. Sankaran Nampoothiri was then appointed as Dewan (Prime minister) with two other ministers. Using his influence, Mar Thoma VI was put in jail at Alleppy and was forced to conduct a service according to Catholic rites, but escaped during a rebellion in Travancore under Velu Thampi in 1799.

== Relations with the Church of England ==
Toward the end of Dionysius' reign, Claudius Buchanan (1766–1815) visited Kerala in 1806, and arranged for the translation of the Bible into Malayalam. Dionysius gave him the manuscript of the Bible written in the Syriac language. This manuscript was later deposited in the public library of the University of Cambridge.

During the visit, Buchanan suggested the Malankara Church seek a close relationship with the Church of England. Soon after his visit, Dionysius convened a meeting of church elders at Aarthattu, where he declared the Malankara Church would not accept the Anglican doctrine, nor those of any other foreign church.

== Death and succession ==
Dionysius consecrated Pakalomattom Mathen Kathanar as his successor in 1796 at Chengannur church. Dionysius died on 8 April 1808 at Niranam, and he was interred St. Mary's Orthodox Cathedral, Puthencavu, with Mathen conducting the funeral service. Mathen subsequently received his orders, taking the name Mar Thoma VII.

Malankara Church Titles
Preceded by Mar Thoma V	Metropolitan of the Malankara Church; 1765–1808	Succeeded by Mar Thoma VII
