= Thoma V =

Indian bishop

Mar Thoma V Malankara Metropolitan
- Malankara Syrian Church
- Installed: 1728
- Term ended: 8 May 1765
- Predecessor: Mar Thoma IV
- Successor: Mar Thoma VI

Personal details
- Born: Yossef (Hebrew), ( Ousep- Malayalam) = Joseph (English)
- Died: 8 May 1765 Niranam
- Buried: Niranam Church (St.Mary's Orthodox Syrian Church, Niranam)

Mar Thoma V was the 5th Malankara Metropolitan who served puthenkoor from 1728 to 8 May 1765. He was born as Ousep (Yossef in Hebrew, Ousep-Malayalam, Joseph in English) to the Pallippuram branch of the Pakalomattom family, situated in Andoor, Marangattupilly, where his father served as administration chief of Vadakkumkur Kings. He was ordained in 1728 and served as Malankara Metropolitan for 37 years until his death on May 8, 1765. His final resting place is Niranam St. Mary's Church. His tenure faced numerous challenges and conflicts with bishops sent from the Syriac Orthodox Patriarchate in Antioch, resulting in some of these Syriac bishops being banished from the country and forced to return.

== Introduction ==
On the South Western coast of India lies a small state known as Kerala It was here in the first century, Thomas the Apostle arrived to preach the gospel to the Jewish community. Some of the Jews and locals became followers of Jesus of Nazareth. They were known as Malabar Nasrani people and their church as Malankara Church. They followed a unique Hebrew-Syriac Christian tradition which included several Jewish elements and Indian customs.

The Malayalam versions of the Canons of the Synod of Diamper use these titles throughout the report except in three places where they use the Latin word archidiaconus.

After the great swearing in 1653 it became necessary to appoint a bishop and Thoma 1 was consecrated. Thus began the period of Malankara Metropolitans with the title Marthoma.

== Consecration ==
By 1727, Thoma IV fell sick. So the leaders of the Malankara Church selected a successor for him. He was consecrated as Mar Thoma V.

On 24 March 1728, Mar Thoma IV died and Mar Thoma V, took charge as the Malankara Metropolitan. He made Kandanad (Pallikara Palli) his headquarters.

== Arrival of foreign bishops ==
Ivanios a bishop from Antioch arrived in 1748. He lived in Mulanthuruthy Church and taught Syriac to the deacons. Abraham and Geevarghese of Kattumangattu family were his students. It was found that his teachings were unacceptable to the Malankara church and so in 1751 he was banished from Kerala. Before leaving for Antioch in 1751, Ivanios ordained Kattumangattu Abraham and Geevarghese as priests. They later became the founder fathers of Malabar Independent Syrian Church.

The Dutch East India Company (Vereenigde Oost-Indische Compagnie or VOC in old-spelling Dutch, literally "United East Indian Company") was established in 1602. They attached Cochin and the king of Cochin surrendered to the Dutch on 20 March 1663. During the time of Thoma V they were in control of Cochin and the surrounding areas. Thoma requested the help of the Dutch company to bring a bishop from outside and agreed to pay the passage.

Ignatious Geevarghese III, patriarch of Antioch heard about this and immediately sent Baselios Shakralla, Gregorios, Ramban Yuhanon, Geevarghese Corepiscopa, Yuhanon Kassessa and four other priests. They arrived at Cochin in 1751. Thoma sent priests to receive them. They were expecting one or two visitors, but there were nine. Their passage came up to Rs. 12, 000. Neither the Church nor Thoma could pay that much. Dutch wouldn't allow them to disembark without payment. In the end Thoma was put in jail. Hearing this, Niranam Church under the leadership of a Kathanar began to collect money. After three months, with all the collections they were able to pay part of the amount and the Dutch released Thoma and the bishops. Thoma never tried to meet these visitors. But they insisted that Thoma should receive their Kaiveppu (laying of hands) and change his name from Mar Thoma to Dionysius. Thoma V, refused to comply.

In 1754, they made an agreement with Thoma V, not to ordain priests in Malankara Syrian Church.

== Last days ==
In 1761, Mar Thoma V consecrated his nephew Ipe as his successor, bestowing upon him the title Mar Thoma VI. This act was carried out independently, without the involvement of foreign bishops, effectively severing all ties to external allegiances. Mar Thoma VI, the only son of Mar Thoma V's elder brother Mathew Tharakan, assumed leadership following this solemn ceremony.

Mar Thoma V died on May 8, 1765, at Niranam, and his final resting place is at Niranam Palli. The funeral rites were presided over by Mar Thoma VI, marking a seamless transition of leadership within the community.

Malankara Church Titles
Preceded by Mar Thoma IV	Metropolitan of the Malankara Church; 1728–1765	Succeeded by Mar Thoma VI

== See also ==
- Malankara Jacobite Syriac Orthodox Church
- Malankara Orthodox Syrian Church
- Mar Thoma Syrian Church of Malabar
- List of Catholicoi of the East and Malankara Metropolitans
