= Thozhiyoor =

Village in Kerala state, India

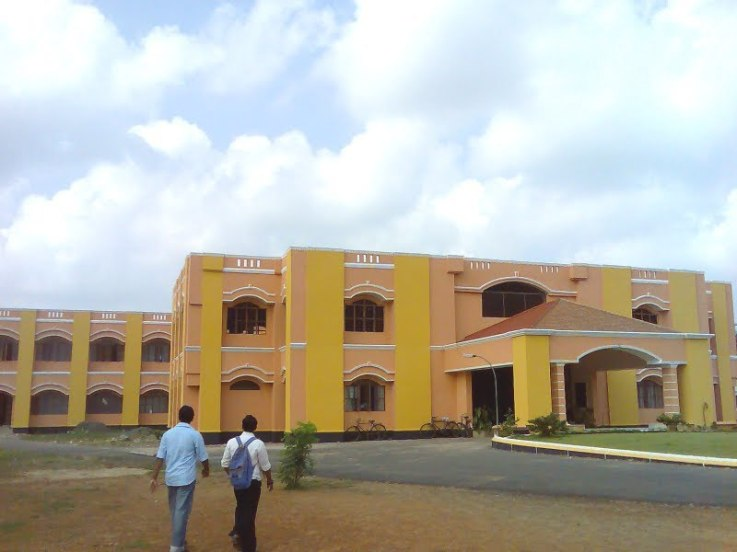
ICA College, Thozhiyoor

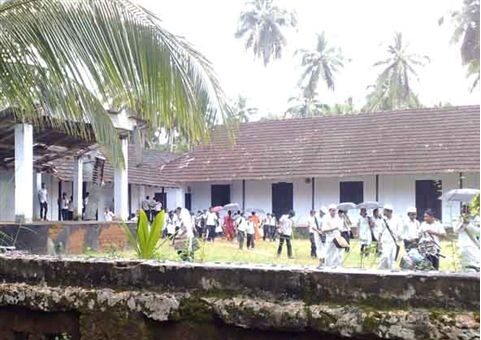
St.George High School

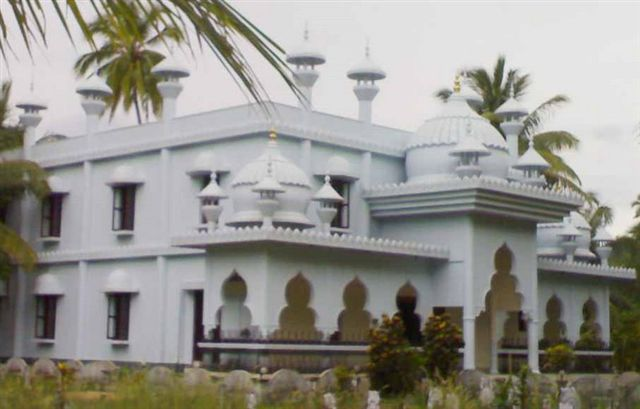
PMJ Thozhiyoor

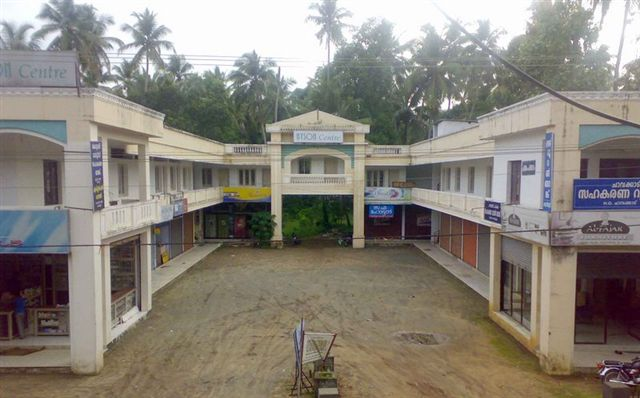
Hyson Center

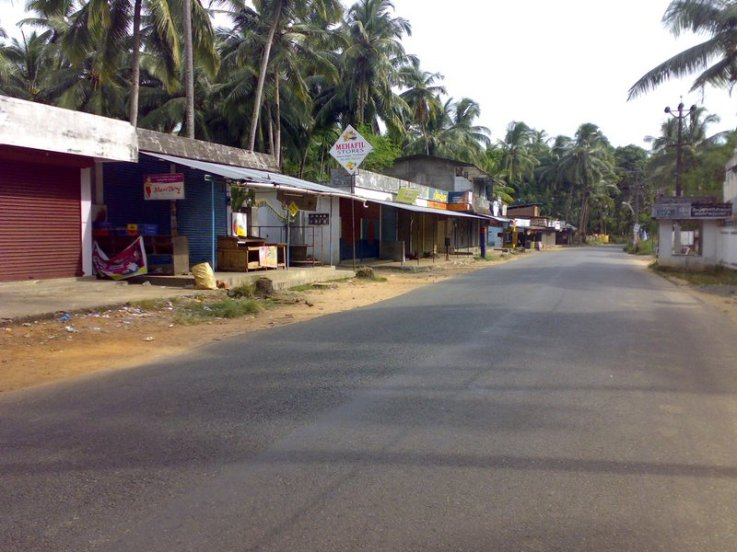

Thozhiyoor is a village in the Guruvayoor Municipality of Chavakkad Taluk (Thrissur District) in Kerala state, India.

== Location ==
This landscape is located around 8 km east from the Arabian Sea and 8 km west from Kunnamkulam which is divided into two portions by the Guruvayoor-Ponnani Main Road. The income in this locality is mainly depended on the remittances of Non-Resident Indians (NRI's) and agriculture.
