= Thoma VII =

Mar Thoma VII Malankara Metropolitan
- Malankara Syrian Church
- Installed: 1808
- Term ended: 4 July 1809
- Predecessor: Mar Thoma VI
- Successor: Mar Thoma VIII

Orders
- Consecration: 1796

Personal details
- Born: Mathen Kurichithanam, Pala
- Died: 4 July 1809 Kandanad
- Buried: Kolenchery Church (St. Peter's & St. Paul's Orthodox Syrian Church, Kolenchery)

Mar Thoma VII was a Bishop of the Malankara Church from 1796 and the 7th Malankara Metropolitan from April 1808 to July 1809. Born in Pakalomattom family in Kurichithanam, Pala, he was well known as an efficient administrator, deeply religious but was a quiet and reserved person. During his time, a difficult period in the history of Travancore State, the church was able to help Travancore government by depositing an amount as fixed deposit, which came to be known as Vattipanam.

== Introduction ==
On the South Western coast of India lies a small state known as Kerala It was here in the first century, Thomas the Apostle arrived to preach the gospel to the Jewish community. Some of the Jews and locals became followers of Jesus of Nazareth. They were known as Malabar Nasrani people and their church as Malankara Church. They followed a unique Hebrew-Syriac Christian tradition which included several Jewish elements and Indian customs.

In Malankara (Kerala) St. Thomas did not appoint any bishops, but an elder (Mooppen in Malayalam) was selected to lead the people. The parish leader was called Edavaka Mooppen and the church as a whole had a Malankara Mooppen. This was the tradition till 1653.

The Malayalam versions of the Canons of the Synod of Diamper use these titles throughout the report except in three places where they use the Latin word archidiaconus. There is no chance for the Malankara Church to use this Latin word. Portuguese were not familiar with the Malayalam wording Malankara Mooppen and so they might have used archidiaconus. The Malayalam name Jathikku Karthavian, given by some historians was not used in the Malayalam version of the canons.

== Early life ==
Mathen was born in Pakalomattom family in Kurichithanam, Pala. He became a deacon and a priest at a very early age. He was known as Mathen Kathanaar.

== Consecration ==
Mathen Kathanar was consecrated as his successor by Mar Thoma VI in 1796 at Chengannur church and was given the traditional episcopal title Mar Thoma VII.

== Vattipanam (Fixed deposit) ==
In 1790, Sakthan Thampuran (1751–1805), became the ruler of Kochi. He was an efficient ruler. He never encouraged Portuguese Missioners but offered land and other grants to Syrian Christians. His Grants to Syrian Christians paved way for the flourish of Syrian Christians in Trichur District. During his time the business in foreign trade improved. This resulted in more income to the people. Church members gave more to the church. The church made improvements to its buildings. Still the church had more savings. This was the condition of Kochi when Mar Thoma VI was consecrated in 1796.

But by 1799, situation in Travancore was different. When Velu Thampi took charge as the Dalawa (prime minister) of Travancore, treasury was empty. At that time Velu Thampi was in good terms with the British. He made an agreement with them. According to that Travancore had to pay a large sum to the British for protection. So the Travancore government was forced to collect more money from its people.

It was at this time Mar Thoma VI and Mar Thoma VII, discussed what to do with the extra money. They thought of depositing the additional income as a fixed deposit and with the interest they could begin training the priests.

While it was going on Mar Thoma VI died on 8 April 1808 at Niranam and Mar Thoma VII was enthroned as the Malankara Metropolitan.

Soon after becoming the Metropolitan Mar Thoma VII continued to discuss with Col. Macaulay, the British resident, and the church decided to deposit as loan in perpetuity a sum of 3000 Poovarahan (Market value of a poovarahan, known as Star Pagoda had a market value of Rs 3.50 in 2002). The deposit was handed over to Col. Maccaulay on 1 December 1808 and he issued the receipt. The agreement stipulated that interest should be paid to the Malankara Metropolitan. This deposit is now known as Vattipanam.

Later when there were more than one Metropolitans in Malankara church, it became necessary to decide the rightful authority to receive the interest. So the government convened meetings with the church leaders and according to their decision issued proclamations authorising that person to be the Metropolitan to receive the interest. This continued till the death of Mathews Mar Athanasius in 1877. When dispute arose, government decided that the church should ask the courts to decide to whom the interest is to be paid. Later, In 1889 Royal Court (in Seminary Suit) declared Pulikkottil Joseph Mar Dionysious II as the Malankara Metropolitan and Also in 1928, the High Court of Travancore (in Vattipanam SUIT), declared that Vattasheril Dionysius VI will remain as the Malankara Metropolitan

== Last days ==
After the enthronement Mar Thoma lived at Puthenkavu (near Chengannur). But soon he moved his headquarters to Kandanad (near Kochi). There he became seriously ill. He did not get time to call a meeting of the church leaders to select his successor. So he invited one of his relatives Thoma Kathanar, to his bed side, laid his hands on him prayed and declared him as Mar Thoma VIII. Two days after this, on 4 July 1809 Mar Thoma VII died and was laid to rest at Kolenchery Church (now known as St. Peter's & St. Paul's Orthodox Church, Kolenchery). The funeral service was conducted by Mar Thoma VIII.

Malankara Church Titles
Preceded by Mar Thoma VI	Metropolitan of the Malankara Church; 1808–1809	Succeeded by Mar Thoma VIII

== See also ==
- Malankara Jacobite Syriac Orthodox Church
- Malankara Orthodox Syrian Church
- Mar Thoma Syrian Church of Malabar
- Syrian Malabar Nasrani
- Saint Thomas Christians
- Christianity in India
- List of Catholicoi of the East and Malankara Metropolitans
- List of Syrian Malabar Nasranis
- Mar Thoma VI
- Mar Thoma VIII
