= Thoma IX =

Mar Thoma IX Malankara Metropolitan
- Malankara Church
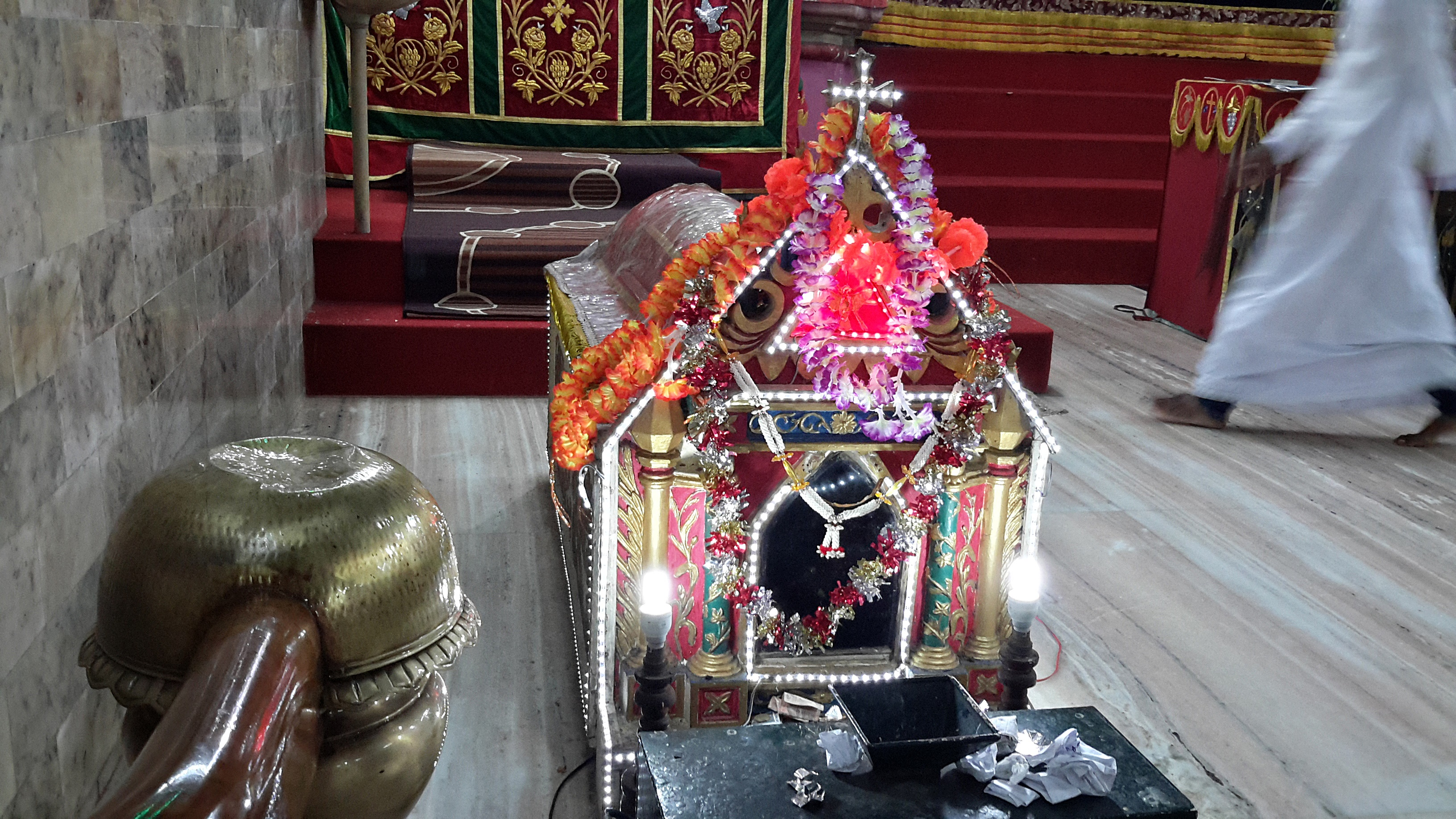
- Tomb of Marthoma IX at Kadamattom Church
- Installed: 1816
- Predecessor: Mar Thoma VIII
- Successor: Mar Dionysius II

Personal details
- Born: Iype Kadamattam
- Died: 1817 Kadamattam
- Buried: Kadamattom Church (St. George Orthodox Church, Kadamattom)

Mar Thoma IX was the ninth Metropolitan of the Malankara Church in Kerala, India for a brief period in 1816. That year, he was consecrated Metropolitan by Mar Thoma VIII, but soon after his ordination he was dethroned by Pulikkottil Joseph who was appointed by the then British resident Colonel John Munroe.

== Consecration ==
Iype, an uncle of Mar Thoma VIII, was born at Kadamattom. He was ordained as a Kathanar and was called "Iype Kathanar". While Mar Thoma VIII was on his death bed, he called Iype Kathanar, laid his hands on him, and consecrated him as his successor Mar Thoma IX.

== As Metropolitan ==
Mar Thoma VIII consecrated Mar Thoma IX, as his successor. Soon after the death of his predecessor, while Mar Thoma IX was at Puthencavu, he had received a letter from the British Resident in Travancore Coln. Munroe that he was not the approved Metropolitan and should handover all the charges to Pulikkottil Joseph Mar Dionysious I (Mar Thoma X) who was consecrated by Mar Philexinos of Thozhiyoor.

Mar Thoma IX was taken to Kottayam, by Pulikkottil Joseph Mar Dionysious and took possession of all insignia from Mar Thoma IX. With tears in his eyes Mar Thoma left the Seminary premises at Kottayam and retired to his home parish Kadamattom palli, spending the rest of his days in prayer and fasting, as a great Monk.

== Last days ==
He continued as a bishop till the end of his life. He died in 1817 and was laid to rest at St. George's Church, Kadamattom near Kolenchery, Muvattupuzha.

Malankara Church Titles
Preceded by Mar Thoma VIII	Metropolitan of the Malankara Church; 1816-1817	Succeeded by Pulikkottil Dionysius II

== See also ==
- Malankara Jacobite Syriac Orthodox Church
- Malankara Orthodox Syrian Church
- Mar Thoma Syrian Church of Malabar
- Syrian Malabar Nasrani
- Saint Thomas Christians
- Christianity in India
- List of Catholicoi of the East and Malankara Metropolitans
- List of Syrian Malabar Nasranis
