= Thoma VIII =

Mar Thoma VIII Malankara Metropolitan
- Malankara Syrian Church
- Installed: 2 July 1809
- Term ended: 26 January 1816
- Predecessor: Mar Thoma VII
- Successor: Mar Thoma IX

Personal details
- Born: Thoma
- Died: 26 January 1816 Niranam
- Buried: St. Mary's Orthodox Cathedral, Puthencavu

Mar Thoma VIII was the 8th Metropolitan of the Malankara Church in Kerala, India from 1809 to 1816. He was a man of vision. It was during his time Malankara church opened the first formal educational institution, in Kerala. With the opening of Kottayam Suryani Seminary, modern education dawned in Kerala.

== Consecration ==
While Mar Thoma VII was at Kandanad (near Kochi) he fell seriously ill. He did not get time to call a meeting of the church leaders to select his successor. So he invited one of his relatives Thoma Kathanar, to his bed side, laid his hands on him, prayed and consecrated him as Mar Thoma VIII on 2 July 1809. Two days later, on 4 July, Mar Thoma VII died and Mar Thoma VIII took charge of the Malankara church.

== Meeting of the church leaders ==
It was necessary for him to get the approval of the people to be a Malankara Metropolitan. For this reason soon after becoming Malankara Metropolitan, he convened a meeting of the representatives of the parishes at Kandanad, on 14 September 1809. In that meeting they,

1. Unanimously accepted Mar Thoma VIII as Malankara Metropolitan and presented him with the insignia, a ring.
2. Selected Kayamkulam philipose ramban from Kayamkulam and Pulikottil Ittoop Ramban from Kunnamkulam as advisers to the Metropolitan.
3. Agreed to use the interest received from Vattipanam, for opening of a Seminary.
4. Accepted a written constitution for the church. (This is known as Kandanad Padiola.)...

== Vattipanam (Fixed deposit) ==
For Malankara church, Mar Thoma VII, on 1 December 1808 deposited as loan in perpetuity a sum of 3000 Poovarahan with the government of Travancore through Col. Maccaulay the British resident. The first instalment of interest was due on 1 December 1809. It was paid to Mar Thoma VIII. But there were complaints that the interest was not used for opening the seminary.

In 1814 instead of giving this amount to the Malankara Metropolitan Mar Thoma VIII, the British resident Major Munroe handed over the amount (Rs. 3360) to Ramban Ittoop of Pulikottil. Giving the interest to someone who was not the Metropolitan angered the Governor of Madras also, who reprimanded Major Munroe. So in 1815 Ittoop Ramban received consecration as Metropolitan with the title of Pulikkottil Mar Dionysius from Mar Philexinos of Thozhyoor. Mar Thoma VIII complained to the resident but no action was taken.

== First education institution in Kerala ==
=== Seminary ===
Leaders of the church decided to have the Seminary at Kottayam, now Orthodox Pazhaya Seminary. The government of Travancore provided tax free land and the foundation stone was laid in February 1813. The work went on very fast and classes began in March 1815.

Qualified teachers to teach various subjects were also appointed. They were Maramon Palakunnathu Abraham Malpan (Syriac), Konattu Varghese Malpan (Syriac), Kozhikode Kunjan Assan (Sanskrit), Poet Laureate Chekottu Kuruvilla Assan (Malayalam) and from Kochi Mose Esarphathi (Hebrew & Greek) were the first teachers of this first education institution in Kerala. By 2000 Kerala became the most literate state in India.

== Last days ==
The actions and decisions of Major Munroe was a great blow to Mar Thoma VIII. Because of all these he fell sick and was bed ridden. For a better treatment he left Ankamali for Niranam. Knowing that his end was nearing, he called his uncle Kadamattathu, Iype Kathanar to his bedside, laid his hands on him, and consecrated him as his successor, Mar Thoma IX.

Though at Niranam he was given great care and better treatment, Mar Thoma VIII died on 26 January 1816 and was interred at St. Mary's Orthodox Cathedral, Puthencavu. The funeral service was conducted by his successor Mar Thoma IX.

Malankara Church Titles
| Preceded by Mar Thoma VII | Metropolitan of the Malankara Church; 1809–1816 | Succeeded by Mar Thoma IX |

== See also ==
- Malankara Jacobite Syriac Orthodox Church
- Malankara Orthodox Syrian Church
- Mar Thoma Syrian Church of Malabar
- List of Catholicoi of the East and Malankara Metropolitans
