= Malankara Metropolitan =

Title in Orthodox Christianity

The Malankara Metropolitan, also known historically as the Metropolitan of Malabar, is an ecclesiastical title traditionally associated with the head of the Malankara Syrian Church office. It was developed from the East Syriac metropolitans of India in the sixteenth century who were styled as Metropolitans of Malabar. Following the divisions among the Saint Thomas Christians, after the Synod of Diamper in 1599, the title became primarily associated with the West Syriac tradition, commonly known as the Malankara Church. Within this community, the office evolved as a continuation of the indigenous Archdeaconate that had long governed the local church.

== Overview ==
According to tradition, Thomas the Apostle established a Christian community on the Malabar Coast of India in the first century. When Portuguese Catholic missionaries arrived in Kerala in 1498, a period of increased Latin ecclesiastical influence began. Relations between the local church and the Church of the East diminished, and Portuguese interventions contributed to the events surrounding the Coonan Cross Oath, in which members of the Malankara Church declared that they would not submit to Portuguese ecclesiastical authority.

The title "Malankara Metropolitan" developed within the St. Thomas Christian tradition of Kerala as part of the community’s administrative structure. It emerged in the period following the Coonan Cross Oath (1653), when sections of the community sought to maintain ecclesiastical and administrative autonomy. Over time, the office came to denote the head of the Malankara Church, overseeing administrative and liturgical matters. The position has been recognized in civil law and acknowledged in relations with other Christian bodies.

The regional head of the Malankara Church holds the title of Malankara Metropolitan, in accordance with its ecclesiastical and canonical framework.

== Background ==
The Metropolitan was historically recognized within the Malankara Church through ecclesiastical tradition and the canonical authority of the Syriac Orthodox Patriarch of Antioch and all the East.

Temporal, ecclesiastical, and spiritual administration of the Malankara Church is vested in the Malankara Metropolitan. The Malankara Metropolitan oversees the liturgical, pastoral, and communal life of the members of the Malankara Church.

After the Coonan Cross Oath incident, in which the Saint Thomas Christians refused to submit to the Portuguese (Padroado), the first Malankara Metropolitan, Mar Thoma I, was ordained in 1653.

== Lineage ==
Historically, the primate or leader of Saint Thomas Christians was known as the Jathikku Karthavyan (leader of the community), Malankara Moopen (elder of the community), or the Archdeacon (Arkadiyakon, high priest). The Pakalomattom family has traditionally held this office. In the 16th century, the arrival of the Jesuits led to changes in the structure of the Saint Thomas Church.

In 1653, the Archdeacon position was elevated to Bishopric, and the Metropolitan Bishop assumed the honorific ecclesiastical title Mar Thoma. This title was used from 1653 to 1815. Later, a regular 'Bishopric' was established in Malankara by the Archbishop of Jerusalem Gregorios Abdal Jaleel.

== Title of Malankara Metropolitan ==
=== Prominence of Malankara ===
The position of the Malankara Metropolitan in the 19th century represents an upgrowth from the position of the previous Thomas and Archdeacons. The power and authority of the Malankara Metropolitan received more recognition than the power and authority of the previous Archdeacons' and Martoma's because the British Residents of Travancore were favourably disposed towards the Malankara Church.

In 1815, during Col. John Munro's time as the British Resident of Travancore, Pulikkottil Joseph Ittoop Ramban was ordained as a bishop by Geevarghese Mar Philoxenos II (Kidangan) (1811-1829) of Malabar Independent Syrian Church (Thozhyoor Church). He was given the episcopal title Dionysius II. After the death of Thoma VIII, he was named head of the Malankara Church by a Royal proclamation issued by the King of Travancore and later by the King of Cochin. This enabled him to dethrone Mar Thoma IX. The proclamation insisted that every Malankara Syrian Christian of Travancore-Cochin must obey the Malankara Metropolitan. From then onwards, the head of the Malankara Church was legally recognized as Malankara Metropolitan.

=== Reform movement and church splits ===
From 1816, Dionysius II, Dionysius III, Dionysius IV, and Mathews Athanasius succeeded the Malankara Metropolitans. Athanasius was inspired and encouraged by the Anglican missionaries at the old seminary in Kottayam, where Mathews Athanasius wanted to reform the traditional Syrian church. A parallel group under Dionysius V was working against his reformational schemes. Dionysius V invited and brought Ignatius Peter IV of Antioch to Malankara in 1875. The Patriarch divided the Malankara Church into seven dioceses; Dionysius V was declared the Malankara Metropolitan and was put in charge of the Quilon Diocese in the synod of Mulanthuruthy (27 to 30 June 1876). Neither the incumbent Metropolitan Mathews Athanasius nor the Churches favoring him participated in the synod.

A series of court cases followed thereafter. The Travancore Royal Court, by order on 14 July 1889, declared that Dionysius V was the rightful Malankara Metropolitan and Thomas Athanasius had no rights or claims to that office. The reformed faction separated and organized themselves as the independent Malankara Mar Thoma Syrian Church. The majority faction that preserved the Oriental Orthodox faith and came under the leadership of the new Malankara Metropolitan Dionysius V, under the spiritual guidance of the Patriarch of Antioch, is known as the Malankara Orthodox Syrian Church (Malankara Church).

In 1911, the church was divided into two factions due to internal disputes. Since then, the faction that supported the Patriarch of Antioch is known as the Bava Kakshi (Patriarch faction), while the Methran Kakshi (Malankara Metropolitan's faction) supported Vattasseril Thirumeni (bishop). In 1912, Methran Faction was ordained as the Catholicos of the East by Patriarch Ignatius Abded Mshiho II. After several years of litigation between the two factions, the Supreme Court of India declared that the Patriarch has no power in the Malankara Church, with his spiritual power reaching a vanishing point since the establishment of the Catholicate. This caused the Malankara Church to split again. The Patriarch faction under the Patriarch of Antioch still believes in the spiritual powers of the Patriarch and remains under the Catholicos of India, later established in 1975.

=== Electing Catholicos Geevarghese II as Malankara Metropolitan ===
After the death of Malankara Metropolitan Geevarghese Dionysius VI of Vattasseril (1934), the Malankara Association was held at M.D Seminary. Kottayam elected Catholicos Baselios Geevarghese II as the Malankara Metropolitan and passed a constitution for the Malankara Orthodox Syrian Church, popularly known as the 1934 constitution or Malankara Orthodox Syrian Church Constitution.

Since 1934, the Catholicos of the East has held the Office of Malankara Metropolitan.

=== Malankara Association 2002 at Parumala ===
According to the Supreme Court order, the Malankara Syrian Christian Association (Parliament of the Malankara Church) was held, under the observation of the Supreme Court of India, to set right the position of Malankara Metropolitan Catholicos Baselios Mar Thoma Mathews II.

The Association Meeting was held on 20 March 2002 at Parumala Seminary, and Baselios Mar Thoma Mathews II was elected as the Malankara Metropolitan. A secret ballot voting was conducted at the seminary, and the Supreme Court Observer Justice V.S. Mulimud declared the result. The total polling was 3,483 votes. Out of these, 3,464 votes were cast in favor of Baselios Mathews II, 10 voted against, and 9 were invalid. The total number of delegates registered for the association was 3,528. "The Supreme Court has unambiguously approved the supreme authority of the Malankara Syrian Christian Association. The factions no longer exist, and there is only one official Malankara Church." The election was held after the Supreme Court's 1995 judgment on the dispute in the Malankara Church.

This meeting was boycotted by the Patriarch faction, which was unhappy with its overall conduct.

== Thronal cathedral ==
From 1653 to 1815, the See of Malankara Metropolitan was located at individual churches of the incumbent's preference. These include Niranam Church, Kandanad Church, Kadampanad Church, and others, at various times during that period. With the establishment of the Orthodox Theological Seminary in Kottayam in 1815, the headquarters of the Malankara Metropolitan was relocated to Kottayam, while the thronal cathedral was also relocated to Kottayam Cheriapally, the most prominent church in Kottayam at the time. Since then, Kottayam Cheriapally has remained the thronal cathedral of Malankara Metropolitans.

== Headquarters ==
Similar to the thronal cathedral, the headquarters of the Malankara Metropolitan was also located at individual churches of the incumbent's preference from 1653 to 1815. With the establishment of the Orthodox Theological Seminary, Kottayam in 1815, the headquarters was permanently relocated to the Seminary.

== See also ==
- List of Malankara metropolitans
- Saint Thomas Christians
- Syro-Malabar Church

== Sources ==
- Frykenberg, Robert Eric (2008). Christianity in India: From Beginnings to the Present. Oxford: Oxford University Press. ISBN 9780198263777.
- Chronicles of Malabar
