= Pakalomattam family =

St Thomas Christian family

The Pakalomattam family is an ancient Saint Thomas Christian family in Kerala, India. According to an article written by P. J. Thomas, Parakunnel, a member of the Parakkunnel-Pakalomattom family, in Royal Asiatic Society of Great Britain and Ireland, the family "solely supplied bishops and archdeacons to the Church in India till the beginning of the nineteenth century." The position of Archdeacon of All India (sometimes given as Arkkadiyakon of all India), who oversaw the whole Christian church in India, was with very few exceptions filled by a member of the Pakalomattam family for generations.

== History ==
The Pakalomattam family originated from Brahmins who were brought into the Christian faith by Saint Thomas the Apostle in AD 52. Pakalomattam was one of the four Brahmin families converted by Saint Thomas the Apostle, the other three being Sankarapuri, Kalli, and Kaliyankal. These four families formed the foundation of the early Saint Thomas Christians in Kerala and held a distinguished position among the Marthoma Nasranis.

Pakalomattam was the principal priestly family among the Saint Thomas Christians. Traditionally, the eldest priest of the Pakalomattam family held the office of Archdeacon of All India, the highest native ecclesiastical office among the Saint Thomas Christians. The Archdeacon headed the native clergy and served as the principal ecclesiastical authority of the Christian community in India. The position of Archdeacon was the highest clerical rank in the Church of the East after that of a bishop.

Since India was an exterior province of the Church of the East and the Patriarch reserved the right to appoint Metropolitans to India, the native Archdeacon exercised the effective ecclesiastical authority over the Saint Thomas Christian community. The Archdeaconate was not merely an ecclesiastical institution but also carried considerable socio-political and ethno-religious authority, representing the integrity of the Christian community of Hendo (India).

The Pakalomattam Tharavad was initially at Palayoor in Thrissur district, but later moved to Kuravilangad in the 4th century. From the 17th century onward, many branches of the Pakalomattam family moved to different parts of Kerala, following the division of the Saint Thomas Christian community between the Puthenkoor and Pazhayakoor factions.

Following the Coonan Cross Oath of 1653, members of the Pakalomattam family continued to occupy prominent ecclesiastical positions, including that of Malankara Metropolitan, which headed the Puthenkoor faction from AD 1653 until AD 1816.

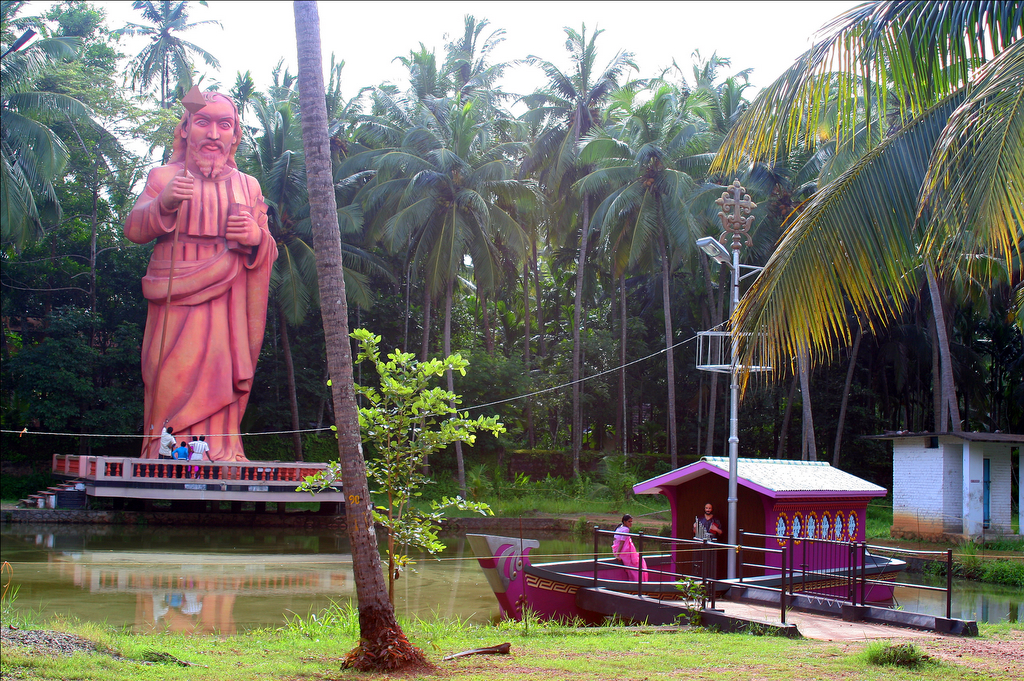
Statue of St. Thomas

== The legend ==
Palayoor in Thrissur district was one of the places near the port of Muziris, where St. Thomas established a church. The place is referred to as Paloor in old documents. At that time, according to tradition, Palayoor had a Brahmin village of families with the strength of 64 adults. In one of the temple ponds in Palayoor, St. Thomas performed a miracle, where the Brahmins of the village were performing a Vedic ritual called Tharpanam which means "The offering which satisfies" in which they perform a ritual of the Sun by the symbolic submission of water in their palms along with Vedic recitation. St. Thomas was attracted to the ritual and queried about the act and challenged the logic of their submission, since the water that was thrown above was not accepted, and returned to earth. St. Thomas used this opportunity to present his subject before the present Brahmin community. St. Thomas threw water in the name of Jesus and it stood still in the air and glittered like a diamond. By this experience, many Brahmins accepted Christianity while the other Brahmins cursed and left the place with their families, saying that they would do their rituals from then on at Vembanattu.

== See also ==
- Thoma I
- Jacob of Muttuchira
- Thoma of Villarvattom
