= Malankara Church =

Historic Indian Christian denomination

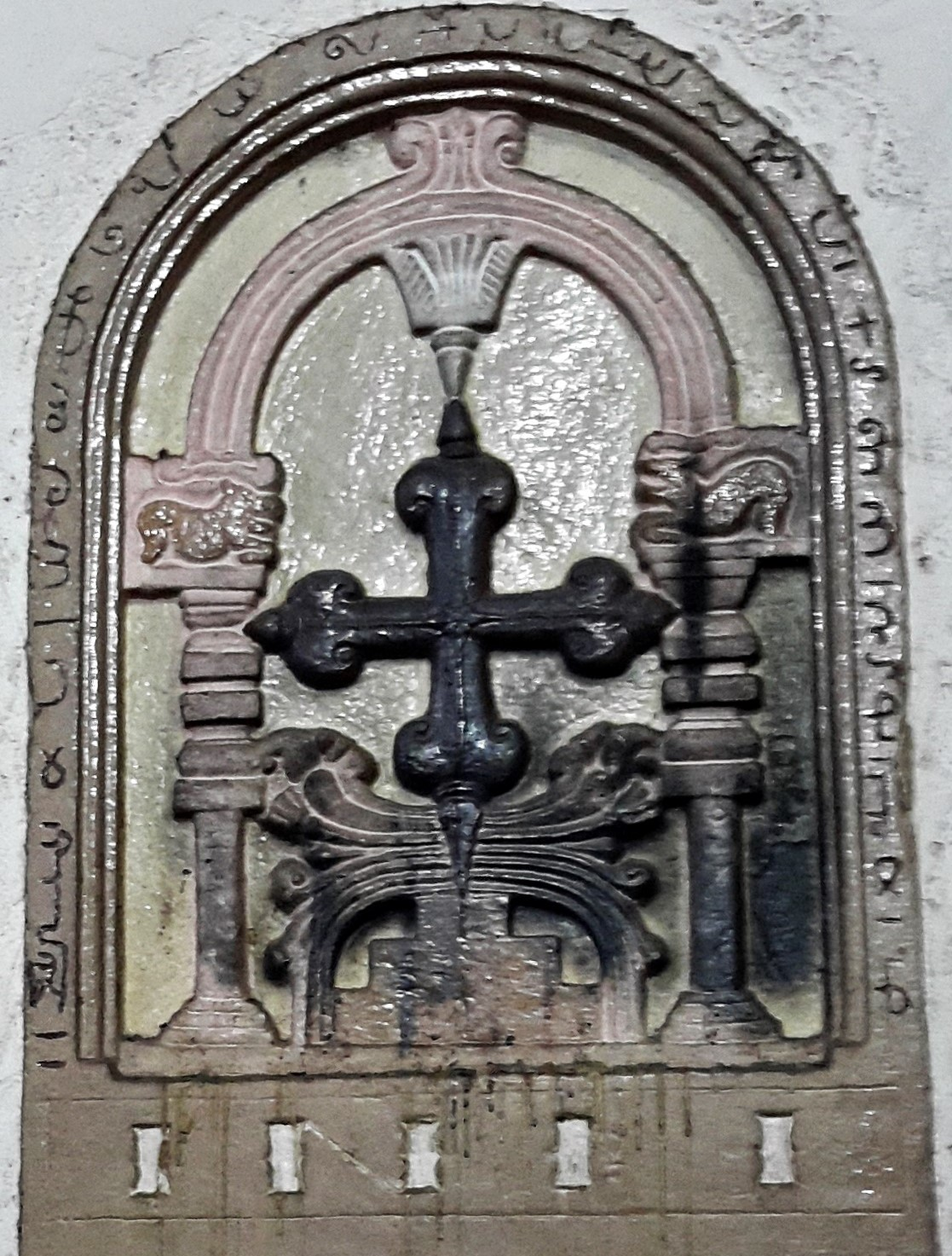
Malankara Church
- Type: Eastern Christian
- Classification: Oriental Orthodox
- Theology: Miaphysitism
- Polity: Episcopal
- Metropolitan Bishop: Malankara Metropolitan
- Sub-divisions: Jacobite Syrian Christian Church, Malankara Orthodox Syrian Church, Syro-Malankara Catholic Church, Malabar Independent Syrian Church, Mar Thoma Syrian Church
- Region: Kerala, India
- Language: Suriyani Malayalam, Classical Syriac, Malayalam
- Liturgy: Antiochian Rite- Liturgy of Saint James
- Headquarters: Pazhaya Seminary
- Founder: Thomas the Apostle as per tradition.
- Origin: 52 AD (tradition); 1665
- Separated from: Church of the East
- Branched from: Saint Thomas Christians
- Merged into: Syriac Orthodox Church

The Malankara Church, also known as Malankara Syrian Church, was the unified body of Puthankur Saint Thomas Christians who claim origins from the missions of Thomas the Apostle. This was the earlier name of the Malabar Church before the split with Coonan Croos Oath.

The Coonan Cross oath was taken by a large section of the Saint Thomas Christian community in protest against Portuguese ecclesiastical domination under the Padroado system, particularly following the Latinizing measures imposed after the Synod of Diamper. The resistance was directed mainly against foreign control and the suppression of their East Syriac traditions rather than against Catholic doctrine itself.

Under the leadership of Archdeacon Thoma, later known as Thoma I, Saint Thomas Christians sought to preserve its autonomy and apostolic heritage. The Carmelite missionaries later attempted reconciliation with Rome, resulting in many returning to the Catholic communion. The protested faction eventually established ties with the Syriac Orthodox Patriarch of Antioch in 1665, adopting the West Syriac liturgical and ecclesiastical tradition. This development shaped what later became known as the Malankara Syrian Church or Puthenkoor Syrians

Over time, the Malankara Church experienced internal disputes regarding authority, theology, and relations with the Syriac Orthodox Patriarch of Antioch, leading to successive divisions. These divisions eventually gave rise to several present-day churches, including the Jacobite Syrian Christian Church, Malankara Orthodox Syrian Church, Malankara Mar Thoma Syrian Church, Malabar Independent Syrian Church, Syro-Malankara Catholic Church, the Saint Thomas Anglicans of the Church of South India and the St. Thomas Evangelical Church of India.

== Early history of Christianity in India ==
=== Ecclesiastical Communion ===
Historically, Malabar traded frequently with the nations of the Middle East, and traders from Egypt, Persia, and the Levant frequently visited Malabar for spices. These groups included Arabs, Jews and also Christians, and the Christians who visited here maintained contact with the Malankara Church. As such the Church in India was in ecclesiastical communion with the Church of the East, otherwise called the Persian church. The Malankara Church was headed by a Metropolitan consecrated from the Persian Church and ordinary administration of the Church was vested upon a local, dynastic archdeacon, who was referred to as the Head of the Malankara Christian community. (Archdeacon is the highest rank for a cleric in the Church of the East after the rank of bishop.)

=== Cheppeds: Collection of deeds on copper plates ===
The Rulers of Kerala, in appreciation for their assistance, gave to the Malankara Nazranis, three deeds on copper plates. They gave the Nasranis various rights and privileges which were written on copper plates. These are known as Cheppeds, Royal Grants, Sasanam etc.

- Thomas of Cana copper plates: Dated between 345 and 811 AD, Thomas of Cana (Knai Thoma), a merchant from Persian Mesopotamia, was granted a deed of socio-economic rights known today as the Thomas of Cana copper plates by the Chera Dynasty. Thoma's plates were recorded and translated in the 16th and 17th century by Portuguese officials. The plates are later noted to have disappeared while in the possession of the Portuguese and remain lost.
- Tharissa palli Deed I: In 849 AD, Perumal Sthanu Ravi Gupta (844–885) gave a deed to Isodatta Virai for Tharissa Palli (church) at Curakkeni Kollam. According to historians, this is the first deed in Kerala that gives the exact date.
- Tharissa palli Deed II: Continuation of the above, given after 849 AD.
- Iravi Corttan Deed: In 1225 AD, Sri Vira Raghava Chakravarti gave a deed to Iravi Corttan (Eravi Karthan) of Mahadevarpattanam in 774. Two Brahmin families are witness to this deed showing that Brahmins were in Kerala by the 8th century.

These plates detail privileges awarded to the community by the then rulers. These influenced the development of the social structure in Kerala and privileges, rules for the communities. These are considered as one of the most important legal documents in the history of Kerala. Three of these are still in the Orthodox Theological Seminary (Old Seminary) in Kottayam and two are at the Mar Thoma Church Headquarters in Tiruvalla.

=== Archdeacons ===
The position of archdeacon—the highest for clergy who are not a bishop—had great importance in the church of India in the centuries leading up to the formation of an independent Malankara Church. Though technically subordinate to the metropolitan, the archdeacon wielded great ecclesiastical and secular power, to the extent that he was considered the secular leader of the community and served as effective head of the Indian Church in times when the province was absent a bishop. Unlike the metropolitan, who was evidently always an East Syriac sent by the patriarch, the archdeacon was a native Saint Thomas Christian. In the documented period, the position was evidently hereditary, belonging to the Pakalomattam family, who claimed a privileged connection to Thomas the Apostle.

Details on the archidiaconate prior to the arrival of the Portuguese are elusive, but Patriarch Timothy I (780–823) called the Archdeacon of India the "head of the faithful in India", implying an elevated status by at least that time. In the recorded period of its history, the office of archdeacon was substantially different in India than in the rest of the Church of the East or other Christian churches. In the broader Church of the East, each bishop was attended by an archdeacon, but in India, there was only ever one archdeacon, even when the province had multiple bishops serving it.

Following the collapse of the Church of the East's hierarchy in most of Asia in the 14th century, India was effectively cut off from the church's heartland in Mesopotamia and formal contact was severed. By the late 15th century India had had no metropolitan for several generations, and the authority traditionally associated with him had been vested in the archdeacon. In 1491, the archdeacon sent envoys to the Patriarch of the Church of the East, as well as to the Coptic Pope of Alexandria and to the Syriac Orthodox Patriarch of Antioch, requesting a new bishop for India. The Patriarch of the Church of the East Shemʿon IV Basidi responded by consecrating two bishops, Thoma and Yuhanon, and dispatching them to India. These bishops helped rebuild the ecclesiastical infrastructure and reestablish fraternal ties with the patriarchate, but the years of separation had greatly affected the structure of the Indian church. Though receiving utmost respect, the metropolitan was treated as the spiritual authority in his own diocese; the Archdeacon was firmly established as the real power in the Malankara community.

=== Arrival of the Portuguese ===
At the time the Portuguese arrived in India in 1498, the Saint Thomas Christians were in a difficult position. Though prosperous owing to their large stake in the spice trade and protected by a formidable militia, the tumultuous political climate of the time had placed the small community under pressure from the forces of the powerful rajas of Calicut, Cochin, and the various smaller kingdoms in the area. When the Portuguese under Vasco da Gama arrived on the South Indian coast, the leaders of the Saint Thomas community greeted them and proffered a formal alliance to their fellow Christians. The Portuguese, who had keen interest in implanting themselves in the spice trade and in expanding the domain of their bellicose form of Christianity, jumped at this opportunity.

The Portuguese brought to India a particularly militant brand of Christianity, the product of several centuries of struggle during the Reconquista, which they hoped to spread across the world. Facilitating this objective was the Padroado Real, a series of treaties and decrees in which the Pope conferred upon the Portuguese government certain authority in ecclesiastical matters in the foreign territories they conquered. Upon reaching India the Portuguese quickly ensconced themselves in Goa and established a church hierarchy; soon they set themselves to bringing the native Christians under their dominion. Towards this goal, the colonial establishment felt it necessary to conduct the Saint Thomas Christians fully into the Latin Church, both in bringing them into conformity with Latin church customs and in subjecting them to the authority of the Archbishop of Goa.

Following the death of Metropolitan Mar Jacob in 1552, the Portuguese became more aggressive in their efforts to subjugate the Saint Thomas Christians. Protests on the part of the natives were frustrated by events back in the Church of the East's Mesopotamian heartland, which left them devoid of consistent leadership. In 1552, the year of Jacob's death, a schism in the Church of the East resulted in there being two rival patriarchates, one of which entered into communion with the Catholic Church, and the other of which remained independent. At different times both patriarchs sent bishops to India, but the Portuguese were consistently able to outmaneuver the newcomers or else convert them to Latin Catholicism outright. In 1575 the Padroado declared that neither patriarch could appoint prelates to the community without Portuguese consent, thereby cutting the Thomas Christians off from their hierarchy.

By 1599 the last Metropolitan, Abraham, had died, and the Archbishop of Goa, Aleixo de Menezes, had secured the submission of the young Archdeacon George, the highest remaining representative of the native church hierarchy. That year, Menezes convened the Synod of Diamper, which instituted a number of structural and liturgical reforms to the Indian church. At the synod, the parishes were brought directly under the Archbishop's authority, certain "superstitious" customs were anathematized, and the traditional variant of the East Syriac Rite, was purged of elements unacceptable by the Latin standards. Though the Saint Thomas Christians were now formally part of the Catholic Church, the conduct of the Portuguese over the next decades fueled resentment in parts of the community, ultimately leading to open resistance.

== Coonan Cross and the independent church ==
Over the next several decades, tensions seethed between the Latin prelates and what remained of the native hierarchy. This came to a head in 1641 with the ascension of two new protagonists on either side of the contention: Francis Garcia, the new Archbishop of Kodungalloor, and Archdeacon Thomas, the nephew and successor to Archdeacon George. In 1652, the escalating situation was further complicated by the arrival in India of a mysterious figure named Ahatallah.

Ahatallah arrived in Mylapore in 1652, claiming to be a Patriarch of Antioch. Ahatallah's true biography is obscure, but some details have been established. He appears to have been a Syriac Orthodox Bishop of Damascus and may have at one point entered into communion with Rome. He then returned to Syria in order to bring the Syriac Orthodox Patriarch Ignatius Hidayat Allah into communion with Rome. He had not accomplished this by the time Hidayat Allah died in 1639, after which point Ahatallah began claiming he was Hidayat Allah's rightful successor. In 1646, he was in Egypt at the court of the Coptic Pope Mark VI, who dispatched him to India in 1652, evidently in response to a request for aid from Archdeacon Thomas. Reckoning him an impostor, the Portuguese arrested him, but allowed him to meet with members of the Saint Thomas Christian clergy, whom he impressed greatly. The Portuguese put him on a ship bound for Cochin and Goa, and Archdeacon Thomas led his militia to Cochin demanding to meet with the Patriarch. The Portuguese refused, asserting that he was a dangerous invader and that the ship had already sailed on to Goa.

Ahatallah was never heard from again in India, and rumours soon spread that Archbishop Garcia had disposed of him before he ever reached Goa. Contemporary accounts allege that he was drowned in Cochin harbour, or even that the Portuguese burned him at the stake. In reality, it appears that Ahatallah did in fact reach Goa, whence he was sent on to Europe, but evidently died in Paris before reaching Rome, where his case was to be heard. In any event, Garcia's dismissive response to the Saint Thomas Christians' appeals only embittered the community further.

This was the last straw for the Saint Thomas Christians, and in 1653, Thomas and representatives of the community met at the Church of Our Lady in Mattancherry to take bold action. In a great ceremony before a crucifix and lighted candles, they swore a solemn oath that they would never obey Garcia or the Portuguese again, and that they accepted only the Archdeacon as their shepherd. The Malankara Church and all its successor churches regard this declaration, known as the Coonan Cross Oath.

=== Later development ===
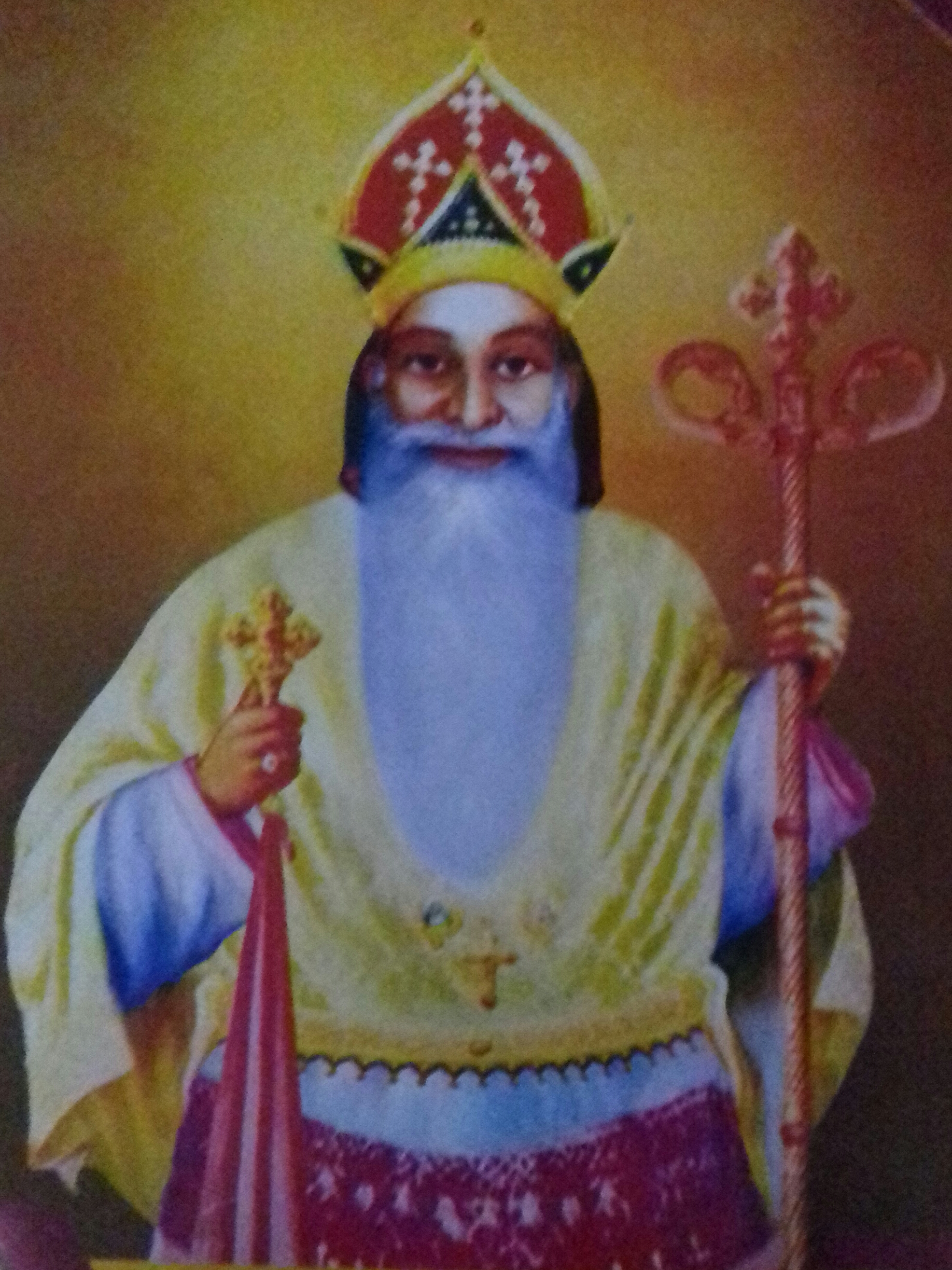
Thoma III, 3rd Malankara Metropolitan

The resistance to Portuguese ecclesiastical authority resulted in a formal rupture within the Saint Thomas Christian community. The first solemn protest took place in 1653, known as the Coonan Kurishu Satyam (Coonan Cross Oath). Under the leadership of Archdeacon Thoma, the St. Thomas Christians publicly took an oath in Mattancherry, Cochin that they would not obey the Portuguese Catholic bishops and the Jesuit missionaries. Unfortunately, there was no Metropolitan present in the Malankara Church at that time. In the absence of a bishop sympathetic to their cause, Archdeacon Thomas was in 1653 elevated to episcopal status by the laying on of hands of twelve priests at Alangad, taking the name Thoma I. This consecration was later questioned on canonical grounds by the Catholic faction.

Pope Alexander VII sent the Syrian bishop Joseph Sebastiani at the head of a Carmelite delegation who succeeded in convincing the majority of Saint Thomas Christians, including Palliveettil Chandy Kathanar and Kadavil Chandy Kathanar. The Catholic faction constantly challenged the legitimacy of the consecration of the archdeacon as Metropolitan by priests. This faction was led by Palliveettil Chandy, cousin of Thoma I, who was consecrated as a bishop in 1663 by Carmelite missionaries of the Catholic Church. He was supported by other prominent Saint Thomas Christian leaders including Kadavil Chandy Kathanar and Vengūr Givargis Kathanar. This made it essential to rectify the illegitimacy of the consecration of Archdeacon as Metropolitan. Episcopal consecration of Thoma I as a bishop was regularized in 1665 by Gregorios Abdal Jaleel Jerusalem Bishop of the Syriac Orthodox Church. This led to the first permanent split in the Saint Thomas Christian community. Thereafter, the faction affiliated with the Catholic Church under Parambil Mar Chandy was designated the Pazhayakoottukar, or "Old Allegiance", while the branch affiliated with Mar Thoma was called the Puthenkoottukar, or "New Allegiance".

Thoma I with 32 churches (out of a total of 116) and their congregations were the body from which the Malankara Syrian Puthenkūr Churches originated. In 1665, Gregorios Abdul Jaleel, a bishop sent by the Syriac Orthodox Patriarch of Antioch, arrived in India, and the Saint Thomas Christians under the leadership of the Archdeacon welcomed him. The Gregorios Abdal Jaleel regularised the consecration of Archdeacon as Metropolitan of the Syriac Orthodox Church as per the apostolic standards of Kaiveppu (traditional legitimate way of laying hands by a valid Bishop). The 18th century saw the gradual introduction of West Syriac liturgy and script to the Malabar Coast, a process that continued through the 19th century.

== The Syriac Orthodox Communion ==
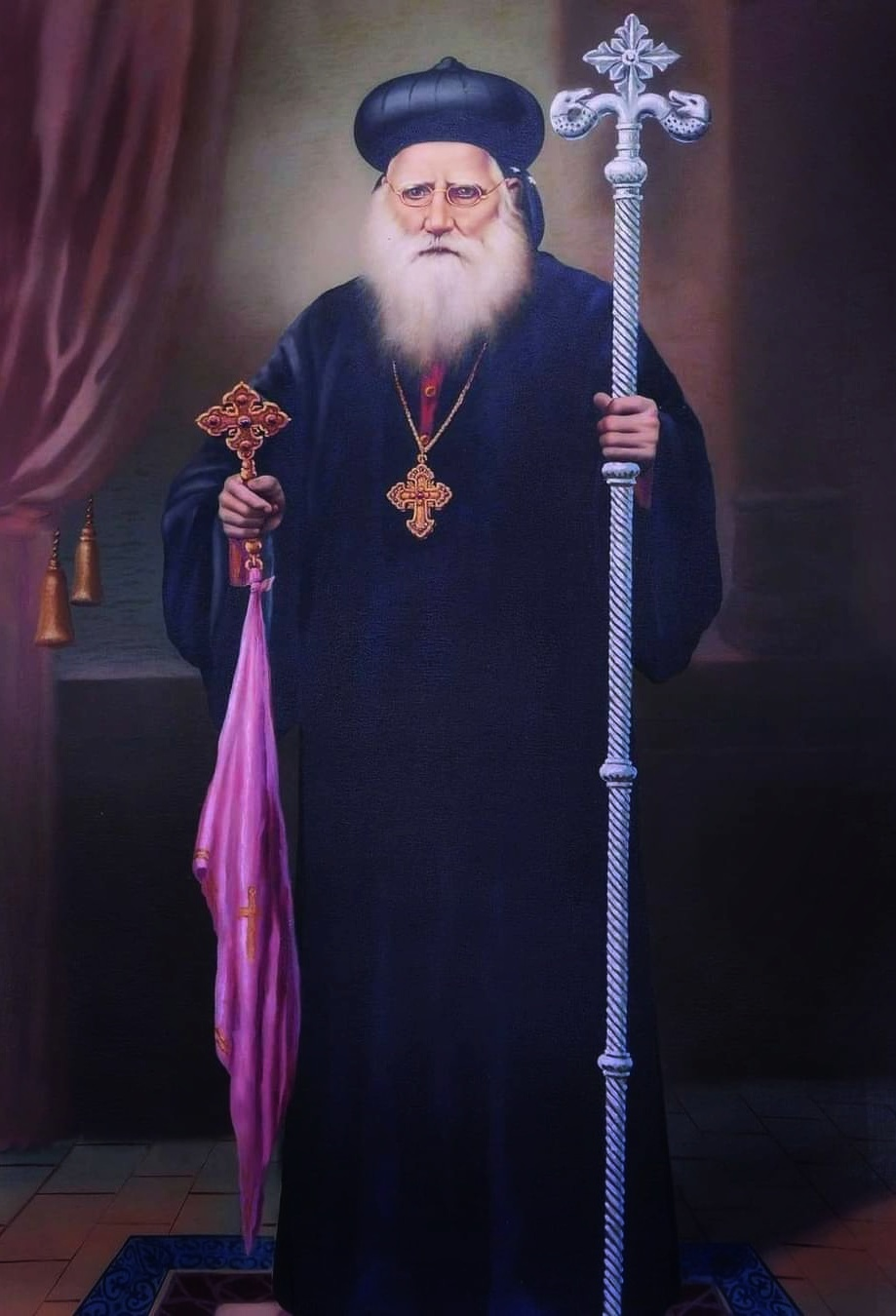
Mor Osthatheos Sleebo

The arrival of Mar Gregorios in 1665, marked the introduction of Oriental Orthodoxy in India through the Malankara Church and valid bishopric of Syriac Orthodox Church in India.

Letter of Patriarch Ignatios Abdal-Masih I to the faithful of Malabar

After greeting you with a holy kiss, let that, which we are relating to each one of you, be known to you, o brethren, my beloved, namely that the apostolate to you of Gregorios, that is, the venerable Abdal-Jaleel, was from the divine Providence, because you were not able to appoint and to consecrate for yourselves venerable bishops. Afterwards, you were in need and have already sent three times [envoys to us]. And we yielded [to your request] out of the love of Christ, and have sent to you our Fathers, our Father Mor Baselios, that is, Patriarch Yaldo, together with those who accompany him, not in order that he stays with you, but in order to fill your need and to consecrate for you venerable [bishops] and metropolitans. And after having fulfilled your requests, send them back to us. We do not want him to come to us after a long period, but after three years.

— MS Samanvaya Syr 18

Letter from Dionysious Punnathara (a nineteenth century prelate of the Malankara Syrian Church) addressed to the head of the Anglican Church Missionary Society, as translated from the Syriac original:

In the Name of the Eternal and Necessary Existence, the Almighty.
Mar Dionysius, Metropolitan of the Jacobite-Syrians in Malabar, subject to the authority of our Father, Mar Ignatius, Patriarch, who presides in the Apostolic See of Antioch of Syria, beloved of the Messiah. Love from Christ, and from the People of all the Churches, to Lord Gambier, the illustrious, honour able, and renowned President...
We, who are called Syrian-Jacobites, and reside in the land of Malabar, even from the times of Mar Thomas, the holy Apostle, until the wall of Cochin was taken in the reign of King Purgis, kept the True Faith according to the manner of the Syrian Jacobites, of real glory, without division or confusion. But, by the power of the Franks, our Jacobite Syrian Fathers and Leaders were prohibited from coming from Antioch: and, because we had no Leader and Head, we were like Sheep without a Shepherd; or, like Orphans and Widows, oppressed in spirit, without support or help.
In the year of our Lord 1653, came our Spiritual Father, Mar Ignatius, the Patriarch, from Antioch to Malabar....
Again, in the year of our Lord 1753, came to us some holy Jacobite Syrian Fathers from Antioch, who turned us to our true ancient faith, and set up a High Priest for us.

In 1912, a Catholicate was instituted in Malankara by the Syriac Orthodox Patriarch Abdul Masih, thereby starting a century of legal proceedings between factions of the church which supported the Catholicate, and those who opposed it on behalf of the claims that the Abdul Masih was excommunicated. Later, the Syriac Orthodox Church established the office of Canonical Maphrianate of the East in India (now known as the Catholicos of India) of the Jacobite Syriac Orthodox Church.

== Further history ==
History of the Saint Thomas Christians' divisions

In 1665, Gregorios Abdul Jaleel, sent from Patriarch Ignatius Abdulmasih I, introduced West Syriac Rite in India. By 1809, the Jacobite Syrians fully incorporated the Antiochian Syriac Rite liturgy after the assembly of parish representatives met at Kandanad, Kerala and resolved to fully implement the move to West Syriac Rite through the declaration Kandanad Padiyola, which had been already partially implemented by the same assembly in 1789 at Puthiyacavu.

The church of Saint Thomas Christians constituted a single church until the 16th century. It formed the community of the East Syriac ecclesiastical province of India. This Church formed the ecclesiastical Province of India within the broader East Syriac Christian world and enjoyed considerable autonomy in its internal administration.

The arrival of the Portuguese in the sixteenth century introduced a new phase in the Church's history. Through the Synod of Diamper, the local Church was brought into full and explicit communion with the Apostolic See of Rome under the authority of the Roman Catholic Church. While the implementation of Latin disciplinary norms created tensions and led to certain disruptions in traditional practices, the communion with Rome was understood as a reaffirmation of Catholic unity rather than a break in apostolic continuity.

The Coonan Cross Oath of 1653 emerged amid administrative dissatisfaction and disputes over ecclesiastical governance, not as a rejection of Catholic doctrine itself. In response, Rome sent Carmelite missionaries to restore order and regular canonical structures. Over time, the majority of Saint Thomas Christians reaffirmed their communion with Rome, forming what came to be known as the Paḻayakūr (Old Allegiance). This community constitutes the historical foundation of the Syro-Malabar Church.

A minority faction, seeking episcopal leadership outside Roman jurisdiction, aligned with the Syriac Orthodox Patriarchate in 1665 through the arrival of Gregorios Abdul Jaleel. This resulted in the gradual adoption of the West Syriac liturgical tradition and Miaphysite theological orientation among that group, forming the Puthenkūr (New Allegiance). This marked a significant liturgical and theological shift away from the East Syriac heritage that had historically characterized the Saint Thomas Christian Church.

The Syro-Malabar Church, by contrast, preserved the East Syriac liturgical and spiritual patrimony that had shaped the Saint Thomas Christian tradition for centuries, while maintaining full communion with the Apostolic See of Rome. Although the colonial period introduced certain Latin administrative and devotional influences, these did not fundamentally alter its East Syriac identity. From the nineteenth century onward, and especially in the twentieth century, sustained and deliberate efforts were undertaken to restore the authentic East Syriac liturgical tradition in fidelity to its historical roots.

At the same time, the Chaldean Syrian Church, in communion with the Assyrian Church of the East, also preserves the East Syriac liturgical heritage in India and represents another continuation of that historic tradition outside Roman communion.

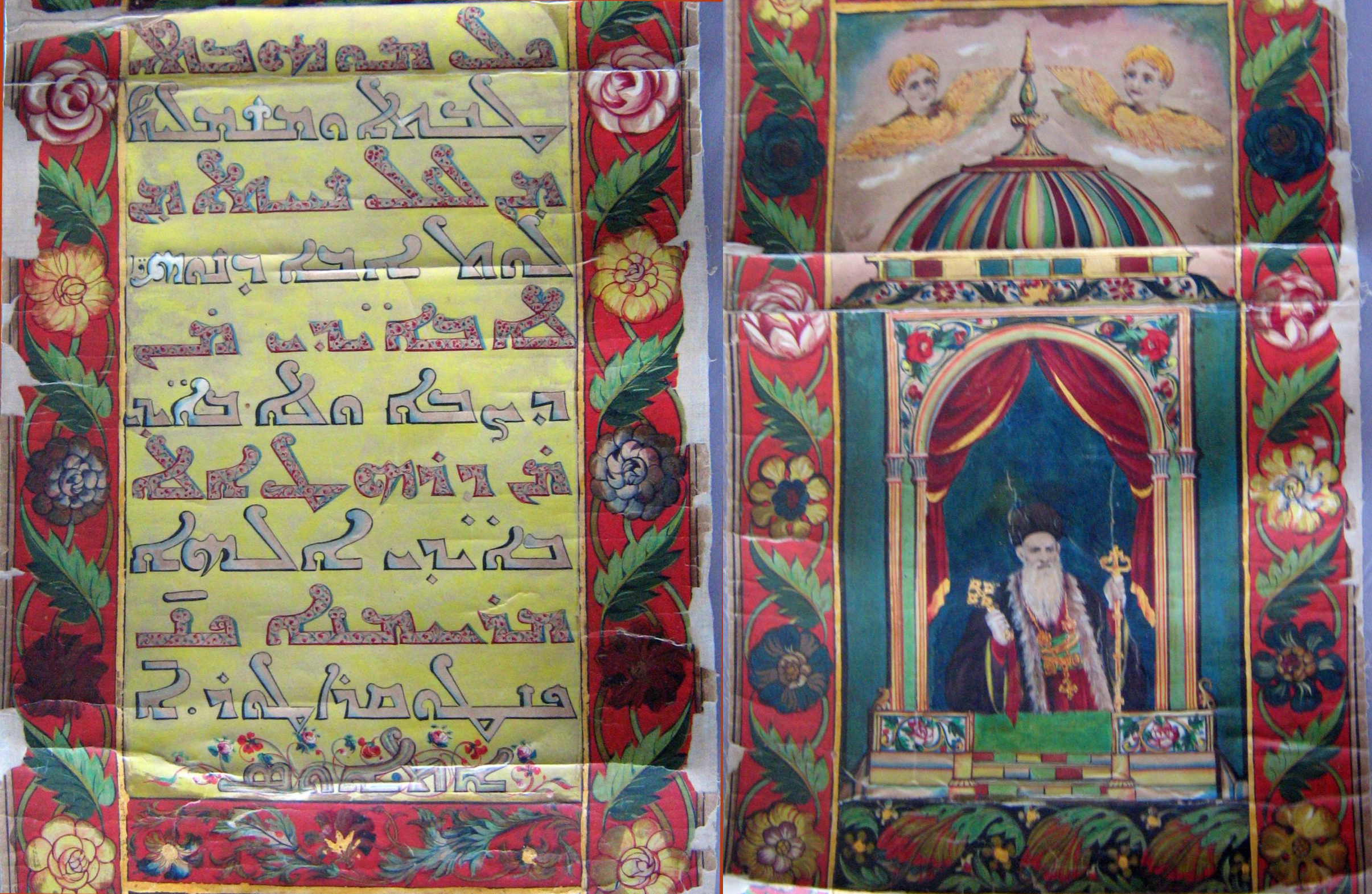
Sthathicon of Kadavil Paulose Mar Athanasius, 1877

=== Disputes and Court Cases ===
Later, a number of splits happened among the Jacobite Syrians due to the influence of foreign missionaries and internal conflicts. In 1772, Baselios Shakrallah, a Syriac Orthodox maphrian, consecrated Kattumangatt Abraham Mar Koorilos as the Metropolitan against Dionysius I. Abraham Mar Koorilos I led the faction that eventually became the Malabar Independent Syrian Church.

From 1816 onwards, the Anglican Church Mission Society missionaries helped the Malankara Church, through their Help Mission. But on 16 January 1836, Metropolitan Dionysius IV of Cheppad, convened a Synod at Mavelikara, in protest against the interference of Anglicans in the affairs of the Malankara Church. There it was declared that Malankara Church would be subject to Syrian traditions and the Syriac Orthodox Patriarch of Antioch. The declaration resulted in the separation of the CMS missionaries from the communion with the Malankara Church. However, a minority from the Malankara Church, who were in favour of the Reformed ideologies of the missionaries, stood along with them and joined the Anglican Church. These Saint Thomas Anglicans became part of the Church of South India, after the Indian independence in 1947. So they are also called CSI Syrian Christians.

In the 19th century, a reform movement inspired by British missionaries led to the formation of the independent Mar Thoma Syrian Church under the leadership of the then Malankara Metropolitan, Mathews Mar Athanasius. Meanwhile, the majority of the members of the church, resisted the movement and strengthened their affiliation to the Syriac Orthodox Church of Antioch at the Mulanthuruthy Synod in 1876. They were led by Pulikkootil Joseph Mar Dionysios, who was consecrated by Patriarch Ignatius Peter III. In 1875, Patriarch Ignatius Peter IV excommunicated Mathews Athanasius, Thomas Athanasius and their followers from the Malankara Church. The British colonial administration abstained from extending their crucial endorsement to any one faction, thereby disengaging themselves from local church matters. Thus, the rival parties had to settle their disputes, entirely by means of court litigations.

Dionysious V and his supporters filed a case on 4 March 1879. (Case O.S. No. 439 of 1054) demanding the possession of the seminary and the control of assets of the Church. Thomas Athanasius was then the Metropolitan.

During the course of this litigation (1879–1889), answering a question Thomas Athanasius Metropolitan said,

The Episcopal throne of Patriarch is the throne of St. Peter, while the throne of Malankara Church is that of St. Thomas. Malankara Church is as old as the Church in Antioch, equal in status, and both are independent.

A meeting was convened by the Maharaja of Travancore, before the final verdict was given, Athanasius testified that,

Malankara Church was never under any foreign rule and that he was unwilling to move away from the teachings or give the authority and the Church possessions to a foreign Patriarch.

The final verdict which came on 12 July 1889 from the Royal Court of Travancore, upheld the conservative position on the Syriac Orthodox Patriarchate of Antioch, as being the only competent ecclesiastical authority historically authorized to ordain and appoint bishops to the Malankara Metropolitan. The ruling declared Dionysious V the rightful Malankara Metropolitan owing to the acceptance by the vast majority of Malankara Christians and appointment by Syriac Orthodox Patriarchate of Antioch wherefrom he received direct consecration. The judgement also dismissed all claims of the reformists and their leader Thomas Athanasius to the Metropolitanate or its assets. They separated and established the Reformed Mar Thoma Syrian Church. In the 1950s, a faction that demanded further conformity to Protestant doctrines, surfaced within the Mar Thoma Syrian Church. In 1961, they split and formed the St. Thomas Evangelical Church of India.

However this church underwent a further split in 1912 due to internal disputes and the question of autonomy. The faction that supported the Patriarch of Antioch was known as Bava Kakshi (Patriarch faction), and those who supported the Malankara Metropolitan came to be called Methran Kakshi (bishop faction). The former came to be known as the Jacobite Syrian Christian Church, which was incorporated into an arch-diocese of the Syriac Orthodox Church later, and the latter, initially known as the Malankara Yakkobaya Orthodox Syrian Church, which adopted the name of the Malankara Orthodox Syrian Church. On 3 July 2017, the Supreme Court of India passed a judgement in favour of the Malankara Orthodox Syrian Church on the question of who is the legitimate Malankara Metropolitan and who has the authority to manage the affairs of the Malankara Church and its properties. It equivocally declared the 1934 Constitution of the Malankara Church a valid document to administer the church and ended the legal dispute among the two factions.

== Modern descendants ==
The modern-day descendants of the Malankara Church are:

1. Malankara Orthodox Syrian Church (MOSC): an Autocephalous Oriental Orthodox Church. headed by the Catholicos of the East and Malankara Metropolitan enthroned on the apostolic throne of Saint Thomas.
2. Jacobite Syrian Christian Church (JSCC) or Malankara Jacobite Syrian Orthodox Church: the Indian branch of the Syriac Orthodox Church under the local jurisdiction of a maphrian (catholicos) titled the Catholicos of India and Malankara Metropolitan.
3. Syro-Malankara Catholic Church or the Malankara Syrian Catholic Church: an autonomous sui iuris Eastern Catholic particular church, in full communion with the Holy See and the worldwide Catholic Church, with self-governance under the CCEO.
4. Malankara Mar Thoma Syrian Church (MTC): an Independent and Autonomous Oriental Protestant Malankara church under the jurisdiction of the Marthoma Metropolitan, seated on the Apostolic Throne of Saint Thomas the apostle. The Church is in full communion with the Church of England and its communion.
5. Malabar Independent Syrian Church: an Independent and Autocephalous church under the jurisdiction of its Thozhiyur Metropolitan, also in communion with the Mar Thoma Church.
6. St. Thomas Evangelical Church of India: an autonomous Eastern, Evangelical and Episcopal church, headed by a presiding bishop.
7. Saint Thomas Anglicans: community of former Malankara Syrian Christians who belong to the Anglican Communion, as members of the Church of South India. The CSI is in full communion with the Mar Thoma Syrian Church.

== Gallery ==
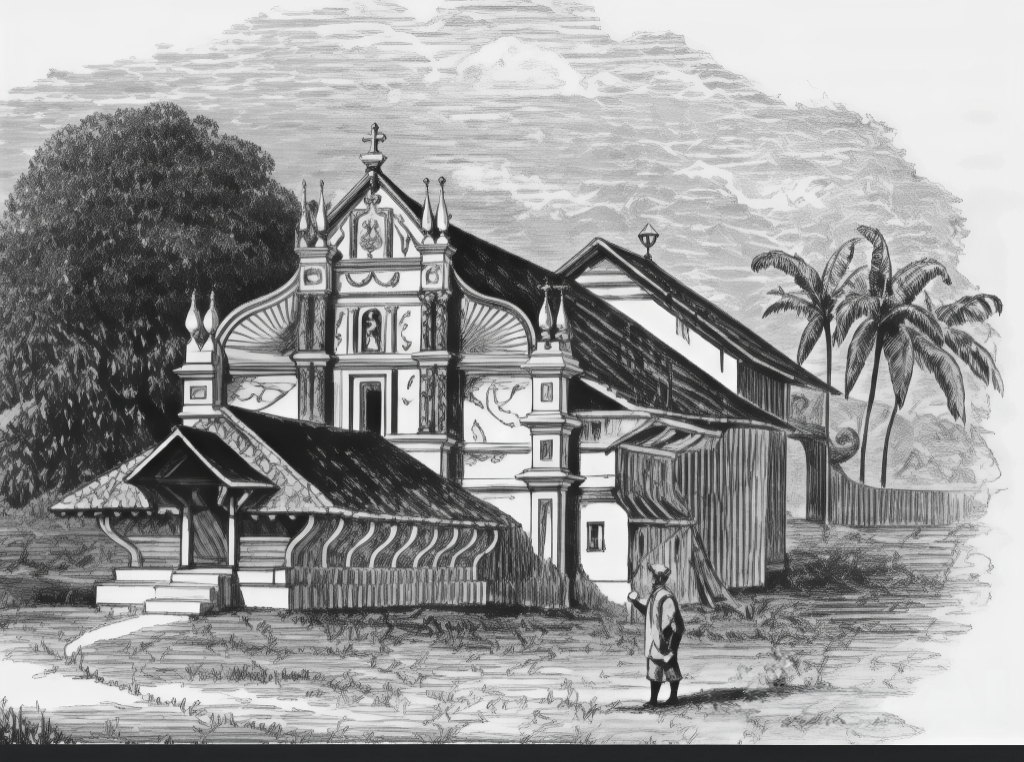
Old Karingachira Church which was seen by Anglican Missionary Dr. Claudius Buchanan in 1806

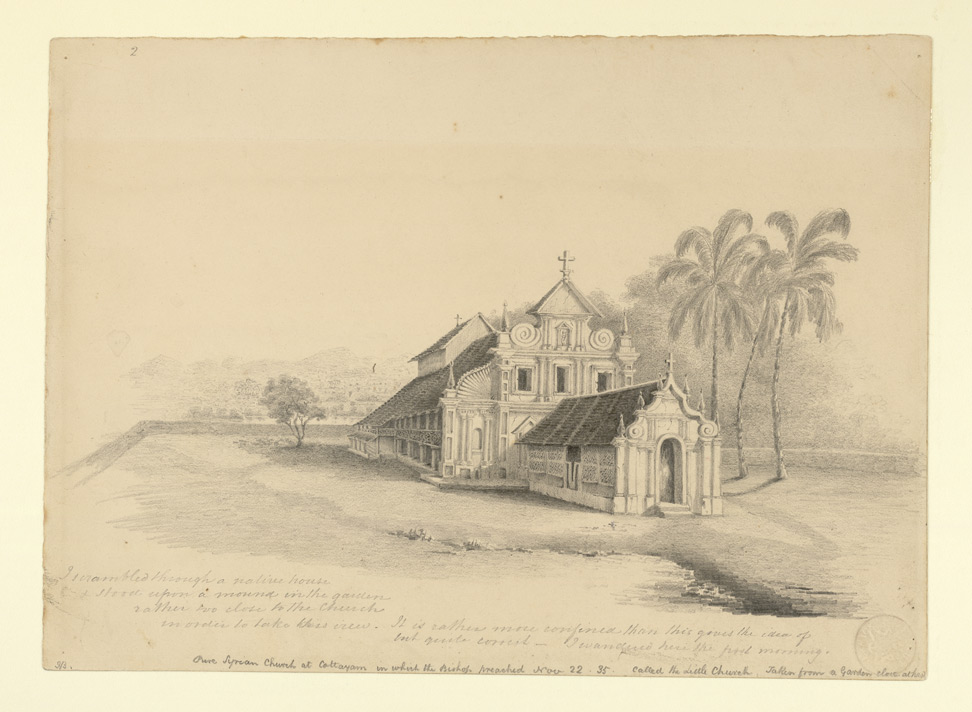
Kottayam Cheriapally, 1835 pencil drawing

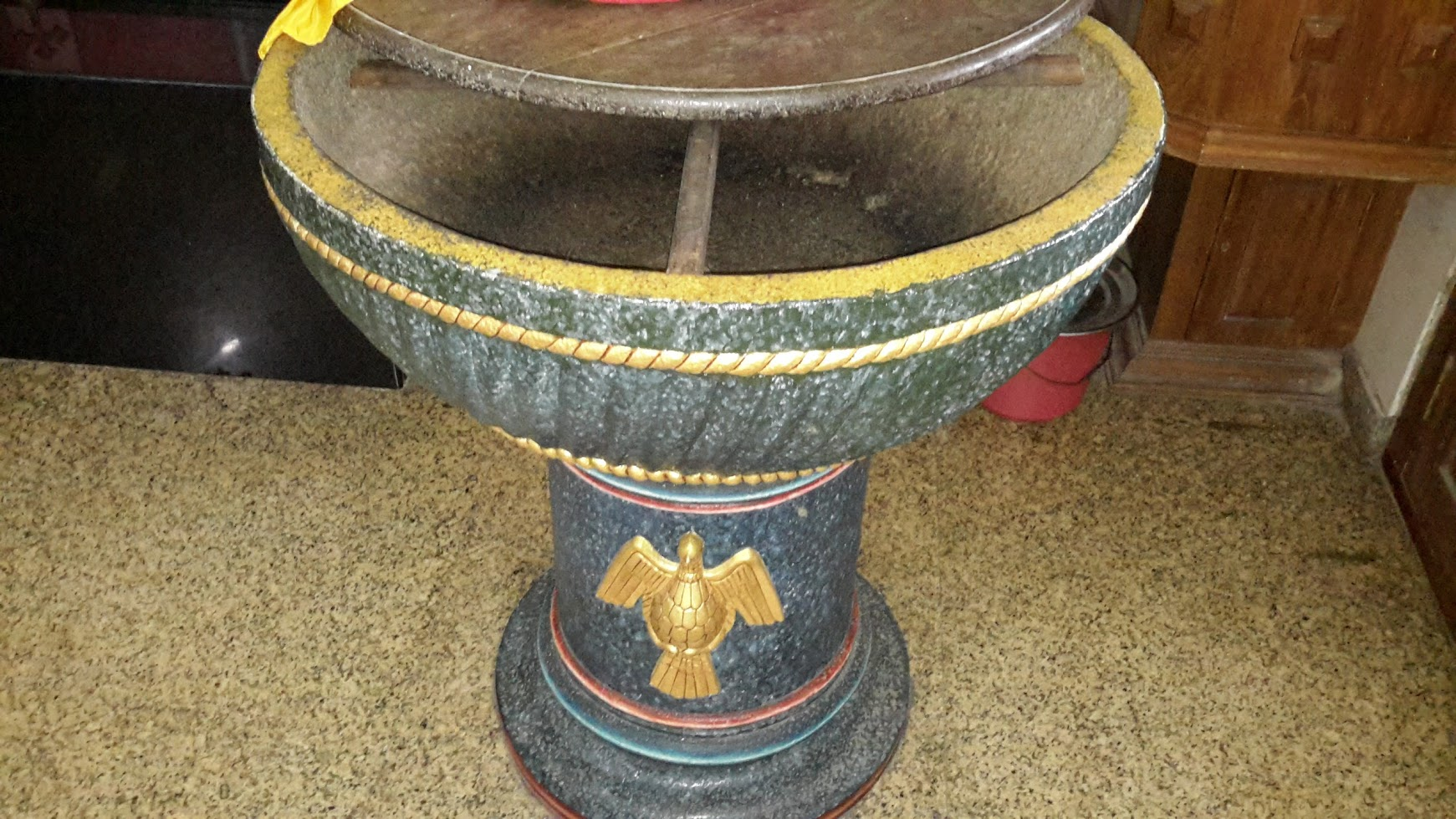
Baptismal font used in the Malankara Churches

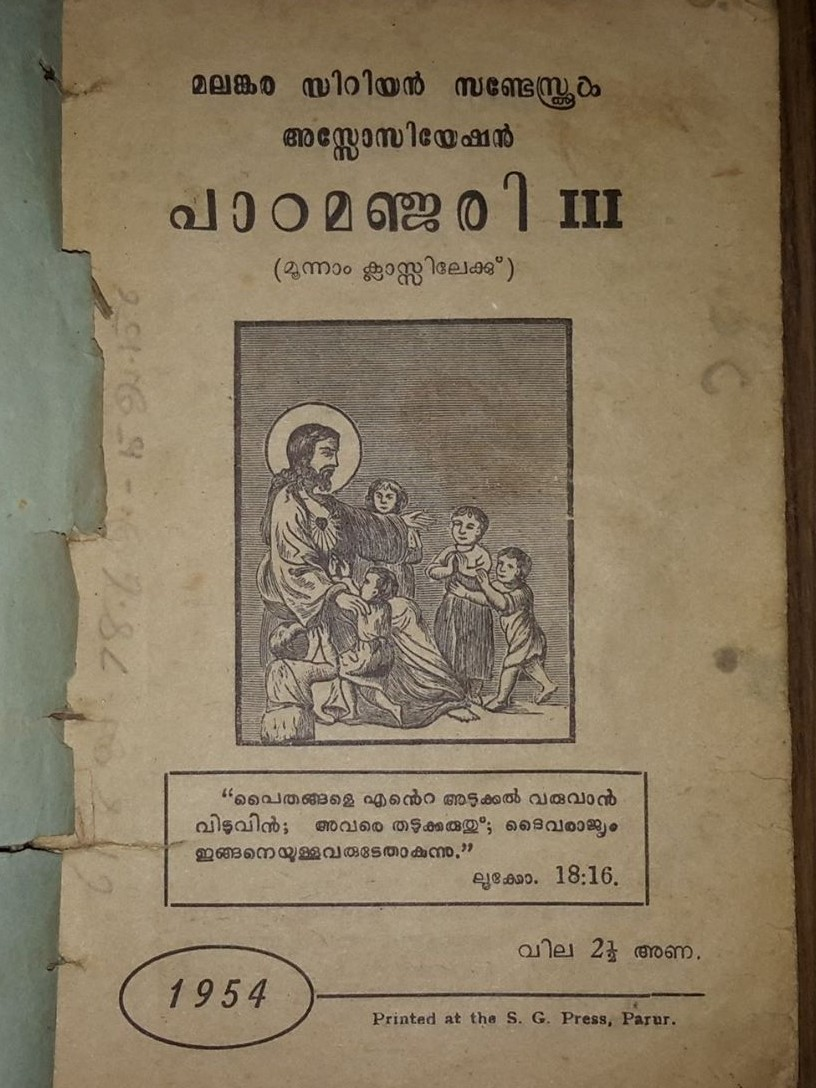
Malankara Syrian Church Sunday School Text Book

== See also ==
- Orthodox Theological Seminary, Kottayam
- Malankara Metropolitan
- List of Malankara metropolitans
