= Jacobite Syrian Christian Church =

Malankara body of the Syriac Orthodox Church in India

Jacobite Syrian Christian Church
- ܥܺܕܬܳܐ ܣܽܘܪܝܳܝܬܳܐ ܐܳܪܬ݂ܳܕ݂ܳܟ݂ܣܳܝܬܳܐ ܕܗܶܢܕܽܘ മലങ്കര യാക്കോബായ സുറിയാനി ഓർത്തഡോക്സ് സഭ
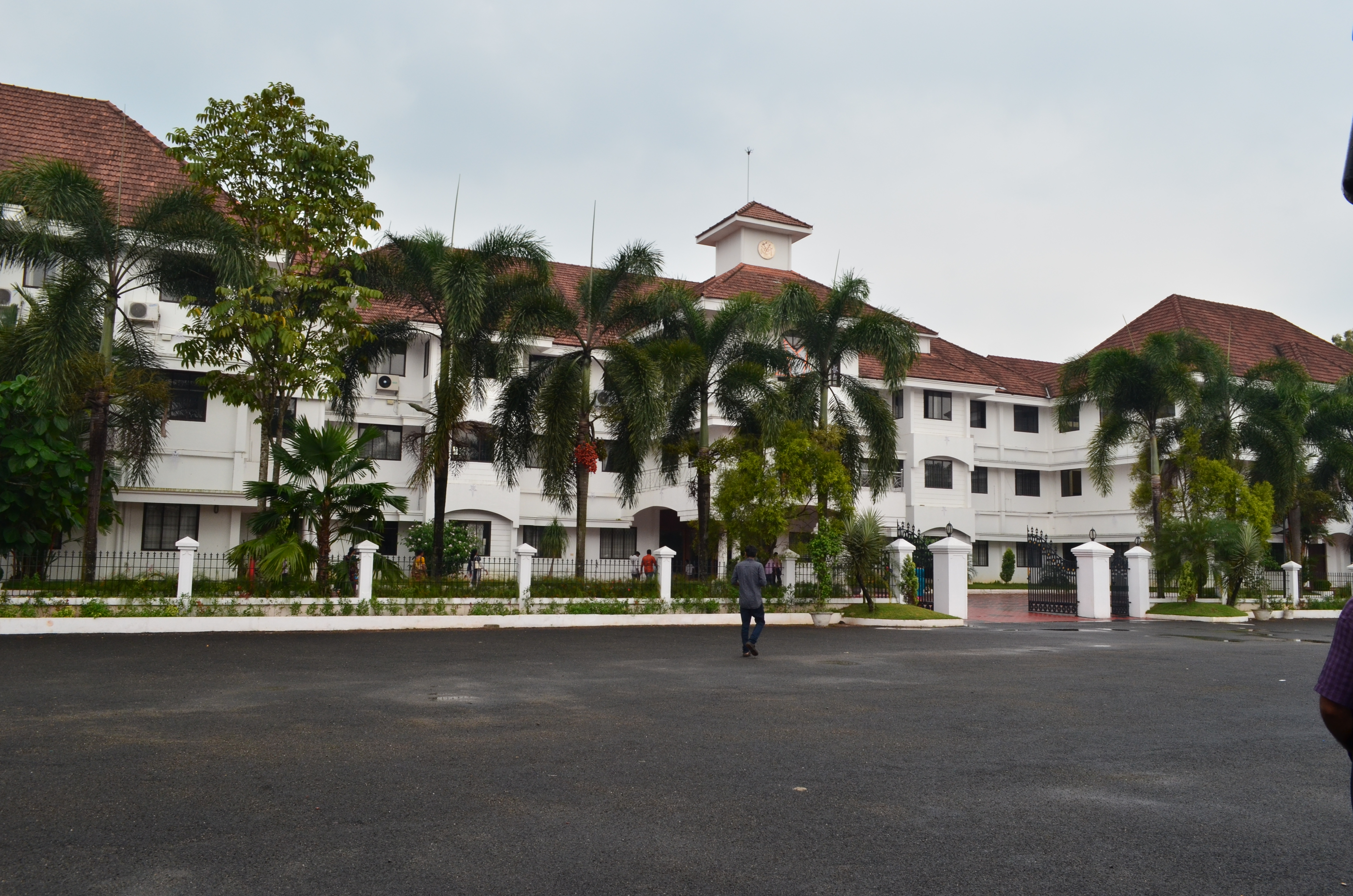
- Patriarchal Centre in Puthencruz
- Abbreviation: JSC
- Type: Maphrianate
- Classification: Christian
- Orientation: Oriental Orthodox
- Scripture: Peshitta; Vishudha Grandham
- Theology: Oriental Orthodox theology
- Polity: Episcopal
- Patriarch: Ignatius Aphrem II
- Catholicos: Baselios Joseph
- Church: Syriac Orthodox Church
- Region: India and Nasrani Malayali diaspora
- Language: Classical Syriac, Malayalam and native languages
- Liturgy: West Syriac Rite; Divine Liturgy of Saint James
- Headquarters: Patriarch Ignatius Zakka I Centre (Patriarchal Centre); Puthencruz, Kochi, India
- Founder: Saint Thomas the Apostle
- Origin: 52 AD (by tradition); 1665 (West Syriac Rite)
- Members: 1 million (2011)
- Website: jacobitesyrianchurch.org

The Jacobite Syrian Christian Church, also known as the Malankara Syriac Orthodox Church, Malankara Jacobite Syrian Church, Malankara Jacobite Syriac Orthodox Church, or the Syriac Orthodox Church in India, is an autonomous maphrianate of the Syriac Orthodox Church of Antioch based in Kerala, India. It is headed by the catholicos of India, Mor Baselios Joseph.

According to tradition, the community traces its origin to Thomas the Apostle's mission to South India in AD 52. Over time, it became an integral part of Syriac Christendom, utilizing East Syriac liturgical practices and relying on visiting bishops for spiritual guidance, while a native archdeacon oversaw temporal affairs.

In the 16th century Portuguese missionaries enforced Latin Catholic jurisdiction, severing the Malankara Church's links to the Syriac Church and enforcing Latinized liturgical customs. Following the Council of Diamper, the community rejected Latinization through the Coonan Cross oath and re-established contact with Syriac Christians.

In subsequent centuries, the Malankara metropolitans were consecrated by delegates sent by the Syriac patriarch of Antioch, who guided the community in de-Latinizing and adopting West Syriac liturgical traditions, theology, and canonical governance. The 20th century saw the revival of the historical maphrianate, governed by the catholicos of India alongside a regional holy synod.

Headquartered at the patriarchal centre in Puthencruz, Kerala, it serves a global population of around 1 million people, through various dioceses and patriarchal vicariates in India and around the world. The church employs the West Syriac Rite, with the principal Eucharistic liturgy being the Liturgy of James the Just. Classical Syriac served as the historical language of worship, but translations throughout the 19th and 20th centuries led to the widespread adoption of Malayalam and other local languages.

== Name ==
In the aftermath of the Council of Chalcedon, which fractured the Christian Church, Emperor Justin I, who supported the council, exiled Patriarch Severus of Antioch to Egypt, for refusing to accept the council, and professing Miaphysite Christology. The Syriac Orthodox Church is the church of Antioch that continued to accept Severus as patriarch until his death in 538 AD. During this turbulent time for the church, Jacob Baradaeus was consecrated as bishop with the support of Empress Theodora and he led and revived the church. The term "Jacobite" was originally used as a derogatory word for Miaphysites from the church of Antioch.

In the aftermath of the Coonan Cross oath (1653), the Portuguese Padroado missionaries began using the term "Jacobites" to designate the indigenous Christians who were a part of the Syriac Orthodox Church under Patriarch Ignatius Abdulmasih I and Metropolitan Thoma I. Throughout the 18th and 19th centuries, members of the community were frequently referred to in colonial records and historical texts as "Jacobite Syrians," though the indigenous ecclesiastical body was officially known as the "Malankara Church." Following the 1889 reformist schism, the orthodox faction formally adopted the title "Malankara Jacobite Syrian Church" to distinguish its traditionalist identity. In 2002, the historic Puthencruz convention officially adopted the contemporary legal title "Jacobite Syrian Christian Church" in its constitutional framework.

The geographical designation "Malankara" derives from Maliankara, a coastal locality near Kodungallur where, according to local tradition, Thomas the Apostle landed in 52 AD and established one of his first churches in India. The designation "Syrian" reflects the church's Syriac heritage—an ancient Semitic Christian tradition that uses Classical Syriac, an Edessan dialect of Aramaic (the language traditionally believed to be spoken by Christ) as a sacred liturgical language—rather than a political affiliation with the modern nation-state of Syria. To prevent ongoing secular misinterpretation between the state of Syria and the Syriac heritage, the holy synod of the Syriac Orthodox Church officially adopted the English title "Syriac Orthodox Church" in 2000. However, many older churches and institutions continue to use the name "Syrian".

The term "Orthodox" derives from the Greek for "right belief," reflecting the Oriental Orthodox communion's maintenance of the apostolic faith as upheld by the ecumenical councils at Nicaea (325 AD), Constantinople (381 AD), and Ephesus (431 AD). Historically, the community has referred to itself in the local Malayalam vernacular as Sathya Suryani Sabha (സത്യ സുറിയാനി സഭ), which means "Syriac Orthodox Church," with "Sathya" being translated as "True" or "Orthodox". Additionally, some historians and linguists propose that the name Tharissa Palli—the church referenced in the 9th-century Quilon copper plates—derives from the Syriac root Trishath, meaning "upright", "true", or "orthodox".

== History ==
=== Apostolic origins and early history (1st–3rd Centuries) ===
The origin of the Malankara Church is traditionally attributed to the evangelism of Thomas the Apostle, who according to community tradition arrived at the port of Muziris (near present-day Kodungallur, Kerala) in 52 AD. Church tradition holds that St. Thomas established seven and a half churches along the Malabar Coast and ordained clergy before his martyrdom at Mylapore in 72 AD.

Historians note that early Christian communities along the Malabar Coast grew primarily along Indo-Roman and Persian maritime trade routes. Patristic writers such as Eusebius of Caesarea and St. Jerome record that Pantaenus, an Alexandrian Christian scholar, visited India around 190 AD and reported finding an established community of believers who preserved a Hebrew text of the Gospel of Matthew. During this era, indigenous believers were referred to as Nasranis (Saint Thomas Christians).

=== Syriac migrations and medieval expansion (4th–15th centuries) ===
The indigenous Christian community faced a gradual decline, due to a lack of ecclessiastical structure, leaving the church vulnerable and spiritually weakened. In 345 AD, the demography and ecclesiastical structure of the Malabar church were transformed through the Knanaya migration led by the merchant St. Thomas of Cana, accompanied by a bishop, priests, and several dozen families from the Middle East. This event deepened liturgical, cultural, and administrative ties between South India and Syriac Christendom.

A second major migration occurred in the 9th century (823–825 AD), when a group of Persian merchants and clergy led by the merchant Marwan Sabrisho and two bishops, Mar Sapor and Mar Proth, arrived at the port of Kollam (Quilon). The local Venad ruler, Ayyanadikal Thiruvadikal, issued the 9th-century Quilon Syrian copper plates in 849 AD. These charters bestowed extensive civil, economic, tax-exempt, and judicial privileges upon the local Christian merchant guild and established Kollam as a major trade center. The arrival of this migration is closely associated in local tradition with the start of the Malayalam era (Kollavarsham) in 825 AD.

Throughout these centuries, the Nasranis maintained ongoing ties with the Syriac Church, operating under a dual organizational structure: local secular and civil administration was led by an archdeacon, which was a de facto hereditary role passed on through the Pakalomattom family, while spiritual hierarchy, sacraments, and liturgical traditions were sustained through ecclesiastical networks connected to the ancient sees of the east. Because they were ecclesiastically a part of the Syriac Church, they became known as Syriac Christians.

Between the 9th and 15th centuries, the Nasranis consolidated their position as an influential socio-economic and military power along the Malabar Coast. During this era, local traditions and European travel accounts record the existence of the Villarvattom Dynasty, a native Christian ruling house centered around Udayamperoor and Chendamangalam that held feudatory rights under the Second Chera Kingdom and later the Kingdom of Cochin. Operating as dominant merchant guilds they controlled major maritime trade routes, collected customs duties, and managed key port infrastructures alongside local rulers. This economic prominence earned the community high socio-feudal status, equivalent to the Nair military nobility. Local Hindu monarchs granted them hereditary honors, including the rights to carry arms, ride elephants, and use ceremonial processional insignia.

Culturally, this period saw the emergence of Karshoni—a dialect of Malayalam that was written using the Syriac alphabet—which scribes used to transcribe liturgical texts, administrative records, and prayer books, preserving native linguistic forms before the standardization of the Brahmic Malayalam script.

=== Western colonization and latinization (16th–17th centuries) ===
The arrival of Vasco da Gama in 1498 introduced European colonial power dynamics to the Malabar Coast. Portuguese missionaries sought to integrate the indigenous Nasranis into the Latin rite of the Roman Catholic Church under the padroado system. This policy culminated in the Synod of Diamper in June 1599, convened by Archbishop Aleixo de Menezes of Goa. The synod severed the Malankara Church's links to the Syriac Church and enforced latinized liturgical customs.

Resistance to Portuguese latinization led to the Coonan Cross oath on January 3, 1653, at Mattancherry, where the majority of Nasranis swore a collective oath to break free from Portuguese Jesuit authority. Following the revolt, the assembly elevated Archdeacon Thomas to episcopal status as Mar Thoma I, inaugurating the office of the metropolitan of Malankara as the ecclesiastical and temporal leader of the community. The faction that accepted Catholicism evolved into the Syro-Malabar Catholic Church.

To formalize and regularize his episcopal consecration according to eastern canonical traditions, the Nasrani community made direct contact with the Patriarchate of Antioch. In 1665, Mor Gregorios Abdal Jaleel, the metropolitan of Jerusalem sent by Patriarch Ignatius Abdulmasih I, arrived in Malabar. He regularized Mar Thoma I’s episcopacy and affirmed administrative ties with the Patriarchate of Antioch, strengthening the community's adherence to Oriental Orthodox theology, and West Syriac liturgical practices.

=== Malankara metropolitanate and missionary relations (1685–1875) ===
Following the 1665 delegation, successive hierarchs delegated by the patriarchs of Antioch visited Malabar to assist in church governance, codify liturgical traditions, and protect the community from foreign colonial influences. In 1685, a delegation led by Maphrian Mor Baselios Yeldho arrived in Kerala with Hidatyullah Ramban (later Mor Ivanios Hidatyullah) at the request of Mar Thoma II. Mor Baselios Yeldho passed away shortly after arrival at Kothamangalam, where his tomb at Marthoman Church remains a major center of pilgrimage. Mor Ivanios remained in Kerala to systematically teach theology, liturgical music, and canonical practices.

During this era, the office of the Malankara Metropolitan was maintained as a de facto hereditary title through the Pakalomattam family. In 1751, another delegation led by Maphrian Mor Baselios Shakralla arrived with Mor Gregorios Yuhanon, and Yuhanon Ramban (later Mor Ivanios Yuhannon) at the request of Mar Thoma V. This period saw extensive copying of Syriac biblical and patristic manuscripts, institutionalizing Syriac scholars and scribal traditions across Malabar. Controversies surrounding the canonical validity of Mar Thoma VI caused him to seek to regularize his consecration. In 1772, he was re-consecrated by Mor Gregorios Yuhanon and Mor Ivanios Yuhanon at Niranam Church, receiving all orders of the episcopacy and formally assuming the episcopal title Mor Dionysius I. During this time, Kattumangatt Kurien Ramban claimed to have been consecrated as bishop Mor Koorilos Abraham by Mor Gregorios Yuhanon on his deathbed, though the authenticity of these claims were disputed by Mor Dionysius I and later Jacobite historians. He left for Thorizhyoor and established the Malabar Independent Syrian Church.

The de facto dynasty of the Pakalomattom family, which had maintained hereditary succession over the office of local head of the Malankara Church for centuries, came to an end with the episcopate of Mor Dionysius II. By the early 19th century, British influence in Travancore and Cochin led to interaction with Anglican missionaries from the Church Missionary Society (CMS). Under Mor Dionysius II, the Syrian Seminary (Old Seminary) was established in Kottayam in 1815 with assistance from the British Resident Col. John Munro. Subsequent Malankara metropolitans, including Mor Dionysius III and Mor Dionysius IV, initially cooperated with the CMS missionaries. However, when missionary interference threatened traditional Syriac Orthodox doctrines and practices, the Malankara Church under Mor Dionysius IV convened the Synod of Mavelikara in 1836, formally severing ties with the CMS and re-affirming its strict adherence to the faith and canons as part of the Syriac Orthodox Church.

=== Institutionalization and 20th-century fractures (1876–1975) ===
Following the 1836 synod of Mavelikara, Abraham Malpan and his nephew Mathews led an Anglican-influenced reform movement within the Malankara Church, seeking to translate the West Syriac liturgy into Malayalam and eliminate traditional practices. In 1842, Mathews travelled to Mardin, and was consecrated as bishop Mar Athanasius Mathews by Mor Ignatius Elias II, the Syriac patriarch of Antioch, on the assumption that it was the wish of the community. Popular opposition to his reforms prompted the patriarch to send Mor Coorilos Yuyakim to evaluate the situation. To preserve unity, the aging Mor Dionysius IV relinquished active administration to Mor Coorilos Yuyakim, sparking decades of legal and jurisdictional conflict. However, the courts decided that a foreign bishop couldn't be the Malankara metropolitan and gave the title to Mar Athanasius Mathews, sparking a division.

To resolve the division, Patriarch Ignatius Peter IV convened the 1876 synod of Mulanthuruthy, which established the Malankara Association, created seven regional dioceses, and affirmed Mor Dionysius V as the recognized Malankara metropolitan. The reformist faction rejected the synod's authority, continuing under Mar Athanasius Mathews and his successor, Mar Athanasius Thomas. The schism culminated in the landmark 1889 Seminary Suit ruling, which affirmed the title of Malankara metropolitan and gave church assets to Mor Dionysius V and the traditionalist majority loyal to Oriental Orthodoxy, prompting the reformists to secede and form the independent Mar Thoma Syrian Church.

In 1909, Mor Dionysius VI succeeded Mor Dionysius V, but soon clashed with co-trustees Konat Mathen Malpan and C. J. Kurien over fund control and

church property management. The co-trustees appealed to Patriarch Mor Ignatius Abded Aloho II, who deposed Mor Dionysius VI in May 1911 and appointed Mor Coorilos Paulose in his place. Mor Dionysius VI appealed to the deposed former Patriarch Ignatius Abdulmasih II, inviting him to Kerala in 1912 to annul the excommunication and establish the Catholicate of the East, creating two factions in the church: the bishops faction (Metran Kakshi) that rejected the deposition and the patriarchal faction (Bava Kakshi) that accepted the deposition. Fr. PT Geevarghese (later Mar Ivanios Geevarghese) from the bishops faction led a movement joining the Catholic Church, becoming the Syro-Malankara Catholic Church.

Following the death of Mor Coorilos Paulose, leadership of the Patriarchal faction passed to Mor Athanasius Paulose, who served as Malankara Metropolitan from 1918 until his death in 1953. In an effort to resolve the factional disputes, Patriarch Mor Ignatius Elias III traveled to Kerala in 1931 at the request of Mor Athanasius Paulose and Lord Irwin to mediate peace, before passing away and being interred at Manjinikkara Dayara. Mor Athanasius Paulose was later succeeded as Malankara metropolitan by Mor Clemis Abraham.

In December 1958, following a landmark Indian supreme court ruling and reconciliation efforts between the two factions, Mor Clemis Abraham stepped down as Malankara metropolitan in favor of Mor Baselios Geevarghese II, facilitating the formal institutional reunion of the Malankara Church within the Syriac Orthodox Church. This unity culminated in May 1964 when Patriarch Mor Ignatius Ya'qub III installed Mor Baselios Augen I as catholicos (maphrian) in full communion with Antioch. However, conflict re-emerged when Augen I asserted ecclessiastical independence and removed the Patriarch's name from the liturgy, leading the Syriac Orthodox synod to depose him in 1975. Patriarch Ya'qub III then installed Mor Baselios Paulose II as catholicos to maintain the canonical line. The bishops faction continued under Mor Baselios Augen I and later Baselios Mar Thoma Mathews I as the Malankara Orthodox Syrian Church.

=== Modern history and recent developments (1976-present) ===
During the 1980s and 1990s, the church established dozens of diaspora parishes across North America, Europe, Oceania and the Persian Gulf to serve emigrating faithful, culminating in the creation of dedicated overseas dioceses and patriarchal vicariates. To support its theological education and institutional growth, Malankara Syrian Orthodox Theological Seminary was established at Vettickal, near Mulanthuruthy, in 1990. Under the leadership of Mor Baselios Paulose II, the headquarters and administrative center of the Jacobite Syrian Church was temporarily shifted to Muvattupuzha.

Following the repose of Mor Baselios Paulose II in 1996, a landmark historic convention was convened at Puthencruz in July 2002, which adopted a comprehensive new constitution to govern the church's temporal affairs and formally re-established the local headship under Mor Baselios Thomas I. The administrative headquarters was permanently established at the Patriarchal Centre in Puthencruz upon its completion and consecration in 2004.

The late 20th and early 21st centuries were marked by intense civil litigation over the ownership and administration of historic church properties across Kerala. This conflict reached a major turning point on 3 July 2017, when the Supreme Court of India ruled that the 1934 Constitution of the Malankara Orthodox Syrian Church applied to all parish churches, denying the Jacobite faction legal administrative control over disputed parish properties, even for those where they had an absolute majority. The verdict led to the takeover of numerous prominent historic churches and eviction of Jacobite faithful by local authorities and rival clergy from the Malankara Orthodox Syrian Church, prompting the Jacobite Church to construct hundreds of alternative worship centers and chapels across Kerala to maintain its pastoral operations.

Following the death of Mor Baselios Thomas I in October 2024, the holy synod elected Mor Gregorios Joseph, who was installed as Mor Baselios Joseph, catholicos of India in March 2025, by Mor Ignatius Aphrem II, the Syriac patriarch of Antioch, assuming leadership of the church's administration and regional governance.

== Faith and practices ==
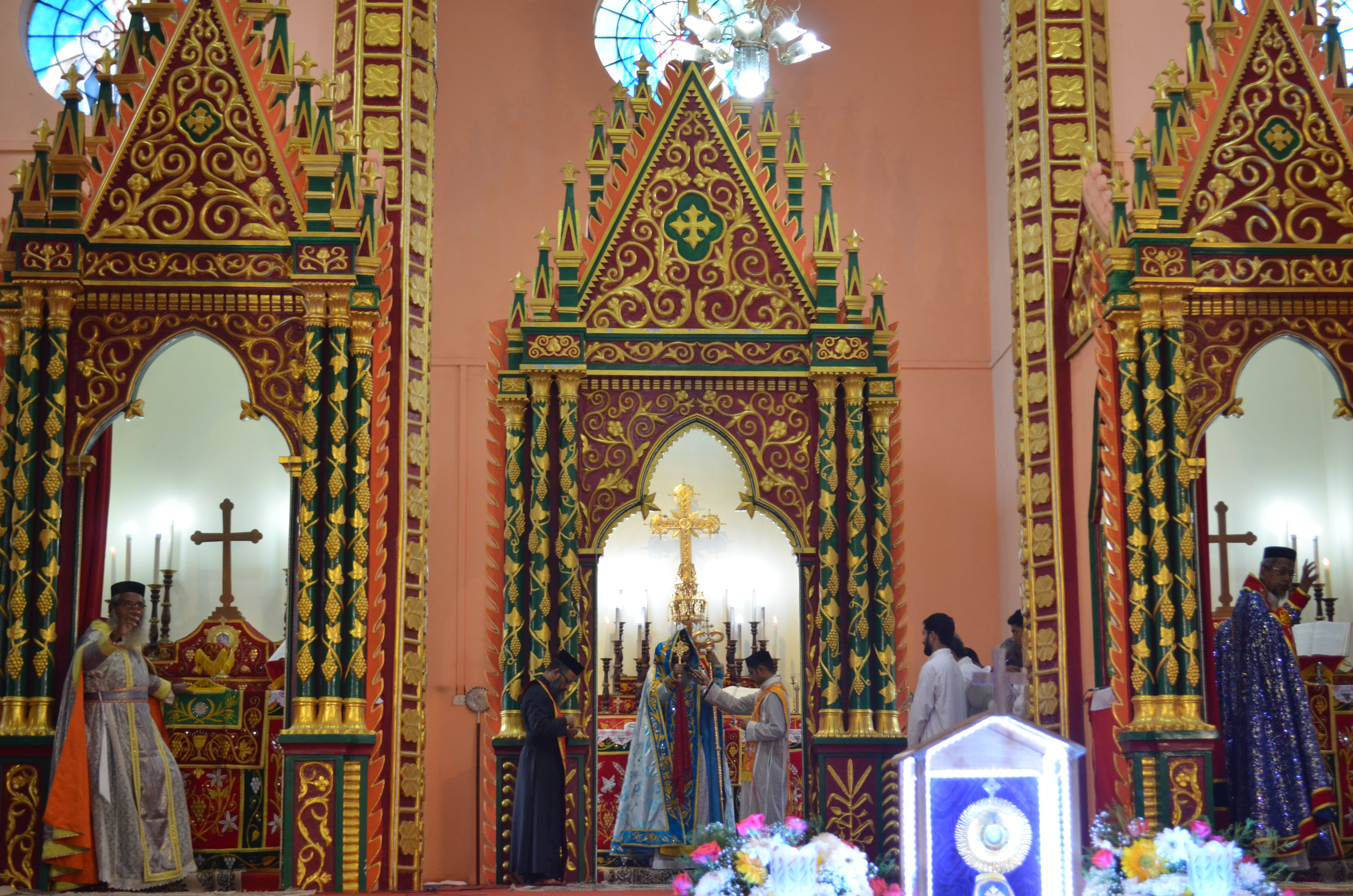
Celebration of Holy Qurobo at St. Mary's Cathedral, Kundara

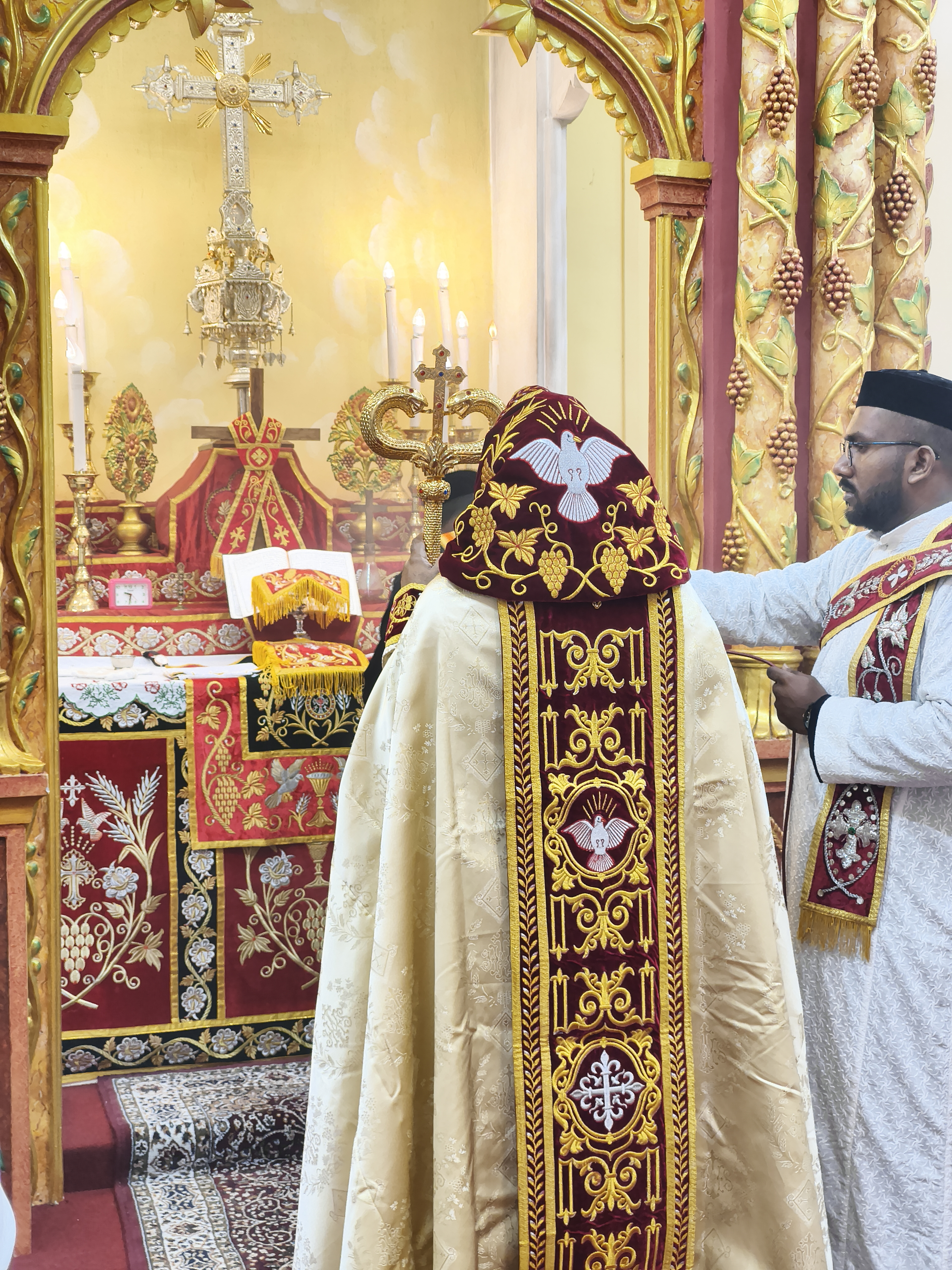
liturgy Vestment of Metropolitan and Deacon

=== Theology ===
The Jacobite Syrian Orthodox Church, as a part of the Syriac Orthodox Church accepts only the three ecumenical councils of Nicaea, Constantinople, and Ephesus alongside the rest of the Oriental Orthodox Churches. The church confesses Trinitarianism.

The church believes in the Incarnation of God the Son, who is Jesus Christ, through the Virgin Mary, who they teach was cleansed by the Holy Spirit of all natural impurity, filling her with the Father's grace. The church confesses Jesus Christ as the Incarnate Son of God, who is fully divine and fully human, united out of two natures in one incarnate nature without confusion, change, division, or separation (miaphysitism). The church maintains that at the time of Christs death, his body separated from his soul, and his divinity did not depart from either.

The church has accepted miaphysitism since early on, per pictorial evidence in St. Mary's Knanaya Church of Kottayam, Piravom Church, and Mulanthuruthy Church dating to the first millennium.

In punishment by the cross (was) the suffering on this one; He who is true Christ and God above, and Guide ever Pure

— Inscription of St. Mary's Knanaya Church, Kottayam

=== Liturgical practices ===
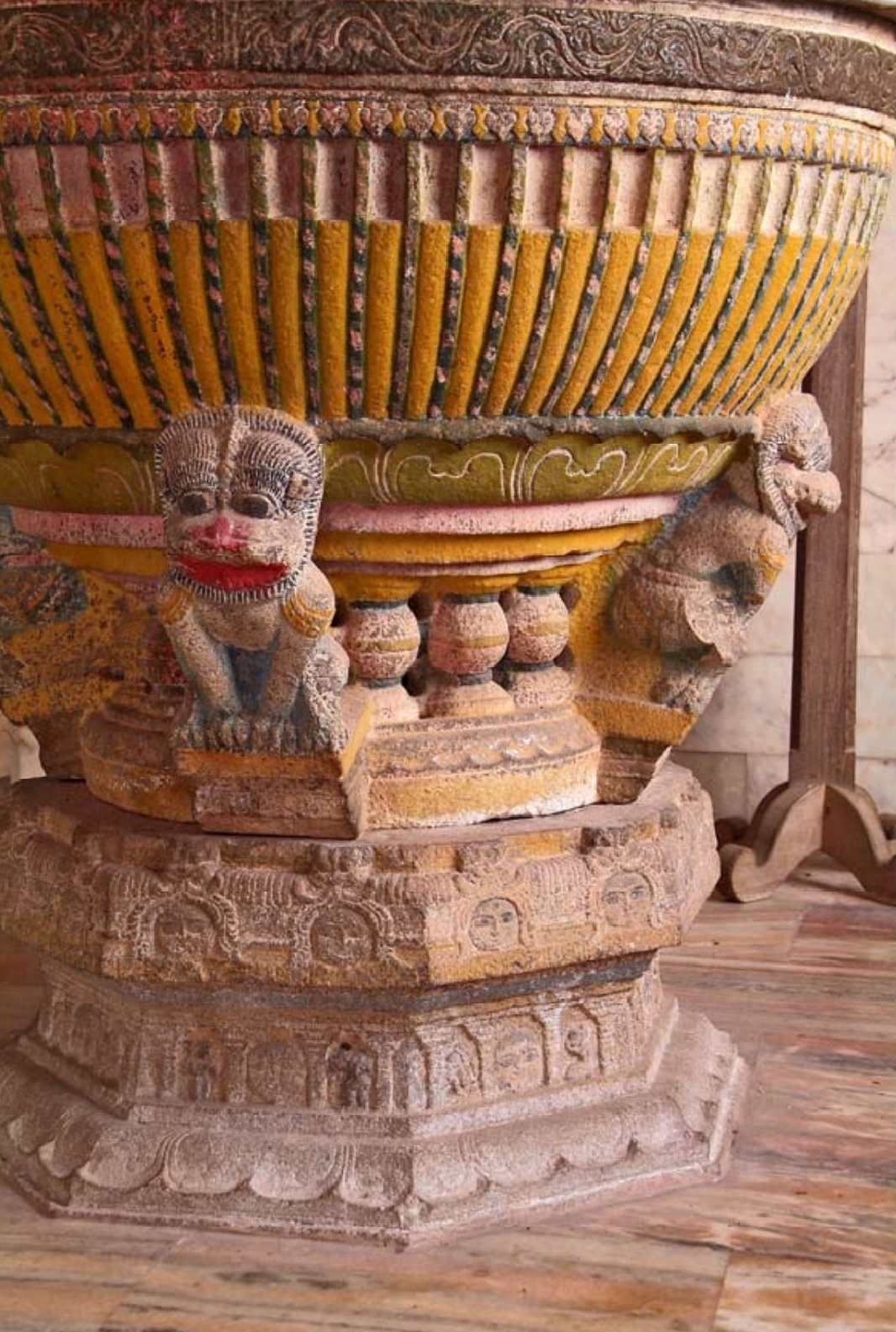
Traditional baptismal font with indigenous sculptural elements at Akaparamb Mor Sapor Mor Prod Church.

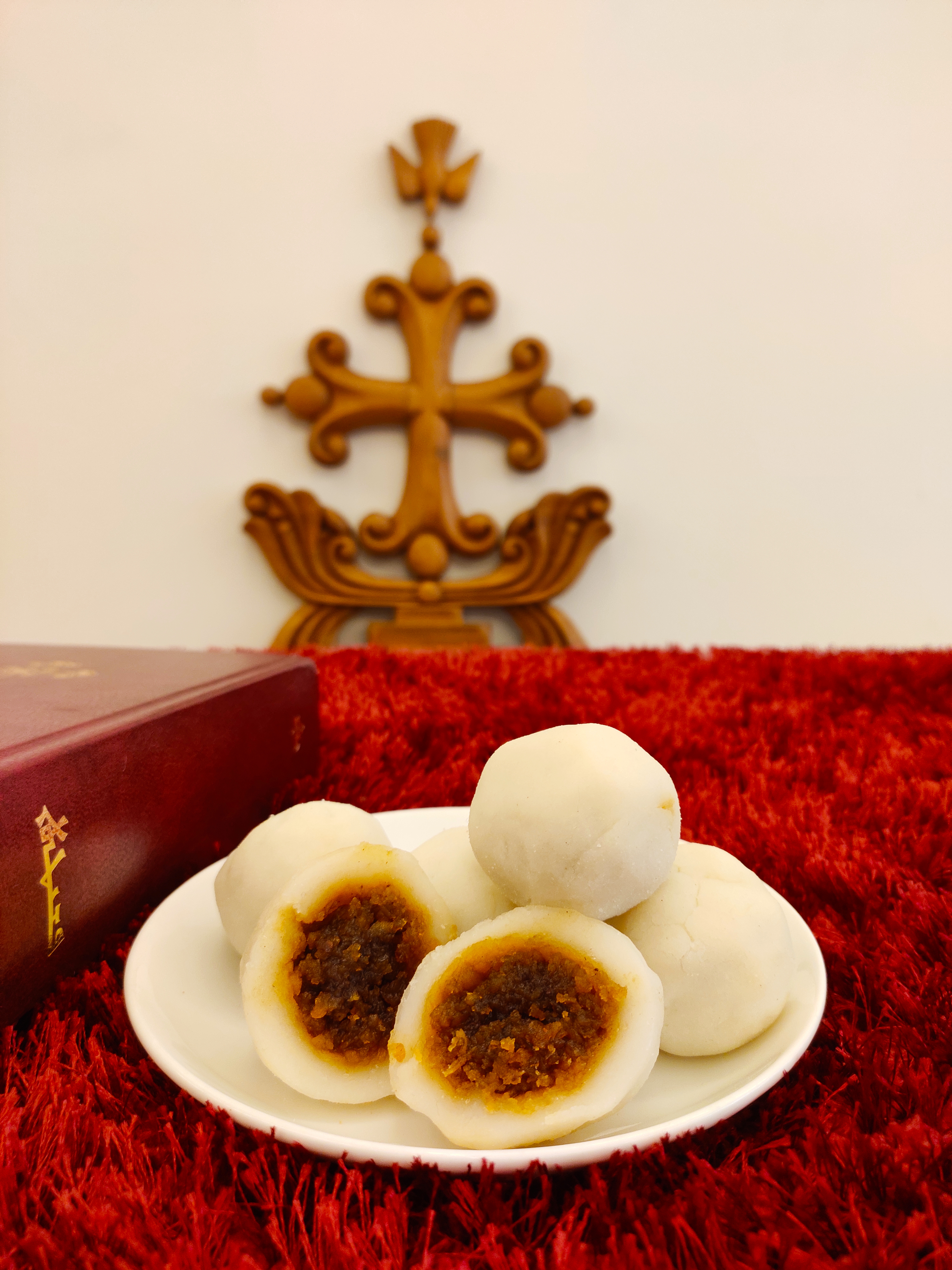
Nasrani Cross with Kozhukatta, a traditional food among Saint Thomas Christians

The Jacobite Syrian Christian Church celebrates its liturgy according to the West Syriac Rite, in alignment with the broader Syriac Orthodox Church. Liturgical services, daily canonical prayers, and sacramental rites are conducted primarily in Malayalam alongside Classical Syriac and other regional vernaculars.

Due to its history, the Malankara faithful retain certain East Syriac vocabulary. However, all prayers use the West Syriac dialect.

==== Sacraments ====
The Jacobite Syrian Church administers seven primary sacraments, regarded as visible channels of invisible divine grace instituted by Christ:

- Holy Baptism (Vishudha Mamodeesa): The foundational sacrament of initiation into the Christian faith, through which the candidate is reborn into the body of Christ. Baptism is administered through a combination of partial immersion and pouring with consecrated water in the name of the Holy Trinity, symbolizing burial and resurrection with Christ. Baptism is only administered once, and is a required before receiving all other sacraments.
- Holy Chrismation (Vishudha Mooron): Administered immediately following Baptism, wherein the newly baptized is anointed with Holy Chrism (Mooron) to receive the gifts and seal of the Holy Spirit. In the West Syriac tradition, the consecrated oil—a complex mixture of olive oil, myrrh, balsam, and multiple aromatic spices—is consecrated exclusively by the Patriarch (historically delegated to the Catholicos as well) with at least two other bishops. During each consecration ceremony, a small portion of the previous batch is added to the newly prepared oil, preserving an unbroken lineage traditionally believed to trace back directly to the original batch consecrated by the Apostles. Chrismation is only administered once. Often, those that join the Church that have already received a valid baptism may be received with Chrismation.
- Holy Eucharist (Vishudha Qurbana): The "Queen of the Sacraments" and the central act of worship, in which the consecrated bread and wine are transformed into the real Body and Blood of Jesus Christ. Faithful partake in the Holy Mysteries for the remission of sins, spiritual healing, and eternal life, actively participating in Christ's once-for-all sacrifice on Calvary and His Resurrection. Faithful may receive the Holy Eucharist only once a day and must receive it at least once a year on the feast of Passover.
- Holy Confession (Vishudha Kumbasaaram): The obligatory sacrament of repentance wherein a believer confesses sins directly to God in the presence of an ordained priest, who serves as a spiritual physician, witness, and representative of Christ. Rooted in Christ's delegation of the power to bind and loose, the priest pronounces divine absolution through the laying on of hands, granting forgiveness of sins committed after baptism, moral healing, and restoration to full ecclesiastical communion. It is recommended to be administered every 40 days, but the required and common practice involves confessing once a year during Lent, with a general prayer of absolution being offered every Liturgy.
- Holy Priesthood (Vishudha Kahanoosa): The sacrament of ordination that transmits unbroken apostolic succession through the laying on of hands. All sacraments of the church must be administered by validly ordained priests. Bishops are recognized as the direct successors of the Apostles. Ordination to all major orders can only be conferred by a bishop, while the consecration of a bishop requires the Patriarch or Catholicos acting with at least two other bishops.
- Holy Matrimony (Vishudha Vivaham): The holy sacrament that sanctifies the lifelong marital union between a man and a woman, elevating their covenant into a reflection of the union between Christ and the Church. The rite is highlighted by two key liturgical acts: the Blessing of the Rings (symbolizing mutual consent and pledge) and the Ceremonial Crowning of the bride and groom as king and queen of their new domestic church.
- Holy Unction (Vishuda Kandheela): The sacrament of anointing the sick, administered by priests to impart spiritual and physical healing to those suffering from illness. Through prayers of faith and anointing with consecrated oil, the sacrament seeks divine restoration of health, comfort in suffering, and the forgiveness of sins.

==== Divine liturgy ====
The central act of worship in the Jacobite Syrian Christian Church is the Holy Qurbana (the Eucharistic liturgy), in which the bread and wine are believed to transform into the real Body and Blood of Christ. While the primary service used is the Liturgy of St. James, the brother of the Lord, the church also employs around 80 anaphoras authored by Church Fathers such as John Chrysostom, Severus of Antioch, and Dionysius Bar Salibi.

Celebrated facing east, the altar is separated from the nave by a sacred veil that opens and closes at specific intervals during the service to signify the revealing and concealing of the Divine Mysteries. The service is structured into two main divisions: the mass of the catechumens and the liturgy of the faithful. The mass of the catechumens comprises scriptural readings from the epistles and gospels, prayers of repentance and absolution, and a joint recitation of the Nicene Creed. Traditionally, the sermon was given here too. Although no longer enforced in modern practice, the unbaptized were traditionally dismissed following this initial section. The service then proceeds to the Liturgy of the Faithful, which includes the exchange of the kiss of peace, the consecration of the holy mysteries, intercessory prayers for the living and departed faithful, the fracture and commixture, and the presentation of the holy mysteries to the congregation.

The liturgy is offered on Sundays and major feast days, with many parishes celebrating it on other days as well. Canonical regulations dictate that the faithful may attend the divine liturgy and receive the Eucharist only once per day. A priest may celebrate the liturgy twice in a day in cases of dire pastoral need and with explicit permission from the bishop.

==== Holy Bible ====
The official biblical text of the Jacobite Syrian Christian Church is the Peshitta, the standard Syriac version of the Old and New Testaments. In public liturgy and private devotions, the text is used in its traditional Malayalam translation, commonly referred to as the Vishudhagrandham (വിശുദ്ധ ഗ്രന്ഥം).

In accordance with West Syriac manuscript traditions, the Syriac Old Testament canon includes several deuterocanonical books (such as Tobit, Judith, 1 and 2 Maccabees, Wisdom of Solomon, Sirach, Baruch, and 3 Maccabees), as well as additions like Psalm 151 and the Prayer of Manasseh. The traditional West Syriac New Testament canon comprises 22 books, historically omitting five shorter epistles and books (2 Peter, 2 John, 3 John, Jude, and the Revelation), though these are included in modern printed editions used for study and reference.

Selected readings from the gospels, epistles, and Old Testament lectionaries are chanted during the Holy Qurbana and canonical hours according to a structured annual liturgical calendar.

==== Prayers ====
There are 7 hours of prayers in the Syriac Orthodox Church, in accordance with Psalms 119:164. The hours are: vespers (Ramsho/Sandhya - 6pm), compline (Sootara - 9pm), midnight (Patharathri - 12am), matins (Saphro/Prabatha-6am), third hour (Moonammani- 9am), sixth hour (Arammani- 12pm), and ninth hour (Ombpadammani - 3pm).

Daily prayers rely on the Shehimo, which is a prayer book that contains a different set of prayers for every hour of the week. The Shehimo was translated to Malayalam in 1976 by Curien Kaniyamparambil Malpan. For Sundays and feast days, prayers before the Divine Liturgy are taken from the Fenquitho.

The church uses a simplified tradition of two liturgical seasons for Sundays: Sleeba (Feast of the Holy Cross to Easter), which adapts prayers mostly from Wednesday's Shehimo along with selections from Tuesday, Friday, and Sunday, and Qyamtha (Easter to the Feast of the Holy Cross), which uses prayers from Sunday's Shehimo and the Fenquitho's Easter service. The Fenquitho is still used for important feast days.

A common practice in households involves combining the ninth hour, vespers and compline from the Pampakuda Namaskaram, a set of common daily prayers translated from the Shehimo in 1910 by Konatt Mathen Malpan.

Both the Shehimo and Fenquitho used in Malankara comes from the Pampakuda manuscript. Prayers are done facing the east, and churches are normally built facing the east, in accordance with Matthew 24:27. Prostrations and kneeling form an integral practice within personal and liturgical prayer, symbolizing penance, humility, and bodily worship. However, in accordance with the Council of Nicaea, it is canonically prohibited on Sundays and throughout the fifty days between Easter and Pentecost. This prohibition reflects the joy of Christ's resurrection, during which the faithful stand upright in prayer to signify their restored status as a redeemed people.

==== Beth Gazo ====
The liturgical singing of the Jacobite Syrian Christian Church is grounded in the Beth Gazo, the foundational hymnal and musical repertoire of the Syriac Orthodox liturgical tradition. The Beth Gazo contains hundreds of traditional hymns, responsories, and chants organized into an ancient modal system known as the Octoechos. The Malankara school of the Beth Gazo contains some Carnatic influences. Transmitted orally through generations of clergy, deacons, and choristers—and later codified in printed music books and recordings—learning the Beth Gazo remains a central discipline in liturgical training.

==== Fasting and abstinence ====
Fasting is a fundamental pillar of spiritual discipline and ascetic practice within the Jacobite Syrian Christian Church. In accordance with West Syriac canonical tradition, the church observes five major multi-day fasts throughout the liturgical year. Traditional fasting practices include total fasting until the ninth hour (3pm), then abstaining from meat, poultry, dairy, eggs, and animal products. Modern pastoral guidelines for fasting includes abstaining from meat, fish and egg for the entire period of the fast:

- Great Lent (Valiya Nombu): Commencing with the Service of Reconciliation (Shubqono), the fast spans forty days—commemorating Christ's forty-day fast in the wilderness—and concludes on Lazarus Saturday (Kozhukatta Sheniaycha). This transitions the congregation into Passion Week, a period of intense fasting, and solemn prayer, culminating in the celebration of the Resurrection on Easter.
- Nineveh Fast (Ninawa Nombu): A three-day fast observed three weeks before Great Lent, commemorating the repentance of Nineveh following the preaching of the Prophet Jonah.
- Apostles' Fast (Sleeha Nombu ): Commemorates the fasting and ministry of the Twelve Apostles following Pentecost. Modern pastoral guidelines only mandate fasting for the last three days of the fast.
- Dormition Fast (Shunoyo Nombu): A 15-day fast observed from August 1 to August 15 in honor of the Dormition of the Blessed Virgin Mary. Modern pastoral guidelines only mandate fasting for the last five days of the fast.
- Nativity Fast (Yeldho Nombu): A 25-day period of preparation preceding the Feast of the Nativity (Christmas), observed from December 1 to December 25. Modern pastoral guidelines only mandate fasting for the last ten days of the fast.

Beyond the canonical fasts, several optional fasts are widely observed within the Malankara tradition. Most prominent among these is the Eight-Day Fast (Ettu Nombu), observed from September 1 to September 8 in preparation for the Nativity of the Virgin Mary, which holds particular devotional significance across Kerala. Additionally, faithful often undertake votive fasts prior to the feast days of parish patron saints. In accordance with traditional funeral customs, immediate family members observe a forty-day period of prayer and fasting following the death of a relative. This memorial period includes offering the Divine Liturgy for the departed soul on the 3rd, 9th, 30th, and 40th days after death.

The church also prescribes weekly fasting on all Wednesdays (commemorating the betrayal of Christ) and Fridays (commemorating the Crucifixion), with the exception of the 50 days between Easter and Pentecost. Fasting is also observed on Sundays before the Divine Liturgy, which involves total abstinence from all food and drink from midnight until the consumption of the Holy Eucharist, after which total abstinence from food is canonically prohibited for the rest of the day, even during a fasting period.

==== Liturgical calendar ====
The Jacobite Syrian Christian Church follows the Syriac Orthodox liturgical calendar, structuring the ecclesiastical year into distinct seasons that celebrate the history of salvation. The liturgical year begins with the Sanctification of the Church (Qudosh Idto), which falls on the last Sunday of October or the first Sunday of November. While traditionally adhering to the Julian Calendar, the Malankara Church adopted the Gregorian Calendar in 1953 pursuant to Encyclical No. 620 issued by Patriarch Ignatius Aphrem I Barsoum.

=== Holy orders ===
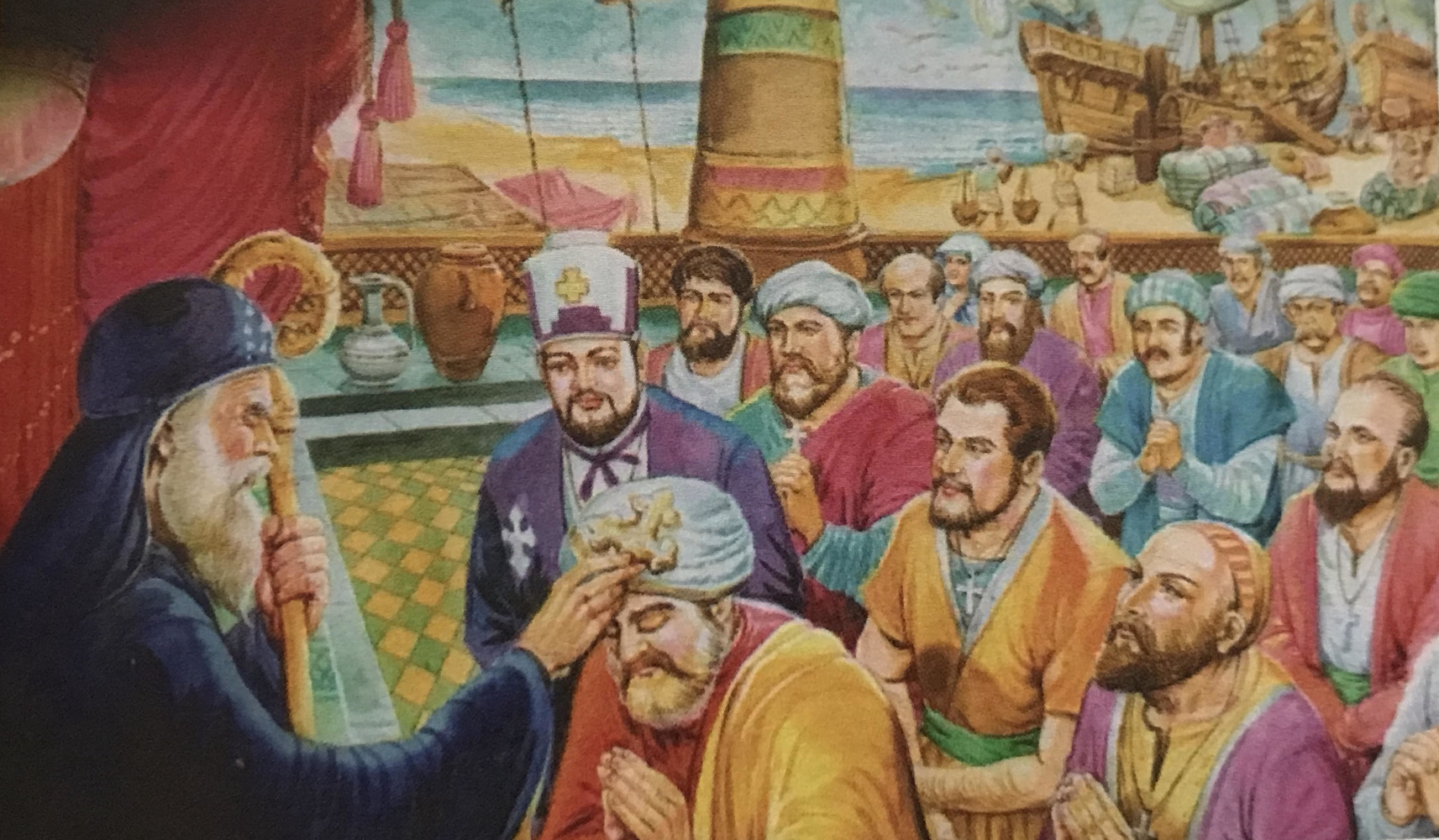
Thomas of Cana and the Knanaya depart for India

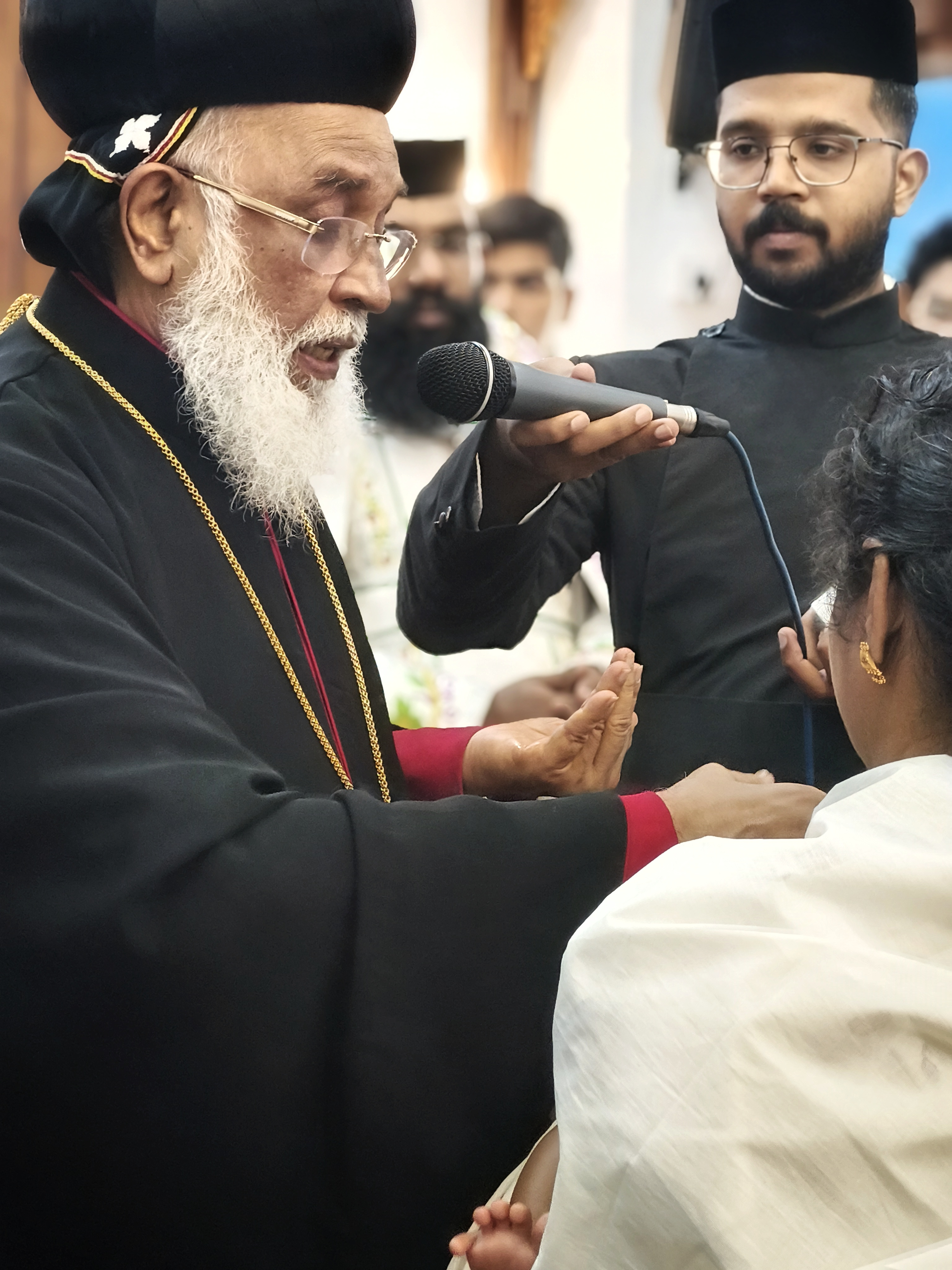
HG Mor Timotheos Thomas during the Sacrament of Baptism with the Holy Myron.

The Jacobite Syrian Orthodox Church of India maintains apostolic succession within the hierarchy of the Syriac Orthodox Church and the greater Oriental Orthodox Churches.

The church functions under the Syriac Orthodox patriarchate of Antioch, established by St. Peter in 37 AD and confirmed as a historic patriarchate at the First Council of Nicaea (325 AD) alongside Rome and Alexandria. Its local head in India is the catholicos of India, who preserves continuity with the historic office of the maphrian. This office was originally instituted under the jurisdiction of Antioch to consecrate bishops and administer local ecclesiology in eastern territories where direct oversight by the patriarch was geographically impractical.

The General Synod of the Syriac Orthodox Church is the highest ecclesiastical body of the Syriac Orthodox Church, comprising all the bishops of the church and presided over by the patriarch. The bishops of the dioceses in India form the Malankara Synod, which is presided over by the catholicos. Bishops of the diaspora form part of the Antiochian Synod, which is presided over by the patriarch. Patriarchal vicariates are under the ecclesiastical care of the patriarch, who appoints bishops to serve as patriarchal vicars.

Three ranks of holy orders

- Episcopate: patriarch, catholicos, archbishop and bishop.
- Presbyterate: archpriest and priest.
- Diaconate: archdeacon, deacon, subdeacon, lector and acolyte

=== Monasticism ===
Monasticism holds a deeply influential position within the Syriac Orthodox tradition, serving as the historical backbone of its asceticism, theological scholarship, and episcopal leadership. In accordance with tradition, all bishops of the church are chosen exclusively from monastic priests. Some celibate priests live dedicated ascetic lives without having formally taken monastic vows. If selected for the episcopate, such priests are required to receive the monastic tonsure and take formal vows prior to their episcopal consecration.

In India, several monasteries serve as centers of spiritual retreat, liturgical preservation, and administrative governance. Monastics take vows of poverty, chastity, and obedience, devoting their lives to the canonical hours of prayer, physical labor, and pastoral service to the surrounding community. Monks can be from any rank, but most male monks in Malankara are priests (hieromonks) or bishops. Female monks are called nuns and live in separate convents.

=== Intercession of saints ===
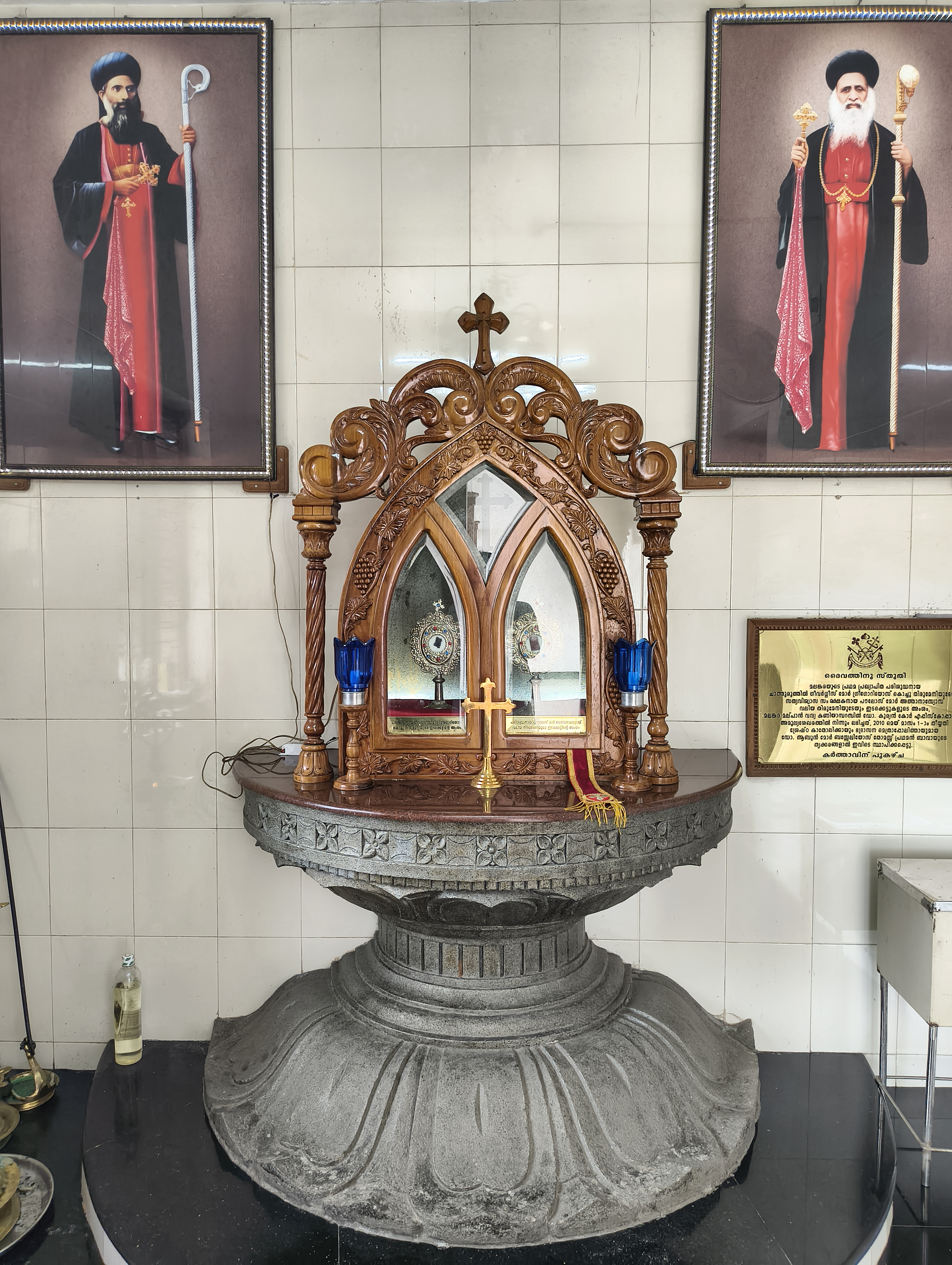
The prayer room of Vilangu St. Mary's Church keeping the Holy relics of Mor Gregorios Geevarghese and Mor Athanasius Paulose

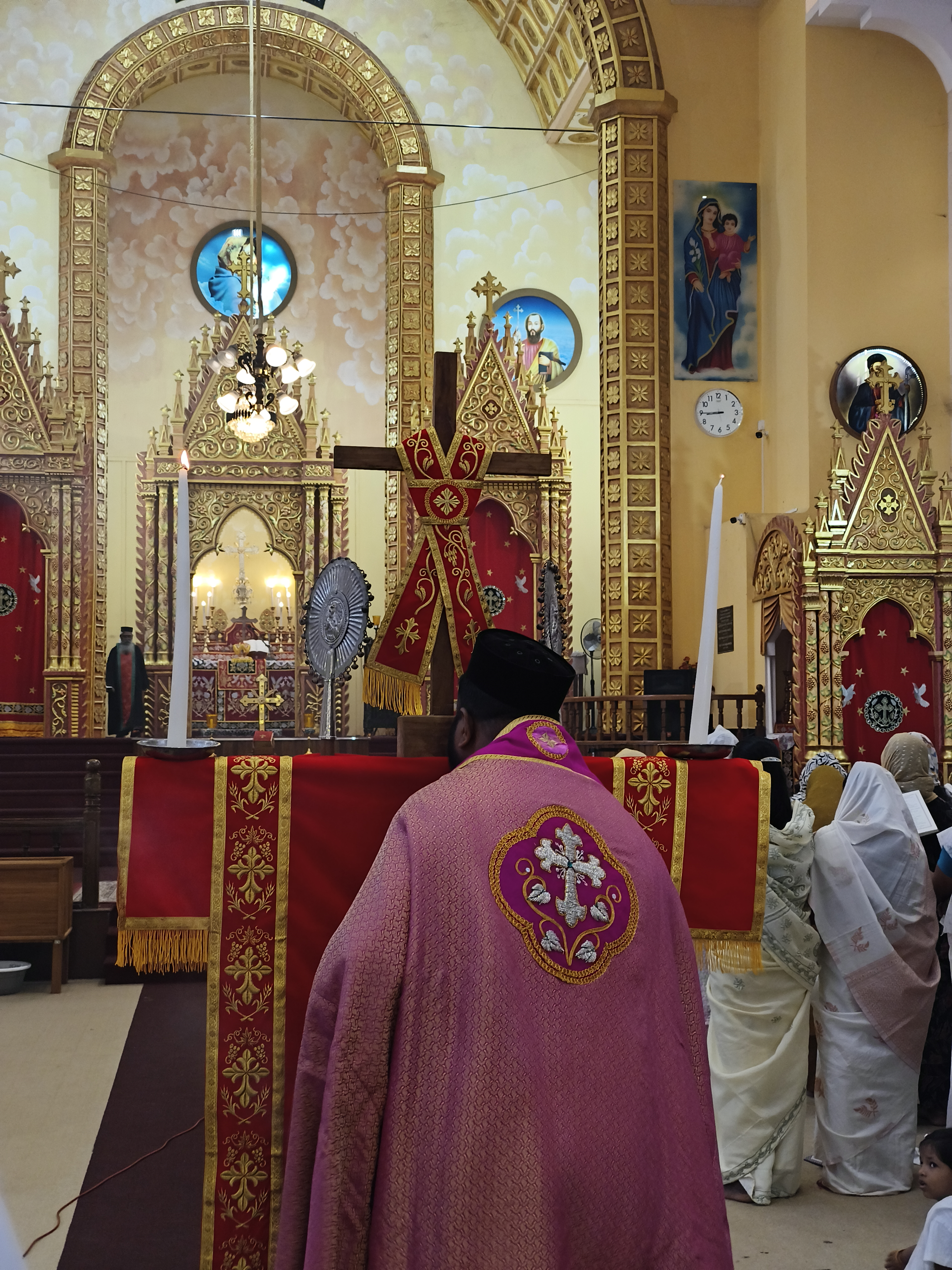
The Syriac Orthodox Lenten cross, representing Golgotha, being kissed by the priest.

The church believes in the intercessions of the Virgin Mary and all the saints. The church holds the place of St. Mary as the Mother of God as affirmed by the Council of Ephesus, with the title of Theotokos (Θεοτόκος) in Greek, Yoldath Aloho (ܝܠܕܬ ܐܠܗܐ) in Syriac, or Daiva Mathavu (ദൈവമാതാവ്) in Malayalam. The church also considers Thomas the Apostle as its patron saint, the Apostle of India (ܫܠܝܚܐ ܕܗܢܕܘܐ Shleehe d'Hendo). Its most venerated relics include the Holy Girdle of St. Mary and the relics of St. Thomas the Apostle. The church of India also venerates other saints, local saints, church fathers and martyrs, aligned with the practices of the entire Syriac Orthodox Church.

== Jurisdictions ==
- Kollam Diocese
- Thumpamon Diocese
- Niranam Diocese
- Kottayam Diocese
- Idukki Diocese
- Kandanad Diocese
- Kochi Diocese
- Angamaly Diocese
  - Angamaly
  - Perumbavoor
  - Muvattupuzha
  - Kothamangalam
  - Highrange
- Thrissur Diocese
- Kozhikode Diocese
- Malabar Diocese
- Mangalore Diocese
- Bangalore Diocese
- Mylapore Diocese
- Mumbai Diocese
- Delhi Diocese
- Thiruvananthapuram Diocese
- Malankara Syriac Knanaya Archdiocese
  - Ranni
  - Kallisserry
  - America, Canada and Europe
- Malankara Simhasana Patriarchal Vicariates
  - South Kerala
  - North Kerala
  - Kottayam and environs
- EAE Archdiocese
- Honovar Mission Archdiocese
- Malankara Archdiocese of North America
- Malankara Archdiocese of Australia
- Patriarchal Vicarates outside India:
  - Kuwait
  - Qatar
  - Bahrain
  - United Arab Emirates
  - Oman
  - Saudi Arabia
  - Yemen
  - New Zealand
  - United Kingdom
  - Germany
  - Canada
  - Singapore
  - Malaysia
  - Holy Land

== Ecumenical relationships ==
While globally represented as part the Syriac Orthodox Church, with theological dialogues conducted collectively by the entire Oriental Orthodox Churches — the Jacobite Syrian Christian Church (JSCC) maintains distinct local, regional, and bilateral ecumenical engagements tailored specifically to the context in Kerala. All ecumenical dialogues are under the oversight and leadership of the Patriarch.

=== Bilateral dialogue with the Catholic Church ===
Since 1989, the Jacobite Syrian Christian Church has engaged in direct localized bilateral theological dialogue with the Vatican via the Joint International Commission for Dialogue between the Catholic Church and the Malankara Syrian Orthodox Church. Operating alongside representatives from local Catholic rites in India (Syro-Malabar, Syro-Malankara, and the Latin Church), this commission has produced several pastoral agreements including:

- Agreement on intermarriage (1994): established canonical provisions and mutual recognition of the sacrament of Holy Matrimony between Catholic and Jacobite faithful under defined conditions.
- Shared pastoral care and facilities: formulated guidelines allowing shared access to hospital chaplaincies, educational institution campus ministries, cemetery usage, and local liturgical sharing for diaspora communities lacking independent church facilities.

=== Regional ecumenical cooperation ===
The church is an active member of the Kerala Council of Churches (KCC), collaborating with other Kerala Christian traditions. Through local regional forums, the church engages in:

- Socio-political advocacy: joint representation to state and central governments regarding educational rights for religious minorities, welfare programs, and social justice initiatives.
- Nasrani cultural heritage: collaborative initiatives aimed at preserving the Syriac language, historic manuscripts, and traditional art forms.

== See also ==
- Syriac Orthodox Church
- Syriac Orthodox Patriarch of Antioch and All the East
  - List of patriarchs of Antioch – to 518
  - List of Syriac Orthodox patriarchs of Antioch – list from 518
- Catholicos of India
  - Maphrian of the East
  - List of maphrians
- Oriental Orthodox Churches
- Saint Thomas Christians
  - Malankara Church

== Sources ==
- Brock, Sebastian P. (2011). "Thomas Christians". In Sebastian P. Brock; Aaron M. Butts; George A. Kiraz; Lucas Van Rompay (eds.). Gorgias Encyclopedic Dictionary of the Syriac Heritage: Electronic Edition. Gorgias Press.
- Frykenberg, Robert E. (2008). Christianity in India: From Beginnings to the Present. Oxford: Oxford University Press. ISBN 9780198263777.
- Seleznyov, Nikolai N. (2010). "Nestorius of Constantinople: Condemnation, Suppression, Veneration: With special reference to the role of his name in East-Syriac Christianity". Journal of Eastern Christian Studies. 62 (3–4): 165–190.
- Wilmshurst, David (2000). The Ecclesiastical Organisation of the Church of the East, 1318–1913. Louvain: Peeters Publishers. ISBN 9789042908765.
