= Clemis Abraham =

Indian prelate (1918-2002)

ܡܳܪܝ̱ ܩܠܶܡܺܝܣ ܐܰܒ݂ܪܳܗܳܡ Qooberneeyto Hakeemo Mor Clemis Abraham Great Metropolitan of the East
- Malankara Metropolitan and Archbishop of Knanaya Archdiocese
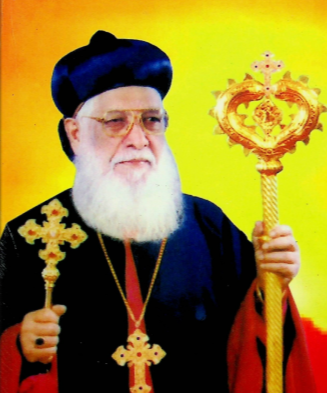
- Mor Clemis Abraham
- Church: Malankara Jacobite Syrian Orthodox Church
- In office: 1957 - 1958
- Predecessor: Mor Athanasius Paulose
- Successor: Mor Baselios Geevarghese II
- Other posts: Archbishop of Knanaya Syrian Archdiocese, Malankara Metropolitan of Malankara Jacobite Syrian Orthodox Church (1957-58)

Orders
- Ordination: 15 January 1947 by Yulios Elias Qoro
- Consecration: 15 April 1951 by Ignatius Aphrem I Barsoum
- Rank: Chief Metropolitan

Personal details
- Born: 22 April 1918 Vaikom, Ranni, Travancore, British Raj
- Died: September 29, 2002 (aged 84) Lisie Hospital, Kochi, Ernakulam, Kerala, India
- Buried: St. John's Dayro, Mor Epiram Seminary Chingavanam, Kottayam
- Denomination: Oriental Orthodoxy
- Education: Columbia University, Annamalai University

Mor Clemis Abraham, Chief Metropolitan of the East (born as Abraham, 22 April 1918 – 29 September 2002) was a bishop of the Syriac Orthodox Church, who served as the 19th Malankara Metropolitan of the Malankara Syriac Orthodox Church from 1957 to 1958 and the Archbishop of the Knanaya Syriac Archdiocese of Malankara Syriac Orthodox Church.

== Education ==
Mor Clemis Abraham did his primary education at the Vaikom Town Government Lower Primary School. His secondary education was in MS Higher Secondary School, Ranni in 1934. and later joined St. Mary's High School in Aluva. He passed his pre-degree from CMS College Kottayam and joined St. Xavier's College, Palayamkottai for Bachelor of Arts. He did his master's degree in political science from Annamalai University, studied Syriac and theology studies at the Theological Seminary in Mosul. In 1960 he obtained a Master of Divinity from Union Theological Seminary in New York City, United States of America.

== Ecumenical relations ==
He had an audience with the pope of Rome at Vatican on July 29, 1960, and on May 14, 1980, Mor Clemis visited the pope again at Vatican with Patriarch Mor Ya`qub III.

== Honors ==
- 1982, Patriarch Mor Ignatius Zakka I conferred the title Kooberneethi Hakheemo (wise captain).
- 1989, the title Great Metropolitan of the East by Patriarch Mor Ignatius Zakka I.
- 1992, Established a school named after himself: Clemis School and Junior College, Chingavanam, Kottayam, Kerala.

== Death and Funeral ==
Clemis Abraham died at Lissie Hospital in Ernakulam on September 29, 2002. At the time of his death, Mor Clemis was the senior most Metropolitan of the Syriac Orthodox Church all over the world and the longest serving bishop in the history of the Malankara Church. His mortal remains were interred at St. John's Dayara Church, Chingavanam on October 1, 2002 after funeral rites were led by Baselios Thomas I, Mor Yulius Yeshu` Çiçek of Europe, and other Metropolitans of Malankara.

== Succession ==
'Malankara Syriac Orthodox Church Titles
Preceded by Mor Athanasius Paulose 1918–1953	Malankara Metropolitan of Jacobite Syrian Christian Church; 1957–1958	Succeeded by Mor Baselios Geevarghese II; 1958-1964
Preceded by	Knanaya Metropolitan of Knanaya Jacobite Archdiocese; 1951–2002	Succeeded by Severios Kuriakose

== See also ==
- Syriac Orthodox Church
- Jacobite Syrian Christian Church
- Severios Kuriakose
- Ivanios Kuriakose
- Gregorios Kuriakose
- Silvanos Ayub

'Malankara Syriac Orthodox Church Titles
Preceded by Mor Yulios Elias Qoro; Syriac Orthodox Patriarchal Delegates of India; 1953-1957	Malankara Metropolitan of Jacobite Syrian Christian Church; 1957–1958	Succeeded by Geevarghese II; 1958-1964
Preceded by Dioscoros Thomas	Knanaya Metropolitan of Knanaya Jacobite Archdiocese; 1951–2002	Succeeded by Severios Kuriakose
