= Baruch (surname) =

- Belle W. Baruch (1899–1964), American heiress, daughter of Bernard Baruch
- Bernard Baruch (1870–1965), American financier, stock market speculator, statesman, and presidential advisor
- Bertha Hirsch Baruch (1876–?), American writer and suffragette
- Dorothy Walter Baruch (1899–1962), American psychologist and children's book writer
- Franzisca Baruch (1901–1989) German-Israeli graphic designer
- Ruth-Marion Baruch (1922–1997), American photographer
- Yaakov Baruch (1982), Indonesian rabbi
