= Knanaya Archdiocese =

Knanaya Archdiocese either refers to:

- Syro-Malabar Catholic Archeparchy of Kottayam of the Knanaya Catholics or
- Malankara Syriac Knanaya Archdiocese of the Knanaya Jacobites.
