= Gregorios Kuriakose =

Syriac Orthodox bishop (born 1954)

Mor Gregorios Kuriakose
- Regional Metropolitan of Kallissery & Malabar Region
- Church: Syriac Orthodox Church in India
- Archdiocese: Malankara Syriac Knanaya Archdiocese
- See: Holy Apostolic See of Antioch & All East
- Appointed: 02 February 2007

Orders
- Ordination: 28 August 1980 (Kassisso/Priest) by Clemis Abraham
- Consecration: 2 February 2007 (Episcopo/Bishop) by Patriarch Ignatius Zakka I
- Rank: Archbishop

Personal details
- Born: January 16, 1954 Chaluparambil House, Mannar
- Education: B.D from Kimmage Mission Institute, Ireland, Post Graduation; Economics from Christian College, Indore M.Th from Paurasthya Vidyapeedom, Vadavathoor

Gregorios Kuriakose is an Indian bishop of the Malankara Syriac Orthodox Church. He is the bishop of the Malankara Syriac Knanaya Archdiocese.

== Education ==
Kuriakose received a Bachelor of Divinity (B.D) from Holy Ghost Missionary College, Kimmage Manor, Dublin, Ireland. and studied economics at Christian College, Indore. He received a Master of Theology (M.Th) from Paurasthya Vidyapeedom, Vadavathoor.

== See also ==
- Jacobite Syrian Christian Church
- Oriental Orthodox Church
- Saint Thomas Christians
