= Malankara Syriac Knanaya Archdiocese =

Malankara Syriac Orthodox Church Knanaya Archdiocese

Location
- Jurisdiction: Knanaya Community
- Ecclesiastical Province: Ranni, Kallissery, America, Canada & Europe

Leadership
- Patriarch: Ignatius Aphrem II
- Bishops: Severious Kuriakose; Gregorios Kuriakose; Ivanios Kuriakose; Silvanos Ayub

History
- Established: 1910
- First Hierarch: Severios Geevarghese

Information
- Denomination: Oriental Orthodox
- Church: Syriac Orthodox Church
- Affiliation: Malankara Syriac Orthodox Church
- Rite: West Syriac Rite
- Calendar: Gregorian Calendar
- Languages: Classical Syriac, Malayalam, and other languages
- Patron Saint: Thomas of Cana
- Seminary: St. Aphrem's Seminary, Chingavanam
- Cathedrals: St. Thomas Valiyapally, Ranni; St. Marys Valiyapally, Kallissery

The Malankara Syriac Knanaya Community are part of the larger Knanaya community who are descendants of an endogamous ethnic migrant group of Syriac-Jewish Christians who arrived and settled in Kerala in the 4th or 8th century.

In the year 345 according to the Malayalam calendar (Kollavarsham), Knai Thoma, a merchant, and 72 families from Edessa (modern-day Urfa) immigrated to Malankara (present-day Kerala) and established a community there. Among the group were priests, deacons and a bishop, Uraha Mar Ouseph (Bishop Joseph of Uraha/Urfa). Knai Thoma and his people were welcomed by Cheraman Perumal, the Chera Emperor of Kerala, and were given permission to settle down in Kodungalloor.

After the Coonen Cross Revolt (Oath of the Bent Cross), part of the Knanaya community joined Archdeacon Thomas. They later returned to West Syriac liturgical traditions brought to Malankara by them. This group remained under the patriarch of Antioch. Today they form part of the Knanaya Archdiocese of the Syriac Orthodox Church.

== List of Knanaya Syrian Church ==
The Knanaya Syrians claim that they are Jewish migrants who believed in the primacy of the patriarch of Antioch under the Syriac Orthodox Church. They have communities in Alappuzha, Pathanamthitta and Kottayam of Kerala and abroad.

- A total of129 churches are under Malankara Syriac Knanaya Archdiocese:
  - Chingavanam - 21
  - Kallisserry - 26
  - Ranni - 20
  - Bhagya Keralam - 6
  - Gulf Region - 7
  - UAE - 15
  - America, Canada, Australia, UK, Ireland and Europe - 34

== See also ==
- Syro-Malabar Catholic Archeparchy of Kottayam
- Jacobite Syrian Christian Church
- Malankara Orthodox Syrian Church
- Jewish Christianity
