= St. Mary's Cathedral, Kundara =

St.Mary's Jacobite Syrian Cathedral. Kundara
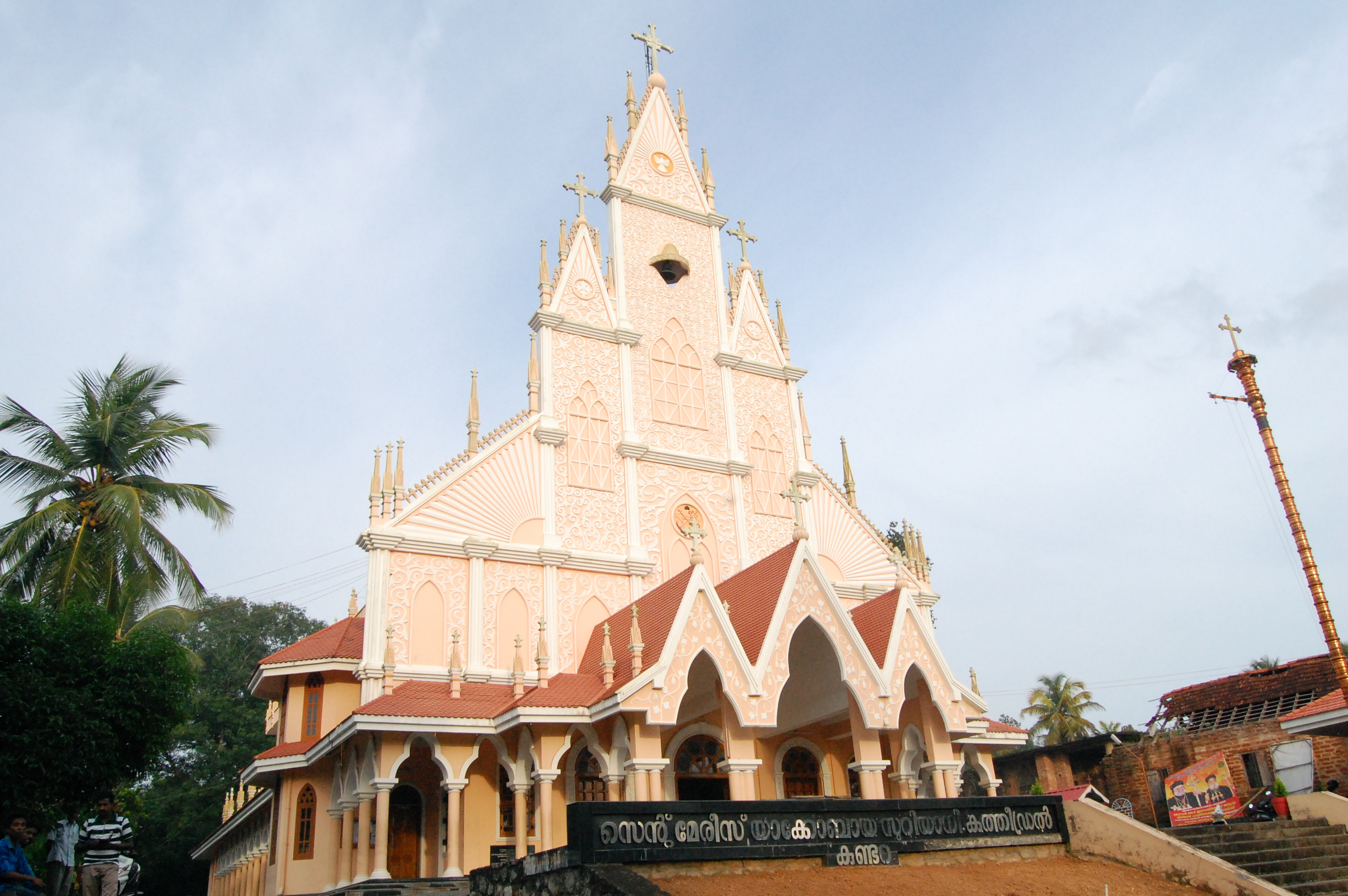
- St.Mary's Jacobite Syrian Cathedral. Kundara
- 8°58′13″N 76°40′11″E
- Location: Kundara, India
- Denomination: Jacobite Syriac Orthodox Church
- Tradition: Syriac Aramaic, Malayalam

History
- Founded: 1871
- Dedication: Saint Mary, Saint Peter, Saint Thomas, Saint George and Gregorios of Parumala

Administration
- Diocese: Kollam diocese

Clergy
- Vicar: Rev. Fr. Basil Jacob

St. Mary's Jacobite Syrian Cathedral is a Jacobite Syrian Christian Church under the Syriac Orthodox Church of Antioch, located in Kollam District, Kerala, India. It is a Pakalomattam Parish Church migrated from Kuravilangad.

== Gallery ==
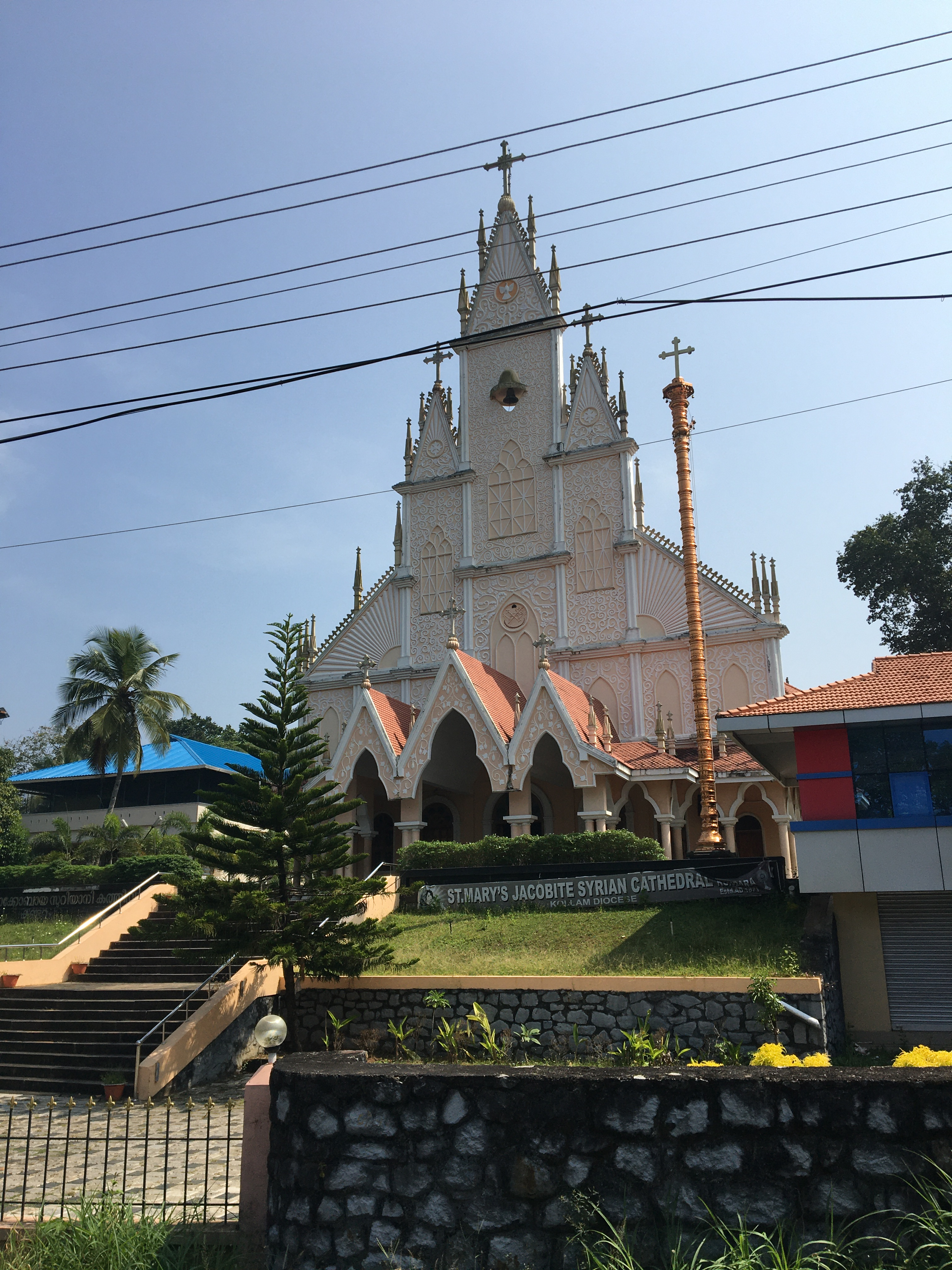
Front View of St. Mary's Cathedral, Kundara

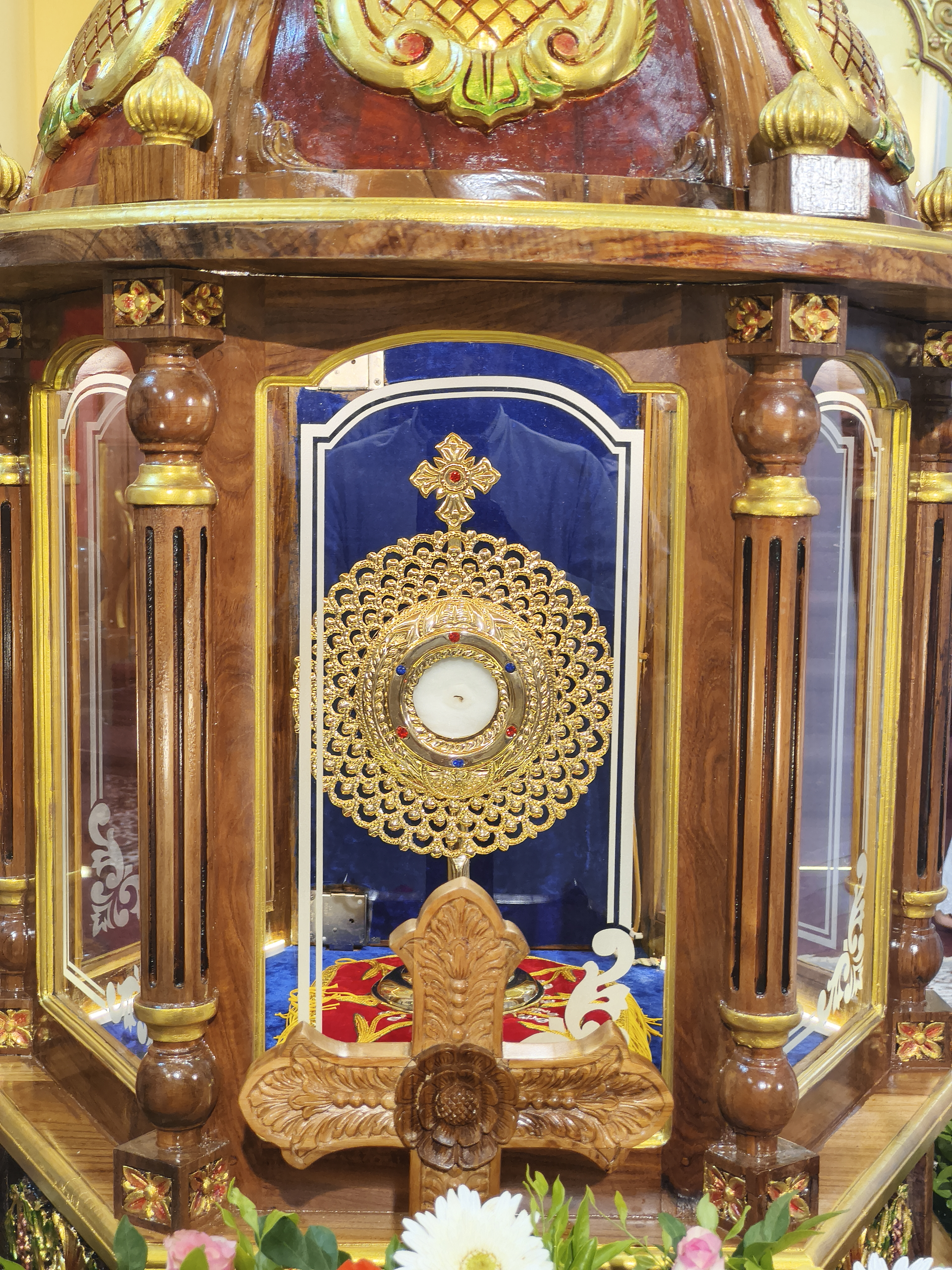
Holy Girdle of St. Mary's Jacobite Syrian Cathedral, Kundara

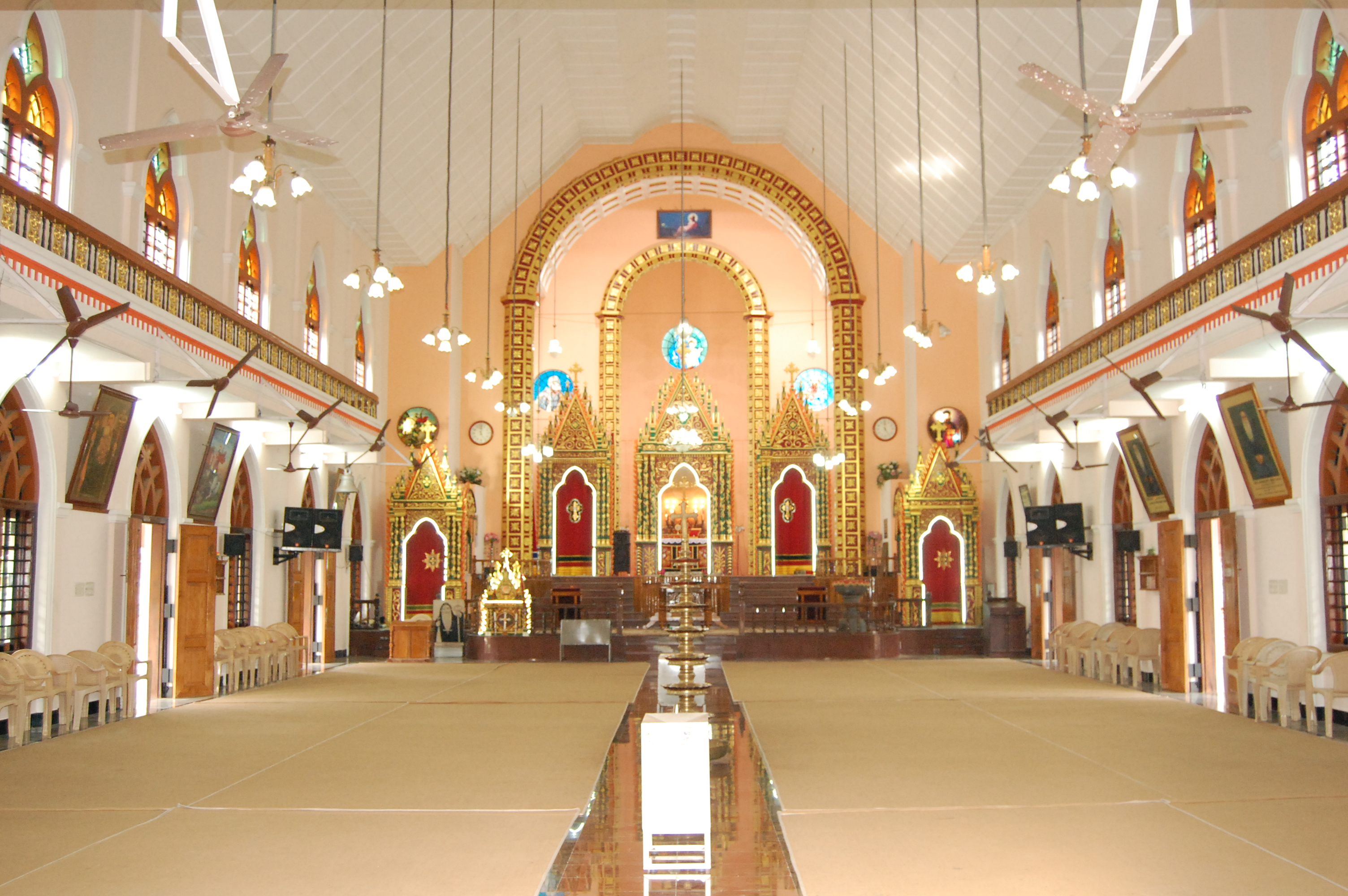
Holy Altar of St. Mary's Cathedral, Kundara

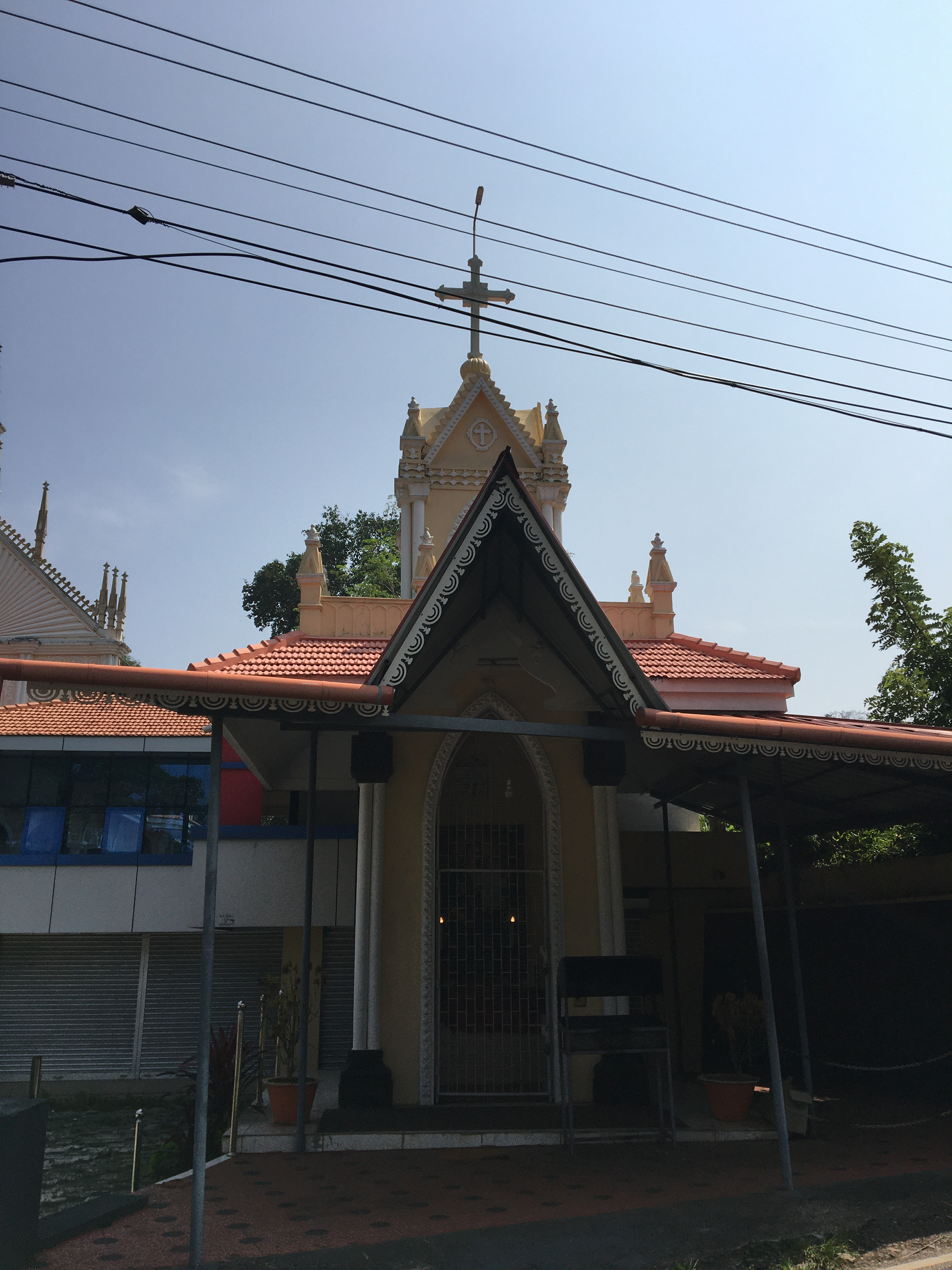
Shrine of St. Mary's Cathedral, Kundara

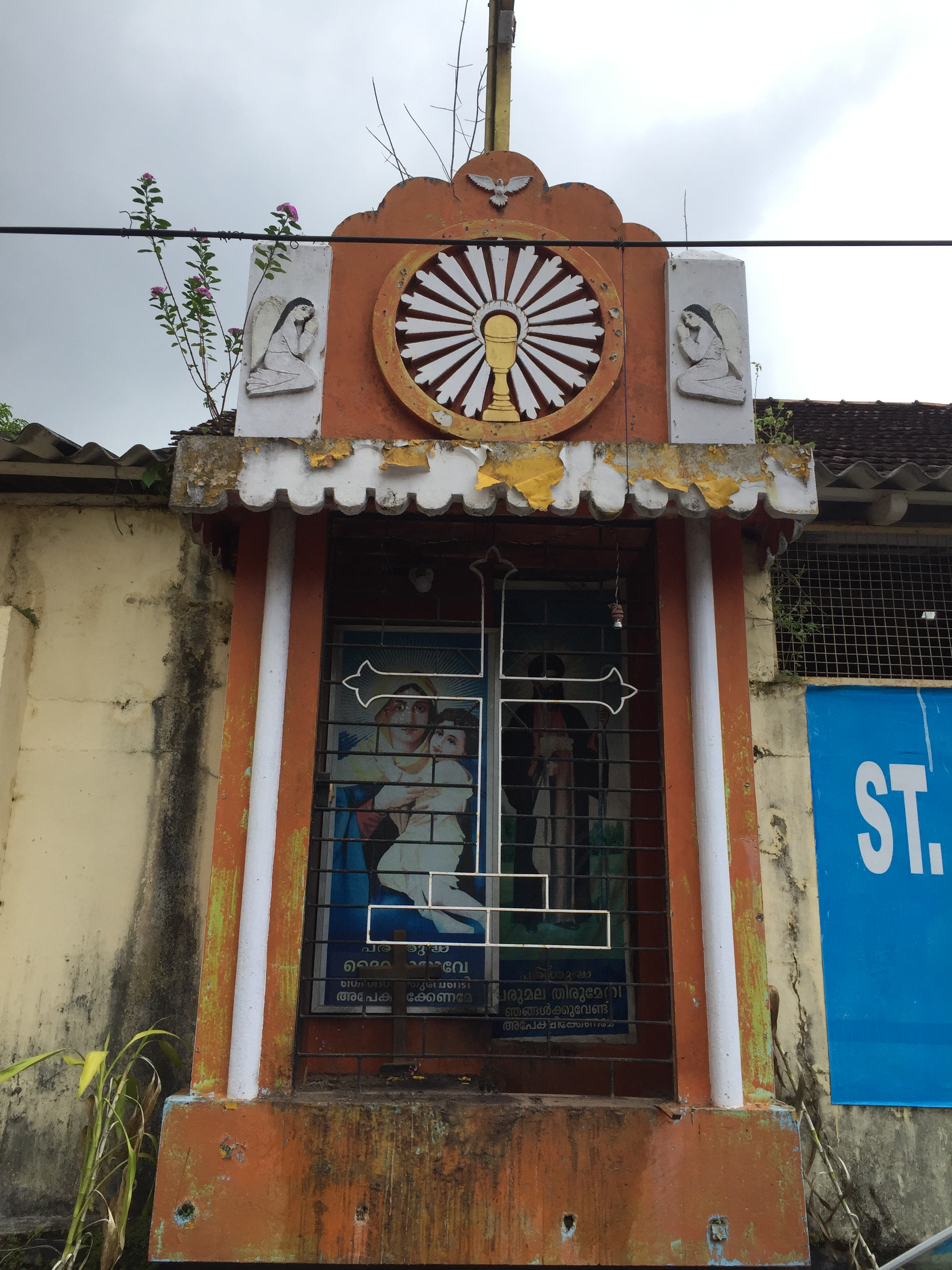
Shrine of Old Parish Chapel

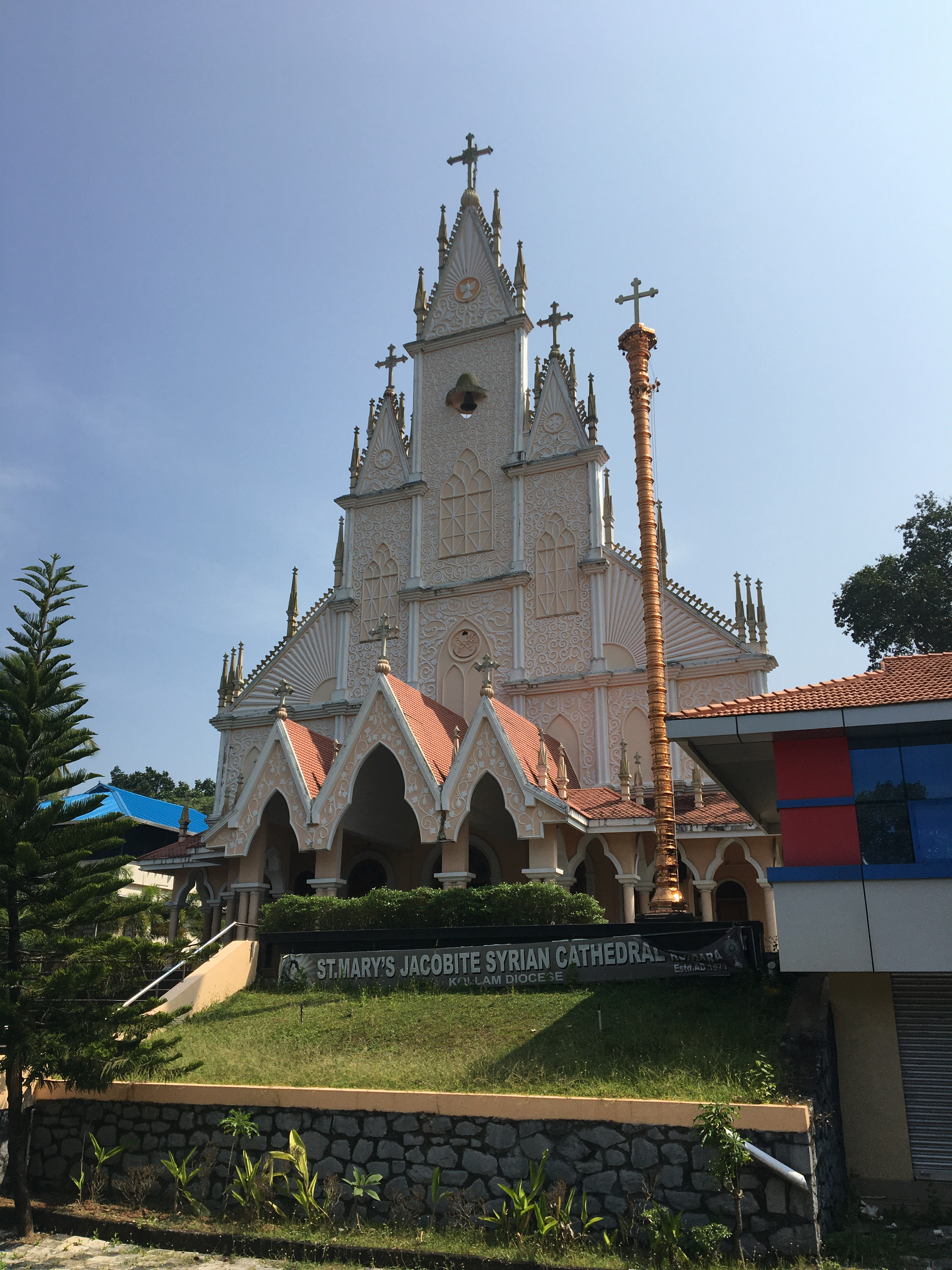
Side view of St. Mary's Cathedral, Kundara

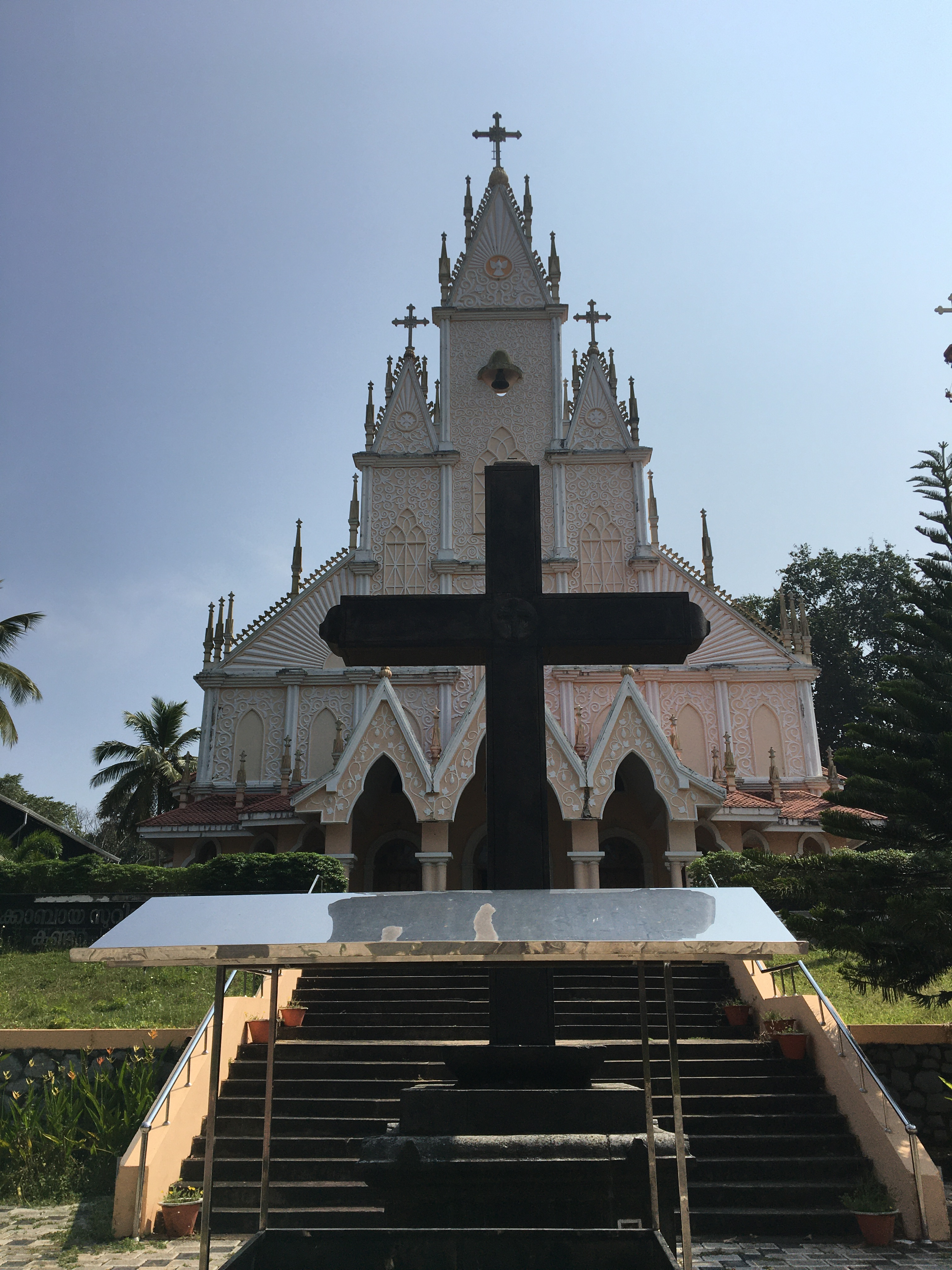
Stone Cross of St. Mary's Cathedral Kundara

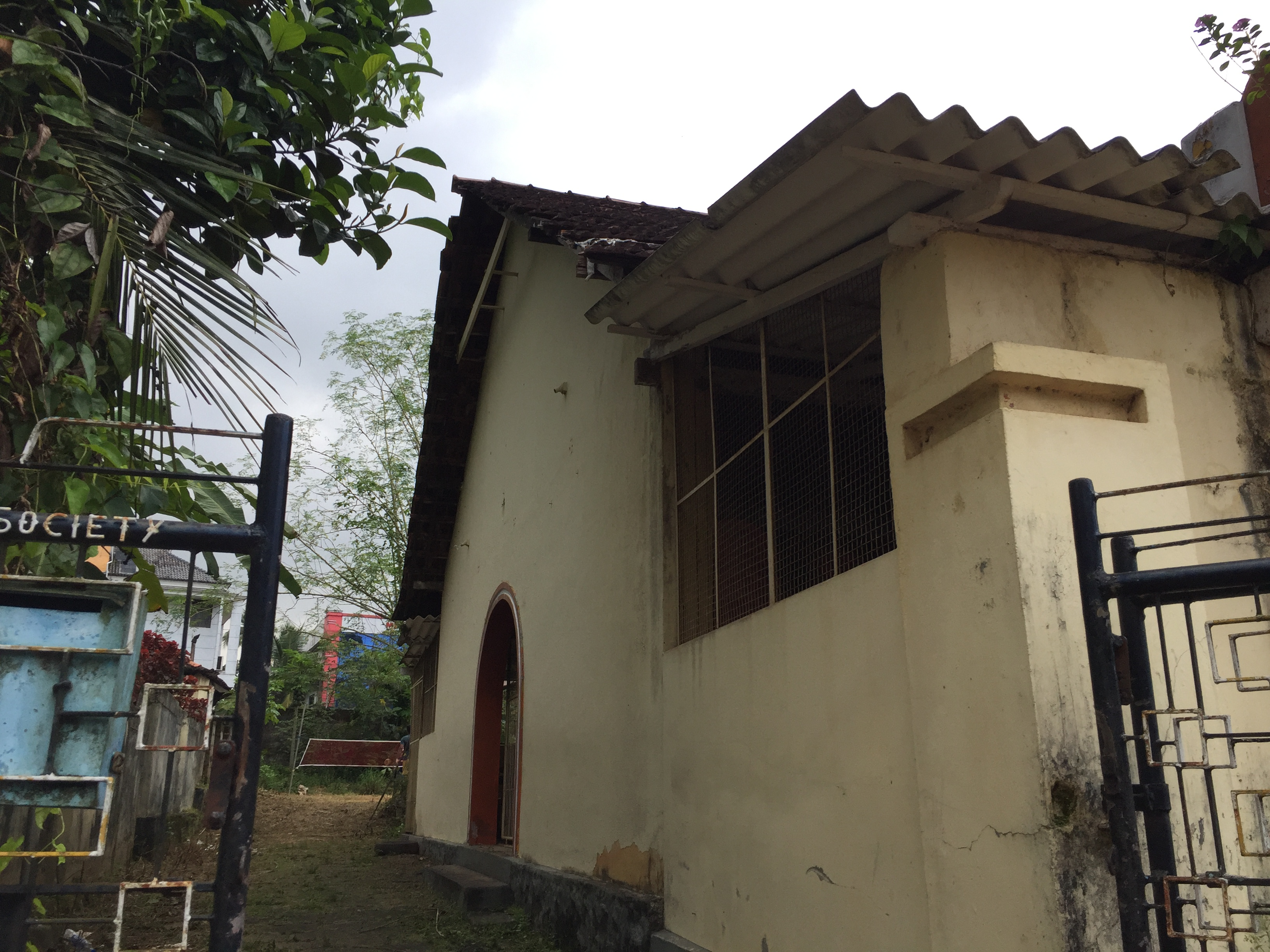
Old Parish Chapel of St. Mary's Cathedral, Kundara

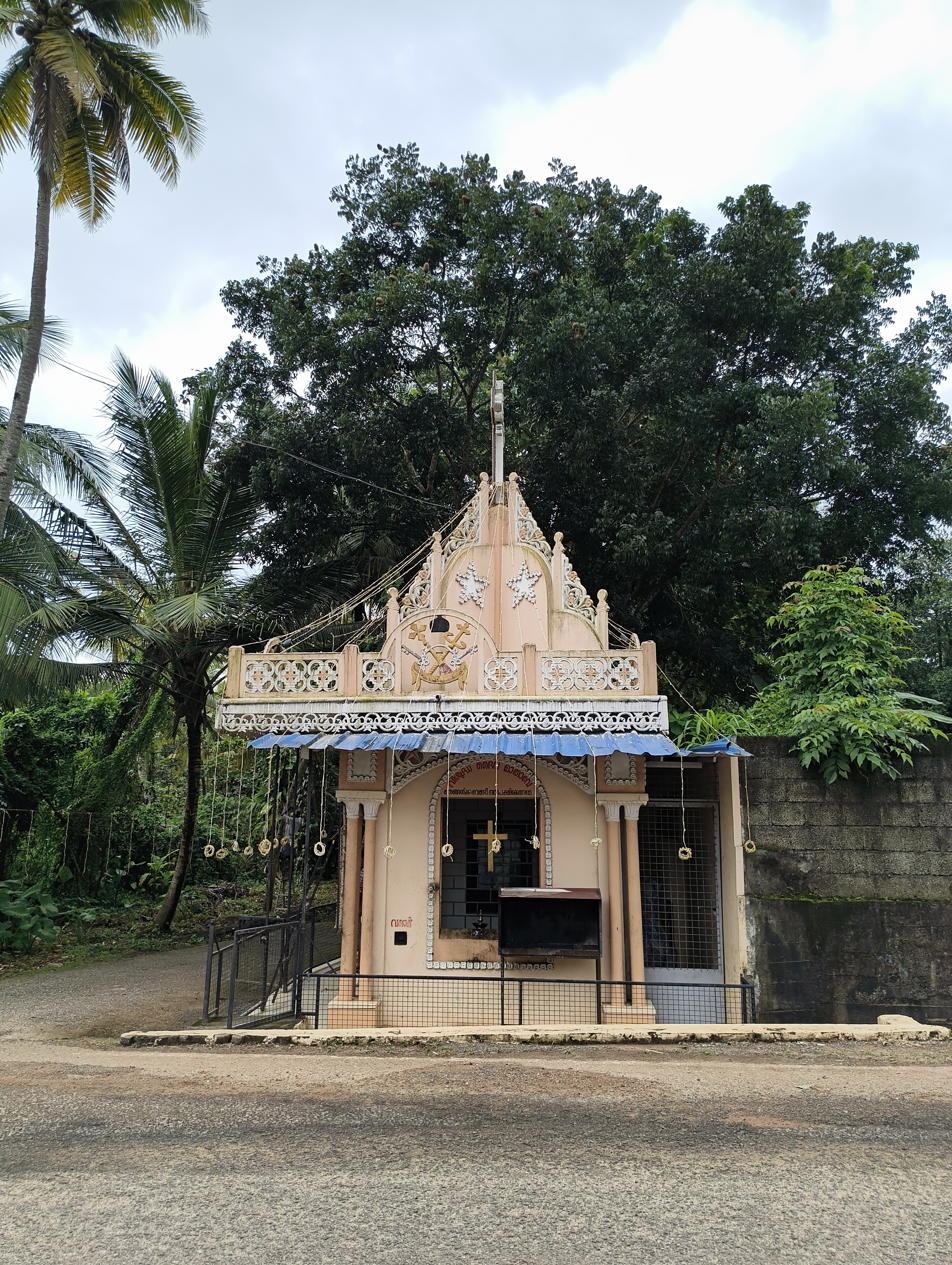
St. Mary's Shrine, Punnamukku

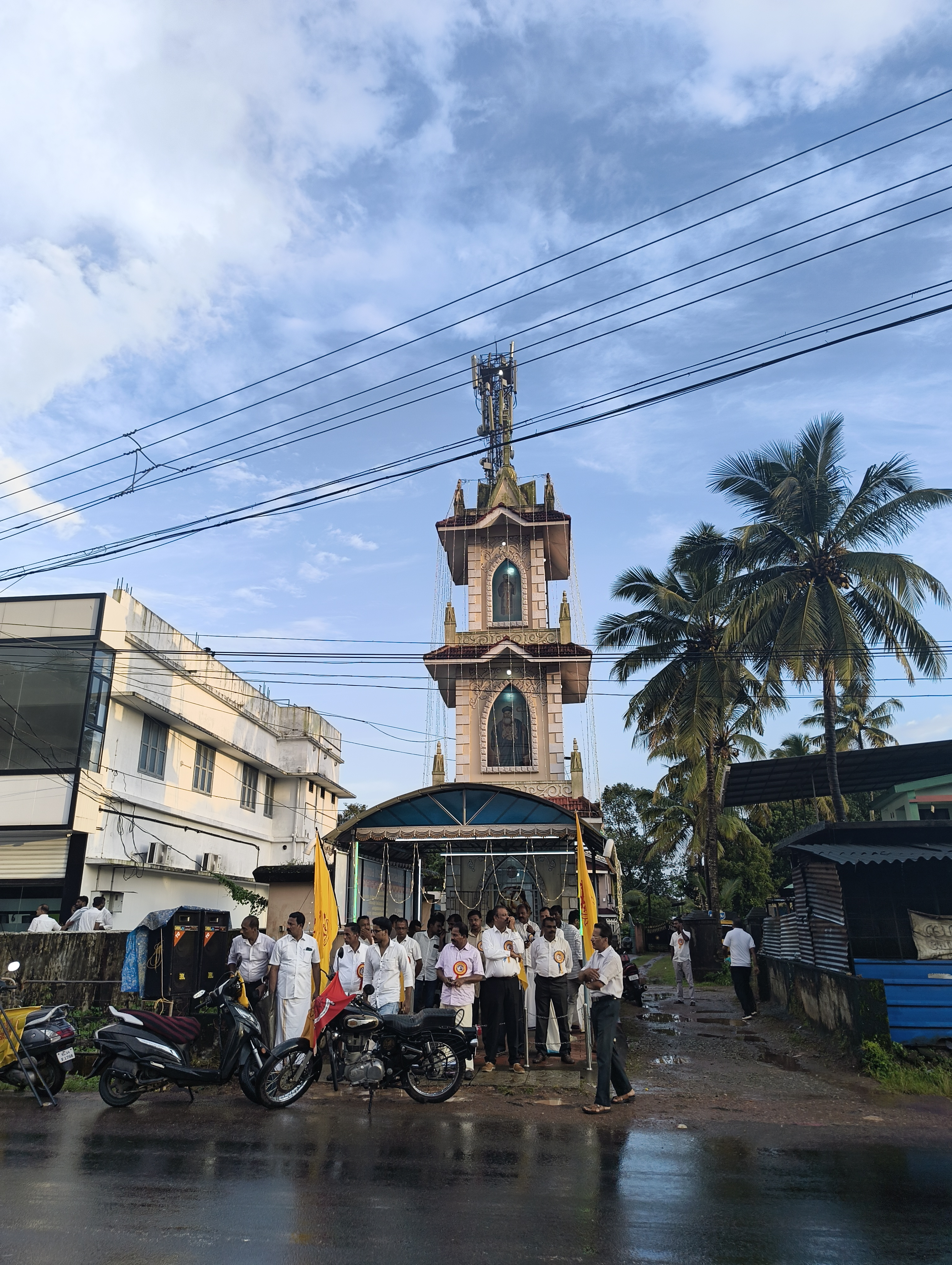
St. Mary's Shrine, Nedumpaikulam

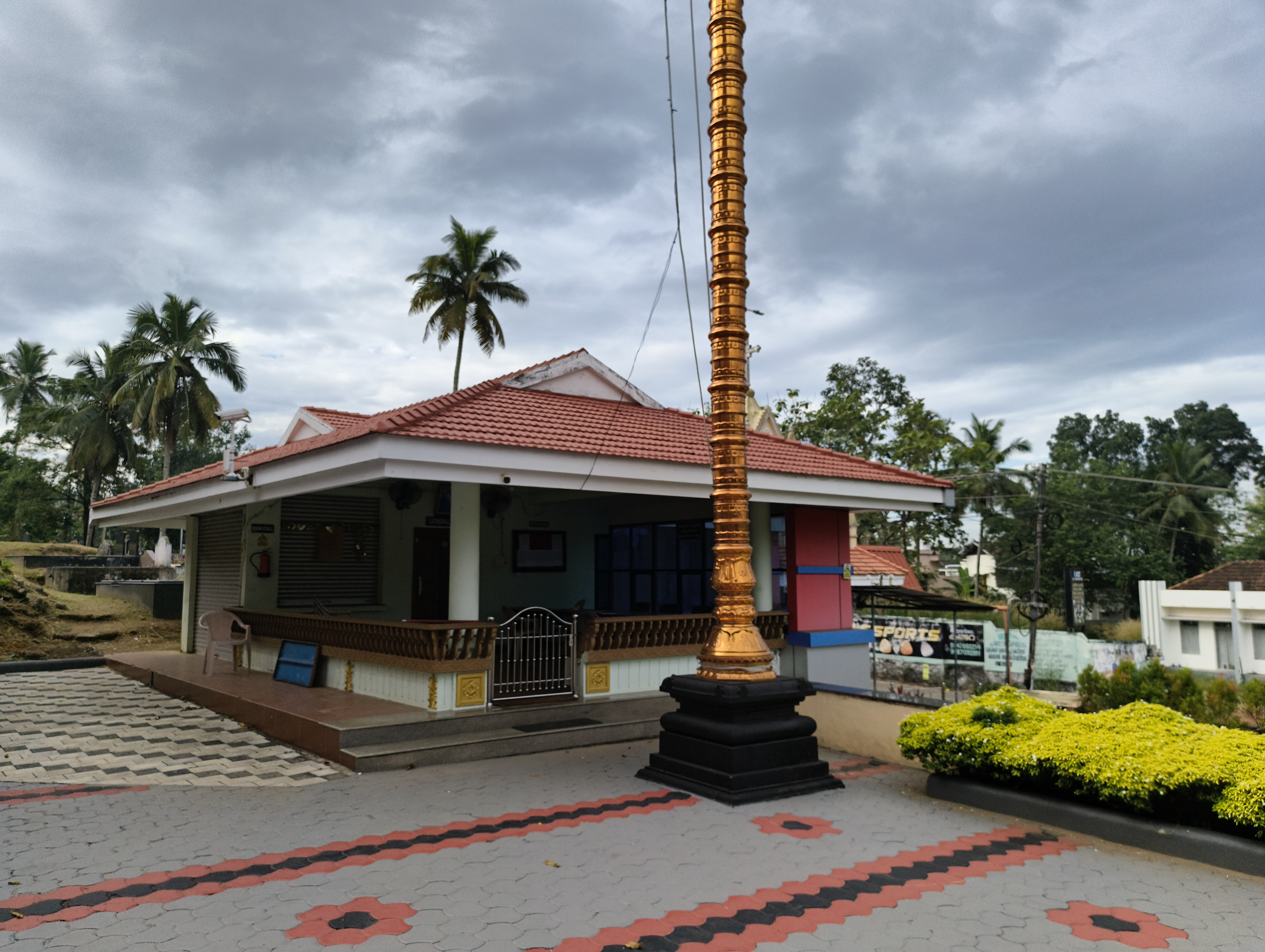
St. Mary's Cathedral Office

== See also ==
- Pakalomattom family
- Syriac Orthodox Church
- Malankara Church
- Jacobite Syrian Christian Church
