= Severios Kuriakose =

Indian Syriac Orthodox Metropolitan Archbishop (born 1959)

His Grace Kuriakose Mor Severios
- Archbishop
- Church: Syrian Orthodox Church in India
- Archdiocese: Malankara Syriac Knanaya Archdiocese
- See: Holy Apostolic See of Antioch & All East
- Installed: 15 January 2004
- Predecessor: Mor Clemis Abraham

Orders
- Ordination: 4 February 1990 (Kasheesho/Priest) by Mor Clemis Abraham
- Consecration: 15 January 2004 (Episcopa/Bishop) by Patriarch Ignatius Zakka I
- Rank: Archbishop

Personal details
- Born: May 21, 1959 Kottayam
- Parents: Mr. Kunjavarachan and Mrs. Mariamma Edavazhikkal
- Education: P.G History from CMS College Kottayam, P.G English from St. Berchmans College; Degree in theology from Maynooth University P.G Degree in theology from Pourasthya Vidya Peeth Vadavathoor
- Alma mater: Maynooth University, Mahatma Gandhi University, Kerala

Mor Severios Kuriakose (born Kuriakose Abraham Edavazhickel on 21 May 1959) is an Indian prelate of the Malankara Syriac Knanaya Archdiocese, which is an autonomous jurisdiction within the Syriac Orthodox Church.

== Education ==
Mor Severios Kuriakose has a Masters in History from CMS College Kottayam and Masters in English from St. Berchmans College. He joined the Maynooth University in Ireland for degree in theological studies. Later he obtained a Masters in theology from Pourasthya Vidyapeetham in Vadavathoor.

== Ordination ==
Following the demise of the former head of the Malankara Syriac Knanaya Archdiocese, Mor Clemis Abraham, Fr. Kuriakose Abraham (Roy Achan) was elected and approved by the Syriac Patriarch of Antioch and All East, Moran Mor Ignatius Zakka I Iwas to be the next head of the Archdiocese.

== Patriarchal Relations ==
In recent decades, there have been disputes regarding the extent of the Patriarch of Antioch's authority over the Knanaya Archdiocese. The Patriarch has suspended Mor Severios, on charges of not setting a good example in the clergy and believers, challenging the authority of the Holy throne of Antioch and lack of remorse. The suspension of Mor Severios Kuriakose by the Patriarchate in 2024 was stayed by a Munsiff court in Kottayam upon a case filed by members of the Archdiocese.

'Malankara Syriac Orthodox Church Titles
| Preceded by Clemis Abraham | Knanaya Metropolitan of Knanaya Jacobite Archdiocese; 2004–Present | Succeeded by Incumbent |
