= Baruch =

Baruch may refer to:

== People ==
- Baruch (given name), a given name of Hebrew origin; includes a list of notable people with the name
- Baruch (surname), includes a list of notable people with the name

== Other uses ==
- Book of Baruch, also called 1 Baruch, a deuterocanonical book of the Bible
- 2 Baruch, also called the Syriac Apocalypse of Baruch
- 3 Baruch, also called the Greek Apocalypse of Baruch
- 4 Baruch, also known as the Paraleipomena of Jeremiah
- Baruch College, part of the City University of New York system, named after Bernard Baruch
- Baruch Plan, a proposed U.S. atomic energy plan following World War II by Bernard Baruch
- Bharuch also Baruch, a city in Gujarat, India
