= Ayyanadikal Thiruvadikal =

9th-century chieftain or ruler of Venad

- Ruler of Venad
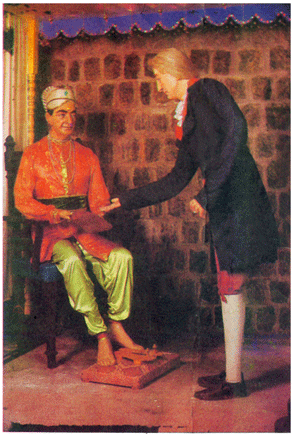
- Ayyan Adikal gifting the Tharisappalli or Syrian copper plates to Maruvan Sapir Iso (modern depiction)

Ruler of Venad
- Reign: c. 849 CE
- Junior Holder: Rama Thiruvadikal
- Religion: Hinduism

Ayyanadikal Thiruvadikal (fl. c. 849 CE; also segmented as Ayyan Adikal Tiruvadikal) was a 9th-century chieftain or ruler of Venad under the suzerainty of the medieval Chera state of Kerala in southern India. He is chiefly remembered for founding and developing the port of Kollam (on the Malabar Coast) with the help of Indian Ocean merchants from the Middle East.

Ayyanadikal's policy towards West Asian overseas traders, as revealed by the plates, offers valuable insight into the principles and practices of statecraft in 9th-century Kerala.

== Career ==
Ayyanadikal Thiruvadikal, with "Thiruvadikal" being a honorific royal title, is the earliest known ruler of the country of Venad (southern Kerala).

The Tharisapalli Copper plates notably acknowledge Chera suzerainty, as Ayyanadikal dates the charter according to the regnal years of the Chera ruler of Mahodayapuram-Kodungallur (the fifth regnal year of Sthanu Ravi Kulasekhara; corresponding to c. 849 CE). The junior Venad ruler ("Ilankuru" or junior right holder) under Ayyanadikal appears to have been a certain "Rama Thiruvadikal", while Chera royal Vijayaraga served as the royal representative or the Koyil Adhikarikal in Venad. Ayyanadikal was assisted in governance by local Venad officials such as the adhikarar, the prakrithi, and the Six Hundred (the Arunnutruvar), commander of the Nair militia of Venad.

=== The Tharisapalli Copper Plates ===
Much of what is known about Ayyanadikal derives from the Tharisapalli or Quilon Syrian Copper Plates, a royal charter issued at Kollam (Quilon) in approximately 849 CE. The copper plate grant bestowed extensive lands (as an "attipperu") and a range of commercial privileges upon the Christian church and community at Kollam and is associated with the merchant magnate Maruvan Sapir Iso. The inscription constitutes one of the most important sources for the political, religious, and commercial history of early medieval Kerala and south India. It demonstrates how shared economic interests fostered a vibrant cultural milieu in early medieval Kerala, characterized by cultural hybridity and confluence.

Through this charter, Ayyanadikal granted an exceptional degree of socio-economic autonomy to the Christian merchant community. The merchant community and the guilds Anjuman (Anchuvannam) and Manigramam, tenants of the Kollam "nagara" under the "karanmai" tenure, were entrusted with extensive authority over affairs such as the regulation of market prices, weights, and measures within the city. They were further exempted from obligations such as cart taxes, sales taxes, and the customary "one-sixtieth" duties imposed on goods entering and leaving the port city.
