= Dorothy W. Baruch =

American psychologist

- Born: Dorothy Walter; August 5, 1899; San Francisco, California, U.S.
- Died: September 4, 1962 (aged 63); Los Angeles, California, U.S.
- Education: Bryn Mawr College; University of Southern California; Whittier College (M.E.); Claremont Graduate University (Ph.D.)
- Occupations: Psychologist; children's book author

Dorothy Walter Baruch (August 5, 1899 – September 4, 1962) was an American psychologist and children's book author. She studied children's language acquisition and wrote about childhood development whilst also supplying fiction for children.

== Life ==
Baruch was born in San Francisco to Clarence and Rosalie (née Neustadter) Walter. From 1917 to 1919, she attended Bryn Mawr College, and from 1919 to 1920 she attended the University of Southern California. She went on to attend Whittier College, and earned a M.E. in 1931. She received a Ph.D. from Claremont Graduate University in 1937. She was the first person to receive a doctoral degree from Claremont College. In 1919 she married Herbert Baruch, of the Herbert M. Baruch Corporation, and they had two children, Herbert & Nancy. They divorced, and, in 1946, she married Dr. Hyman Miller. In 1962, Dorothy Baruch died in Los Angeles, aged 63.

== Career ==
Baruch was the founder and director the Grammercy Cooperative Nursery School, and also did groundbreaking experimental work in children's language acquisition at the Normandie Nursery School.

In 1928, she worked with the National Council of Jewish Women and directed their parent education department. From 1930 to 1940, she was a professor of education at Whittier College. From 1937 to 1941, Baruch headed the public relations program for the National Association for Nursery Education. She opened a private practice in 1946 as a consulting psychologist, and continued to lecture on child psychology and education. She wrote many stories for children, including more than twenty books of fiction for children. She also wrote eleven nonfiction books, in addition to numerous psychological journal articles.

== Books ==
- (1927) A Day with Betty Anne: Small Stories for Small Children and for Their Mothers (illustrated by Winifred Bromhall)
- (1939) Parents and Children Go to School: Adventuring in Nursery School and Kindergarten
- (1941) Personal Problems of Everyday Life: Practical Aspects of Mental Hygiene (written with Lee Edward Travis)
- (1942) You, Your Children and War
- (1944) A Primer for and About Parents: Parents Can Be People
- (1946) You’re Out of the Service Now: The Veteran’s Guide to Civilian Life (written with Lee Edward Travis)
- (1946) Glass House of Prejudice
- (1949) New Ways in Discipline: You and Your Child Today
- (1952) One Little Boy (written with Hyman Miller)
- (1953) How to Live with Your Teenager
- (1956) The Practice of Psychosomatic Medicine as Illustrated in Allergy (written with Hyman Miller)
- (1959) New Ways in Sex Education: A Guide for Parents and Teachers
- (1961) Kappa's Tug-of-War with Big Brown Horse: The Story of a Japanese Water Imp
- (1962) Sex in Marriage: New Understandings (written with Hyman Miller)
