= Bertha Hirsch Baruch =

German writer from the USA

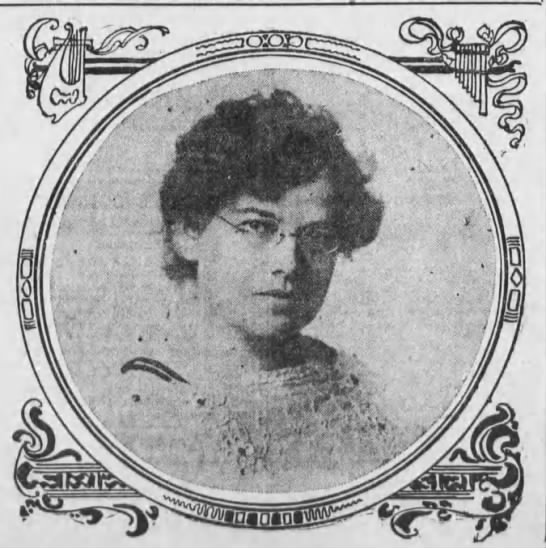
Bertha Hirsch Baruch

Bertha Hirsch Baruch was a German-born American writer, social worker, and suffragist.

Baruch was born in the Province of Posen, Germany. She immigrated to New London, Connecticut, United States, with her father in 1876. Baruch wrote poetry as an adolescent and had been encouraged by Rose Hawthorne Lathrop in her literary efforts. Active in College Settlement and university extension work, she attended Pennsylvania University and Yale. She later worked on the editorial staff for the Los Angeles Times. In 1906 she lived at 1168 W. 36th St., Los Angeles, California.

Baruch was active in the women's suffrage movement. She became the county president of the Los Angeles Suffrage Association in 1905 when two conventions were hosted:

- the Women's Parliament, October 10–11, and
- the county convention of the Equal Suffrage League October 12.

In 1908 Baruch became the treasurer of the Los Angeles Jewish Women's Foreign Relief Association. She started a branch of the Optimist Club in Los Angeles and was the third woman to hold office in the organization. Baruch was also the founder of the Los Angeles branch of the National Council of Jewish Women.

She published Dress as a Social Factor in 1912.
