= Holy Matrimony =

Holy matrimony is a phrase used to describe Christian marriage. It may also refer to:

- Holy Matrimony (1943 film), a comedy starring Monty Woolley and Gracie Fields
- Holy Matrimony (1994 film), a comedy directed by Leonard Nimoy
- "Holy Matrimony!", an episode of Pokémon
- "Holy Matrimony" (Brothers & Sisters episode), an episode of Brothers & Sisters
