= Silvanos Ayub =

Syriac Orthodox Church Archbishop

His Eminence Mor Dr. Silvanos Ayub
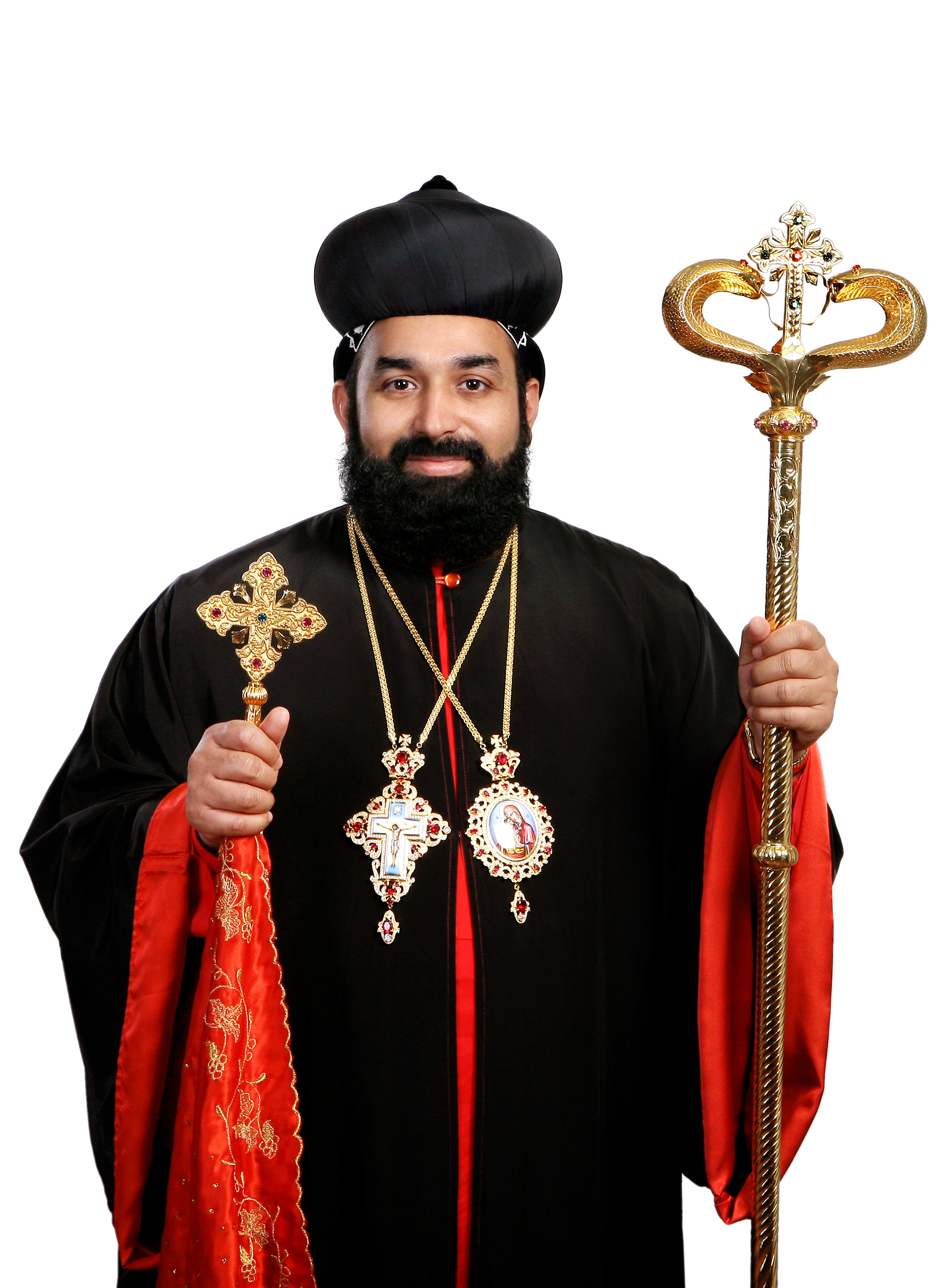
- Dr. Ayub Mor Silvanos
- Church: Syriac Orthodox Church
- Diocese: Knanaya Archdiocese
- See: Holy Apostolic See of Antioch & All East

Orders
- Ordination: 06 August 1999 (Kassisso) by Clemis Abraham Metropolitan
- Consecration: 11 June 2008 by Patriarch Ignatius Zakka I
- Rank: Metropolitan

Personal details
- Born: April 18, 1972
- Denomination: Syriac Orthodox Church of Antioch (Knanaya Archdiocese)
- Residence: New York, United States of America
- Parents: Thottathil Mr. K. O. Uthuppan & Mrs. Mariamma Uthuppan
- Motto: Service to Humanity

Ayub Silvanos (formerly known as Joby Uthuppan and Job Thottathi) is a Regional Metropolitan of the Malankara Syrian Knanaya Archdiocese.

Raised in a devout Syrian Knanaya Orthodox Christian household, Silvanos was deeply influenced by the religious environment of his upbringing. His early involvement in church life, particularly his service as an altar boy, fostered a strong sense of spiritual purpose and devotion. Silvanos completed his schooling and pre-university studies in the Malabar region of Kerala. Despite expectations to pursue a secular profession, he felt a vocational calling to dedicate his life to religious service. After a period of discernment, he decided to become a Dayara priest (a celibate, monastic priest) in the Syrian Orthodox tradition. His spiritual mentor, Chief Metropolitan His Eminence Mor Clemis Abraham, advised him to complete undergraduate studies before entering theological formation. Following this guidance, Silvanos pursued theological studies at the Theological College in Serampore, Calcutta (now Serampore College, West Bengal, India). His academic and spiritual training at Serampore deepened his understanding of Christian ministry and theology. He received the first four minor orders of ordination in November 1995, followed by the fifth order in May 1997. In June 1999, he was ordained as a full deacon, and on 6 August 1999, he was consecrated as an unmarried priest (Dayara Kassisso) by His Eminence Mor Clemis Abraham, Chief Metropolitan of the East. Since ordination, Silvanos has served in various pastoral, liturgical, and educational capacities within the Syrian Orthodox Church across India, the United Kingdom, and the United States. His ministry has focused on pastoral care, and community service. He earned a Master’s degree in Divinity and later a Ph.D., which contributed to his theological and pastoral development. Silvanos also completed Clinical Pastoral Education (CPE) training in the United States and became a Board Certified Chaplain through the Board of Chaplaincy Certification Inc. (BCCI).
