= Ivanios Kuriakose =

His Grace Mor Ivanios Kuriakose Auxiliary Metropolitan of the Knanaya Archdiocese in charge of Ranni Region
- Church: Syrian Orthodox Church
- Diocese: Knanaya Archdiocese
- See: Holy Apostolic See of Antioch & All East

Orders
- Ordination: 15 August 1993 (Kassisso) by Clemis Abraham Metropolitan
- Consecration: 11 June 2008 by Patriarch Ignatius Zakka I
- Rank: Metropolitan

Personal details
- Born: June 9, 1964
- Parents: Kolath Mr.K G Abraham and Mrs.Thankamma
- Education: P.G from Mahatma Gandhi University, Kottayam U.G from Kerala University Theological Studies from Vidyajyoti College of Theology, New Delhi

Mor Ivanios Kuriakose (born June 9, 1964) is a Syriac Orthodox bishop, currently auxiliary Metropolitan of Knanaya Archdiocese in charge of the Ranni region.

== Education ==
Kuriakose received his undergraduate education at Kerala University, postgraduate education at Mahatma Gandhi University, Kottayam, and theological education at Vidyajyoti College of Theology.
