= Thumpamon Orthodox Diocese =

Diocese of the Malankara Orthodox Syrian Church in India

Diocese of Thumpamon

Orthodox
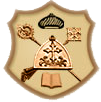
- Catholicate Emblem

Location
- Country: India
- Territory: Thumpamon
- Metropolitan: H. G. Abraham Mar Seraphim
- Headquarters: Basil Aramana, Pathanamthitta - 689 645

Information
- First holder: Konattu Geevarghese Mar Yulios
- Rite: Malankara Rite
- Established: 1876, by Ignatius Peter IV
- Diocese: Thumpamon Diocese
- Parent church: Malankara Orthodox Syrian Church

Website
- Thumpamon Diocese

Thumpamon Diocese is one of the 32 dioceses of the Malankara Orthodox Syrian Church. The diocese was created after the Mulanthuruthy Synod in 1876. H.G. Abraham Mar Seraphim is the Metropolitan of the diocese. The head office is located in St. Basil Aramana, Pathanamthitta. The diocese was named Thumpamon Diocese, opted from "Thumpamon pally" where St.Gregorious of Parumala (Geevarghese Mar Gregorios) had lived his ministerial life and had been in the administration of Thumpamon diocese.

== History ==
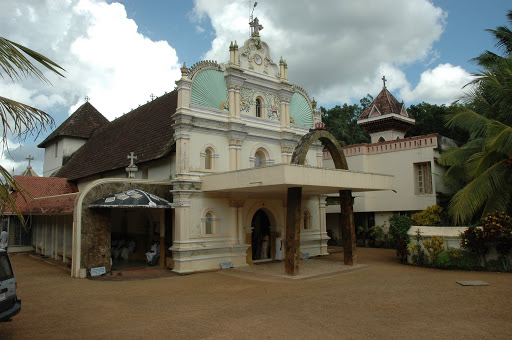
St. Mary’s Orthodox Cathedral, Thumpamon (valiya palli), Head Church of Thumpamon diocese.

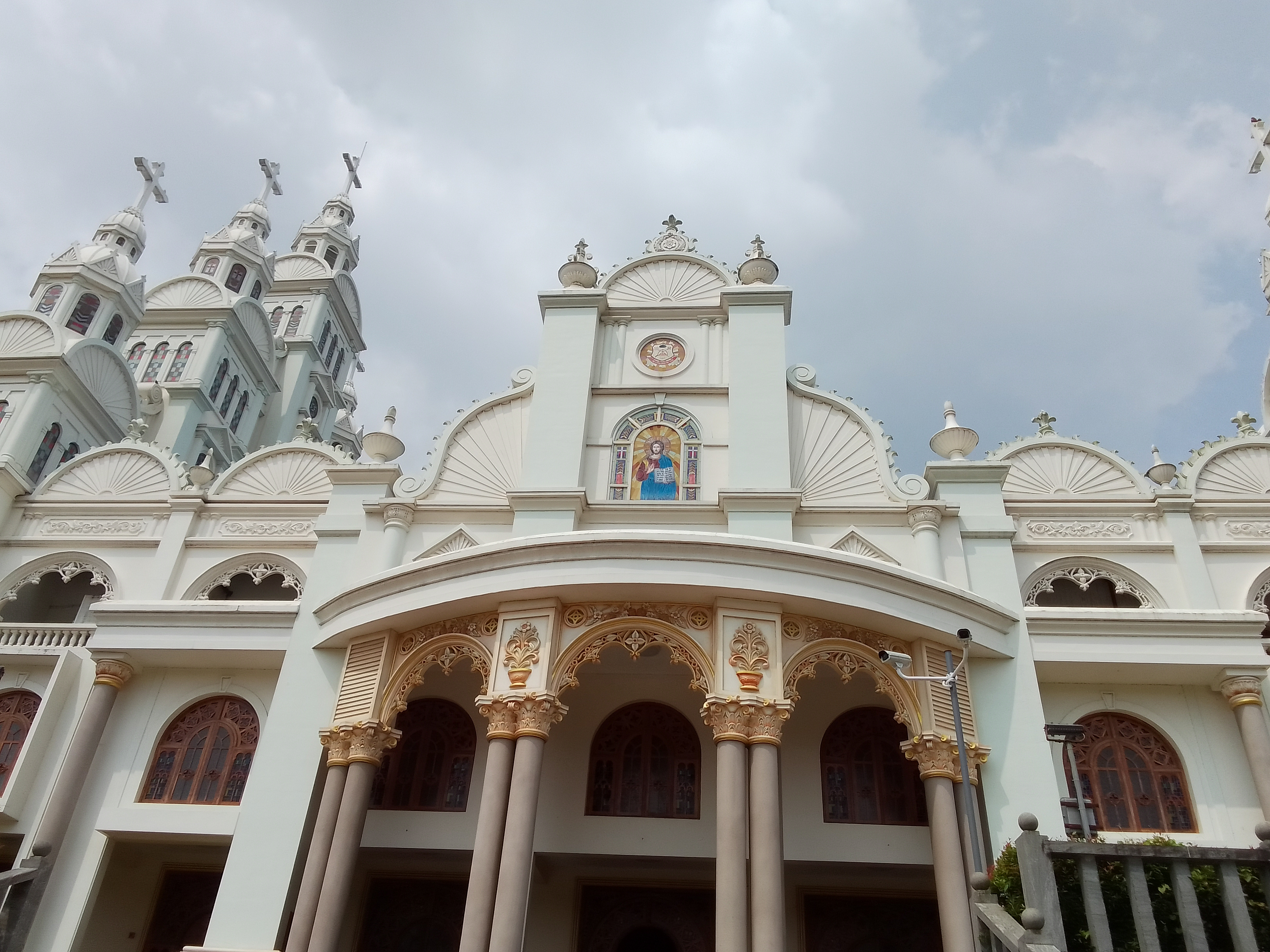
St. Stephen Orthodox Syrian Church, makkankunnu

Thumpamon is one of the seven dioceses created after the Mulanthuruthy Synod conducted under the leadership of Ignatius Peter III, Patriarch of Antioch in 1876. Others are Kottayam, Kandanadu, Angamali, Niranam, Kollam, Kochi. The diocese was created with 21 churches. Konatu Geevarghese Mar Yulios was the first metropolitan and led the diocese from 1876 to 1884. After this Parumala Thirumeni led diocese from 1884 to 1902. Thumpamon English Middle School was founded at this time. In 1913, Yuyakim Mar Evanios became metropolitan. In 1930, Puthencavu Mar Philexinos become metropolitan. During this time, many institutions were founded under the diocese.

The Bishop's house (Aramana) of the diocese was built by Puthencav kochu Thirumeni (Geevarghese Mar Philoxenos) who was also the founder of the then Catholicate High School, at present known as Catholicate College which became the blessing and guiding path of education for the people of Pathanamthitta.

Daniel Mar Philexinos led the diocese from 1953 to 1990 December. Philipos Mar Yusebios became assistant metropolitan in 1985, and metropolitan in 1991. Dionysious V, Dionysious VI, Baselios Geevarghese II, Baselios Augen I led the diocese for short periods at different times. In 1992, there were 101 parishes and 12 chapels in the diocese.

== Diocesan Metropolitans ==
Thumpamon Orthodox Diocesan Metropolitan
From	Until	Metropolitan	Notes
03-Dec-1876	1883	Konattu Geevarghese Mar Yulios	1st Metropolitan of the diocese
1883	1902	Chathuruthiyil Geevarghese Mar Gregorios	2nd Metropolitan of the diocese
1902	1909	Pulikkottil Joseph Mar Dionysious II (Dionysious V)	3rd Metropolitan of the diocese, Ruled as Malankara Metropolitan
1909	1913	Geevarghese Mar Dionysius of Vattasseril (Dionysius VI)	4th Metropolitan of the diocese, Ruled as Malankara Metropolitan
1913	1925	Karavattu Yuyakkim Mar Ivanios	5th Metropolitan of the diocese
1925	1929	Kallasseril Geevarghese Mar Gregorios (Later Baselios Geevarghese II)	6th Metropolitan of the diocese
1930	1934	Geevarghese Mar Dionysius of Vattasseril (Dionysius VI)	Ruled again as Malankara Metropolitan
1934	1951	Kizhakkethalakkal Geevarghese Mar Philexinos	7th Metropolitan of the diocese
1951	1953	Cheruvillil Augen Mar Thimotheos (Later Baselios Augen I)	8th Metropolitan of the diocese
1953	1960	Baselios Geevarghese II Catholicos	Ruled again as Malankara Metropolitan
1960	13-Dec-1990	Daniel Mar Philexinos	9th Metropolitan of the diocese
1991	2009	Philipose Mar Eusebius	10th Metropolitan of the diocese
2009	14-Sep-2023	Perumethmannil Kuriakose Mar Clemis	11th Metropolitan of the diocese
14-Sep-2023	27-Sep-2023	Baselios Marthoma Mathews III Catholicos	12th Metropolitan of the diocese, Ruled as Malankara Metropolitan
27-Sep-2023	Incumbent	Abraham Mar Seraphim	13th Metropolitan of the diocese

Assistant Metropolitan
From	Until	Metropolitan	Notes
1930	1934	Kizhakkethalakkal Geevarghese Mar Philexinos	Assistant metropolitan
1953	1960	Daniel Mar Philexinos	Assistant metropolitan
1985	1990	Philippose Mar Eusebios	Assistant metropolitan
01-Jan-2023	27-Sep-2023	Abraham Mar Seraphim	Assistant metropolitan

== Parishes ==
- Amakkunnu St.George Orthodox Valiyapali
- Angadicka Mar Baselios Gregorios Orthodox Church
- Angadickal St.George Orthodox Church
- Arruvappulam St.George Orthodox Church
- Athirumkal St.George Orthodox Church
- Attachakal Mar Pelexinos Orthodox Valiyapalli
- Attachakal St.Peter's Orthodox
- Chandanapally St.George Orthodox Valiyapalli
- Chandanapally St.Thomas Orthodox
- Chengara St.George Orthodox Church
- Elicode St.George Orthodox Church
- Ellimullumplakal St.George Orthodox Church
- Kadamanitta St.Johns Orthodox
- Kaipattoor, St Ignatius Orthodox Maha Edavaka
- Kalleli Mar Kuriakose Orthodox Church
- Kalleli St.George Orthodox Church
- Kalleli Thottam St.Thomas Orthodox Church
- Karoor St.Peters Orthodox Church
- Kizakkupuram St.George Orthodox Church
- Kizhavaloor St.Peters Orthodox Valiyapali
- Kodumon St.Behanans Orthodox Valiyapali
- Kokkathodu St.George Orthodox Church
- Konnapara St.Peters Orthodox Church
- Konni Mangaram St.Marys Orthodox Church
- Konni St.George Orthodox Maha Edavaka
- Kozencherry St.Mathews Orthodox Valiyapali
- Kudappanakkulam St.Marys Orthodox Church
- Kumbazha St.Marys Orthodox Cathedral
- Kumbazha St.Simeon Destuni Orthodox Cathedral
- Kureeleeyam St.Johns Orthodox Church
- Lakkoor St.Marys Orthodox Church
- Makkamkunu St.Stephens Orthodox Cathedral
- Mallasherry St.Marys Orthodox Church
- Manarakulanji Mar Baselios Gregorios Orthodox Church
- Manneera Mar Philoxenos Orthodox Church
- Mulanthara St.Marys Orthodox Church
- Mullanikadu St.Marys Orthodox Valiyapali
- Mylapra St.George Orthodox Valiyapali
- Nannuvakadu St.Gregorios Orthodox Valiyapali
- Naranganum Mar Osios Orthodox Church
- Nariyapuram Immanuel Orthodox Valiyapali
- Nedumonkavu St.Thomas Orthodox Church
- Njakkukavu St.Marys Orthodox Church
- Ommallor St.Thomas Orthodox Valiyapali
- Onnukal St.George Orthodox Church
- Palamoodu Mar Kuriakose Orthodox Church
- Panackal Mar Bursouma Orthodox Church
- Parakulam Mar Gregorios Orthodox Church
- Pathanamthitta Mar Gregorios Orthodox Church
- Ponnambi St.George Orthodox Church
- Prakkanam St.Marys Orthodox Valiyapali
- Puthenpeedika North St.Marys Orthodox Church
- Puthenpeedika St.Marys Orthodox Valiyapali
- Thalachira Mar Yeldho Mar Baselios Orthodox Church
- Thannithode St Antony's Orthodox Valiyapali
- Thatta St.George Catholicate Simhasana Pali
- Thatta St.Marys Orthodox Church
- Thekkuthode St.George Orthodox Church
- Thekkuthode St.Thomas Orthodox Church
- Thonniyamala St.George Orthodox Church
- Thoompakulam St.Marys Orthodox Church
- Thottupuram St.Marys Orthodox Church
- Thumpamon St.Marys Orthodox Cathedral
- Thumpamon Bethany St.Marys
- Thumpamon Eram St.George Orthodox Valiyapali
- Thumpamon St.Marys Kadeeshtha Orthodox Church
- Thumpamon St.Thomas Orthodox Church, Vayalinumpadinjaru
- Ulanadu St.Johns Orthodox Valiyapali
- V.Kottayam St.Marys Orthodox Church
- V.Kottayam St.George Orthodox Church
- Vadakkupuram St Mary's Orthodox Church
- Vakayar St.Marys Orthodox Valiyapali
- Vakayar Kolenpady St.Gregorios Orthodox Church
- Vanchitra Mar Bes Hanania Orthodox Church
- Variyapuram St.Gregorios Orthodox Church
- Vattakavu St.Peters and St.Pauls Orthodox Church
- Vazhamuttom East Mar Bursouma Orthodox Church
- Vazhamuttom Mar Behanan Orthodox Valiyapali
- Vettipuram St.Mary's Orthodox
- Vettipuram West St.George Orthodox
- Vettoor St.Marys Orthodox Church
