= Dionysius Vattasseril =

Indian saint (1858–1934)

Saint Geevarghese Dionysius of Vattasseril (Mar Dionysius VI) Malankara Metropolitan
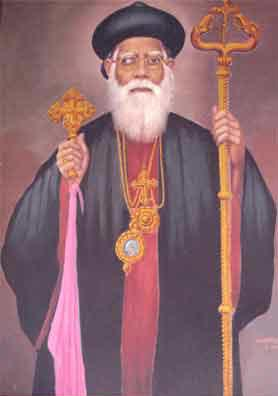
- Portrait of St. Geevarghese Dionysius of Vattasseril

The Great Luminary of Malankara Church
- Born: Geevarghese; 31 October 1858; Mallapally
- Hometown: Kottayam
- Died: 23 February 1934 (aged 75); Kottayam
- Venerated in: Malankara Orthodox Syrian Church,
- Canonized: 24 February 2003 by Baselios Mar Thoma Mathews II, Catholicos of the East and Malankara Metropolitan
- Major shrine: Old Seminary, Kottayam
- Feast: 24 February
- Influences: St. Gregorios of Parumala
- Influenced: Baselios Geevarghese II
- Major works: Doctrines of the Church

Dionysious VI of Vattasseril Malankara Metropolitan
- Church: Malankara Church
- See: Apostolic Throne of St Thomas
- Elected: 1908
- Installed: 1909
- Term ended: 1934
- Predecessor: Dionysious V
- Successor: MOSC: Baselios Geevarghese II Catholicos & MSOC: Mar Coorilos Paulose

Orders
- Ordination: 18 January 1880 by Geevarghese Gregorios of Parumala
- Consecration: 31 May 1908 by Patriarch Ignatius Abded Aloho II
- Rank: Malankara Metropolitan

Personal details
- Born: Geevarghese; October 31, 1858 Mallappally, Kerala
- Died: February 23, 1934 (aged 75) Kottayam
- Buried: Orthodox Theological Seminary, Kottayam

Geevarghese Dionysius Vattasseril, also Dionysius VI, Dionysius Geevarghese II or, popularly, Vattasseril Thirumeni (31 October 1858 – 23 February 1934), was a bishop of the Malankara Church and 15th Malankara Metropolitan. In 2003, Dionysius was canonized as a saint by the Malankara Orthodox Church, and his feast day is celebrated on February 23 each year. He is known as 'The Great Luminary of Malankara Church' (Malayalam: Malankara Sabha Bhasuran), a title which the Church bestowed on him in recognition of his contribution to the Church.

== Early life and education ==
Geevarghese was born in Vattasseril family, the fifth child of Joseph Vattasseril of Mallappally and Aleyamma, Kolathu Kalathil of Kurichy, on 31 October 1858. Among his siblings, Ouseph Punnoose was also a priest. Following his elementary education at C. M. S. Middle School in Mallappally he completed his high school education from C. M. S. High School, Kottayam. On 12 October 1876, while still a high school student, he was ordained as a sub-deacon by Patriarch of Antioch Ignatius Peter III at Puthuppally St. George Church.

== Life in the Church ==
He studied at the Orthodox Theological Seminary (Old Seminary or Pazhaya Seminary), Kottayam for four years. He acted as the secretary to Gregorios Geevarghese of Parumala. Geevarghese soon became a great Syriac scholar under the careful tutelage of St. Gregorios, who taught him at Parumala Seminary. He also learned Theology and Syriac language from Metropolitan Baselios Paulose I at Monastery of Saint Thomas, Vettikkal. On 16 October 1879, the sub-deacon Geevarghese was ordained as a full deacon and on 18 January 1880 he was ordained to priesthood by St. Gregorios himself. For some time, Fr. Geevarghese oversaw the theological education at Parumala Seminary. As per the existing tradition, he had been ordained for Parumala Seminary. During the period 1881–1908 he was the manager of the Seminary. In 1895, Fr. Geevarghese accompanied St. Gregorios on his visit to the Holy Land along with Paulose Ramban.

=== Malankara Malpan ===
By 1880, Rev. Fr. Geevarghese had become an authority in the Syriac language, Canons of the Church, Church History, Faith and Doctrine, the Church Fathers, Patristics and Theology. In recognition of his expertise in Syriac and theology he was designated as Malankara Malpaan (a Doctor and Teacher of the Church). In 1887, he was appointed the Syriac teacher at the Old Seminary. Malpan Fr. Geevarghese spent his spare time reading, studying, and thinking which translated to his many writings. He also used his scholarship to edit and publish the order of Church worship to be used by the laity as an aid for participation in worship. He wrote and published a book titled Syriac - Chapter I for students of the language. During this period, he also authored the book Doctrines of the Church (Mathopadeshasarangal) which remains one of the most authoritative and popular works describing Orthodox dogma and ecclesiastical traditions with thorough Scriptural explanations. In 1903, he translated the Holy Service book from Syriac to the local language Malayalam and published it with the blessings of the Church authorities.

=== Principal of M. D. Seminary School ===
In 1896, by the decision of Managing Committee of the Church, he was appointed as Principal of M. D. Seminary School, Kottayam. He served as the Principal for eight years, while teaching at the Old Seminary at the same time. His colleagues at the Seminary include the eminent Syriac scholar Rev. Fr. Mathen Malpan of Konat.

=== Bishopric ===
The Malankara Association meeting which convened at Parumala Seminary on 2 December 1902 nominated Fr. Geevarghese and Kochuparampil Paulose Ramban (later Malankara Metropolitan of the "Bava Kakshi" or the Patriarch faction in the Malankara Syrian Church) to the office of Metropolitan Bishop. On 2 November 1903 (the first Feast day of St. Gregorios), Fr. Geevarghese Malpan was blessed as a Ramban (monk) at Parumala Seminary by Dionysius V (Pulikkottil Joseph Dionysius II). Following this, he moved to the Old Seminary. The Malankara Association meeting of 14 February 1908 officially elected him along with Kochuparampil Paulose Ramban for consecration as Metropolitan. In the same year, the Patriarch of Antioch Ignatius Abded Aloho II asked the two elected monks to reach Jerusalem during the Great Lent for the ordination. The two-week-long journey began on 13 April 1908. The party which also included Kallasseril Punnoose Ramban (later Catholicos Geevarghese II), Karottuveetil Fr. Yuyakkim (later Metropolitan Yuyakkim Ivanios) and Dn. Mathews Paret (later Mathews Ivanios) arrived at Jerusalem on 23 April (Holy Saturday). After some delay, the Patriarch Ignatius Abded Aloho II arrived from Turkey. On 31 May 1908, the ordination took place at Sehion House (where Jesus had the Last Supper). Fr. Geevarghese was enthroned as Geevarghese Dionysius Metropolitan by the patriarch. The ceremony was attended by representatives of Coptic and Greek Orthodox Churches. Dionysius was appointed as the Bishop of the Malankara Church in general and as the assistant to the Malankara Metropolitan Dionysius V The newly ordained bishop served as the Assistant Malankara Metropolitan for almost a year; he became Malankara Metropolitan in 1909.

=== Malankara Metropolitan ===
On 26 November 1911, the Malankara Association convened at the Old Seminary and elected Geevarghese Dionysius as the successor to Malankara Metropolitan Dionysius V. The next year he assumed full office of Malankara Metropolitan following the demise of Dionysius V and served and led the Church in that capacity until his death in 1934 when he and the Church triumphed in establishing the official constitution of the Malankara Orthodox Syrian Church.

=== Rift of the Malankara Syrian Church ===
By the early 1910s, there was a rift in the Malankara Church and the two factions emerged, with the Metropolitan faction (Later as Malankara Orthodox Church) remaining in support and under the Malankara Metropolitan Dionysius of Vattasseril, while the faction supporting the Patriarch (known as Patriarch faction) elected a new Malankara Metropolitan Coorilos Paulose of Panampady under the Patriarch of the Antioch.

Malankara Syrian Church Titles
Preceded by Pulikkottil Joseph Dionysious II	Malankara Metropolitan of the Malankara Syrian Church; 1909–1934	Succeeded by Baselios Geevarghese II

== Legacy ==
He was an outstanding orator who was well aware of the importance of the vitality and Christian persuasiveness of the Bible when delivering the speeches to the faithful. Prayers and fasting were the pillars of his spiritual foundation. In addition to the liturgical hours of prayer, he spent much time in private prayers and silent meditations behind closed doors. In spite of his busy schedule, he was also able to focus on three to four lessons from the Holy Bible every day. Despite the many spiritual qualities he shared leadership qualities like domineering charisma and progressive mindedness. The Malankara Orthodox Church recognizes him as a living saint of his time on earth.

Mar Dionysius VI and his fellow clergies have played a central role in elevating the primate of Malankara Orthodox Church to the title Catholicos of the East. By establishing the Catholicate in Malabar, the visionary Metropolitan succeeded in defending the sovereignty and independence of the St. Thomas Christians of India, though the rift between the Jacobite Syrian Orthodox Church and the Malankara Orthodox Church were never resolved and has grown worse over time with regular legal arguments and some physical altercations. Mar Dionysius VI also prepared a first draft of the Church Constitution with the aid of Patriarch Ignatius Abdul Masih II and of using his profound knowledge in the Canons of the Church. This draft was used to prepare the Church Constitution of 1934. In his last encyclical, he wrote to the entire Malankara Church:

And I commit in each of you the responsibility to upkeep that institution which most of you along with myself truly believe to be indispensable for the survival, prosperity and progress of our Church, and which has been till now painstakingly guarded by all of us, namely the Catholicate.

== Death ==
Dionysius VI experienced physical suffering on 13 February 1934, and suffered from paralysis on 16 February. On 21 February, Baselios Geevarghese II administered him the service of Anointing. Two days later, Dionysius VI died on 23 February 1934. He was buried the next day in the Chapel of Old Seminary, Kottayam, near the tombs of his predecessors. And he has the same death as His Grace Dr Thomas Mar Makarios Metropolitan

In his speech that day, Baselios Geevarghese II said:

On this first Saturday of the Great Lent, on this day of remembrance of the global Malpan Mar Aprem, the great Malpan of Malankara has entered eternal rest. On this day of remembrance of the Martyr St Thevodoros who laid his life for our Lord, our Metropolitan, who is eligible to be called Confessor for suffering similar persecution for the Church, is being interred.

== Canonization ==
Dionysius VI was exalted as a saint and confessor to the faithful. On the 69th feast day of Dionysius VI (24 February 2003), he was canonized by the Episcopal Synod of Malankara Orthodox Church headed by Baselios MarThoma Mathews II, Malankara Metropolitan and Catholicos of the Malankara Church. The Catholicos Baselios Geevarghese II might have foreseen this when he instructed the sentence "The time will not dim his glory" to be engraved on the tomb of Dionysius VI. 23 February is observed as the saint's feast day.

St. Dionysius is the second Indian Saint to be canonized by the Malankara Orthodox Syrian Church, after Gregorios of Parumala.

== Churches, monasteries and orphanages ==
Honoring the Saint's memory, several churches and educational institutions have been established including St. Dionysius Church, Perukavu (Trivandrum), St. Dionysius Church in Al Ain, United Arab Emirates, St. dionysius orthodox church Desertland, Dammam (under diocese of Thrissur), St. Dionysius Indian Orthodox Church, Auckland, New Zealand, St. Dionysius Orthodox Church, Dasarahalli, Bangalore, St. Dionysius Orthodox Chapel, Aravali (Gurugram) and Dionysius Senior Secondary School in Mallappally, Kerala, to name a few. M. G. D. Ashram (monastery) at Panayampala, Kerala was founded in 1980 with St. Dionysius as its Patron Saint. The Ashram has an orphanage (Balabhavan) in its care since 2000.

== See also ==
- Malankara Orthodox Syrian Church
- Mar Thoma I
- Mar Thoma II
- Mar Thoma III
- Mar Thoma IV
- Mar Thoma V
- Mar Thoma VI (Dionysius I)
- Mar Thoma VII
- Mar Thoma VIII
- Mar Thoma IX
- Dionysius II
- Dionysius III
- Dionysius IV
- Athanasius
- Dionysius V
- Baselios Geevarghese II
