= Bible translations into Malayalam =

Translation of the Bible into Malayalam began in 1806. Church historians say Kayamkulam Philipose Ramban, a scholar from Kayamkulam, translated the Bible from Syriac into Malayalam in 1811 to help the faithful gain a better understanding of the scripture. The Manjummal translation is the first Catholic version of the Bible in Malayalam. This is the direct translation from Latin. The four Gospels and the Acts of the Apostles were translated by the inmates of the Manjummal Ashram, Fr. Aloysius, Fr. Michael and Fr. Polycarp. The Pancha Granthy came out from Mannanam under the leadership of Nidhirikkal Mani Kathanar in 1924. The Catholic New Testament was published in full in 1940, and has influenced development of the modern language.

== History ==
The first attempt to translate the Bible into Malayalam was made by Pulikkottil Joseph Ittoop and Kayamkulam Philipose Ramban, with the support of the Rev. Claudius Buchanan and Colin Macaulay. Buchanan was Vice-Principal of the College of Calcutta and had a strong interest in linguistics. He visited South India in the early 19th century and persuaded church leaders to translate biblical manuscripts into Malayalam, with support from local scholars. Claudius Buchannan, persuaded the Ramban to translate the holy book. The Malankara Church authorities in Travancore gave Buchannan, during his visit, a copy of the Bible in Syriac, known in local parlance as Suriyani. Macaulay was the British Resident of Travancore at that time. He actively supported Buchanan, attending meetings with senior church leaders as well as facilitating several audiences with the Maharajah of Travancore to secure his approval as well. Macaulay also undertook the task of supervising the translators.

At that time, Syriac was the liturgical language of Christians in Kerala. By 1807, Ittoop and Ramban—both Malankara Syrian Christian monks—had translated the four gospels from Syriac into Malayalam, assisted by Timapah Pillay. The venue to the translation of Bible into unified and standardized Malayalam vernacular was at Cottayam College" or the "Syrian Seminary" now called as "Old Seminary" or "Orthodox Theological Seminary", Chungom, Kottayam. The College was also privileged to offer the venue of the composition of Malayalam-English, English-Malayalam dictionaries. They then translated the Tamil version by Johann Philipp Fabricius into Malayalam. The Bible Society of India (then an Auxiliary of the British and Foreign Bible Society) paid for 500 copies to be printed in Bombay in 1811. Timapah completed translation of the New Testament in 1813, but this edition was found to include vocabulary known only to the Syriac Christian community and not to the general Malayalee population. This translation is now known as the Ramban Bible.

In 1817, the Church Missionary Society of India (CMS) provided Benjamin Bailey to translate the Bible into Malayalam. He completed his translation of the New Testament in 1829 and the Old Testament in 1841. Hermann Gundert updated Bailey's version and produced the first Malayalam-English dictionary in 1872. Phillipose Rampan (c. 1780–1850) also translated parts of the Bible into Malayalam.

== Modern versions ==
=== Protestant and Marthoma ===
==== Sathyavedhapusthakam ====
The Bible Society of India Kerala Auxiliary (established in 1956) made minor revisions to the Malayalam Old Version in 1910 called Sathyavedhapushthakam (സത്യവേദപുസ്തകം), which became the standard version for Marthoma Church and Protestant denominations. This version translates the Tetragrammaton as Jehovah (യഹോവ) throughout the Old Testament. The complete Sathyavedhapusthakam in Unicode was published online in 2004 by Nishad Hussein Kaippally. Sathyavedhapusthakam was published online in 2014 in various digital formats.

As per Bible Society of India (Kerala Auxiliary), there are 2 versions of Sathayavedhapusthakam popularly used today. Old/Original version (OV) and Common/Contemporary language version (CL). OV is the Malayalam Sathya Veda Pusthakam that was published in 1910. It is the most widely used version among non-catholic denominations. There was a need to bring out a Bible in the contemporary Malayalam language, thus the CL version which was published in 2013.

Based on the public domain version of the Malayalam Bible 1910 edition, digitized, revised and published by volunteers of The Free Bible Foundation in the contemporary orthography and released the source file for free use. Malayalambible.net use this version. This version was also used for creating a Malayalam Audio Bible by singer Binoy Chacko. Currently the Binoy Chacko audio bible app both in Android and Apple versions are available for NT and Psalms.

==== New India Bible Version ====
Biblica translated and published the New India Bible Version (NIBV) in Malayalam in 1997.

==== Easy To Read Version ====
The World Bible Translation Centre India provides the Easy-to-Read Version.

=== Catholic ===
==== POC Bible ====
In 1967, the Pastoral Orientation Center of the Kerala Catholic Bishops' Council began a new translation of the Bible; it was completed by 1981, and is known as the POC Bible. This version translates the Tetragrammaton as Lord (കർത്താവ്) in the main text and Yahweh (യാഹ്‌വെ) in various footnotes. It is available online in various digital formats.

=== Syriac Orthodox ===
The Syriac Orthodox Church uses the Peshitta version as its official Bible and hence all the translations that were done within the church where that of the Peshitta.

==== Syriac Orthodox Bible Society and Vishudha Grandham ====
The Syriac Orthodox Bible Society of India published the "Vishuddha Grandham" (വിശുദ്ധ ഗ്രന്ഥം), a translation of the Syriac Peshitta Bible into Malayalam. It was translated by famous Syriac scholar Curien Kaniyamparambil Arch Cor-Episcopa. It is available online in various digital formats. Vishudha Grandham is also available in IOS and Android platform. Vishudha Grandham Audio bible is available in Vishudha Grandham Youtube Channel.

=== Other works ===
==== Vishudha Sathyavedapusthakom ====
The Vishudha Sathyavedapusthakom by Bro.Dr.Mathews Vergis in Malayalam was released in 2000. It includes various appendices providing commentary about biblical characters and events. It renders the Greek term kyrios (Lord) as Jehovah (യഹോവ) in the New Testament when quoting Old Testament verses containing the Tetragrammaton. The translator assumes that Tetragrammaton originally appeared in New Testament but was later replaced by Christian copyists with Lord (Kyrios in Greek) following the Jewish tradition evident in later copies of Septuagint.

==== Free Bibles India ====
In collaboration with Church centric bible translation, Free Bibles India has published a Malayalam translation online.

==== New World Translation ====
In 2009, Jehovah's Witnesses released the New Testament in Malayalam, and in 2016 the complete New World Translation of the Holy Scriptures was released. It is available online in various digital formats. This translation replaced the name of God(Tetragrammaton) wherever it was in old scriptures.

== Usage of different versions in churches ==
Most churches in Kerala use Bibles in Malayalam. Saint Thomas Christians, Anglican, Evangelical and Pentecostal Churches use the Bible Society of India version.

=== Saint Thomas Christians ===
Saint Thomas Christians may have used the Peshitta Bible at church services until the sixteenth century conflict and church divisions; Saint Thomas Christian denominations now use various translations depending on their affiliation.

The Peshitta (Syriac Bible) translations by Andumalil Mani Kathanar and Fr. Mathew Uppani (Kottayam, 1997) are popular in the Syro-Malabar Catholic Church.

The Peshitta is also used by the Jacobite Syrian Christian Church and the Malankara Orthodox Syrian Church.

== See also ==
- Hermann Gundert
- Christianity
- Bible
