= Coorilos Paulose =

Indian saint

Saint Coorilos Paulose of Panampady
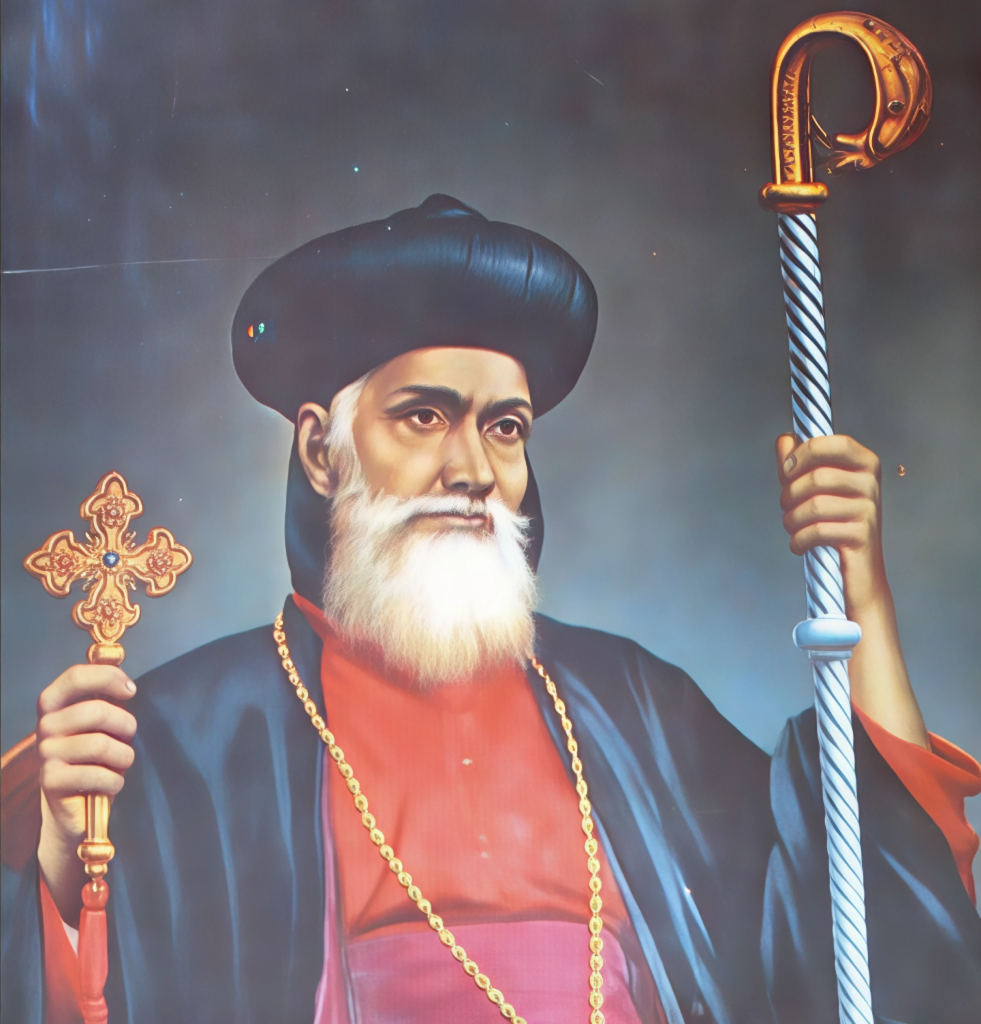
- Malankara Metropolitan H.G Mor Coorilos Paulose of Jacobite Syrian Orthodox Church

Malankara Metropolitan
- Born: Paulose; 4 December 1850; Kandanad
- Residence: Thozhupaadan Kochuparambil
- Died: 14 December 1917; Panampady St. Mary's Jacobite Syrian Church
- Venerated in: Syriac Orthodox Church
- Canonized: 24 October 2008, Panampady St.Mary's Jacobite Syrian Church by Ignatius Zakka I Iwas
- Major shrine: Panampady St.Mary's Jacobite Syrian Church
- Feast: 14 December
- Patronage: Malankara Jacobite Syrian Orthodox Church

Mar Coorilos
- Malankara Metropolitan
- Predecessor: Mor Dionysius VI
- Successor: Mor Athanasius Paulose

Orders
- Rank: Metropolitan

Mor Coorilos Paulose of Panampady (Coorilos of Malankara), also known as Kochuparambil Thirumeni or Panampady Thirumeni, was Malankara Metropolitan of the Malankara Jacobite Syrian Orthodox Church in India from 1911 until his death in 1917. He was canonized in 2008 by Ignatius Zakka I.

== Life ==
Coorilos was born December 4, 1850, in Kandanad, Kerala, India, to Varkey(Father) and Anna Paulose(Mother)

He was ordained as a deacon by Coorilos Yuyakim, the Reesh Episcopo of Malankara, at the age of nine, and studied under Pallathattu Geevarghese Qashisho, Stephanos and Koonappillil Geevarghese Qashisho.

He was ordained as a priest by Mathews Athanasius, Malankara Metropolitan, and celebrated his first Eucharist at the Kandanad Church. He was re-ordained by Dionysious V, Malankara Metropolitan, due to a church dispute, and he later served as a vicar at Mulanthuruthy Church. When Coorilos was still a priest, he began a monastic life at Vettikkal Shrine alongside Geevarghese Ramban, after Ignatius Peter IV—Patriarch of Antioch—ordained him as a monk (ramban) and declared Vettikkal Shrine as a monastery at the request of Geevarghese Gregorios of Parumala, which made it the first monastery of the Syriac Orthodox Church in Malankara. Coorilos served as manager of the Old Seminary, and took a prominent role in constructing the St. George Church of Trivandrum and St. Thomas Chapel of Manarcad, as well as founding several schools. He also visited the Holy Land with Geevarghese Gregorios during his time as a monk.

He was consecrated as a Metropolitan on 31 May 1908 by Ignatius Abded Aloho II—Patriarch of Antioch—together with Geevarghese Dionysius of Vattasseril, at the Monastery of Saint Mark, Jerusalem, according to the decisions of the regional synod of Malankara.

In 1909, Geevarghese Dionysius became Malankara Metropolitan of the Malankara Syrian Church. However, in 1911 the church split into "Metran Kakshi" (or, Metropolitan faction) and "Bava Kakshi" (or, Patriarch faction) following disputes. The Patriarch Abded Aloho II issued an order of excommunication for Geevarghese Dionysius, who continued as the Malankara Metropolitan of the Metropolitan faction, which later evolved into the Malankara Orthodox Syrian Church.

Coorilos was elected as Malankara Metropolitan of the Patriarch faction on 30 August 1911 by the Syrian Christian Association at a meeting held at Aluva under the leadership of Ignatius Abded Aloho II, Patriarch of Antioch.

Coorilos died on 14 December 1917.

== Sainthood ==
Ignatius Zakka I, Patriarch of Antioch, declared him a saint on 24 October 2008 for being a holy father who had preserved the faith in the crisis of the Syriac Orthodox Church in India, and gave permission to remember the name of Coorilos Paulose in the Fifth Diptych.

'Malankara Syriac Orthodox Church Titles
| Preceded by Geevarghese Dionysius; 1909-1911 | Malankara Metropolitan of Jacobite Syrian Christian Church; 1911–1917 | Succeeded by Athanasius Paulose |
