= Clemis =

Clemis is a given name and surname. Notable people with the name include:

- Clemis Abraham (1918–2002), Syriac Orthodox Church bishop
- Kuriakose Clemis (born 1936), Malankara Orthodox Syrian Church official
- Baselios Cleemis (born 1959), Archbishop of the Syro-Malankara Catholic Church
