= St. Thomas Cathedral, Kannamcode =

Kannamcode Cathedral
- St. Thomas Orthodox Cathedral, Kannamcode- Adoor
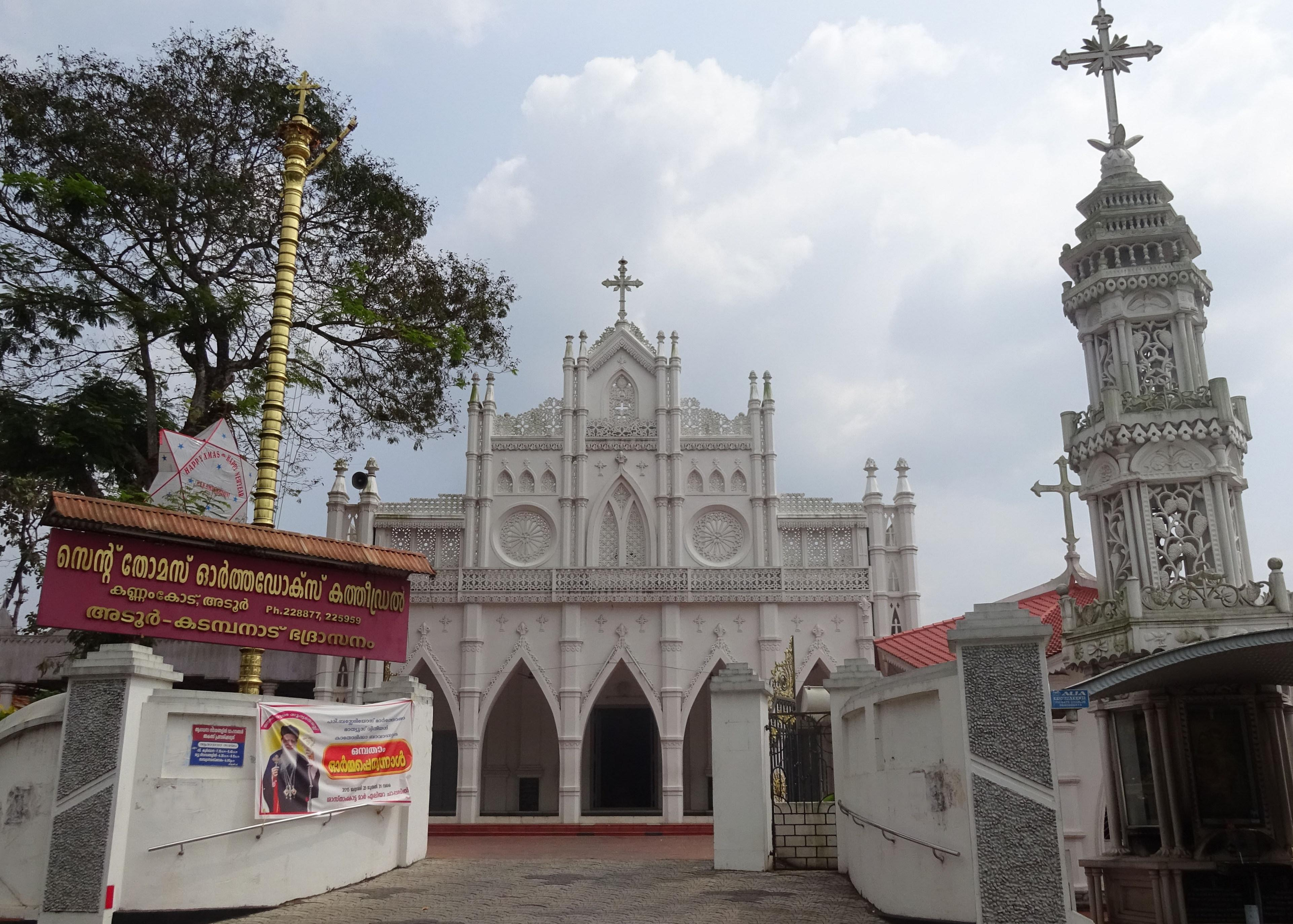
- St. Thomas Orthodox Cathedral, Kannamcode
- Kannamcode Cathedral
- 9.1542°N 76.7387°E
- Location: Adoor
- Country: India
- Denomination: Malankara Orthodox Syrian Church

History
- Status: Cathedral and Global Pilgrim Centre

Administration
- Diocese: Adoor-Kadampanad

Kannamcode Cathedral or Kannamcode St. Thomas Orthodox Cathedral is one of the oldest churches in Central Travancore. The church belongs to the Malankara Orthodox Syrian Church under the Adoor Kadampanad Orthodox Diocese. Kannamcode Cathedral is situated in Adoor, Pathanamthitta, Kerala, India. Adoor has a large population of Syrian Christians. Christianity in this locality has a tradition of more than a millennium and a half years, beginning from the village of Kadampanad. St. Thomas Orthodox Cathedral, Kannamcode, a very old Church in central Travancore, has a history of approximately 900 years, belonging to the Malankara Orthodox Syrian Church under 'Adoor-Kadampanad' diocese. Kannamcode. At Kadampanad the age of early Christian community dates back to 4th century A.D about two centuries later than the arrival of St. Thomas on the Kerala coast. Prior to the building of this church, the Christian community had to depend on nearby churches - Thumpamon Orthodox Church and third Kannamcode Cathedral to full fill their Christian services and spiritual needs. The people had to walk quite a bit of distance to attend church services and return to their village and it appeared to be tedious. Upon getting necessary permission and support from the local Hindu kings of Kayankulam, at last, a church came into being then called Veerappallil Yakoba Palli (suggesting that it was originally a church of the Jacobite Syrian Christian Church), later renamed as Kannamcode St. Thomas Orthodox Church. The same church is presently known as Kannamcode St. Thomas Orthodox Cathedral. It is also known as the capital church (തല പള്ളി ) of adoor. Vandya Kayamkulam Philipose Ramban, who first translated the Holy Bible into Malayalam rests in this parish. The holy relics of Saint. Parumala Thirumeni are enshrined in this parish.

== History ==
The earliest Christian settlement near Adoor was at the beginning of 4th century AD, during the establishment of Kadampanad Church.

=== Establishment of St. Thomas Orthodox Cathedral, Kannamcode ===
Though the exact date of construction of this church is unclear, it has a history of approximately 900 years and was established in the order of Kadampanad Church and Thumpamon Church i.e. the place of Kadampanad Orthodox Church comes first, then the Thumpamon Orthodox Church and third Kannamcode Cathedral. The church was earlier known as Kannamcode St. Thomas Orthodox Church and presently known as Kannamcode St. Thomas Orthodox Cathedral.

=== Kayamkulam Philipose Ramban ===
The cathedral is the resting in place of the revered Philipose Ramban who translated The Holy Bible for the first time to the vernacular language Malayalam. The translation was based on the Syriac version of the Bible. Philipose Ramban died in 1811, and his mortal remains were interred at the cathedral. The church celebrates Sradha perunnal of Revered Rembachan every year on Malayalam month "thulam 26th". 100 copies of the Malayalam bible were given by Dr. Claudius Bukanan to Malankara church.

=== Parumala Thirumeni ===
H.H.Gheevarghese Mar Gregorios of Parumala (Parumala Thirumeni) visited this Church and led the Holy Qurbana several times. The bed he used during these visits is kept as a relic.

== Present ==
Kannomcode Cathedral is a prominent worship place in Adoor and is under the diocese of "Adoor-Kadampanad" of the Malankara Orthodox Syrian Church. The cathedral has two chapels, one in Kottamukal, and another at Pannivizha. It also has three Youth Movements and four Sunday Schools.

== See also ==
- Malankara Orthodox Syrian Church
- Nasrani
- Saint Thomas Christian Churches
- Kadampanad Church
- Thumpamon Church
