= Kuriakose Clemis =

Malankara Orthodox Syrian Church bishop

His Grace Kuriakose Clemis Metropolitan of Thumpamon Orthodox Diocese
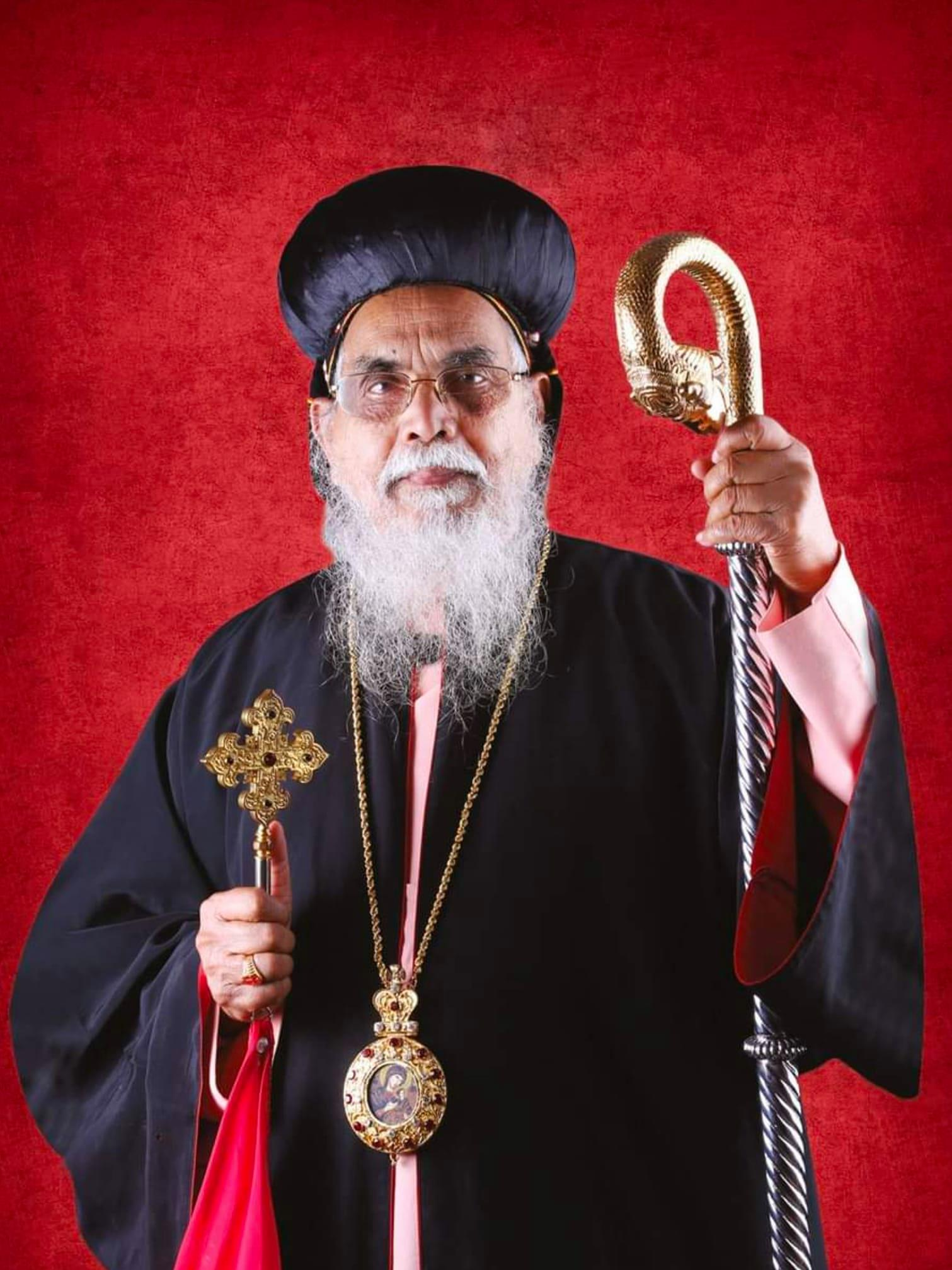
- Kuriakose Mar Clemis
- Church: Malankara Orthodox Syrian Church
- Diocese: Thumpamon Diocese
- See: Catholicos of the East
- Retired: 16-Aug-2023
- Predecessor: Philipose Eusebius
- Successor: Abraham Seraphim
- Previous posts: Metropolitan of Sulthan Bathery Diocese (1991–2009); Metropolitan of Thumpamon Diocese (2009–2023)

Orders
- Ordination: 1964 (Kassisso)
- Consecration: 30-Apr-1991 by Catholicos Baselios Marthoma Mathews II
- Rank: Valiya Metropolitan

Personal details
- Born: Kuriakose; 26 July 1936 (age 89) Nellikkal, Thiruvalla, Kerala
- Residence: Basil Aramana, Pathanamthitta, Kerala, India – 689 645
- Parents: Mr. P.K Mathai, Perumethmannil and Mrs. Sosamma
- Occupation: Botany teacher at Catholicate College Pathanamthitta
- Education: M.Sc in Science from Catholicate College Pathanamthitta, B.Ed from Mount Tabore Training College Pathanapuram,
- Alma mater: Kerala University

Kuriakose Mar Clemis (born 1936) is Metropolitan of Thumpamon Diocese of the Malankara Orthodox Syrian Church (transferred from Sultan Bathery). He was born 26 July 1936.

== Ordinations ==
He was ordained as a deacon in 1957, as a priest in 1964 and as a bishop in 1991.
