= St. Mary's Orthodox Syrian Cathedral, Thumpamon =

St. Mary's Orthodox Syrian Cathedral
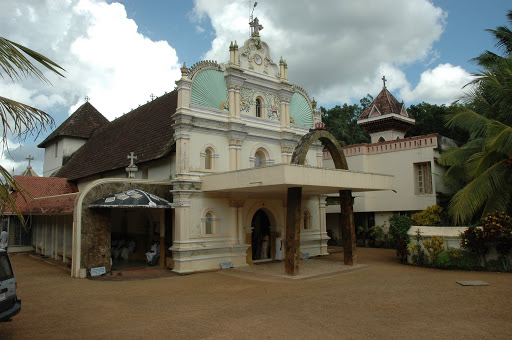
- St. Mary's Orthodox Cathedral, Thumpamon (തുമ്പമണ്‍ വലിയ പള്ളി)

- 9°13′0″N 76°43′0″E
- Location: Thumpamon, Kerala, India
- Denomination: Indian Orthodox Church; Parish
- Tradition: Malayalam Syrian
- Website: facebook

History
- Founded: AD 717

Administration
- Diocese: Thumpamon Diocese

St. Mary's Orthodox Syrian Cathedral (Thumpamon Valiya Pally or തുമ്പമണ്‍ വലിയ പള്ളി or Marthamariyam Badrasana Devalayam) is an Orthodox ancient church located in Thumpamon near Pandalam, Kerala state of India. It is the headquarters of the Thumpamon Diocese of the Malankara Orthodox Syrian Church.

== History ==
The first church in Thumpamon was built in AD 717, and the structure of that church was not like present one. The first church was a small prayer hall. As the years passed by, the Nazarene population in Thumpamon increased and in AD 900 the old church building was demolished and a much larger building was constructed in its place. Histories of Thumpamon states that in AD 900 (kollavarsham-350) Thumpamon Pally was built and it was the second structure of the church. It was renovated in the year 2017.

Between the two centuries, after the construction of the second church the population of Nazarene Christians in Thumpamon had increased considerably. So also, the influx of people from other places continued particularly from Nilakkal. Nilakkal was ravaged by attacks from dacoits led by Fakhuruddin Polygar. As the frequency and intensity by the robber gangs increased, agriculture and trade became disrupted and peaceful life made impossible at Nilakkal. Raja of Pandalam whose capital at that time was Konniyoor near Nilakkal. The Raja also found it impossible to continue his domain at Nilakkal. Hence in AD 1170 (ME 345) the Raja and retinue abandoned Nilakkal and chose Pandalam has headquarters for governing his territory. Consequently the Nazarene in Nilakkal also had to emigrate to other places such as Kanjirappally, Thumpamon and other places.

In AD 1175 to construct a bigger Church building, the Nazarene's of Thumpamon demolished the existing building. At this time, the authorizer of the Thumpamon Vadakkumnatha Temple which cannot desire antiquity prior toAD 950 opposed the reconstruction of the Church on the ground that the Velichappad of the temple had predicted that the construction of a Christian church there would pollute and de-santise the temple. The Raja was very much inclined to favour the Nazarene's as they were hardworking, peace-loving and model adhering to the lofty principles enshrined in Christianity. The Raja and his officers, therefore personally visited Thumpamon and surveyed the land which came with in his jurisdiction and permitted the construction of the church, notwithstanding the opposition of the land records residing nearly Thatta. The foundation for constructing a church building was laid on 15 August 1175 (15th Chingam 350 ME), the feast day of Virgin Mary.

== Portuguese period and the synod of Udayamperoor ==
The Christian community in Kerala was one unified flock with one shepherd all through the year till AD 1528. There was no interference in Malankara church by foreign churches. The 105 churches in Malankara existing at this period was headed by the 'Arkidyakon' who was the supreme authority. The administration of the individual churches was carried on by the parish priests assisted by elected lay leaders. Religious dignitaries who visited Malankara acted according to the advice of Arch deacon. Malankara Nazarene Christians were immensely proud of their St. Thomas tradition.

However, the winds of change began with the advent of the Portuguese to Malabar Coast in AD 1498. The Portuguese missionaries found that the local Christians did not recognize the authority of the Church in Rome. The quarrels and internal strife in the Malankara Church began with the attempts made by the Portuguese Missionaries to impose the authority of Rome over the Church. Early attempts made by wily and cunning foreign missionaries to bring the Malankara Nazarenes within the Roman fold were not successful. The situation changed with the coming of Aleixo de Menezes (Archbishop of Goa) to Malankara. The Arch Bishop was deputed with specific instructions to switch the allegiance of the Nazarene's to the Roman Church. He was a shrewd and intelligent person well versed in all types of political intrigues and had no qualms for using military power to achieve his aims. A synod was convened at Udayamperoor (Synod of Diamper) in AD 1599. The venue was well guarded by Portuguese soldiers and the delegates were prevented from communicating with one another.

The Portuguese gave a false picture about the practices in the Malankara Church and the delegates were urged to support their move for drastic reforms to bring the Malankara Church in line with the customs and practices of the Church in Rome. At that time Arch Deacon Geevarghese of the cross was the Head of the Malankara Church. Despite the decisions taken at the synod of Udayamperoor (Synod of Diamper), the majority of the Churches in Malankara chose to follow their Arch Deacon. Thereafter, the Arch Bishop visited 27 churches in Malankara to persuade them to toe the Roman line. He visited the St. Mary's Church at Thumpamon too, to bring it under his control. However, this attempt failed and Nazarene Christians in Thumpamon followed their original order of worship.

== Gallery ==
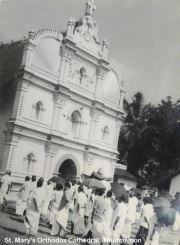
Old photo of Thumpamon Pall

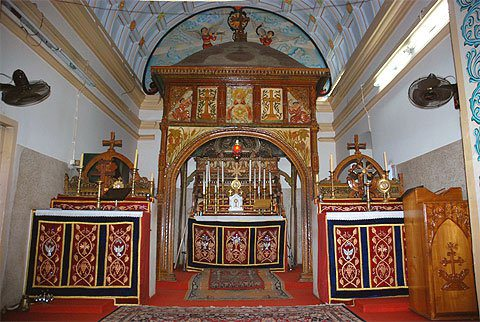
Altar of the Church

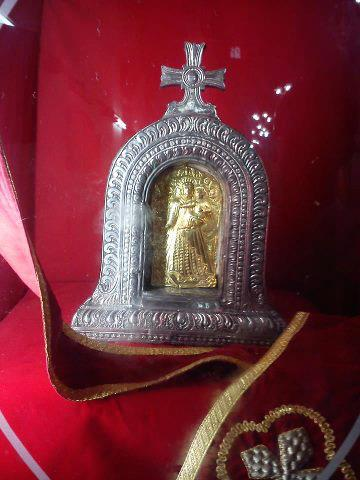
Yukno of Mother Mary

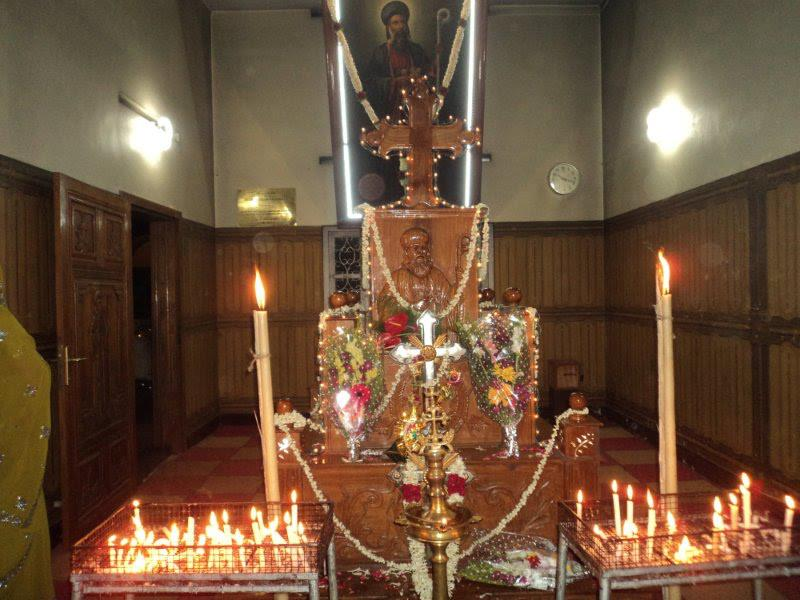
Relics of St. Gheevarghese Mar Gregorios of Parumala

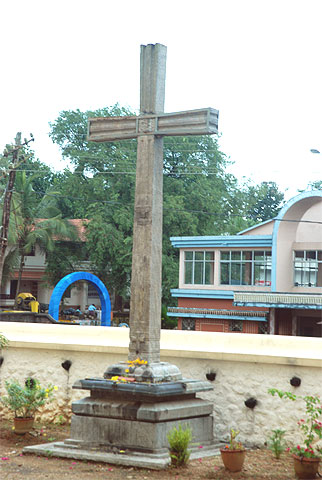
Old stone cross

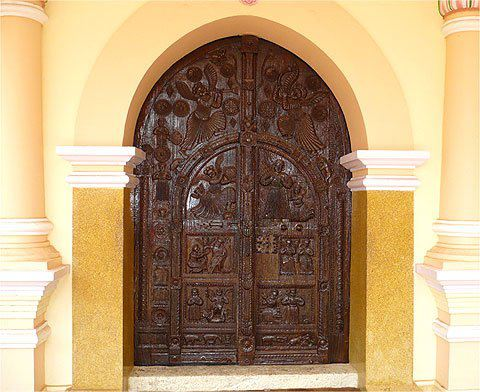
Wooden works in Main Door of Thumpamon Valiya Pally

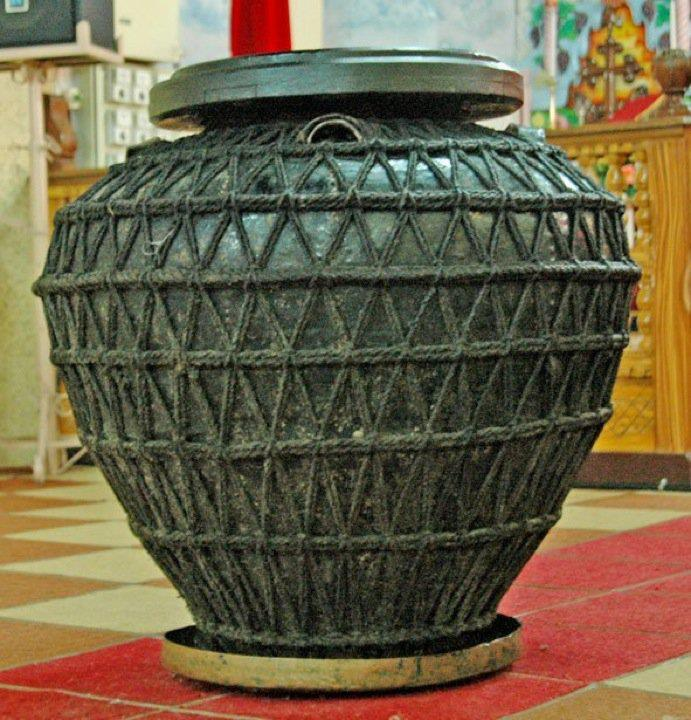
Ancient jar in the church

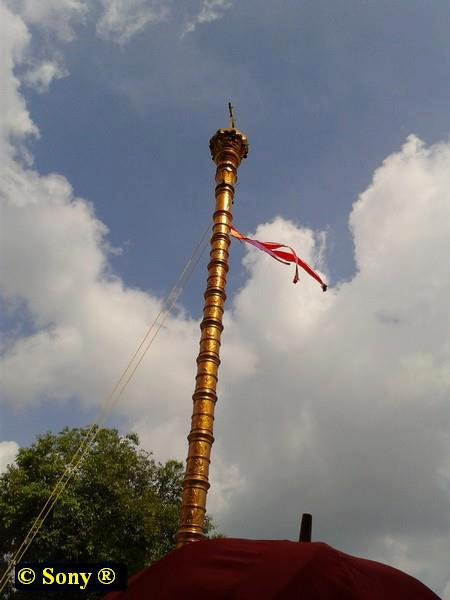
Flag post of Thumpamon Valiya Pally

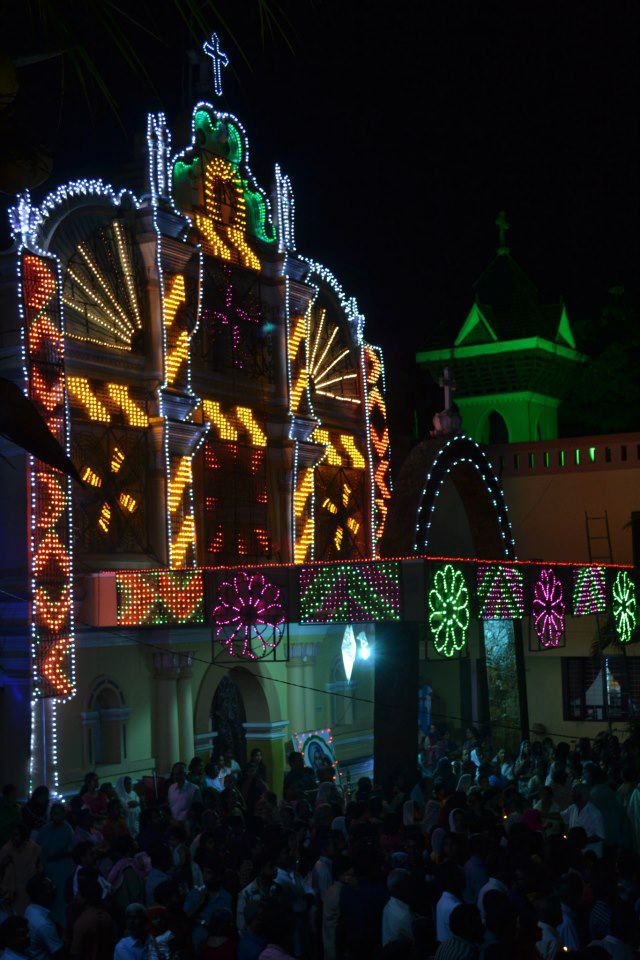
Illuminated Pally

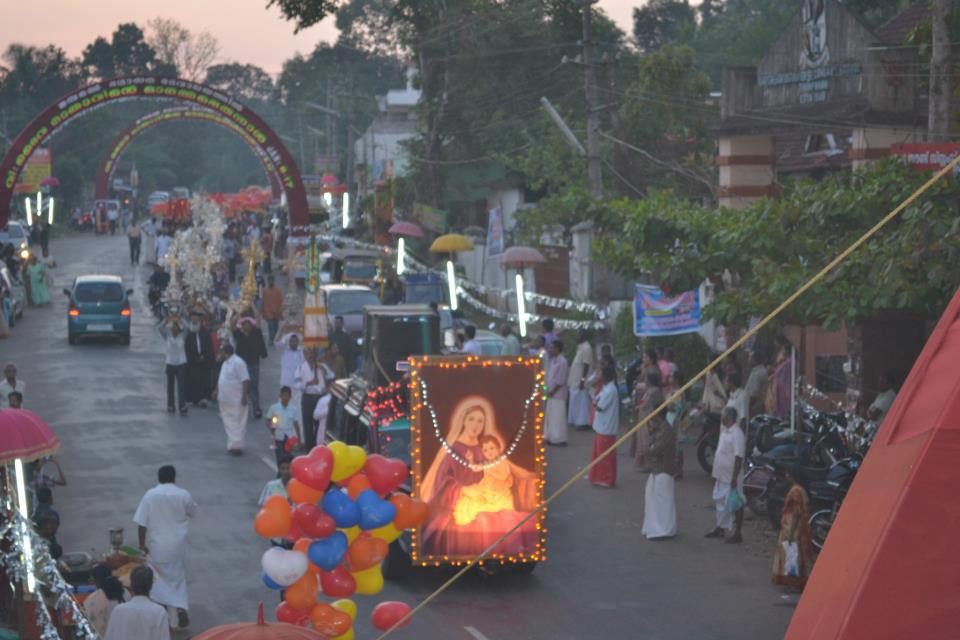
Thumpamon Pally Perunnal Raaza

== See also ==
- Malankara Orthodox Syrian Church
- Nasrani
- Saint Thomas Christian Churches
- Baselios Mar Thoma Paulose II
- Kadampanad Church
- Kannamcode Cathedral
