= Thoma IV =

Mar Thoma IV Malankara Metropolitan
- Malankara Church
- Installed: 1688
- Term ended: 24 March 1728
- Predecessor: Mar Thoma III
- Successor: Mar Thoma V

Personal details
- Died: 24 March 1728 Kandanad
- Buried: Marth Mariam Orthodox Syrian Cathedral, Kandanad

Mar Thoma IV was the 4th Malankara Metropolitan of the Malankara Church in India, serving from 1688–1728. During his tenure, the church was subject to a number of persecutions.

== Introduction ==
On the southwestern coast of India lies a small state known as Kerala It was here in the first century, Thomas the Apostle arrived to preach the gospel to the Jewish community. Some of the Jews and locals became followers of Jesus of Nazareth. They were known as Malabar Nasrani people and their church as Malankara Church. They followed a unique Hebrew-Syriac Christian tradition which included several Jewish elements and Indian customs.

In Malankara (Kerala) St. Thomas did not appoint any bishops, but an elder (Mooppen in Malayalam) was selected to lead the people. The parish leader was called Edavaka Mooppen and the church as a whole had a Malankara Mooppen. This was the tradition till 1653.

The Malayalam versions of the Canons of the Synod of Diamper use these titles throughout the report except in three places where they use the Latin word archidiaconus. There is no chance for the Malankara Church to use this Latin word. Portuguese were not familiar with the Malayalam wording Malankara Mooppen and so they might have used archidiaconus. The Malayalam name Jathikku Karthavian, given by some historians was not used in the Malayalam version of the canons. After the Coonan Cross Oath of 1653 rejecting primacy of the Bishop of Rome that they had been forced to accept in 1599, the Christians of Malankara consecrated their Mooppen/Archdeacon Thomas as a Bishop titled Thoma I. His successors Mar Thoma II and Mar Thoma III were ordained in 1670 and 1686 respectively.

== Consecration ==
There is nothing much known about his earlier days except that he was also from Pakalomattom family, just like his predecessors.

Mar Thoma III died suddenly on 21 April 1688 and was laid to rest at Kadampanad church. The leaders of the Malankara Church selected Mar Thoma IV as his successor. At that time Mar Ivanios Hidayuttulla from Antioch who arrived in Kerala in 1685 was the only bishop in Malankara. So Mar Ivanios consecrated Mar Thoma IV in 1688.

== Major events ==
The Dutch East India Company (Vereenigde Oost-Indische Compagnie or VOC in old-spelling Dutch, literally "United East Indian Company") was established in 1602. They attacked Cochin and the king of Cochin surrendered to the Dutch on 20 March 1663. They were in control of Cochin and the surrounding area during the time of Mar Thoma IV.

At this time Archbishop J.Robeiro demanded that the Malankara church should be under him. The Metropolitan complained to the Dutch company and Archbishop was banned from taking any action against the Malankara church. Metropolitan also complained about the atrocities committed by the Raja of Cochin. Because of the steps taken by the Company, that trouble also stopped. At Angamali a person named Antonio created trouble to the Malankara Church. He was given 24 hours notice to leave the country and the church that gave him refuge was closed down.

A Nestorian bishop Mar Gabriel arrived in Malabar in 1708. Neither the Malankara church nor the Catholics accepted him. Finally he came to Kottayam cheria palli. He died and was buried there. His burial place was later demolished and the stones were used as stepping stones to the parish building.

== Last days ==
By 1727, Mar Thoma IV fell sick. So the leaders of the Malankara Church selected a successor for him. He was consecrated as Mar Thoma V. On 24 March 1728 Mar Thoma IV died and was laid to rest at Kandanad Church (Kandanad Marth Mariam Orthodox Syrian Church).

Malankara Church Titles
Preceded by Mar Thoma III	Metropolitan of the Malankara Church; 1688–1728	Succeeded by Mar Thoma V

== See also ==
- Malankara Jacobite Syriac Orthodox Church
- Malankara Orthodox Syrian Church
- Mar Thoma Church
