= Kayamkulam Philipose Ramban =

Kayamkulam Philipose Ramban was a Syriac scholar and hieromonk of the Malankara Church, known for translating the Bible into Malayalam for the first time. His work, completed in 1811, made the Bible accessible to the Saint Thomas Christians.

== Early life ==
Philipose Ramban was born in Kayamkulam, Kerala, and resided at his family home, Mananganazhikathu, which later became known as Mananganazhikathu Rambachan's House. At the time, Syriac, or Suriyani as it was locally known, was the liturgical language used by Christians in Kerala.

== Translation of the Bible ==
In the early 19th century, Rev. Claudius Buchanan, a Scottish missionary, visited Kerala and encouraged local church leaders to translate the Bible into Malayalam. During this visit, the church authorities in Travancore provided Buchanan with a Syriac copy of the Bible. He then urged scholars, including Philipose Ramban, to translate the holy text into Malayalam, offering guidance to Syriac and Tamil scholars.

Philipose Ramban completed the translation of the Four Gospels. In 1811, the first version of the Bible in Malayalam, known as the Ramban Bible, was completed. This translation, titled Visudha Veda Pustakam, was composed in a hybrid language of Malayalam and Tamil.

The Ramban Bible was printed using lithographic technology, known locally as "Kallachu," at a press in Bombay (now Mumbai). It was the first Bible to be published in Malayalam.

== Death and legacy ==
Philipose Ramban died in 1811, and his remains were interred at the Kannamcode St. Thomas Orthodox Cathedral in Adoor, Kerala. This church, which belongs to the Malankara Orthodox Syrian Church, remains a significant center of worship in the region.

Following Philipose Ramban's initial translation, other versions of the Bible in Malayalam emerged. Benjamin Bailey, a missionary-scholar, produced a more complete version of the Bible in the 1840s, with assistance from Chandu Menon. In the 1850s, the German scholar Herman Gundert, who compiled the first Malayalam lexicon, translated the New Testament into Malayalam.

Every year, the church commemorates Philipose Ramban's contributions with a memorial feast ("Shraadha Perunnal") on the 26th day of the Malayalam month of Thulam.

== See also ==
- Kayamkulam
- Kannamcode St. Thomas Orthodox Cathedral
- Jacobite Syrian Orthodox Church
- Malankara Orthodox Syrian Church
