= Kadampanad Bhagavathy Temple =

- Bhagavathy Temple, Kadampanad, Pathanamthitta, Kerala

Religion
- Affiliation: Hinduism
- District: Pathanamthitta
- Deity: Bhadrakali
- Festival: Pongala

Location
- Location: Kadampanad
- State: Kerala
- Country: India
- Interactive map of Kadampanad Bhagavathy Temple
- Coordinates: 9°05′34.5″N 76°40′57.2″E

Architecture
- Type: Architecture of Kerala

Specifications
- Temple: One
- Elevation: 50.72 m (166 ft)

Kadampanad Bhagavathy Temple is a Hindu temple situated at Kadampanad in Pathanamthitta district, Kerala, India. It is 12 km from Adoor, 6.6 km from Mannady and 10 km from Sasthamkotta. The deities worshiped in the temple are Sree Bhadrakali Devi, Sree Dharmashasthavu and Sree Durga Devi. The annual festival comes in the month of April (Meenam). It is a 10-day festival which starts with a holy flag hoisting and ends with a flag lowering. On the 10th day of the festival there is an aaraattu, a holy bath for Devi and Shasthavu, which includes a huge procession with many elephants.

The temple is managed by karayogam no. 232 (a local unit) of the Nair Service Society (NSS).

== Location ==
This temple is located at an altitude of about 50.72 m above the mean sea level with the geographic coordinates of 9°05′34.5″N 76°40′57.2″E in Kadampanad.
