= St. Dionysius Orthodox Church =

Coordinates: 24°8′30.5″N 55°50′42.2″E

St. Dionysius Orthodox Church is an Indian Orthodox church in the city of Al Ain, Emirate of Abu Dhabi. It is the first church dedicated to the sacred memory of Saint Geevarghese Dionysius of Vattasseril, the third proclaimed saint of the Malankara Orthodox Syrian Church. It is the largest Indian Orthodox church in the Arab region.

== St. Dionysius of Vattaserril ==
Saint Geevarghese Mar Dionysius of Vattasseril (31 October 1858 – 23 February 1934) was the Malankara Metropolitan (primate) of the Indian Orthodox Church. Vattasseril Geevarghese Mar Dionysius is popularly known as "Malankara Sabha Bhasuran" (Malayalam: Malankara Sabha Bhasuran, meaning 'The Great Luminary of Malankara Church'). He received that title in recognition of his contribution to Malankara Church.

Vattasseril Thirumeni was a man of prayer, determination and dynamism. He was an advocate of the sovereignty and autonomy of the Malankara Orthodox Syrian Church. He was an outstanding orator who emphasized the importance of the Bible when preaching to the faithful. Prayers and fasting were central to his faith. He spent much time in private prayer and silent meditation. He focused on three to four Bible lessons each day.

By his leadership qualities including powerful charisma and progressive mindedness, the church recognized him as a living saint.

His legacy survived through his successors and students, including Catholicos of the East, H. H. Baselios Geevarghese II and Metropolitan Kuriakose Mar Gregorios of Pampady. He was apparently inspired by the reformation movements during his time. He maintained an ardent faith, citing Mary of Bethany (Luke 10:42).

Mar Dionysius VI was exalted as a saint and confessor. On the 69th feast day of Mar Dionysius VI (24 February 2003), he was canonized by the Episcopal Synod of Malankara Orthodox Church headed by H. H. Baselios Mar Thoma Mathews II, Catholicos of the East. St. Dionysius is the second Indian to be canonized by the Malankara Orthodox Syrian Church. Catholicos Baselios Geevarghese II might have foreseen this when he caused "The time will not dim his glory" to be engraved on the tomb of Mar Dionysius VI. 23 February is observed as the saint's feast day. Thousands of believers visit the church to seek his blessings.

A portion of the holy relics of the saint has been preserved in St. Dionysious Orthodox church by the late H. H.Baselios Paulose II as per the request of the faithful.

== History ==
A congregation of the Malankara Orthodox Syrian Church under the title St. George Orthodox Congregation was initiated in 1968. It was begun by expatriates who had come from Kerala seeking work. During this period the Orthodox Congregation of Abu Dhabi was elevated to the rank of a church and Fr. T. A Jacob was appointed as its resident vicar by the metropolitan of the Kerala region. The faithful in Al Ain contacted him and under his leadership the holy Qurbana was conducted once in three months in one of the houses of the faithful. In 2003, after long years of tribulation, the congregation was elevated to the rank of a church with the title St. Dionysius Orthodox Church.

In 2010 the rulers of UAE granted the church land for the church building. Worshippers had previously gathered at the parsonage for evening prayers and services and special events were held at other churches. The cornerstone was laid on April 20 by H.G Abraham Mar Seraphim in the presence of the diocesan metropolitan H.G Youhanon Mar Demetrios. Construction began under the blessings of Fr. Saji Abraham. The church fathers had visited the construction site and blessed it. The church is a landmark in the history of the Orthodox Church of India. The building can accommodate up to 1,500 believers. The Dh13 million project was funded by donations from members and local and international benefactors. Sister churches in other emirates were major contributors. Its consecration was conducted in 2014 by the late H.H moran mor Baselios Paulose II, Catholicos of the East and Malankara metropolitan. A colossal multitude of believers gathered for the consecration ceremony.

== Parish activities ==
The parish has about 230 members and nearly 500 people come together on Sundays and Saturdays to celebrate the Holy Qurbana. The Sunday school, Youth Movement, and Martha Mariam Samajam have 120, 50, and 40 members, respectively. MGOCSM has strength of 20 members. Three prayer groups are active with 120 members. Ministry of Human Empowerment activities are organized under the leadership of OCYM and Martha Mariam Samajam.

The Vicar and Managing committee coordinate many spiritual activities that benefit the sick, homeless, education-deprived, and those with marital troubles. Every year in February - March, the church holds the feast of St. Dionysius of Vattasseril which is attended by thousands of believers across the country. The church is led by Vicar Fr. Mathew Varghese .
