= St. Thomas Orthodox Cathedral, Kadampanad =

Coordinates: 9.0945817°N 76.6882643°E

Kadampanad Church
- St. Thomas Orthodox Cathedral, Kadampanad
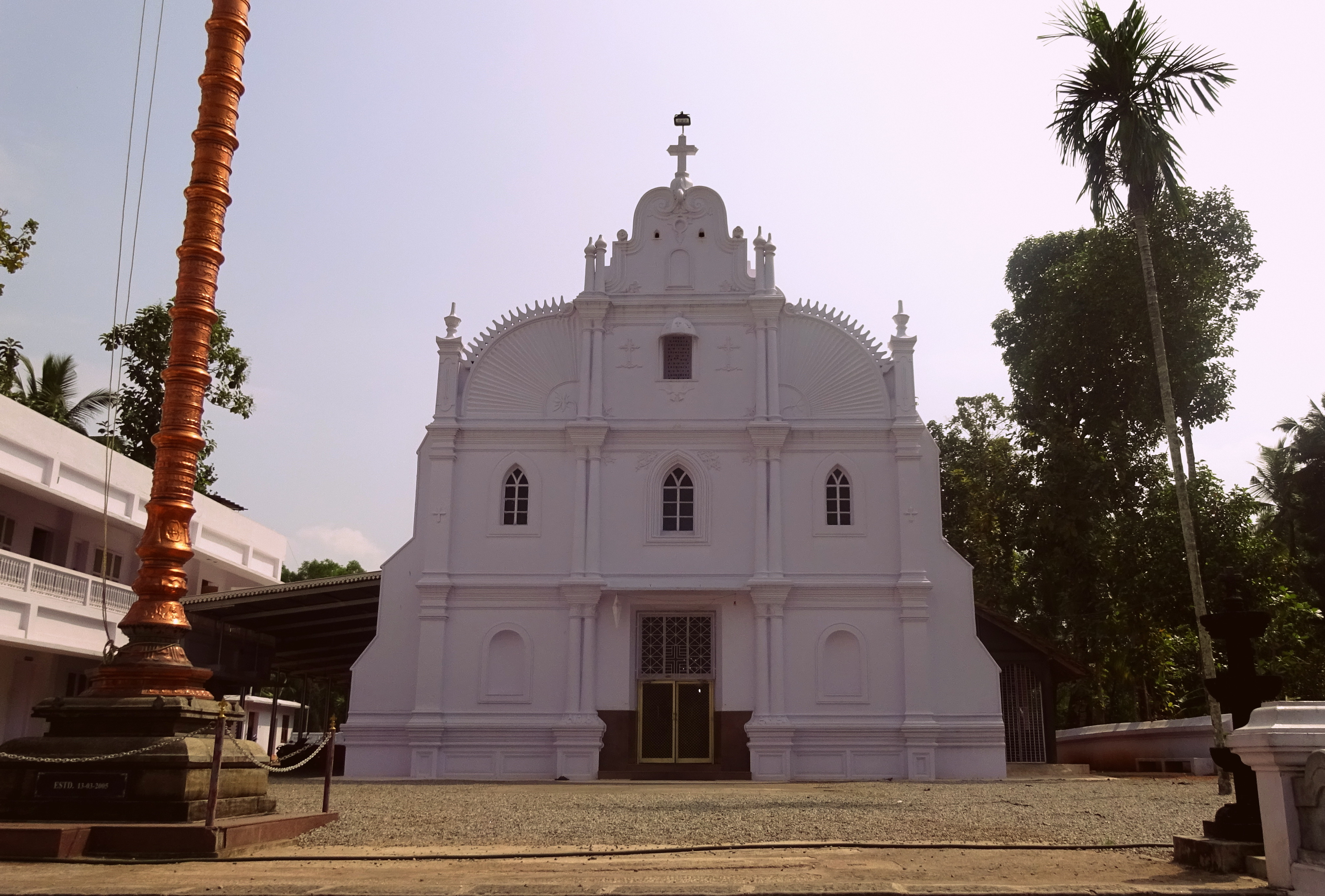
- St. Thomas Orthodox Cathedral, Kadampanad
- Kadampanad Church
- Location: Kadampanad, Adoor, Pathanamthitta District, Kerala
- Country: India
- Denomination: Malankara Orthodox Syrian Church
- Website: www.kadampanadstthomascathedral.com

History
- Status: Church
- Founded: AD 325
- Dedication: Saint Thomas (Mar Thoma Sliha)

Administration
- Diocese: Adoor-Kadampanad

St. Thomas Orthodox Cathedral, Kadampanad, popularly known as Kadampanad Church ( കടമ്പനാട് പള്ളി ) is an ancient church of Saint Thomas Christians situated in the Central Travancore village of Kadampanad, in Pathanamthitta District, Kerala, India. This Church belongs to the Malankara Orthodox Syrian Church under the Diocese of Adoor-Kadampanad.

== History ==
Kadampanad church is one of the oldest churches of St. Thomas Christians in Kerala. Mar Thoma Sliha (St. Thomas), an Apostle of Jesus Christ, came to India in AD 52 and established a Christian community in Kerala. There is evidence that he established eight churches (known as Ezharapallikal). One among them was at Chayal (Nilackel), situated in the western ghats. In the beginning of the fourth century, a group of Syrian Christians from Chayal migrated to Kadampanad. They consecrated a church at Kadampanad in accordance with Syrian tradition and rituals in AD 325, in the name of Mar Thoma Sliha as their patron saint. As time went by, a strong Syrian Christian community flourished in the vicinity of this church.

This church has been rebuilt several times. According to tradition the reconstructions took place roughly around AD 800, AD 1200, AD 1800, AD 1912 and finally in 1952. There has been a subsequent migration of Syrian Christians from Nilackel during the period of the 12th century and later at the early half of the 14th century due to demolition of Nilackel Church (supposedly due to floods). This church is considered to be the mother church of many parishes in Central Travancore. The descendants of those who settled down in Kadampanad, later migrated to places like Mavelikkara, Kayamkulam, Kollakadavu, Adoor, Kozhenchery, Kaippattoor, Sooranadu, Kallada, Koodal etc., settled there and constructed new churches.

Saint Geevarghese Mar Gregorios (Parumala Thirumeni) oversaw the progress of the Church in 1895.

== Marthoma III ==
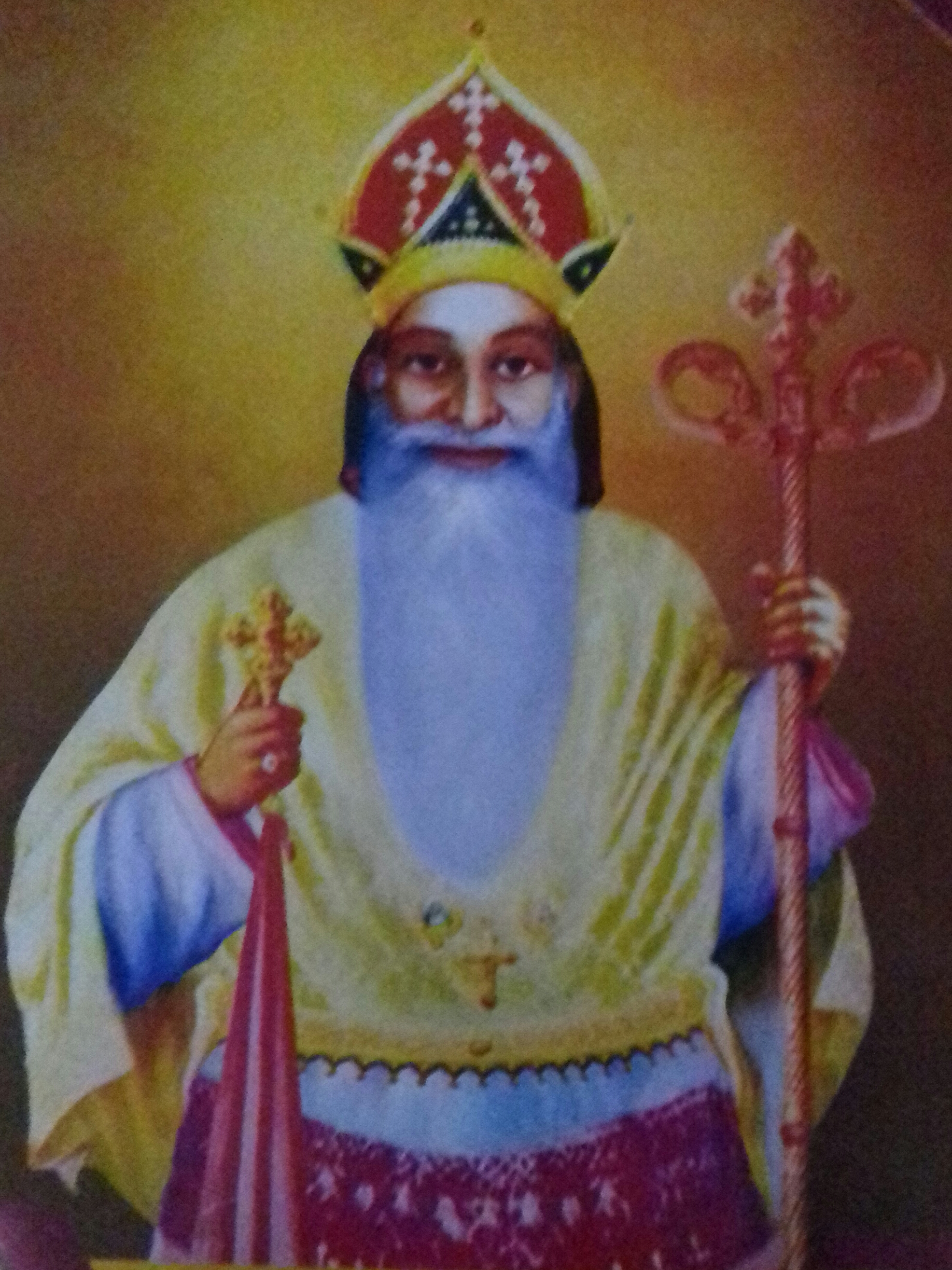
Mar Thoma III

Kadampanad Church contains the tomb of Mar Thoma III, also known as "Kadampanad Vallyappuppan". He was born in Pakalomattom family, one of the oldest families at Kadamattom. He was the third Metropolitan from Pakalomattom family and the Malankara Metropolitan of the Malankara Orthodox Syrian Church. He died on 21 April 1688 while he was in this church and on 22 April 1688 was buried at the altar of the St. Thomas Valiyapally, now St. Thomas Orthodox Cathedral.

== Marthoman Pilgrim Center ==
The Cathedral was declared as the "Marthoman Pilgrim Center" on 7 March 2010 by The Malankara Metropolitan and the Catholicos of the Malankara Church His Holiness Baselios Thoma Didymos I.

== Image gallery ==
Script on stone slab

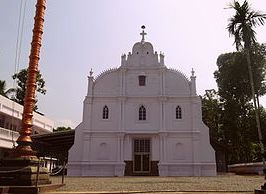

== See also ==
- Malankara Orthodox Syrian Church
- Baselios Mar Thoma Paulose II
- Nasrani
- Saint Thomas Christian Churches
- Thumpamon Church
- Kannamcode Cathedral
- Kadampanad
