= Claudius Buchanan =

Scottish theologian

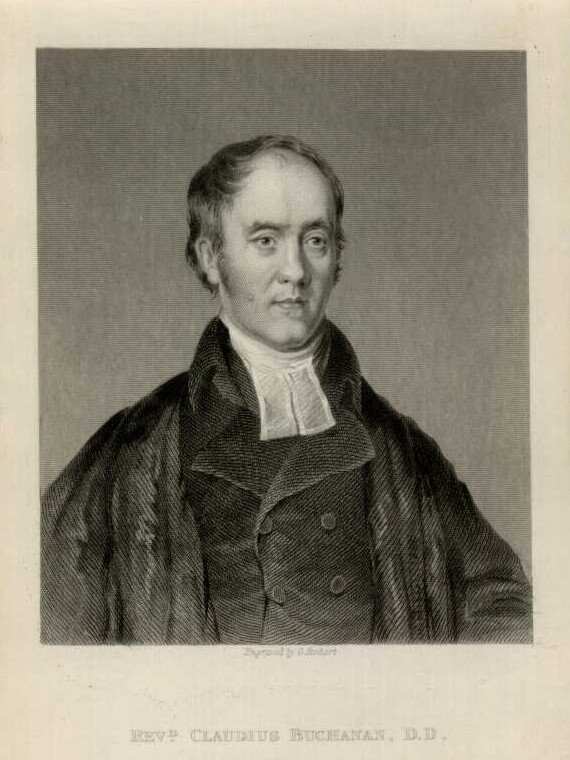
- Born: 12 March 1765; Cambuslang, Lanarkshire
- Died: 9 February 1815 (aged 48); Broxbourne, Hertfordshire
- Education: University of Glasgow; Queens' College, Cambridge
- Occupation: Theologian

Claudius Buchanan FRSE (12 March 1765 – 9 February 1815) was a Scottish theologian, an ordained minister of the Church of England, and an evangelical missionary for the Church Missionary Society. He served as Vice Provost of the College of Calcutta in India.

== Early life ==
Buchanan was born in Cambuslang near Glasgow in 1765 and baptised Claud. His father, Alexander Buchanan, was the local schoolmaster in Inverary.

He was educated at the University of Glasgow and the Queens' College, Cambridge. He was ordained in 1795 by the Bishop of London.

== India ==
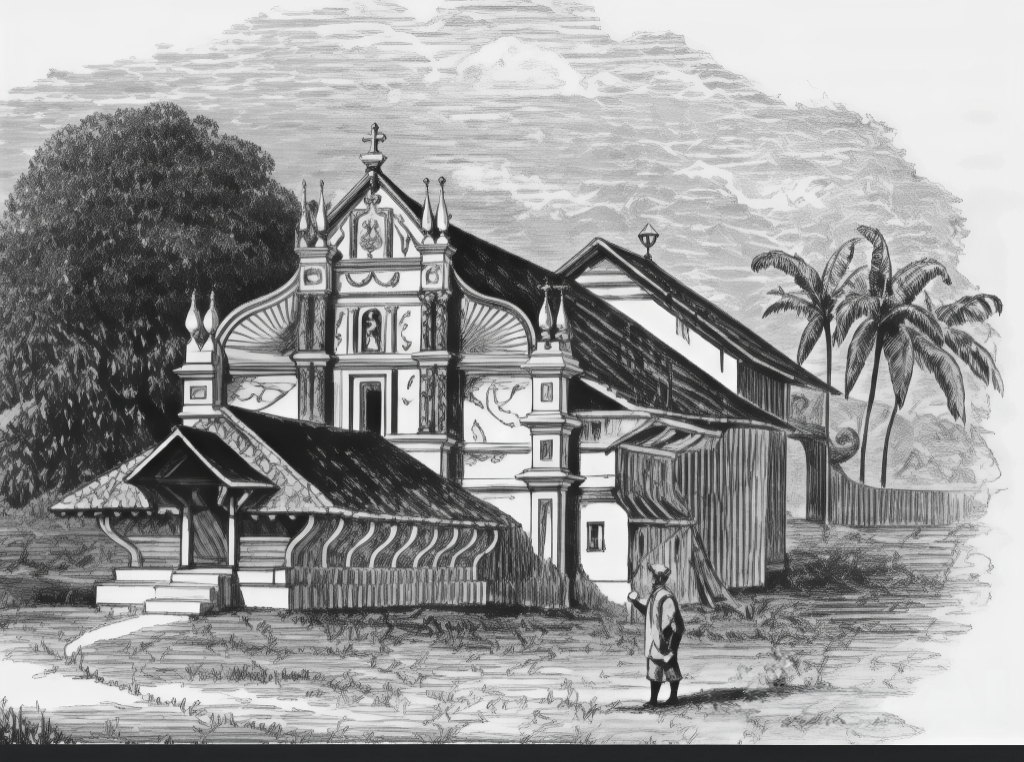
Old Karingachira Church which was seen by Anglican Missionary Dr. Claudius Buchanan in 1806

After holding a chaplaincy in India at Barrackpur (1797–1799), Buchanan was appointed Calcutta chaplain and vice-principal of the college of Fort William. In this capacity he did much to advance Christianity and native education in India, especially by organizing systematic translations of the scriptures.

== First Malayalam Bible ==
During a visit to Malabar in 1806, present day South-western state of Kerala, he visited Mar Thoma VI, head of the Malankara Church at Angamali, near Kochi. Mar Thoma was very happy to hear Buchanan's intention of translating the Bible into Malayalam, the local language, and he presented a Syriac Bible said to be of some antiquity to Buchanan. The Bible was subsequently deposited among the Oriental Manuscripts in the public library of the University of Cambridge.

Work on translation was started the same year by Pulikkottil Joseph Ittoop and Kayamkulam Philipose Ramban, with further assistance from Colonel (later General) Colin Macaulay. Macaulay was British Resident of Travancore at that time. As well as being a senior administrator, Macaulay was a gifted linguist with a keen personal interest in the Christian and Jewish heritage and communities of Travancore. He actively supported Buchanan, attending meetings with senior church leaders as well as facilitating audiences with the Rajah of Travancore to secure his approval too. Buchanan asked Macaulay to undertake the task of supervising the translators. By early 1808 the manuscript was complete and awaiting printing. In March of that year Buchanan left India for England leaving Macaulay in sole charge of the operation.

In January 1806, Buchanan was elected a Fellow of the Royal Society of Edinburgh. He was also created an honorary Doctor of Divinity by Cambridge University.

He died in Broxbourne in Herefordshire in 1815 where he was superintending an edition of the Syriac Scriptures (cf. his extensive memorial inscription). He is buried, along with his wife Mary and two infant children, in the churchyard of Holy Trinity, Little Ouseburn, North Yorkshire. His former residence, Moat Hall, is adjacent to the church.

=== Juggernaut ===
Buchanan was influential in introducing the Jagannath tradition and Hinduism to Western audiences in the early 19th century. He called Jagannath "Juggernaut" and Hindu "Hindoo" in the letters he wrote from India. According to Michael J. Altman, a professor of Religious Studies, Buchanan presented Hinduism through "Juggernaut", as a "bloody, violent, superstitious and backward religious system" that needed to be eliminated and substituted with the Christian gospel. He described "Juggernaut" with Biblical terminology for his audience, called him the Moloch, and his shrine as Golgatha – the place where Jesus Christ was crucified – but with the difference that the "Juggernaut tradition" was of endless meaningless bloodshed, and fabricating allegations that children were sacrificed in the "valley of idolatrous blood shed to false gods". In his letters, states Altman, Buchanan "constructed an image of Juggernaut as the diametric opposite of Christianity". In his book Christian Researches in Asia, published in 1811, Buchanan built on this theme and added licentiousness to it. He called hymns in the language he did not comprehend as "obscene stanzas", artworks on temple walls as "indecent emblems", and described "Juggernaut" and Hinduism to his readers as the religion of disgusting Moloch and false gods. Buchanan's writings formed the "first images of Indian religions" to the evangelical audience in the early 19th century and were promoted by American magazines such as The Panoplist. His book on "Juggernaut" attracted enough reader demand that it went through numerous editions.

Buchanan's pamphlets moved Christian missionaries and triggered a bitter debate between them and officials of the East India Company. His writings led to many emotional sermons and mission advocates lectured on the need to "combat immorality and convert the unsaved" Indians. The writings of Buchanan and other missionaries constructed and exploited cultural and religious differences, which had a profound and lasting effect on how Americans saw non-Christian peoples.

== Works ==
His main work was an account of his travels in the south and west of India and called Christian Researches in Asia (Cambridge, 1811). Shortly before publication, in December 1810 Buchanan (whose health was failing) had asked Colin Macaulay (also recently returned to England) to revise any parts of the manuscript he thought appropriate. He also asked Macaulay to choose the book's title. Upon publication the book became an immediate bestseller, being republished twelve times over the next two years.

After Buchanan's return to the United Kingdom in 1808, he still took an active part in matters connected with India, and, by his book entitled Colonial Ecclesiastical Establishment (London, 1813), he assisted in settling the controversy of 1813, which eventually ended in the establishment of an Anglican Indian episcopate in 1878 in the Travancore-Cochin states. This church, known as CMS Church, merged with other churches in South India on 27 September 1947 to form The Church of south India (CSI).

A collection of 'Sermons on interesting subjects' by Buchanan was printed for J. Ogle in Edinburgh in 1812. It consists of the texts of eight sermons preached in the Britain between 26 February 1809 and 2 June 1811. The first sermon was entitled "The Star in the East". It was preached in the parish church of St James, Bristol, on the author's return from India.
