= Colin Macaulay =

Scottish general and abolitionist (1760–1836)

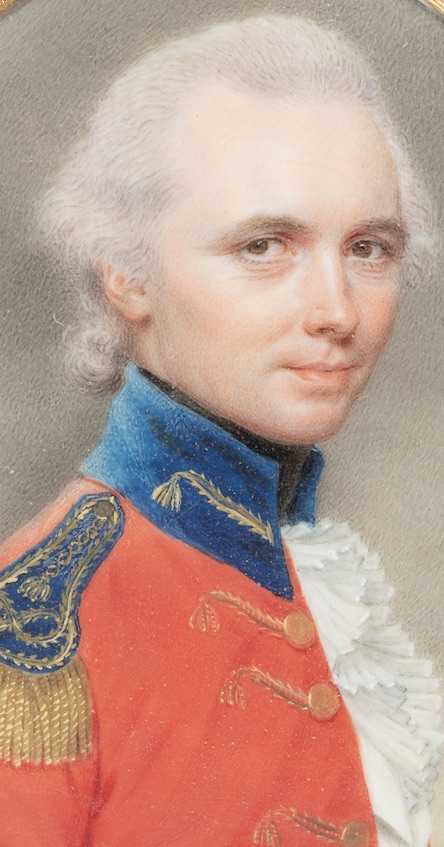
Lieutenant Colin Macaulay, 1792, by John Smart, by permission of the Provost & Fellows of Kings College, Cambridge

Colin Macaulay (13 April 1760 – 20 February 1836), was a Scottish general, biblical scholar and key activist in the campaign to abolish slavery.

== Early life ==
Macaulay was a son of the Rev. John Macaulay (1720–1789), minister in the Church of Scotland, grandson of Dòmhnall Cam. and his mother was Margaret Campbell. He had eleven brothers and sisters, including Zachary Macaulay, one of the prime movers in the Abolition of Slavery campaign throughout the British Empire, as well as the Governor of Sierra Leone (a British settlement for freed slaves from America). Another brother was the Rev. Aulay Macaulay, scholar and antiquary.

Whilst much has been written of the early life of his brothers, little is known about Colin's upbringing. However, his education must have been formative as he became in later life a distinguished linguist with extensive knowledge of classical and modern languages, history and literature, and he wrote with a polished style. It is possible that he studied at the Parish School in Inverary and later at Cardross.

== East India Company Army ==
Macaulay was enrolled as a Cadet in the East India Army at India House on 11 February 1777, not quite aged seventeen. He embarked for India a year later on 27 April 1778 and eventually served in India for over thirty years.

=== Early Campaigns ===
He was twice on the scene at Seringapatam, the headquarters of Hyder Ali and Tipu Sultan. Firstly, during the Second Mysore War, he was captured and held prisoner at Seringapatam for almost 3 and a half years (1780-1784) along with Sir David Baird and several other British officers. Incidentally this did not stop his promotion to Lieutenant on 10 March 1782 or his appointment on the same date as aide-de-camp to Major-General William Medows, Commander-in-Chief of the Madras Army - a position he retained for at least ten years.

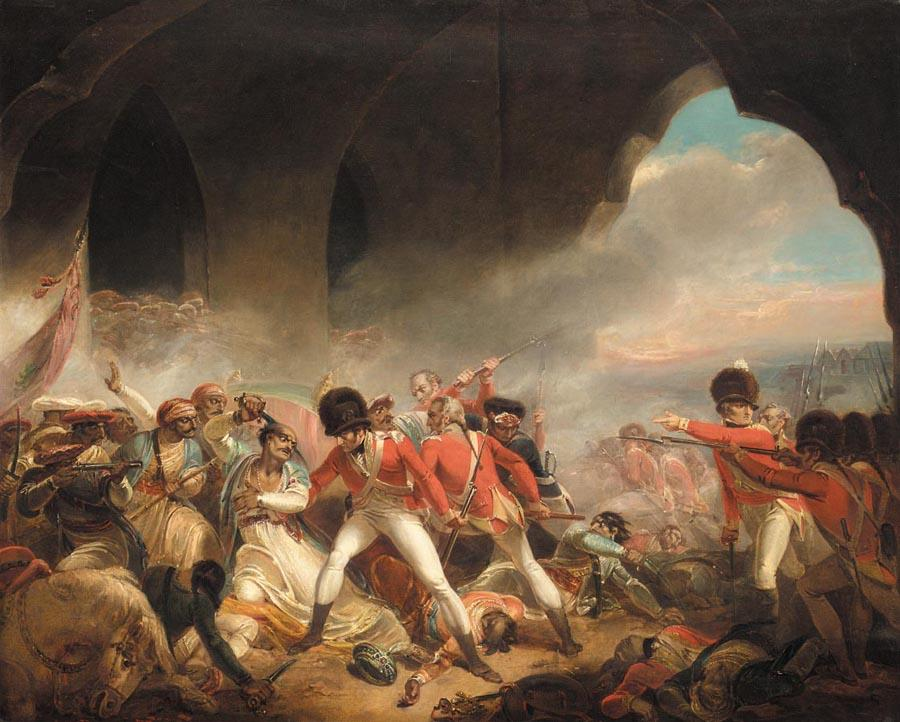
The Last Effort and Fall of Tippoo Sultaun by Henry Singleton, 1800

He also played a key role in the Fourth Mysore War and at its successful conclusion; the Siege of Seringapatam (1799). This success established Britain's position in southern India. He regulated and arranged the supplies for the army, and with a fellow officer identified a secure southern route for one of the forces (led by General George Harris) in their final approach. For this service he was subsequently recognized in a special General Orders issued by the Governor-General, and awarded the Seringapatam Gold Medal.

During this campaign he was also secretary to a Military Commission headed by Col. Arthur Wellesley (later Duke of Wellington). The Commission had been set up Wellesley's brother Lord Mornington, who was the Governor-General. It was to report events directly to him and well as to conduct any negotiations which might be originated by Tipu. Wellesley and Macaulay remained friends and corresponded for many years after.

Macaulay also served in the Third Mysore War but information about this is sparse and he was on furlough back in the U.K. twice during this period. An additional post he did occupy between 1795 and 1803 was Barrack Master, Southern Division.

=== Resident of Travancore & Cochin ===
He was appointed by the British East India Company as Resident of the Travancore and Cochin from 1800-1810, acting as the Governor-General's ambassador and advisor and ensuring taxes due to the Company were paid. Here he became a successful administrator at a time of great political unrest but at one point was the victim of an assassination attempt, when his house in Cochin was attacked. He survived this by retreating for safely to a frigate anchored in the harbour.

=== Home Leave & Furlough ===
Macaulay was granted leave to go on temporary furlough three times during his India service; in 1788, 1792 and 1803. However, In 1810, ill health led him to return home from India for good. His brother Zachary wrote that he had arrived "in a very emaciated and enfeebled state. He had been very ill during the passage". After an initial recovery, he suffered many more bouts of ill health.

For the next 25 years he remained in the UK on furlough (with occasional trips to Europe) but still received regular promotions, a salary and command of regiments in the East India Company Army; Colonel (1812), Major General (1814) and Lieutenant General (1830).

== Biblical work ==
Both in India and later back home he pursued an interest in biblical scholarship. He also promoted the interests of the British and Foreign Bible Society in its ambition to support the translation of the Bible into vernacular languages.

=== Quilon Plates ===
Whilst Resident of Travancore, he located and rescued the long lost Quilon Syrian copper plates (otherwise known as the Quilon, or Kortan or Tarisapalli Plates). These possibly date from the 9th century and bear inscriptions in Tamil and other ancient scripts, setting out old privileges granted to the Syriac Church. How Macaulay rescued these plates remains a mystery, but he presented them to the Syriac Church and also had replicas made, one set of which is now in the Cambridge University Library.

=== Bible Translation into Malayalam ===
He worked with the Rev. Claudius Buchanan to secure agreement from the Rajah of Travancore, as well as senior local clerics, to create the first translation of the Bible into Malayalam. Buchanan also appointed Macaulay to supervise the actual bible translation work, and well as choose the title of his subsequently best-selling book - which was an account of Buchanan's travels in the south and west of India; Christian Researches in Asia (Cambridge, 1811). Upon publication the book became an immediate bestseller, being republished twelve times over the next two years.

=== Codex Zacynthius ===
In 1820 he visited the island of Zante in Greece on behalf of the (then) British and Foreign Bible Society. Whilst there he met Prince Comuto, who had been President of the Septinsular Republic. Comuto's Palace was famous for its library and its works of art. The library contained the Codex Zacynthius which Comuto presented to Macaulay, personally inscribed, as a mark of his esteem. On his return to England Macaulay gave it to the British and Foreign Bible Society.

Today the Codex Zacynthius is recognised as one of the most important palimpsests of its kind. It was sold by the Bible Society to the Cambridge University Library in 2014 for £1.1 million.

== Return to England ==
For the first ten years of his return to England, Macaulay's London base was 17 Downing Street. It was loaned by the owner, his brother-in-law, the M.P. and abolitionist Thomas Babington. The arrangement lasted until 1820, when the men had a falling out for an unrecorded reason. In 1812 Macaulay purchased a 247-acre farm near Lowesby, in Leicestershire. As it was let out, from the year of purchase until Macaulay's death, it was presumably just an investment.

Macaulay also felt the cold badly and as a result often spent the winter months in France, Italy and the Mediterranean. He also stayed at various health resorts in England, including Cheltenham and Harrogate.

He never appears to have bought or leased a residence for himself in England; it seems therefore that his joking remark that his travelling carriage was his only freehold should be taken literally.

== Public life ==
Macaulay took a part in public affairs, but his parliamentary career was possibly limited because of his ongoing health problems. In January 1811 he wrote that ‘if I could support sitting up at night I would become a Member of the House of Commons, but I must relinquish all thoughts of this during the winter’.

On two occasions he put himself forward as a candidate for Parliament. In 1812 he was persuaded to stand in a by-election for Lewes, but withdrew realising his opponent had more support. Fourteen years later he was sufficiently recovered from a recent ‘severe illness’ to sit in Parliament for one Session (from 1826 to 1830) as Member for Saltash as a Whig. However, his health remained ‘feeble’ and he rarely attended the House. He made no recorded speeches but voted several times on anti-slavery and other issues.

=== Abolition of slavery ===
In addition to his biblical work, Macaulay's chief occupation was to support the campaign for the Abolition of Slavery campaign, both in British overseas territories and further afield, notably France. He became a member of the Society for Effecting the Abolition of the Slave Trade and worked closely with William Wilberforce, his brother Zachary, and (until the quarrel in 1820), his brother-in-law Thomas Babington.

He accompanied the Duke of Wellington to the Congress of Verona in 1822, where Britain submitted proposals for the entire Abolition of the Slave Trade. Macaulay attended in an unofficial capacity and represented Wilberforce and Zachary. They valued his fluency in French and Italian and his personal friendship with Wellington, developed over twenty years earlier during their military campaigning in India. Macaulay shared accommodation with the Quaker abolitionist William Allen and had several conversations with Wellington, urging him to secure agreement from the French government to end the French slave trade in practice as well as theory. The French trade had been officially abolished in 1818 but there had been virtually no enforcement, and in fact it had expanded. Unfortunately whilst Wellington agreed with Macaulay and Allen's aims, his view was that securing agreement would be impossible as the French were completed uninterest in abolition. Their efforts were ultimately fruitless.

== Family ==
Macaulay never married and despite the rift with his brother-in-law Thomas Babington was much loved by his relatives. Sir George Otto Trevelyan, who was born too late to know him personally, but was certainly acquainted with many who did wrote that Colin 'was generous in a high degree, and the young people owed to him in books which they otherwise could never have obtained, and treats and excursions which formed the only recreations that broke the uniform current of their lives. They regarded their Uncle Colin as the man of the world of the Macaulay family'.

== Death ==
One of his favourite places was Clifton near Bristol and it was there he died on 20 February 1836. His funeral was held in St Andrew's Church, Clifton on 27 February and he was buried in its churchyard.

Parliament of the United Kingdom
Preceded by Henry Monteith; Andrew Spottiswoode	Member of Parliament for Saltash; 1826 – 1830; With: Andrew Spottiswoode	Succeeded by John Gregson; Earl of Darlington
