= Abraham Seraphim =

Oriental Orthodox bishop

H.G. Dr. Abraham Mar Seraphim
- Church: Malankara Orthodox Syrian Church
- Diocese: Thumpamon Diocese
- In office: 2010 – Present

Orders
- Ordination: 12 May 2010

Personal details
- Born: 28 December 1969 (age 56)

H.G. Dr. Abraham Mar Seraphim is a Metropolitan of Thumpamon Diocese of Malankara Orthodox Syrian Church.
