= Kadampanad =

- village
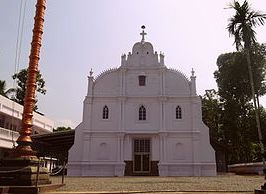
- Kadampanad Cathedral
- Interactive map of Kadampanad
- Coordinates: 9°7′0″N 76°41′0″E
- Country: India
- State: Kerala
- District: Pathanamthitta

Population (2011)
  - Total: 26,909

Languages
  - Official: Malayalam, Hindi, English
- Time zone: UTC+5:30 (IST)
- PIN: 691553
- Telephone code: +91 4734-XXXXXX
- Vehicle registration: KL-26
- Nearest city: Adoor
- Lok Sabha constituency: Pathanamthitta
- Vidhan Sabha constituency: Adoor
- Website: https://kadampanad.com/

Kadampanad grama panchayath is the southernmost part of Pathanamthitta district. It comes under Parakkode block of Adoor taluk. The panchayath shared boundaries with Erathu panchayath in the north, Ezhamkulam panchayath in the east, Kunnathur panchayath and Kalladayar in the south and Pallikkal and Poruvazhy Panchayaths in the west. Kakkathikkunnu in the north and Pandimalakkunnu (Pandimalappuram) in the south stands as two strong forts in this panchayath which balances the climatic conditions of this area.

The Kadampanad region has a Malankara Orthodox majority population.

Kadampanad, Kallukuzhi, Thuvayoor and Mannadi areas form Kadampanad panchayath. Mannadi is known as the place where Veluthambi Dalawa, the great freedom fighter, died.

== Etymology ==
The name Kadampanad might have been derived from the word " khada nadu". There is also a belief that this place was occupied by Kadampa dynasty kings and hence the name Kadampanad was derived.

== History ==
It is mentioned in many literary works of Sangha period like "Pathittupathu" that Kadampanad was a part of ancient Tamil Nadu. The beautiful architecture of Parakkadavu snanaghatas and kalmandapas, built on the banks of Kallada river, in connection with the Pazhayakavu and Puthiyakavu devi temple of Mannadi are proofs of ancient civilization in this place. Kadampanad was a trade center in the ancient period. Under the Kulashekhara kings, who ruled Travancore with Mahodayapuram as their headquarters, there were many autonomous provinces. Kadampanad was such a province under the control of a Naduvazhi. After the decline of Kulasekhara reign, Kadampanad came under the rule of Venad Kings. Later, Kadamapanad became the part of Kayamkulam territory and when Marthanda Varma formed modern Travancore, it fell under this region. When Sir C.P. Ramaswamy Iyyer was the Divan of Central Travancore, Village uplift unions were formed for the development of villages in Kerala. The village uplift unions were composed of Government nominated representatives. The places come under Kadampanad grama panchayath were part of Kunnathur uplift union at that time. Thonnuram Panthiyil K. Kesavakurup was the president of Kunnathur uplift union. In 1953, when panchayaths formed, panchayath bodies elected by people came into being. The first president of the elected body of Kadampanad panchayath was Koyippurath K. Neelakandan Nair. After the formation of Kerala State, Kadampanad panchayath continued to be a part of Kollam district, under Kunnathur Taluk. In 1983, when Pathanamthitta district was formed, Kadampanad panchayath became a part of it.

== Geography ==
Kadampanad panchayath covers an area of 23.95 km^{2}. The land is situated in a slanting position from east to west and from south to north. Kallada and Pallickal rivers flow along the south and west sides of the panchayat respectively. The land consists of hilly areas, plains and paddy fields. Paddy, coconut and tapioca were cultivated abundantly in this region. Mannadi and Thuvayoor are two important places in this panchayath. Major portion of Thuvayoor was laid down as a corridor in the east–west direction between the Kakkathikkunnu and Pandimalakkunnu.

== Divisions ==
There are 17 wards in Kadampanad grama panchayath.

== Demographics ==
As per the 2011 India census, Kadampanad has a population of 26909 with 12548 males and 14361 females. The literacy rate as per the census data is 95.01%.

== Culture ==
=== Religious ===
St. Thomas Orthodox Cathedral (Kadampanad Church), St. John’s Orthodox Syrian Church Thuvayoor, St. George Malankara Catholic Church, Shalom Marthoma Church, St. Andrew's Marthoma Church, '''St. Mary's orthodox church kadampanad north''', St. Thomas Catholic Church, St. Mary’s Catholic Church, St. Thomas Marthoma Church, St. Peter's Marthoma Church, Lourdes Matha Church and St. James CSI Church are the Christian devotional centres in this panchayath.The Church of God at Thuvayoor is the first Pentecostal church in Kerala. The Jama-ath mosques in Mannadi and Nilakkal are also part of the diverse culture of this place.

The Kadampanad Bhagavathy Temple and the Kundom Vettuthu Malanada temple, Kochuveettil Bhagavathy temple, the Maharshi Mangalam temple in Thuvayoor, the Kannankara Yakshi temple in Manjali junction, the Mudippura Devi temple, Pazhayakavu and Puthiyakavu Devi temples in Mannadi are the important temples in Kadampanad Panchayath. Kadampanad panchayath consists of 8 other temples also.

== Tourist Spots ==
The memorial of Veluthambi Dalawa and the Aravakkalu Chani Cave in Mannadi are places of tourist attractions. The Kerala institute of folklore and folk arts also functions in Mannadi.

== See also ==
- Kadampanad Bhagavathy Temple
- Kadampanad Church
- Mannadi
- [Best and first Chiropractic Treatment in pathanamthitta at kadamband]
