= Thoma III =

Metropolitan bishop of Malankara Church

Mar Thoma III Mar Thoma Metropolitan
- Malankara Church
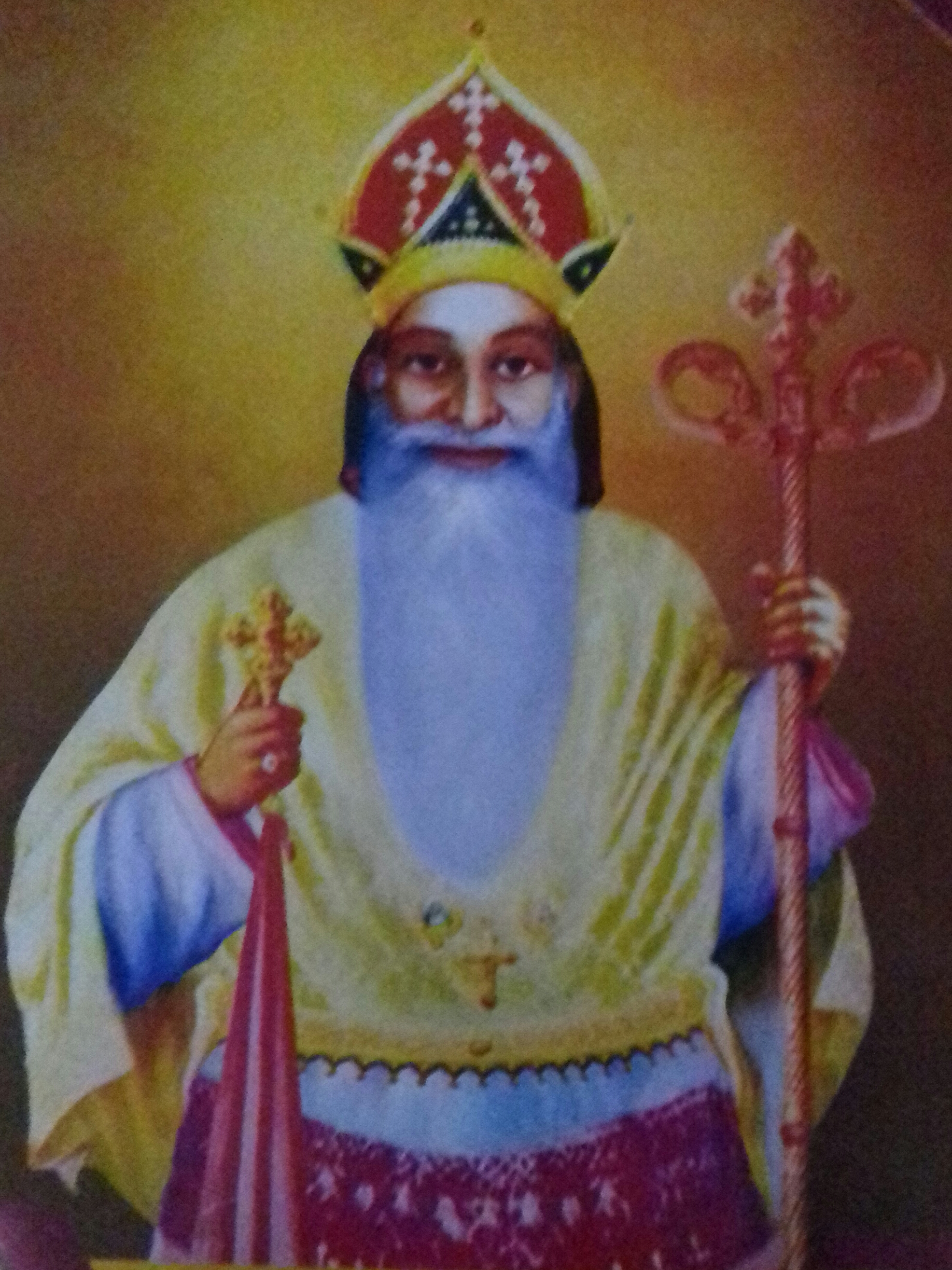
- Mar Thoma III
- Installed: 1686
- Term ended: 22 April 1688
- Predecessor: Mar Thoma II
- Successor: Mar Thoma IV

Personal details
- Died: 21 April 1688 Kadampanad
- Buried: Kadampanad Valiyapally (St.Thomas Orthodox Cathedral, Kadampanad)

Mar Thoma III was the third metropolitan bishop who was the 3rd Metropolitan of the Malankara Church in India for a brief period from 1686 to 1688.

== Introduction ==
On the southwestern coast of India lies a small state known as Kerala. It was here in the first century, Thomas the Apostle arrived to preach the gospel. Some of the Jews and locals became followers of Jesus of Nazareth. They were known as Malabar Nasrani people and their church as Malankara Church. They followed a unique Hebrew-Syriac Christian tradition which included several Jewish elements and Indian customs.

== Early life ==
Kuravilangad is a town located in the Kottayam district of Kerala, South India. The town is situated in the Meenachil Taluk, about 22 km north of Kottayam. Pakalomattom family was one of the oldest families at Kuravilangad. The third Mar Thoma was from this family. He grew up as a man of prayer.

== Consecration ==
Mar Thoma II died suddenly on 14 April 1686, and he was buried inside Niranam church. The leaders of the Malankara Church selected Mar Thoma III as his successor. At that time Mar Ivanios Hidayuttulla who arrived in Kerala in 1685 was the only bishop in Malankara. So Mar Ivanios consecrated Mar Thoma in 1686.

== Administration ==
Malankara church had comparatively a peaceful time during his tenure. It was during this time some members of Karingachira parish joined the Catholics. But majority of them supported Mar Thoma III and rejected the authority of Roman bishop Joseph Sebastani.

In those days traveling from one place to another was very tedious and it was mainly by river. Yet Mar Thoma III tried to visit as many parishes as possible.

== Last days ==
Kadampanad is a very fertile land near Adoor in the Pathanamthitta district. Christians there believe that they came from Nilakkal (a first-century Christian settlement) and built a church at a place called ‘’Nilakkal Mukal’’ there in AD 325 known as St. Thomas church. Later it was moved to the present position and was named St. George's Valiyapally. Later on renamed as St Thomas Orthodox Cathedral, Kadampanad and recently was made a Marthoman Pilgrim centre by the Orthodox Syrian Church.

It was to this church, Mar Thoma made a visit in 1688. While he was there, he had a sudden death on 21 April 1688 and was interred there.

Malankara Church Titles
Preceded by Mar Thoma II	Metropolitan of the Malankara Church; 1686–1688	Succeeded by Mar Thoma IV

== See also ==
- Malankara Orthodox Syrian Church
- Mar Thoma Church
- Malankara Jacobite Syriac Orthodox Church
- Kadampanad Church
