= Thoma II =

Second Metropolitan of the Malankara Church

Mar Thoma II Malankara Metropolitan
- Malankara Church
- Installed: 1670
- Term ended: 1686
- Predecessor: Mar Thoma I
- Successor: Mar Thoma III

Orders
- Consecration: 1670

Personal details
- Died: 14 April 1686 Niranam
- Buried: Niranam Church (St.Mary's Orthodox Syrian Church, Niranam)

Mar Thoma II was the second Metropolitan of the Malankara Church from 1670 to 1686.

== Introduction ==
The Malayalam versions of the Canons of the Synod of Diamper use these titles throughout the report except in three places where they use the Latin word archidiaconus.

== Consecration ==
The leaders of the Puthenkoor Malankara Syrian Church selected a nephew (brother's son) of Thoma I as his successor. He was consecrated by Thoma I and the Antiochean patriarchal delegate Gregorios Abdul Jaleel who was the archbishop of Jerusalem. He was the second Thoma who ascended the throne of Malankara Syrian church. When Thoma I died on 25 April 1670 Mar Thoma II, took charge of the Church.

== Visits by foreign bishops ==
Mar Anthraos and three of his brothers from the Middle East arrived at the Mulanthuruthy church in 1678. Later on they moved to various churches and arrived at St. Mary's Orthodox Cathedral, Puthencavu (near Chengannur). On 29 February 1692 while visiting Kallada, he went to the nearby river and was drowned. Two of his brothers went back to Mulanthuruthy and raised families there. Descendants of one of them later established the Malabar Independent Syrian Church.

Malankara Church Titles
Preceded by Mar Thoma I	Metropolitan of the Malankara Church; 1670–1686	Succeeded by Mar Thoma III

== See also ==
- Malankara Church
- Malankara Orthodox Syrian Church
- Malabar Independent Syrian Church
- Marthoma Syrian Church
