= Dionysious V =

His Eminence Mor Dionysious V Malankara Metropolitan
- Church: Malankara Church
- See: Malankara
- Elected: 1865
- Predecessor: Mathews Mar Athanasius Metropolitan
- Successor: Mar Dionysius VI (Geevarghese Dionysius of Vattasseril)

Orders
- Ordination: 18 August 1852 by Euyakim Mar Coorilos (not to be confused with Euyakim Mar Coorilos of the Malankara Marthoma Syrian Church)
- Consecration: 7 May 1865 by Ignatius Jacob II Patriarch
- Rank: Malankara Metropolitan (disputed with Mathews Mar Athanasius and Thomas Mar Athanasius 1865-1889, undisputed 1889-1909)

Personal details
- Born: Joseph; November 12, 1833 Kunnamkulam, Kerala
- Died: July 11, 1909 (aged 75) Kottayam
- Buried: Orthodox Theological Seminary, Kottayam

Mor Dionysious Joseph II Pulikkottil, also known as Dionysious V (12 November 1833 – 11 July 1909), was the Traditionalist claimant to the Metropolitanate of the Malankara Church from 1865 to 1889, and undisputed 14th Metropolitan from 1889 until his death in 1909.

== Early life ==
Josephwas born as the son of Tharu Kurien and Thandamma, daughter of Paingamukku Kuthooru Geevarghese Kathanaar, on 12 November 1833, into the family of Pulikkottil (Kunnamkulam). Pulikkottil is a family which moved from Arthat and settled in Kunnamkulam. Tharu Kurien, a member of this family was the nephew of Mor Dionysious Joseph I Pulikkottil .

In addition to theology and Syriac he learned Sanskrit and Hindustani at Kunnamkulam.

== Ordination ==
He received the deaconship from Cheppad Mar Dionysius on 6 October 1846 and on 18 August 1853 he was ordained as a priest by Metropolitan Yuyakim Mar Kurilos at Challiserry church.

On 29 April 1865 at Ameed (modern day Diyarbakır), Patriarch Yakoob II elevated him to the rank of Ramban. On 30 April he was consecrated as Metropolitan Joseph Mar Dionysios.

== Malankara Metropolitan ==
During the eventful forty-four years between 1865 A.D to 1909 he adorned the Malankara Metropolitan's position with extraordinary skill. It was during his period that the Mulanthuruthy Synod presided by Ignatius Peter IV Patriarch of Antioch, division of dioceses and the 'Holy Mooran Koodasha' took place. Through his unstinting effort, spiritual organisations like Sunday School and Students movement, and Church institutions like Parumala Seminary, Kunnamkulam Sehiyon Bungalow, Kottapuram Seminary and Kottayam M.D. Seminary developed.

=== Golden Jubilee ===
In 1901, the grand occasion of the golden jubilee of Ordination of Mar Dionysius V was celebrated like a festival in the city of Kottayam.

=== Student movement ===
During his reign as Malankara Metropolitan, the prominent clergy, laymen and zealous students including members of the diaspora came together with the idea of initiating a Students' Movement of the Church by late 1907. The first annual conference of this Movement was held at Balikamadom School, Thiruvalla on 1, 2 and 3 January 1908 with the blessings of Mar Dionysius V. During this conference, Rev Fr. V. J. Geevarghese Ramban (of Vattasseril) made a captivating speech on 'The Rituals in our Church'. This Movement grew in strength and stretch, expanding its reach to the students abroad with the motto Worship, Study, Service, assuming the name Mar Gregorios Christian Students Movement commemorating St. Gregorios of Parumala by Mor Athanasius Paulose Kuttikkattil, Metropolitan of the Syrian Orthodox Church.

== Last days ==
After entrusting the responsibilities of his office to his successor Mar Dionysius VI, Pulikkottil Joseph Mar Dionysious II died on 11 July 1909. His mortal remains were interred in the northern side of the chapel in the Old Seminary (Pazhaya Seminary, known as the Orthodox Theological Seminary). The Church observes the day of his memorial on 12 July. The Episcopal Synod honoured his memory by conferring the designation "Malankara Sabha-Thejas" (Malayalam: മലങ്കര സഭാ തേജസ്‌, meaning 'radiance of the Church').

== Succession ==
Malankara Syrian Church Titles
Preceded by Mathews Mar Athanasius of Palakkunnathu	Malankara Metropolitan of the Malankara Syrian Church; 1865–1909	Succeeded by Geevarghese Mar Dionysius of Vattasseril

== Biographies ==
Of the many biographies of Mar Dionysius V published till date, one of the most authoritative works is 'The Biography of Mar Dionysius V' written and published by Kandathil Varghese Mappillai.

== See also ==
- Malankara Orthodox Syrian Church
- List of Catholicoi of the East and Malankara Metropolitans
- Pulikkottil Joseph Mar Dionysious I (Mar Thoma X)
