= Philipose Eusebius =

Bishop in India

Philipose Mar Eusebius (died 2009) was a bishop in India. From 1 August 1985 he has been designated as Assistant Metropolitan of Thumpamon Diocese and from 1990 onwards he became the Metropolitan of Thumpamon Diocese.
