= Monastery of Saint Thomas, Vettikkal =

Church in Kerala, India

Coordinates: 9.91392°N 76.42335°E

Monastery of Saint Thomas
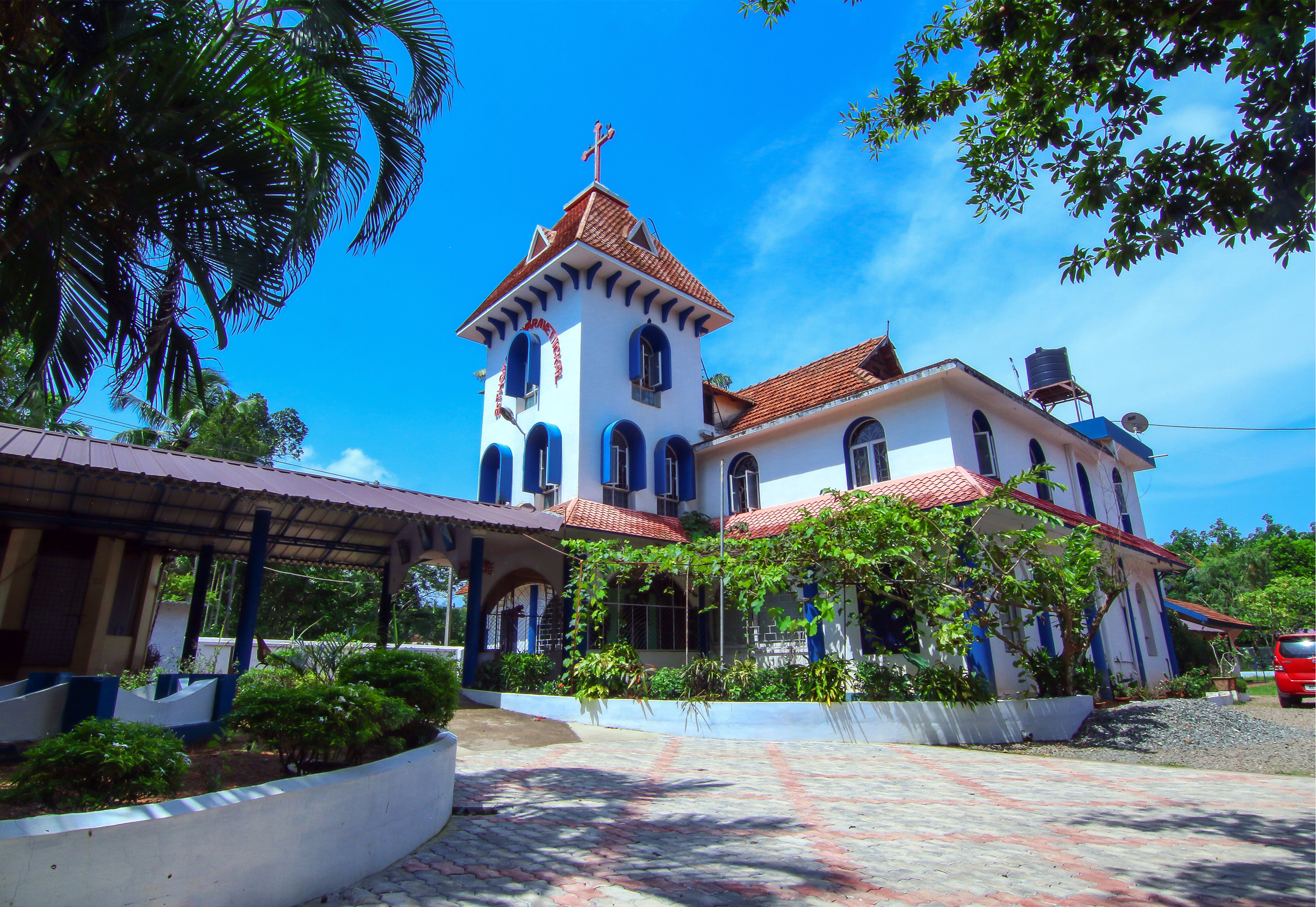
- Monastery of Saint Thomas
- Denomination: Malankara Orthodox Syrian Church

History
- Status: Monastery
- Dedication: Saint Thomas
- Events: First Holy Synod of Malankara Church

Architecture
- Style: Kerala Architecture

St. Thomas Dayara is a monastery of the Malankara Orthodox Syrian Church situated in Vettikkal, about five kilometres from Mulanthuruthy in Kerala.

== History ==
In the year 1125, on the first Sunday after Easter, a cross brought from St. Thomas Church, Mulanthuruthy was erected at Vettikkal, which was the then border point between the Royal Provinces of Kochi and Travancore, in the name of India's Apostle and our Guardian Saint Blessed St. Thomas.

This ancient Holy Cross is still retained on the east side wall of the Dayara building. In the year 1200 it was declared a Chapel.

Kattumangattu Junior Bava Geevarghese Coorilose (second Bishop of Thozhiyoor Church) who died in 1809, is buried in this Dayara. He is considered a saint by the local faithful, who celebrate his feast on 28 and 29 May. Thousands of people irrespective of religious affiliations attend this every year and receive blessings.

In 1877, Parumala Thirumeni, the Malankara Metropolitan, after 40 days of meditation and fasting, consecrated the renovated Dayara and the Holy Madbaha. Soon after the consecration ceremony, the 'first Holy Synod of Malankara Church' was conducted in the Dayara. The Malankara Church was demarcated into seven dioceses in this Synod with Bishops being assigned to each Diocese.

In 1976, Metropolitan Joseph Mar Pachomios renovated the Dayara. On 10 December 1976, in the centenary year of Parumala Thirumeni's ordination as Metropolitan, the holy relics of Parumala Thirumeni were transferred and interred here.

In 1977, on 10 December, a Chapel in the upper floor of the Dayara was consecrated by Baselios Marthoma Mathews I, the Catholicose.

== Pictures ==
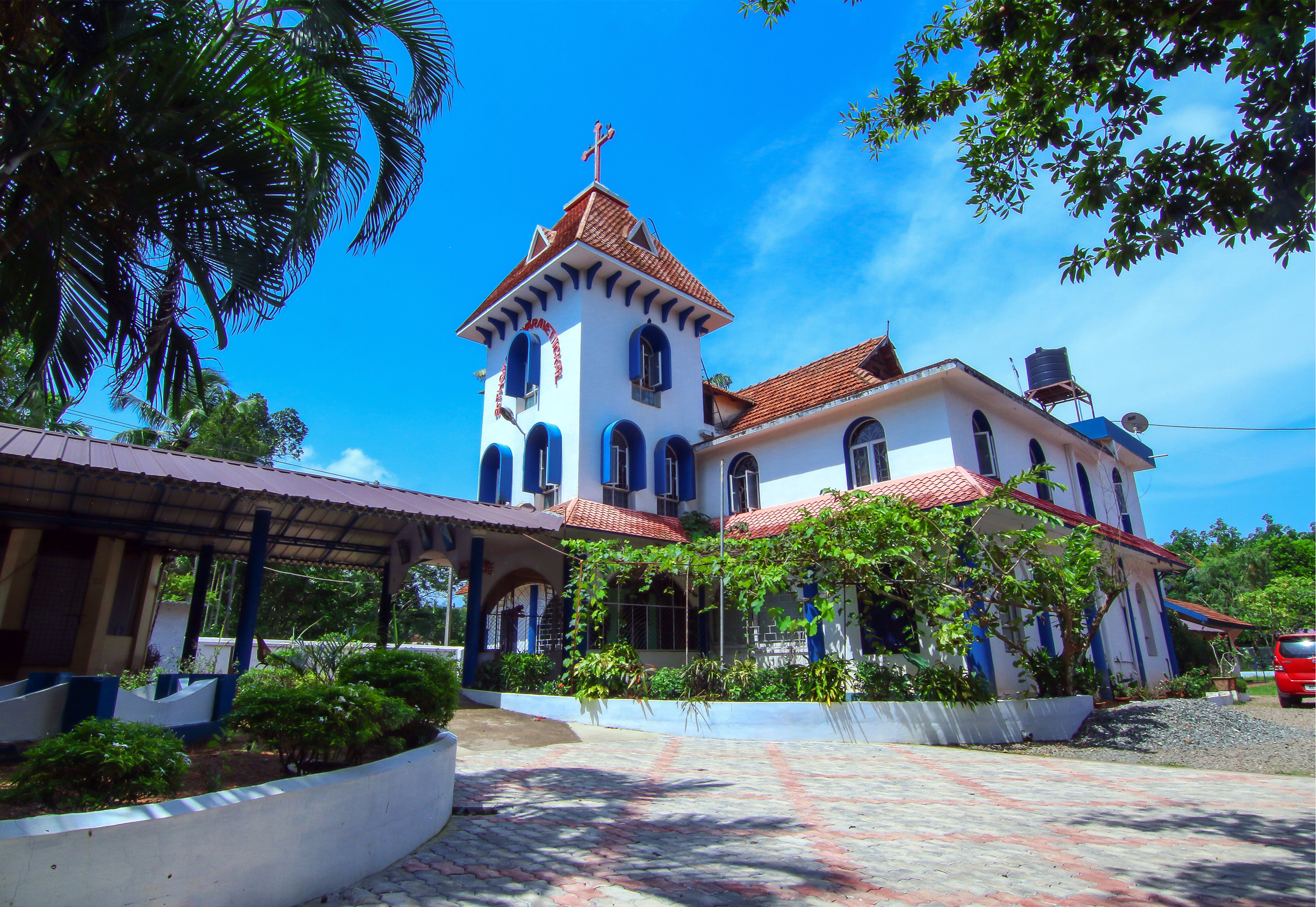
Vettickal Dayara

Vilakku

Chapel

Tombs
