= Marthoma Metropolitans =

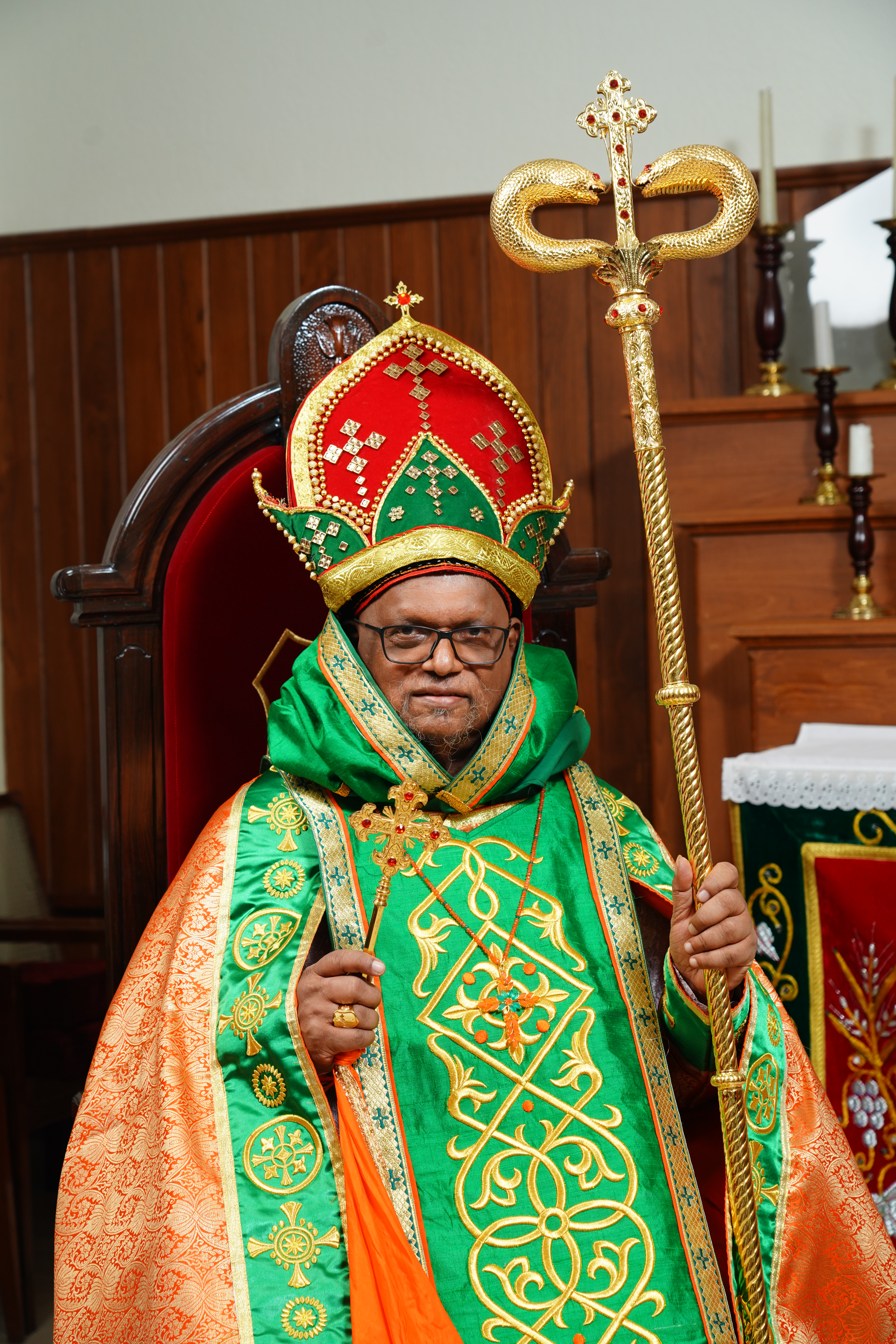
Current Malankara Syrian Metropolitan and Mar Thoma XXII, Theodosius Mar Thoma.

Mar Thoma Metropolitan is the title which is given to the Supreme Head of the Malankara Mar Thoma Syrian Church. The Malankara Church was split into different factions over the years. However the Supreme Head of the Malankara Mar Thoma Syrian Church uses the title of Mar Thoma Metropolitan upholding the autonomous character of the Malankara Mar Thoma Syrian Church. The current Mar Thoma Metropolitan of The Holy Apostolic Throne of St Thomas is Dr Theodosius Mar Thoma

This is the list of original Malankara Metropolitans.

1653 after Coonan cross oath. Marthoma I had survived a number of assassination attempts. He died on 25 April 1670 and was interred in Angamaly St Mary's Syrian Church.

1. Mar Thoma II – (1670–1686) Consecrated by Marthoma I and Mar Gregorios Abdal Jaleel. Died on 14 April 1686 and was interred at St. Mary's Orthodox Church, Niranam.
2. Mar Thoma III – (1686–1688) Consecrated by Mar Ivanios Hirudyathulla (from Antioch), died on 21 April 1688. Laid to rest at St.Thomas Orthodox Church, Kadampanad.
3. Mar Thoma IV – (1688–1728). Consecrated by Mar Ivanios Hirudyathulla. Died on 24 March 1728 and was interred at Kandanad Martha Mariam Orthodox Church.
4. Mar Thoma V – (1728–1765) – Consecrated by Marthoma IV. Died on 8 May 1765 and laid to rest at St. Marys Orthodox Church, Niranam
5. Mar Thoma VI – (1765–1808) Consecrated by Marthoma V. Died on 8 April 1808 and laid to rest at St. Mary's Ortar Coorilos as a metropolitan by a bishop from Antioch. This was the beginning of Malabar Independent Syrian Church. hodox Cathedral puthenkavu. In June 1770, he accepted re consecration from Antiochian bishops in order to avoid a split in the Church and the title Dionysius was accepted. Marthoma VI did not approve the appointment of Kattumangattu Abraham MHe was forced to conduct a service according to Chaldean Catholic rites but escaped during a rebellion in Travancore under Velu Thampi. Rev.Dr. Claudius Buchanan visited and made arrangement for the translation of the Bible into Malayalam. Marthoma presented him the Peshitto Bible written in the old Syriac. This manuscript is kept in the public library of the University of Cambridge.
6. Mar Thoma VII – (1808–1809) Consecrated by Marthoma VI in 1796. During his time on 1 December 1808, a sum of 3000 Star Pagoda (in 2002 one Star Pagoda coin had a market value of £475) was given as loan in perpetuity to the British resident Colonel Macaulay. This is known as Vattipanam. Marthoma died on 4 July 1809 and was interred at St. Peter's & St. Paul's Orthodox Church, Kolencherry.
7. Mar Thoma VIII – (1809–1816) Consecrated on 2 July 1809 by Marthoma VII. During his time Kottayam Suryani Seminary was opened and modern education began in Kerala. Marthoma died on 26 January 1816 and was interred at St. Mary's Cathedral, Puthencavu, Chengannur.
8. Mar Thoma IX – (1816). Consecrated by Mar Thoma VIII without the consent of the people. So he retired to St.George Church, and spent the rest of his days in prayer and fasting.
9. Mar Dionysius II (Mar Thoma X) – (1816)
10. Mar Dionysius III (Mar Thoma XI) – (1817–1825)
11. Mar Dionysius IV (Mar Thoma XII) – (1825–1852)
12. Mathews Mar Athanasius (Mar Thoma XIII) – (1852–1877)
13. Thomas Mar Athanasius (Mar Thoma XIV) – (1877–1889)

== Mar Thoma Metropolitans ==
1. Thomas Mar Athanasius (Mar Thoma XIV) – (1889–1893)
2. Titus I Mar Thoma XV – (1894–1909)
3. Titus II Mar Thoma XVI – (1909–1944)
4. Abraham Mar Thoma XVII – (1944–1949)
5. Juhanon Mar Thoma XVIII – (1949–1976)
6. Alexander Mar Thoma XIX – (1977–1999)
7. Philipose Mar Chrysostom Mar Thoma XX (Mar Thoma XX) – (1999–2007)
8. Joseph Mar Thoma XXI – (2007–2020)
9. Theodosius Mar Thoma XXII – (2020-)
