= Abraham Malpan =

Founder of the Malankara Mar Thomas Syrian Church (d. 1845)

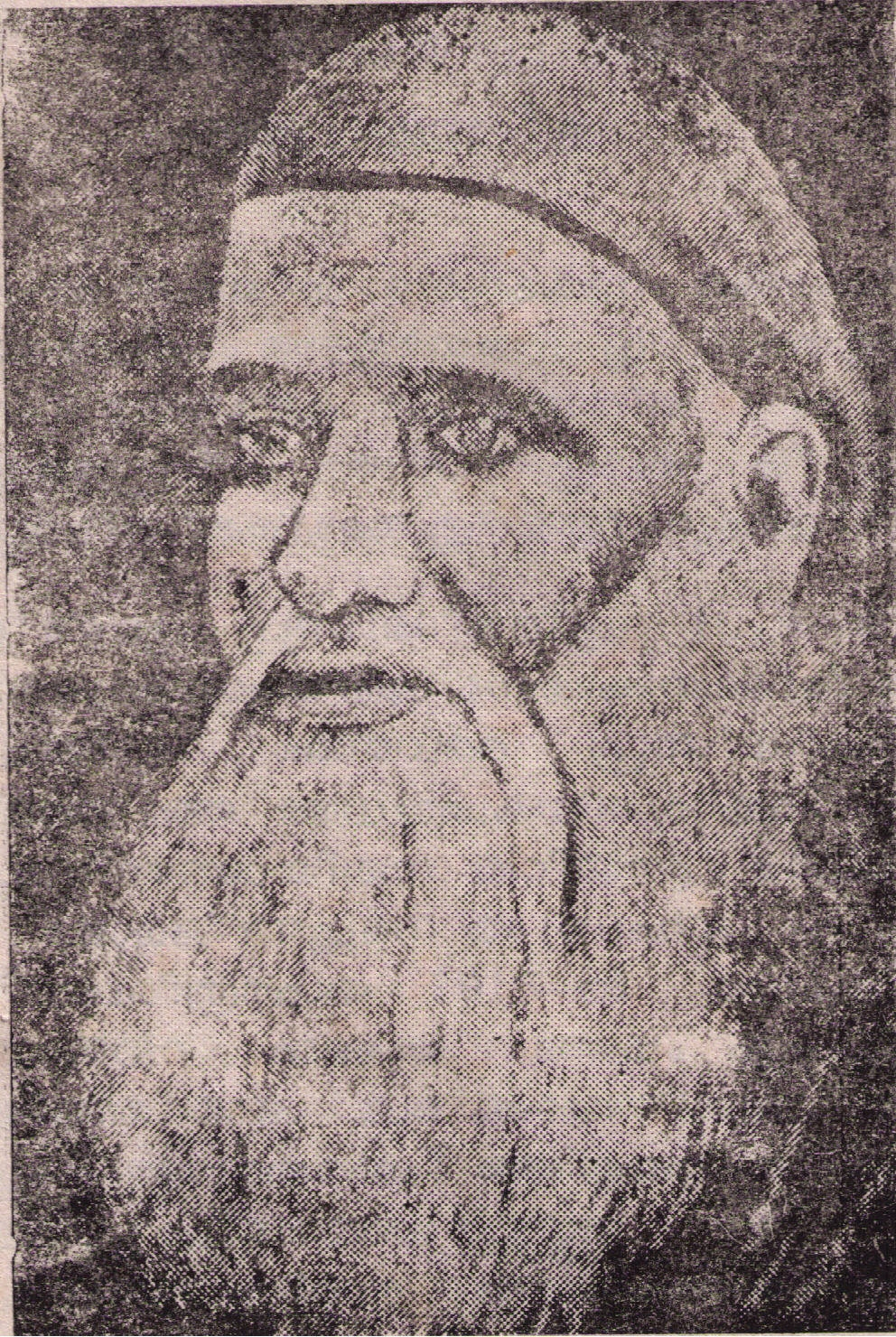
- A painting of Abraham Malpan
- Born: 30 May 1796; Kozhencherry, Travancore
- Died: 9 September 1845 (aged 49); Maramon, Travancore
- Title: Malpan
- Spouse: Aleyamma Thondamvelil
- Children: Thomas Athanasius (son); Titus I Mar Thoma (son)
- Theological work
- Era: Reformation of Malankara Church (19th century)
- Tradition or movement: Malankara Mar Thoma Syrian Church (1898)

Palakunnathu Abraham Malpan (30 May 1796 – 9 September 1845) was an Indian cleric and theologian known for the Reformation movement within the Malankara Church during the 19th century. He was born in the ancient Syrian Christian Palakunnathu family which practiced West Syriac Rite Oriental Orthodoxy after the Coonan Cross Oath of 1653.

Abraham Malpan translated and revised the West Syriac liturgy, restoring the Church to what he considered to be its position before the Synod of Diamper in 1599. He therefore strove for the abolition of auricular confession, prayers for the dead, intercession of saints, and veneration of sacraments. Further he emphasized the reading and study of the Bible, family-worship and evangelistic work. He insisted on a high moral standard of conduct for laity and clergy. All this created a ferment in the Church and its effects are still discernible in the Malankara Church as a whole. This led to the formation of the Malankara Mar Thoma Syrian Church in 1898.

== Biography ==
=== Early life ===
Palakunnathu Abraham was born on 30 May 1796 as the second son of Mathew of the Palakunnathu family and Mariamma of Pakalomattathil-Mullasseril Family in Chengannur, Kerala. His father died before he was born, and his mother died before he was three.

Abraham was brought up by his father's elder brother Palakunnathu Thomas Malpan, a Celibate hermit priest, who held the view that several practices that had entered the Malankara Church were inconsistent with biblical teachings. As Abraham’s guardian, he engaged him in discussions concerning the restoration of the Church to its pre-Synod of Diamper traditions.

==== Palakunnathu family ====
In the 17th century, Kuruvilla, a member of the Panamkuzhy family, a branch of the Pakalomattom family, settled in Kozhencherry on the banks of the Pampa River. The family later relocated to Maramon, residing at Chackkalyil on the opposite bank of the river.

Mathen, the second son of Kuruvilla, moved to a nearby residence at Palakunnathu. He had six sons and one daughter. The daughter was married into the Pavoothikunnel family, while the first four sons established households at Themoottil, Neduvelil, Periyilel, and Punamadom respectively. The fifth son became a celibate hermit priest (Palakunnathu Thomas Malpan), and the youngest son, and Mathew (father of Abraham), continued to reside at the ancestral Palakunnathu family house, which still exists.

As members of the ancient Malankara Church, the Palakunnathu family produced several prominent ecclesiastical leaders. Notable figures from the family include Abraham's older brother Mathunni's son Malankara Metropolitan Mathews Athanasius and Marthoma Metropolitans such as Abraham's sons Thomas Mar Athanasius and Titus I Mar Thoma, and other Marthoma Metropolitans such as Titus II Mar Thoma and Joseph Mar Thoma.

=== Priesthood ===
At the time, it was customary within the Church to ordain individuals as deacons at a young age. Following his primary education, Abraham was ordained as a deacon and subsequently sent to study Syriac language and liturgical orders under Padinjarekutu Korah Malpan, where he developed strong proficiency in Syriac and knowledge of Christian theology.

Abraham was ordained as a priest in 1815 by Mar Thoma VIII and later served as a Syriac professor (Malpan) at the Malankara Old Seminary in Kottayam. During this period, clerical celibacy was practised among priests, a tradition that had continued from earlier ecclesiastical arrangements, from the period of Roman Catholic influence.

With the arrival of British Anglican missionaries, encouragement was given for the discontinuation of mandatory clerical celibacy. Dionysius III of Punnathra consented to this change, after which the practice was discontinued. Abraham Malpan is recorded among the early clergy who subsequently entered into marriage with Aleyamma, daughter of Tharakan from the Thondamvelil Family of Thumpamon.

Abraham was appointed as the Vicar of Maramon parish.

=== Reformation ===
During the period of Dionysius I of Malankara, the Anglican missionary Claudius Buchanan visited Malankara and met the Metropolitan in 1806. With his assistance, efforts were undertaken to translate the Bible from its original Aramaic language into local usage, and the translated text was distributed among parishes.

Following this engagement, representatives of various parishes assembled at Arthat Church and issued the Arthat Padiola, in which they declared that the community should not adhere to teachings originating from Rome. This event is often regarded as an early development in the Sucheekarana Prasthanam (Purification or Reform Movement) within the Malankara Church.

In 1816, Dionysius II of Pulikkottil appointed Abraham Malpan as a Syriac instructor at the Kottayam Seminary.

Abraham Malpan’s uncle, Thomas Malpan's position at the Kottayam Seminary provided Abraham Malpan with the opportunity to study the Bible in Malayalam and further develop his theological understanding.

Dionysius III of Punnathra convened a meeting of representatives of the Malankara Church at Mavelikkara on 3 December 1818. During this assembly, a committee was appointed to propose and recommend reforms within the Church.

The committee included Abraham Malpan, Geevarghese Malpan of the Kaithayil family, Markose Kathanar of the Eruthikkal family, and Joseph Kathanar of the Adangapurathu family. This initiative is regarded as an early formal step in the Sucheekarana Prasthanam within the Malankara Church.

Following the death of Dionysius III, the ecclesiastical situation changed, and leadership passed to Dionysius IV of Cheppad.

Owing to doubts concerning the validity of the consecration of Thoma VIII, Abraham Malpan is reported to have expressed uncertainty regarding the legitimacy of his own ordination. During the visit of a Jacobite bishop from Syria, he and two associates underwent re-ordination under him. This act led to a complaint being filed by Dionysius IV with the Travancore government, resulting in a fine of 336 fanam (₹84) imposed on the individuals concerned for contravening episcopal authority.

In 1835, Bishop Daniel Wilson visited Kerala and made certain recommendations to Dionysius IV regarding the continuation of relations between the Syrian Church and Anglican missionaries. The Metropolitan, opposing what he perceived as external interference in ecclesiastical affairs, convened a meeting of Church representatives at Mavelikkara on 16 January 1836. The synod declared that the Jacobite Syrian Church acknowledged the authority of the Patriarch of Antioch.

=== Trumpet Call and Reforms ===
On 6 September 1836, a group of twelve senior clergy under the leadership of Abraham Malpan formulated plans to initiate ecclesiastical reform within the Malankara Church. They issued a circular outlining doctrines and practices they considered erroneous, along with a statement enumerating twenty-four practices regarded as having been introduced through contact with other churches and religious traditions.

This document was submitted as a petition to the governmental authorities. The initiative formed part of a broader process that originated from an earlier directive calling for an examination of possible reforms to be undertaken under the authority of the Metropolitan.

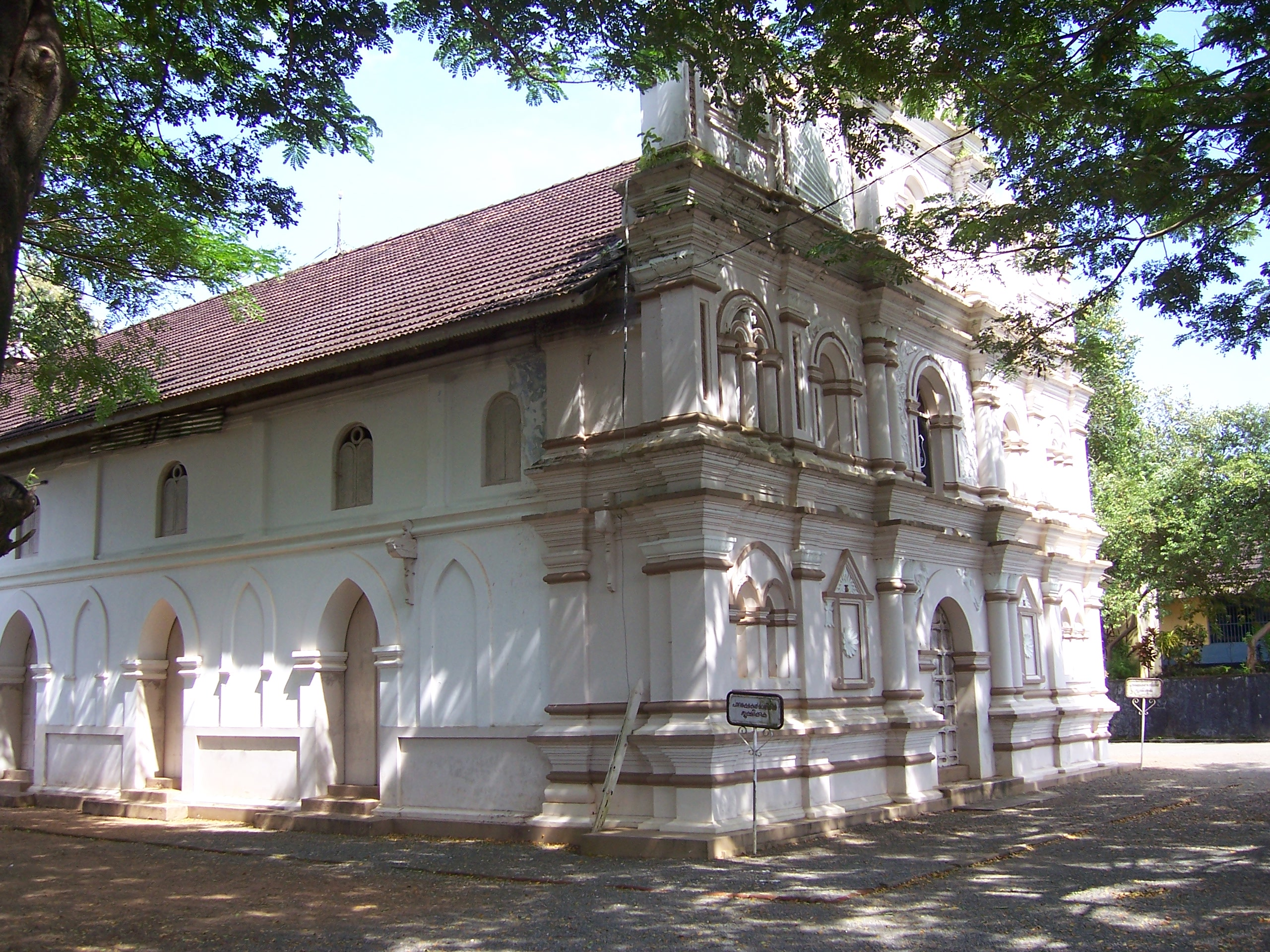
Marthoman Church Maramon (2005)

At the time of Purification, a number of reforms were made in church. A few of them are given below.

1. Translated and revised the liturgy thus removing practices that he deemed unscriptural.
2. Abolished prayers for the dead, invocation of saints, and veneration of sacraments.
3. Abolished auricular confession.
4. Introduced the practice of giving Holy Communion to the people in both kinds.
5. Emphasized the reading and study of the Bible, family-worship and evangelistic work.
6. Removed pictures and drawings and statues from the churches and places of worship.
7. Insisted on a good moral standard of conduct for the laity and simple living for the clergy with high morale.

On Monday 29 August 1836, the closing day of the 15 Day lent Abraham Malpan celebrated the Holy Qurbana Service in Malayalam directly translating from the Syriac Text at his home parish in Maramon. Clergy who supported him also followed it in various other parishes.

A yearly church festival was held on 5 October at Maramon in connection with the saint Eldho Mor Baselios. During the observance, a wooden image known as Muthappan—a term meaning “elder” used within the Nasrani tradition for bishops, in this context referring to the Maphrian Saint Eldho Mor Baselios—was carried in procession, and devotees offered prayers and offerings to it. In 1837, approximately 22 years after assuming charge of the parish, Abraham Malpan removed the image and disposed of it in a well, reportedly stating, “Why consult the dead on behalf of the living?” This act formed part of the broader liturgical reforms that subsequently removed prayers to saints and prayers for the dead from the reformed liturgy.

=== After-effects ===
The adoption of the revised liturgy and the associated reforms introduced by Abraham Malpan led to strong opposition from Dionysius IV of Cheppad, who threatened him with excommunication. In response, Malpan is reported to have stated that he would not seek reversal should such a measure be enacted. Dionysius IV did not proceed with excommunication or defrocking, and Malpan was permitted to retain his position as vicar. However, he was subsequently suspended from clerical duties. In addition, ordination was denied to deacons trained under Malpan, owing to concerns regarding his doctrinal and liturgical teachings.

Abraham Malpan continued to pursue his reform initiatives despite opposition. He returned to Maramon, where several of his students joined him to continue their studies, along with others who supported the proposed revitalisation of the Church. Members of various parishes, including Kozhencherry, Ayroor, Kumbanad, Koorthamala, Eraviperoor, Thumpamon, Elanthoor, Kundara, Kottarakara, Mavelikara, and Mallapally, travelled to Maramon to attend Malayalam-language services and hear his sermons. The reform movement also gained traction in other locations through clergy who aligned themselves with his views.

At this stage, Malpan is described as having faced three potential courses of action: to return to the established traditions, to join the Anglican Church and its theological framework, or to continue pursuing reform within the Malankara Church. He chose to proceed with the reform movement.

=== Mathews Mar Athanasius Metropolitan ===
Abraham Malpan's older brother Mathunni's son Mathen was closely associated with the reform movement from an early stage and was personally mentored as a deacon. After completing his studies at Kottayam, he pursued higher education at Madras Christian College, then established under Rev. John Anderson.

Following his collegiate education, and under the influence and guidance of Abraham Malpan, he made arrangements to travel to Antioch for episcopal consecration with assistance from his teachers in Madras. According to tradition, he expressed his commitment to his ecclesiastical mission to his friend Deacon George Mathen, later Rev. George Mathen, stating his dedication to the renewal of the Church and its restoration according to his reformist vision.

He was consecrated as bishop Mathews Mar Athanasius, in February 1842 at Antioch and served for a brief period before returning to Kerala in March 1843. In 1852, he was recognised as Malankara Metropolitan and continued to lead the Malankara Syrian Church until 1877.

During his tenure, Mathews Mar Athanasius ordained several deacons and priests, including individuals who later became prominent figures in the Church, such as St. Gregorios of Parumala. In 1868, he is also recorded to have ordained Abraham Malpan's son Thomas Mar Athanasius, who later represented his faction in ecclesiastical and legal proceedings related to disputes within the Malankara Church.

=== Later years and death ===
Abraham Malpan suffered from diabetes, for which effective treatment was not available during his lifetime. By the age of approximately 50, his health had deteriorated significantly, and he died on 9 September 1845. He was buried the following day at Maramon Church. His funeral service was conducted by his nephew, Mathews Mar Athanasius, who was then serving as Metropolitan of the Malankara Syrian Church.

== Legacy ==
Abraham Malpan is variously interpreted in historical accounts of Indian Christianity as a conservative reformer or, in some narratives, as a figure associated with ecclesiastical schism. Due to his relatively early death and the limited corpus of his direct writings, his precise theological and ecclesiastical vision remains a matter of historical interpretation.

He is generally described as a zealous and disciplined cleric who sought the renewal of the Syrian Church through critical engagement with its prevailing practices, with the intention of aligning them more closely with biblical principles. However, the extent and specific contours of the reforms he envisioned are debated among historians, partly due to the reliance on differing and sometimes partisan sources.

Despite these uncertainties, there is broad agreement that he was deeply committed to the reform of the Church and to what he perceived as a biblically grounded restoration of its practices. His role in the broader nineteenth-century reform movement is therefore often regarded as influential, continuing to shape later discussions on ecclesiastical renewal within the Malankara tradition.

His son, Thomas Mar Athanasius succeeded Mathews Athanasius, as the Metropolitan of the Malankara Mar Thoma Syrian Church from 1889 to 1893 and was succeeded by Abraham Malpan's younger son, Titus I Mar Thoma.
