= Thomas Athanasius =

Marthoma Metropolitan (1877-1893)

His Beatitude The Most Reverend Aboon Thomas Mar Athanasius Mar Thoma XIV Malankara Metropolitan (1877-1889), Mar Thoma Metropolitan (1889-1893)
- of the Apostolic Throne of St Thomas
- Church: Mar Thoma Syrian Church
- Installed: 16 July 1877
- Term ended: 10 August 1893
- Predecessor: Mathews Mar Athanasius
- Successor: Titus I Mar Thoma

Orders
- Ordination: 1 June, 1868
- Rank: Malankara Metropolitan (disputed, 1877-1889); Mar Thoma Metropolitan (1889-1893)

Personal details
- Parents: Abraham Malpan

Thomas Mar Athanasius Mar Thoma XIV (born P. A. Thomas; 7 October 1836 – 10 August 1893), also known as Thomas Thirumeni, served as the reformist claimant to the office of Malankara Metropolitan from 1877 to 1889, and subsequently as Metropolitan of the Mar Thoma Syrian Church from 1889 until his death in 1893. He was the eldest son of Abraham Malpan and belonged to the Palakunnathu family of Maramon.

He succeeded his cousin Mathews Mar Athanasius as the leader of the reformist faction during a prolonged dispute between the traditionalist and reformist groups within the Malankara Church, a conflict that lasted approximately 24 years. The dispute was resolved in 1889 through a verdict of the Travancore Royal Court, which recognised the traditionalist faction and resulted in his removal from office and eviction from the Pazhaya Seminary, regarded as the seat of the Malankara Metropolitan.

Following this judgment, the reformist community that remained loyal to him re-organised as an independent church body under its own episcopal governance, adopting the name Mar Thoma Syrian Church. Thomas Mar Athanasius continued to serve as its head until his death in 1893. The church maintains that it represents the autonomous continuation of the Malankara Syrian tradition, tracing its origins to the apostolic mission of St. Thomas the Apostle in the 1st century AD.

== Early life ==
P. A. Thomas was born as the first son of Aleyamma and Abraham Malpan of the Palakunnathu family of Maramon and his younger brother was Dethos who later became, Titus I Mar Thoma.

=== Palakunnathu family ===
In the 17th century, a member of the Panamkuzhy family, a branch of the Pakalomattom family, settled in Kozhencherry on the banks of the Pampa River. The family later relocated to Maramon, residing at Chackkalyil on the opposite bank of the river.

Mathen, the second son of Kuruvilla, moved to a nearby residence at Palakunnathu. He had six sons and one daughter. The daughter was married into the Pavoothikunnel family, while the first four sons established households at Themoottil, Neduvelil, Periyilel, and Punamadom respectively. The fifth son became a celibate hermit priest (Palakunnathu Thomas Malpan), and the youngest son, and Mathew (father of Abraham Malpan), continued to reside at the ancestral Palakunnathu family house, which still exists.

As members of the ancient Malankara Church, the Palakunnathu family produced several prominent ecclesiastical leaders. Notable figures from the family include his cousin Malankara Metropolitan Mathews Mar Athanasius and Marthoma Metropolitans such as Thomas' brother Titus I Mar Thoma and other relatives such as Titus II Mar Thoma, and Joseph Mar Thoma.

== Administration ==
=== Reformation in the Malankara Syrian Church ===
During the time of Mathews Mar Athanasius, there was a strong uprising in the church for renaissance and reformation inspired by Anglican missionaries and scriptural education; and strong opposition against it led by Pulikkottil Joseph Mar Dionysius II (Dionysius V).

Mathews Mar Athanasius consecrated Thomas Mar Athanasius, as his successor in 1869 in presence of Joseph Mar Koorilose IV, metropolitan of the Malabar Independent Syrian Church. Thomas continued the footsteps of his predecessor's reformation policy.

At the time, structured theological education for clergy was limited. Reports from the period also indicate irregularities in ecclesiastical administration, including the conduct of Holy Communion involving financial transactions in some instances. In several parishes, church properties were under the control of a small number of prominent families. Systems for maintaining formal accounts and auditing church income and records were either undeveloped or inconsistently applied.

Within this context, Thomas Mar Athanasius is credited with introducing a series of administrative and ecclesiastical reforms at both parish and church levels, continuing and expanding initiatives associated with his predecessors.

The Malankara Church maintains that it was not historically subject to any external ecclesiastical authority. However, in 1876, Dionysius V invited the Patriarch of Antioch to preside over a synod held at Mulanthuruthy. During this synod, the Patriarch reorganised the Church into seven dioceses and consecrated bishops for each diocese. Dionysius V was assigned responsibility for the Quilon diocese, strengthening his administrative and ecclesiastical authority within the traditional Syrian Church.

Mathews Mar Athanasius, along with his suffragan Thomas Mar Athanasius, and the churches aligned with the reformist faction, did not participate in the synod and did not accept its decisions.

Following the death of Mathews Mar Athanasius, leadership of the reformist faction passed to Thomas Mar Athanasius, who continued reform activities amid opposition. The resulting ecclesiastical disputes eventually led to legal proceedings concerning church authority and administration.

=== The Litigation "Seminary Suit" ===
The majority Orthodox (Jacobite) faction, led by Dionysius V, challenged the validity of the consecration of Thomas Mar Athanasius, arguing that it had been performed without the sanction of the Syriac Patriarch, who was regarded by them as the supreme ecclesiastical authority of the Syrian Church in Malabar.

This dispute led to prolonged litigation lasting approximately ten years, primarily concerning the ownership and control of the Syrian Seminary and associated church properties. The case culminated in the 1889 judgment of the Royal Court of Appeal of Travancore, in which the two native judges ruled in favour of Joseph Mar Dionysius as the legitimate representative of the Patriarchal faction. The English judge, Justice Ormsby, recorded a dissenting opinion.

Following this judgment, the reformist faction separated to form an independent ecclesiastical body. In 1893, it adopted the name Mar Thoma Syrian Church.

=== Malankara Mar Thoma Syrian Church ===
Following the loss of its temporal claims to church properties, the Mar Thoma Syrian community reorganised itself as an independent ecclesiastical body. The period also witnessed increased emphasis on evangelistic activity, reflected in the establishment of the Mar Thoma Evangelistic Association in 1888, and the launch of the church publication Malankara Sabha Tharaka in 1893.

Both factions—the reformist group, which developed into an independent Reformed Syrian church, and the traditionalist group, which remained within the Syriac Orthodox communion—continued to function and develop as separate ecclesiastical bodies.

=== Eviction from Malankara Syrian Church ===
Following the conclusion of the litigation, the majority judgment of the Royal Court in 1889 ruled against Thomas Mar Athanasius. As a consequence, he was legally removed from the Kottayam Seminary, which had functioned as the seat of the Malankara Metropolitan. The court’s decision was based on the position that his consecration had not been conducted with the approval of the Patriarch of Antioch.

During the proceedings, it is recorded that his episcopal insignia—including the mitre, cope, and crozier—were lost. In the period following the judgment, he is described as having led a more contemplative and prayerful life amid continuing difficulties, and he died shortly thereafter.

Although his episcopate was marked by institutional conflict and hardship, it is regarded within church tradition as having significant long-term spiritual influence. The Mar Thoma Syrian Church considers itself as continuing the early traditions of the Malabar Church, reformed in accordance with biblical teachings.

Mar Thoma Church Titles
Preceded by Palakkunnathu Mathews Mar Athanasius	XIV Mar Thoma Metropolitan of the Mar Thoma Syrian Church; 1877–1893	Succeeded by Titus I Mar Thoma
