= Titus I Mar Thoma =

Indian bishop (1843–1909)

His Beatitude The Most Reverend Aboon Titus I Mar Thoma XV Mar Thoma Metropolitan
- of the Apostolic Throne of St Thomas
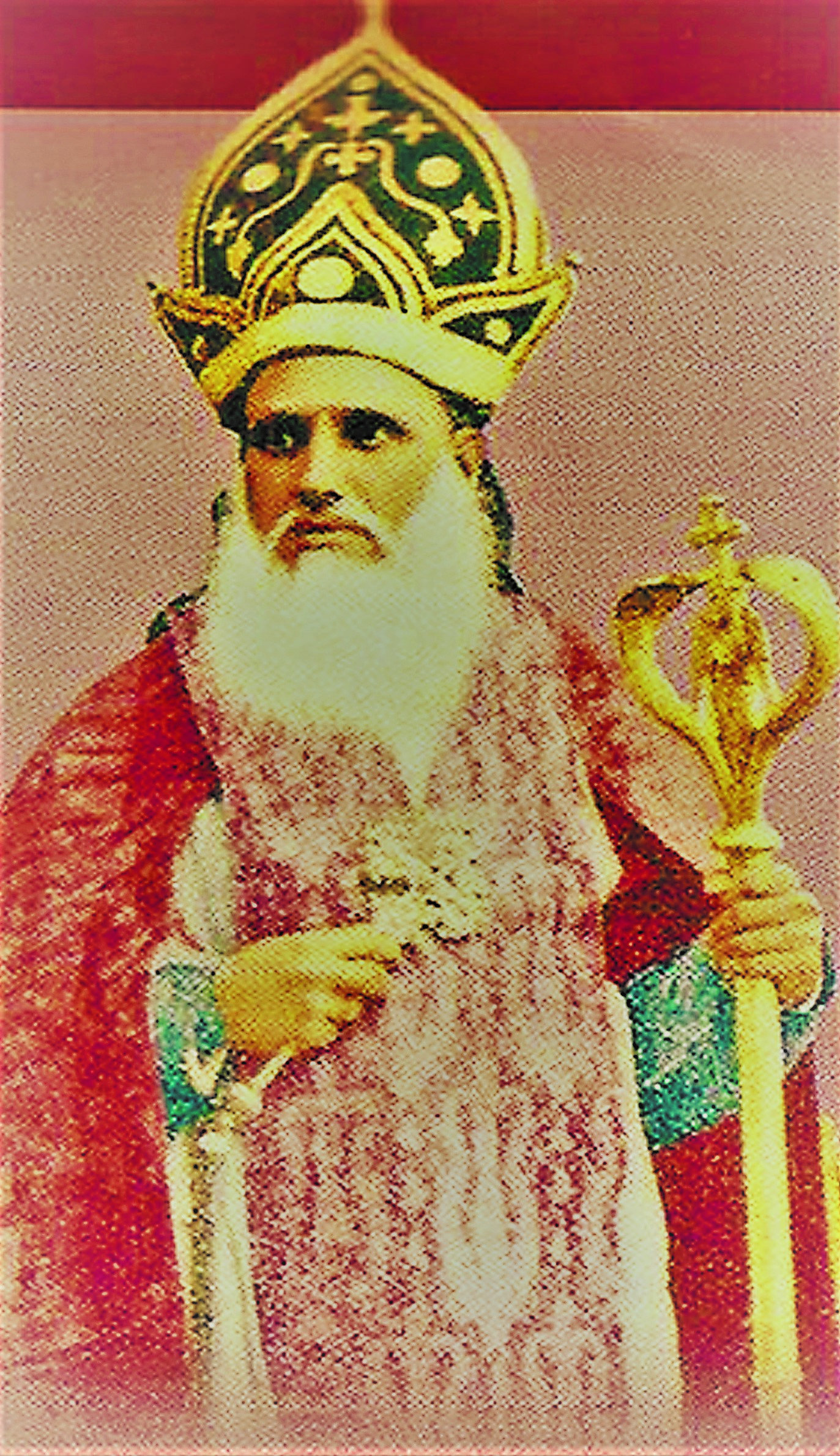
- Church: Mar Thoma Syrian Church
- Installed: 18 January 1894
- Term ended: 20 October 1909
- Predecessor: Thomas Mar Athanasius Metropolitan
- Successor: Titus II Mar Thoma

Orders
- Ordination: 1867
- Consecration: 9 December 1894
- Rank: Mar Thoma Metropolitan (Ecclesiastical Title of the Head of the Ancient Indian Church)

Personal details
- Born: P. A. Dethos; 20 February 1843 Maramon
- Died: 20 October 1909 (aged 66) Tiruvalla
- Buried: Tiruvalla
- Parents: Abraham Malpan

Titus I Mar Thoma XV (born P. A. Dethos; 20 February 1843 – 20 October 1909), also known as Thithos Mar Thoma Metropolitan, served as the second Metropolitan of the Mar Thoma Church from 1893 to 1909, following the ecclesiastical reorganisation of the reformist faction after the division of the Malankara Church. He was the youngest son of Abraham Malpan and belonged to the Palakunnathu family of Maramon.

Following the mid-19th century division within the Malankara Church, Titus I Mar Thoma succeeded his older brother, Thomas Mar Athanasius as the Metropolitan of the reformist faction, which later adopted the name Mar Thoma Syrian Church, commonly known as the Malankara Mar Thoma Syrian Church. The Church thereafter functioned as an independent ecclesiastical body under its own metropolitan leadership.

== Biography ==
=== Early life ===
P. A. Dethos was born on 20 February 1843, the youngest son of Abraham Malpan of the Palakunnathu family and Aleyamma of the Thondamvelil family. He was baptized by Mathews Mar Athanasius Metropolitan at the Maramon church. The name Dethos is Aramaic for Titus.

==== Palakunnathu family ====
In the 17th century, Kuruvilla of the Panamkuzhy family, a branch of the Pakalomattom family, settled in Kozhencherry on the banks of the Pampa River. The family later relocated to Maramon, residing at Chackkalyil on the opposite bank of the river.

Mathen, the second son of his Kuruvilla, moved to a nearby residence at Palakunnathu. He had six sons and one daughter. The daughter was married into the Pavoothikunnel family, while the first four sons established households at Themoottil, Neduvelil, Periyilel, and Punamadom respectively. The fifth son became a celibate hermit priest (Palakunnathu Thomas Malpan), and the youngest son, and Mathew (father of Abraham Malpan), continued to reside at the ancestral Palakunnathu family house, which still exists.

As members of the ancient Malankara Church, the Palakunnathu family produced several prominent ecclesiastical leaders. Notable figures from the family include his cousin Malankara Metropolitan Mathews Mar Athanasius and Marthoma Metropolitans such as Dethos' brother Thomas Mar Athanasius and other relatives such as Titus II Mar Thoma, and Joseph Mar Thoma.

=== Education and ordination ===
Following his primary education at Maramon, Dethos joined the Kottayam Seminary and later studied at C. M. S. College, Kottayam, before proceeding to Madras for higher education.

In 1867, he was ordained as a priest by Mathews Mar Athanasius at Maramon Church and was subsequently appointed assistant vicar of the parish. He was noted for his oratorical abilities.

During this period, a prayer meeting held at the residence of a parishioner later developed into what became known as the Maramon Convention.

=== Consecration and enthronement ===
Following the death of his older brother and metropolitan Thomas Mar Athanasius in August 1893, no successor had been consecrated, and most parish churches remained under the influence of the traditionalist faction. As a result, Dethos (then known as Dethos Kathanar), who had become the senior-most clerical figure within the reformist community, was proposed for episcopal consecration. He agreed to accept the position on the condition that it received the consent of all parish churches.

Once consensus was reached among parish representatives, it was decided that the consecration would take place at Cheriya Palli, Kottayam, where Thazhathu Punnathra Chandapilla Kathanar was serving as vicar. On 18 January 1894, Dethos Kathanar was consecrated by Joseph Mar Athanasius I, head of the Malabar Independent Syrian Church, along with Geevarghese Mar Koorilose V.

Following his consecration, he assumed the episcopal title Titus I Mar Thoma (also rendered Titus Mar Thoma Metropolitan).

== Administration ==
=== Reformation ===
==== Participation of laity ====
When Titus I Mar Thoma assumed leadership of the Church, key administrative decisions were initially handled by a clergy committee. In keeping with his emphasis on more representative governance, he introduced reforms aimed at incorporating broader participation in ecclesiastical administration. Following consultation with the clergy committee, two governing bodies were established: a Managing Committee (now known as the Sabha Council) and a Representative Assembly (now known as the Prathinidhi Mandalam).

These bodies included bishops as well as representatives of both clergy and laity from various parishes. The first Managing Committee comprised seven clergy members and five lay representatives. The inaugural meetings of these committees were held in 1896.

==== Other reforms ====
A formal constitution for the Church was drafted and subsequently approved by both the Prathinidhi Mandalam and the Sabha Council. A Vaideeka Selection Committee was also established to oversee the selection of qualified laypersons for ordination into the clergy.

Revisions were introduced to the Qurbana Thaksa (Holy Communion liturgy) in order to align it more closely with the theological principles of the reform movement. The term Qurbana is derived from Syriac and is cognate with the Hebrew word korban.

=== Educational institutions and missionary work ===
The establishment of educational institutions formed a key aspect of the Church’s activities during this period. The Kottayam Mar Thoma Seminary School was founded in 1896, followed by the Tiruvalla S.C. Seminary High School in 1902. These initiatives facilitated the subsequent establishment of several primary schools across different parishes.

The expansion of the Church’s educational network contributed to improvements in social and educational conditions in various villages and towns in Kerala. Missionary activities initially centred around Kottayam and later extended to North Travancore, with further expansion beyond Kerala by 1909.

In 1905, the Sunday School Samajam was also established to organise and coordinate religious education among children and youth.

=== Maramon Convention ===
The Mar Thoma Syrian Church also faced several internal challenges during this period. It has been noted that, due to the absence of a fully systematised doctrinal framework in its early post-reformation phase, certain theological influences from other denominations were perceived to have entered sections of the Church.

By 1894, small prayer groups had begun to emerge within various parishes as part of efforts toward spiritual renewal, contributing to a wider revival movement. These gatherings gradually became regular parish-level meetings. As attendance increased, the matter was brought before the episcopal leadership, and it was decided to organise a consolidated convention at a central and accessible location for the participating communities.

The responsibility for organising this event was entrusted to the Mar Thoma Evangelistic Association. The first such convention was held at Maramon in 1895, marking the origin of what later became known as the Maramon Convention.

== Parishes ==
The litigation which began in 1879 and ended in 1889 was only for the Malankara Church properties. But the parish properties belonged to the individual parishes. So each parish had to go again with separate litigation to possess their parish properties.

Parishes (church and their properties) that remained with the Marthoma church during the reformation: Elanthoor Valia palli, Kumbanad Valia Palli, Koorthamala Palli (Kareelamukku, Koipram), Kottarakara palli, Paryaram pazhya palli, Thalavady West.

After civil cases, the following churches and its properties were under Mar Thoma church but lost hold along time: Manarcaud palli, Puthencavu palli. Important churches that Mar Thoma won the earlier court cases, but lost in the final verdict: Arthat palli and St. George Orthodox Church, Puthuppally.

== Consecration of a successor ==
To assist Titus I Mar Thoma in the administration of the Church, the Representative Assembly convened at Mavelikara selected Rev. P. J. Dethos for episcopal consecration. He was the son of Mathews Mar Athanasius's brother, Palakunnathu Joseph.

Rev. P. J. Dethos was consecrated as a bishop on 9 December 1898 at Puthencavu Church by Titus I Mar Thoma, with the assistance of Geevarghese Mar Koorilose V of the Malabar Independent Syrian Church. Upon consecration, he received the episcopal title Titus II Mar Thoma (Thithoos Dwitheeyan Mar Thoma Metropolitan).

== Death ==
Metropolitan was suffering from diabetes for a long time. He died on 20 October 1909 and was entombed at Tiruvalla church. The funeral service was conducted by Titus II Mar Thoma in the presence of Vicar General Ipe Thoma Kathanar and a large crowd.

== See also ==
- Syrian Malabar Nasrani
- Saint Thomas Christians
- Christianity in India
- Malankara Metropolitan
- List of Syrian Malabar Nasranis
- Thomas Mar Athanasius
- Titus II Mar Thoma
- Throne of St. Thomas
- List of Malankara metropolitans

== Further References ==
  1. Juhanon Marthoma Metropolitan, The Most Rev. Dr. (1952). Christianity in India and a Brief History of the Marthoma Syrian Church. Pub: K.M. Cherian.
  2. Cherian Cherian. (1958). Maramon Pakalomattom Chackalyil Kudumba Charitram (Family History of Maramon Pakalomattom Chackalyil).
  3. Zac Varghese Dr. & Mathew A. Kallumpram. (2003). Glimpses of Mar Thoma Church History. London, England. ISBN 8190085441.
  4. Chacko, T. C. (1936) Malankara Marthoma Sabha Charithra Samgraham (Concise History of Marthoma Church), Pub: E.J. Institute, Kompady, Tiruvalla.
  5. Eapen, Prof. Dr. K.V. (2001). Malankara Marthoma Suryani Sabha Charitram (History of Malankara Marthoma Syrian Church). Pub: Kallettu, Muttambalam, Kottayam.
  6. Ittoop Writer, (1906). Malayalathulla Suryani Chistianikauleday Charitram (History of Syrian Christians in the land of Malayalam).
  7. Mathew, N. M. Malankara Marthoma Sabha Charitram (History of the Marthoma Church), Volume 1 (2006), Volume II (2007), Volume III (2008). Pub. E.J.Institute, Thiruvalla.
  8. Mathew, N. M. (2003). History of Palakunnathu Family. Pub: Palakunnathu Family committee.

Mar Thoma Church Titles
Preceded by Palakkunnathu Thomas Mar Athanasious	XV Mar Thoma Metropolitan of the Mar Thoma Syrian Church; 1893–1909	Succeeded by Titus II Mar Thoma
