= Joseph Mar Thoma =

Indian bishop

His Beatitude Joseph Mar Thoma XXI
- Mar Thoma Metropolitan and Primate of the Apostolic See of St.Thomas
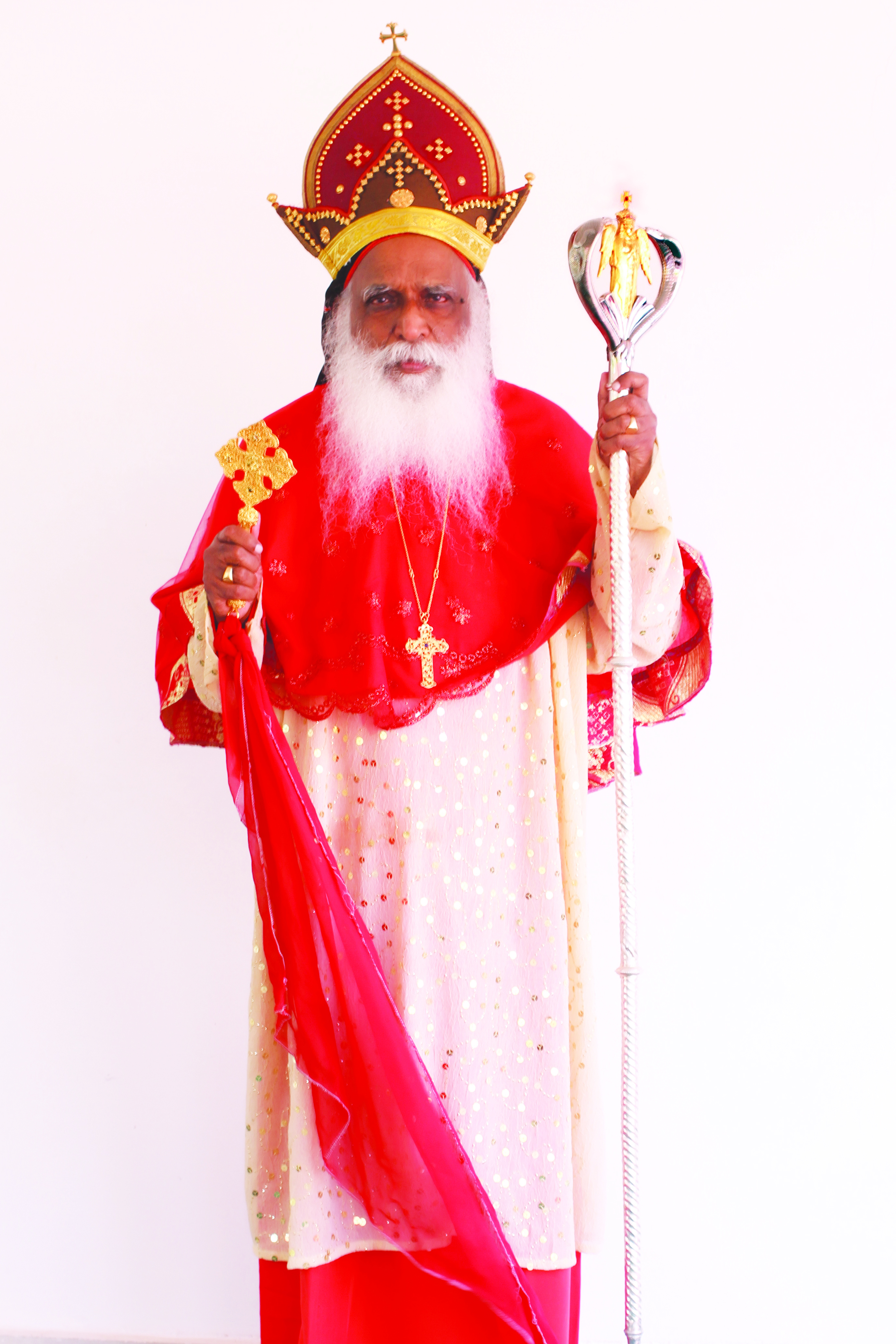
- Church: Malankara Mar Thoma Syrian Church
- Installed: 2 October 2007
- Term ended: 18 October 2020
- Predecessor: Philipose Mar Chrysostom Mar Thoma
- Successor: Theodosius Mar Thoma

Orders
- Ordination: 18 October 1957
- Consecration: 8 February 1975
- Rank: Mar Thoma Metropolitan (Ecclesiastical Title of the Head of the Ancient Indian Church)

Personal details
- Born: P. T. Joseph; 27 June 1931 Maramon, Pathanamthitta, Travancore, British Raj
- Died: 18 October 2020 (aged 89) Thiruvalla, Kerala
- Buried: Syrian Christian Seminary, Thiruvalla

Joseph Mar Thoma XXI (born P. T. Joseph; 27 June 1931 - 18 October 2020) was the 21st Mar Thoma Metropolitan and the church's primate.

== Early life and education ==
P. T. Joseph was born on 27 June 1931, as the son of Mariamma and P. T. Lukose of Palakunnathu Kadon family of Maramon.

After his education at Maramon and Kozhencherry, he joined Union Christian College, Aluva where he played for the college basketball team.

=== Palakunnathu family ===
In the 17th century, Kuruvilla of the Panamkuzhy family, a branch of the Pakalomattom family, settled in Kozhencherry on the banks of the Pampa River. The family later relocated to Maramon, residing at Chackkalyil on the opposite bank of the river.

Mathen, the second son of his Kuruvilla, moved to a nearby residence at Palakunnathu. He had six sons and one daughter. The daughter was married into the Pavoothikunnel family, while the first four sons established households at Themoottil, Neduvelil, Periyilel, and Punamadom respectively. The fifth son became a celibate hermit priest (Palakunnathu Thomas Malpan), and the youngest son, and Mathew, continued to reside at the ancestral Palakunnathu family house, which still exists.

As members of the ancient Malankara Church, the Palakunnathu family produced several prominent ecclesiastical leaders. Notable figures from the family include Abraham Malpan and Malankara Metropolitan Mathews Mar Athanasius and previous Marthoma Metropolitans such as Thomas Mar Athanasius, Titus I Mar Thomas and Titus II Mar Thoma.

== Ordination ==
Joseph had intended to take up an academic career, but when he was called to take up theological studies, he accepted it and in 1954, he joined the United Theological College, Bangalore, Karnataka, India, where he obtained a Bachelor of Divinity degree.

He was ordained as deacon of the Mar Thoma Church on 29 June 1957, and kasseessa (priest) on 18 October 1957. He then went on to study at the Protestant Episcopal Seminary in Virginia, USA. From there, he went to Canterbury and Oxford in England and obtained Master of Divinity (M.Div.) and Master of Sacred Theology (STM) degrees. He was later awarded an honorary Doctor of Divinity degree by the Virginia Seminary, where he studied.

== Consecration ==
Realizing the need for more bishops for the Malankara Mar Thoma Syrian Church, the Church Mandalam (representative assembly) in 1974, decided to consecrate two more bishops. Rev. P. T. Joseph was one of those who were selected. He was ordained as Ramban on 11 January 1975.

=== Episcopa ===
On 8 February 1975, Juhanon Mar Thoma, Metropolitan, assisted by the other bishops of the church ordained the Rev. Joseph and gave him the episcopal title of Joseph Mar Irenaeus. Rev. V. T. Koshy was also ordained as Easow Mar Timotheos on the same day.

=== Suffragan metropolitan ===
On 15 March 1999, he was designated as suffragan metropolitan when Philipose Mar Chrysostom, the suffragan metropolitan, was designated as the officiating metropolitan.

== Metropolitan ==
=== Malankara throne ===
Malankara Throne

After the swearing-in of 1653 it became necessary to appoint a bishop. For this purpose, a special chair was made and Mar Thoma I was enthroned as the first bishop of Malankara Church. This throne is in the possession of the Mar Thoma Church and is kept at Tiruvalla. It has been used in the installation of every Mar Thoma metropolitan to this day so that the continuity of the bishopric of Mar Thoma is ensured. This was the throne used for the consecration of Mar Thoma XXI, Joseph Mar Thoma Metropolitan.

=== Enthronement ===
Joseph Mar Irenaeus was installed as Mar Thoma XXI Metropolitan on 2 October 2007 when the 20th Mar Thoma, Philipose Mar Chrysostom expressed his desire to transfer responsibilities of the church to his successor due to old age and deteriorating health. He continued as 'Valiya Metropolitan' or Metropolitan Emeritus.

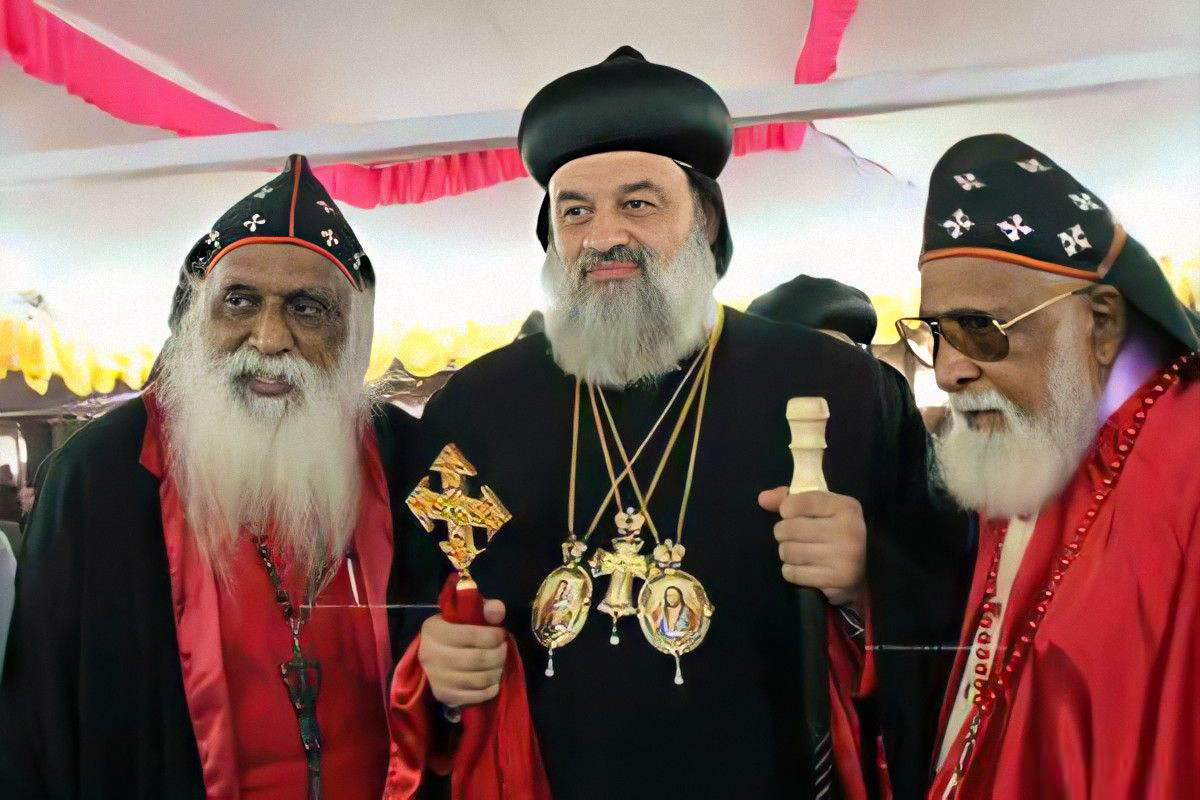
Most. Revd. Dr. Joseph Mar Thoma and Dr. Philipose Mar Chrysostom with Moran Mor Ignatius Aphrem II

== Contributions ==
He was the President of the National Council of Churches in India, Senior President of CCA, and the chairman of CASA.

He served as Vicar of Ranni, Kozhikode, Kundara, Madras and Thiruvananthapuram Parishes. He also served as travelling secretary of the Mar Thoma Evangelistic Association for several years.

His activities included sanctions of building many socio-spiritual centers with monuments, including Tharangam Mission Action Centre, which can also be used as the secondary venue for diocese activities that were previously held adjacent to the spacious building near the Bishop House.

He introduced music and new styles of worship to target the younger generation (via the DSMC studio, blogs, and camps).

Joseph Mar Thoma advocated protecting the environment. He has warned that atrocities to nature are suicidal and has urged people to take remedial measures by adopting responsible green conservatism. He also personally campaigned for the protection of Pampa River on whose bed the Maramon Convention is hosted.

He started the Navajeevan organisation for the children in the streets of Mumbai. He lifted the ban on woman during the night time at the Maramon convention. He also invited members of the transgender community to deliver talks at the convention.

On his 80th birthday in 2011, the Church inaugurated 'Snehakaram', a project for critically ill patients with cancer, kidney and heart disorders.

== Ordination dates ==
Ordained as deacon: 29 June 1957
Ordained as kasseessa: 18 October 1957
Ordained as ramban: 11 January 1975
Consecrated as episcopa: 8 February 1975
Designated as suffragan metropolitan: 15 March 1999
Installed as metropolitan: 2 October 2007

== Death ==
Joseph Mar Thoma died on 18 October 2020 at 2:38 AM as a result of pancreatic cancer.

== See also ==
- Throne of St. Thomas
- Syrian Malabar Nasrani
- Saint Thomas Christians
- Christianity in India
- List of Syrian Malabar Nasranis

Mar Thoma Church Titles
Preceded by Philipose Mar Chrysostom Mar Thoma	XXI Mar Thoma Metropolitan of the Malankara Mar Thoma Syrian Church; 2007-2020	Succeeded by Theodosius Mar Thoma
