= Mathews Athanasius =

Indian religious leader (1818–1877)

His Grace The Most Reverend Aboon Mathews Mar Athanasius Mar Thoma XIII Malankara Metropolitan
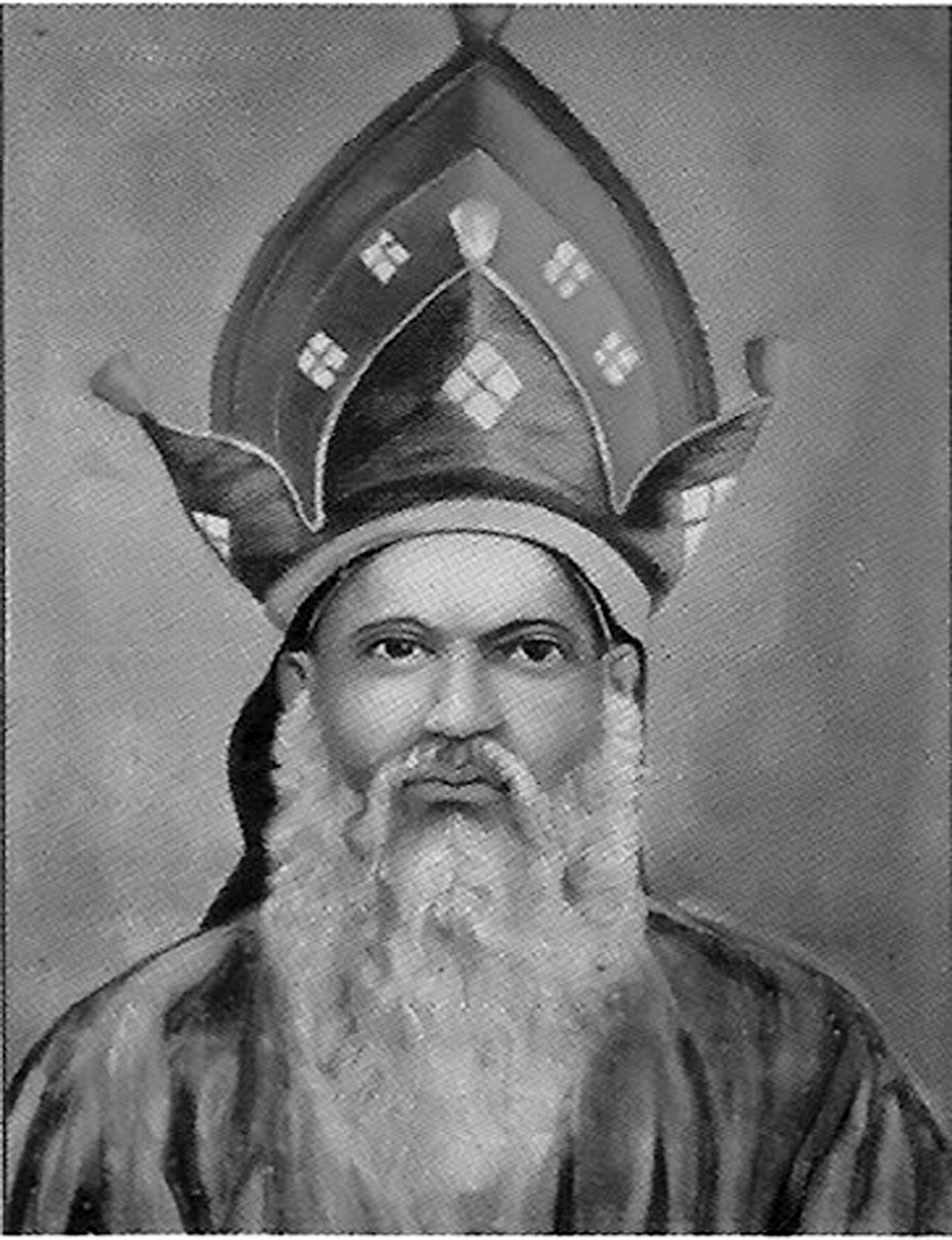
- Church: Malankara Church (Puthenkoor) (1831-1865); Malankara Church (Reformist faction) (1865-1877)
- Installed: 1852
- Term ended: 1877
- Predecessor: Dionysius IV
- Successor: Dionysious V (1865, Traditionalist faction); Thomas Mar Athanasius (1877, Reformist faction)

Orders
- Ordination: 1831
- Consecration: February 1842
- Rank: Malankara Metropolitan (undisputed 1831-1865, disputed with Dionysious V 1865-1877)

Personal details
- Born: Mathen; 25 April 1818 Maramon
- Died: 16 July 1877 (aged 59) Maramon
- Buried: Maramon church

Mathews Mar Athanasius Mar Thoma XIII (born Mathen; 25 April 1818 – 16 July 1877) was the undisputed Malankara Metropolitan of the Malankara Church from 1852 until 1865, and the Reformist claimant to the Metropolitanate from 1865 until his death in 1877. As a reformist, he spent most of his reign attempting to reform and heal rifts within the church. However, in 1865, he was deposed by the traditionalist faction of the Malankara Church and Pulikkottil Joseph Dionysius became their leader.

Mathews started his career in the church in childhood, and was influenced by the Church Mission Society and his uncle Abraham Malpan, a priest who instituted reforms in Maramon parish in 1840. When Abraham's reforms led to conflict with the reigning Malankara Metropolitan Dionysius IV, Deacon Mathews traveled to the Syriac Orthodox Patriarch, who consecrated him as Bishop Mathews Athanasius in 1841. After years of dispute over the church's leadership between Mathews and Dionysius, the issue was settled by the Travancore government in 1852, with Mathews being recognized as Metropolitan since he got the Royal decree from the Maharaja of Travancore. He worked to repair the rift in the church, but continuing unrest ultimately led to a permanent split. After the Synod of Mulanthurathy and the death of Athanasius, the rift in Malankara Church became more visible. Following the Royal Court Verdict against Metropolitan Thomas Athanasius and the reform party, the independent Malankara Mar Thoma Syrian Church was formed in 1889 as the Independent Malankara Syrian Church.

== Biography ==
=== Early life ===
Mathews Mar Athanasius was born as Mathen on 25 April 1818, the eldest son of Mariamma and Mathew "Mathunni" of the Palakunnathu family. He was baptised 90 days after his birth at Maramon Church.

==== Palakunnathu family ====
In the 17th century, Kuruvilla, a member of the Panamkuzhy family, a branch of the Pakalomattom family, settled in Kozhencherry on the banks of the Pampa River. The family later relocated to Maramon, residing at Chackkalyil on the opposite bank of the river.

Mathen, (not Mathews Mar Athanasius) the second son of Kuruvilla, moved to a nearby residence at Palakunnathu. He had six sons and one daughter. The daughter was married into the Pavoothikunnel family, while the first four sons established households at Themoottil, Neduvelil, Periyilel, and Punamadom respectively. The fifth son became a celibate hermit priest (Palakunnathu Thomas Malpan), and the youngest son, and Mathew (father of Mathunni), continued to reside at the ancestral Palakunnathu family house, which still exists.

As members of the ancient Malankara Church, the Palakunnathu family produced several prominent ecclesiastical leaders. Notable figures from the family include Mar Athanasius's father's brother Abraham Malpan and his sons Thomas Mar Athanasius and Titus I Mar Thoma.

Mar Athanasius's nephew Titus II Mar Thoma, and relative Joseph Mar Thoma, among others.

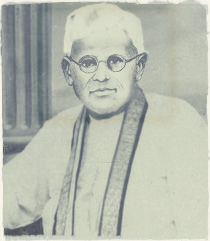
Chekottassan

=== Education ===
His early education was undertaken at Maramon under the guidance of the poet-laureate Chekottassan. At the age of eleven, he enrolled at the Syrian Seminary in Kottayam. At thirteen, he was ordained as a deacon by Dionysius IV of Cheppad, and became Deacon Mathen.

Following his initial education in Kerala, Deacon Mathen joined Rev. John Anderson’s School in Madras (present-day Madras Christian College). His friend, Deacon George Mathen, also studied there alongside him. By 1839, both had completed their studies in Madras and subsequently returned to Kerala.

=== Future plan ===
At the time, the Malankara Church was experiencing a period of internal disorder and institutional instability, and was at times described as being in a deplorable condition.

Prior to their departure from Madras, Deacon Mathen and Deacon George Mathen frequently discussed their future prospects. Both, having received theological training and clerical status as deacons, expressed concern regarding the state of the Malankara Church. Deacon George Mathen is reported to have concluded that restoration of the Church was not feasible and subsequently chose to join the Anglican C.M.S. Church.

Deacon Mathen, however, remained committed to his family tradition and to the reformist legacy associated with his uncle Abraham Malpan. According to tradition, he expressed his resolve to continue working within the Malankara Church, and said said, "As long as I am alive, I shall work only in my mother Church (Malankara Church) and will live to pull out the weeds in my Church and bring it back to its original glory of pure undiluted faith".

=== Beginning of reformation ===
By this time, Abraham Malpan had already begun reformation in the church and made the following changes:

- On Sunday 27 August 1837, Qurbana (Holy Communion) was conducted in Malayalam, the language of the people.
- A yearly church festival was held on 5 October at Maramon in connection with the saint Eldho Mor Baselios. During the observance, a wooden image known as Muthappan—a term meaning “elder” used within the Nasrani tradition for bishops, in this context referring to the Maphrian Saint Eldho Mor Baselios—was carried in procession, and devotees offered prayers and offerings to it. In 1837, approximately 22 years after assuming charge of the parish, Abraham Malpan removed the image and disposed of it in a well, reportedly stating, “Why consult the dead on behalf of the living?” This act formed part of the broader liturgical reforms that subsequently removed prayers to saints and prayers for the dead from the reformed liturgy.
- Changes were made to certain prayers in the prayer books, incorporating reformation theologies and insights received through the study of the Holy Bible.

The adoption of the revised liturgy and the associated reforms introduced by Abraham Malpan led to strong opposition from Dionysius IV of Cheppad, who threatened him with excommunication. In response, Malpan is reported to have stated that he would not seek reversal should such a measure be enacted. Dionysius IV did not proceed with excommunication or defrocking, and Malpan was permitted to retain his position as vicar. However, he was subsequently suspended from clerical duties. In addition, ordination was denied to deacons trained under Malpan, owing to concerns regarding his doctrinal and liturgical teachings.

=== Decision to go to Antioch ===
The synod convened at Mavelikkara on 16 January 1836 under the leadership of Dionysius IV affirmed the supremacy of the Syriac Orthodox Patriarch of Antioch and declared that only bishops duly authorized by the Patriarch held legitimate authority over the Church.

These developments influenced Deacon Mathen and reinforced his conviction that he should seek direct engagement with the Patriarchal authority in Antioch. In the context of growing reformist activity associated with Abraham Malpan, preparations were made for correspondence and travel connected with this objective.

As travel from Kerala to Antioch was uncommon at the time, no prior attempt from within the Malankara Church to undertake such a journey is recorded. Deacon Mathen is regarded as the first individual from the community to attempt this journey, and he received assistance from British Anglican contacts in Madras in facilitating the travel arrangements.

=== Metropolitan ===
Deacon Mathen was ordained on 17 February 1842 at Mardin by Moran Mor Elias II, receiving the episcopal title of Mathews Athanasius Metropolitan. He was subsequently appointed Metropolitan of Mosul and placed in charge of the diocese.

Following his consecration, he continued his ecclesiastical activities in accordance with Syriac Orthodox traditions and maintained his association with the broader Orthodox communion in practice.

=== Return to Kerala ===
Mathews Mar Athanasius returned to Kerala on 17 May 1843, where he was received by several parish priests and lay members of the Church. While at Cochin, he was visited by his teacher, Konattu Varghese Malpan, who arrived with his followers and advised him regarding the ecclesiastical situation in Malankara.

According to this account, Varghese Malpan observed that the clergy and laity of the Malankara Church would accept Mar Athanasius as Metropolitan, but cautioned that the introduction of reforms would not be readily accepted by the wider community. This assessment led the Metropolitan to recognize the practical difficulties associated with implementing extensive reforms.

=== Reformation ===
The Malankara Church traditionally traces its origins to the evangelistic activity attributed to apostles, St. Thomas and St. Bartholomew. It preserved early Syriac Christian traditions, including the use of the Peshitta Bible and liturgical practices associated with the East Syriac tradition, which is linked in ecclesiastical tradition to figures such as St. Addai and St. Mari. These traditions have historically included practices such as prayers for the dead, veneration of icons, belief in the sacraments, and affirmation of the real presence of Christ in the Eucharist.

The arrival of the Portuguese explorer Vasco da Gama in 1498 marked the beginning of increased Roman Catholic influence on the Malankara Church. This interaction introduced changes in ecclesiastical practice and administration, leading to tensions and subsequent divisions within the St. Thomas Christian community over the following centuries.

By the nineteenth century, reformist movements emerged within the Church, seeking a return to what they perceived as its earlier biblical and liturgical foundations. Among the prominent leaders of this movement was Abraham Malpan, whose efforts, along with those of his associates, contributed to the broader reform process that sought to revise liturgical practices and restore what was understood as a more original form of worship based on scriptural principles.

In 1856 inspired by the Anglican missionaries cooperated in the Old Syrian Seminary at Kottayam, Mar Athanasius printed and distributed prayer books in Malayalam, leaving out a prayer to Saint Mary.

Holy Communion services were conducted in Malayalam the language of the people of Malabar, abandoning Syriac Aramaic the language of the Peshitta, and the linguistic link that both West Syriac and East Syriac churches had to the Aramaic speaking Jesus Christ.

While with the Patriarch at Antioch, he was asked to preach at worship services. He continued this new practice after coming to Kerala. He encouraged clergy to read the Bible and interpret it to the common people of parishes. Mar Athanasius also allowed Tamil missionaries to preach at various churches and as he was against honoring icons and statues, Mar Athanasius removed the statue of Saint Mary from Manarcaud Church (near Kottayam), and at Puthupally church, near Kottayam.

Mathews Mar Athanasius was also active in social reform initiatives. He contributed to efforts aimed at improving educational and social conditions within the community. At the time, several schools were operated under the auspices of the Malankara Church. He is recorded as having advised the government to extend financial assistance to these institutions as a means of encouragement and support. The proposal was accepted, and governmental grants were subsequently provided to more than sixty schools affiliated with the Church.

=== Oppositions ===
Despite Mar Athansius return as a Metropolitan, there were objections from among the Malankara Church. They later wrote to Antioch their objections, and as a result, the Patriarch realizing that Mathews Mar Athanasius had hidden his intentions to conduct an Anglican modeled reformation from him, so the patriarch sent Euyakim Coorilos Metropolitan to Kerala, and from then on the Syriac Orthodox Church of Antioch introduced the "registered deed of submission" as an element of consecration as a metropolitan bishop.

=== Royal proclamation ===
In 1852, the declining health of Dionysius IV of Cheppad led to his abdication. The question of ecclesiastical leadership was also linked to the administration of the Vattipanam, a perpetual investment of 3,000 star pagodas made during the period of Thoma VII through Colin Macaulay on behalf of the East India Company for the support of church activities.

As the interest on this deposit was payable to the recognised head of the Malankara Church, the identity of the legitimate Metropolitan became a matter of administrative importance. In this context, Mathews Mar Athanasius was recognised by the governments of Travancore and Cochin as Malankara Metropolitan on 30 August 1852, following the abdication of Dionysius IV.

Athanasius went to Cheppad made arrangements to take care Dionysius IV and visited the parishes nearby till Dionysius died on 9 October 1855. The funeral service was conducted by Athanasius.

Consequently, he was able to receive the accumulated interest on the Vattipanam for the preceding 45 years from the government. This development was met with dissatisfaction by sections of the Church community.

=== Consecration at Thozhyoor ===
In 1856, Mar Athanasius ordained Joseph Mar Koorilose IV as Metropolitan of Malabar Independent Syrian Church.

=== Parish visits and publications ===
Mathews Mar Athanasius regularly visited parishes, residing for short periods in each location and engaging directly with parishioners. During these visits, he appointed officers to oversee the administration of church finances with greater efficiency, a measure that met some opposition within the church.

He also established a printing press at Kottayam for the use of the Church, through which liturgical texts were printed and distributed. The published liturgy omitted certain prayers, including those addressed to Saint Mary and other saints. This revision provoked opposition among sections of the priesthood. In response, opponents produced an alternative liturgical text that retained the omitted prayers.

=== Arrival of Patriarch ===
During this period, reform activities within the Malankara Church gained increased momentum. Ouseph Kathanar of Kunnamkulam, who opposed the reforms, travelled to Antioch and was consecrated on 3 April 1865 as Joseph Dionysius.

Following his return, opponents of Mathews Mar Athanasius extended their support to the Patriarch of Antioch and sought his intervention in the affairs of the Church. The reformist group, however, constituted a minority within the wider Malankara community, while the majority were aligned with the conservative faction. Consequently, a substantial portion of the community came under the influence of the Patriarch of Antioch.

Ignatius Peter IV, Patriarch of Antioch arrived in June 1875 at Kunnamkulam. On his way, he visited Istanbul, London, and Madras. By this time, those who opposed Mathews Mar Athanasius had a rumor flying among them that Athanasius would be laicized or excommunicated, without realizing that this was not possible. There are no records discovered yet to show that Mathews Athanasius was ever excommunicated. Although there have been rumors that Abraham Malpan and Mathews Athanasius weren't in agreement on reformation, Malpan sought for restoration through puritanism based on Anglican-Protestantism, while Mathews Athanasius sought for separation and autonomy.

== Ordinations ==
Athanasius ordained

- Abraham Malpan's son Palakkunathu Thomas, under the name Thomas Athanasius as his successor on 1 June 1868.
- Aarthatt Alathoor Ouseph Kathanar under the name Joseph Mar Koorilose IV of Malabar Independent Syrian Church in 1856.
- Geevarghese of Pallathetta Chathuruthy family at Mulanthuruthy was ordained as Korooyo (sub-deacon) on 14 September 1858, at Karingachira (was reordained in 1864). Later he became Gheevarghese Gregorios of Parumala, he died on 2 November 1902 and was laid to rest at Parumala Church. Later he became a canonized saint of the Malankara Church and is also known in Malayalam as Parumala Thirumeni.

== Death and Succession ==
Metropolitan died on 16 July 1877 after being bitten by a rat, and was laid to rest at Maramon church.

The reformist faction was led by Thomas Athanasius. Mathews Mar Athanasius remained as the head of this faction until his death in 1877.

The traditionalist party sent Fr.Joseph (Ouseph Kathanar) of Pulikkottil family to Antioch. He was the nephew of Pulikkottil Joseph Mar Dionysious I (Mar Dionysius II). He was consecrated as Joseph Mar Dionysius II (Mar Dionysius V) by Patriarch of Antioch Ignatius Jacob II on 7 May 1865.

After reaching Malankara, Mar Dionysius V had requested to the Government of Travancore, for revoking the Royal Proclamation, issued earlier in favour of Mathews Mar Athanasius. Soon after the demise of Mathews Athanasius Metropolitan the Malankara Church was involved in litigation for the properties of the Church in Kerala between the two factions of the church, culminating in the Royal court verdict of 12 July 1889, which was in favor of the traditionalist faction.

Mar Thoma Church Titles
Preceded by Cheppad Philipose Dionysius IV	XIII Mar Thoma Metropolitan of the Mar Thoma Syrian Church; 1842–1877	Succeeded by Thomas Athanasius

Malankara Church Titles
Preceded by Mar Dionysius IV	Malankara Metropolitan of the Malankara Syrian Church; 1842–1865	Succeeded by Pulikkottil Joseph Dionysious V
