= Geevarghese Philoxenos II =

His Grace Geevarghese Mar Philoxenos II Malankara Metropolitan and Thozhiyoor Metropolitan
- 11th Malankara Metropolitan and 5th Metropolitan of Thozhiyoor
- Native name: Kidangan Geevarghese
- Church: Malabar Independent Syrian Church
- Installed: 1812
- Term ended: 1829
- Predecessor: Mar Dionysius II; Sacharias Mar Philoxenos I
- Successor: Mar Dionysius III (interim 1816-1817); Mar Dionysius IV; Mar Koorilose III

Orders
- Consecration: 1812 by Sacharias Mar Philoxenos I

Personal details
- Died: 7 February 1829

Geevarghese Mar Philoxenos II (born Kidangan Geevarghese; died 1829) was the Metropolitan of the Malabar Independent Syrian Church (Thozhiyur Church) from 1811 to 1829, and the 11th Malankara Metropolitan.

== Early life and priesthood ==
Geevarghese was from the Kidangan family of Kunnamkulam.

He served as vicar of the Arthat Church (Chattukulangara) in the Malankara Church.

In 1812, he was consecrated as a bishop with the title Philoxenos by Sacharias Mar Philoxenos I.

== As Malankara Metropolitan ==
In 1816, during the time of Mar Thoma IX, amid disputes in the Malankara Church, Mar Philoxenos II consecrated Pulikkottil Ittoop Ramban as Mar Dionysius II at Pazhanji Church.

Following the death of Mar Dionysius II in 1816, contemporary missionary records refer to a bishop considered for leadership in the Malankara Church.

Thomas Norton, a missionary of the Church Missionary Society, wrote:

You will regret to hear, that the good old Metropolitan is dead. He died on Sunday, the 24th of November. I trust he has exchanged an earthly for a heavenly crown. He had been very ill for a long time; but was, to all appearance, recovering: his death, therefore, was rather sudden.

You will naturally be anxious to know who is to be his successor. The Resident, I am happy to say, has been most active on the occasion. He has been looking out for a man of true piety, as well as of talents, for that important office; and such an one, I hope, he has found. He is a Bishop, but has at present no jurisdiction: he has for some time lived a retired life, near Calicut.

The Syrians speak of him as such. Nearly all the Casanars are well affected toward him, and wish to have him over them. I have seen several of them, and they all speak of him in the highest terms. One of them, a man of much prayer, told me, 'He is a man of much prayer, and fears God.' From what I have heard, I should think him worthy of the station. He is very reluctant to leave his retired life, to which he had for some time devoted himself; and has written to the Resident to that effect: but I hope he will be persuaded to accept the office, for the real good of his Church.

If he should be the man, I shall expect great things. My heart is quite encouraged. I cannot but think that God is about to effect a change in the state of these people, by bringing in a man, as their leader and ruler, whom he will endow with much of His Spirit.

— Thomas Norton, CMS Missionary, The Missionary Register for 1818, p. 103.

Following deliberations at a synod, a royal proclamation dated 26 December 1816 (26 Dhanu 992 M.E.) confirmed his position as Malankara Metropolitan.

In 1817, Mar Philoxenos II consecrated Punnathra Geevarghese as Mar Dionysius III at the Kottayam Old Seminary.

In 1825, Mar Philoxenos II consecrated Cheppad Philipose Malpan as Mar Dionysius IV at the Kottayam Old Seminary on 27 August 1825.

== Conflict with Mar Athanasios ==
In 1825, Mar Athanasios Abdul Messih, associated with the Syriac Orthodox Patriarch of Antioch, arrived in Malankara and opposed the authority of local bishops.

Contemporary and later accounts record disputes between Athanasios and the existing church leadership.

British authorities later intervened in the situation, and Athanasios was deported.

== Later life and death ==
Mar Philoxenos II died on 7 February 1829 (27 Makaram 1004 M.E.).

He was buried at the Thozhiyur Church (St. George's Cathedral).

== See also ==
- Malabar Independent Syrian Church
- Malankara Orthodox Syrian Church
