= St. George Orthodox Church, Cheppad =

Church building in Kerala, India

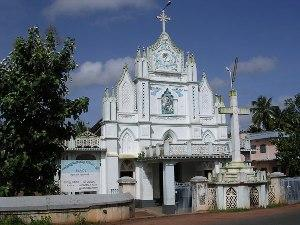
St George Orthodox Church, Cheppad

St. George Orthodox Church, Cheppad, Haripad in Kerala state of India, is popularly known as Cheppad Valiya Pally and is a pilgrim center of Malankara Orthodox Church. The church is also the resting place of Cheppad Philipose Mar Dionysius, Malankara Metropolitan of the Malankara Orthodox Syrian Church who lived in the mid 19th century. The 800 year-old murals in the Church exhibit Christian traditional paintings.

== History ==
It is believed that the church may have been founded in 1175.

The church is an important attraction of Cheppad. The Christian community is the second-largest religious community at Cheppad and many denominations of the Christian faith live there. The church is one of the oldest churches of the Malankara Orthodox Church, which is an apostolic church established by St. Thomas, one of the twelve apostles of Jesus Christ. There is evidence that one of the churches visited by Archbishop Menasis, in 1599 was Cheppad's St George Orthodox Church (Valiyapally). This church was the headquarters of the Malankara Orthodox Church during the tenure of Cheppad Philipose Mar Dionysius, Malankara Metropolitan of the Malankara Orthodox Church during 1825–1855 In 1956, the Ethiopian Emperor, Haile Selassie visited this church. It is believed that the Ethiopian Kings held a bloodline to King Solomon. Haile Selassie gifted the church a couple of gold artifacts, which were recently stolen from the church and have not been recovered. These included a gold crucifix from Ethiopia and a Bible with gold engraving in Amharic (a Semitic language spoken in North Central Ethiopia by the Amhara).

== Mural paintings ==
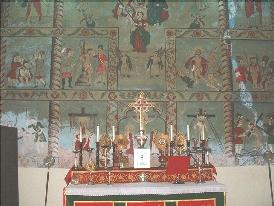
Old murals in the church

The 800-year-old mural paintings in Cheppad St. George Orthodox Church exhibit Christian traditional paintings. The paintings are on the walls of the Madbaha (altar) of the Church, and show the events in the life of Jesus Christ from birth to ascension. It also illustrates some events from the Old Testament era. The 47 murals are arranged in three lines along three walls. The archaeological department of Kerala says that the murals are approximately 600 years old and were drawn with the extracts of leaves and fruit.

Even though the old church was rebuilt in 1952, the altar was kept intact because of the Murals. The paintings of St. Paul with a sword, Angels, Jesus bearing the Cross, Jesus being beaten by soldiers, St. Thomas with a mint, Adam and Eve eating the prohibited fruit, Noah's Ark etc. shows the mixing of middle eastern Christian painting and Kerala's mural artwork.

== Cheppad Philipose Mar Dionysius ==
St George Orthodox Church is the resting place of Dionysius_IV_of_Cheppad, Malankara Metropolitan of the Malankara Orthodox Church during 1825–1855. Philipose Mar Dionysius, Malankara Metropolitan of Malankara Orthodox Church was born in 1781 at the Aanjilimootil family in Pallippad (a place near to Cheppad). After the death of Mar Dionysius III in 1825, Philipose Malpan of Aanjilimoottil, Pallipadu was ordained as Metropolitan Mar Dionysius IV for the Malankara Orthodox Syrian Church. The ruler of Travancore issued a Royal Proclamation acknowledging him as Malankara Metropolitan. He was not on good terms with the English missionaries who worked in Malankara Church under the English. The foreign missionaries suggested to reform the 'Qurbana norms' according to the Protestant standards, and to do away with the worship and prayer conducted for the dead, other suggestions included in raising of a fund to increase the salary of the priests, and giving ordination to only those priests who passed out from the Seminary and received the certificate from the Principal. The accounts of the Church every year must be submitted to the Resident for annual auditing the church services were to be conducted in Malayalam. The Metropolitan rejected all these suggestions outright. A meeting of the representatives of the church was convened in Puthiyacavu Church, Mavelikara in 1836 in order to discuss the recommendations of the missionaries. The Mavelikkara Padiyola was formulated in order to strongly resist the new reforms of the foreign missionaries. In 1846, the Patriarch sent a Metropolitan Yuyakim Mar Kurilos to Malankara. Later on, Mar Dionysius gave up the position of Malankara Metropolitan to avoid a split in the church and retired from administrative matters. He died on 9 October 1855. He was laid to rest in St. George Orthodox Church, Cheppad. His Death Anniversary is on 12 October every year.
