= Thottapuzhassery =

- village
- Location in Kerala, India Thottapuzhassery (India)
- Coordinates: 9°19′48″N 76°40′48″E
- Country: India
- State: Kerala
- District: Pathanamthitta

Languages
  - Official: Malayalam, English
- Time zone: UTC+5:30 (IST)
- Vehicle registration: KL-27 (Thiruvalla)

Thottapuzhassery is a village in Thiruvalla taluk, Pathanamthitta district in Kerala, India. It is situated opposite Aranmula.

== Location ==
As a village panchayat, Thottapuzhassery shares its boundaries with the holy River Pampa and three other panchayats, namely Ezhumatoor, Koipuram and Ayroor. The border of west Thottapuzhassery at maramon mosco padi after that koipuram panchyath belongs to Thiruvalla Town.

== History ==
Thottapuzhassery has a traditional and religious past and is mentioned in many religious myths. It is the main venue for the Christian Convention called Maramon Convention, which takes place during the third week of every February.

This place is historically related with the birth and growth of Malankara Mar Thoma Syrian Church and this village has Mayiladumpara Siva Temple, which is founded by Thapasyomal for the downtrodden people in the society. As per the believes this temple was founded very before Sree Narayana Guru.

== Tourism ==
Tourist sites in Thottapuzhassery include the Aruvikuzhi waterfalls, Charalkunnu Camp Center, Ponmalla, Retreat center Maramon, Pramadathu para, Mayiladumpara etc. Charalkunnu is a hill-station in Thottappuzhassery Panchayat.

=== Snake Boat ===
There is a Palliyodam (snake boat) named Thottapuzhassery. Every year it competes in the 'uthrattathi vallamkalie '(snake boat race) Aranmula Boat Race . It also accompanies Thiruvonathoni Goshayatra to Aranmula Temple. This place is between the Kozhancherry - Arattupuzha - Chengannur road.

=== Devi Temple ===
This village also has a famous old temple of Devi. On festival day there is a traditional Padayani (folk dance).

== Local administrative council ==
As of 2020, within the Thottapuzhassery panchayat, six out of 13 wards were led by independents, rather than the United Democratic Front or Left Democratic Front.

== Economy ==
Local businesses include Sree Ayyappa Farm Products, a supplier of plates and biryani containers made of palm leaf, as an alternative to plastic.
