= Dionysius III of Punnathra =

His Grace Mar Dionysius III, Mar Thoma XI Malankara Metropolitan
- Malankara Church
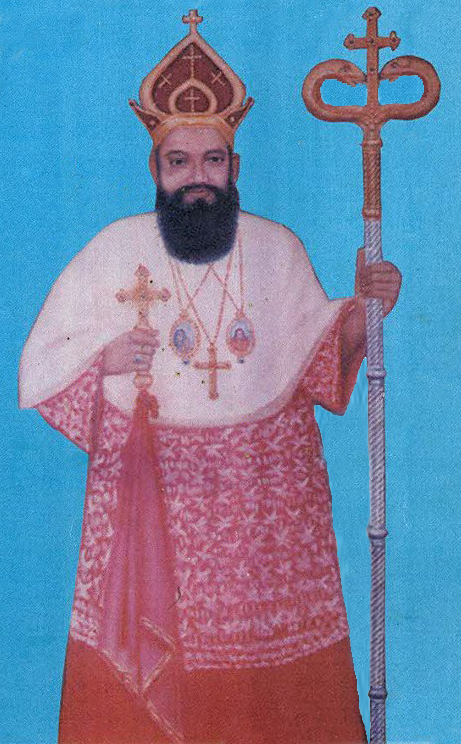
- A Portrait of Mar Dionysius III (11th Malankara Metropolitan)
- Installed: 19 October 1817
- Term ended: 19 May 1825
- Predecessor: Mar Dionysius II (1816); Geevarghese Philoxenos II (interim, 1816–1817)
- Successor: Mar Dionysius IV

Orders
- Consecration: 19 October 1817 by Geevarghese Philoxenos II

Personal details
- Born: 1777 Kottayam Thazhathangady
- Died: 19 May 1825 (aged 47–48) Kottayam
- Buried: Kottayam Cheriapally (St. Mary's Orthodox Syrian Church, Kottayam)

Mar Dionysius III, Mar Thoma XI, also known as Punnathra Mar Dionysius and born Kurien (1785 – 19 May 1825) was 11th Malankara Metropolitan and Successor to the Holy Apostolic Throne of St.Thomas from 1817 until his death. Dionysius had a long career in the Malankara Church prior to his consecration as Metropolitan. It was his suggestion during the time of Mar Thoma IX to establish the Syrian seminary at Kottayam, Kerala's first educational institution. He also welcomed some of the first missionary teachers who arrived from England to teach in the seminary. In 1816, following the demise of Mar Dionysius II, who had not appointed a successor, Kurien was elected to succeed him as the Malankara Metropolitan by the general assembly of the Church (Malankara Palliyogam) and was ordained as bishop by Geevarghese Mar Philoxenos II of the Malabar Independent Syrian Church.

== Early days ==
Kurien, who later became Mar Dionysious, was born in 1785 in the well known Punnathara family, Kottayam. Soon after his ordination he was appointed as a priest in his home parish Kallumkathra. As a representative of his parish he attended a number of meetings connected with the establishment of the Syrian Seminary.

== Primate of the Church ==
=== Consecration ===
Following the sudden demise of Pulikkottil Joseph Mar Dionysious I, on 24 November 1816, the British resident called a meeting of the Diwan (prime minister) of Travancore and elders of the church at Ernakulam. This meeting decided to appoint Geevarghese Mar Philexenos (Kidangan) (1811–29) of the Malabar Independent Syrian Church, who consecrated Pulikottil Joseph Mar Dionysius in 1816, to be the Acting Malankara Metropolitan. This was accepted and Maharajahas of both Travancore and Cochin issued royal proclamations to confirm this.

Geevarghese Mar Philexenos II did not want to take over the Malankara church. He convened a general assembly of the representatives of the parishes and they selected Punnathara Kurien Kathanar as the next Metropolitan. Kurien Kathanar handed over the responsibilities of Kallumkathra parish to Kaithayil Geevarghese Malpan.

Punnathra Kurien Ramban was ordained by Mar Philexenos (Kidangan) of the Malabar Independent Syrian Church on 19 October 1817.

=== Mavelikkara assembly ===
Punnathra Mar Dionysius was pressurised by Angilican missionaries who wanted to reform the Malankara Church. A meeting was held on 3 December 1818 at Mavelikkara to study the changes that can be implemented with the missionaries present. To suggest improvements to be made in the church, a six-member committee was appointed. Palakunnathu Abraham Malpan, Konattu Varghese Malpan, and Kaithayil Geevarghese Malpan were among them.

=== English missionaries ===
Anglican missionaries began to arrive in Kerala. Rev. Thomas Norton arrived in Kochi on 8 May 1816, and began to open schools in and around Alappuzha. Rev. Benjamin Baily arrived in October 1816 and established a printing press at the Syrian Seminary in Kottayam. He also began to translate the Bible into Malayalam. During the time of Punnathara Mar Dionysious Rev. Joseph Fenn arrived in 1818 October and was made the principal. Rev. Henry Baker arrived in 1819 April went round the parishes establishing schools near the churches. The Anglican missionaries maintained cordial relations with the Malankara Church during the reign of Mar Dionysius III, assisting in the theological education at the Seminary without interfering in the faith and administration of the Church.

=== The letter to the C.M.S. ===
An apologetic version of the Coonan Cross Oath in the letter of Dionysious Punnathara to the head of the Anglican Church Missionary Society from a translation of it out of the Syriac original:

"Mar Dionysius, Metropolitan of the Jacobite-Syrians in Malabar, subject to the authority of our Father, Mar Ignatius, Patriarch, who presides in the Apostolic See of Antioch of Syria, beloved of the Messiah. Love from Christ and the people of all the churches to Lord Gambier and ....
In the year of our Lord 1653, came our Spiritual Father, Mar Ignatius, the Patriarch, from Antioch to Malabar: but, when the Franks knew this, they brought the Holy Man to the walls of Cochin, imprisoned him in a cell and gave no small money to the King of Cochin. They then brought out the good man, and the drowned him in the sea, and so put him to death. But when we knew this, all the Jacobite Syrians in Malabar assembled in the Church of Mathancherry, which is in Cochin, and we swore a great oath, by the Father, Son, and Holy Ghost, that henceforth we would not adhere to the Franks, nor accept the faith of the Pope of Rome: we accordingly separated from them. A short time after this, some of our people again joined them, and received the faith of the Pope."

— The Missionary Register for M DCCC XXII

Here, the oath is presented as an opposition to the Pope himself.

== Relation with Travancore ==
During the time of Punnathara Mar Dionysious the relation with Travancore and Cochin was very cordial. The Ruler of Travancore Maharani Gowri Parvati Bayi, gave a number of privileges to the Seminary. For the first time in Travancore in 1818, Maha Rani appointed a number Christians as Judges.

== Last days ==
By 1825 there was an outbreak of Cholera in Kerala. A number of people lost their lives. Due to this disease, Punnathara Mar Dionysious died on 17 May 1825 and was interred at Kottayam Cheriapally (St. Mary's Orthodox Church). The memorial feast of Mar Dionysius III is observed on 19 May.

Malankara Church Titles
Preceded by Mar Dionysius II	Malankara Metropolitan of the Malankara Syrian Church; 1817–1825	Succeeded by Mar Dionysius IV

== See also ==
- Malankara Marthoma Syrian Church
- Indian Orthodox Church
- Syrian Malabar Nasrani
- Saint Thomas Christians
- List of Catholicoi of the East and Malankara Metropolitans
- List of Syrian Malabar Nasranis
- Mar Dionysius II
- Mar Dionysius IV
- Geevarghese Mar Philexenos II
