= Dionysius IV of Cheppad =

His Grace Mar Dionysius IV, Mar Thoma XII Malankara Metropolitan
- Malankara Church
- Installed: 27 August 1825
- Term ended: 1852
- Predecessor: Dionysius III
- Successor: Mathews Athanasius

Orders
- Consecration: 27 August 1825 by Geevarghese Mar Philoxenos II

Personal details
- Born: Cheppad Peelipose; 1781 Pallippad, Kingdom of Tracancore (present day Alappuzha, Kerala, India)
- Died: 9 October 1855 (aged 73–74) Cheppad, Kingdom of Travancore (present day Alappuzha, Kerala, India)
- Buried: St. George Orthodox Church, Cheppad

Dionysius IV, Mar Thoma XII (born Cheppad Peelipose (Aramaic and Malayalam: Piyliypaos, in English Philip) (1781 – 9 October 1855), was 12th Malankara Metropolitan from 27 August 1825, until he abdicated in 1852.

His tenure was a period of turmoil in the Malankara Church. When the Anglican Missionaries tried to interfere in the faith and administration of the Malankara church, the Church severed its relations with the Anglican missionaries through the historic Mavelikkara Synod of 1836. A negligible number of the members of the Church joined the C.M.S. Church. The remaining members were divided into two factions, one upholding the traditions that entered the Church, and the other in support of restoration based on principles propagated during the missionary activity of the Church Mission Society (CMS).

== Early life ==
Philipose Dionysius was born in 1781 at the Aanjilimootil family in Pallippad. Cheppad is a village located at Karthikapally Taluk of Alapuzha district in Kerala State, India. It is halfway between Kochi and Thiruvananthapuram on the National Highway 47.

== Malankara Metropolitan ==
Punnathara Dionysius Metropolitan (Dionysius III) died 17 May 1825. To select a successor, representatives of the parishes met together at Pallikara palli under the leadership of Philixinos II of Thozhyoor Church who was the Acting Malankara metropolitan at that time when the throne was vacant. The names of Pallippad Anjilimootil Philipose Malpan, Kalloopara Adangapurathu Joseph Malpan and Kottayam Eruthickal Markose Kathanar were proposed. Eruthickal Markose Kathanar withdrew his candidacy during the process and that left 2 strong contesters. After prayer, they cast lots (cleromancy), and the lot fell to Philipose Malpan. The title Malpan represents those who teach in the Theological Seminary. Adangapurathu Joseph Malpan later became the Vicar General of 72 Parishes at Malankara Syrian Church. Ittup Rampan Malpan (the Senior person among the 3 teachers of the Seminary "Ittup Rampan- who became Malankara Metropolitan as Dionysius II", "Adangapurathu Joseph Malpan", "Punnathra Kurien Malplan") was the source for the Orthodox Seminary "Old Seminary", as he took the initiative to submit an application to the proper authority in AD 1813, and the construction was completed in AD 1815. Palakkunnathu Abraham Malpan joined the Seminary at a later stage to teach the Syriac language there. At first, there were only 5 students, and in the following years the number of students grew significantly. Back then the Angamali Seminary was also available to educate students from the northern part of Malankara.

Philipose Ramban was consecrated by Geevarghese Mar Philoxenos II (Kidangan) of the Malabar Independent Syrian Church on 27 August 1825 at Kottayam Cheria palli. Philipose Ramban was given the episcopal title Cheppad Philipose Mar Dionysius. He was the fourth bishop in the Malankara Church to get this title Dionysius

== Consecrations ==
In 1829, Dionysius IV consecrated Geevarghese Koorilose (Kuthoorey) (1829–56), as the Metropolitan of Thozhyoor church.

== Obstacles during his reign ==
=== Problems with C.M.S. Missionaries ===
The relationship between the missionaries who came from England was cordial during the first few years. But soon they began to interfere in the internal affairs of the church. They tried to change the liturgy and practices of the Malankara church to their system. Without permission, they began worshipping using Anglican liturgy in the Old Seminary chapel. A letter from the bishop of Calcutta in 1835 suggested

1. to ordain only those who completed their studies from the Seminary and received the certificate from the Principal,
2. to raise a fund to increase the salary of the priests,
3. to submit the accounts of the Church every year to the British Resident for annual auditing and
4. to conduct the church services in vernacular, Malayalam.

The Metropolitan rejected all these suggestions outright. Soon Dionysius convened a meeting of the representatives of the parishes at Mavelikara (16 January 1836) and officially rejected the suggestions of the Anglican Bishop, stating that decisions on such a matter about faith was within the ambit of the Patriarch of Antioch. Even though the Association rejected those suggestions then, each of them was implemented in the Malankara Church in time. It can be concluded that the reason behind the rejection of the suggestions of the Anglican Bishop was that the Church was ready to accept timely changes only with the consent of an established authority & within a disciplined structure, and not simply based on a demanding letter from a Bishop of a foreign Church.

Soon the C.M.S. missionaries formed the C.M.S. Church. By a government award known as Cochin Award, they were given a few properties of the Malankara Church. The Association at Mavelikara gave official recognition to the Patriarch of Antioch as the spiritual head of the Malankara Church. Hence, it was at this time Malankara Church came to be referred to as Jacobite Church.

=== Problems with Abraham Malpan ===
Dionysius IV did not support reformation movement initiated by Abraham Malpan and his supporters. Abraham Malpan did not attend the Mavelikara Synod of 1836. When Abraham Malpan used the revised liturgy and brought about changes in practices, that offended and disappointed Dionysius IV, and suspended Malpan from religious duties & refused priesthood to the deacons trained under him. Dionysius remained staunch in his stand of upholding the traditional faith and liturgy of the Church.

Palakunnathu Deacon Mathews, a deacon trained under Abraham Malpan and was his nephew; through Malpan's encouragement and spiritual nurturing but without the permission of the Malankara Church and the Malankara Metropolitan, he went to Antioch. He was consecrated with the episcopal title Mathews Athanasius by Patriarch of Antioch, Ignatius Elias II (1838–47), in 1843.

In 1846, the Patriarch sent a Metropolitan Euyakim Kurilos to Malankara. In 1852 Dionysius IV abdicated due to poor health. At this time it was necessary for the government to find the successor of Dionysius for the purpose of paying the interest to a fixed deposit (Vattipanam) with the government. Mathews Athanasius and Kurilos made claims. The Maharajah of Travancore appointed a committee of four senior government officers (known as Kollam Panchayat), They decided that a foreign bishop could not be regarded as the Malankara Metropolitan. So the Maharajah proclaimed in favour of Mathews Athanasius on 30 August 1852. Even though Athanasius lacked the support of the general assembly of the Church (Malankara Palli-Yogam), the fact that he was a native favoured him.

== Last days ==
After abdicating, Valia Methrachen (Dionysius IV) was bedridden due to ill health. The people who were with him all these years left him for the changes that had happened. When Mathews Athanasius became aware of this he immediately came to Cheppadu and had done all things necessary for Cheppadu thirumeni. He stayed with him for more than two months and he arranged aide and medical help from Thiruvalla. On 9 October 1855, Cheppad Philipose Dionysius died and was laid to rest at Cheppad Valiyapalli (St. George Orthodox Church). The last ceremonies were done by Mathews Athanasious.

The Church remembers Dionysius on 12 October.

== Succession ==
Malankara Church Titles
Preceded by Mar Dionysius III	Malankara Metropolitan of the Malankara Syrian Church; 1825–1852	Succeeded by Mathews Mar Athanasius

== See also ==
- Mar Thoma Syrian Church
- Indian Orthodox Church
- List of Catholicoi of the East and Malankara Metropolitans
- List of Syrian Malabar Nasranis
