= Maramon =

- village
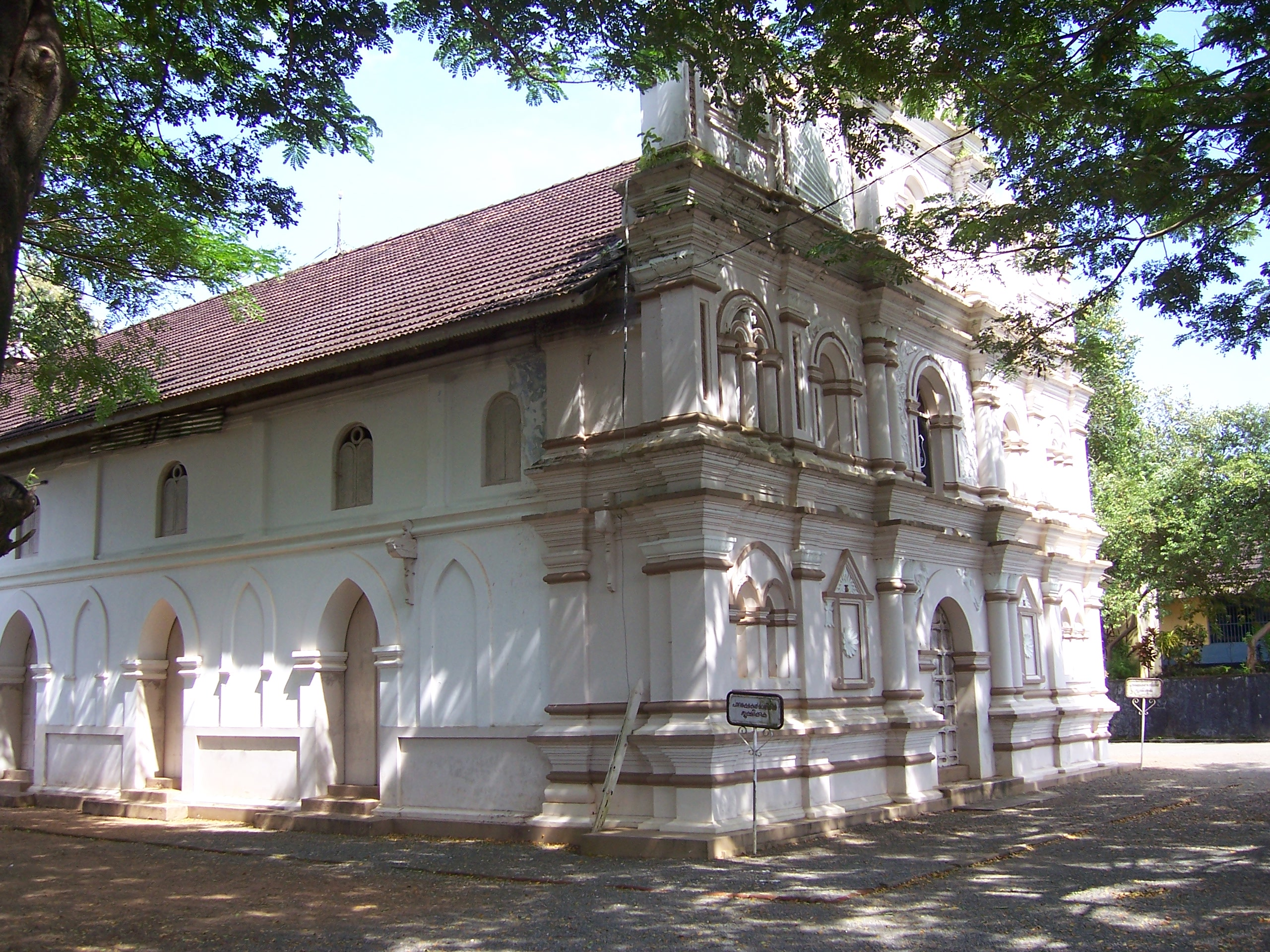
- Mar Thoma Church
- Interactive map of Maramon
- Coordinates: 9°20′0″N 76°41′0″E
- Country: India
- State: Kerala
- Thiruvalla Taluk District: Pathanamthitta

Government
  - Body: Thottapuzhassery Grama Panchayat

Languages
  - Official: Malayalam, English
- Time zone: UTC+5:30 (IST)
- PIN: 689549
- Vehicle registration: KL-27
- Nearest Town: Kozhencherry
- Lok Sabha constituency: Pathanamthitta

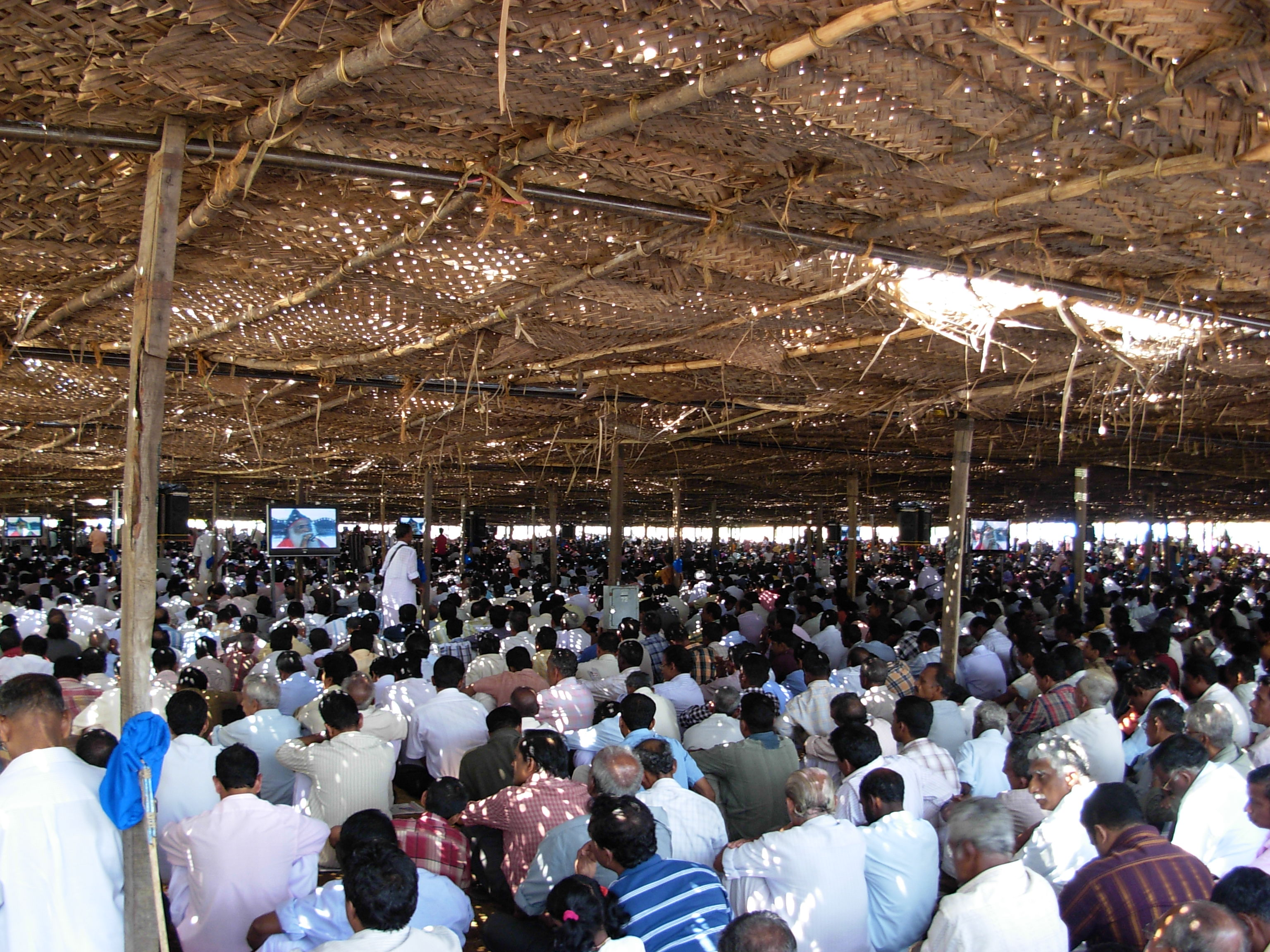
The Maramon Convention

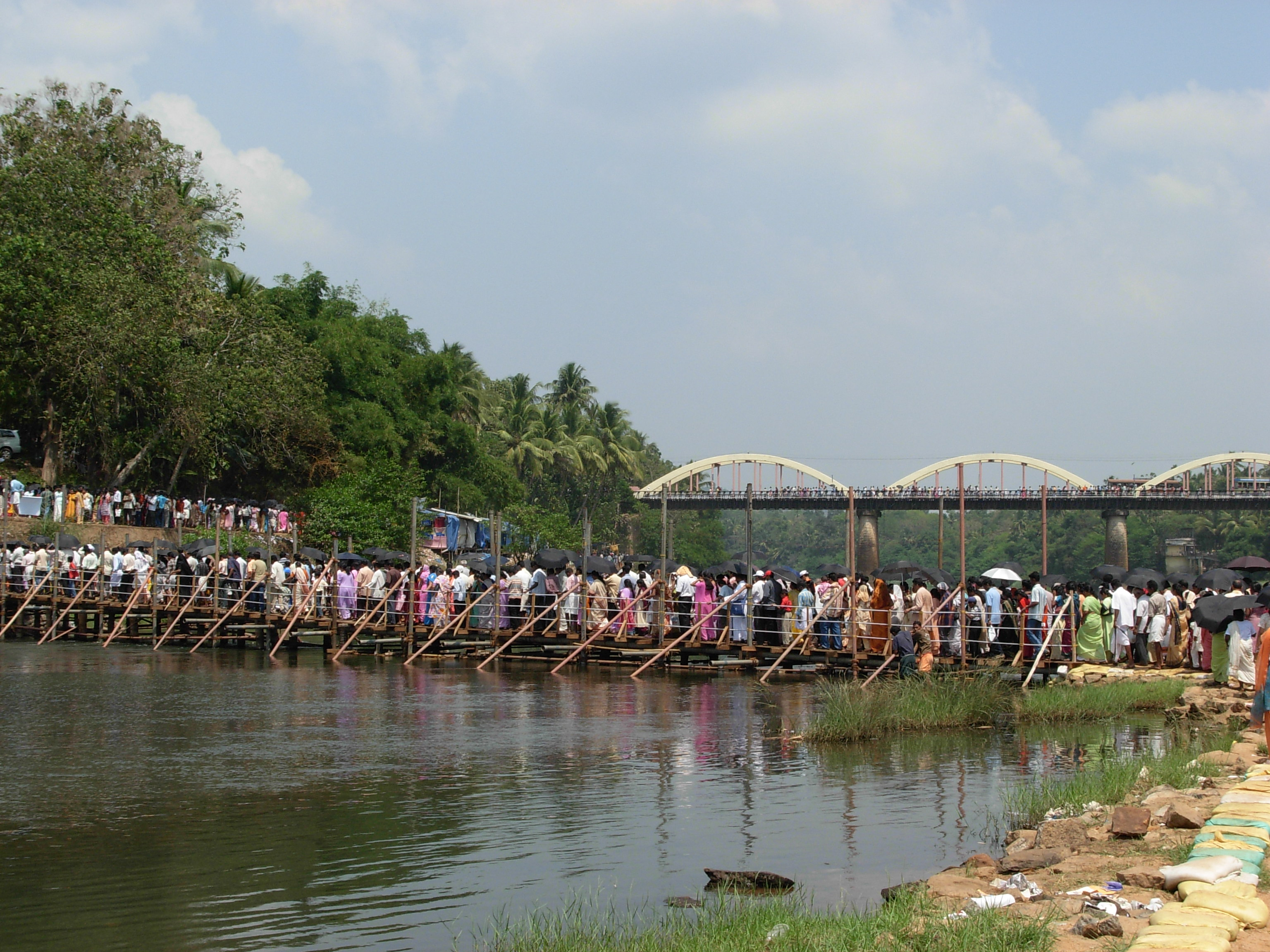
Maramon Convention Event

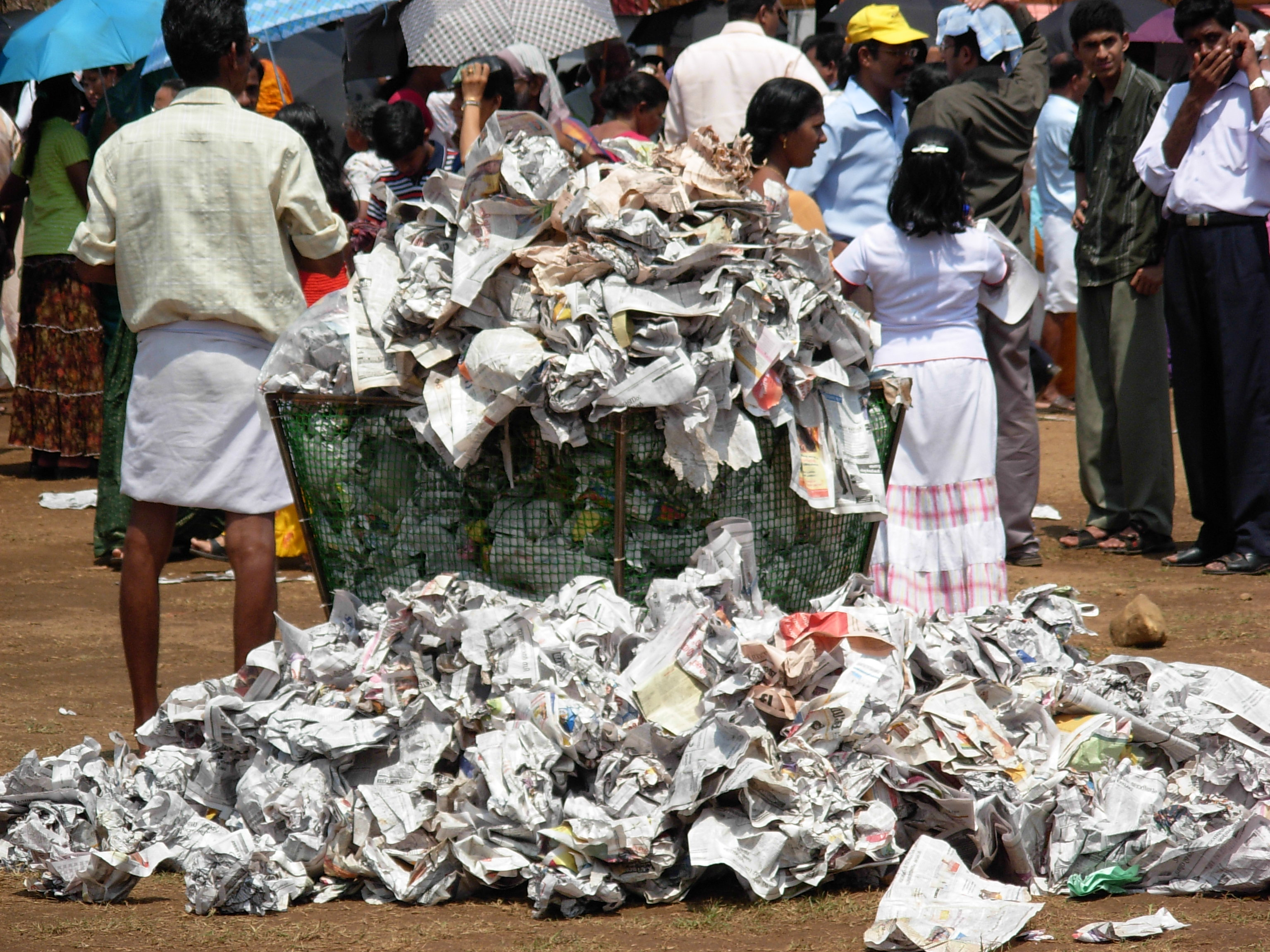
Eco Friendly initiative

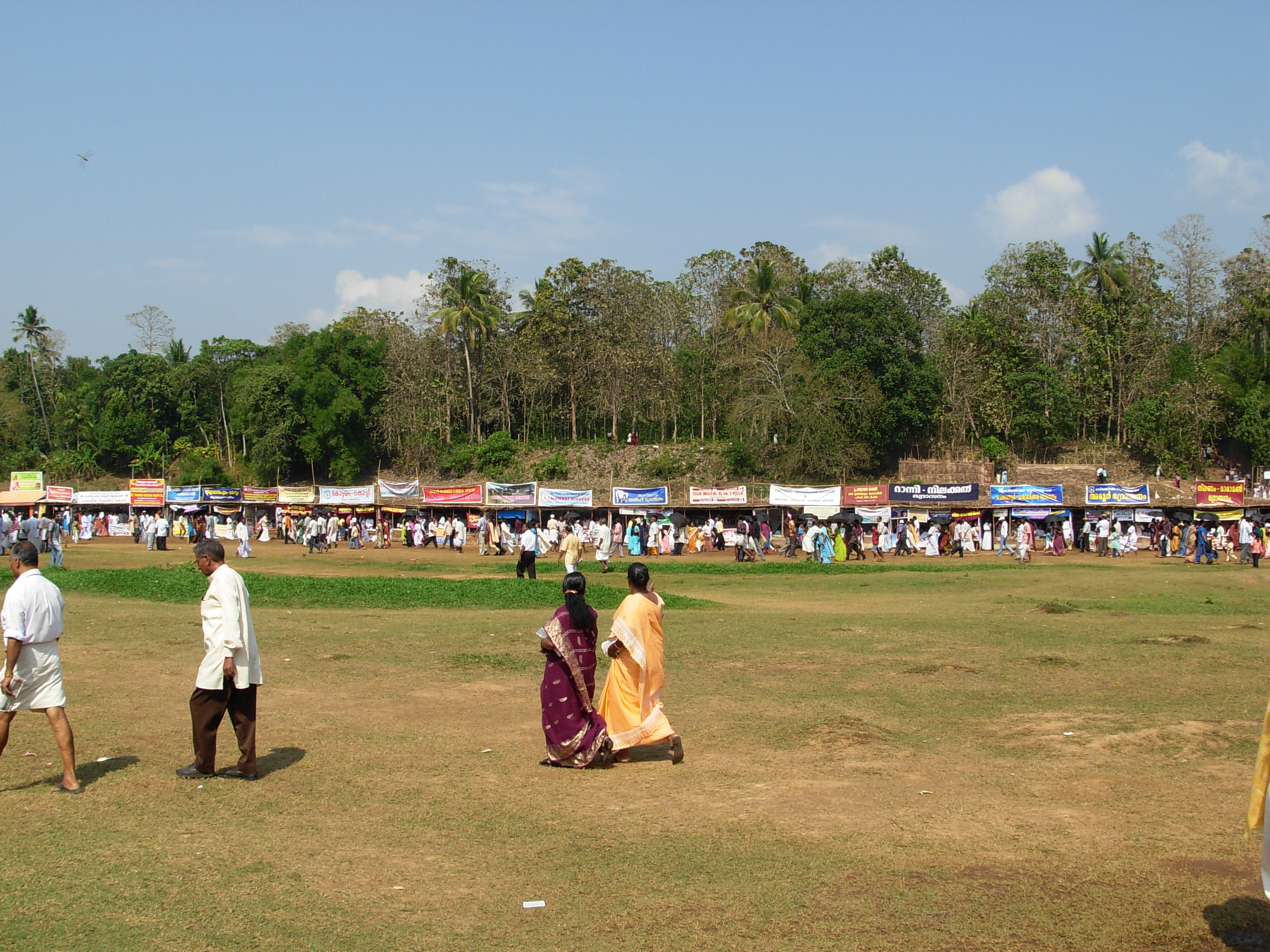
Shops for the festival

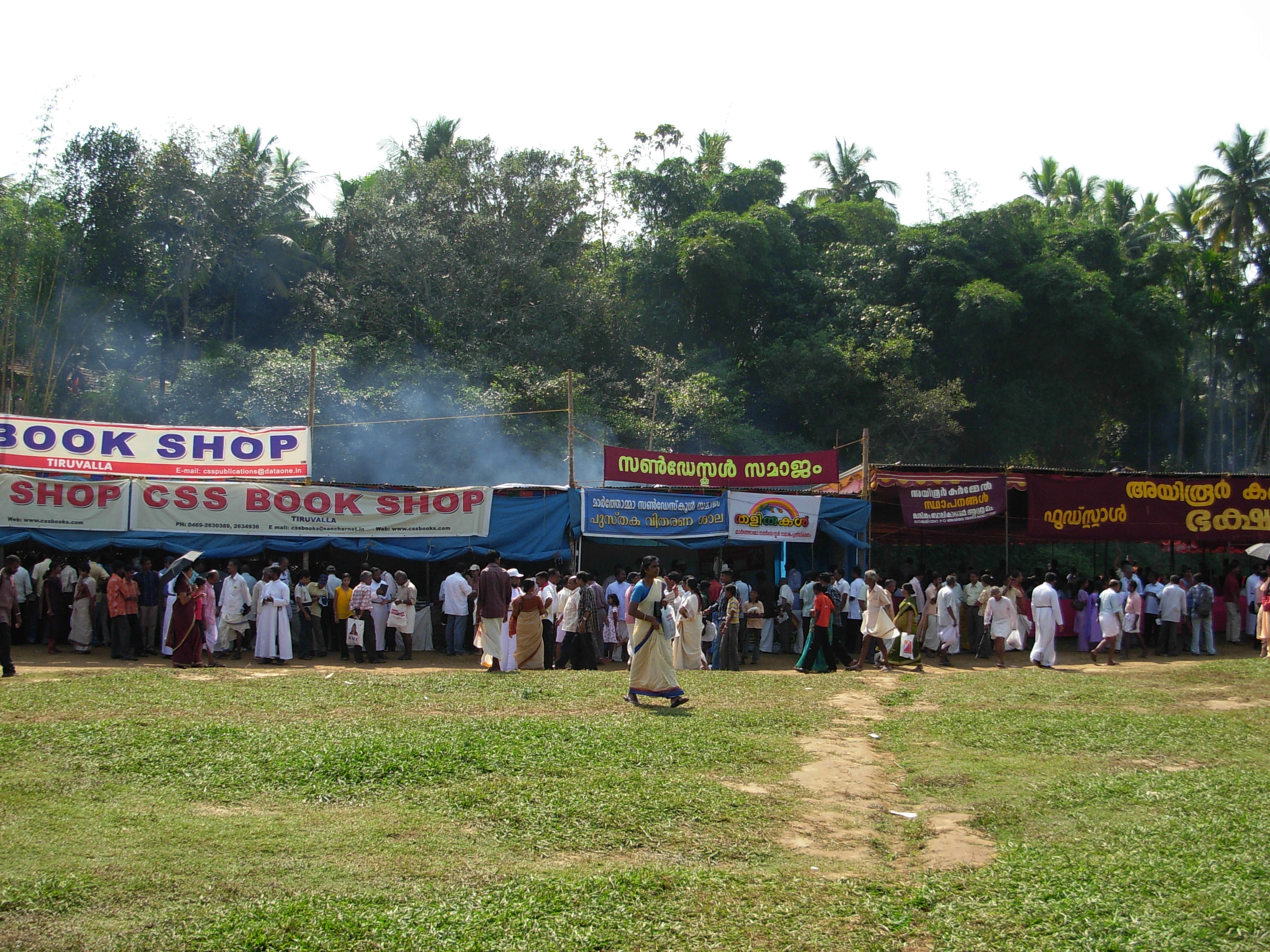
Another view of the stalls

Maramon is a small village on the Pampa River in Thiruvalla taluk & Thiruvalla Revenue Division of Pathanamthitta district in the state of Kerala, India.

== See also ==
- Maramon Convention
- Thottapuzhassery
- Aranmula Parthasarathy Temple
- Chettimukku Devi Temple
- Thiruvalla
