= Priest Trustee =

The position of Priest Trustee (or Clergy trustee) in the Malankara Orthodox Syrian Church is of paramount importance in the administration of the Church, together with the Malankara Metropolitan and the lay trustee. The priest trustee is a priest of order Kasheesha or Cor-Episcopa.

== Origin ==
The system of governing the assets of the Malankara Church by the Community of Trustees was brought about by the historic Cochin Panchayath Verdict of 4 April 1840 (also known as Cochin Award). The verdict insists that the three trustees who constitute the Community Trustees should be elected to those positions. In accordance with this, the first priest trustee was elected in 1869 and the Church Constitution of 1934 gives the definitive account on the election, term, duties and scope of the priest trustee.

== Authority of the Priest Trustee ==
The priest trustee is, by default, a member of the Malankara Association Managing Committee as well as the Working Committee of the Association Managing Committee. As per section C in chapter IV of the 1934 constitution, the three trustees are entrusted with the trusteeship for the Vattipanam (Trust Fund) and the Kottayam Syrian Seminary and the income which have accrued or shall be accruing therefrom.

== Election ==
Section C in chapter IV of the 1934 constitution describes the regulations for election to the position of the associate trustees and their term in office. Clause 93 states: The Association shall elect the Associate Trustees.

== Term in office ==
Until 2006, there was no fixed term duration for the office of Priest trustee. Once elected, a trustee was expected to serve to that capacity until death or deposition. However, trustee Manalil Yakob kathanar set an example by resigning after ten years. In 2006, Clause 93 in the Church constitution was amended to limit the term in office for both Priest trustee as well as Lay trustee to five years, to align with the five-year validity of each Malankara Association. Clause 93 states: The term of office of the Associate Trustees shall be co-terminus as that of the period of election of the Association members. The office of the associate trustee will continue until another trustee was elected and assumed office. The Association may remove them and appoint others without assigning any reason.

== List of Priest Trustees ==
- Chacko Chandypillai, Thazhath (21 October 1869 – 13 September 1886)

In the Association meeting held at Kottayam Old Seminary on 21 October 1869, presided by Malankara Metropolitan Palakkunnath Mathews Athanasius, Thazhath Chacko Chandypillai was elected as the first priest trustee.

- Kora Yohannan Malpan, Konat (13 September 1886 – 9 March 1890)

During the Association meeting held from 11 to 13 September 1886 at Kottayam Old Seminary which was presided by Malankara Metropolitan Dionysius V, Konat Kora Yohannan was elected as the priest trustee.

- Kora Mathen Malpan, Konat (23 November 1895 – 7 September 1911)

From 21 to 23 November 1895, a meeting of the Association convened at the Old Seminary chaired by Dionysius V during which Konat Kora Mathen Malpan was elected as the priest trustee. He had been given the honorary title of Malankara Malpan in 1890. Later, during the dispute over the authority of the Patriarch of Antioch over Malankara, Konat Kora Mathen Malpan was a staunch supporter of the Patriarch, opposing the Malankara Metropolitan Dionyius VI. This led to the deposition of Konat Kora Mathen Malpan from trusteeship in 1911.

- Mani Paulose, Palappallil (7 September 1911 – 24 December 1955)

Following the removal of Konat Kora Mathen Malpan from trusteeship, the Association meeting held on 7 September 1911 at Kottayam M. D. Seminary elected Palappallil Mani Paulose as the priest trustee. He was the longest serving Priest Trustee in the history of the Malankara Church. As a solution to the threats faced by the Catholicos Baselius Paulose I in the administration of Kandanad diocese from the dissident faction, Mani Paulose played a central role in inviting the Catholicos to shift the Holy See to Pampakuda on 16 April 1913, from where the Catholicos reigned until his death on 2 May 1913. Paulose I was interred in Pampakuda Cheriyapally. As Priest Trustee, Mani Paulose served to that capacity for 44 years until his death in 1955. He died on 25 December 1955 and was interred at Pampakkuda Cheriyapally, the same Church where Paulose I is buried.

- Yakob, Manalil (26 December 1958 – 28 December 1965)

The Association meeting held at Puthencavu St. Mary's Church on 26 December 1958, presided by Baselios Geevarghese II elected Manalil Yakob as the priest trustee. Yakob who had served as secretary to Malankara Metropolitan Vattasseril Dionyius VI during 1925–1934 thus received the interest of Vattipanam (Trust Fund) before and after becoming the priest trustee. In order to establish a particular duration for the term of priest trustees, he set an example by resigning in 1965 after completing ten years in office. In spite of being elected to the order of Metropolitan, he rejected the honor. From 1939, he served as a member of Malankara Association Managing Committee for almost five and a half decades until his death in 1993. Manalil Yakob died on 17 January 1993 and was buried at Yuhanon Church, Manthuruthel.

- T. S. Abraham Cor-Episcopa, Thengumthottathil (28 December 1965 – 28 December 1982)

After the resignation of Manalil Yakob kathanar, the Malankara Association meeting which convened at Kottayam M. D. Seminary presided by Baselios Augen I elected Thengumthottathil Very T. S. Abraham Cor-Episcopa as the priest trustee. He remained stalwart at the side of the Malankara Metropolitan and played a major role in leading the Church safely through a period of several litigations. He died on 30 October 1984.

- Abraham Malpan, Konat (28 December 1982 – 2 March 1987)

On 28 December 1982, the Malankara Association meeting held at M. G. M. School, Thiruvalla presided by Baselios MarThoma Mathews I elected Konat Abraham Malpan as the priest trustee. Born to Konat Mathen Chor-episcopa on 30 March 1908, he was a disciple of Baselios Augen I. The title of Malankara Malpan was bestowed on him by Baselios Geevarghese II on 3 July 1963. He had also served as the president of Pampakuda Panchayath (village council) for a long time. Abraham Malpan died on 2 March 1987, and was buried at St. John's Valiyapally, Pampakuda.

- Mathai Nooranal (29 December 1987 – 29 November 2002)

The first competitive election to the position of priest trustee was carried out during the Association meeting held at Kottayam M. D. Seminary, presided by Baselios MarThoma Mathews I. Mathai Nooranal emerged as the winner in the third round and assumed the office of priest trustee. He served until his death on 29 November 2002 and he was buried at St. Mary's Church, Sultan Bathery.

- O. Thomas (10 June 2004 – 21 March 2007)

On 10 June 2004, the Association meeting held at Parumala Seminary presided by Baselios MarThoma Mathews II elected O. Thomas as the priest trustee. He served in that capacity till 2007. O. Thomas is a noted writer and theologian who has also served as a professor at the Old Seminary since 1981. In 2015, he was appointed as the Principal of the Old Seminary by Baselios MarThoma Paulos II.

- Johns Abraham, Konat (21 March 2007 – 1 March 2017)

Johns Abraham, Konat served as the priest trustee for two terms (2007–2017). He was re-elected for a second term by the meeting of Malankara Association held at Pathanamthitta on 7 March 2012, presided by Catholicos of the East and Malankara Metropolitan Baselios Mar Thoma Paulose II. An authority on Church Canons, Liturgy and Syriac language, Johns Abraham Konat also serves as a professor at the Old Seminary.

- M. O. John (1 March 2017 – 4 August 2022)

The Malankara Association meeting held at Kottayam M. D. Seminary on 1 March 2017 and presided by Malankara Metropolitan Baselios Mar Thoma Paulose II Catholicos elected Dr. M. O. John as the Priest Trustee. He held that position as the only living trustee among the three trustees of the Malankara Church through the critical period between the demise of Catholicos Paulose II on 12 July 2021 and the election of successor Metropolitan Dr. Mathews Mar Serverios on 14 October 2021. He served one full term as the trustee until 2022.

- Thomas Varghese Amayil - Incumbent (4 August 2022 - present)

The Malankara Association meeting held at Pathanapuram Mount Thabor Dayara on 4 August 2022 and presided by Malankara Metropolitan Baselios Marthoma Mathews III Catholicos elected Dr. Thomas Varghese Amayil as the priest trustee.
