= Mar Gregorios Orthodox Christian Student Movement =

MGOCSM
- Mar Gregorios Orthodox Christian Student Movement

Location
- MGOCSM Student Centre, College Road, Kottayam, Kerala 686 001; India

Information
- Motto: Worship, Study, Service.
- Religious affiliations: Orthodox, Oriental Orthodox
- Denomination: Malankara Orthodox Syrian Church (Indian Orthodox)
- Patron saint: St. Geevarghese Mar Gregorios of Parumala
- Established: 1908
- Founders: Students of the Malankara Orthodox Syrian church
- Status: Active
- Catholicos of the East and Malankara Metropolitan: H.H Moran Mar Baselios Marthoma Mathews III
- President of MGOCSM: H.G Abraham Mar Seraphim
- Vice President of MGOCSM: H.G Zacharias Mar Aprem
- General Secretary: Fr.Vivek Varghese
- Website: http://mgocsm.in https://mgocsmamerica.com

Mar Gregorios Orthodox Christian Student Movement (MGOCSM) is the oldest Christian Student Organization in Asia. It is a spiritual organization of the Indian Orthodox Church, officially known as the Malankara Orthodox Syrian Church for the student community. The MGOCSM headquarters is located in Devalokam, Kottayam, Kerala, India.

== History ==
The students and senior leaders of the Church who were residing in Madras in the early part of the last century felt the need for an organization to bring together Christian students in various colleges and high schools with a view to deepening their spiritual life and to create in them a lively sense of fellowship. The Syrian Student Conference, the parent organization was formed in 1907 and the first conference was convened on 1–3 January 1908 at Balikamadom School, Tiruvalla, Kerala. Annual Conferences have been a regular feature since 1908. From 1912 to 1960 it was called St Thomas Syrian Students Movement. The movement adopted the name of MGOCSM in 1960 after joining with Jacobite faction, with its motto is Worship, Study, Service, after its merger with MGSSA (Mar Gregorios Syrian Students' Association), then the students wing of Jacobite Church. And in 1972 it had a split forming SOSMI (Syrian Orthodox Students Movement of India), the Student wing of Jacobite Church which was later renamed as JASSMI (Jacobite Syrian Students Movement of India) in 2002 and then as Mor Gregorios Jacobite Students' Movement (MGJSM) in 2009.

The strength of the movement is the wide network of its units centered in educational institutions and major parishes spread all over India and outside. MGOCSM has been maintaining inter-disciplinary contacts in the academic field for a long time by the formation of its wings. They include the High School, Higher Secondary, College students’ wings, University, Higher Secondary, High School teachers’ associations, Medical Auxiliary, Technical Auxiliary, Missionary Forum, Literary Forum, and the Publication wing.

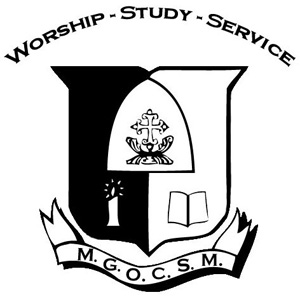

Student Centres at Kottayam, Thiruvananthapuram, Kothamangalam, Alwaye and Davengere stand as fitting monuments to the continuous and tireless efforts of the movement during the past years. Each Student Centre provides hostel facilities in addition to a chapel, an auditorium, a reading room and guest rooms. Mar Theophilus Study Centre in Kottayam is used for conducting seminars, study classes and the like. Our dream of establishing other student centres is also coming to life in Pampady, Iritty, Bangalore, Chennai and Kolar. MGOCSM Bookshop and Publishing House at Kottayam continue to function purposefully. The Orthodox Study Bible, Total Education for 100 students, Financial assistance and scholarship to students of low income group, outside Kerala student chaplain services and CHAIROS - Centenary building complex are major projects of the Centenary 2008. The movement has appointed priests in major educational centres to carry on the student mission. A Diaspora secretariat has also opened with its office at Nagpur to co-ordinate the youngsters born and brought up outside Kerala.

The high ideals behind finding of the movement included bringing together the Orthodox Christian students of different educational institutions into one body in order to get them rooted in Orthodox faith and traditions and to strengthen them in spiritual life and Christian fellowship. The movement has grown as an international one with about 1500 units all over the world. It has been maintaining inter-disciplinary contacts in the academic field for a long time by the formation of its wings. They are the high school, higher secondary, college-post college wings; University, higher secondary, high school teachers association, medical auxiliary, technical auxiliary, missionary forum, literary forum and publication wing.

== Active Regions ==
1. Kerala - South Region
2. Kerala - North Region
3. Outside Kerala - North and East
4. Outside Kerala - West and South
5. Gulf Region
6. America and Canada Region
7. East Asia Region
8. UK, Europe and Africa Region

== Objective ==
The movement has three main objectives. The aims of the movement are to:

- bring together students of the Malankara Orthodox Syrian Church with a view of deepening their spiritual lives and also to create spiritual fellowship
- enable members to bear witness to the Lordship of Jesus Christ and spread the gospel
- help members and others grow as disciples of Jesus Christ and resemble the image and likeness of Christ.

== Famous alumni ==
Noted alumni include Metropolitan Dr. Stephanos Mar Theodosious, Metropolitan Dr. Philipose Mar Theophilos, Metropolitan Dr. Paulose Mar Gregorios (Theologian & Former President, WCC), Shri C.M. Stephen (Former Union Cabinet Minister), Alexander Joseph and Dr. P.C. Alexander M.P. (Former Governor of Maharashtra and Tamil Nadu).

== Activities ==
The unit meets every Sunday after the Holy Qurbana. The sessions consist of prayer, bible reading, devotional songs, classes/speeches, quizzes, personality development programs, games, entertainment programs etc. Various other activities which do justice to the motto are also organized. Some of them are:

- Classes on faith, liturgy, and traditions of the church.
- Educational orientation classes and personality development programs.
- Providing study materials, uniforms, and other scholarships to financially backward students.
- Awards for academic excellence.
- Providing clothes, medicines, and financial aid to the needy.
- Annual grants to selected orphanages and charitable institutions.
- Arts and sports competitions for Sunday School students, during Onam Holidays.
- Annual tours to various Christian centers and other important places.
- Quiz and Light Music competitions.
- Publishing Newsletters and Magazines (for circulation among members only).

MGOCSM helps students to review the Sunday school topics, discuss the disturbing thoughts, and doubts they carry, enlighten through seminars and conferences, etc. Nurses Christian Fellowship of India is a fellowship of Christian Nurses across the faith irrespective of the domain started by Late H. G. Dr. Zachariah Mar Theophilos Metropolitan, Former General Secretary, MGOCSM. NCFIN is the largest community of Christian Nurses in India.

== Membership ==
Any student who is thirteen years or older and is enrolled in a school, college, university or institute and a member of the Malankara Orthodox Syrian Church is eligible to become a member of MGOCSM

== Global Conferences ==
MGOCSM organizes Global Conferences annually. 109th MGOCSM Global Annual Conference was held at MBC College of Engineering, Peerumed, Kerala from 27 December to 30 December 2017. 108th Mgocsm Global Conference was held at Baselius College, Kottayam, Kerala, India from 26 December to 29 December 2016 107th MGOCSM Global Conference was held at Catholicate college, Pathanamthitta, Kerala, India from 22 December to 26 December 2015. 106th MGOCSM Global Conference was held at Christian College of Engineering & Technology, Bhilai Chhattishgarh, INDIA from 2 October to 5 October 2014. 105th MGOCSM Global Conference was held at Thiruvananthapuram in December 2013.

== Centenary ==
The movement celebrated hundred years of service to the Church and society in 2009. Ethiopian Patriarch Abune Paulos was the chief guest at the public meeting held on 30 December 2008, in connection with the centenary global conference at Parumala Seminary where the patron saint is entombed. In his inaugural address, the Patriarch stressed the need for upholding Christian values in this age of ‘conflicts and chaos.’ He also said that India was a fast-growing economy and added that Ethiopians and Indians had many similarities. The Catholicos of the East and Malankara Metropolitan Baselios Marthoma Didymus I presided over the meeting. The Catholicos also conferred the Order of St. Thomas, the supreme award of the Malankara Orthodox Church, on the Ethiopian Patriarch on the occasion. Gerima W. Kirkos, Abba Timotheos Tesfa and Abba Dioscoros, Archbishops from Ethiopia, accompanied the Patriarch. Mr. Oommen Chandy, Metropolitans Geevarghese Mar Osthathios, Geevarghese Mar Coorilos, Mathews Mar Severios, Gabriel Mar Gregorios, Paulose Mar Pachomios, Youhanon Mar Chrysostomos, Thomas Mar Athanasius, Kuriakos Mar Cleemis, Zacharias Mar Theophilus, Zacharias Mar Anthonios, and other dignitaries including Jiji Thomson IAS, Malankara Association secretary George Joseph, MGOCSM vice-president Anju Paulose, general secretary Fr V.M. Abraham (later Abraham Mar Seraphim), Parumala seminary manager Fr M. D. John, priest trustee Fr Johns Abraham Konattu; and lay trustee M. George Muthoottu also addressed the meet.
