= Cheeranchira =

Cheeranchira Veroor
- town
- Location in Kerala, India Cheeranchira (India)
- Coordinates: 9.4775931°N 76.566574°E
- Country: India
- State: Kerala
- District: Kottayam

Government
  - Type: Democracy
  - Body: Panchayat

Languages
  - Official: Malayalam, English
- Time zone: UTC+5:30 (IST)
- PIN: 686106
- Vehicle registration: KL-33
- Nearest city: Kottayam, Town - Changanacherry

Cheeranchira is a suburb of Changanasserry town, Kerala State in India. It is around 4 km from the town and is one of the first settlements in Changanasserry Taluk. Situated at present within the Vazhappally Grampanchayat, it shares its borders with Vakathanam panchayat as well. The village is the tenth ward in Vazhappally Gramapanchayat and is represented at present by Sashin Thalakulam (Indian National Congress).

== Origin of the name ==
The name Cheeranchira is believed to have its roots in perhaps the land's original ownership by an individual named Cheeran. From Cheeran's chira (small parcel of land mostly surrounded by water) the land got its name Cheeran is an archaic Malayali name. Another speculation is that the locality was infested by thorny amaranths (Amaranthus spinosus) plants (മുള്ളഞ്ചീര) giving it the name Cheera-chira, which later became Cheeranchira. The land is also referred to as Veroor Muriyil by various legal documents of the previous decades.

== Luminaries ==
=== Anju Bobby George ===
It was here that Anju Bobby George was born and spent her early years. Anju Bobby George made history when she won the bronze medal in the Long Jump at the 2003 World Championships in Athletics in Paris, becoming the first Indian athlete ever to win a medal at a World Championships in Athletics by clearing 6.70 m. She went on to win the gold medal at the IAAF World Athletics Final in 2005, a performance she considers the best of her career. Over the years, she also secured medals at the Asian Games (Gold), Commonwealth Games (becoming the first Indian woman athlete to win a medal in athletics — a Bronze), Asian Athletics Championships (Gold), and the Afro-Asian Games (Gold). In recognition of her achievements, the country has honored her with the Padma Shri, Rajiv Gandhi Khel Ratna, and the Arjuna Award.

=== Rev. Fr. T C Jacob Thalakulam ===
Rev. Fr. T. C. Jacob Thalakulam (1907–1976), also known as Managerachen, was the manager of Old Seminary of the Malankara Orthodox Church for 30 years and the manager of Malankara Orthodox Catholicate Headquarters for another 15 years. He was an eminent figure of the Malankara Orthodox community during his lifetime. He had worked along with prominent metropolitans including St. Geevarghese Mar Dionysius of Vattasseril and also with three Catholicoses of the East namely H.H Baselios Geevarghese II, H.H.Baselios Augen I, and H.H. Baselios Mar Thoma Mathews I. Fr. T.C. Jacob Memorial Upper Primary School was established to preserve the memory of this luminary in his native village.

== Community ==
=== Cheeranchira Cooperative Bank ===
The Cheeranchira Service Co-operative Bank was started in the mid 20th century as a cooperative society to serve the local community with banking services and agricultural support. The bank has its headquarters at Bankpadi, situated about 1 km from Valiyakulam with a branch at Kurishumood.

It was founded by a group of local leaders, and its founding president was Korula Mathew Moolayil. The current president of the bank is Advt. Joseph Philip, and vice president is Shri. Mathew C. Thomas.

=== Charity World Jimmy Padanilam Center ===
Charity World Trust (CWT), was established on 7 May 2014 and functions in Changanacherry Taluk of Kottayam district. CWT is a non- profit, non- discriminatory entity established to serve the society at large with special focus on the sick, poor & downtrodden, the physically & mentally impaired, orphans, senior citizens etc. Over the last two years the activities gained momentum and great acceptance among the entire community cutting across all barriers of caste, creed and religion.

The activities of the trust are carried out through various schemes (details mentioned elsewhere) tailor-made to meet specific needs of the target groups. The Jimmy Padanilam Centre for Special Needs caters exclusively for the overall well-being of the mentally impaired. The entire activities of the trust is being run with the financial support from benefactors. The donations made to the trust are eligible for exemption under section 80(G) of Indian Income Tax Act for the donor. The headquarters of the trust and the Jimmy Padanilam Centre is housed in a three-storied building on a 1.5-acre plot donated by one such enlightened benefactor Dr. George Padanilam and family.

=== Seeds social club and charitable society ===
Seeds is a social club and charitable society (Reg. No. KTM/TC/372/2013), concentrating on helping the poor and needy in and around Cheeranchira. This club also is doing several public interest activities in Cheeranchira towards the betterment of the locality.

Seeds was established in 2012 and currently has 23 members. This society has been aiding the people of Cheeranchira with the donations of the club members without any contributions from Public. The main activities are the help with Fr. Chiramel Kidney foundation and other activities like distribution of Wheel chairs, aid to Cancer patients etc. etc. Seeds is also behind the beautification of Cheeranchira Thengana Road, here they have planted trees and is taking care of them; this beautiful part of Cheeranchira is known as 'Seeds Vayaloram' now.

Seeds got affiliated with Nehru Yuva Kendra (Central Government, Reg. No. NYK/KTM/MDP/19/2021) and Kerala State Youth Welfare Board (Reg. No. KTM5955) in 2022.

=== Educational institutions ===
1. Government Lower Primary School, Cheeranchira
2. Rev.Fr. T. C. Jacob Memorial Upper Primary School

=== Religious Institutions ===
In the chronological order of their establishment.

1. St. Mary's Malankara Orthodox Church
2. Salvation Army Church
3. Sree Narayana Temple
4. CSI Church
5. Mor Adai Study Center, a Jacobite Christian publishing house
6. St. George Syro-Malabar Church
7. ASMI convent
8. St. Mary's Jacobite Syrian Shrine under St. Adais Malankara Jacobite Syriac Orthodox Church, Nalunnakkal

=== Agrarian and Medical Enterprises ===
1. Seeds Ventures : Is a Business Initiative by young entrepreneurs in Cheeranchira, with its Head quarters at XII/325 Cheeranchira
2. M.L. Coffee (Moolayil Coffee): a locally owned coffee powder company which uses coffee beans collected from Cheeranchira and its environs with a distribution area covering the three districts in the central Travancore region.
3. Thara Health Clinic : A signature institution of Cheeranchira, Thara Homeopathic clinic is run by Dr. Shashi, a homeopathic physician.
