= Vallikkattu Dayara =

Indian Orthodox church in Kottayam, India

Malankara Orthodox Syrian Church
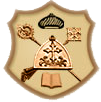
- Catholicate Emblem
- Primate: Baselios Mar Thoma Paulose II
- Language: Malayalam, English, Hindi, Konkani, Kannada, Syriac
- Headquarters: Kottayam, India
- Territory: Universal
- Possessions: United Arab Emirates; Kuwait; Oman; Qatar; Bahrain; Germany; Switzerland; United States; Canada; United Kingdom; Ireland; South Africa; Malaysia; Singapore; New Zealand; Australia
- Independence: Apostolic Era
- Recognition: Oriental Orthodox

Vallikattu Dayara is a monastery of the Indian Orthodox Church founded by Pulikkottil Joseph Mar Dionysious II in 1868.

== History ==
A parish church is built in 2 .5 acres (20,000 m^{2}) of land in Ayanattukunnil, Vakathanam that was received on lease from the Travancore government in 1868.

In 1925 he was elevated to Catholicos of the East, assuming the title Baselios Geevarghese I, it became the Headquarters of the Catholicos of the East.

== Tombs ==
In 1928 Baselios Geevarghese I, Catholicos of the East, also known as (Vallikattu Bava), was buried in Vallikattu Dayara.

15 August (Shunoyo Feast) and 17 December (anniversary of Baselios Geevarghese I) are the important feast days for the Dayara.

== See also ==
- Malankara Orthodox Syrian Church
- Baselios Geevarghese I
