= Garegin II =

Incumbent Patriarch of the Armenian Apostolic Church

His Holiness Garegin II Գարեգին Բ
- Supreme Patriarch and Catholicos of All Armenians
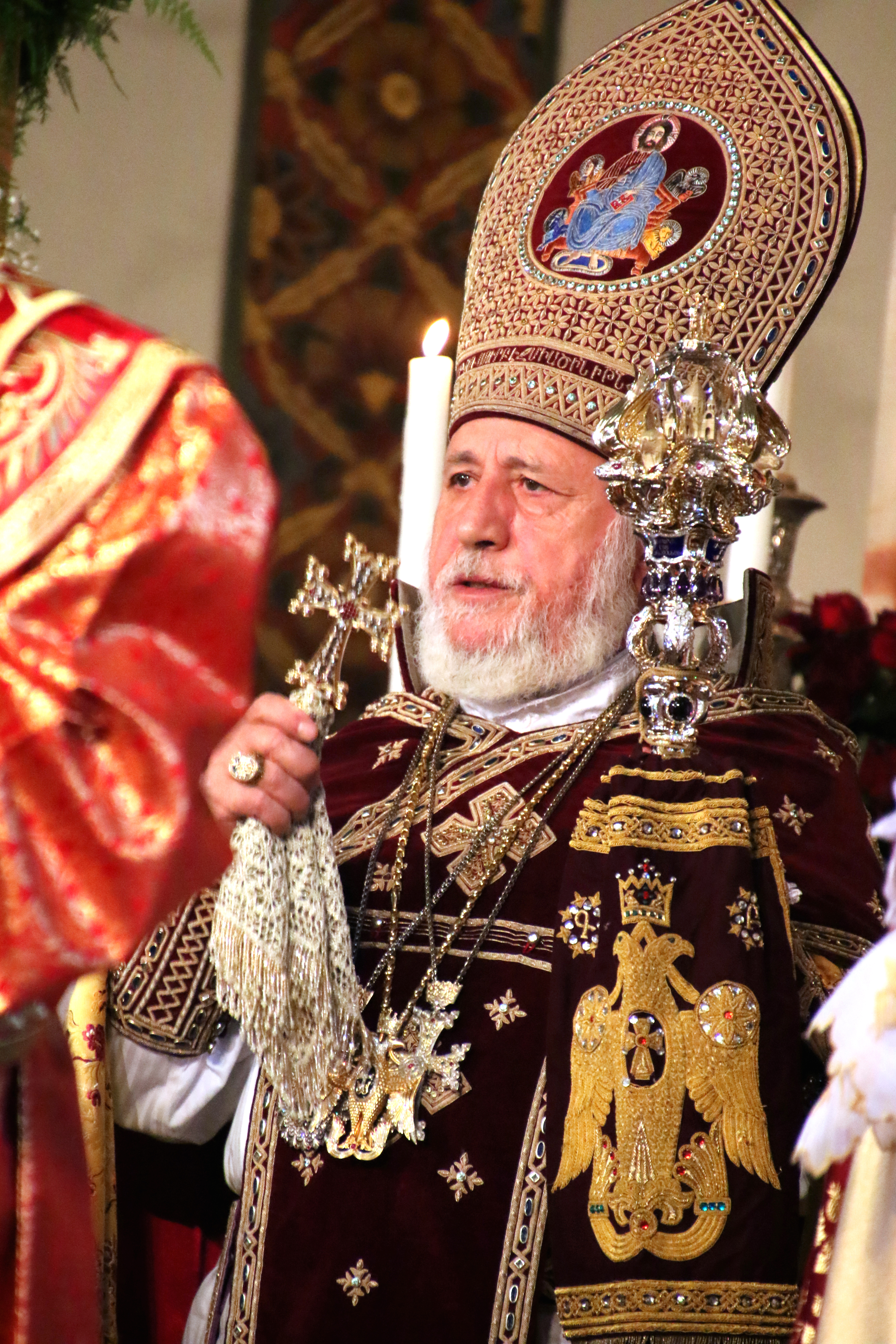
- Karekin II in 2019
- Native name: Գարեգին Բ
- Church: Armenian Apostolic Church
- See: Mother See of Holy Etchmiadzin
- Appointed: October 27, 1999
- Predecessor: Karekin I

Orders
- Ordination: 1972
- Consecration: 23 October 1983
- Rank: Catholicos-Patriarch

Personal details
- Born: Ktrij Nersessian; 21 August 1951 (age 75) Voskehat, Armenian SSR, Soviet Union
- Denomination: Armenian Apostolic
- Education: University of Vienna

Catholicos Garegin II (Armenian: Գարեգին Բ, also spelled Karekin; born 21 August 1951) is the Catholicos of All Armenians, the supreme head of the Armenian Apostolic Church, since 1999. In 2013 he was unanimously elected the Oriental Orthodox head of the World Council of Churches for the next eight years.

== Biography ==
Garegin II was born as Ktrij Nersessian in Voskehat, Armenia, on 21 August 1951. He entered the Gevorkian Theological Seminary at Echmiadzin in 1965 and graduated with honours in 1971. He was ordained to the diaconate in 1970. Later he became a monk and was ordained a priest in 1972. In the late 1970s the Catholicos of that period encouraged him to study outside of Armenia. This led to him continuing his studies in Vienna, Bonn University, and Zagorsk, Russia. On 23 October 1983, he was consecrated bishop at Echmiadzin. He became an archbishop in 1992.

Garegin II speaks fluent German from his time in Germany and Austria. In 1975 during his time in Cologne he was the spiritual representative of nine Armenian congregations in Germany.

In 1988 Garegin took an active role in helping his people overcome the Armenian earthquake. He oversaw the construction of a number of churches and schools in Armenia. He also showed an interest in using modern technology and telecommunications to help the life of his churches as well as dealing with the legacies of the Soviet era.

On 27 October 1999 he was elected the 132nd Catholicos of All Armenians at the Mother See of Holy Etchmiadzin, succeeding Karekin I. His relations with Pope John Paul II were generally positive. When the Pope visited Armenia in 2001, he stayed with the Catholicos.

In October 2007, he began a second visit to the United States. On 10 October 2007, he offered the opening prayer for the day's session of the United States House of Representatives.

His ecumenical trip to India to meet Baselios Thoma Didymos I, Catholicos of the East in November 2008, helped strengthen relations between the Armenian and Indian Orthodox churches.

The delegates to the 10th General Assembly of the World Council of Churches that took place in Busan, South Korea, on 4 November, unanimously elected Catholicos of All Armenians Garegin II, the supreme patriarch and head of the Armenian Apostolic Church, head of the organisation for the next eight years.

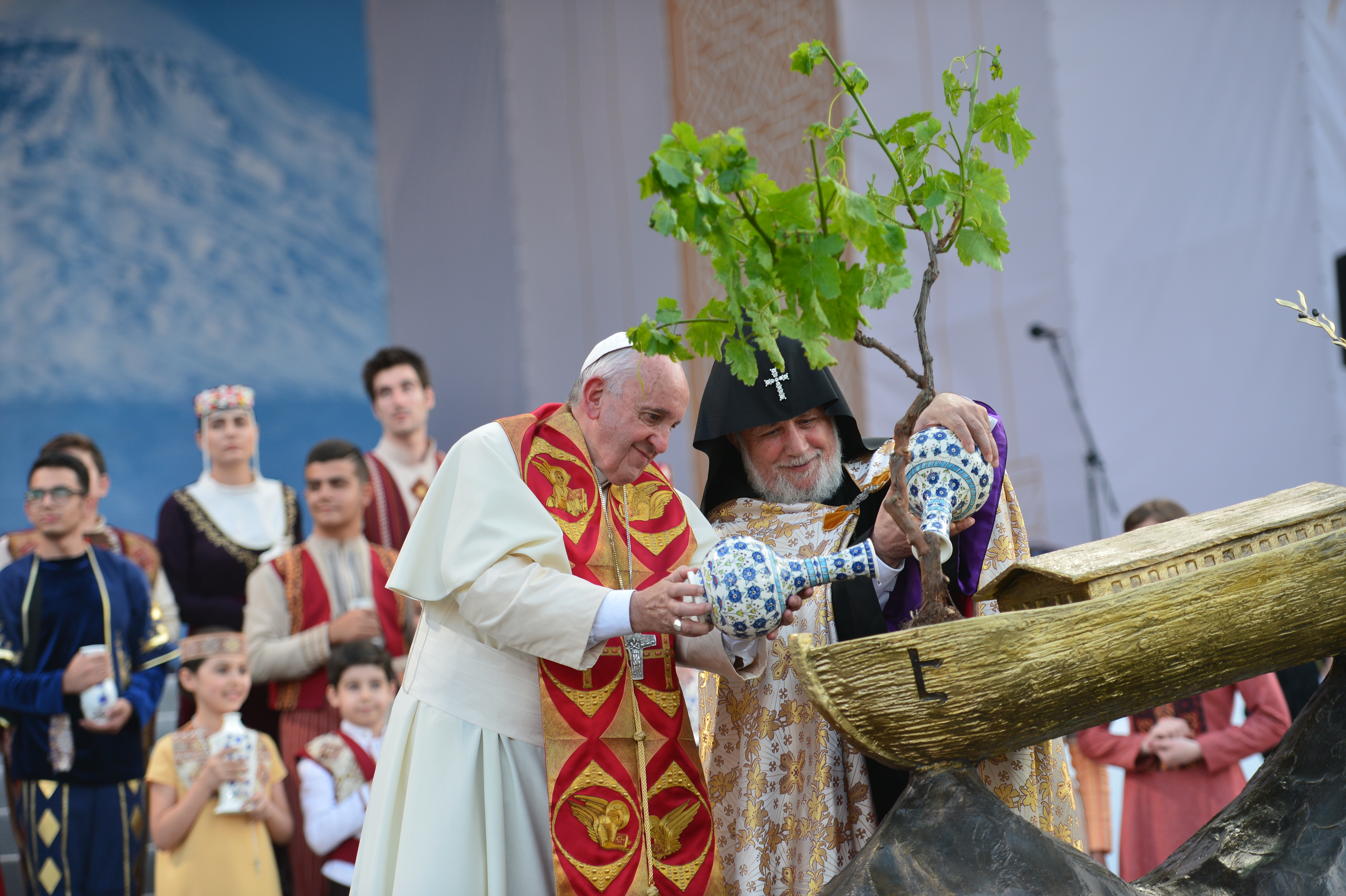
Pope Francis and Garegin II, at an ecumenic ceremony at the Republic Square, Yerevan, Armenia, in 2016

On 26 June 2016, Catholicos Garegin and Pope Francis signed a joint declaration on the family. It stated that the secularisation of society and its "alienation from the spiritual and divine" are damaging to the family, and affirmed that the Catholic and Armenian Apostolic churches share a marriage-based view of the family. The declaration also took note of various positive steps taken towards unity between the two leaders' churches, and "acknowledged the successful 'new phase' in relations" between them. It also lamented "immense tragedy" of the widespread persecution of Christians in the Middle East; the Pope and the Catholicos prayed "for a change of heart in all those who commit such crimes and those who are in a position to stop the violence".

== Political controversy ==
On 9 June 2025, Prime Minister Nikol Pashinyan alleged in a Facebook post that Garegin II had broken his vow of celibacy and had a child and must step down if unable to disprove the allegation. In the preceding days, Pashinyan had made several attacks on social media against senior clergymen, likewise accusing them of breaking their vows of celibacy. On June 10, Pashinyan announced the creation of a "coordinating council" to organize Garegin's removal and the election of a new catholicos. Garegin stated on June 11 that questions regarding the church and the clergy should be discussed by the appropriate bodies and called on people not to allow any actions that would threaten national unity.

By December 2025, four high-ranking clergy had been arrested and ten church leaders had called for Garegin II’s resignation. His brother and nephew had also been arrested.

In January 2026, the Prime Minister called for Garegin II’s resignation and reforms of the church. He also led a march in Yerevan in support of the government reforming the church and to stop it from being used against Armenia. In February 2026, Garegin II stated that the Armenian Apostolic Church was under attack, with clergy facing persecution and coercion.

== Criminal case ==
On 15 February 2026, the Armenian authorities opened a criminal case against Garegin II (officially accusing him of obstructing the enforcement of a court ruling) and restricted him from leaving the country; the church condemned the move as unlawful and politically motivated. This came one day before the church’s official synod meeting.

Garegin and six archbishops and bishops went on trial in Vagharshapat at the start of August 2026; their lawyers maintained that Armenian courts have no jurisdiction over internal church affairs, as the Armenian constitution guarantees the church’s independence and separation from the state. The original judge recused himself from the case, citing a conflict of interest; the second judge then ruled that the case should be moved to a court in Yerevan.

== Awards ==
- Order of the Star of Romania (Romania, 2000)
- Order of Bethlehem (Palestine, 2000)
- Legion of Honour (France, 2001)
- Order of Friendship (Russia, 2006)
- Order of the Star of Romania
- Order of Prince Yaroslav the Wise (Ukraine, 2001)
- Order of St. Thomas (Malankara Orthodox Syrian Church, 2008)
- Order of St. Mesrop Mashtots (Armenia, 2009)
- Order of Honour (Russia, 2022)
- Honorary member of the Armenian National Academy of Sciences

Oriental Orthodox titles
Preceded by Karekin I	Catholicos of the Holy See of St. Echmiadzin and All Armenians (1999–present)	Incumbent
