= Baselios Geevarghese I =

Catholicos of the East

His Holiness Moran Mar Baselios Geevarghese I Catholicos of the East
- Malankara Orthodox Syrian Church
- See: Apostolic Throne of St. Thomas
- Installed: 30 April 1925
- Term ended: 17 December 1928
- Predecessor: Baselios Paulose I
- Successor: Baselios Geevarghese II
- Previous posts: Metropolitan of Kottayam and Angamaly

Orders
- Ordination: 16 August 1896
- Consecration: 9 February 1913 by Ignatius Abdul Masih II

Personal details
- Born: Karuchira Geevarghese; 11 January 1870 Vakathanam
- Died: 17 December 1928 (aged 58)
- Buried: Vallikkattu Dayara, Vakathanam

Baselios Geevarghese I (born Geevarghese; 11 January 1870 – 17 December 1928) was the second Catholicos of the Malankara Orthodox Syrian Church. He was enthroned on 30 April 1925, succeeding Paulose I.

== Early life and Priesthood ==
Geevarghese was born to Karuchira Paulose Punnachan and Unnichiyamma in Vakathanam on 11 January 1870. In 1886, at the age of sixteen, he was ordained to the order of diaconate by Kadavil Paulose Mar Athanasius whom he served as his secretary. On 11 August 1896, Geevarghese was ordained as priest, and tonsured as hieromonk (ramban) a week later by Mar Athanasius.

On 9 February 1913, he was consecrated as Geevarghese Mar Philoxenos at Old Syrian Church, Chengannur alongside Karottuveettil Yuyakim Mar Ivanios, by Patriarch Ignatius Abded Mshiho II of Antioch, Catholicos Baselios Paulose II, Vattasseril Geevarghese Mar Dionysius, and Kallasseril Geevarghese Mar Gregorius (later Baselios Geevarghese II). Mar Philoxenos was subsequently appointed as the metropolitan of the Dioceses of Kottayam and Angamaly.

== Catholicos ==
After the See of the Catholicate remained vacant for about twelve years due to the unfavourable ecclesial atmosphere, the Malankara Association on 26 April 1925 elected Mar Philoxenos as Catholicos. He was enthroned as Catholicos of the East at St. Mary's Orthodox Syrian Church in Niranam on 30 April 1925, by Mar Dionysius, Mar Gregorius, and Mar Ivanios.

== Death ==
Following an appendectomy, Geevarghese I passed away on 17 December 1928 at Neyyoor. The funeral service led by Mar Dionysius took place on the next day, at Vallikkattu Dayara, Vakathanam.

Oriental Orthodox titles
Preceded by Baselios Paulose I 1912-1913	Catholicos of the East; 1925–1928	Succeeded by Baselios Geevarghese II; 1929-1964
