= Baselios Augen I =

Oriental Orthodox bishop (1884–1975)

His Holiness Moran Mor Baselios Augen I
- Catholicos of the East and Malankara Metropolitan
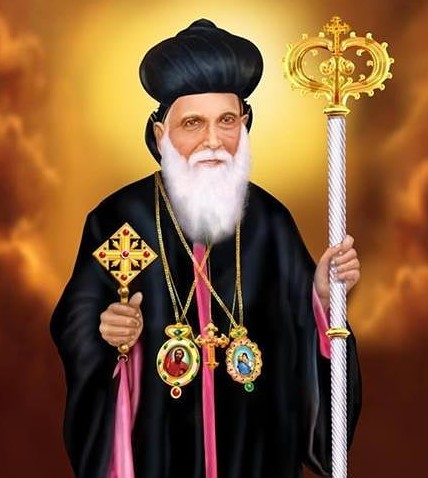
- Church: Syrian Orthodox Church of India
- See: Kottayam
- Installed: 22 May 1964
- Term ended: 24 September 1975
- Predecessor: Baselios Geevarghese II
- Successor: Baselios Marthoma Mathews I (in Orthodox Lineage); Baselios Paulose II (in Jacobite Lineage)

Orders
- Ordination: 1908 by Sleeba Osthathios
- Consecration: 15 May 1927 by Ignatius Elias III

Personal details
- Born: 26 June 1884 Perumbavoor, Kerala, India
- Died: 8 December 1975 (aged 91) Kottayam, Kerala, India
- Buried: Catholicate Palace, Devalokam, Kottayam, Kerala, India

Baselios Augen I (26 June 1884 – 3 December 1975) was the 17th Malankara Metropolitan, the fourth Catholicos of the East in the Orthodox Syrian Church of India. He was the first Catholicos consecrated in a reunified Malankara Church, by Ignatius Jacob III, the Patriarch of Antioch, in 1964 but his tenure saw a second split in the church.

== Early days and education ==
He was born on 26 June 1884 at Puthencruz, Ernakulam district of the Indian state of Kerala to Thuruthy Chettakulathinkara Abraham Malpan and Annamma of Cheruvillil Valiyal in a Malankara Orthodox Syrian Church family. His father was a scholar of Syriac language. When he was baptized by Metropolitan Paulos Ivanios, he was named Mathai by the Metropolitan. Ivanios was the Syriac teacher and mentor of his father. Young Mathai had his primary education at Puthencruz while staying at the home of his mother's family. At a very young age, he had accepted the discipleship of Malankara Malpan (Teacher of the Church) V. Rev. Mathen Cor-Episcopa of Konatt and had his theological education from Pampakuda Seminary. He was ordained as sub-deacon by Kadavil Paulose Mar Athanasius Metropolitan. Mathai joined M.D. Seminary School, Kottayam and learned English language.

=== In the Middle East ===
In those days, Mathai met Dn. Sleeba from Syria (later Sleeba Osthathios Metropolitan). Together they visited almost every Church in Malankara. Mathai used to translate the Syriac speeches of Sleeba. Mathai left for Syria with Sleeba in 1905, and was ordained Deacon at Mar Mathai Dayaro (St. Mathew's Monastery) in Assyria. During his stay at the oldest monastery of Mar Augen in Tur-Abdin, Mathai adopted the name Augen. He stayed for a few days with the Patriarch of Antioch, Ignatius Abdul Masih II, at the monastery of Mar Abraham in Tur-Abdin. Then he travelled to Mardin and reached Kurkuma Dayara where he stayed for about nine months and studied several rare books in Syriac. In 1908 he was elevated to the monastic order of Ramban by Patriarch Ignatius Abdulla at St. Mark's Syrian Orthodox Monastery in Jerusalem.

While staying at Tur-Abdin, Augen Ramban corresponded with some of the leaders in Malankara. He provided the information about the deposed Patriarch Ignatius Abdul Masih II to the Metropolitan Vattasseril Dionysius.

=== Return to India and Ordination ===
On his return to Malankara, Augen Ramban was ordained to priesthood by Metropolitan Sleeba Osthathios at Kottayam Cheriya Palli (an ancient Church in Kottayam). In 1909, Fr. Augen Ramban accompanied Patriarch Abdulla and Metropolitan Osthathios to the churches they visited, to translate their speeches. He was impartial in the factional disputes in the Malankara Church. When Patriarch Ignatius Abdul Masih II arrived in Malankara in 1912, Fr. Augen visited him at St. Mary's Church, Niranam and held an audience with the Patriarch. There he also attended the enthronement ceremony of Metropolitan Paulos Ivanios as the Catholicos of the East Baselios Paulos I. Later he left for Madras to serve the faithful and conduct Holy Mass there.

He was consecrated as Metropolitan by name Thimotheos on 15 May 1927 at Jerusalem by the Patriarch of Antioch and all the East, Ignatius Elias III. Patriarch appointed him as the fourth Metropolitan of Kandanad.

In the late 1930s he left that faction and joined the faction of Malankara Church which submitted to the authority of the Catholicos of the East. He later became the Principal of the Orthodox Theological Seminary (Old Seminary), Kottayam and also held charges of the Kandanad and Thumpamon dioceses.

== Catholicos of the East and Malankara Metropolitan (1964–75) ==
After the Supreme court order in 1958 which ended the half-a-century long litigations, the two factions of Malankara Church re-united as the Malankara Orthodox Syrian Church as part of the Syrian Orthodox Church, under the 1934 Constitution.

When the re-unified Malankara Association met at Niranam on 17 May 1962, Augen Thimotheos was elected as the successor-designate to the Catholicos of the East Baselios Geevarghese II. Following the demise of Geevarghese II, Thimotheos took charge as the Malankara Metropolitan. On 22 May 1964, Thimotheos was installed formally as Catholicos Baselios Augen I by the Supreme Head of Church Patriarch of Antioch Ignatius Ya`qub III who had arrived in response to the invitation of the Malankara Synod. The ceremony was held at M.D. Seminary Chapel, Kottayam.

In his speech during the enthronement, the Patriarch told the multitude gathered to witness the occasion:

You must conserve the peace established in Malankara very firmly. That would be your precious present for me. Moreover you must lead a holy spiritual life. There will not be any use to the Church or for anybody to talk about or make quarrel on the basis of the rifts which existed in the Malankara Church. If somebody is trying to create problems based on the previous unpleasant events, they will have the fate of the wife of Lot.

On 20 November 1964, it was decided to consecrate a few more Bishops, considering the progress of the Church.

=== Visit of Pope Paul VI ===
Pope Paul VI used to visit the Heads of Churches of each country he visited. On his visit to India to attend the Eucharistic Congress in Bombay, the Pope expressed his wish to exchange greetings with the Supreme Head of the Malankara Orthodox Syriac Church, Augen I Catholicos. Owing to his tight schedule, the Pope was unable to travel from Bombay to Kerala and asked the Catholicos whether it would be convenient for the Catholicos to visit him at Bombay. Augen I agreed, and the meeting took place on 3 December 1964 at 9.00 am. During the meeting in a specially arranged room in the Palace of the Catholic Archbishop of Bombay, only Fr. K. Philipose (later Philipose Theophilos Metropolitan) and the Archbishop Valarian Gracious were present. The primates embraced and sat together. The Catholicos informed that his trip to Bombay was with the sole purpose of meeting the Pope. The Pope invited the Catholicos to visit Rome as his guest. The Pope also expressed his desire to visit Kerala and meet the ancient Christian community there. Fr. K. Philipose read out the 433-worded message of Augen I to Paul VI and submitted it to the Pope. The Pope replied in 470 words, saying that he enjoyed the fact that India was lucky enough to listen to the Gospel at the same time as Europe.

=== Addis Ababa conference ===
In January 1965, 81-year-old Augen I attended the Synod of Oriental Orthodox Churches at Addis Ababa, Ethiopia. The Synod was convened by the Emperor of Ethiopia Haile Selassie. Along with the other Oriental Orthodox Primates, the Patriarch of Antioch Ya'qub III was also present on the occasion. The Catholicos was accompanied by the Secretary of Malankara Episcopal Synod Daniel Philexinos, Fr. T. C. Jacob, Fr. Dr. V. C. Samuel and Fr. Dr. K. C. Joseph. Catholicos Geevarghese II had expressed the desire for convening such a conference for the first time.

The conference began on 15 January. Patriarch Ya'qub II, Armenian Supreme Catholicos Vazken I, Catholicos Augen I, Catholicos of Cilicia Khoren and Abune Theophilos (then deputy of the Patriarch of Ethiopia) were seated on both sides of the Emperor on the dais. The emperor inaugurated the function. From 18 January onwards, several important decisions were taken at the Conference with regard to Orthodoxy.

On 25 January, Augen I along with the Indian delegation reached Cairo as the guests of the Coptic Orthodox Church and visited the important Churches and places there. Two days later, they went to Jerusalem. After visiting Beirut and Antelias (the seat of the Catholicos of Cilicia), the party reached Damascus on 3 February. The Patriarch Ignatius Ya'qub III gave a warm reception to the Catholicos and the members of the Indian delegation. After holding friendly dialogue with the Patriarch, the Catholicos visited Homs, Aleppo, Hesakka, Derik and Mosul.

=== Relics of Apostle St. Thomas ===
At Mosul, the Patriarch Ignatius Ya'qub III and Metropolitan Severios Zakka received the party and took them to the Headquarters of the Mosul Metropolitan as a procession. When renovation works for a wall of the Church at Mosul (named after Apostle St. Thomas) was carried out, the Holy relics of Apostle St. Thomas were regained. The relics were kept safely in a marble box with and old Estrangela inscription which said that it contained the holy relics of the founder of the Indian Church. The Patriarch considered the relics as a suitable present to the Indian Church signifying the re-established peace in the Church, and a witness of the Apostle's evangelisation in India. Augen I celebrated the Divine Liturgy at that Church. Amidst the Divine Liturgy, the Patriarch placed the holy relics on a specially decorated place in the chancel, and presented them to Augen I. After a grand procession, the Divine Liturgy was concluded.

The Catholicos and the delegation then visited Baghdad, Basra, Bahrain, Qatar and the Malankara Syriac Orthodox Congregations there, and then returned to India. The holy relic of St. Thomas is kept at the Catholicate Palace, Devalokam, Kottayam.

=== Consecrations and important declarations ===
By the end of March 1966, Augen declared Mar Elia Chapel, Kottayam as the official Thronal Cathedral of the Catholicos of the East.

On 24 August 1966, Augen I elevated Yuhanon Severios, Thomas Thimotheos and Dr. Philipose Theophilos as Metropolitans at Kolencherry St. Peter's & St. Paul's Church. These newly consecrated Metropolitans were appointed to lead the Dioceses of Cochin, Malabar and Angamaly respectively.

As Catholicos of the East, Augen I consecrated the Holy Mooron (anointing oil) at the Old Seminary, Kottayam on 21 December 1967.

=== Second rift of the Malankara Syrian Church ===
By the early 1970s, there was a second rift in the Malankara Syrian Church and factional feud re-emerged. Augen I's use of the title "Throne of St. Thomas the Apostle", affirmed in the proceedings of the pan-Orthodox Council of Addis Ababa in 1965, was objected to by Pat. Yakub III. The 1975 Syriac Orthodox Synod presided by the Patriarch of Antioch, deposed Augen I. The supporters of the Syriac Synod, accepted the authority of the newly installed Catholicos Baselios Paulose II as the second Catholicos of the East in India. Supporters of Augen I elected Baselios Mathews l as the 5th Catholicose of Malankara Orthodox Syrian Church, after his retirement.

== Syriac scholarship ==
Having stayed at the various Syrian Orthodox monasteries in Turkey and Syria, he came in contact with various Syriac scholars which helped him to master the Syriac Church language. With his mastery of the Malayalam, Sanskrit and Syriac languages, he composed the 'Pemkisa (Fenqitho) Namaskaram' in Syriac for the feasts of St.Mary and St. Gregorios of Parumala and translated them into Malayalam. His major translations from Syriac are 'Prumiyonukal', ' Valiya Nombilae Namaskaram', 'Pattamkoda Shushrusha Kramangal' and 'Pallikoodasha Kramangal'. He also composed the 'Hoothomo' for 'Holy Synods' and the 'State after death'.

== Retirement and death ==
Due to ill health from old age, Baselios Augen I relinquished the throne on 24 September 1975 and Baselios Marthoma Mathews I was installed as the Catholicos.

Two months later, on 8 December 1975, Baselios Augen I died and was buried at the Catholicate Palace, Devalokam, Kottayam. The Church celebrates the memorial feast of the Catholicos on 8 December.

== See also ==
- Catholicos of the East and Malankara Metropolitan
- List of Catholicos of the East

Oriental Orthodox titles
Preceded by Baselios Geevarghese II; 1929-1964	Catholicos of the East and Malankara Metropolitan; Malankara Orthodox Syrian Church; 1964–1975	Succeeded by Baselios Marthoma Mathews I 1975-1991
