= Harry Nadjarian =

Harry Nadjarian is the founder of Industrial Motor Parts, now known as Industrial Motor Power Corporation.

Nadjarian was born in Beirut into a Lebanese-Armenian family. He immigrated to the United States following the start of the Lebanese civil war in 1975.

Nadjarian is founder and Chairman of the Board of Industrial Motor Power Corporation (IMP).

Nadjarian is the recipient of the Ellis Island Medal of Honor, California Representative at Statue of Liberty Centennial Celebration, House of Lebanon’s Pride of Heritage Award, and the Prince of Cilicia Medal which was presented to him by Catholicos Aram I.
