= Geevarghese Osthathios =

Indian Orthodox bishop (1918–2012)

H.G.Dr. Geevarghese Mar Osthathios
- Senior Metropolitan of Indian Orthodox Church
- Church: Indian Orthodox Church
- Diocese: Niranam, Kerala
- Installed: 1 April 1975
- Predecessor: Thoma Mar Dionysius
- Successor: Yuhanon Mar Chrysostomos

Orders
- Consecration: 16 February 1975

Personal details
- Born: 9 December 1918 Mavelikkara
- Died: 16 February 2012 (aged 93) St. Gregorios Hospital, Parumala, Kerala.
- Denomination: Indian Orthodox Church
- Parents: Kochitty and Mariamma

Geevarghese Mar Osthathios (9 December 1918 – 16 February 2012) was a senior bishop of the Indian Orthodox Church. He was the metropolitan of the Niranam diocese from1975–2007. He was a theologian, orator and writer.

== Childhood and Education ==
He was born on 9 December 1918, to Kochitty and Mariamma Kochitty of Mundolil family in Mavelikara. He obtained his B.D from Leonard Theological College, Jabalpur, M.A from Drew University in Madison, New Jersey and his S.T.M (Masters of Sacred Theology) from Union Seminary, New York.

== Priesthood ==
He received the order of Korooyo (reader) from Metropolitan Augen Mar Timotheos on 9 August 1947 and his priesthood from Baselios Geevarghese II, Catholicos on 10 May 1956. He was nominated to the post of Metropolitan by the Malankara Association which met at Niranam on 2 October 1974. Metropolitan Daniel Mar Philexinos ordained him as a Ramban, at St. Mary's Cathedral Puthencavu. He was consecrated as a bishop by Baselios Augen I, Catholicos of the East on 16 February 1975, at Niranam Valiya Palli. He was appointed as the Metropolitan of the Niranam Diocese on 1 April 1975. He died on 16 February 2012.

== Other positions ==
He was the member of Faith and Order Commission of the World Council of Churches. He was a faculty member of the Orthodox Theological Seminary, Kottayam. His knowledge in Old Testament and way of interpreting the theological aspects on Holy Trinity is worth mentioning. President of the Mission Board of the Indian Orthodox Church and the Director of St. Paul's Mission Training Centre, Mavelikara. He is the founder of a good number of charitable programmes, mission centers and institutions which include Marriage Assistance Foundation, Sick Aid Foundation, Save A Heart Foundation, House Building Aid Fund, Mission Training Centre, M.G.D Ashram Balabhavan Karunagiri, St. Paul's Asram Puthuppady, Haripad Mission Centre, Yacharam St. Gregorios Balagram, Bethanya Bhavan, St. George Balikagram Pune, etc.

== Distinctions ==
=== Orders ===
In September 1967, while visiting Russian Orthodox Church as part of a delegation from Malankara Orthodox Church, he was awarded the Order of Saint Vladimir by Patriarch Alexy I of Moscow.

== Publications ==
1. Theology of a Classless Society ISBN 978-0-7188-2415-0
2. Sharing God and a sharing world ISBN 81-7214-253-6
3. The sin of being rich in a poor world: Holy Trinity and social justice
