= Baselios Marthoma Mathews I =

His Holiness Moran Mor Baselios Marthoma Mathews I Catholicos of the East and Malankara Metropolitan
- Malankara Orthodox Syrian Church
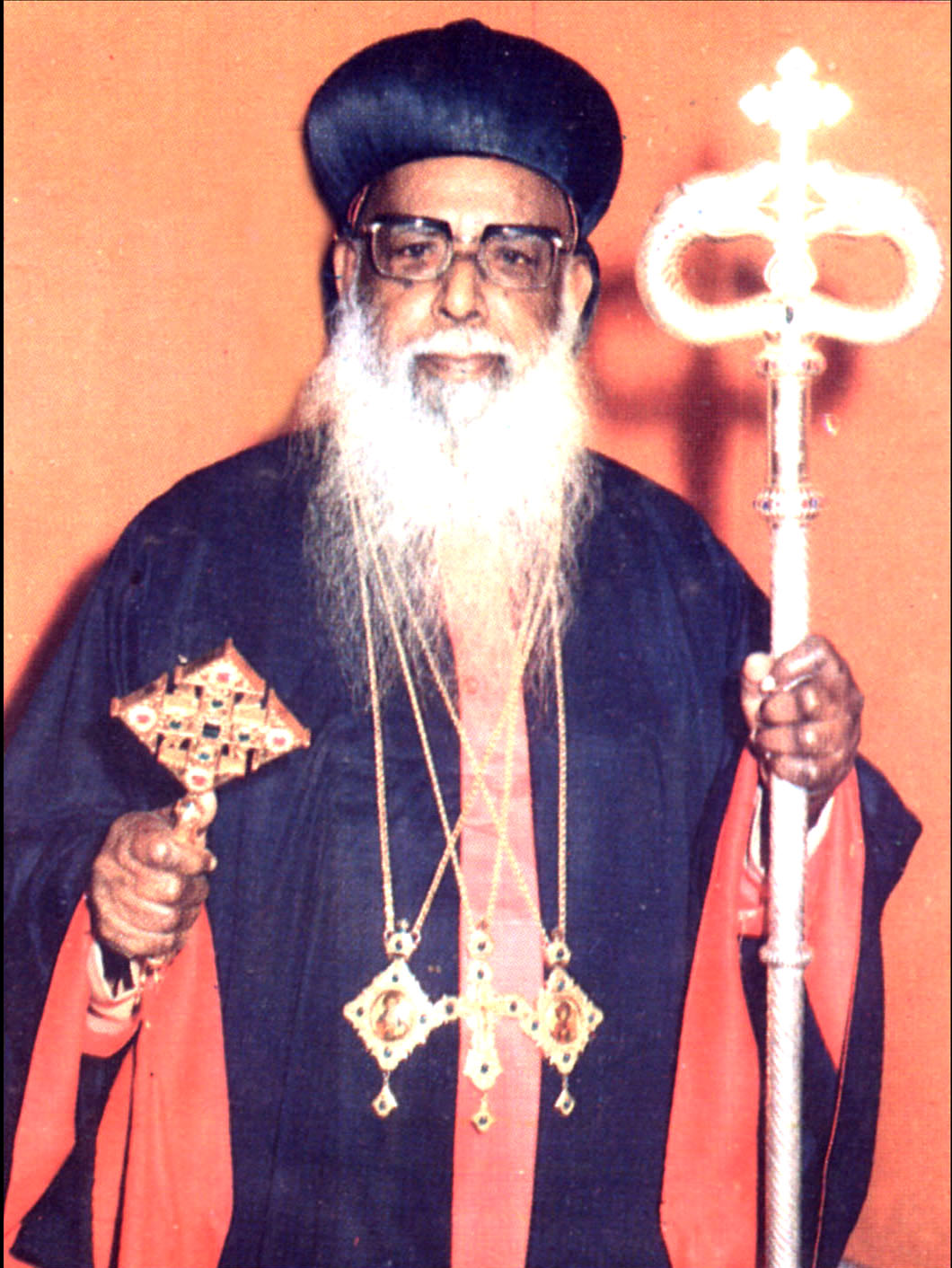
- Church: Malankara Orthodox Syrian Church
- See: Catholicos of the East
- Installed: 27 October 1975
- Term ended: 27 April 1991
- Predecessor: Baselios Augen I
- Successor: Baselios Marthoma Mathews II
- Previous post: Metropolitan of Diocese Outside Kerala

Orders
- Ordination: 27 October 1946 Old Seminary
- Consecration: 15 May 1953 by Baselios Geevarghese II
- Rank: Catholicos

Personal details
- Born: V.K. Mathew; 27 March 1907 Kottayam
- Died: 8 November 1996 (aged 89) Devalokam, Kottayam
- Buried: Catholicate Palace, Devalokam, Kottayam

Baselios Marthoma Mathews I (27 March 1907 – 8 November 1996) was the primate of Malankara Orthodox Syrian Church, also known as Indian Orthodox Church. He was the 5th catholicos of the Malankara Orthodox Syrian Church and 18th Malankara Metropolitan.

== Early life ==
He was the youngest son of Rev. Vattakunnel Kurien Kathanar and Pulickaparampil Mariamma in Kottayam. His father was Vicar of St. Mary's syriac orthodox Church at Manarcad. In his early days, the catholicos was called V.K. Mathew and nicknamed Kuttachen.

== Education ==
Mathew had his school education at M.D. Seminary High School, and collegiate education in C.M.S. College, Kottayam, and Maharaja's College Ernakulam. After obtaining a Bachelor of Science degree in chemistry, Mathews opted for the ministry of God and joined the Bishop's College, Calcutta, for a Bachelor of Theology degree in 1936. After obtaining his degree in 1942, he joined the teaching staff of the Orthodox Theological Seminary, Kottayam.

== Orders ==
=== Priesthood ===
On 27 October 1946, V.K. Mathew at the age of 39, received ordination of priesthood from Catholicos Mar Geevarghese II, at Old Seminary. The theological seminary was his main field of activity, and was appointed as its acting principal in 1948 and as its principal in 1951, which position he retained until 1966.

=== Metropolitan (1953–1975) ===
The Malankara Syrian Christian Association held in 1951 elected Fr. Mathews as metropolitan-candidate and accordingly on 15 May 1953, the Catholicos Mar Geevarghese along with other metropolitans of the synod, consecrated him as Metropolitan Mar Athanasius at Mar Elia Chapel, Kottayam. In addition to the post of principal of the theological seminary, he was in charge of the diocese of Outside Kerala from 1960 to 1976. During this period the diocese grew significantly. The metropolitan made several tours to different parts of the diocese.

In July 1963, at the invitation of Russian Orthodox Church, Mar Athanasius and Daniel Mar Philexinos visited Moscow and attended the golden jubilee celebration of the metropolitan consecration of Alexy I Patriarch as the representatives of the Catholicos of the East.

On 31 December 1970 Mar Athanasius was elected as successor to Baselios Augen I as Catholicos and Malankara metropolitan by the Malankara Association. Consequently, the Metropolitan was called upon to assist the Catholicos in the administration of the Church from 1972 on wards.

=== Malankara Metropolitan and Catholicos ===
On 24 September 1975, Mar Athanasius assumed the charge of Malankara metropolitan with the approval of the Synod, when Baselios Augen I voluntarily relinquished charge of that office.

Mar Athanasius was installed by the Holy Synod as Catholicos Mar Thoma Mathews I on the apostolic throne of St. Thomas of the East in a ceremonial function held on Monday, 27 October 1975 at the Old Seminary. He was 68 years old. The installation service was conducted by the Episcopal Synod. Daniel Mar Philoxinos, secretary to the synod, was the chief celebrant of the service.

He was installed as Catholicos of the East on the Apostolic throne of St. Thomas on 27 October 1975, succeeding Mar Baselios Augen. The catholicos is 88th in succession and the fifth after the re-establishment of the catholicate in India.

== Legacy ==
=== Title Marthoma ===
The title affixed to the Catholicos is Baselios Marthoma Mathews I. While 'Baselios' has been the traditional formal title of all Catholicoi taken after the great scholar and theologian Mar Baselios of Cappadocia, 'Mar Thoma' was suffixed to imply the lineage of Malankara Metropolitans, in which Mathews I came 18th. The term 'Mar Thoma' has a historical significance. Following the Coonen Cross Oath of 1653, the Malankara Metropolitan took the title 'Mar Thoma' signifying and following the St. Thomas tradition of the Church. Nine Malankara metropolitan, who ruled the Church from 1653 to 1816, bore the title Marthtoma. This title, however, came to be dropped following the intervention of the Church of Syria from the times of Mar Thoma VI (I 765). Mar Thoma VI accepted the title Mar Dionysius (I) in certain exigent situation of dependence on them. Mar Thoma VII, VIII and IX, however, had not used the title. But later on, traditional Greek names like Dionysius, Athanasius, which were commonly used in the Eastern Church including the Church in Syria came into regular use in the Malankara Church since the time of Metropolitan Pulikottil Mar Joseph Dionysius II (1816). Nevertheless, the Church recaptured the spirit of national independence and affixed the 'Mar Thoma' title to the Catholicos when Mathews I was installed as the Primate of the Church

=== Administration ===
Mathews I made himself available to the entire Church. While he was in office, the present system of holding the Holy Episcopal Synod at least twice a year at fixed periods and with proper agendas came into effect.

==== Seminary ====
Mathews I wished the Malankara Church to be known as Indian Orthodox Church, and worked to preserve its independence. During his time the Orthodox Theological Seminary at Kottayam was affiliated to the Serampur University, Calcutta and the seminary was upgraded as a degree college. He wanted the Theological College to be made an independent university for Theology.

==== Consecration of Holy Myron ====
He consecrated holy Myron, a very rare function, on 1 April 1977 at Old Seminary Chapel, Kottayam and on 25 March 1988 at Devalokam Catholicate Chappel.

==== Consecration of bishops ====
He consecrated 10 bishops (Metropolitans), five at Pazhanji Church on 15 May 1978 and at Puthiacav St Mary's Church, Mavelikara on 15 May 1985.

==== Contributions ====
Mathews I was an authority on Church Canons, Constitution and history. He was closely associated with the lawsuits related to factional disputes within the Church when he was a layman and he sought advice on such matters from experts in the field during this time, especially from his elder brother Cherian Vattakunnel. As an unmatched authority on Church Canons, he was able to strengthen the autonomy and continue the autocephaly of the Church unchallenged.

He translated and published several works so they were available to all in Malayalam, English, Tamil, and Hindi, and celebrated the Qurbana (Divine Liturgy) in English for the diaspora.

For the conservation of rare books and records he started the Malankara Orthodox Archives. School of Liturgical Music was also started at the Seminary with the aim of preserving and teaching sacred music. He was a good exponent of "Eccara", the canonical songs. He was very concerned to preserve the Beth Gazo. For the Theological education of the Elderly he started a course by the name "Divya Bodhanam" which has become very popular now.

==== Awards ====
He was awarded The Order of St. Valdimer by the Patriarch of Russia and made a Fellow of the Leningrad Theological Seminary. He was decorated with The Order of St. George of the First Degree by the Georgian Catholicose-Patriarch Ilia II on 30 August 1982 'for proacting and strengthening the fraternal ties between Georgian and Indian Churches'. Serampur University conferred a Doctorate Degree (Honoris Causa) on him.

==== Catholicate Platinum Jubilee Celebrations ====
The 70th year of the establishment of the Catholicate was celebrated with great pomp and glory in 1982. The celebratory meeting held at Kottayam Nehru Stadium on 12 September 1982 had HE Gyani Zail Singh, President of India, as the chief guest. Dignitaries from several Churches around the world were present at the meeting including Catholicos of All Armenians Vazgen I and Catholicos-Patriarch of All Georgia Ilia II. Dr. P. C. Alexander, Principal Secretary to the Prime Minister of India and Union Minister C. M. Stephen were among the guests at this immense meeting. HG Dr. Paulos Mar Gregorios, Catholicos Designate Mathews Mar Coorilos, Governor of Andhra Pradesh K. C. Abraham, HG Michael Bosco Duraisamy of Salem representing the Pope of Rome, Metropolitan HG Emilianos representing the Ecumenical Patriarch of Constantinople, Metropolitan HG Nathaniel of Ethiopian Orthodox Church, Metropolitan HG Vladimir of Russian Orthodox Church, Metropolitan HG Sairadhariar of Armenian Orthodox Church, Metropolitan HG Nestor of Romanian Orthodox Church, Bishop HG Josif Velichki of Bulgarian Orthodox Church, Bishop Ambrosius of Finland, Kerala state minister R. Balakrishna Pillai and Chief Editor of Malayala Manorama Mr. K. M. Mathew were also present on the occasion.

==== Order of St. Thomas ====
During his reign, Mathews I instated the Order of St. Thomas, which is the highest honorary award given by the Indian Orthodox Church. The first recipient of the award was HE Gyani Zail Singh, the President of India at the Catholicate Platinum Jubilee Celebratory meeting in 1982.

==== Ecumenical Relations ====
Mathews I had close ties with several Orthodox primates. A number of Patriarchs, Catholicoi and Metropolitans from sister Orthodox Churches visited India during his reign. He also visited several foreign countries as the guest of Orthodox primates. On 8 February 1986, Pope John Paul II visited Catholicos Mathews I at Mar Elia Cathedral, Kottayam.

== Death ==
On 27 April 1991, Mathews I relinquished the Titles of The Catholicos and Malankara Metropolitan of Malankara Orthodox Syrian Church due to old age. He died on 8 November 1996 and was buried at the Catholicate Palace, Devalokam, Kottayam.

Oriental Orthodox titles
Preceded by Baselios Augen I 1964-1975	Catholicos of the East and Malankara Metropolitan; 1975–1991	Succeeded by Baselios Marthoma Mathews II; 1991-2005
