= Ignatius Abdullah II =

118th Patriarch of Syriac Orthodox Church of Antioch (1906 - 1915)

- Syriac Orthodox Patriarch of Antioch and All the East
- Church: Syriac Orthodox Church
- See: Antioch
- Installed: 1906
- Term ended: 1915
- Predecessor: Ignatius Abdulmasih II
- Successor: Ignatius Elias III

Personal details
- Born: Abdullah Sattuf; June 7, 1833 Sadad, Syria Vilayet, Ottoman Empire
- Died: November 26, 1915 (aged 82) Jerusalem, Mutasarrifate of Jerusalem, Ottoman Empire
- Residence: Monastery of Saint Mark, Jerusalem

Ignatius Abdullah II (Syriac: ܐܝܓܢܛܝܘܣ ܥܒܕ ܕܐܠܘܗܘ) also Ignatius Abdullah II Stephan (June 7, 1833 – November 26, 1915) was the Patriarch of Antioch, and head of the Syriac Orthodox Church from 1906 until his death in 1915.

== Biography ==
Abdullah was born on June 7, 1833, in the village of Sadad, a predominantly Syriac Orthodox village, south of Homs. He became a monk at an early age, and was later ordained priest. In 1870, he toured the Tur Abdin region and recorded the names of villages, monasteries, churches, clergy and the families living in the area.

He was appointed bishop of Jerusalem in 1872 by Patriarch Ignatius Peter IV, taking the name Gregorios, and in August 1874 accompanied him to Britain to persuade the British government to assist the church in India. They stayed here until April 1875, when they left for India to reorganise the church in India with the help of the British governor. Whilst in India, Abdullah fraternised with Protestant missionaries. After returning to Syria he spread Protestant ideas.

They left India in May 1877 and remained in Syria before returning to London in 1879, where he secured a printing press for the Monastery of Mor Hananyo. Upon his return, Abdullah was ordained Metropolitan of Syria and left to attend the 1888 Lambeth Conference, and secured a second printing press.

After the death of Ignatius Peter IV in 1894, a rivalry began between Abdullah and Abdulmasih to be elected to the patriarchal throne. According to American missionaries operating in Syria at the time, the Ottoman government interfered and intimidated bishops based on the highest bidder. However, in 1895, Abdulmasih was elected and consecrated patriarch.

The following year, in 1896, Abdullah joined the Syriac Catholic Church. He was a Syriac Catholic for 9 years and had participated in the synod that elected Ephrem Rahmani as the Patriarch of Antioch. In 1905, Abdullah renounced the church and took up his position as Syriac Orthodox Metropolitan of Amid again, under the promise of becoming the Patriarch upon its vacancy.

== Patriarch of Antioch ==
The Patriarch, Ignatius Abdul Masih II, was deposed in 1903 by the Ottoman government, and Metropolitan Abdullah was elected as new Patriarch of Antioch as Ignatius Abdullah II effective 1906. The circumstances of how Patriarch Ignatius Abdulmasih II was deposed and why is highly controversial within the Syriac Orthodox church. Supporters of Abdullah claim the patriarch Abdulmasih had converted to Catholicism and was excommunicated by the Holy Synod as a result. Some others claimed that the Patriarch had developed serious drinking problems particularly after the 1895 Massacres of Diyarbakir that his indigent Ottoman Sultan took him to visit the seen of his disciples are beheaded and raped, then forcefully fed with booze and opium through a funnel placed in his mouth while retaining him in a pole, then they left him near a Christian village mounting him in a donkey to intimidate his followers, so that his own people will think bad about him and that's why a number of Syriac bishops demanded he be deposed. Whereas supporters of Abdulmasih claim Abdullah bribed the Ottoman Government to issue a firman deposing Abdulmasih as Patriarch and that he was not excommunicated by the Holy Synod. Supporters of Abdulmasih claimed that Abdullah claimed the patriarchal throne by paying £500 to secure his election and was enthroned on August 15, 1906, as an exception that he was never been a Maphrian and left for London shortly after.

Whilst in London, Abdullah met with King Edward VII twice and received a medal. He travelled to India in 1908 and began ordaining Indian bishops much to the chagrin of the local church. This led to the demand of a Maphrian or Catholicos to prevent the Malankara Church coming under Abdullah's control. In 1910, Abdullah established the Knanaya (Autonomous Archdioceses) and consecrated Geevarghese Mor Severios on August 28, 1910. In 1912, the dispute over authority between supporters of the Metropolitan of Malankara and supporters of the Patriarch finally divided the Malankara Church into two rival factions. The patriarch excommunicated Dionysios Giwargis Vattasseril, the metropolitan of Malankara, and appointed Pawlos Kurillos Kochuparambil in his stead. Vattasseril sought help from Ignatius Abdulmasih, who visited India and established a maphrianate for the Malankara Church at his insistence. This resulted in a full-fledged schism in the Indian Syriac Orthodox Church with the supporters of the metropolitan becoming the essentially independent Malankara Orthodox Syrian Church headed by the Catholicos of the East and the supporters of Patriarch Abdullah II maintaining ties with the Patriarch of Antioch as the Malankara Jacobite Syrian Christian Church. Motions by the church leaders and two Supreme Court decisions in the 20th century failed to heal the rift.

He also travelled to Jerusalem in 1912.

Abdullah resided at the Monastery of Saint Mark from March 17, 1912, until his death on November 26, 1915, where he was also buried.

== Episcopal succession ==
During Ignatius Elias time as Patriarch and Metropolitan, he had the duty to ordain and consecrate many Metropolitans in the Syria Orthodox church in addition to hundreds of priests, monks, and deacons. The list includes one future patriarch also

1. Iyawannis Elias (1908-1912). Metropolitan of Diyarbakir and later Metropolitan of Mosul (1912-1916). Later, he was elected as Ignatius Elias III, the 119th Patriarch of Syriac Orthodox Church (1917-1932).
2. Dionysios VI Giwargis Vattasseril (1908-1912), Metropolitan of Malankara
3. Pawlos Kurillos Kochuparambil (1908-1917), bishop for India
4. Giwargis Severios Edavazhikkal, bishop of the newly founded Knanaya Jacobite Diocese
5. Phlixinous Abdulahad (1908-1915). Metropolitan of Monastery of Mor Augin in Tur-Abdin
6. Julius Ibraheem (1908). Bishop for Syria
7. Severus Samu'il (1908-1926). Bishop for Monastery of Mor Malke
8. Gregorius Ephraim (1908). Metropolitan of Mor Hananyo then Metropolitan of Jerusalem
9. Athanasius Tuma Qasir (1908–1912). Metropolitan of Mardin, then Metropolitan of Amid (1912-1914), then Metropolitan of Mosul (1917-1929), Metropolitan of Aleppo (1929-1933), and later Metropolitan of Mosul (1933-1951)
10. Clement John (1909). Ecumenical Metropolitan
11. Sleeba Mor Osthatheos (1908-1930). Ecumenical Metropolitan in India

Preceded by Ignatius Abdulmasih II	Syriac Orthodox Patriarch of Antioch; 1906–1915	Succeeded by Ignatius Elias III
