= Baselios Marthoma Mathews II =

Primate of the Malankara Orthodox Syrian Church

His Holiness Moran Mor Baselios Marthoma Mathews II Catholicos of the East and Malankara Metropolitan
- Malankara Orthodox Syrian Church
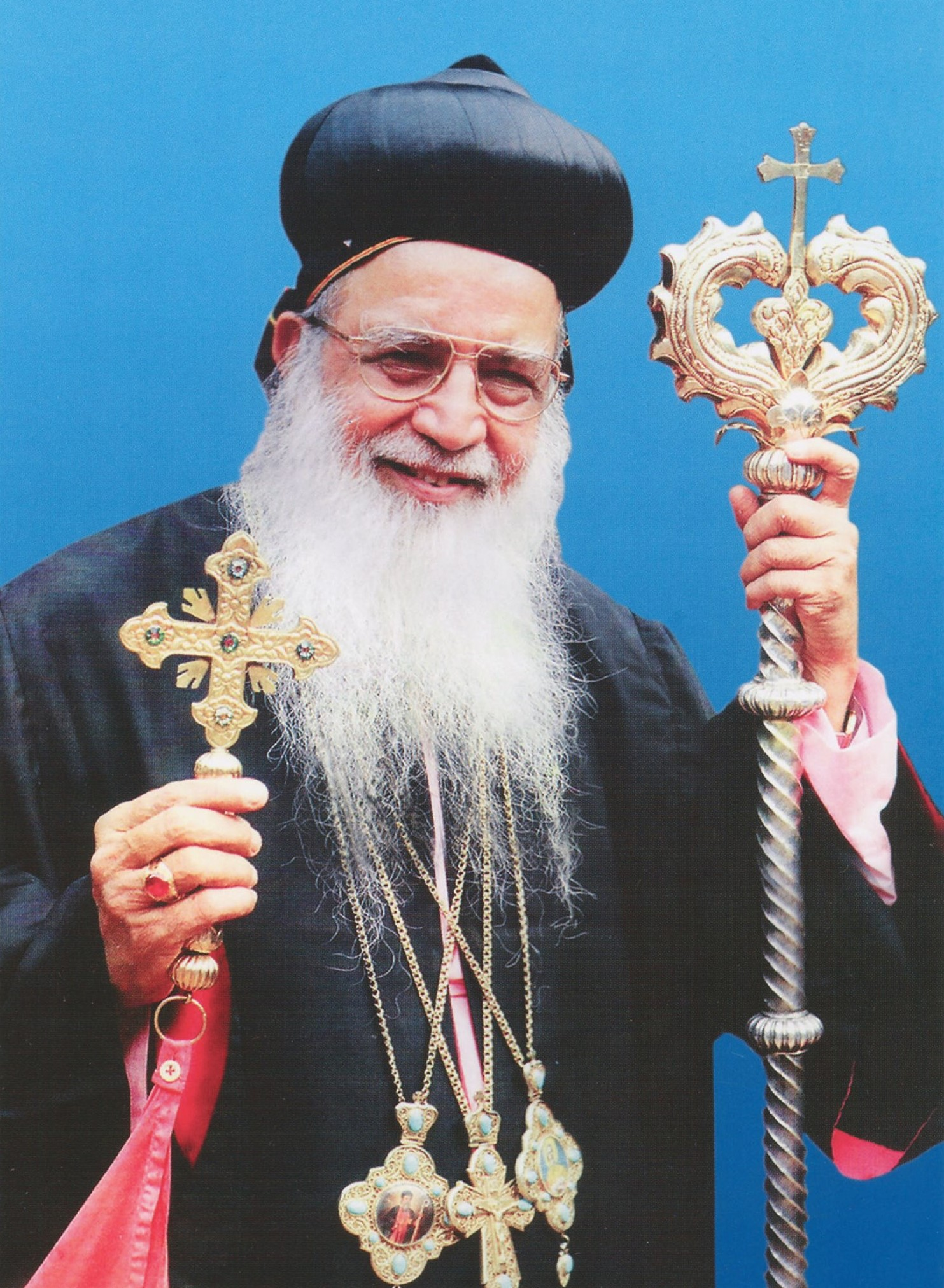
- Church: Malankara Orthodox Syrian Church
- See: Holy Apostolic see of Saint Thomas
- Installed: 29 April 1991
- Term ended: 25 October 2005
- Predecessor: Baselios Marthoma Mathews I
- Successor: Baselios Marthoma Didymos I

Orders
- Ordination: 1941
- Consecration: 15 May 1953
- Rank: Catholicos

Personal details
- Born: 30 January 1915 Perinad, Kollam, Kerala, India
- Died: 26 January 2006 (aged 90) Kottayam, Kerala, India
- Buried: Mount Horeb Chapel, Sasthamkotta, Kollam
- Education: Orthodox Theological Seminary; Basil Dayara; Bishop's College; General Theological Seminary

Baselios Marthoma Mathews II (30 January 1915 – 26 January 2006) was the primate of the Malankara Orthodox Syrian Church. He was 19th Malankara Metropolitan 6th Catholicos of Malankara Church.

== Early life ==
He was born at Perinad in Kollam district of Kerala, and had his theological education at Old Seminary Kottayam and also at Basil Dayara, Pathanamthitta. Later he joined Bishop's College, Calcutta, for his B. D. degree, and studied theology at the General Theological Seminary, New York.

== Priesthood ==
He was ordained as deacon in 1938 then as priest in 1941. Baselios Geevarghese II took special interest in the activities of Father Mathews. As a monk, Fr. Mathews stayed at St. George Dayara, Othara and led a prayerful life. The faithful members of the Church were attracted by the purity of life and refulgent smile of Fr. Mathews, and affectionately referred to him as "Angel Achen" (Malayalam: എയ്ഞ്ചെൽ അച്ചൻ, meaning 'angelic priest').

On 15 May 1953 he was ordained as bishop Mathews Mar Coorilose at the age of 38 by the Catholicos Baselios Geevarghese II. Mar Coorilose was appointed by the Catholicose to assist Metropolitan Alexios Mar Theodosius of Kollam Diocese. While he was Metropolitan of the Diocese of Kollam, the number of parishes almost doubled within a short period. Several monasteries and convents were established. A large number of educational institutions and hospitals were also established. In addition. several colleges, schools, hospitals and other service institutions were established and administered under his direct control and leadership. He traveled in various countries, including the United States, Canada, Europe, Malaya, Singapore and Gulf countries, and attended various international meetings and conferences.

== Primate ==
In 1980 he was unanimously elected by the Malankara Syrian Christian Association (the general assembly of representatives of the Church's parishes) as the successor-designate to the Catholicos of the East and Malankara Metropolitan.

A civil service academy was started at Thiruvananthapuram, to give proper training for candidates appearing for I. A. S.; I. P. S.; I. F. S. and other Central Service Examinations. With a view to provide shelter for the poor, a House Building Assistance project was started. When Catholicos Baselios Marthoma Mathews I abdicated the throne due to ill health, Coorilose was elevated to the throne of St Thomas as Baselious Marthoma Mathews II, Catholicos of the East and Malankara Metropolitan on 29 April 1991, becoming the Sixth Catholicos in Malankara and 89th Successor to the Holy Apostolic Throne of St Thomas.

He served as the president of the ecumenical committee in Kerala and also on various other inter-church committees. In 2002, Supreme Court declared him as the legitimate Malankara Metropolitan based on the Malankara Association decision conducted as per the supreme court order. However the patriarch faction didn't participate the association instead they formed a new church named Jacobite Syrian Christian Church and they declared that they are officially got separated from Malankara Orthodox Church. Mathews II as the head of the Episcopal Synod of Malankara Orthodox Church canonized Dionysius VI on the 69th feast day of the saint (24 February 2003). Dionysius is the second Indian saint to be canonized by the Malankara Orthodox Syrian Church.

== Retirement and death ==
Due to ill health from old age, Mathews II resigned his position as the supreme head of the Indian Orthodox Church on 29 October 2005. He died on 26 January 2006, and was interred at Mount Horeb Chapel, in Sasthamkotta on 28 January.

== See also ==
- Indian (Malankara) Orthodox Church

Oriental Orthodox titles
Preceded by Baselios Marthoma Mathews I 1975-1991	Catholicos of the East & Malankara Metropolitan; 1991–2005	Succeeded by Baselios Marthoma Didymos I 2005-2010
Preceded by Alexios Mar Theodosius	Metropolitan of Kollam Diocese; 1953–1991	Succeeded by Mathews Mar Epiphanios
