= Baselios Marthoma Didymos I =

20th Malankara Metropolitan and 7th Catholicos of the Malankara Church

His Holiness Moran Mar Baselios Marthoma Didymos I Catholicos of the East and Malankara Metropolitan
- Church: Malankara Orthodox Syrian Church
- See: The Holy Apostolic Throne of St Thomas
- Elected: 10 September 1992
- Installed: 31 October 2005
- Term ended: 1 November 2010
- Predecessor: Baselios Marthoma Mathews II
- Successor: Baselios Marthoma Paulose II

Orders
- Ordination: 25 January 1950
- Consecration: 24 August 1966
- Rank: Catholicos of the East and Malankara Metropolitan

Personal details
- Born: C. T. Thomas; 29 October 1921 Mavelikkara, India
- Died: 26 May 2014 (aged 92) Parumala, India
- Buried: Mount Tabor Dayara, Pathanapuram
- Denomination: Malankara Orthodox Syrian Church
- Parents: Ittyavira Thomas and Sosamma Thomas
- Education: C.M.S College (Intermediate); National College (BA); Maston Training College (BT); Christ Church College (MA)

Baselios Marthoma Didymus I born C. T. Thomas (29 October 1921 – 26 May 2014) was the primate of the Malankara Orthodox Church from 2005 to 2010. He was the 7th Catholicos of the Malankara since the Catholicate of the East was established India and the 20th Malankara Metropolitan. He was the 7th Catholicos of East.

== Early life ==
C. T. Thomas I was born as the son of Ittyavira Thomas of Chiramel-Mulamootil House in Nedumbram near Thiruvalla and Sosamma of Chiramel House in Mavelikara. At the age of 18, he joined Mount Tabor Dayara (monastery) in Pathanapuram in 1939. As the disciple of Thoma Mar Dionysius, Metropolitan of Niranam, he completed his high school education. In his speeches, Didymos I used to say that his parents who led lives of prayer and munificence were his first role models.

== Education ==
He passed his Intermediate from C.M.S College, Kottayam in 1945, his Baccalaureate in Arts degree from National College, Tiruchirapalli in 1951, his Baccalaureate degree in Theology from Maston Training College, Chennai in 1954, and his Magister of Art in English literature from Christ Church College, Kanpur in 1961. His favorite authors were Charles Lamb in English and Vaikom Muhammad Basheer in Malayalam.

== Career ==
As Rev. Fr. C. T. Thomas, he served as headmaster of Ponnayya High School, Thiruchirapalli and St. Stephens School, Pathanapuram. Within a year of taking charge as the headmaster of Ponnayya High School, Rev. Fr. C. T. Thomas was able to quadruple the percentage of passing students, who were chiefly poor children from marginalized families.

Later, Fr. C. T. Thomas also served as Professor and Head of the Department of English at St. Stephen's College, Pathanapuram, as well as the vice-principal of the College and as President of the Orthodox Youth Movement.

== Priesthood ==
C. T. Thomas started his service to the Church as a monk when he was a teenager. He was called to the monastic life by the late Metropolitan Mar Dionysius of Niranam. He completed his training for priesthood under the guidance of Thoma Mar Dionysius and Baselios Augen, Catholicos of the East. Geevarghese II Catholicos ordained him to the order of quroyo (reader deacon) on 11 March 1942 at Karapuzha Mar Gregorios Chapel. He was ordained a full deacon on 22 May 1947 at Thiruvalla Bethany Aramana Chapel and priest on 25 January 1950 at Pathanapuram Mount Tabor Dayara.

== Presbyterate ==
On 16 May 1965, Catholicos of the East Moran Mar Baselios Augen I tonsured him Ramban (monk) at Mount Tabor Dayara. The Malankara Syrian Christian Association which convened at Kottayam M. D. Seminary on 28 December 1965 and elected him to the office of Metropolitan along with four others priests, following the ancient tradition of, selecting bishops from the monastic ranks. Didymos I was consecrated as metropolitan bishop on 24 August 1966 at Kolencherry St. Peter's & St. Paul's Church and served as the metropolitan of the Malabar diocese from 1968.

On 24 August 1966 at Kolencherry, the Catholicos Baselios Augen I ordained him as Metropolitan and given the name Thomas Mar Timotheos, along with Dr. Philipose Mar Theophilos and Yuhanon Mar Severios. Following the order of the Catholicos, Mar Thimotheos became the assistant metropolitan of Malabar diocese on 11 November 1966. Pathrose Mar Osthathios, the metropolitan of Malabar, died on 2 February 1968. Mar Thimotheos succeeded him as the metropolitan of Malabar diocese.

== Bishopric ==
=== Election ===
Mar Thimotheos became the Metropolitan of Malabar diocese in 1968. He continued to be the General Superior of Mount Tabor Dayara and Convent in Pathanapuram until 2014. On 10 September 1992 the Malankara Association was convened at Parumala Seminary and elected him as successor-designate to the Malankara metropolitan and Catholicos of the East. Due to old age, the current Catholicos, Baselios Marthoma Mathews II, decided to abdicate the throne in 2005.

On 29 October 2005, Mar Thimotheos assumed the office of Malankara Metropolitan, and was installed as the Catholicos of the East and given the name Moran Mar Baselios Marthoma Didymos I on 31 October 2005 by his predecessor Mathews II. Didymos I was the first Catholicos of the East to be enthroned by his predecessor.

=== Enthronement ===
The enthronement took place at Parumala Seminary on 31 October 2005 at the age of 84. In addition to convening five sessions of Malankara Association (including one meeting that comprised two individual sessions), Didymos I ordained 14 Metropolitan Bishops (7 each on two occasions - at Puthuppally St. George Church on 19 February 2009 and at Kottayam Mar Elia Cathedral on 12 May 2010). During the reign of Didymos I, the strength of the Episcopal Synod became 33, the highest till date.

=== Consecration of Myron ===
Didymos I had, as a priest, attended the consecration of holy Myron (anointing oil) officiated by Baselios Geevarghese II in 1951. Later, as a Metropolitan, Didymos I was a co-celebrant in the consecration of holy Myron on four occasions (in 1967, officiated by Baselios Augen I; in 1977 and 1988, officiated by Baselios Marthoma Mathews I; and in 1999, officiated by Baselios Marthoma Mathews II). As the Catholicos of the East, Didymos I himself officiated in the consecration of holy Myron at Devalokam Catholicate Palace on 5 April 2009.

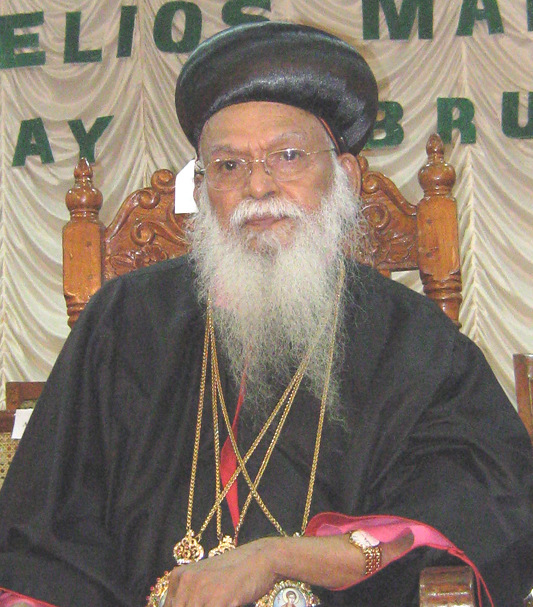

Following the Church's tradition of honoring eminent prelates of the past, Didymos I bestowed the title "Sabha-Thejas" (meaning 'great luminary of the Church') on Malankara Metropolitan Mar Dionysius V. The ancient churches declared as pilgrimage centers by Didymos I include St Mary's Orthodox Church, Kallooppara and St. George Orthodox Church, Cheppad. He visited Church members abroad.

=== Administrative reforms ===
Didymos I was the first Catholicos to preside over an official church secretariat, which administers to the affairs of the church. He also introduced progressive reforms in the administration of parishes, including the right for ladies of the congregations to participate in the parish assemblies (called palli-pothu-yogam). Some of the larger dioceses were divided creating new dioceses, in order to ensure more effective pastoral care and administration.

=== Fraternal visits ===
After his enthronement, Didymos I visited the Holy Land and met the Coptic Pope Shenouda III and exchanged fraternal greetings. During the incumbency of Didymos I, the prominent prelates who visited Malankara Orthodox Church include Supreme Catholicos of Armenia Karekin II, Ethiopian Patriarch Abune Paulos and Armenian Catholicos of Cilicia Aram I.

== Retirement and death ==
Didymos I abdicated the throne on 31 October 2010, at the age of 89. The following day he personally enthroned his successor Baselios Marthoma Paulose II as the Catholicos of the East. Didymos I spent the rest of his life at the Catholicate Palace. On 21 February 2014 he was given the Holy Anointing Service by Paulose II. Didymos died on 26 May 2014 and was buried on 28 May 2014 at Mount Tabor Dayara, Pathanapuram, the monastery which he called his home.

== Books ==
Didymos I wrote three books in Malayalam with the titles ജീവിതം സംസാരിക്കുന്നു (Life Speaks), ഒരു മഹര്ഷി സംസാരിക്കുന്നു (A Sage Speaks) and ശുശ്രൂഷാ നടപടിച്ചട്ടങ്ങള് (Rules and Regulations of Service).

Oriental Orthodox titles
Preceded by Baselios Marthoma Mathews II; 1991-2005	Catholicos of the East & Malankara Metropolitan; 2005–2010	Succeeded by Baselios Marthoma Paulose II; 2010-2021
Preceded by Pathrose Mar Osthathios	Metropolitan of the Diocese of Malabar; 1968–2005	Succeeded by Zacharias Mar Theophilus
