= Baselios Paulose I =

His Holiness Baselios Paulose I Catholicos of the East
- Malankara Orthodox Syrian Church
- See: Catholicos of the East (Indian Orthodox Church)
- Installed: 1909
- Term ended: 1913
- Predecessor: Post created
- Successor: Baselios Geevarghese I

Orders
- Ordination: 1852
- Consecration: 1876 by Patriarch Ignatios Petros III

Personal details
- Born: Paulose; 17 January 1836 Kolenchery
- Died: 2 May 1913 (aged 77) Pampakuda
- Buried: St.Thomas Orthodox Syrian Church, Pampakuda

Baselios Paulose I or Murimattathil Bava (17 January 1836 in Kolenchery, India – 2 May 1913) was the first Catholicos of the East after its reinstatement in India. The First Catholicos of the Malankara Orthodox Syrian Church was in power only for seven months and eighteen days (15 September 1912 till his death on 3 May 1913). He was 76 years old when he became the Catholiocs and died the following year.

== Early life and education ==
Paulosekutty, son of Kurien and Mariamma of the Murimattathil family, later to be Mar Baselios І, was born on 17 January 1836.

The ancestors of Murimattathil family belong to Pakalomatom family, from Bharananganam. This family was said to have been christened by St. Thomas. One family came by canoe and settled near the banks of Muvattupuzha river at Ramamangalam. The Murimattathil Kudumbam (family) has more than 600 families living near Ramamangalam. One branch settled at Kolenchery.

Thus Murimattathil Bava was born in a Murimattathil family of Kolenchery.

He learned Syriac at a very early age and read many religious books from the collection of his uncle, Youseph Kathanar.

When his elder brother, Kunjikkuru Chemmachen, a deacon, died, his parents and uncle Youseph Kathanar expressed their desire that Paulosekutty become deacon to take the place of Kunjikkuru. Paulosekutty was ordained Deacon by the Malankara Metropolitan Philipose Mar Dionysius (Mar Dionysius IV of Cheppad) at the age of seven.

Deacon Paulosekutty completed his Syriac education from Konattu Yohannan, Malpan of Pampakkuda. In 1852, at the age of 16, he was ordained priest by Yuyakkim Mar Kurilose. Fr. Paulose took the responsibility of Kolencherry Church. He had the opportunity to continue his Syriac education under Yuyakkim Mar Kurilose, Metropolitan from Syria.

In 1875 Patriarch of Antioch Ignatius Peter III visited Malankara. Paulose met him at Mulanthuraty. The Patriarch arranged for Fr. Paulose to be ordained as Metropolitan.

On 17 May 1877, Fr. Paulose was ordained as Mar Ivanios Metropolitan (bishop) at Kunnamkulam Church by Patriarch Peter III. He was assigned the responsibility of the Diocese Kandanad.

== First Catholicos of the East in India ==
The Vaideeka Synod (Synod of the Clergy) presided over by Ignatius Abdul Masih II and Malankara Association Managing Committee unanimously decided that Mar Ivanios Metropolitan be enthroned as Catholicos of the East. Ignatius Abdul Masih II was the controversially deposed Patriarch of Antioch and until the 1950s, some claimed the relocation of the Catholicate to India was without authority from the Universal Syriac Orthodox Synod, thus causing century-long disputes in the Malankara Church. However, this claim was dismissed by the Supreme Court of India in 1958, which accepted the validity and authority of the Catholicos of the East as the Primate of Malankara Orthodox Church.

Initially, Mar Ivanios refused to take up the position due to his ill health and old age, but later accepted when pressed to do so.

On 15 September 1912, Mar Ivanios Metropolitan was ordained and enthroned as Moran Mar Baselios Paulose I Catholicos of the East at Saint Mary's Church, Niranam by Ignatius Abdul Masih II.

When Baselios Paulose I was crowned on the Throne of Saint Thomas, Ignatius Abdul Masih II accepted the autonomy and autocephaly of the Malankara Orthodox Church with its own constitution and powers, which included the right to ordain Metropolitans, to consecrate Holy Chrism and perform other holy services.

Paulose I as Catholicos of the East resided at Orthodox Pazhaya Seminary, Kottayam.

== Legacy ==
Baselios Paulose I designed the order and style of the prayers and Holy Qurbana (Eucharist) that is still followed in the church. He established Malankara Suriani Suvishesha Sangham as well as Sunday schools in the church.

As Metropolitan he had built 17 churches in the Kandanad Diocese. He also started many schools. He trained many priests at St. Peters and St. Pauls Church of Kolenchery. He bought land at Muvattupuzha to build an Aramana (palace) which became the church headquarters and also built a small church there.

== Death ==
Upon falling ill Paulose I expressed his desire to settle in one of the churches of Kandanad Diocese. However the trustee of the clergy, Mani Paulose Palapillil of Pampakuda, invited him to his church and provided him with the necessary facilities. Bava predicted the day of his demise and a large crowd of people visited him and waited in prayer. He died on 2 May 1913 and was buried at St. Thomas Orthodox Church, Pampakuda on the next day.

Oriental Orthodox titles
Preceded by Post created	Catholicos of the East in Malankara; 1912–1913	Succeeded by Baselios Geevarghese I 1925-1928
