= Catholicos of the East and Malankara Metropolitan =

Title of the primate of the Malankara Orthodox Syrian Church

Malankara Orthodox Syriac Church
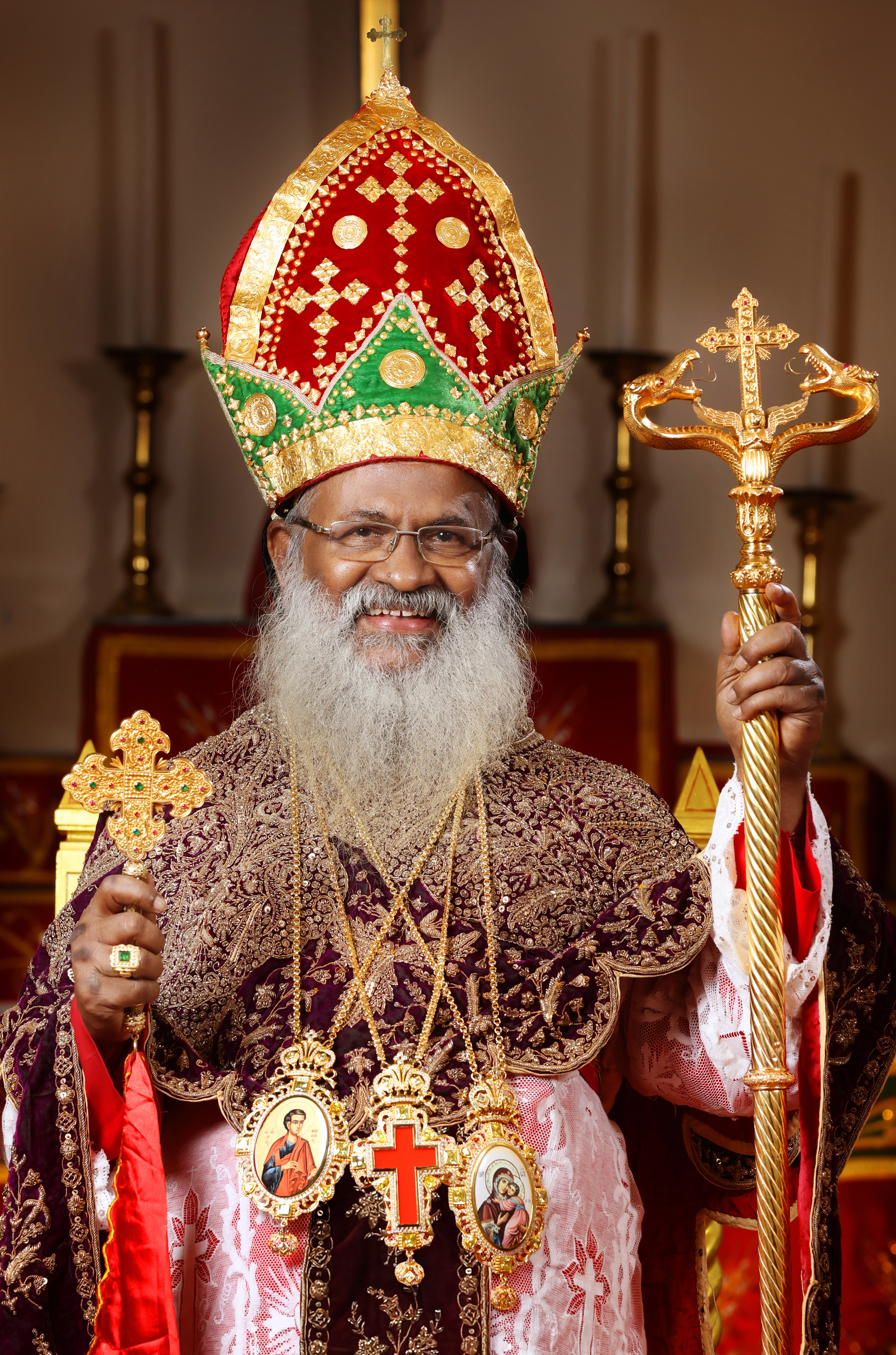
- Catholicos Baselios Marthoma Mathews III

Location
- Country: India

Information
- First holder: Thoma I as Malankara Metropolitan, Baselios Paulose I as Catholicos of the East, Baselios Geevarghese II as (Catholicos of the East and Malankara Metropolitan)
- Denomination: Malankara Orthodox Syrian Church
- Rite: West Syriac Rite
- Established: 1653 (by Thoma I - Malankara Metropolitan); 1912 (by Patriarch Ignatius Abded Mshiho II - Catholicate of the East)
- Cathedral: Mar Eliyah Cathedral, Kottayam

The leader of the Malankara Orthodox Syrian Church uses the title Catholicos of the East and Malankara Metropolitan. The incumbent 'Catholicos of the East and Malankara Metropolitan' is Baselios Marthoma Mathews III.

== History ==
The leaders of the Puthenkoor faction (also known as the Malankara Church) of the Saint Thomas Christians were called Malankara Metropolitans since the Coonan Cross Oath of 1653. Archdeacon Parampil Thoma, the leader of the Coonan Cross Oath rebellion against the Portuguese Roman Catholic authorities, is known to be the first in this lineage. The protesting Christians met at the church in Alangad to discuss their further steps and declared Thoma as the Malankara Metropolitan. However, this episcopal ordination, which took place in the absence of another bishop, was questioned from the very beginning. Therefore Thoma sought help from other Eastern churches. Only the Syrian Orthodox Church of Antioch responded favorably to his plea and in the person of Archbishop Gregorios Abdal Jaleel recognised Thoma as bishop. In the following years, the Malankara Church moved further into an ecclesiastical union with the Syriac Orthodox Church of Antioch and its patriarch was recognised as the supreme spiritual leader of the Malankara Church.

In 1909 Syriac Orthodox Patriarch of Antioch Ignatius Abd-Allah II appointed Geevarghese Dionysius Vattasseril as Malankara Metropolitan. But soon the Malankara Metropolitan who was at loggerheads with the Patriarch declared independence from the Patriarch. The Patriarch deposed him and appointed a new Malankara Metropolitan in his stead.

In the meantime, the deposed former Patriarch Ignatius Abded Mshiho II arrived in Kerala in 1912 on the invitation of Dionysius. He, at the request of Dionysius, announced the relocation of the Maphrianate of the East to India and appointed Paulos Ivanios Murimattathil as the Catholicos of the East with the regnal name Baselios Paulus I. This triggered a lasting split the community and from then on, those who followed the Malankara Metropolitan was called the "Metran party" (later Malankara Orthodox Syrian Church, and those who affirmed the rule of the Patriarch of Antioch in Syria and the new Malankara Metropolitan he appointed were called the "Bawa party" (later Malankara Jacobite Syrian Orthodox Church).

== Organization ==
- The church is in the Oriental Orthodox family following the Orthodox faith of the three Ecumenical Councils of Nicaea, Constantinople and Ephesus.
- The Malankara Orthodox Syrian Church is a division of the Orthodox Syrian Church and the chief Primate of the Orthodox Syrian Church is the Patriarch of Antioch.
- The Orthodox Syrian Church of the East is an autocephalous branch of the Orthodox Syrian Church and the chief Primate of the Orthodox Syrian Church of the East is the Catholicos of the East aka Maphrian.
- The Malankara Orthodox Syrian Church is an autonomous metropolitan Archdiocese of the Orthodox Syrian Church of the East. The Primate of the Malankara Orthodox Syrian Church is called the Malankara Metropolitan.
- The two titles, Catholicos of the East and Malankara Metropolitan, are with separate responsibilities, but have been always held by the same individual in accordance with the constitution of the Church adopted in 1934.
- As Catholicos of the East, he consecrates bishops for the Indian Orthodox Church, presides over the synod, declares and implements its decisions, conducts the administration on behalf of the synod, and consecrates the Holy Mooron (oil).
- As Malankara Metropolitan., he is the head of the Malankara Church, the President of the Malankara Syrian Christian Association and the Managing Committee. The prime jurisdiction regarding the temporal, ecclesiastical, and spiritual administration of the Indian Orthodox Church is vested in the Malankara Metropolitan subject to the provisions of the church constitution adopted in 1934.

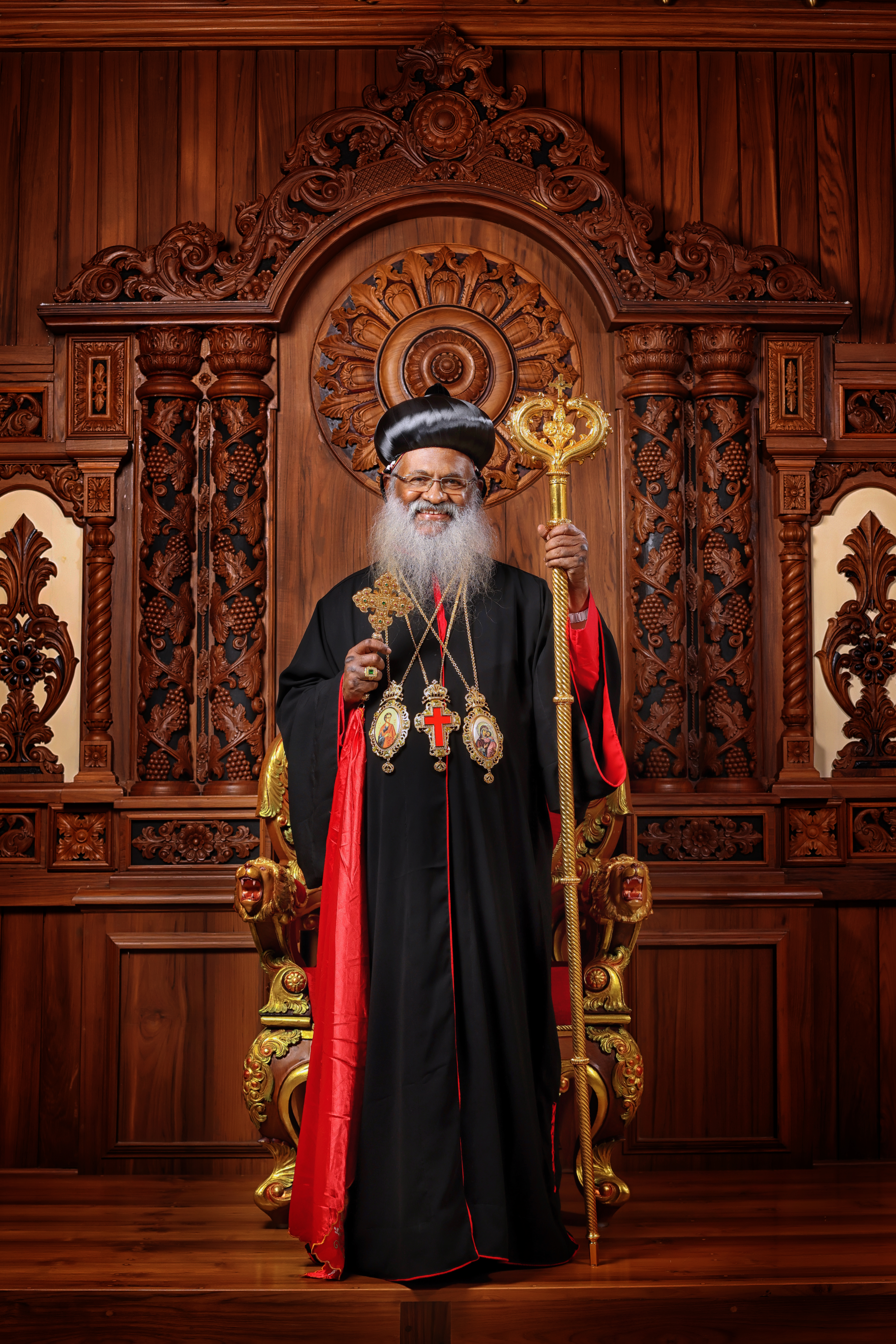
Baselius Marthoma Mathews III

== Malankara Metropolitan ==
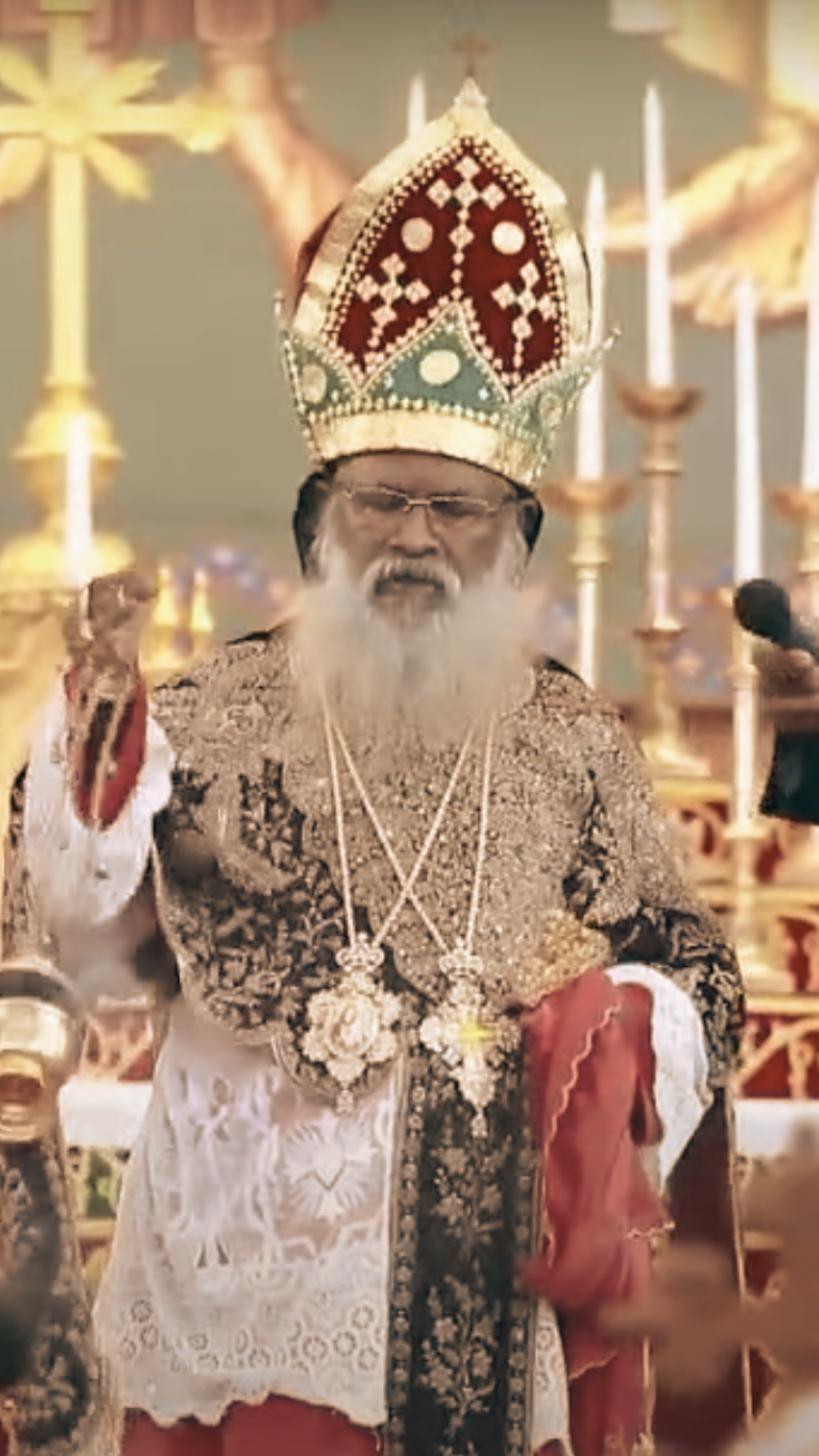
Baselios Marthoma Mathews III, vested in the ceremonial robes of the Malankara Metropolitan

Malankara Metropolitan is the episcopal title given by the government Travancore State to the head of the historic Malankara Church.

The main responsibility for the secular administration of the church rests with the Malankara Metropolitan. Powers of the Malankara Metropolitan is to convene and preside over committees such as the Malankara Association and the Managing Committee, and to act as Metropolitan Trustee to administer the common church properties in cooperation with the Priest and Laity Trustees.

== Catholicos of the East ==
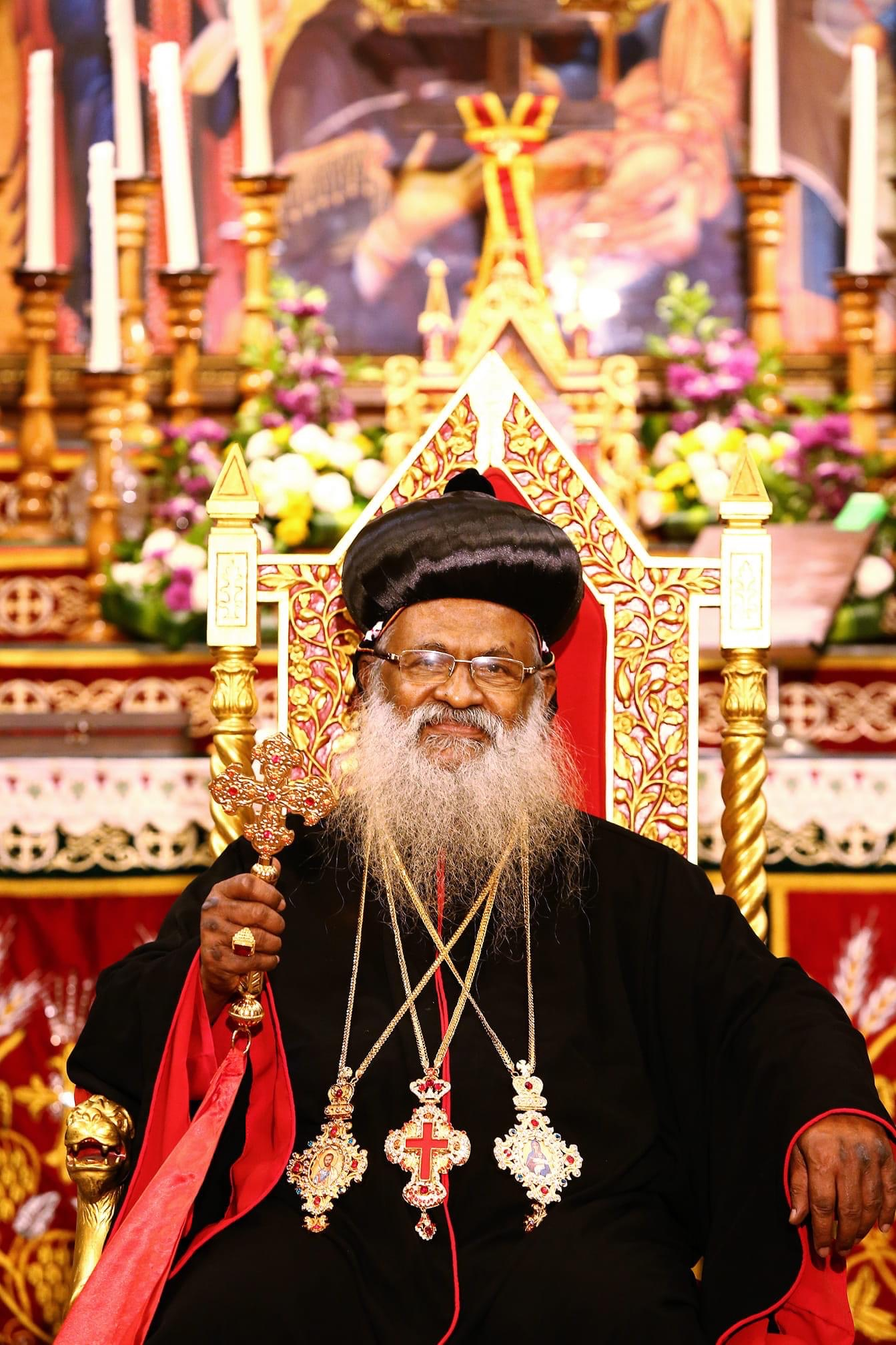
Baselios Marthoma Mathews III as Catholicos of the East

The Catholicos of the East is a primatial title that came into usage in the Malankara Church during the schism of 1912. The office of the catholicos, called the catholicate, was established by Patriarch Ignatius Abded Mshiho II, at the request of Dionysius Geevarghese Vattasseril, as a sign of jurisdictional independence from the reigning Patriarch Ignatius Abded Aloho II. Baselios Paulos I Murimattathil was the founding Catholicos of the Church. Their reasoning to its establishment was that the Malankara Church was under the Church of the East in ancient times and therefore, it can be seen as the only remaining Oriental Orthodox part of the Persian Church. Hence the Maphrianate or Catholicate of the East is to be present in India.

The Catholicate of the East is autocephalous in nature and has the right to administer the responsibilities of the Patriarch of Antioch in the Malankara Church as the Vicar of the Patriarch. The powers of the Patriarch that are delegated to the Catholicos include the consecration of bishops, presiding over the episcopal synod, canonization of saints, and consecration of the Holy Myron. The Patriarch remains superior to the Catholicos and retains his historical powers in the Malankara Church but he is expected to administer his powers only in conjunction with the Catholicos. An Indian Supreme Court ruling determined that the Patriarch of Antioch's power in the Malankara Church had reached a "vanishing point" following the catholicate's establishment.

== List of primates ==
=== List of Malankara metropolitans till 1934 ===
- Marthoma I (1653–1670)
- Marthoma II (1670–1686)
- Marthoma III (1686–1688)
- Marthoma IV (1688–1728)
- Marthoma V (1728–1765)
- Dionysius I (Marthoma VI; 1765–1808)
- Marthoma VII (1808–1809)
- Marthoma VIII (1809–1816)
- Marthoma IX (1816–1817)
- Dionysius II (Pulikkottil Dionysius Joseph I; 1816–1816)
- Geevarghese Philoxenos II (Kidangan Geevarghese Mar Philexenos II; 1816–1818)
- Dionysius III (Punnathara Dionysius Geevarghese; 1818–1825)
- Dionysius IV (Cheppad Dionysius Philppose; 1825–1852)
- Mathews Athanasius (1852–1877)
- Dionysius V (Pulikkottil Dionysius Joseph II; 1864–1909)
- Dionysius VI (Vattasseril Dionysius Geevarghese; 1909–1934)

=== List of catholicoi up to 1934 ===
1. Baselios Paulose I (1912–1913)
2. Baselios Geevarghese I (1925–1928)
3. Baselios Geevarghese II (1929–1964)

=== List of catholicoi of the East and Malankara Metropolitans since 1934 ===
- Baselios Geevarghese II (Catholicos: 1929–1964; from 1934 the two titles were held together)
- Baselios Augen I (1964–1975)

==== Primates after the 1975 schism ====
- Baselios Marthoma Mathews I (1975–1991)
- Baselios Marthoma Mathews II (1991–2005)
- Baselios Marthoma Didymos I (2005–2010)
- Baselios Marthoma Paulose II (2010–2021)
- Baselios Marthoma Mathews III (2021–present)

== Catholicose Consecrations held in Malankara ==
Catholicos	Date	Venue	Chief Celebrant/s
H.H Baselios Paulose I	15 September 1912	St Mary's Orthodox Church, Niranam	H.H Ignatius Abdul Masih II
H.H Baselios Geevarghese I	30 April 1925	St Mary's Orthodox Church, Niranam	Saint Vattasseril Geevarghese Mar Dionysius (Malankara Metropolitan); Geevarghese Mar Gregorios (later H.H. Baselios Geevarghese II); Yuyakim Mar Ivanios (Karottuveettil)
H.H Baselios Geevarghese II	15 February 1929	Mar Elia Cathedral, Kottayam	Saint Vattasseril Geevarghese Mar Dionysius (Malankara Metropolitan)
H.H Baselios Augen I	22 May 1964	M.D. Seminary Chapel, Kottayam	H.H Patriarch Ignatius Ya`qub III
H.H Baselios Marthoma Mathews I	27 October 1975	Old Seminary (Pazhaya Seminary)	H.G Daniel Mar Philoxenos and other bishops of Holy Episcopal Synod
H.H Baselios Marthoma Mathews II	29 April 1991	Parumala Seminary	H.G Geevarghese Mar Osthathios and other bishops of Holy Episcopal Synod
H.H Baselios Marthoma Didymos I	31 October 2005	Parumala Seminary	H.H Baselios Marthoma Mathews II
H.H Baselios Marthoma Paulose II	1 November 2010	Parumala Seminary	H.H Baselios Marthoma Didymos I
H.H Baselios Marthoma Mathews III	15 October 2021	Parumala Seminary	H.G Kuriakose Mar Clemis Valiya Metropolitan and other bishops of Holy Episcopal Synod

== See also ==
- Malankara Metropolitan
- List of Malankara metropolitans
- Malankara Orthodox Syrian Church
