= Mathai Nooranal =

Rev. Fr. Mathai Nooranal (1928–2002) was a priest of the Malankara Orthodox Syrian Church. He was a social worker and a philanthropist.

Fr. Mathai Nooranal served as vicar of the St. Mary's Orthodox Cathedral, Sulthan Bathery, Kerala from 1951 until his death in 2002. He was instrumental in setting up the St. Mary's College in Sulthan Bathery, the first college in Wayanad district. He was the president of Sulthan Bathery Co-Operative Bank for more than thirty years.

Fr. Mathai Nooranal died on 29 November 2002 at Sulthan Bathery.

He contested for Kerala State Legislative Assembly from Sulthan Bathery (State Assembly constituency) as an Independent candidate on behalf of the CPI(M) in the 2001 Kerala Legislative Assembly election and lost against Indian National Congress candidate N. D. Appachan.

== See also ==
- Malankara Orthodox Syrian Church
