= Voskehat, Armavir =

Village in Armavir, Armenia

Voskehat Ոսկեհատ
- Location within Armenia
- Coordinates: 40°08′29″N 44°19′45″E
- Country: Armenia
- Province: Armavir

Population (2011)
  - Total: 3,491

Voskehat (Armenian: Ոսկեհատ, also Romanized as Voskeat; formerly, Patr'inj) is a village in the Armavir Province of Armenia.

It has a population of 3,491 at the 2011 census, up from 2,369 at the 2001 census.

== See also ==
- Armavir Province
