= Ignatius Abdulmasih II =

117th Patriarch of the Syriac Orthodox Church of Antioch (1895 - 1903)

- Syriac Orthodox Patriarch of Antioch and All the East
- Church: Syriac Orthodox Church
- See: Antioch
- Installed: 1895
- Quashed: 1903
- Predecessor: Ignatius Peter IV
- Successor: Ignatius Abded Aloho II

Personal details
- Born: 17 January 1854 Qal’at Mara, Diyarbekir Vilayet, Ottoman Empire
- Died: 30 August 1915 (aged 61) Monastery of Mor Hananyo, Diyarbekir Vilayet, Ottoman Empire
- Residence: Monastery of Mor Hananyo

Ignatius Abdulmasih II (17 January 1854 – 30 August 1915) was the Patriarch of Antioch, and head of the Syriac Orthodox Church from 1895 until his deposition in 1903.

== Early life ==
Abdulmasih was born in the village of Qal’at Mara, east of Mardin, in 1854 and at the age of 12, in 1866, he joined the Monastery of Mor Hananyo where he began his education. Seven years later, in 1873, he entered the monastic orders, becoming a monk. In 1875, Abdulmasih was ordained as priest, and in 1886, he was consecrated as a bishop.

After the death of Patriarch Ignatius Peter IV in 1894, a rivalry began between Abdulmasih and Gregorius Abded Sattuf, later Moran Mor Ignatius Abded Aloho II, metropolitan bishop of Homs and Hama, to be elected to the patriarchal throne. According to American missionaries operating in Syria at the time, the Ottoman government interfered and intimidated bishops based on the highest bidder. However, in 1895, Abdulmasih was elected and consecrated patriarch, upon which he assumed the patriarchal name Ignatius.

== Patriarch of Antioch ==
Abdulmasih ascended to the patriarchal throne at the onset of a time of great difficulty for the Syriac Orthodox Church as, in October of the same year, demonstrations held by Armenian and Syriac Christians against the Ottoman governor of Amed led to a massacre at the hands of the Muslim population throughout the province and the deaths of two-thirds of Syriac Christians in the Ottoman Empire.

According to Father Armalet, the governor summoned Abdulmasih to Amed, where the patriarch witnessed the effects of the massacre first-hand, and according to oral tradition this experience traumatised him, causing Abdulmasih to drink upon his return to the patriarchal seat. The oral tradition claims that Abdulmasih's drinking led to his deposition by a group of bishops within the church. During the massacres, the village of Qal’at Mara, the birthplace of Abdulmasih, was abandoned due to Kurdish attacks.

Abdulmasih remained patriarch until his deposition on 10 November 1903, however by who and why is highly controversial within the church. The deposition was the result of an order of prohibition by the rulers of the region on 10 November 1903 and withdrawal of the firman granted to Abdulmasih upon his ascendency. Supporters of his successor, Ignatius Abded Aloho II, claim that Abdulmasih had converted to Catholicism and was excommunicated by the Holy Synod as a result. Whereas supporters of Abdulmasih claim Abded Sattuf bribed the Ottoman Government to issue a firman deposing Abdulmasih as Patriarch. Meanwhile Abdul Messiah had gone into the Syriac Catholic Church and came back before his death. The letters written by the pope to him and the Syriac Catholic patriarchate proves this.

Ignatius Abdulmasih was the legitimate Patriarch from 5 August 1906 until his death in 1915 and was based in the Monastery of Mor Marqos in Jerusalem, where he had been bishop. However, Abdulmasih continued to reside at the Patriarchal residence in the Monastery of Mor Hananyo.

== Malankara Church ==
The rivalry between the two patriarchs caused a rift within the church which was exacerbated when Abded Sattuf ordained Indian metropolitan bishops in 1908, creating fear in the Malankara Church that he would attempt to take control of the church, reversing the decisions of the Council of Mulanthuruthy in 1876. As a result, supporters of Abdulmasih began to call for the appointment of a Maphrian or Catholicos to prevent the Malankara Church coming under Abded Sattuf's control.

In 1912, Abdulmasih was invited to India by the Malankara Metropolitan Geevarghese Mar Dionysius of Vattasseril to discuss with the Malankara Synod who would be appointed "Catholicos", a request which he had refused previously. The Synod unanimously voted for Mar Ivanios to become Catholicos and on 15 September 1912 Abdulmasih consecrated Ivanios as Baselios Paulose I at St. Mary's Church, Niranam as well as Geevarghese Mar Gregorios, Geevarghese Mar Philoxenos and Yuyakkim Mar Ivanios as Bishops. He also granted the Episcopal Synod, headed by the Malankara Metropolitan, the authority to consecrate a new Catholicos when the See became vacant.

This led to the permanent division between what would become the Malankara Orthodox Syrian Church who contested Abdulmasih's deposition, and the Jacobite Syrian Christian Church who supported Abded Aloho II.

== Later years ==
In March 1913 Abdulmasih returned to Mardin where he spent the remaining years of his life in prayer and peace. He died on 30 August 1915 and was entombed in the Monastery of Mor Hananyo, the traditional resting place of Patriarchs of Antioch. He was entombed in a similar fashion to his predecessors and his tomb is adjacent to the tombs of HH Patriarch Peter III and Mor Philoxenos Hanna Dolabani. The Malankara Orthodox Syrian Church observes his memorial feast on August 15.[4]

== Episcopal succession ==
- Iyawannis Elias (1896–1908). Metropolitan of Jerusalem
- Dionysius AbdulNour (1896–1933). Metropolitan of Kharpot, then Metropolitan of Syria in 1913, then Metropolitan of Amid

Preceded by Ignatius Peter IV	List of Syriac Orthodox Patriarchs of Antioch; 1895–1903	Succeeded by Ignatius Abded Aloho II
