= Emilianos Zacharopoulos =

Emilianos Zacharopoulos (April 12, 1915 in Halki – September 8, 2011 in Athens) was the first Eastern Orthodox metropolitan bishop of Belgium, Netherlands and Luxembourg, since 1969, under jurisdiction of Ecumenical Patriarchate of Constantinople. In 1983, he returned to Greece, became Metropolitan of Kos and retired in 2009.

== Literature ==
- Kiminas, Demetrius (2009). The Ecumenical Patriarchate: A History of Its Metropolitanates with Annotated Hierarch Catalogs. Wildside Press LLC. ISBN 9781434458766.
