= Vakathanam =

- village
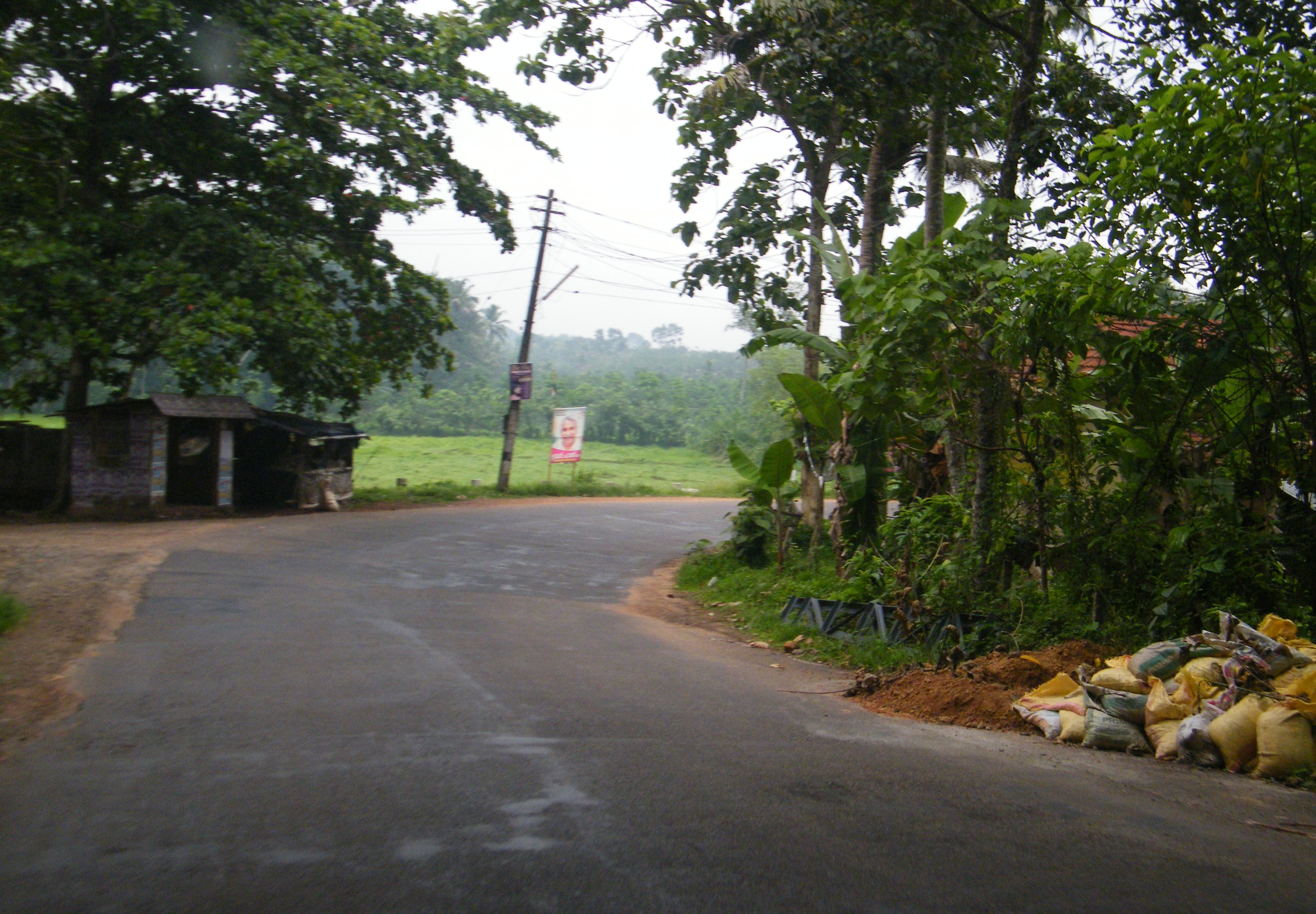
- Vakathanam Road
- Interactive map of Vakathanam
- Coordinates: 9.5188°N 76.5771°E
- Country: India
- State: Kerala
- District: Kottayam district

Government
  - Type: Grama Panchayat

Languages
  - Official: Malayalam, English
- Time zone: UTC+5:30 (IST)
- Postal code: 686538
- Vehicle registration: KL-05, KL-33
- Nearest city: Kottayam, Changanacherry
- Website: http://vakathanam.com

Vakathanam is a Panchayat in Kottayam district of Kerala, India. It is 12 kilometres (7.5 mi) from Kottayam. Vakathanam panchayat consists of two villages: Vakathanam and Thottakkad.

== Demographics ==
According to the cens of 2011 there were 4972 families with a total of 19589 residents, 9429 males and 10160 females.
