= C. M. Stephen =

Indian politician (1918–1984)

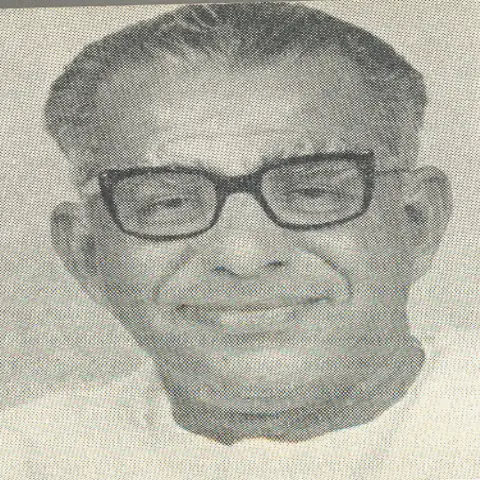

Union Minister of Communications of India
- In office 2 March 1980 – 2 September 1982
- Preceded by: Bhishma Narain Singh
- Succeeded by: Anant Sharma

Union Minister of Shipping and Transport
- In office 3 September 1982 – 2 February 1983
- Preceded by: Veerendra Patil
- Succeeded by: Kotla Vijaya Bhaskara Reddy

3rd Leader of the Opposition in Lok Sabha
- In office 12 April 1978 – 9 July 1979
- Preceded by: Yashwantrao Chavan
- Succeeded by: Yashwantrao Chavan

Member of the Lok Sabha
- In office 1971–1977
- Constituency: Muvattupuzha
- In office 1977–1979
- Constituency: Idukki
- In office 1980–1984
- Constituency: Gulbarga

Member of the Kerala Legislative Assembly
- In office 1960–1964
- Constituency: Thrikadavoor

Personal details
- Born: 23 December 1918 Mavelikkara, Travancore State, British India (present–day Kerala, India)
- Died: 16 January 1984 (aged 65) Mavelikkara, Kerala, India
- Party: Indian National Congress (I) (1951–1984)

Chembakassery Mathai Stephen (23 December 1918 – 16 January 1984) was an Indian politician who served as the Union Minister of Communications of India from 1980 to 1982 in the Republic of India.

C. M. Stephen was born on 23 December 1918 to Eapen Mathai and Esther of Chembakassery house in Cherukole, Mavelikkara. During his school days, Stephen was active in the Balajanasakhyam (promoted by Malayala Manorama). This helped him to develop leadership qualities, oratorial and organizing skills.

== Career ==
After completing B. L., Stephen started his career as a journalist. He also started 'Pouraprabha' an evening daily. Through this daily, he supported the Travancore Congress and attacked the rule of C. P. Ramaswamy Iyer. In 1949, he gave up his career as a journalist and started practising law. In 1951, he joined active politics and in the same year became the D.C.C. president of Kollam.

He was a close associate of veteran Congress leaders P. T. Chacko, Pattom Thanu Pillai and R. Sankar and provided leadership in the Vimochana Samaram during 1958-59 period as an associate of P. T. Chacko, Pattom Thanu Pillai, R. Sankar and others.

He was also one of the founding fathers of Indian National Trade Union Congress, the trade union wing of the Indian National Congress. He won the State elections in 1960, 1965 and 1971. He was also elected as a Member of Parliament from Idukki in the 1976 parliamentary elections. He was a close aide of then Prime Minister Indira Gandhi. He was the leader of the Congress Parliamentary Party - Indira faction during 1978–79.

C. M. Stephen also served in the Union Cabinet under Indira Gandhi, most notably as the Union Minister for Communications (1980–84). Shashi Tharoor in his 'India: From Midnight to the Millennium' quotes Stephen's statement in Parliament that "the telephone was a luxury and not a necessity" as symptomatic of India's failure to invest in infrastructure and communications before the Reforms of 1991.

Dharam Singh gave up the Gulbarga Lok Sabha seat to accommodate C. M. Stephen, the then Union Home Minister in the Indira Gandhi Cabinet, after he lost the election in Delhi to Atal Bihari Vajpayee.

C. M. Stephen was buried at St. Mary Orthodox Cathedral, Mavelikkara.
