= Orthodox Theological Seminary, Kottayam =

Orthodox Theological Seminary
- Pazhaya Seminary
- പഴയ സെമിനാരി
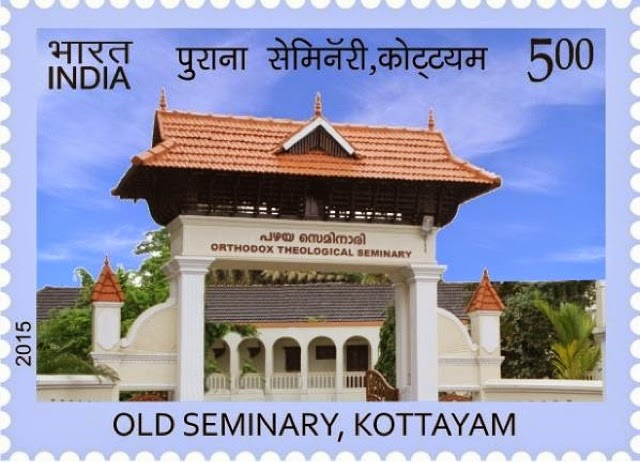
- A 2015 stamp dedicated to the 200th anniversary of the Orthodox Theological Seminary
- Location: Kottayam, Kerala
- Country: India
- Denomination: Malankara Orthodox Syrian Church
- Website: http://www.ots.edu.in

History
- Former name(s): Kottayam Seminary, Kottayam College, Syrian Seminary
- Founded: 1815
- Founder: Pullikottil Dionysius I (Dionysius II)
- Consecrated: Pullikottil Dionysius I - 10th Malankara Metropolitan Pulikkottil Joseph Dionysious II - 14th Malankara Metropolitan Vattasseril Dionysius VI - 15th Malankara Metropolitan Paulose Mar Gregorios - Former Principal of the Seminary and Metropolitan of Delhi diocese of Malankara Church

Clergy
- Bishop(s): Patron and Custodian of the Seminary is the Malankara Metropolitan, presently Baselios Marthoma Mathews III

The Orthodox Theological Seminary, also known as Old Seminary (Pazhaya Seminary) and M. D. Orthodox Seminary, is a seminary of the Malankara Orthodox Syrian Church. It was founded in 1815 by priest-monk Pulikkottil Joseph Ittoop Ramban (later Mar Dionysius II) with the help of Colonel John Munro to serve the Malankara Syrian Church and to invite CMS missionaries to teach theology. At that time, deacons were ordained as priests without an organized theological education. After the arrival of CMS missionaries, theological education was organized for the priests.

John Munro, the British Resident of the Kingdom of Travancore, offered his unreserved support for the initiative, and upon his insistence, the Queen of Travancore granted 16 acres (65,000 m^{2}) of tax-free land, Rs. 20,000 and the necessary timber for the construction of the Seminary. The work started in 1813, and the building was completed and classes began in March 1815.

By Munro's invitation, the Church Missionary Society (C.M.S) missionaries arrived in Kerala to help as teachers in the seminary. For some years, the relationship between the missionaries and the Church was one of cordial co-operation. The missionaries taught the Bible and biblical languages in the Seminary. The early principals were Benjamin Bailey and Henry Baker.

After some time, the relationship of the church with the later missionaries became strained as they wanted to introduce Anglican doctrines in the church, which eventually led to disputes and litigation. The missionaries separated from the Malankara Church and established the Anglican Church in Kerala.

The seminary was the residence and headquarters of the Malankara Metropolitan, the chief metropolitan of the Malankara Church. It was also the previous Headquarters of the Malankara Orthodox Syrian Church. It continued the programme of training ordinands. Eminent Malpans (teachers of theology and liturgy) rendered service to the institution. Some of the distinguished teachers included Abraham Malpan, Geevarghese Gregorios of Parumala, Geevarghese Dionysius of Vattasseril, Konat Mathan Corepiscopa, Skaria Cheriamadam, Skaria Elavinamannil, Alexander Mattakkal, Augen Mar Timotheos (later Baselios Augen I), V.K.Mathews (later Baselios Mar Thoma Mathews I), Philipose Theophilus and Paulos Gregorios.

In 1942, the seminary was refreshed and reorganized to better serve the community. An organized system of courses was introduced. A new generation of qualified professors of theology and biblical studies took responsibility for running the Seminary. Classes and students' residence were moved to the new buildings in the campus of the M.D. Seminary at Kottayam. When the Malankara Metropolitan moved his residence from the old seminary to the present site in Devalokam, Kottayam, theological education was once again brought back to the old seminary. In 1964, the Seminary became affiliated to the Serampore University for its B.D. degree course. In 1965, the 150th year of its founding, was celebrated in the presence of ecclesiastical dignitaries and church leaders.

The foundation stone of the new building was laid by Vasken I, Supreme Catholicos of the Armenian Apostolic Church of Etchmiadzin, on 23 December 1963 during his visit to the Malankara Syrian Church. Patriarch Justinian of Romania, declared the new building open on 7 January 1969 during his visit to the Malankara Church. Other eminent visitors to the Seminary included Emperor Haile Selassie I of Ethiopia, Patriarch Pimen I of Moscow and all the Rus', Patriarch Ilia II of Georgia and the Ecumenical Patriarch Bartholomew I.

The M. D. Orthodox Seminary, in an ecumenical collaboration with the C.S.I Seminary (KUT) Trivandrum and the Marthoma Seminary, Kottayam, runs the Master's and Doctoral programmes under the banner of the Federated Faculty for Research in Religion and Culture.

On 21 April 2015, a postage stamp commemorating the 200 years of the Orthodox Theological Seminary was released by the Indian President Pranab Mukherjee.

== See also ==
- St. Thomas Orthodox Theological Seminary, Nagpur
