= Baselios Geevarghese II =

Malankara Metropolitan and Catholicoi of Malankara

His Holiness Moran Mar Baselios Geevarghese II Catholicos of the East & Malankara Metropolitan
- Malankara Church
- See: Catholicos of the East and Malankara Metropolitan
- Installed: 15 February 1929 (Catholicos of the East) & 26 December 1934 (Malankara Metropolitan)
- Term ended: 3 January 1964
- Predecessor: As the Malankara Metropolitan : Geevarghese Mar Dionysius of Vattasseril; As the Catholicos of the East : Baselios Geevarghese I
- Successor: Baselios Augen I (Malankara Metropolitan and Catholicos of the East)

Orders
- Ordination: 1898
- Consecration: 8 September 1912 by Ignatius Abded Mshiho II

Personal details
- Born: 16 June 1874 Kurichy
- Died: 3 January 1964 (aged 89) Kottayam
- Buried: Catholicate Palace, Devalokam, Kottayam

Moran Mor Baselios Geevarghese II of the Malankara Church (16 June 1874 – 3 January 1964). Third Catholicos of the East in Malankara and 16th Malankara Metropolitan, was born to Ulahannan and Naithi of the Kallaserri family in Kurichy, Kottayam India on 16 June 1874.

On 24 April 1892, Kadavil Paulose Mar Athanasios ordained him as deacon and on 24 November and 27 November 1898 he was ordained as priest and Ramban respectively by Parumala Mar Gregorios. He resided in Kundara church and took charge of the southern dioceses of the Malankara Orthodox Syrian Church. He also served as Manager and Malpan of the Old Seminary. His published books included "Sahaden marude Charithram". "Rahasya Prarthanakal". "Parudeesa", and "Mar Yuhanon Mamdana".

On 8 September 1912 Ignatius Abded Mshiho II consecrated him as Metropolitan Geevarghese Mar Gregorios at Parumala Seminary. He was appointed as the Metropolitan of Thumpamon, Kollam and Niranam dioceses. On 15 February 1929, the Episcopal Synod of Malankara headed by Malankara Metropolitan Vattaserril Geevarghese Mar Dionysius installed him as the Catholicos of the East, succeeding Catholicos Baselius Geevarghese I, who had died in the previous year.

When the Association met on 26 December 1934 at M.D. Seminary, Kottayam, he was chosen as Malankara Metropolitan. It was a period when issues within the Malankara Orthodox Syrian Church were becoming very complicated. Through prayer and fasting he received the strength from God to lead his people for many years, inspiring his people to work for their Church and for the glory of God. Following the peace pact of 1958, he had the good fortune to guide the destiny of the unified Malankara Orthodox Church.

Apart from consecrating twelve Metropolitans, and ordaining more than a thousand priests and deacons, he founded and consecrated many churches. As the Catholicos of the East, he officiated in the consecration of Holy Mooron (anointing oil) at the Old Seminary on 22 April 1932 and on 20 April 1951. On 2 November 1947 he declared Parumala Mar Gregorios and Catholicos Eldho Mor Baselios as saints.

From his time onwards the offices of Catholicos and Malankara Metropolitan were united in one and the same person. Baselius Geevarghese II died on 3 January 1964 at Develokam Aramana and was laid to rest beside the Devalokam Aramana Chapel. Every year the Church observes his feast on 3 January.

== Succession ==
Oriental Orthodox titles
Preceded by Geevarghese Mar Dionysius of Vattasseril; 1909–1934	Malankara Metropolitan of the Malankara Orthodox Syrian Church; 1934–1964	Succeeded by Baselios Augen I 1964–1975
Preceded by Baselios Geevarghese I 1925–1928	Catholicos of the East; 1929–1964	Succeeded by Baselios Augen I 1964–1975
