= Seven churches of Saint Thomas =

Group of Christian churches in southern India

Ēḻarappaḷḷikaḷ (Seven and a half churches or Seven royal churches, alternatively spelled Ezharappallikal (pronounced [eːɻɐɾəpːɐɭːikɐɭ]), or the Seven churches of Saint Thomas, are the seven Saint Thomas Christian congregations or places of worship which are traditionally believed to be established by Thomas the Apostle in the Malabar Coast of South India. Local tradition holds that Thomas arrived in India in AD 52 as part of his evangelical missions and founded Christian communities in the then major settlements of Malabar. The seven churches are traditionally listed as these pioneering churches. The conventional list of the churches counts those in Kodungallur, Kollam, Palayur, Kottakkavu, Kokkamangalam, Niranam and Nilackal as the seven churches of Saint Thomas. In addition, Thiruvithamcode is often listed as a 'half church', and hence the name 'Seven-and-half churches'.

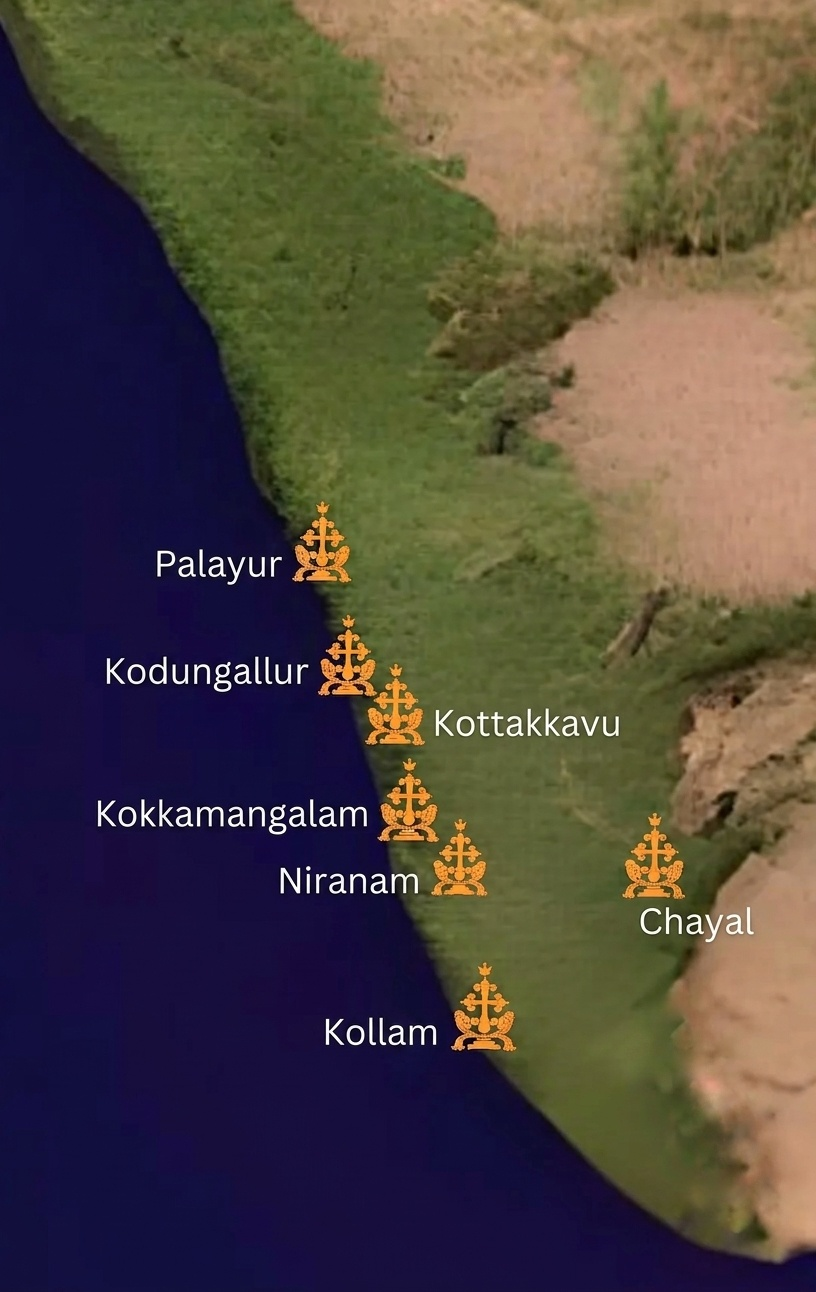
Geographical locations of the seven churches according to Ramban Pattu.

== History ==
The conventional list of seven Thomasine churches which are recognised by all the modern Saint Thomas Christian denominations are Kodungallur, Kollam, Palayur, Kottakkavu, Kokkamangalam, Niranam and Nilackal. Thiruvithamcode is often added with this list as a 'half church' owing to its relatively smaller size. However, many of the ancient records display varying lists of churches which alternatively include Mylapore, Edappally and Malayattur among the seven churches. Meanwhile, some modern church historians have included Arthat, Kothamangalam, Mylacombu and Aruvithura to their revisionist lists in addition to or replacing those in the conventional list.

== Kodungallur ==
=== Tradition ===
Kodungallur is considered to be the first church to have been established by Saint Thomas on the Malabar Coast. The region has had multiple names including Muziris, Muciri, Muyirikkodu, Shengala, Shinjli, Makotai, Makothevarpattanam, Mahodayapuram and Cranganore at different times. It was also known to be the most important of the Nazrani churches. Ramban Pattu calls this region as Maliankara. Tradition says that Thomas baptised the King of Kodungallur and his household along with 40 Jews in Kodungallur. Tradition also suggests that Kodungallur rose to prominence after weakening of the Christianity in the Coromandel Coast, especially Mylapore. For centuries, Kodungallur housed the Metropolitans of the Saint Thomas Christians.

=== History ===
==== Prominence ====
Saint Thomas Christians of Malabar were geographically divided into two groups based on their proximity to their two main trade centres, namely Makothevarpattanam and Kurakkeni Kollam. The church in Kodungallur was also a significant pilgrimage site for them. The stone carved relief cross, called the Saint Thomas cross, present there was highly venerated among the Nazranis. Francisco Roz, the 17th century Portuguese archbishop in Malabar, documents that three churches were present in Kodungallur. These were dedicated to Saint Mary, Saint Thomas and Saint Cyriacus the child Martyr. Roz also says that Cranganore was the most ancient Metropolitan see in whole India. The East Syriac lectionary of the Pauline epistles copied in 1301 at Kodungallur also documents about the Church of Saint Cyriacus the Martyr in Shengala and the then Metropolitan Yacob of India.

==== Fall ====
Kodungallur maintained its prominence roughly until the rise of Portuguese hegemony there. The Saint Thomas Christians of Kodungallur started being oppressed by the Portuguese who started a series of attempts aimed at latinizing their rite and steering their socio-economic relationships with non-Christians. The Portuguese also attempted to bring them under their authority and to enforce their monopoly over pepper and other merchandise. This led to the initially gradual and later rapid efflux of Nazranis to interior settlements. However, Kodungallur city and its three churches persisted until 1524 when the city fell to the Zamorin and his Muslim militia, who arsoned all three of the churches. This led to the mass exodus of Saint Thomas Christians from Kodungallur to different interior localities. The venerated Saint Thomas Cross is said to be transferred, first to Kaduthuruthy and ultimately, to Kottayam where they are preserved till date.

=== Contemporary churches ===
==== Saint Thomas Pontifical Shirine ====
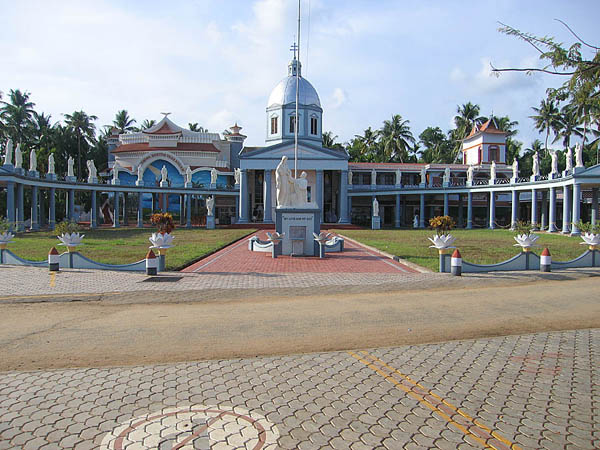

This is a shrine, administered by CMI monks of the Syro-Malabar Church, located in Azheekode in Kodungallur. It houses the bone fragments of Saint Thomas brought from Ortona Basilica in Rome, where the apostle's remains are preserved.

==== Saint Michael's Cathedral, Kottappuram ====
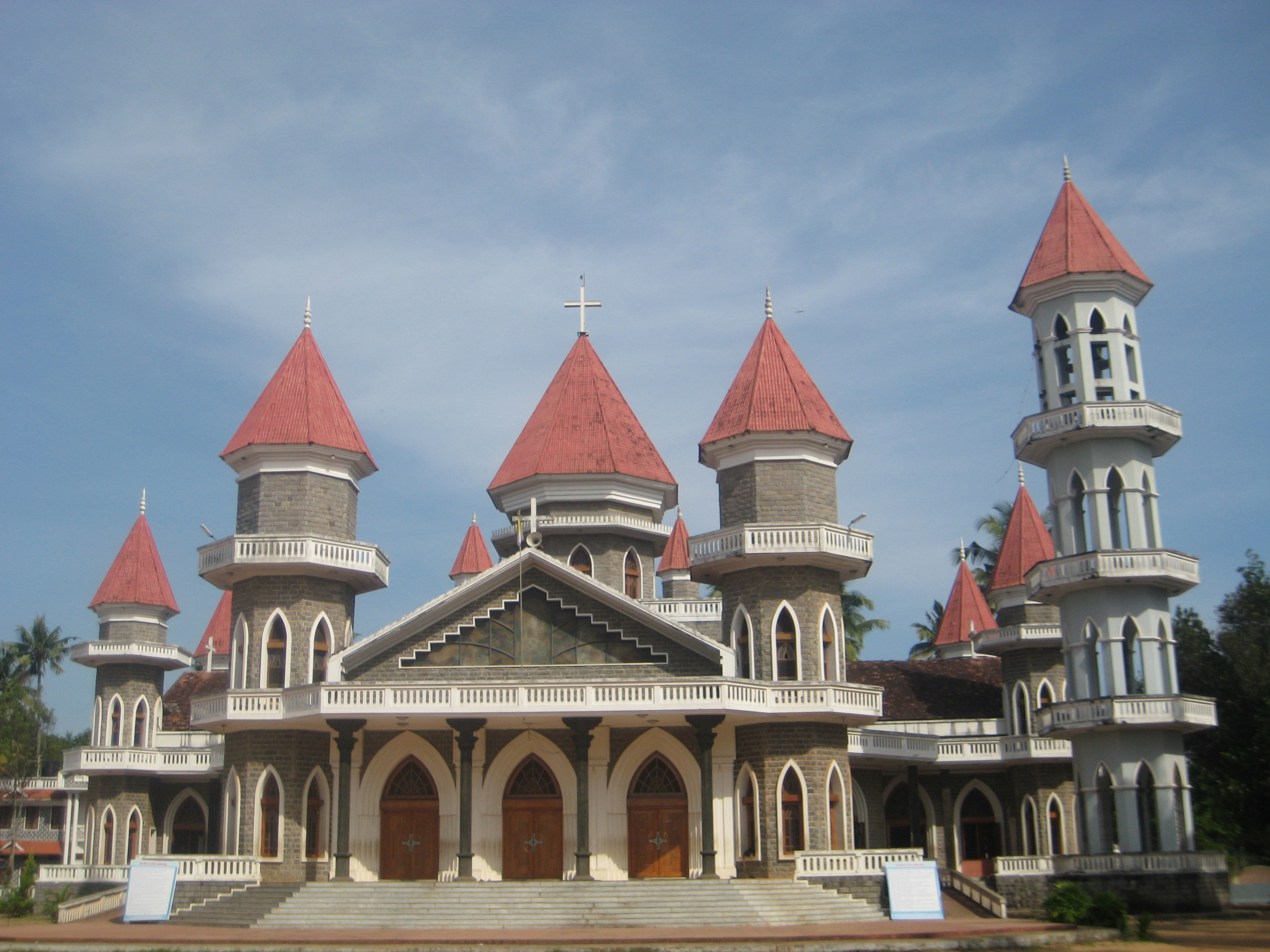

It is a major church located in Kodungallur and is the cathedral of Roman Catholic diocese of Kottappuram. The church is established in 1890 and is thus the oldest standing church in Kodungallur.

==== Saint Mary's Church ====
It is Syro-Malabar parish church located in Kodungallur. Established in 1984, it belongs to the Eparchy of Irinjalakkuda.

==== Puthenchira Church ====
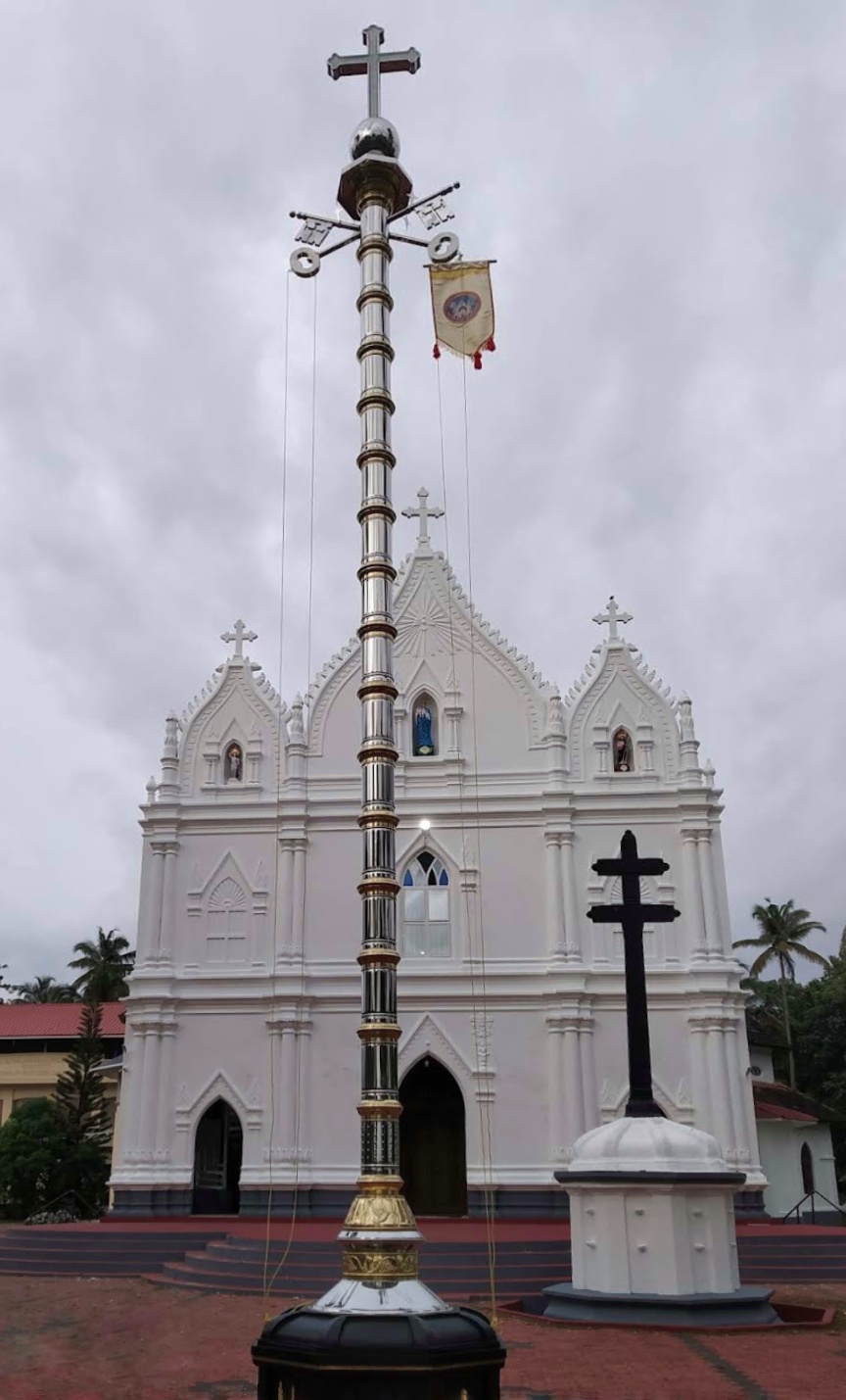

It is an old Syro-Malabar Church located in Puthenchira, about 10 km from Kodungallur. Local tradition says that the church was founded in the fifth century AD. Earliest documented evidence for the church goes back to the middle 17th century and can be even traced back to the early decade of the century. As such it is the oldest of the churches in and around the proximity of Kodungallur. The church also served as the cathedral of the Archdiocese of Cranganore. In 1787, it became one of the signatory churches in the Angamaly Padiyola that asserted Syro-Malabar autonomy from the Latin hegemony.

== Kollam ==
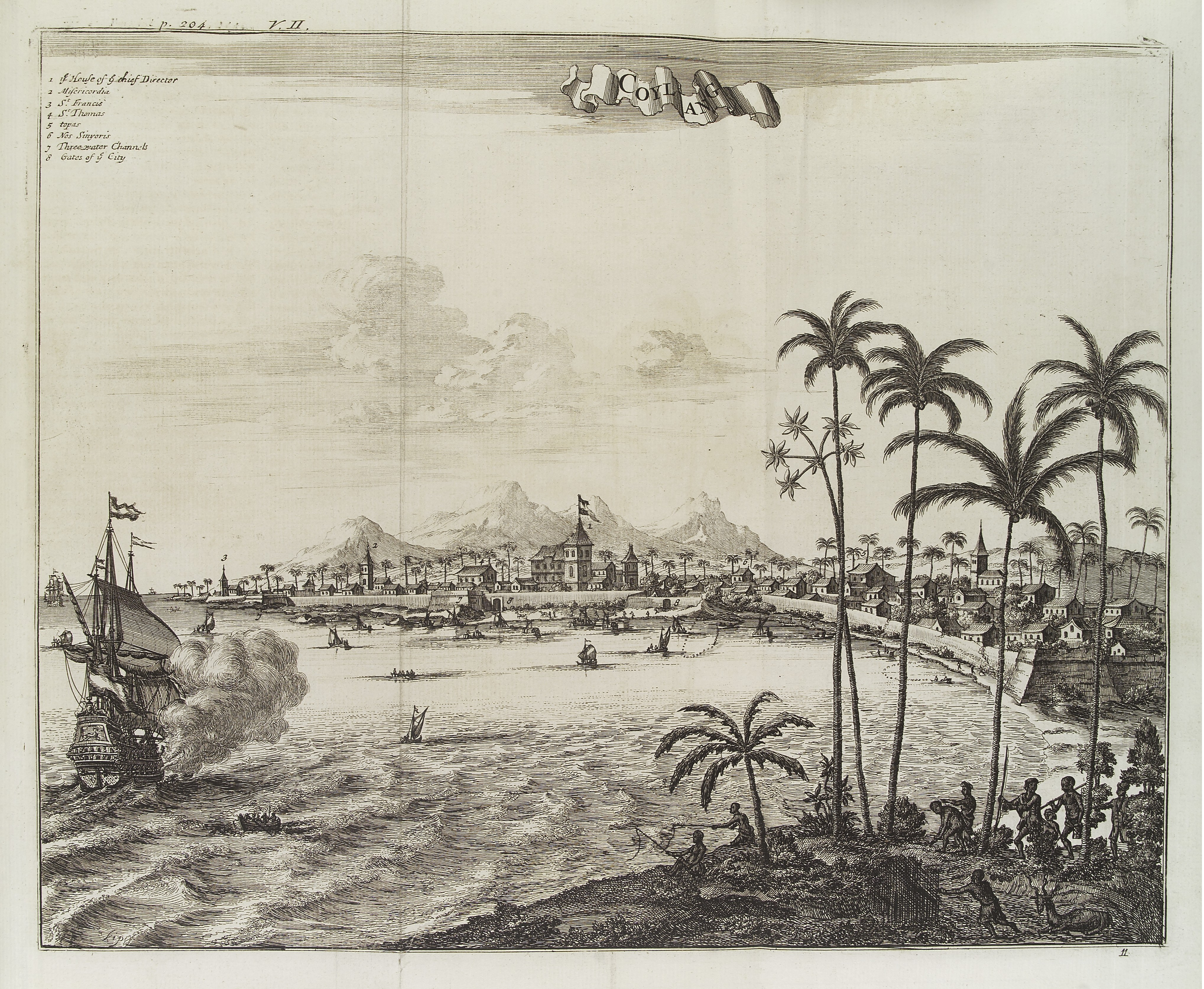
A depiction of the Kollam port city in 1682. The old Kollam church is also sketched in this image.

=== Tradition ===
Kollam is one of the most prominent of the churches attributed to the apostolic mission of Saint Thomas, being the most documented and influential among the seven Thomasine churches. According to the Ramban Pattu, it is counted second immediately after Kodungallur. Tradition says that the original church fell into disrepair and was eventually rebuilt by Sabor and Aphroth, the Persian brother bishops highly venerated by the Saint Thomas Christians.

=== History ===
The documented history of the Kollam church begins with the Tarisappalli Copper Plates of AD 849. The European travellers who consequently visited Malabar have also left their accounts of the Kollam Church and its community. The ancient church was located in Tangassery in Kollam.

==== Tarisappalli Copper Plates ====
These plates were issued by the King of Venad, Ayyanatikal Thiruvatikal, a governor of the Chera Empire under Sthanu Ravi Kulashekhara Perumal. It was issued to Maruvan Sapir Iso, a wealthy trade magnate in Kollam, in the name of the church of the Tarisais established by Iso da Tapir. The plates granted the Nazrani church of Kollam with land, property and servants along with exclusive rights to collect taxes and self-governance. This is one of the most ancient documents discovered from Malabar and is the earliest of the native documentations for the presence of Christianity in South India.

==== Early Roman Catholic missions ====
These are the most significant of the sources for the subsequent history of the church in Kollam. These include the accounts by Marco Polo, Jordanus Catalani and Giovanni Marignolli. Marco Polo, the 13th century Venetian traveller, documented the 'Nestorian' Christian presence in Kollam diring his visit.

Jordanus Catalani, the fourteenth century Roman Catholic missionary and bishop, documents the strong veneration of Saint Thomas among the Christians in Kollam. Pope John XXII appointed him as the bishop for Kollam and sent a letter to the leader of the Kollam Nazranis on 5 April 1330 which is attached to his work, Mirabilia Descripta, indicating the existence of an organized Saint Thomas Christian presence in Kollam. Giovanni Marignolli documents the presence of Christians in Kollam and their monopoly over the harvesting, shipment and trade of pepper corns.

==== Colonial Period ====
Kollam finds mention as one if the mist important settlements of Saint Thomas Christians of Malabar in the letter of East Syriac bishops in early sixteenth century. Denha, one of the East Syriac bishops, took Kollam as his residence. In 1503, Portuguese sailor Alfonso de Albuquerque documented in detail about the old church in Kollam during his visit to Kollam. He says that the church was dedicated to 'Our Lady of Mercy' and had three altars among which the central one with a golden cross and side ones each with a silver cross. He further states that the Syrian bishops who were brothers and highly venerated among Nazranis were entombed near its altar. Albuquerque also notes the socio-economic previleges that were granted to the Nazranis in Kollam. Giovanni de Empoli, one of Albuquerque's colleagues, adds that Kollam had a population of around 3000 native Christians and that the Christians believed that their church was established by Thomas the Apostle.

The Portuguese often engaged in violent clashes with the Muslims and Nairs in Kollam which eventually led to the burning of the church sometime after 1505. This coupled with their hegemonic latinization programme eventually forced the Saint Thomas Christians to shift to Kollam's interior, where they built for themselves a new church. Meanwhile the old church was completely occupied by the Portuguese who built their fort surrounding it by 1519. Portuguese Augustinian friar Antonio Gouvea documents in his book, the Jornada, the visit and activities of his protagonist Alexis de Menesis, the Portuguese Archbishop of Goa, to the old and new churches of Kollam and the other churches nearby.

By the middle of the seventeenth century, the Dutch defeated the Portuguese and took control of their fort and the buildings nearby in Kollam. By the latter half of the eighteenth century, these were transferred to the British, who levelled multiple parts of the debate. By 1863, the structural parts of church were non-extant during the visit by Thomas Whitehouse who concludes that church was engulfed by the encroaching sea.

=== Existing churches ===
==== Kollam Kadisha Church ====
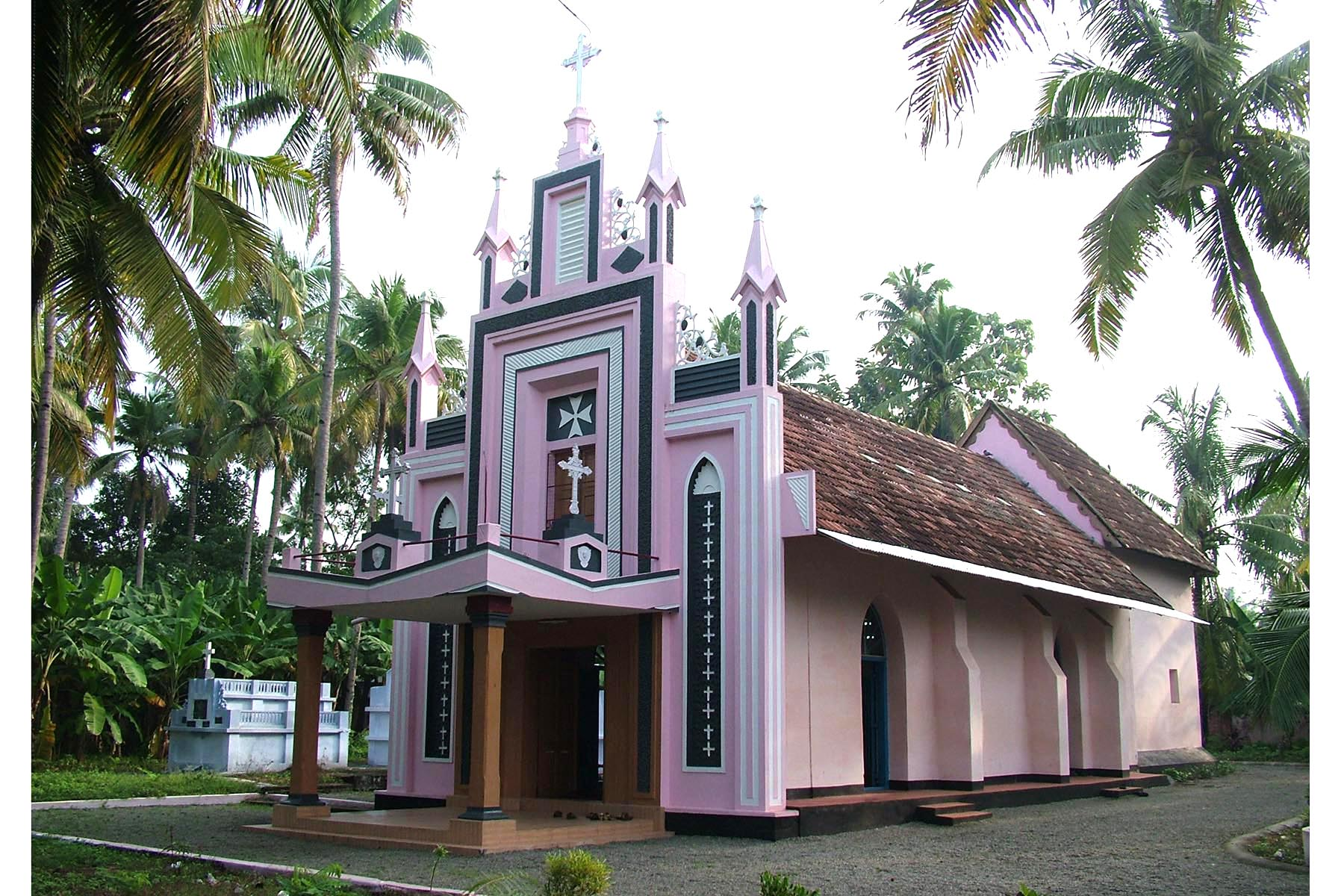

This is a church located in Jonakapuram, Kollam. It is under the private ownership of the Kollākkāran Mothalaly Syrian family and is affiliated with the Malankara Orthodox Syrian Church. It is called Kādīsā Church as it is dedicated to Sts Sabor and Aphroth.

This church claims to be the direct continuation of the church that the Nazranis of Kollam established after they shifted to interior Kollam due to conflicts with Portuguese in their old church. It was established around 1519. During that period, the Portuguese tried to occupy the rights according to Tarisappalli Copper Plates as they had occupied the old Tarisappalli church. However the local rulers repudiated their claim and instead acknowledged the Nazranis as its true heirs. Since these rights were applied thereafter based in this Kādīsa church, the plates also came to be called Kādīsāppalli Copper Plates.

This church finds mention in old Portuguese accounts of the churches of the Nazranis and also houses ancient inscriptions. One such inscription documents the copying of the Tarisappalli Copper Plates in AD 1651.

==== Our Lady of Purification Church, Kollam{{ ====
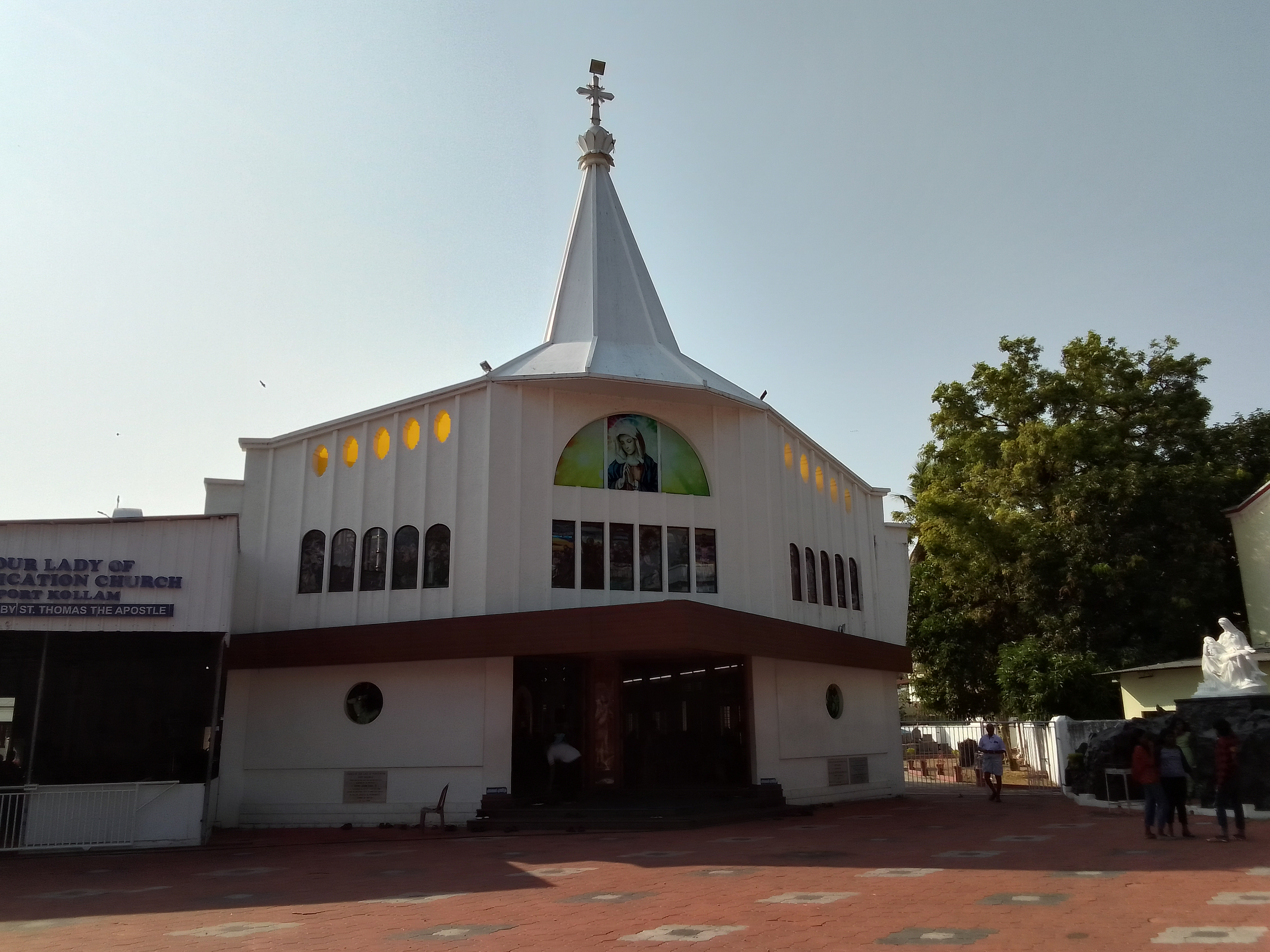

The Port Kollam church is Roman Catholic church established in Port Kollam to serve its Roman Catholic Latin population when the Portuguese fort and the ancient Tarisappalli therein were occupied by the Dutch Protestants.

This church finds mention in the Nineteenth century accounts of the churches in Kollam by Thomas Fanshaw Middleton and Thomas Whitehouse.

This is currently a shrine and a parish church of the Roman Catholic Diocese of Kollam and claims to be continuation of the original church of Kollam. However its existence can be dated back no earlier than the eighteenth century and the current structure dates back to 1993.

==== Thevalakkara Church ====
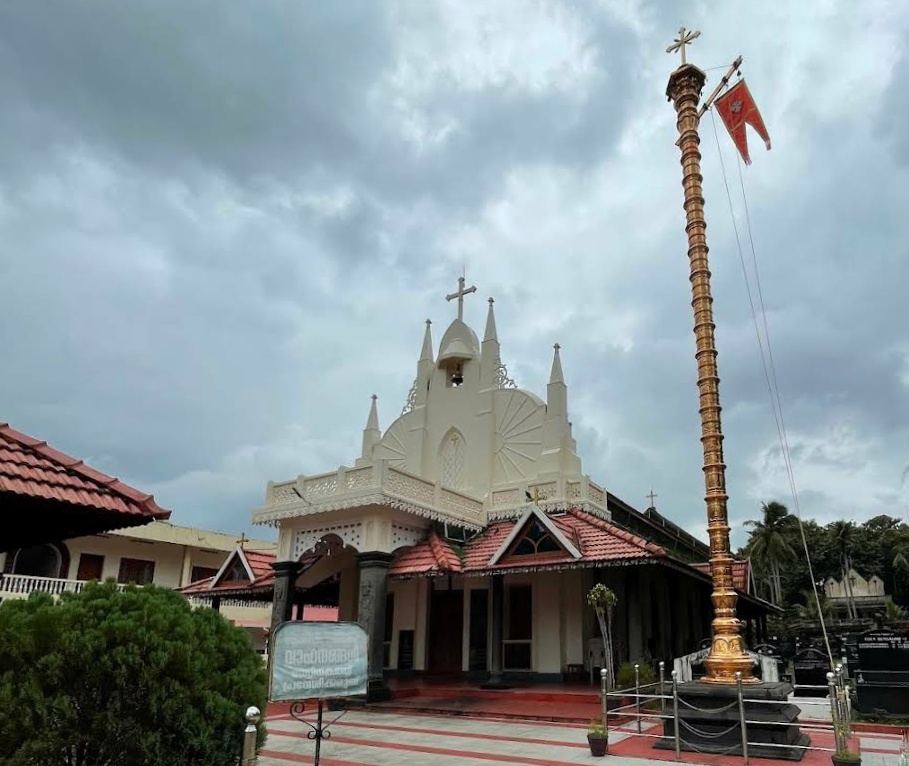

This is an ancient church located in Thevalakkara under the Malankara Orthodox Syrian Church. It is thereby the most ancient of the existing churches in and around Kollam. Local tradition holds that the Christian community here originated out of the old Kollam church founded by Saint Thomas. Tradition also holds that it was established by Sabor and Aphroth in the ninth century. This church houses the tomb of Mar Abo, a Persian monk and saint.

The Portuguese document Jornada of Alexis Menesis by Gouvea gives an account of the Thevalakkara Church in the early Seventeenth century. It documents that the Tarisappalli Copper Plates were then preserved in this church and that it was the most significant settlement of the Nazranis in the region during that period.

== Palayur ==
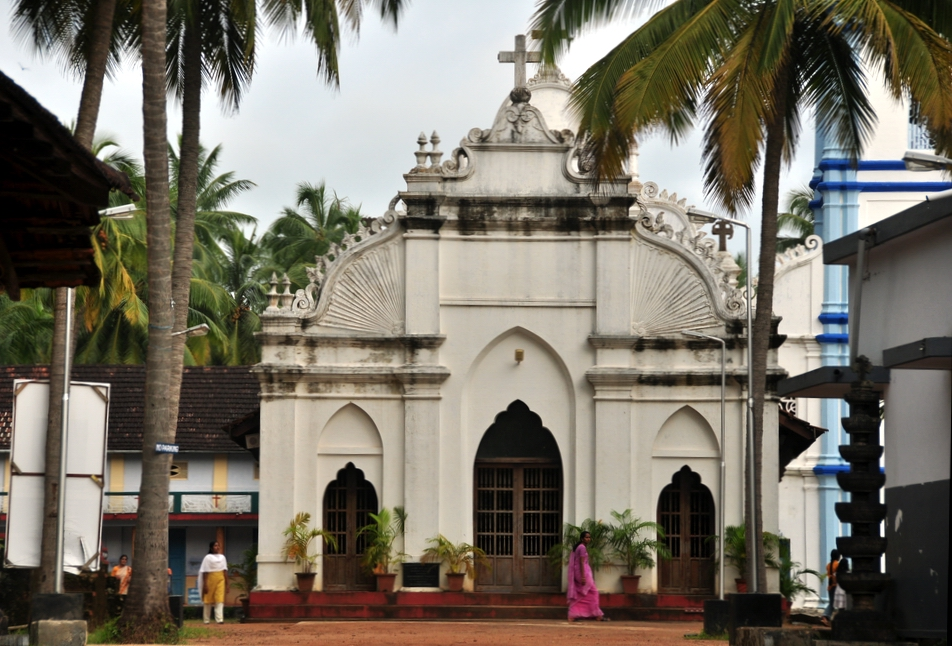

Palayur Saint Thomas church is a Syro-Malabar Church located in Palayur near Chavakkad in Thrissur district, Kerala. Palayur is the oldest of the extant three churches among the seven Thomasine churches of Malabar.

=== Tradition ===
Palayur church known to be the oldest of the extant churches in India. Tradition holds that Palayur was a ancient port and a hub of Jews and Brahmins in Malabar. According to tradition, Thomas the Apostle came to Palayur to evangelise the Jews there, converting many of them to Christianity. He is said to have encountered Brahmins at a major temple located in Palayur and performed miracles in front of them, which led to their conversion to Christianity. The temple is said to have been then appropriated as a church. The remaining Brahmins left the place, cursing it, thereby calling it Sāpakkātu or 'cursed forest'. The baptised Jews and gentiles are thereby considered to be the base of the Palayur church.

=== History ===
Ancient documents call Palayur as Palur. It housed one of the major settlements of Jews in Malabar, with scholars such as M. Jussay saying that a Jewish settlement was probably present in Palayur in the First century AD. Palayur became one of the most prominent Christian settlements due to its engagement with maritime trade and the inland waterways that connected it with Kodungallur. However, following the collapse of the Chera Perumal empire, its geographic isolation in the expanding kingdom of the Zamorin away from the rest of the Nazrani settlements weakened its influence. Maritime trade in the region was taken over by the more influential and populous Muslim counterparts. The Christian population in Palayur diminished as the major Christian families of Palayur gradually shifted to their three interior agrarian and trading settlements namely, Mattom, Enammavu and Kunnamkulam, as noted by Campori in 1604. However Palayur maintained its socio-economic privileges and its status as the cradle of Christianity in the north and as a shrine of Saint Cyriacus the child martyr, evident from the extant post Fifteenth century copper plates and documents.

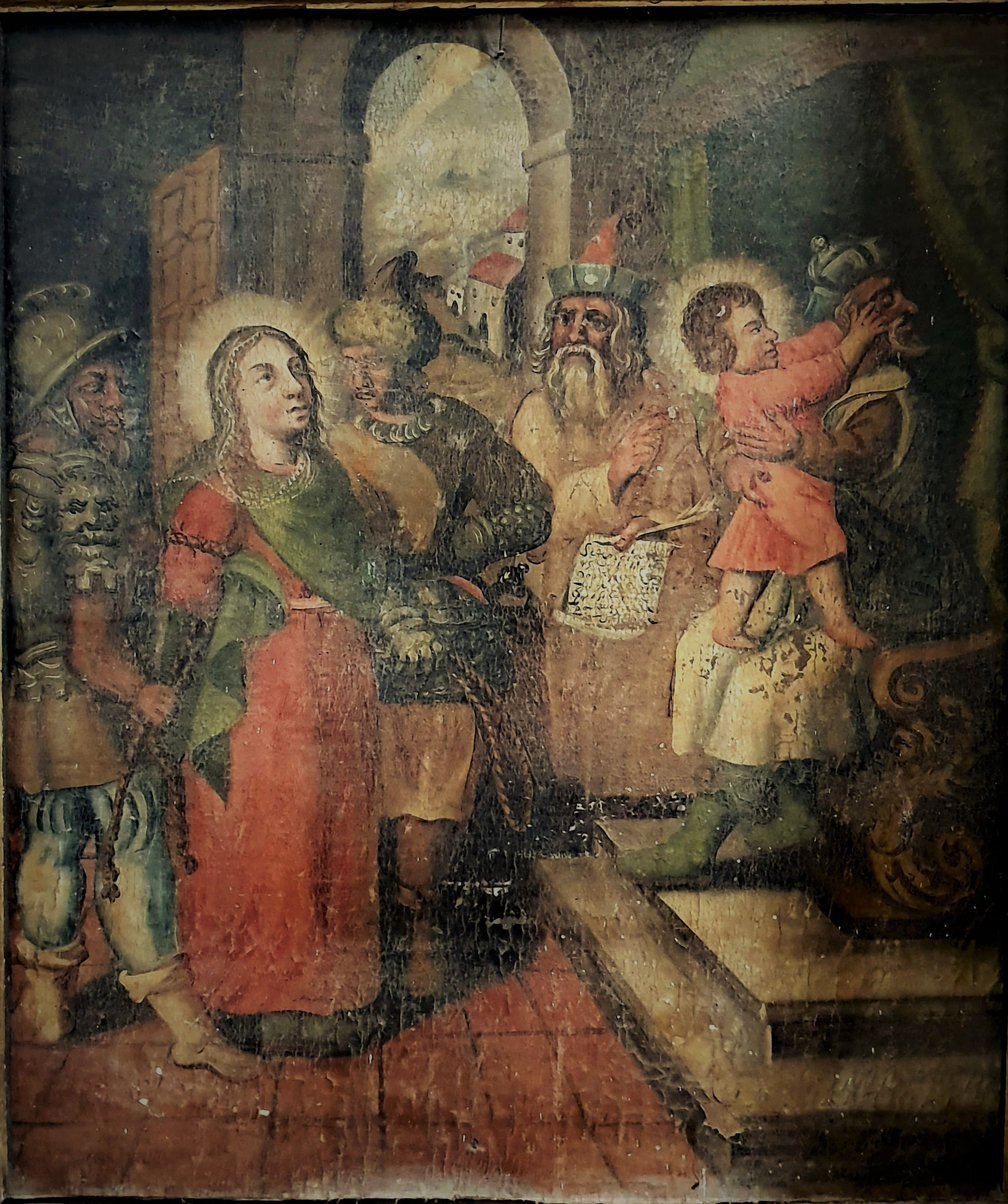
Cyriacus and his mother Julietta

Palur is acknowledged as one of the three major settlements of Saint Thomas Christians alongside Kodungallur and Kollam in the letter of the East Syriac bishops in the early Sixteenth century.

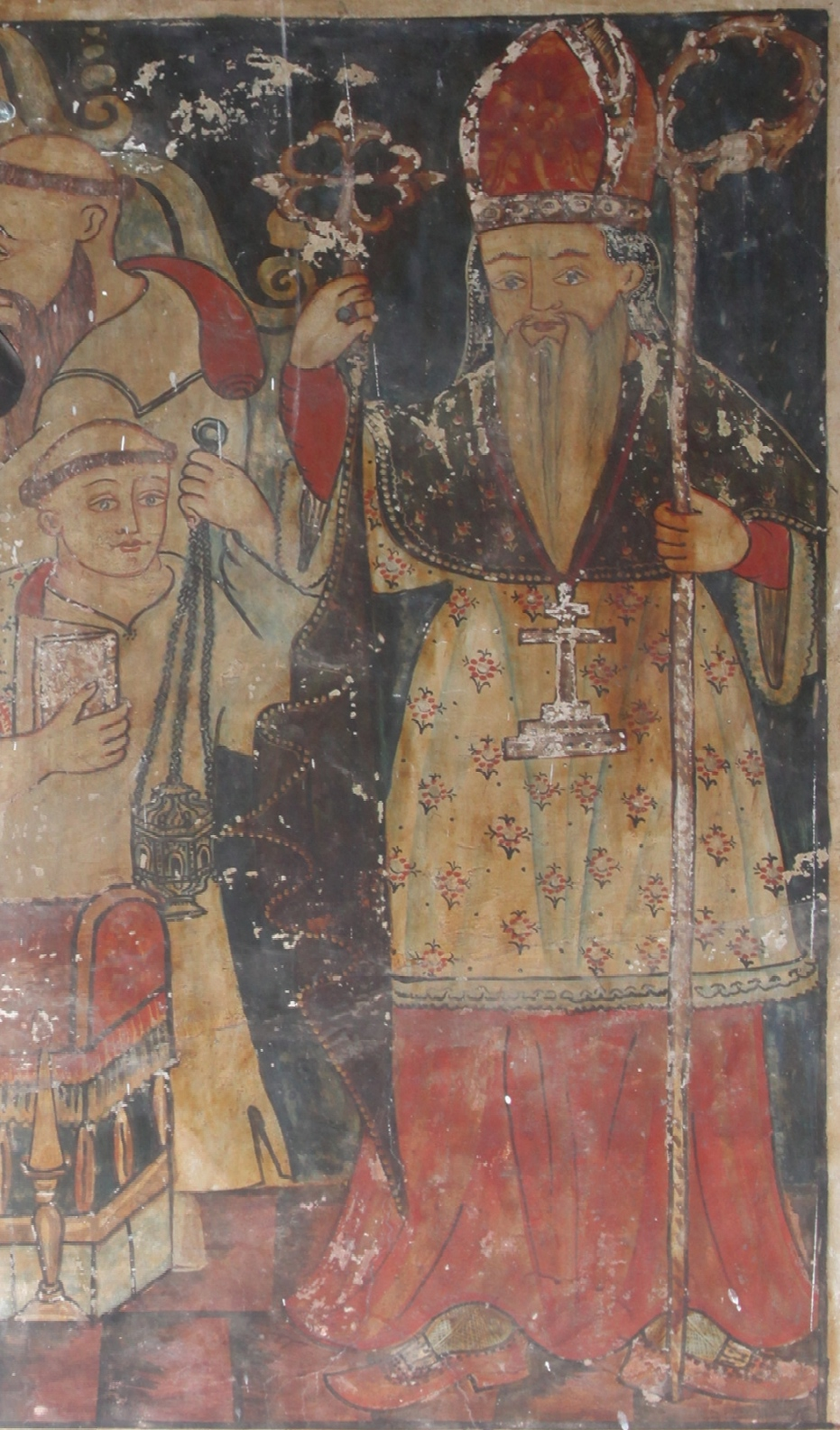
Gīwargīs of Christ

This significance of Palur is further exhibited as it was selected as the episcopal see of the Coadjutor of Metropolitan Abraham as part of his succession plans involving Archdeacon Gīwargīs of Christ. Nevertheless, this plan eventually failed, and Portuguese held the Synod of Diamper in 1599 and succeeded in suppressing the Eastern Catholic jurisdiction in India.

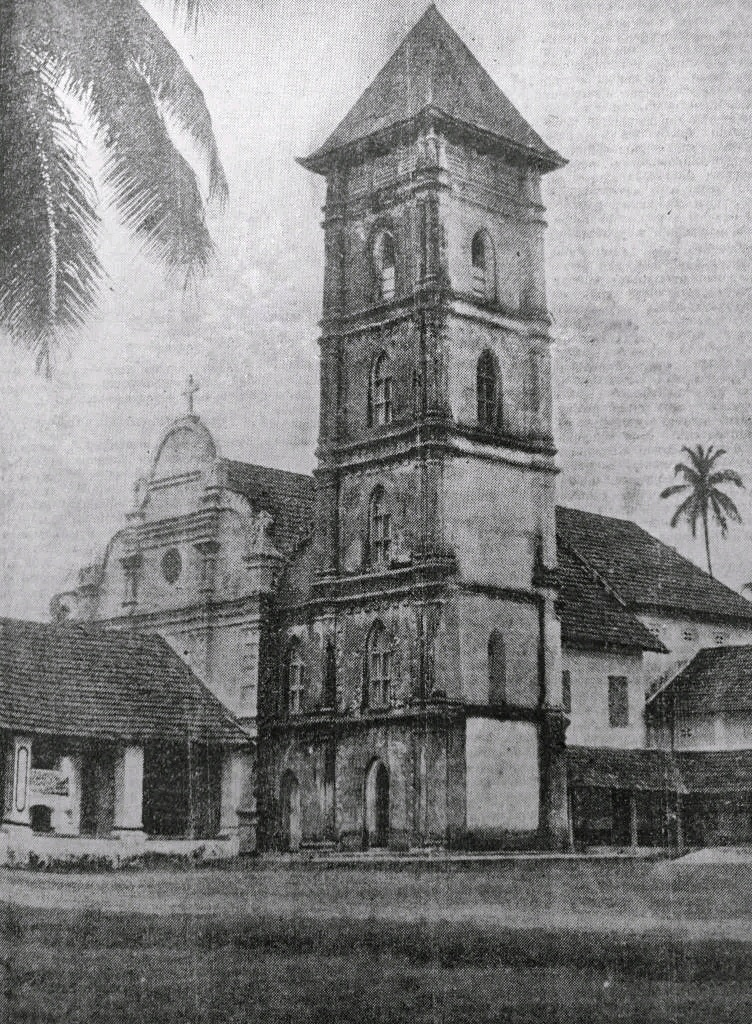

Following the Synod of Diamper, the church of Palur became the melting pot of Nazrani traditionalism and Portuguese influence. Jornada of Menesis documents how the Portuguese tried to win over the four churches in Zamorin's kingdom through their interactions with the Palur church. However, these Portuguese attempts were met with repudiation from them, as they regarded the East Syriac tradition of Saint Thomas as equal to the Roman tradition of Saint Peter. The Portuguese interprets their position to be 'iron-bound under the law of Thomas'.

Fransisco Roz performed episcopal visit to Palur where he held a meeting with the Zamorin in 1602. Palur appears first in Roz's account of miraculous churches in his report dated 1604. He also documents that the then extant wooden church is about 300 year old. Campori states that it is from Palur that the remaining three Christian villages of the kingdom originated. At Roz's request, the Jesuit friar Giacomo Fenichio took up the reconstruction of the Palur church and its three daughter churches in the Zamorin's territory. Fenichio notes that Palur is the 'primus' of the churches in Malabar, an appellation that Giuseppe Sebastiani repeats in 1666. Fenichio further says that the Palur church was highly venerated even by the heathens. He encased the old wooden structure with a stone building and later pulled down the wooden structure after calming the protests from the natives.

The late Eighteenth century saw the destruction of the Palayur church by the invading army of Mysore. The church remained in the condition until Tipu Sultan retreated to Seringapatnam and was consequently rebuilt. Beginning in 1948, the church underwent rapid innovations including the change of patronage from Cyriacus the child martyr to Thomas the Apostle, as part of assertion of its Thomasine origin. This eradicated the centuries old cult of Cyriacus the child martyr for childless couples, which was popular in the region.

=== Modern day ===
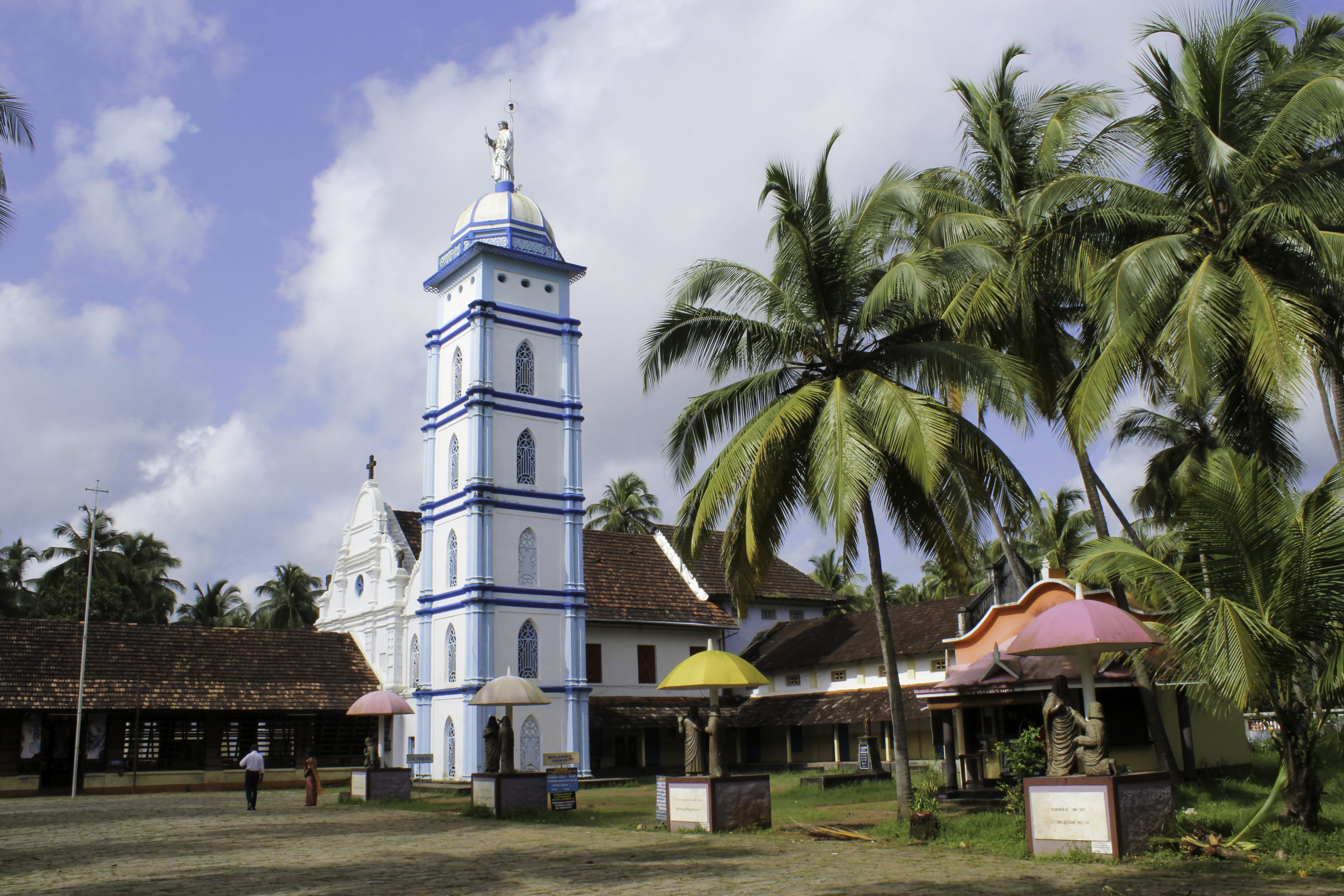

The Palayur church is presently a Major archiepiscopal pilgrimage church dedicated to Thomas the Apostle. Despite its history of reconstructions and changes, the church building retains definitive Kerala architectural features in addition to its Baroque style arches and facade and cruciform shape. Major feasts include Duqrana (July 3) and New Sunday (Sunday after Easter) dedicated to Thomas the Apostle and Tarppana perunnal in July 15 (rechristened ancient feast of Cyriacus the Martyr).

== Kottakkavu ==
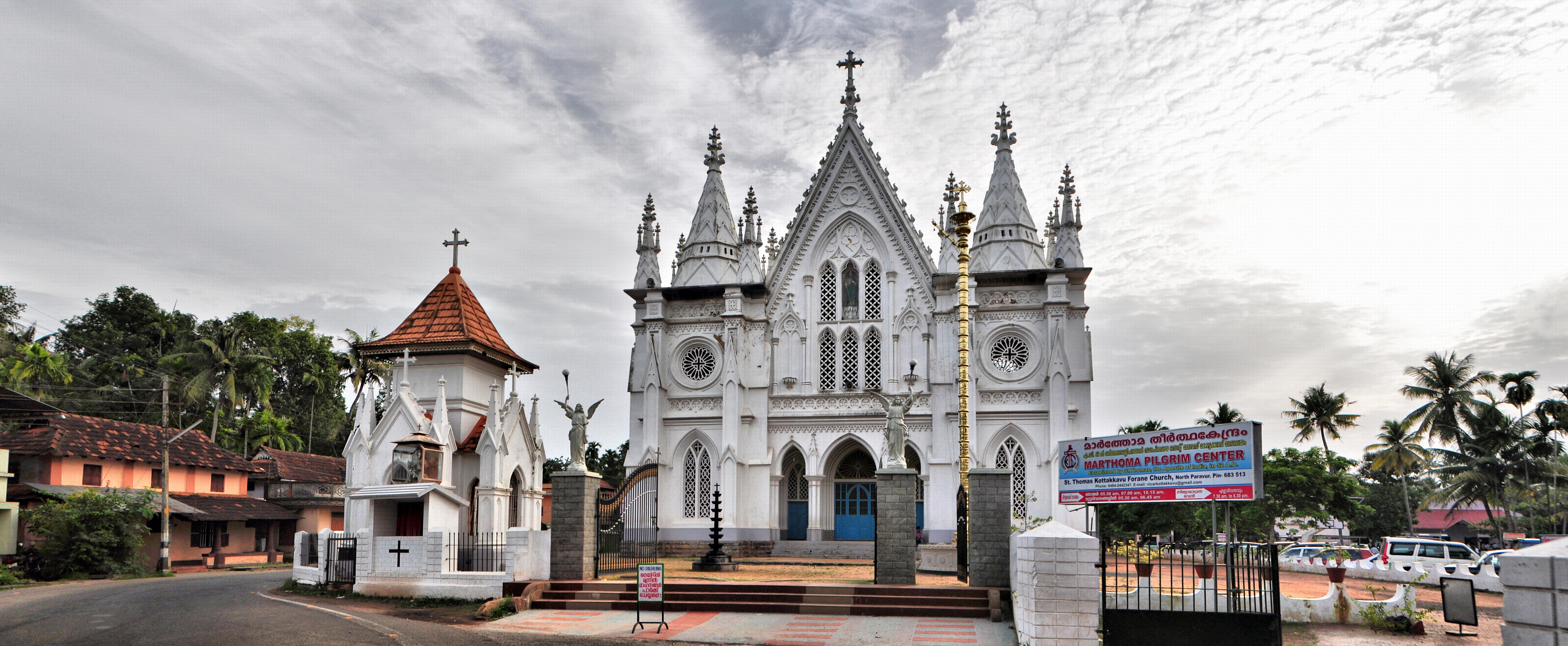
Kottakkavu church

The Kottakkavu church is a Syro-Malabar Catholic Church located in North Paravur in Ernakulam district, Kerala. It is one of the only three extant churches among the seven Thomasine churches of Malabar.

=== Tradition ===
Church tradition, most notably the Ramban Pattu, calls the church Kottakkavu or Kottakkayal. The church is said to be rebuilt twice, first in the ninth century under Sabor and Aphroth, the East Syriac bishops venerated by the Nazranis as Qandisangal, and again in 1308. A significant group of Christians who migrated out of Kodungallur is said to have settled down in Paravur.

=== History ===
Kottakkavu appears in historical accounts almost always as Pattamana Paravur or Parur. It was under the administration of the independent ruler of Paravur which owed allegiance intermittently to the Kingdom of Cochin. The ancient church of Paravur is documented to be dedicated to Saints Sabor and Aphroth in a Syriac manuscript dated to 1556.

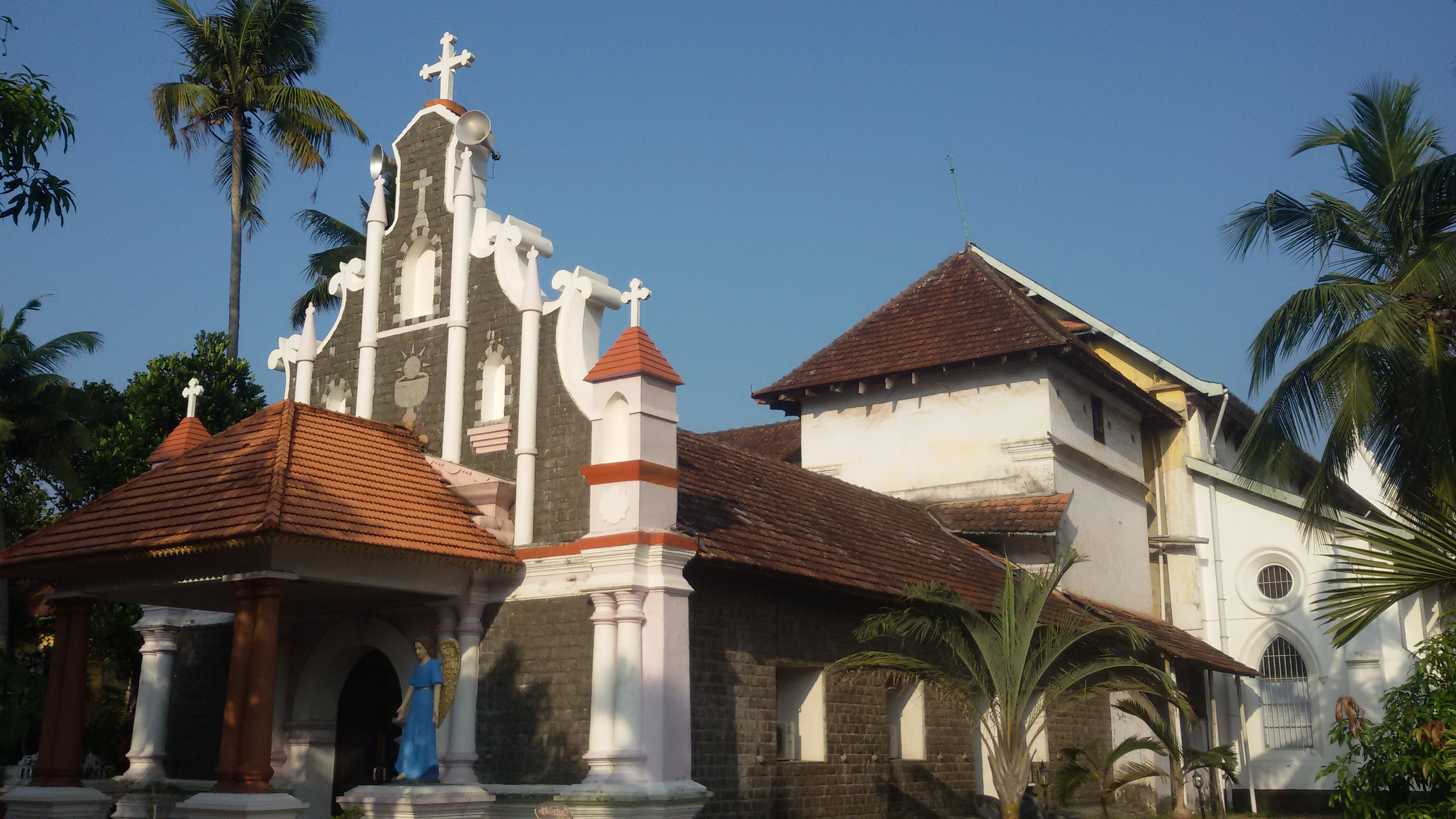
The old church

The Paravur church rose to prominence as one of the influential churches of the Nazranis owing to the growth of trade in the region. Gradually the population in the region boomed following the decline of Kodungallur. Eventually a new church was established in the new market in Paravur dedicated to Thomas the Apostle in 1565. Gouvea documents both of the churches in Paravur in Jornada. He states that one of the two churches is dedicated to 'Saint Thomas the glorious Apostle' and the other is dedicated to 'Marxabro and Marprod, the Nestorians'. He further states that each of the churches had its own distinct parishes. Paravur is reckoned as one of the Nasrani churches that vehemently opposed the latinization programme of the Portuguese Roman Catholics. Gouvea states the parishioners protested against Menesis during his visit to the church. The parishioners also prevented the two parishioners who were trained to priesthood in the Latin Rite by the Portuguese in Cranganore. In 1575, Pope Gregory XIII bestowed the church with the title of privileged altar at their request.

In 1599, Menesis changed the dedication of the old church from Sabor and Aphroth to 'All Saints' at the Synod of Diamper. However, this was met with disapproval from the parishioners. Therefore according to the advice of Fransisco Roz, it was soon changed to Gervasis and Protasis, which sounded similar to the original dedication.

Roz faced opposition and rebellion in Angamaly, which was an interior Nasrani settlement with deep connections to Metropolitan Abraham and the seat of the Archdeacon. Meanwhile, the frequent wars and political instability in Cranganore caused Roz Roz spent much of his time in Paravur as the Padroado bishop of Angamaly and as the Archbishop of Cranganore. Soon the old church became a bastion of Roman Catholicism in Malabar. A stone plaque recording the death of Roz in 1624 was discovered near the altar of the old church of Paravur. Following the Coonan Cross Oath and the subsequent schism among the Nazranis, the two emergent factions managed to maintain substantial presence in Paravur. The old church or Valiyapalli came under the Palayakur and the Puttenkur got satisfied with the new church. In the Twentieth century the old church was renamed to Thomas the Apostle.

=== Current scenario ===
The existing Kottakkavu church is currently dedicated to Thomas the Apostle and is a shrine and parish of the Syro-Malabar Church. Its earlier dedication to Gervasis and Protasis was changed to Thomas the Apostle in the mid-1900s.

==== Saint Thomas Jacobite Syrian Church ====
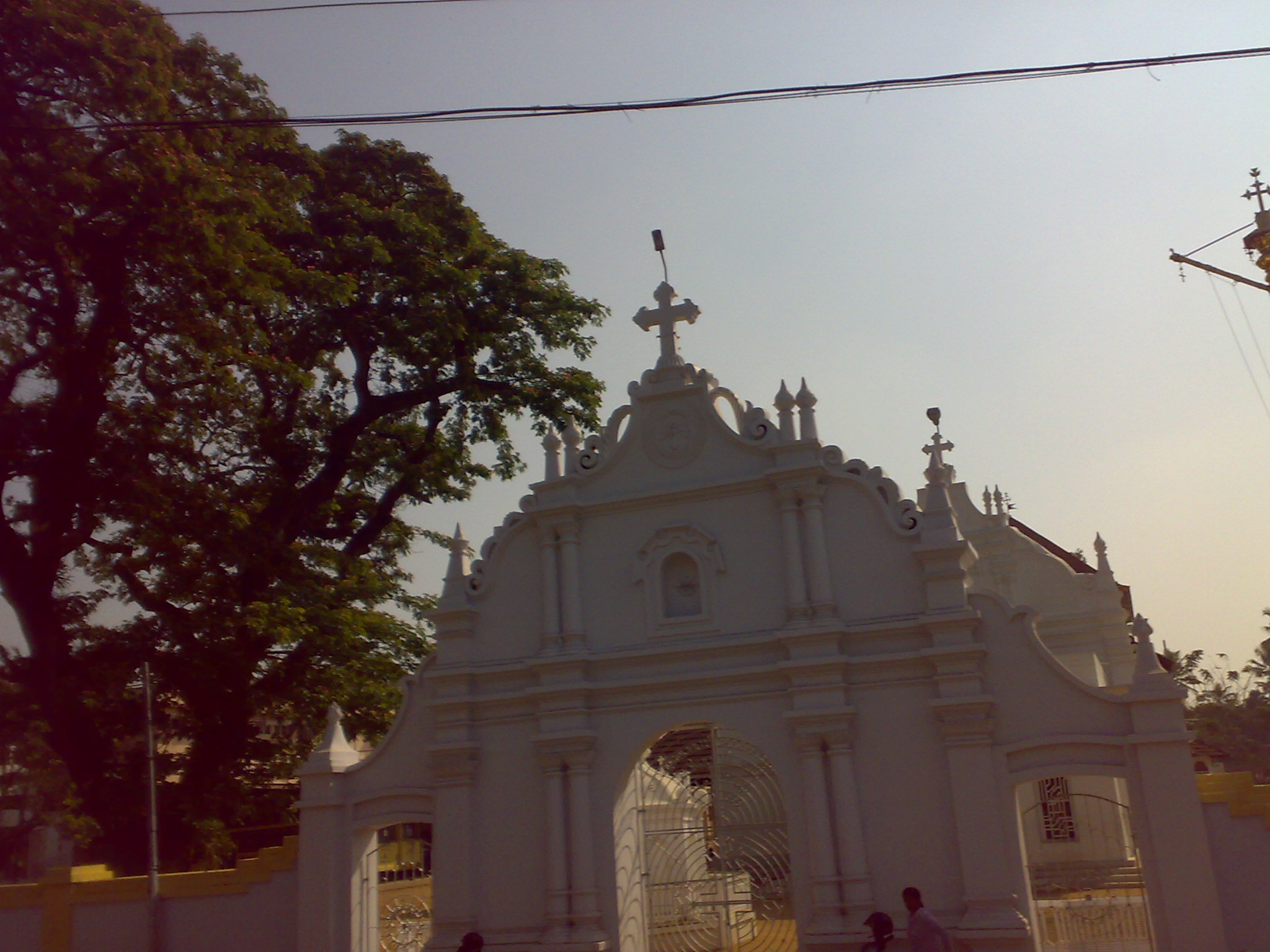

This is presently a Malankara Jacobite Syrian Orthodox church and is also called the North Paravur Cheriyapalli. It is the second church established in North Paravur and was consecrated on 29 November 1566 by Yawsep Sulaqa, the Chaldean Catholic metropolitan of India.

Following the Coonan Cross Oath and the schism among the Nazranis, this church became one of Thoma I's residences. It also became associated with Gregorius Abdal Jaleel, the Syriac Orthodox metropolitan who came at the request of Thoma in 1665. Abdal Jaleel is entombed in this church.

== Kokkamangalam ==
=== Tradition ===
Kokkamangalam Church is another church which is believed to have been founded by Thomas the Apostle. Modern Kokkamangalam is located near Pallipuram, a place near Cherthala in Alappuzha district, Kerala. Ramban Pattu states that around 1600 people converted to Christianity at that time. It is believed that Thomas arrived in Kokkamangalam and preached for about a year. Tradition also believes that he formed a Christian community in Kokkamangalam and consecrated and erected a cross for them. However, it is believed that the local Brahmins were upset by this and took the cross and threw it into the lake, where it washed up ashore on a fluvial island near Pallipuram. Pallippuram Church is the oldest extant church in the area and has been described by various writers as following the tradition of Kokkamangalam.

=== History ===
The name Kokkamangalam does not appear in the same form anywhere in European historical records, including Menezes's Jornada. If fact, the Ramban Pattu itself is the oldest record that mentions this place in the same form. Meanwhile, there are several places and Nasrani centers mentioned in the Jornada that are geographically in the same region. These are Kulasekharamangalam, Pallipuram and Vaikom.

==== Kulasekharamangalam ====
Kulasekharamangalam is the nearest literal and geographical equivalent for Kokkamangalam in the early Seventeenth century documents. The records dated to this period, especially those of European authors, usually call the regnal name Kulashekharan of the mediaeval Chera kings as Coquarangon. Therefore the usage Kokka-mangalam for Kulashekhara-mangalam is natural. Jornada of Menezes documents Colligeira mangalão as an interior river port located in the 'Pepper Kingdom' (Vatakkumkūr) in the route from Diamper (Udayamperoor) to Carturte (modern Kaduthuruthy). Menezes visited its church, dedicated to Saint Thomas, twice, before and after the Synod of Diamper. Giovanni Campori, secretary of Fransisco Roz in Malabar, calls the place Colijeira and says that it is one of the most ancient churches of Malabar belonging to the Nasranis. He further documents a war between the Kingdoms of Cochin and Vatakkumkūr which had devastated the place. The church is said to be largely deserted with only a very few Christians remaining. Malekandathil notes that Kulasekharamangalam is absent in documents dated to the Eighteenth century and later and subsequently concludes that the church must have become defunct by then.

==== Vaikkom ====
One of the most important narratives in the tradition related to the Kokkamangalam church is the cross that existed in the area and the opposition raised by the Brahmins regarding it. This description was first recorded in Jornada of Menezes. According to the traditional account, the Brahmins uprooted the cross that stood there and threw it into the river, which then washed ashore near Pallippuram, Jornada takes a slightly different narrative on this. Gouvea simply documents that most of the Christians of the Palliporão (Pallippuram) church lives in the region called Baiqueta (Vaikkom) in the opposite side of the river. The region of Baiqueta is under a temple and the Brahmins there do not let a church or cross to be allowed in the place. Therefore, the Christians there are forced to have their church instead in Palliporão.

==== Pallippuram Church ====
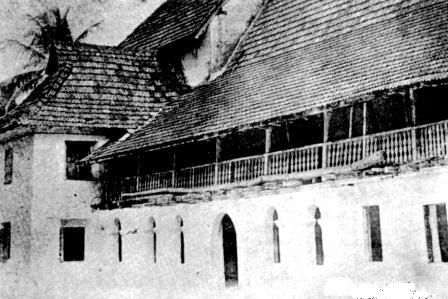
An old picture of the Pallippuram church and the seminary adjacent to it.

Pallippuram Church is a church that is believed to have formed part of the Kokkamangalam Christian community, traditionally considered to have been founded by Thomas the Apostle. It is traditionally believed that the cross erected by the Apostle Thomas in Kokkamangalam was thrown into the lake by the non-Christians there and ended up in a island called Mattūl near Pallipuram.

The Pallippuram church came under Carmelite influence following the schism among the Nasranis. The chief priests of this church were often titled Malpans, (ecclesiastical teachers). Raphael Figueredo, a Portuguese-Indian bishop of the Disclaced Carmelites who succeeded Parambil Chandy as Apostolic Vicar, is entombed in the Church. In addition, there was a seminary adjacent to the Pallippuram church. Palakkal Thoma Malpan, the founding leader of the Carmelites of Mary Immaculate, worked from this center.

=== Existing churches ===
==== Saint Mary's Church, Pallippuram ====
St. Mary's Church, Pallippuram is currently a parish church and a shrine in the Syro-Malabar Church. It is the oldest of the extant churches in the region and is therefore regarded as the successor of the Kokkamangalam church by church historians.

==== Saint Thomas Church, Kokkamangalam ====
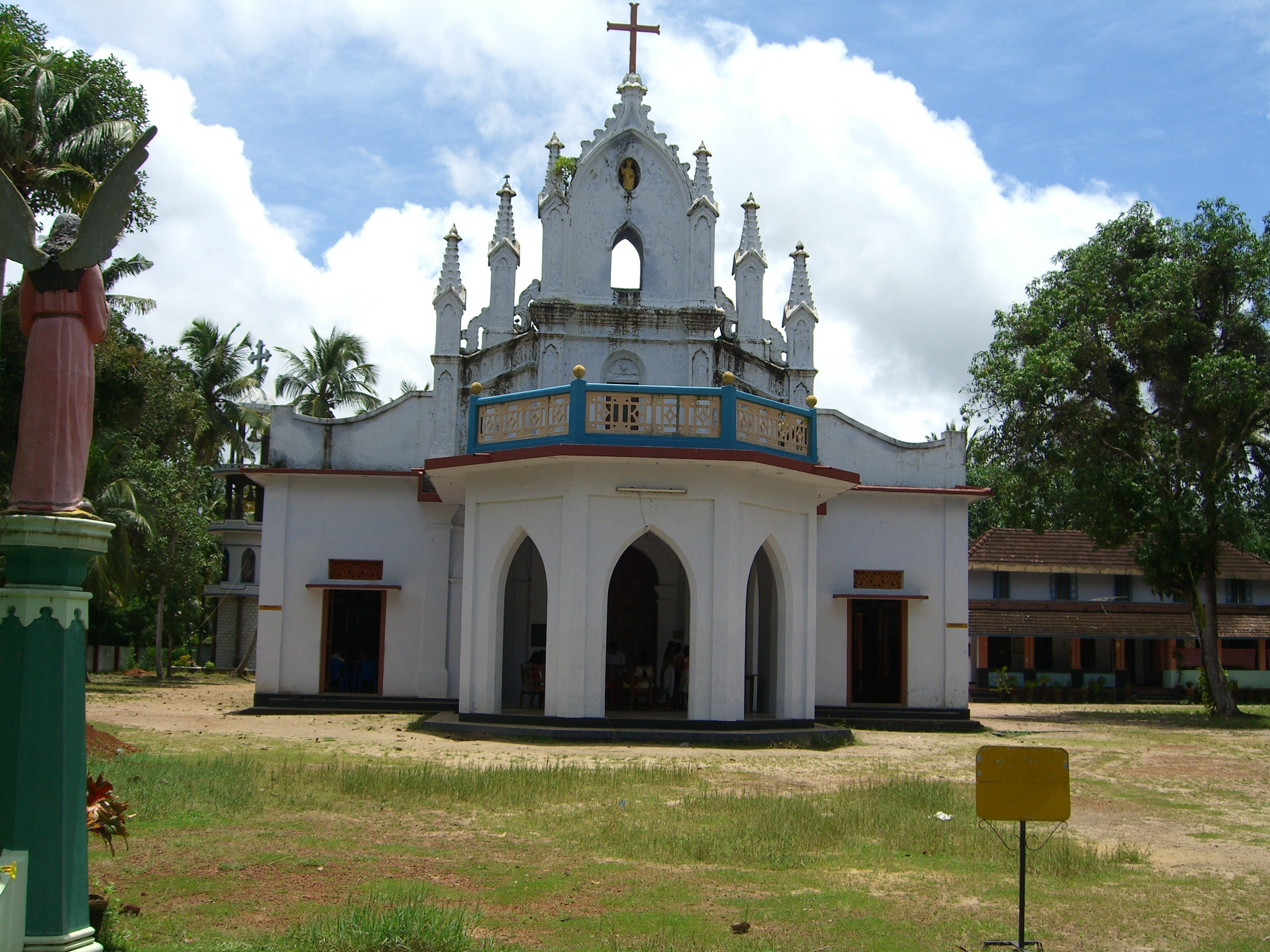
Old picture of Kokkamangalam church

The existing St. Thomas Syro-Malabar Catholic Church in Kokkamangalam was established in 1900. It is a parish church, belonging to the Pallipuram Forane of the Ernakulam-Angamaly Archeparchy, of the Church. This church attracts many pilgrims as it bears the name and is believed to be standing on the site where one of the seven and a half churches is believed to have stood.

== Niranam ==
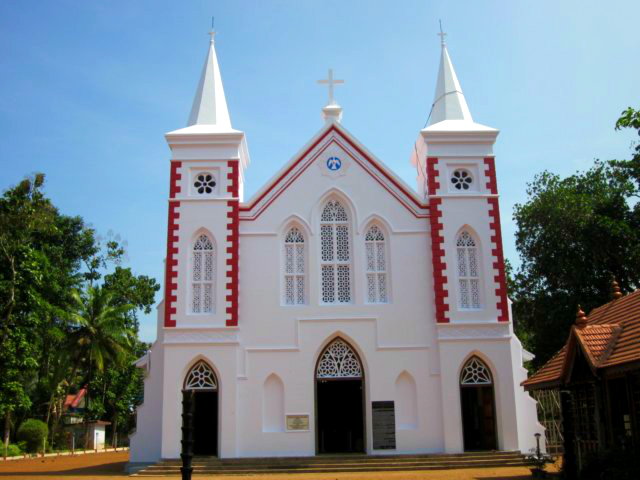
Niranam church

=== Tradition ===
Niranam Church is another prominent church that is considered one of the seven churches. The church, currently located in the Niranam area of Thiruvalla in Pathanamthitta district, is believed to have been founded by St. Thomas in 54 AD. Tradition has it that Thomas the Apostle arrived at a place called 'Thrikkalpeswaram', which was located near this area, preached there, and brought some people to the Christian faith. The belief that he erected a cross there is an important part of this tradition. However, since the Brahmins residing there expressed strong opposition to this, the Christian worship center was moved from that place to a place called Niranam, and a church was built there. The history of many prominent churches in the area begins with Niranam Church. Situated on the banks of the Kolayar River, a tributary of the Pamba River, this church has granite lamps and carvings, similar to those found in Hindu temples. Literary works such as Veeradiyan Pattukkal, Ramban Pattukkal, and Margamkali Pattu contain descriptions of ancient Niranam and its church.

=== History ===
Niranam is an agrarian region rich in backwaters, wetlands, other water sources, and vast paddy fields. This area was also believed to be an ancient trading center. Some historians even hypothesise that the Nelcynda mentioned in ancient Greek historical documents could be Niranam.

==== Udayamperoor Synod Period ====
The old church of the Nasranis in Niranam is first mentioned in the Jornada of Menesis. Alexis de Menezis' journey by water to the plains is recorded in detail in the Jornada. He visited Niranam by boat through a difficult waterway infested with crocodiles. However, Gouvea does not record any significance of the church beyond the description of the journey.

==== Coonan Cross Oath and the Pakalomattom dynasty ====
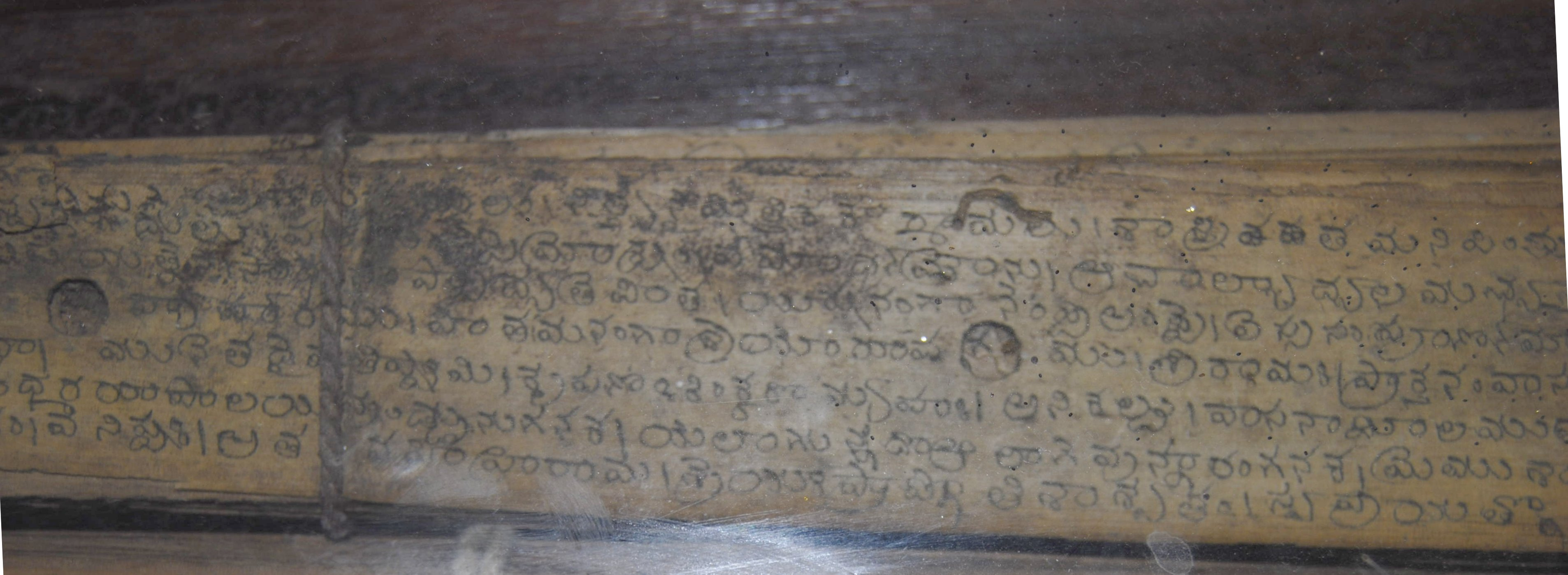
Some of the church's manuscripts

After the Coonan-Cross Oath and the subsequent split, it remained the stronghold of the Pakalomattam dynasty of the Puthankur. The first bishop to rule from Niranam was Pakalomattam Thoma IV, who died in 1686. Subsequently, several bishops from the Pakalomattom family kept Niranam as their headquarters. As the activities of missionaries from the Jacobite Church became more powerful in the 18th century, the family rule of the bishops gradually came under challenge.

Paulinus of St Bartholomew, a Carmelite missionary in Malabar, gives an account of his visit to Thoma VI 22 December 1785 at Niranam. At that time, Thoma VI was trying to join the Catholic Church.

The Latin missionaries in Malabar were not interested in Thoma VI's efforts at reunification. When these moves failed, Thoma VI was forced to reach a compromise with the Jacobite missionaries. In 1772, Thoma VI was consecrated as a bishop by the Jacobite bishops at Niranam Church under the name Dionysius.

==== British period ====
In 1806, Claudius Buchanan visited Niranam. He documents that Niranam is said to have housed an episcopal residence in the past. Buchanan records that the church was in very good condition at that time, with six priests and a wealthy parishioner.

Mathews Athanasios, who ended the reign of the Pakalomattom bishops with the support of the British made Niranam his headquarters. However in the ensuing schism with the Jacobite Patriarch, his successors lost control of the Niranam Church. Since then, both churches have been worshipping in separate churches in Niranam, with both groups claiming succession to the old church.

The dispute between the Jacobite Patriarch and the local Jacobite Malankara Metropolitan regarding the temporal authority of the church led to the split between the Bava faction and the Metran faction in the Jacobite Church in 1912. The Niranam Church also served as the venue for the main event of this, the consecration of Paulus Ivanios Murimattam as the first Maphrian Catholicos.

=== Present day ===
The ancient church and buildings have been under the control of the Malankara Orthodox Syrian Church since the schism of 1912. Niranam Church is now the headquarters of the Niranam Diocese of the Orthodox Church.

== Chayal ==
=== Tradition ===
==== Origin ====
Chayal is the last of the seven churches. It is traditionally identified with Nilackal in the eastern side of the Western Ghats. This place is located in the current Pathanamthitta district. Chayal is described in the Ramban Pattu as a Christian community located in the mountainous terrain, unlike the other six churches which are nearby the sea.

==== Decline and the great Exodus ====
The Nasranis of Chayal, who primarily made a living from trade, later began to disperse out of the place. Tradition attributes the fall of Chayal church to infestation by mysterious creatures referred to in vernacular as Vakrapuli and Perumpatta. A large section of people who migrated from Chayal settled in Kanjirapally. Another group made Kadambanadu their base. Family genealogies and local parish histories of Christian communities in Thumpamon, Ayroor and, notably, Niranam also trace their ancestry to Chayal.

=== History ===
==== Background ====
Saint Thomas Christian tradition, as recorded in the Ramban Pattu, is the unique source of the identification of Chayal with Nilackal. Non-Christian sources are largely unaware of this historical alternative name for Nilackal. Neither Chayal nor Nilackal appear in Portuguese documents as it is believed to have gone defunct back then. Nasrani tradition chiefly documented in family souvenirs says life in Chayal became difficult due to attack of Vakrapuli and Perumpatta. These also state that people from Chayal eventually migrated chiefly to Kanjirapally and Kadambanadu, and also to Thumpamon, Ayroor and, notably, Niranam.

==== Various Interpretations of the Chayal tradition ====
Nilackal settlement, surrounded by forests, was a major stopover on the trade route between the Malabar coast and the Coromandel coast. Historians are divided in interpretating the terms Vakrapuli and Perumpatta. Whitehouse believes that Vakrapuli and Perumpatta, probably mispellings of Warayen Pulli and Perin Wathu, indicate tigers and Cholera morbus which could have made life in Nilackal difficult. It is also interpreted that the rupture in their trade relations with the Pandya kingdom deprived them of their previous means of income and forced them to abandon their ancestral lands.

Sunitha Santhan interprets the local accounts that Vakrapuli and Perumpatta likely corresponds to dacoits Vikram Puli Tevar and Paraya Pattam respectively, who led two groups of robbers which frequently plundered settlements in Nilakkal and its surrounding areas, in the 13th century. She also suggests that the Mudurai invasion of Malik Kafur in 1311 could have exposed the nearby Nilakkal to plunder by the invading Muslim forces. The Great Flood of 1341 could have also contributed to the complete abandonment of Nilakkal.

==== Kanjirapally and the Nilakkal tradition ====
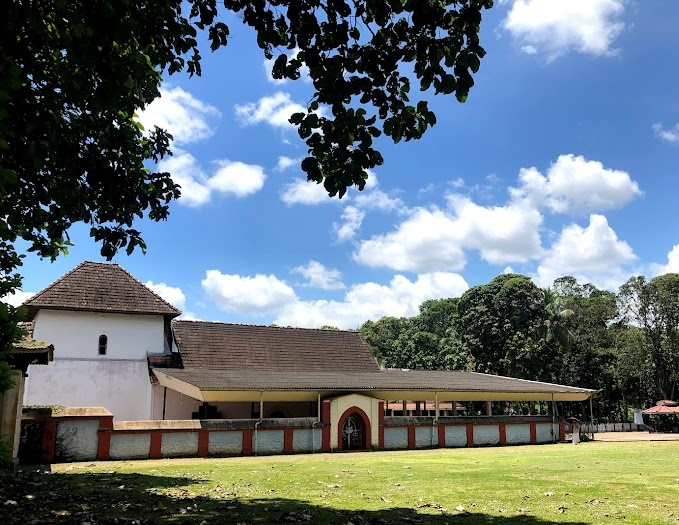
Kanjirapally Akkarapally

The foundation record of the old church in Kanjirappally, the 'Akkarapally', says that the church in Kanjirappally was established in 1449. This church was established as per the permission granted by the King of Thekkumkur, Veera Kerala Perumal, to Thommi Mappila, a Nasrani leader and merchant.

Kanjirapally was also an important trading center. This place grew into the next major hub for the movement of goods across the Western Ghats between the Malabar princely states of Kochi, Thekkumkur, and Vadakkumkur and the Pandya kingdom. There was also an old road that stretched to Mundakkayam and then across the mountains to Pandya territory.

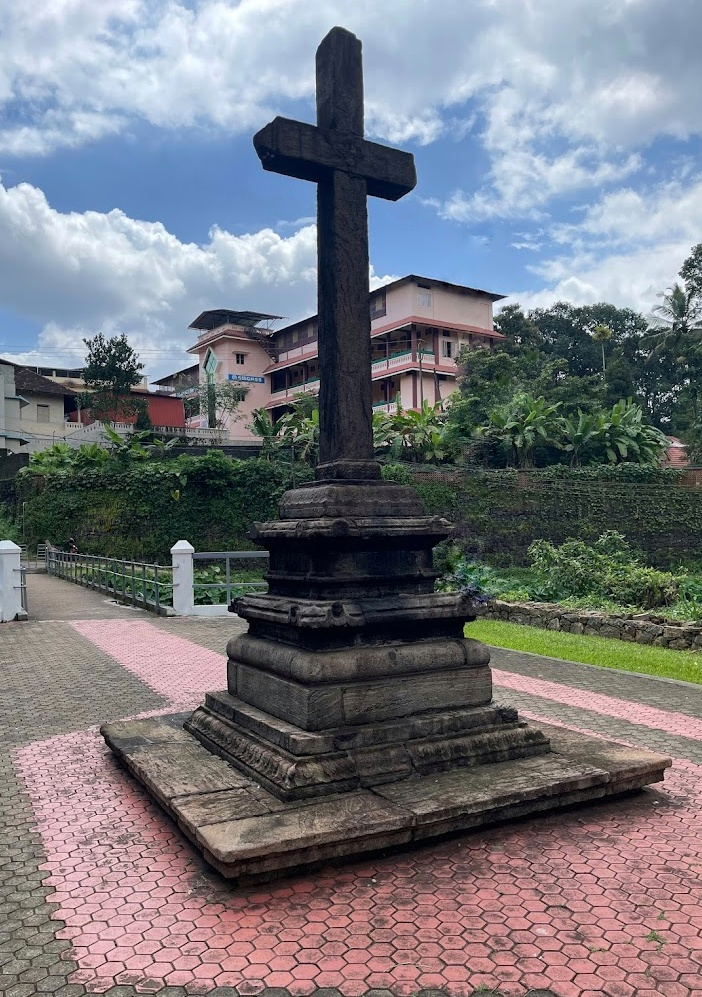
The stone cross of the church

The Kanjirapally Church is recorded in the Jornada as a church in the name of the Holy Mary in the territory ruled by the King of Thekkumkur. The church in Kanjirapally is also mentioned in the works of Joseph Sebastiani, Johannes Facundo Raulin, Anquetil du Perron, and Paulinus. Paulinus describes this church as the Church of the Holy Mary in the mountains, in contact with the people of Madurai.

=== Reemergence of Nilackal tradition ===
==== Structural Remains ====
B. S. Ward and P. E. Conner, while noting the Nilackal tradition of the Nasranis, document that a pagoda in a hollow state is found on an elevated site in Nilackal about 11 miles from Perrunad in 1818. Apparent ruins of a village are found around it. A tank of great depth is present nearby the structure. They add that it is "surrounded by hills and forests infested by elephants and other wild animals, the path to it is circuitous leading over ridges covered with lofty forest".

==== The Quest for Nilackal ====
The 19th century saw a resurgence in the interest surrounding the Chayal-Nilackal tradition. In 1887, Dionysius Joseph I, the head of the Jacobite Syrians, petitioned King Moolam Thirunal of Travancore, to restore the site where the original Nilakkal church is believed to have existed. Though the state Diwan gave the metropolitan assurances, none of these was materialized.

In 1946, the appeal was again made by the Orthodox Syrians to the then Diwan Ramaswami Iyer, who outwardly rejected the appeal and instead sought to build a Shiva temple in the location. In 1957, Syro-Malabar priest Thomas Anthyamkulam discovered what he called the remnants of an ancient church, houses and burial grounds. He built a tree-top hut and started protesting there demanding the construction of a church in the site. Kerala Government’s Forest Department ultimately forced him to vacate the site as it was located within the dense forest and in proximity to the recently erected Nilakkal temple. By the 1970s, the movement gained fresh momentum as various Christian denominations started lobbying the state to allocate the plot of land for the construction of the church. In response, Hindutva organisations led by the VHP started violent protests claiming that the construction of the church would desecrate the Nilackal Temple en route the more prominent Sabarimala hill shrine and that it was a conspiracy to occupy the hill shrine. The government initiated discussions with all the parties involved and approved a different plot for the proposed church, appropriately 3.5 km away from the disputed site.

==== Nilackal Ecumenical Church ====
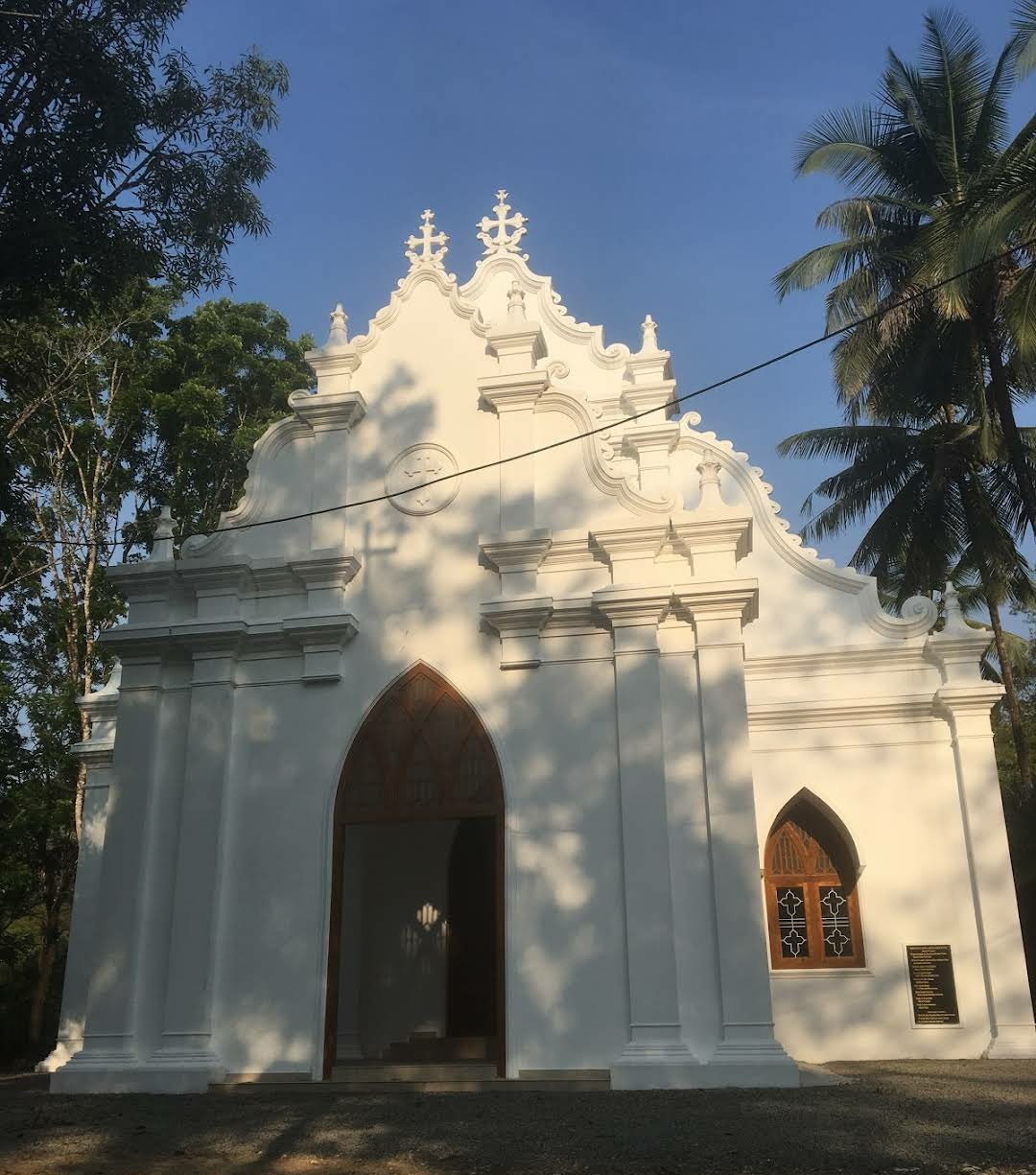
Modern Nilackal Ecumenical Church

The St. Thomas Ecumenical Church at Nilakkal was established as a collaborative effort of the Christian denominations involved in the Nilackal dispute on On 8 April 1984. It is located in Angamoozhi in Nilackal and is administered as an Ecumenical Church under the a board with equal membership of the founding churches, namely the Syro-Malabar, Syro-Malankara Catholic, the Malankara Orthodox, the Malankara Jacobite, Marthomite, and the CSI churches.

== Other churches ==
The churches at Thiruvithamkode, Malayattoor, Mylacombu, and Aruvithura are frequently associated with Saint Thomas tradition and are often referred to as Arappallikal, which may be translated either as 'half churches' or 'royal or noble' churches.

=== Thiruvithamkode ===
Thiruvithamkode St. Marys Orthodox Church (Arapalli) or Thomayar Kovil, is located in Thiruvithamcode, Tamil Nadu, India, 30 km to the south of the Kerala state border.

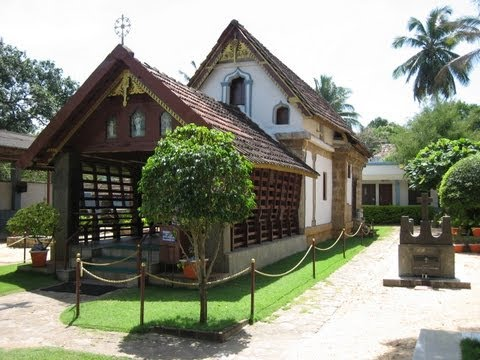

==== Tradition ====
The current tradition is that the Thiruvithamkode Church was founded by Thomas the Apostle around 64 AD. Tradition has it that the king who ruled the region at the time was impressed by the activities and sermons of the Apostle Thomas and converted to Christianity. The king took the initiative to build a church in the area and the church was established accordingly, so the church came to be known as Arappalli or the Royal Church. Thiruvithamkode was the cradle and namesake of the Kingdom of Thiruvithamkoor (Travancore), a fact which may have influenced the origin of this tradition. According to another popular tradition, this name meant the "half-church", because it was smaller than the other seven churches founded by Thomas the Apostle. This may be attributed to its geographical isolation in the far south and ecclesiastical or demographic insignificance compared to other major Christian centers in Malabar. Another tradition attributes its origin to the relocation of 64 Christian families by the apostle himself as they were facing religious persecution in Mylapore.

==== Coromandel Origin ====
While the extant traditions link the foundation of the church to the popular apostolic missions of Saint Thomas, a documented and much older tradition points to the Nasrani exodus from Mylapore and the wider Coromandel region as the origin of the church and the Nasranis of Thiruvithamcode. These earlier traditions of the Thiruvithamkode church attributes its origin to the 64 families of Dariyaykal. This tradition holds that a sorcerer named Manikyavacakar started actively attacking Christians in Mylapore and the Coromandel Coast, both theological and politically sometime before the 9th century. The vast majority of Christians who succumbed to his preaching became the syncretic Manigramamakkar. The Dariyaykal or confessors are those Nasranis who remained steadfast to Christianity. They fled to Malabar due to the persecution and isolation of the Manikyavacakar and his followers. One group went to the Todamala hills and the other group reached Thiruvithamkode. The king settled the people who reached Thiruvithamkode and gave them permission to build a church there. This is said to be the origin of the Thiruvithamkode church in this tradition.

==== History ====
Thiruvithamkode is recorded as the southernmost church and settlement of the Nasranis. The Action VIII Decree VI of the Synod of Diamper records that due to the geographical isolation, there were no priests or other ministers to provide religious instruction to the faithful in the church. It documents that for this reason, the people there turned away from the Christian faith and adopted local beliefs and lived without sacraments such as Baptism. The church building was also in a very poor condition. Therefore, Alexis Menezis decreed, by Synodal act, the rebuilding of the church in Portuguese fashion, the appointment of a vicar, and the supply of the necessary items for the church. The Jornada of Menezis documents that he did not personally visit the church but carried out his instructions through the vicar whom he appointed. By the early 17th century, Thiruvithamkode church thus became one of the earliest of the churches to be rebuilt by the Portuguese as per the prescriptions of the Synod of Diamper.

=== Malayattoor ===
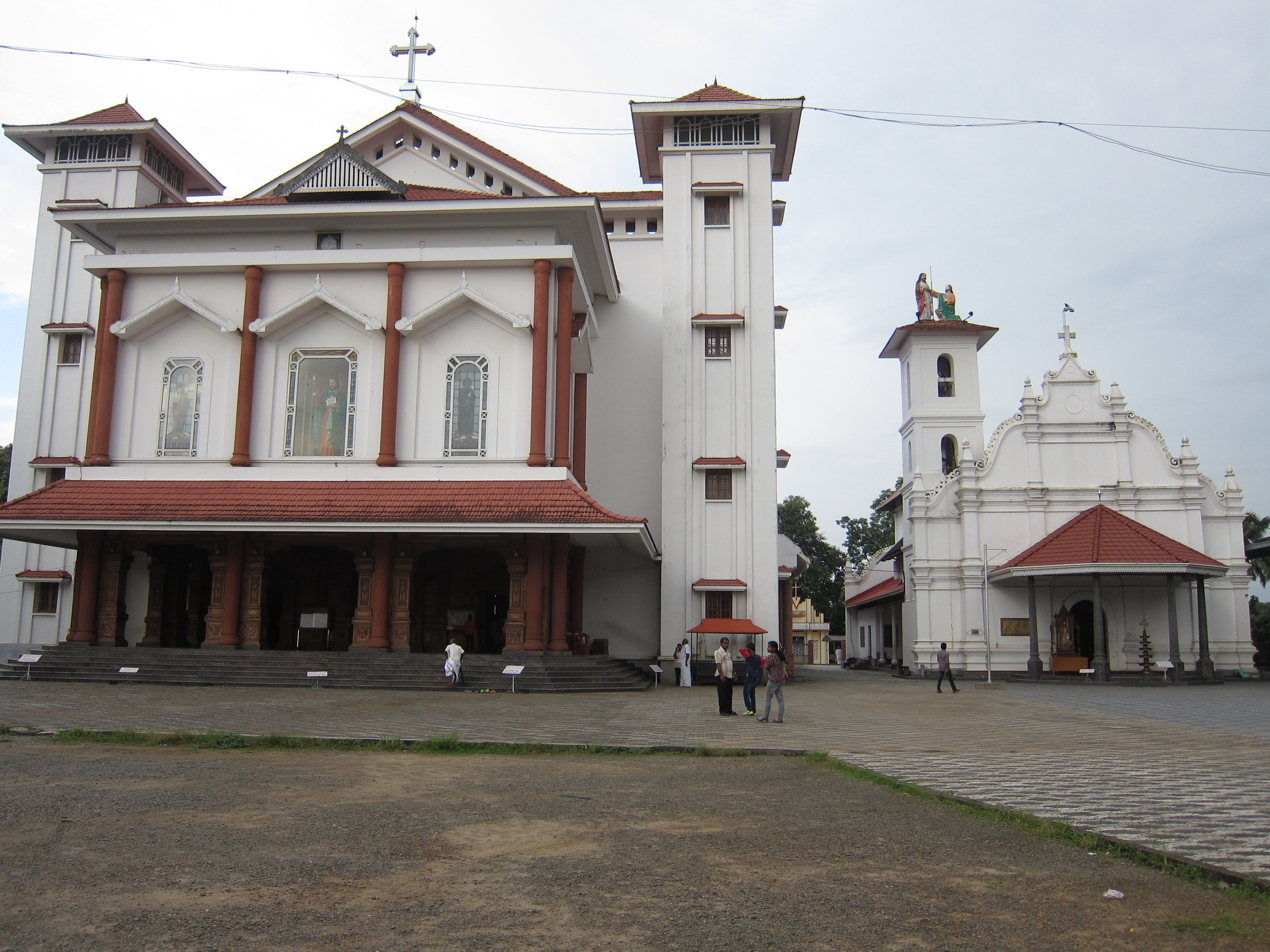
Malayattoor Church

St. Thomas is believed to have returned to Malankara coast via Malayatur where he establishes ‘the half church’ (a small Christian community dependent on the Church of Maliamkara). Oral tradition says that while travelling through Malayattor, faced with hostile natives, he fled to the hilltop where he said to have remained in prayer and that he left his footprint on one of the rocks. According to beliefs, during prayer, he touched a rock, upon which blood poured from it.

=== Mylacombu ===
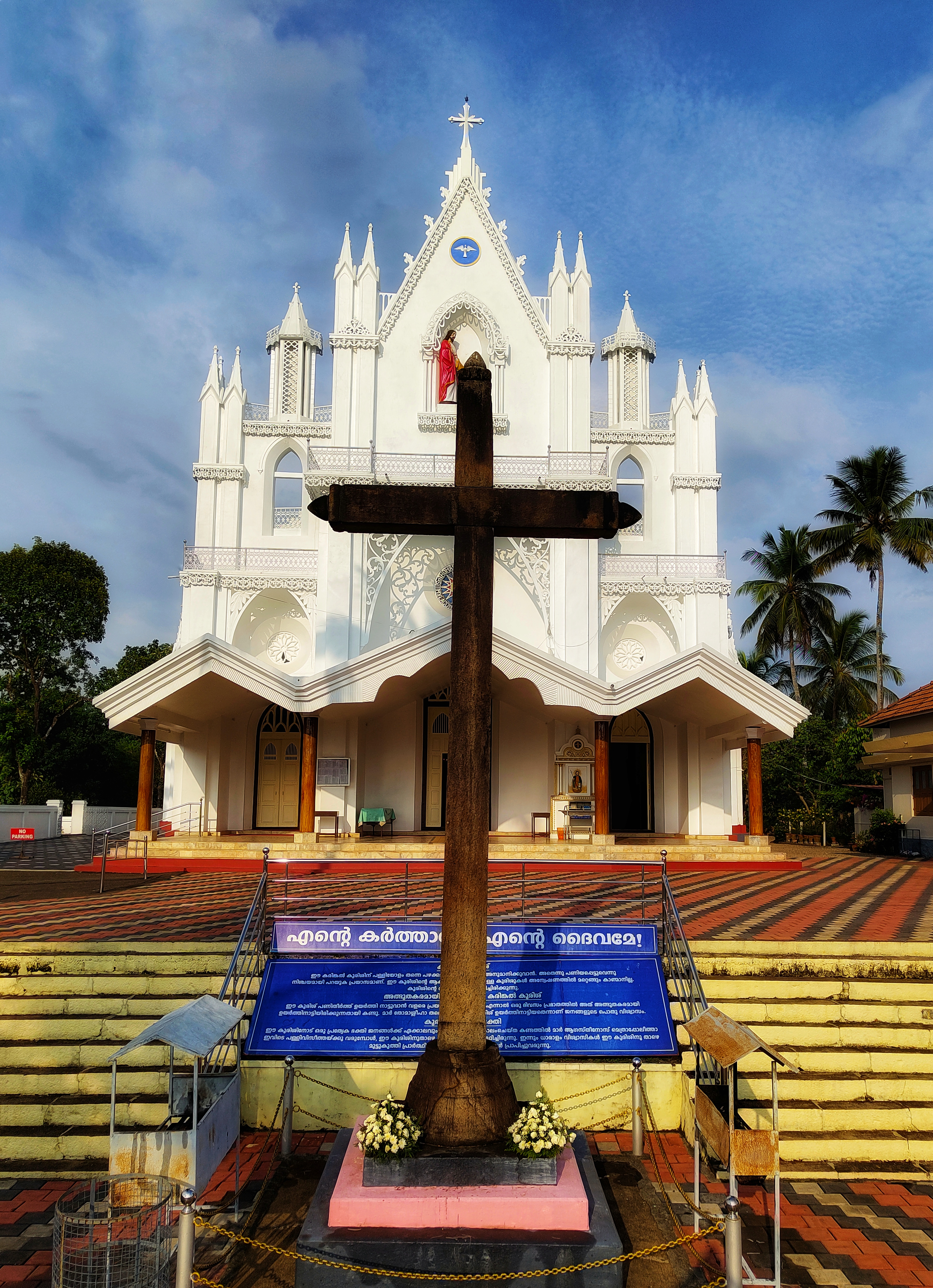
St. Thomas Forane Church Mylacombu

Mylacombu is also considered as one among the arapallikal established by St. Thomas. Mylacombu Church, situated in the Kumaramangalam Grama Panchayath of the Idukki district in Kerala, India, is believed to have been founded by St. Thomas, during his second visit to Kerala after preaching gospel at Mylapore. He then returned back to Mylapore where he was martyred. According to the tradition, during his journey, St. Thomas requested the local king for a place to pray and preach the gospel in the eastern regions. However, the king refused this demand. During that time, Nedumakil Panikalyar, one of the king's generals, was residing at Mylacombu. Upon learning from the locals that Panikalyar could help him, St. Thomas visited Mylacombu and met Panikalyar. During St. Thomas's visit, Panikalyar's daughter was seriously ill, and despite various treatments, her condition did not improve. St. Thomas prayed for the child by laying his hands on her head, and miraculously, she recovered. In gratitude for his daughter's healing, Panikalyar accepted St. Thomas's request and gifted him a place for prayer. Later, disciples of the Apostle constructed a church at the site to serve the growing community of believers who were converted by St. Thomas. Mylacombu church is known as 'The Mother Church of the East' as many ancient churches like Kadamattom, Nakapuzha, Arakuzha, Nediasala, Muthalakodam, Kothamangalam etc were formed from this church.

=== Aruvithura ===
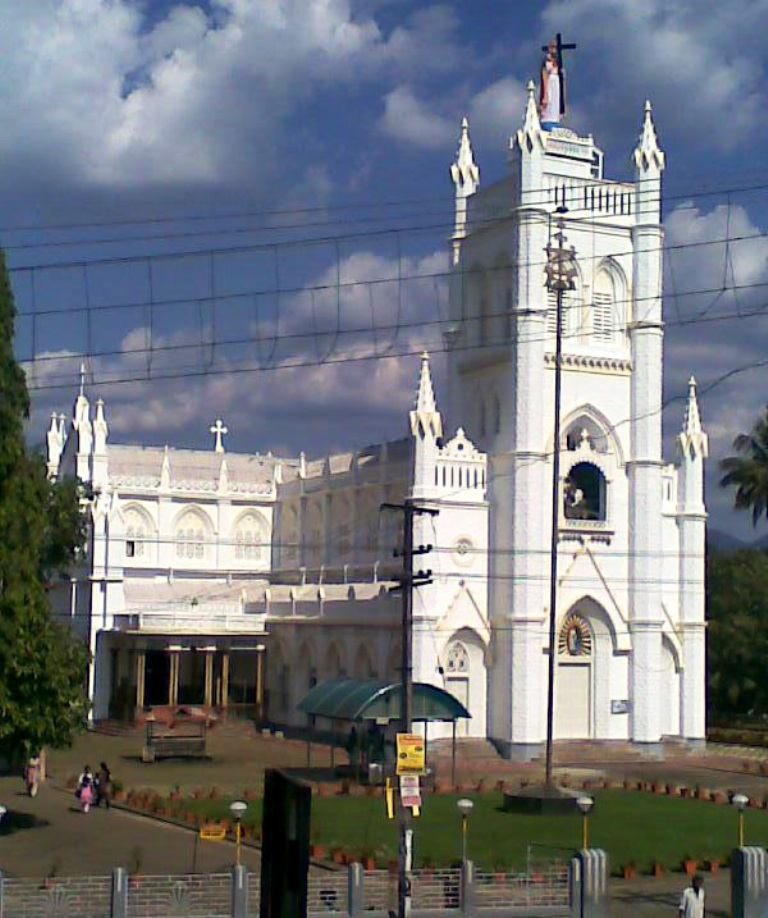
St. George's Church, Aruvithura

It is believed that St. Thomas visited Irapeli and converted a prominent families into Christianity and laid a cross on the banks of the Meenachil River. Local traditions also support this belief. This is the first church in the Palai diocese and was built in the 1st century. St. Thomas founded seven and a half churches there. The 'half' church refers to a cross laid at Irapoli by St. Thomas, making the church of Irapeli the half church. It is reported that the church was rebuilt once or twice before the 16th century. The ancient churches were constructed and maintained by the prominent families in the area until the 16th century. In the beginning of the 16th century a new church was built under the leadership of Kallarackal Kathanar by the prominent families. The church was first dedicated to the Assumption of Saint Mary. In the 14th century when either the Nilackal Church or the Chayal Church founded by St. Thomas was destroyed, several families migrated to Irapeli bringing with them a statue of St. George. Gradually the church itself was re-dedicated to Saint George.
