= Mathan Konatt =

Priest Trustee of the Malankara Jacobite Syrian Church

Malankara Malpan Korah Mathan Konat Chorepiscopa
- Priest Trustee
- Church: Malankara Jacobite Syrian Orthodox Church
- Installed: 1895
- Term ended: 1927
- Predecessor: Thazhath Chacko Chandipillai; Konat Kora Yuhanon (Patriarch faction)
- Opposed to: Palapalli Mani Paulose

Orders
- Ordination: In 1883; Dionysius Joseph II Pulikottil
- Rank: Corepiscopa

Personal details
- Born: Korah Mathan; 30 March 1860 Pampakuda
- Died: 8 November 1927 (aged 67) Pampakuda
- Buried: St. John's Church, Pambakkuda
- Denomination: Syriac Orthodox Christianity
- Parents: Konat Youhanon Malpan (father), Annam (mother)
- Spouse: Eleeshba
- Profession: Writer, teacher, priest
- Education: Vettikkal Mor Behnam Dayara

Kōnāṭṭ Kōrah Māttan (30 March 1860 – 8 November 1927), popularly called Kōnāṭṭ Malpān, was a priest trustee, Malankara Malpan (the Teacher of Malankara) and chorbishop of the Malankara Jacobite Syrian Orthodox Church. He was elected as a priest trustee in 1901 and was one of the main leaders of the Jacobite Church during the 1912 Church Schism. He was a scholar of the Syriac language and wrote several books in it. He played a role in translating the liturgical texts of the Jacobite Church from Syriac into Malayalam. Most West Syriac Rite liturgical texts in Malayalam are based on these translations.

== Birth and childhood ==
Kora Mathan was born into the Konatt family, a priestly family, in Pampakkuta, near Kochi. He was born on March 30, 1860. He was born as the son of Yohannan Malpan, a clerical trustee of the Malankara Jacobite Church and a Syrian scholar. He acquired linguistic and religious training in the Syriac language under his own father, and later studied theology and liturgy in the Syriac language under Parumala Thirumeni (Chathuruthil Geevarghese Gregorios).

== Priesthood and literary contributions ==
He was ordained as a priest in 1883 by the Malankara Metropolitan Dionysius V of Pulikottil and later became a teacher at the Kottayam Old Seminary. On the advice of the Malankara Metropolitan, he established a minor seminary in his homeland, in Pampakkuda, to train young priests. He also established a printing press called Mor Julius Press adjacent to the seminary. He was enthusiastic about translating the prayer services of the West Syriac Jacobite Rite from the original language, West Syriac, into Malayalam. There, he translated the Jacobite breviary into Malayalam, which became popular under the name 'Pampakkuta Namaskaram'. On the account of his service for the translation of liturgy and church literature, Patriarch Ignatius Peter III, the supreme head of the Jacobite Church, honoured him with the title, Malankara Malpan. Mathan was the first to be bestowed this prestigious ecclesiastical title.

The breviary was first published in 1910 with the approval of Patriarch Ignatius Abdullah II. In addition to this, Konatt anslated many other Syriac books into Malayalam. These include Dionysius Barsalibi's commentary on the Gospel of Saint Matthew, Bar Hebrew's Ecclesiastical Canon and the New Testament, excluding the Book of Revelation. Besides these, he also published the Shehimo (breviary for the ferial days), a number of anaphorae, liturgical texts for the Great Week, order of deaconate ordination and texts of the orders for Baptism, marriage and funerals. A collection of letters he wrote to Syria, in his beautiful West Syriac 'Serto' handwriting, is preserved there. In addition, there are letters he wrote to various churches and individuals in the country, as well as a brief history of the Malankara Jacobite Church from an apologetic perspective.

== Priest Trustee (1901-27) ==
In 1901, Konatt Mathan was elected as the clerical trustee of the Malankara Jacobite Church. The Mulanthuruthi Synod, convened in 1876 under the leadership of Patriarch Peter IV, had established a three-member board of trustees consisting of the Metropolitan, the Priest, and the Lay Trustees for the administration of the church. This system was introduced to prevent the concentration of power in the Malankara Metropolitan. Parumala Thirumeni, the mentor of Konatt Mathan, first recommended him for the position of priest-trustee of the church. He took office during the term of Dionysius V Pulikottil and worked with him for eight years. Following the death of Dionysius Pulikottil, Dionysius VI Vattasseril was elected as the Malankara Metropolitan in 1909 and was subsequently consecrated by Patriarch Ignatius Abdullah II.

Konatt Mathan and C. J. Kurien continued as the co-bearers of the new Malankara Metropolitan, holding the positions of Priest trustee and Lay trustee respectively. But before a year had passed, disputes began over church governance. Konatt and the Lay Trustee had differences of opinion with the Vattasseril on various issues. The dispute was led by the Metropolitan Trustee's unilateral decision-making, ignoring the fellow trustees. Complaints against Dionysius Vattasseril reached Patriarch Abdullah II. A difference of opinion had already developed between the Patriarch and Vattasseril regarding the administrative authority in the church. The reason for this was Dionysius's unwillingness to send the documents of declaration of allegiance required by the Patriarch. By 1911, internal dissensions had caused a major split in the church. The Patriarch suspended Dionysius Vattasseril and convened the Malankara Association to elect a new Malankara Metropolitan. The Patriarch appointed Kourilos Paulus Kochuparampil, who was consecrated as bishop along with Vattasseril, as the new Malankara Metropolitan. These steps of the Patriarch were taken with the full support of Konatt Mathan and C. J. Kurien.

Vattasseril was not ready to accept these actions of the Patriarch. Vattasseril invited Ignatius Abdulmasih II, the deposed Jacobite Patriarch. Vattasseril requested the establishment of the Catholicate (Maphrianate) of the East in India and the elevation of one of the senior bishops, Murimattattil Paulos Ivanios, to the position. In the absence of Vattasseril, Abdulmasih II performed the enthronement of the new catholicos at Niranam. Vattasseril thereby obtained the support of Murimattattil, who was elevated as the first Catholicos under the name Baselios Paulos I, and bishop Alvaris Julius, a Goan Latin Catholic convert to Syriac Orthodoxy.

The mental stress faced by Konatt Mathan during the schism was severe. He did not succumb to any kind of pressure or temptation. He was reportedly slapped in his face by Dionysius Vattasseril at the old seminary in Kottayam. The Metropolitan faction (Orthodox Church) led by Dionysius Vattasseril declared Mathan and C. J. Kurien deposed from their posts. However, the Bawa faction (Jacobite Church) rejected this removal. K. C. Mammen, one of the leading figures in the Orthodox faction, says: "The main reason why those north of Kottayam joined the Bava faction was the extraordinary personality, greatness and influence of Father Konattu Malpan."

== Death ==
Konatt Mathan served as a priest trustee in the Malankara Jacobite Church until his death. In 1926, Konatt was honored by the Church with the rank of 'Korepiscopa', the highest rank in the West Syriac Jacobite Church granted to a married priest. Konatt Kora Mathan passed away on November 8, 1927, at the age of 68. He was buried in the church located on his family property in Pampakkuta. The funeral services were led by the then Malankara Metropolitan of the Church, Athanasios Paulose, and the Patriarchal delegate, Eustathios Slība.
