= Kokkamangalam =

- village
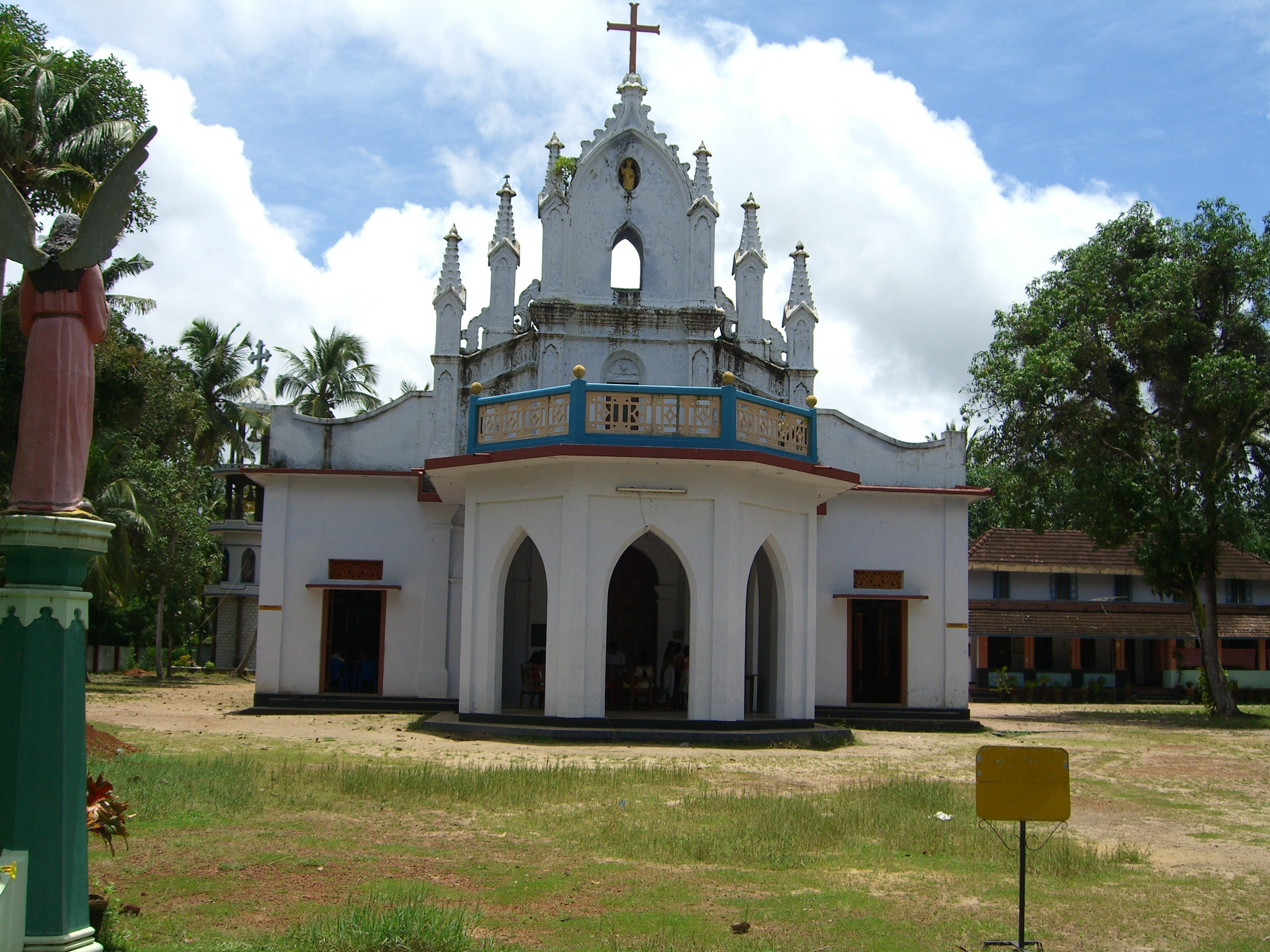
- Kokkamangalam church
- Interactive map of Kokkamangalam
- Coordinates: 9°40′47″N 76°22′26″E
- Country: India
- State: Kerala
- District: Alappuzha

Languages
  - Official: Malayalam, English
- Time zone: UTC+5:30 (IST)
- PIN: 685527
- Vehicle registration: KL-32

Kokkamangalam also known as Gokkamangalam is a village in Alappuzha district of Kerala state, south India. It is situated in between Cochin and Kumarakom and on the western shore of Vembanad Lake, 5 km east of the town of Cherthala, which has the nearest railway station.

== History ==
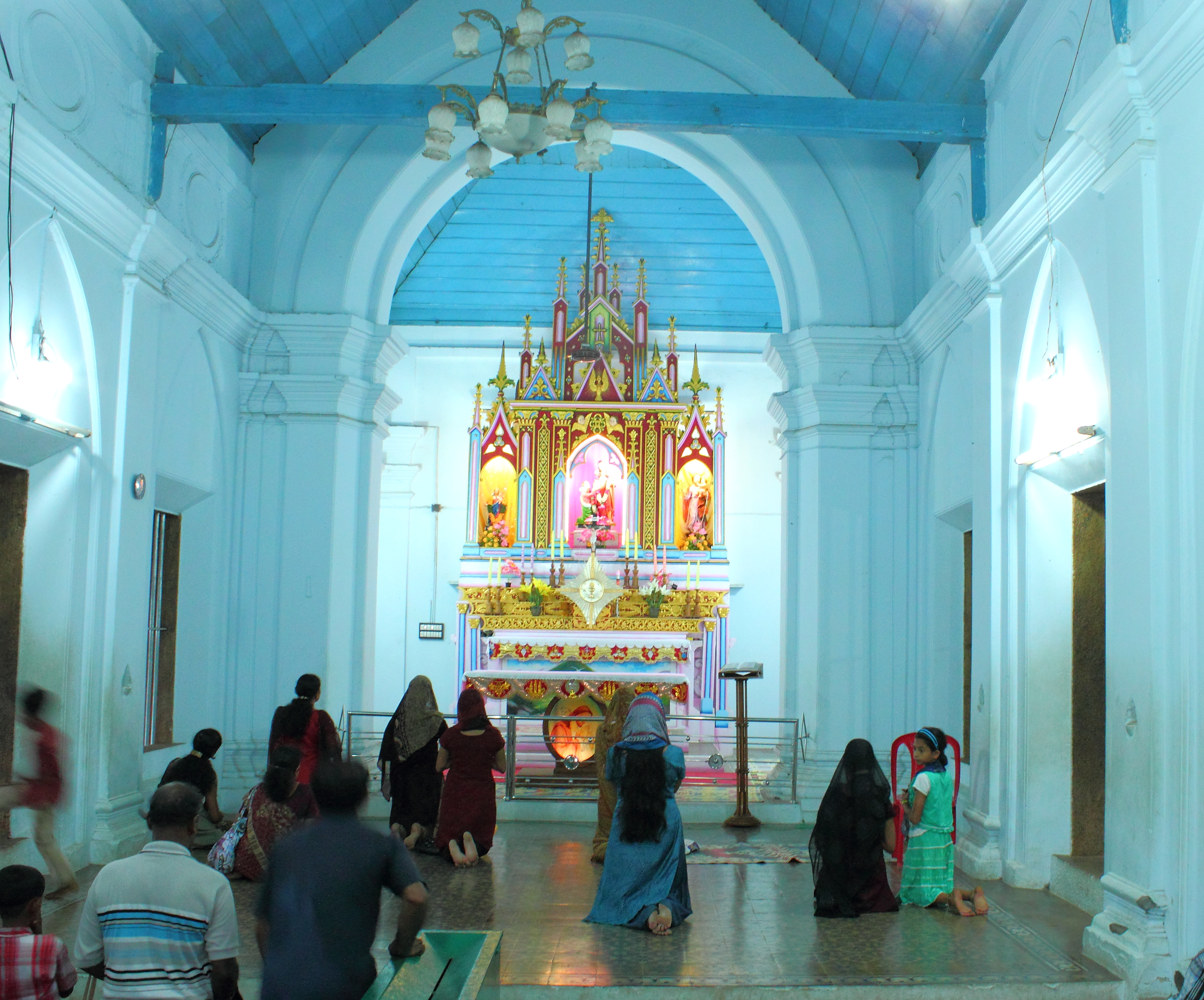
Kurishumudi church

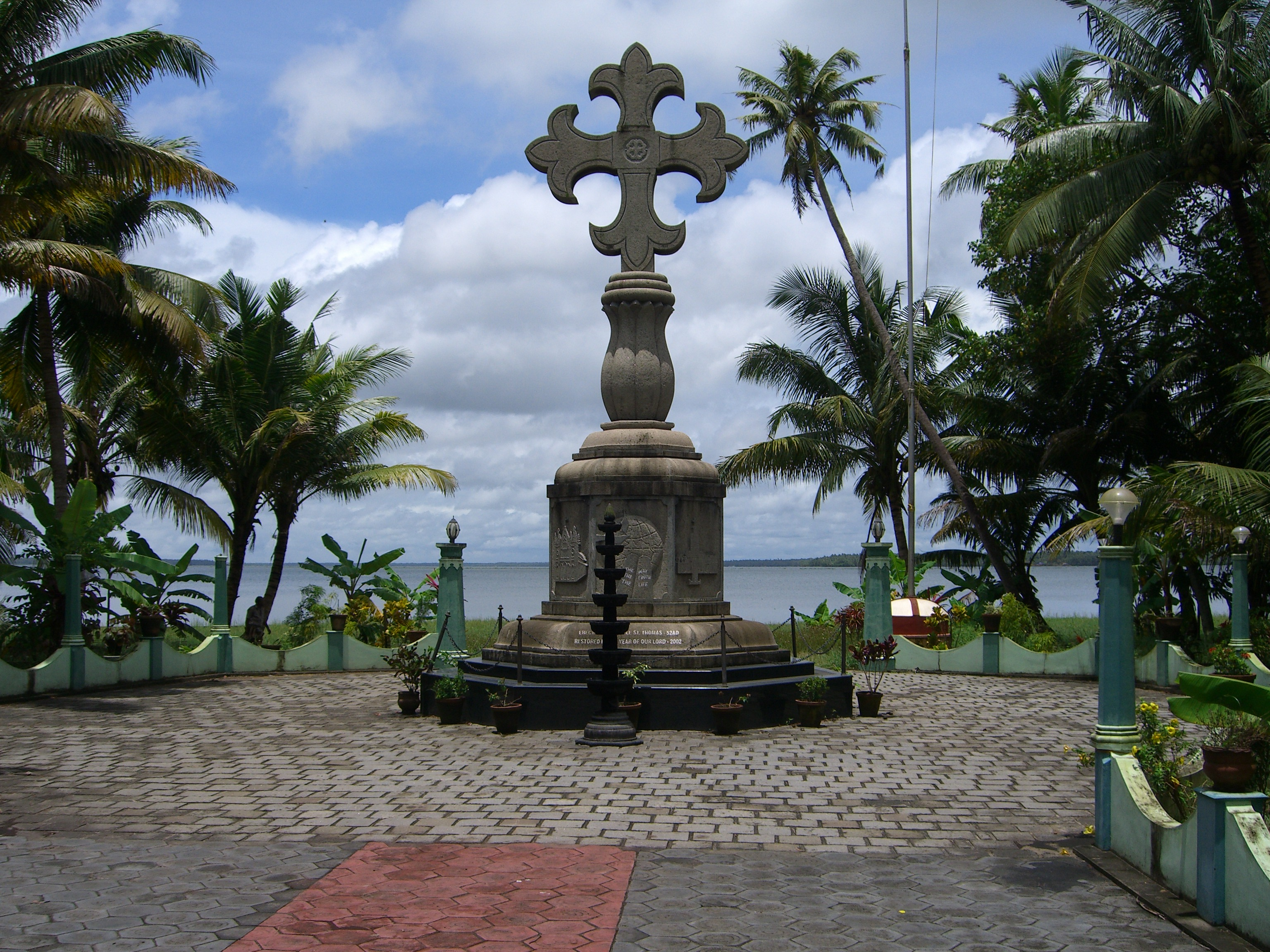
St.Thomas Cross

A church was erected near the village temple. The present church was rebuilt in 1900 on the same site. Local attractions include picnic boating at Kokkamangalam. The long view of "Vembanad Lakeexpans" with green margin of coconut palms is also considered a must see. Kokkamangalam village itself is a place of traditional coconut processing cottage industry and numerous small coir spinning units. Thanneermukkom saltwater barrier, Pathiramanal Island, Kumarakom bird sanctuary are among the places of interest nearby. The Cochin International Airport is 70 kilometers from Kokkamangalam.
