= Schism of 1912 =

Ongoing church dispute in India

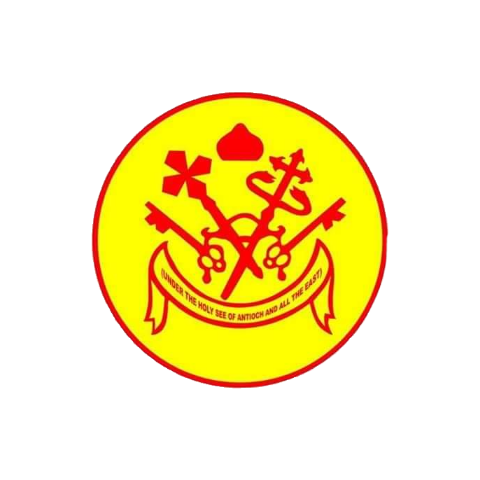
Emblem of Syriac Orthodox Patriarchate of Antioch and All the East

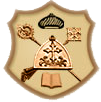
Emblem of Malankara Orthodox Syrian Church
Emblems of both Churches (Syriac Orthodox Patriarchate / Malankara Jacobite Syrian Church, Malankara Orthodox Syrian Church)
- Date: 1912 – 1958 and 1976 - present
- Also known as: Orthodox-Jacobite schism; Second Vaṭṭippaṇa Case; Second Community Litigation
- Type: Christian schism
- Cause: 1. Power struggle between the three trustees of the church, namely, Malankara Metropolitan Dionysius Vattasseril on one side and Korah Mathen Konatt and C. J. Kurian on the other 2. Decision of Dionysius VI Vattasseril to: remove Korah Mathen Konatt as Priest trustee and C. J. Kurian as the lay trustee of the Malankara Church; 3. Decision of Patriarch Ignatius Abded Aloho II to: suspend Dionysius Vattasseril as Malankara Metropolitan and appoint Paulose Koorilos Kochuparambil as Malankara Metropolitan; 4. Decision of Ignatius Abded Mshiho II to: Revive and relocate the autocephalous Catholicate of the East to India, elevate Paulose Ivanios Murimattathil as the Catholicos (Maphrian) for the Malankara Church, and entrust the patriarchal rights to the Catholicos
- Participants: Primary: Syriac Orthodox Patriarchate of Antioch and All the East; Malankara Orthodox Syrian Church.; Secondary: Dionysius Vattasseril, Korah Mathen Konatt, C. J. Kurian; Koorilos Kochuparambil, Malankara Jacobite Syrian Orthodox Church; Ignatius Abded Aloho II, Ignatius Abded Mshiho II; Baselios Paulose I, P. T. Geevarghese.
- Outcome: The excommunication of Dionysius Vattasseril by Syriac Orthodox Patriarch Ignatius Abded Aloho II.; Creation of the autocephalous Catholicate of the East in India by Ignatius Abded Mshiho II.; Schism in the Malankara Church and formation of Patriarchal "Bawa Party" and Anti-patriarchal "Metran Party"; Independence of the Malankara Orthodox Syrian Church; Severing of submission to Ignatius Abded Aloho II, by the Malankara Orthodox Syrian Church.

The Malankara Orthodox-Jacobite church dispute or the Schism of 1912 was the split in the Malankara Syrian Church that led to an ongoing series of church disputes in Kerala, India. The dispute, also known as the Second Community Case or the Second Vaṭṭippaṇa Case (Malayalam: രണ്ടാം സമുദായക്കേസ്, രണ്ടാം വട്ടിപ്പണക്കേസ്), has been intertwined with continuous litigations and has resulted in the formation of two rival church bodies, namely the autocephalous Malankara Orthodox Syrian Church, and the Malankara Jacobite Syrian Church, an autonomous church under the Syriac Orthodox patriarchate of Antioch. Although the Indian supreme court judgement of 1995 made a terminal legal conclusion of the dispute, the disagreements related to the administration of the parish church property continues to cause occasional law and order problems and significant obstruction to a permanent solution of the dispute. The dispute in three of these parishes was moved to the court and its final verdict was made by the Supreme Court in 2017, in favour of the Malankara Orthodox Church.

The dispute remains unresolved, and police interventions to implement the judgement continue to meet intense protest and confrontation in churches currently administered by the Jacobite Church. The continuing dispute also led to increased sectarianism among members of the once undivided community and the solidification of the schism between the two rival factions.

Presently, according to data from the Indian government, the Malankara Orthodox Syrian Church is significantly larger than the Jacobite Syrian Christian Church adding another layer of complexity to the schism. Further issues have been caused by the churches geographic concentrations with the Jacobite faction dominant throughout the Ernakulam district, leading to scenarios of split-parishes with large parish disparities like Marthoman Cheriapally in Kothamangalam which has 3,000 Jacobite families to 8 of the Malankara Orthodox faction.

== First schism ==
In 1908, Dionysius Vattasseril, who was elected as the Malankara Metropolitan in 1909 by the Malankara Jacobite Syrian Christian Association, travelled to Mardin to be consecrated as a bishop by Ignatius Abded Aloho II, the Syriac Orthodox Patriarch of Antioch. He was accompanied by another bishop-elect, Monk Paulose Kochuparambil. The patriarch consecrated Vattasseril with the episcopal name as Dionysios Giwargis (commonly addressed as H. G. Geevarghese Mar Dionysius), and Kochuparambil as Kurillos Paulose at the recently acquired Saint Mark's Monastery in Jerusalem. This was a period of intense tribulations for the Syriac Orthodox Church in the Syrian heartland. The members of the church were being subjected to an ethnic genocide and the leadership of the church was divided between Ignatius Abded Aloho II and Ignatius Abdal Masih II, his deposed predecessor. Abded Aloho II had the official recognition from the Ottoman Sultan but Abdal Masih II continued to enjoy significant support in Mardin, the traditional bastion of the church.

Upon arriving in the country and assuming power, Dionysios soon came into conflict with his co-trustees, Kora Mathan Malpan and C. J. Kurien. According to the decision of the Mulanthuruthi Synod of 1876, the church properties such as Vattipanam and the Syrian Seminary of Kottayam were to be administered collectively by three elected trustees, which included the Malankara Metropolitan or Metropolitan Trustee, and his co-trustees, namely the Priest trustee and the Lay trustee. The co-trustees complained with the Patriarch protesting Dionysius' arbitrary decisions and disregard for them. According to the Travancore Royal Court judgement of 1889, the Patriarch's authority was limited spiritual authority over the Malankara Church. Dionysius, who assessed that the Patriarch was attempting to take action against him with the support of his opponents, refused to sign the instrument of submission asked by the Patriarch. Following this, the Patriarch suspended Dionysios and declared him deposed, replacing him with Kochuparambil Kurilos as the Malankara Metropolitan. This resulted in a schism in the Malankara Church. In the dispute, those who supported Patriarch "Bava" were called the "Bava party" and those who supported "Metran" Dionysius Vattasseril were called the "Metran party". Among these, the Bava faction was the ancestral body which eventually evolved into the Malankara Jacobite Syrian Orthodox Church and the Methran faction evolved into the Malankara Orthodox Syrian Church.

== Brief Reunion of 1958 ==
Since 1958, there has been a mutual acceptance between the two factions in the church, and as part of that, the Bava faction and the Methran faction merged. The Methran faction recognized the Syrian Orthodox Patriarch of Antioch as the spiritual supreme leader, and in return, the Bava faction accepted the Catholicos Baselios Geevarghese II as the head of the united Malankara Church. After the death of Geevarghese II in 1964, the then Patriarch Ignatius Jacob III arrived in Kerala and presided over the Synod of the Church to elect a new Catholicos. Metropolitan Timothios Augen of the Kandanad Diocese was elected Catholicos at the Synod. Initially a bishop of the Patriarchal faction, Augen had later joined the Metropolitan faction. The new Catholicos' ordination took place under the patronage of the Patriarch. At the ceremony, he confessed his allegiance to the Patriarch and assumed the title of Catholicos under the name Baselios Augen I. Although these developments gave hope for unity in the church among the general public and lay faithful, divisive movements remained active behind the scenes. Soon, Augen I and his supporters came into conflict with the Patriarch. Patriarch Yakub's unilateral attempts to intervene in the church also exacerbated the sectarianism.

== The Second Split ==
In 1975, the dispute escalated again and the Patriarch suspended the Catholicos. The obvious reasons for this were issues such as the dispute of power between the Patriarch and the Catholicos, and the Catholicos' claim to the throne of Saint Thomas and the claim of autocephaly for the Malankara Syrian Church. The patriarch's supporters elected a new Catholicos to replace the then-current Catholicos, Augen I. The Patriarch appointed Metropolitan Philexinos Paulos of the Diocese of Kandanad to this position.

At the same time, Augen I and his supporters declared that the actions of the Patriarch were unacceptable and he remained the Catholicos for the Orthodox faction. Thus, another split occurred in the church, and at the same time, two Catholicos lineages emerged forming the present day Malankara Orthodox Syrian Church (Orthodox faction) and Malankara Jacobite Syrian Orthodox Church (Jacobite faction).

== Recent Developments (2017–2026) ==
Following the 2017 Supreme Court verdict in K.S. Varghese v. St. Peter’s and Paul’s Syrian Orthodox Church, which affirmed the 1934 Constitution for all Malankara parish churches, the dispute entered a complex phase of legal enforcement.

=== High Court Division Bench Ruling (2026) ===
On 24 March 2026, a Division Bench of the Kerala High Court (comprising Justice Anil K. Narendran and Justice Muralee Krishna S.) delivered a landmark judgment regarding the takeover of disputed churches. The bench set aside previous Single Judge orders that had directed district collectors to physically take possession of six disputed churches (including those in Ernakulam and Palakkad).

The Court clarified that while it is a "constitutional duty" to ensure religious services are conducted according to the 1934 Constitution, the High Court cannot direct the civil administration to assume physical control of religious properties under Article 226. Instead, such "possession battles" must be resolved through established civil suits, though the police must provide protection to the legally recognized vicars to prevent law and order issues.

=== Humanitarian and Legislative Measures ===
- Burial Act (2020): To address the humanitarian crisis of denied funerals, the Kerala Government passed the Kerala Right to Burial of Corpse in Christian (Malankara Orthodox-Jacobite) Cemeteries Act. This law ensures that members of both factions can be buried in their ancestral cemeteries regardless of administrative control.
- Mediation Efforts (2026): In February 2026, Prime Minister Narendra Modi met with leaders of both factions in New Delhi, expressing a desire to resolve the century-long dispute through mutual discussion while maintaining the unity of the Malankara Church.
