= Gregorios of Parumala =

Indian Orthodox Saint

Saint Geevarghese Mar Gregorios of Parumala
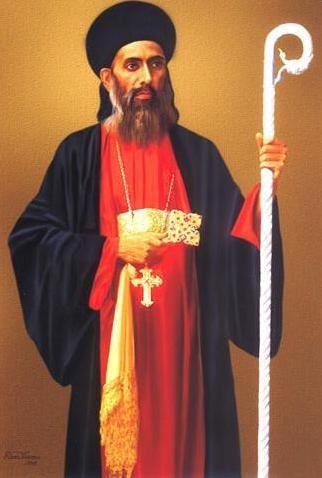

Metropolitan of Niranam, Thumpamon, and Kollam
- Born: Geevarghese; 15 June 1848; Mulanthuruthy, Kerala, India
- Died: 2 November 1902 (aged 54); Parumala, Kerala, India
- Venerated in: Malankara Orthodox Syrian Church; Syriac Orthodox Church; Oriental Orthodox Churches
- Canonized: 2 November 1947 by Baselios Geevarghese II of Malankara Orthodox Syrian Church; 20 October 1987 by Ignatius Zakka I of Syriac Orthodox Church
- Major shrine: Saint Peter's and Saint Paul's Orthodox Syrian Church, Parumala
- Feast: 2 November
- Patronage: Parumala

Geevarghese Mar Gregorios of Parumala (15 June 1848 – 2 November 1902), also known as Parumala Thirumeni, was a prelate who served as the Metropolitan of Niranam, Thumpamon and Kollam in the Malankara Church.

Parumala Thirumeni became the first person of Indian origin to be canonised as saint. On 2 November 1947, Catholicos Baselios Geevarghese II of the Malankara Orthodox Syrian Church declared Mar Gregorios as a saint. On 20 October 1987, Patriarch Ignatius Zakka I, the Syriac Orthodox Patriarch of Antioch and All the East, canonized Mar Gregorios in order to be recited in the diptychs for all parishes of the Malankara Syriac Orthodox Church around the world.

== Early life ==
Geevarghese was born in the Pallathitta family of Chathuruthil house at Mulanthuruthy near Cochin, India on 15 June 1848. His parents were Mathai Geevarghese and Mariam Geevarghese. He was called by the name ‘Kochaippora’ and was given the baptismal name ‘Geevarghese’. Geevarghese had two brothers and two sisters; Kurian, Eli, Mariam and Varkey. Geevarghese was the youngest. Geevarghese's mother died when he was a small boy and since then he was under the loving care of his elder sister Mariam.

At a very young age, Geevarghese had shown interest in spiritual matters. His devotion, humility and above all, his ability to sing the traditional Syriac hymns beautifully and perfectly, came to the notice of his uncle Geevarghese Malpan. The uncle wanted to raise his nephew to be a priest and his family members, who knew Geevarghese's character, agreed to the Malpan's request.

== Priesthood ==
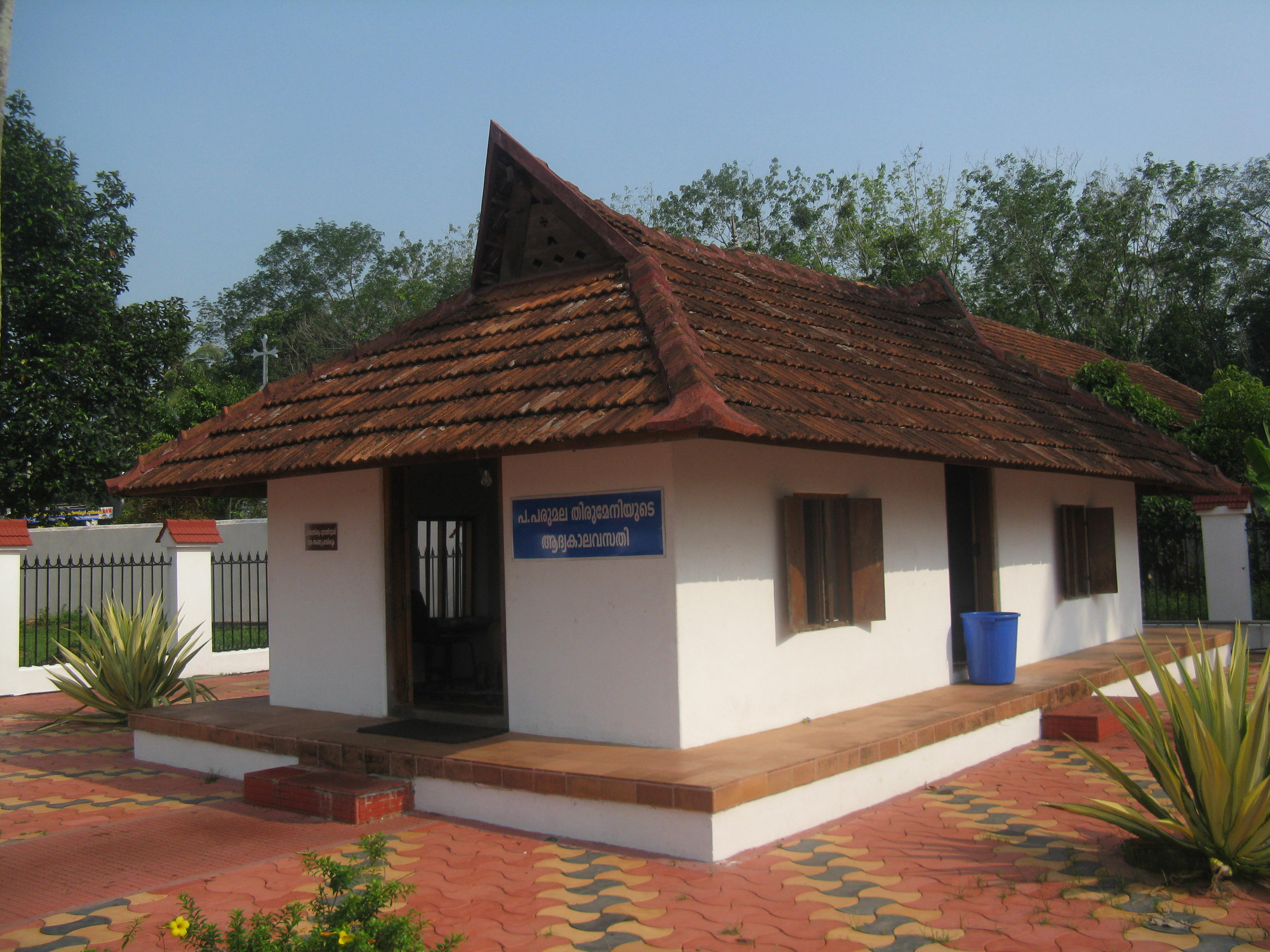
Azhippura - Small building where Mar Gregorios stayed in Parumala. He used the same place for training deacons

Geevarghese was taught by his uncle Geevarghese Malpan and was ordained a qoruyo (sub-deacon) on the Feast of the Cross (Kanni 14, M.E.1033 / 26 September 1857) at the age of ten by Malankara Metropolitan Mathews Mar Athanasius at St. George Syrian Cathedral, Karingachira.

He continued his training with Malpan until the latter died from smallpox. Gheevarghese was also infected with smallpox but survived. He was ordained as a mshamshono (deacon) by Yuyakim Mor Koorilos Reesh-Episcopa of Malankara (patriarchal delegate of Malankara) then after one month Priest at the age of 18 in 1865 also chorbishop (monk-archpriest) again by Yuyakim Mor Koorilos and as a ramban (monk-priest) at the age of 22 by Malankara Metropolitan Joseph Mar Dionysios in 1872.

On 10 December 1876, Ignatius Peter IV, Patriarch of Antioch, consecrated the 28-year old Gheevarghese to be a Metropolitan at St. Thomas Jacobite Syrian Church, Vadakkan Paravoor, at which point his official name became Geevarghese Mar Gregorios. He was the youngest of who all were elevated as bishops and was called Kochu Thirumeni (Young Bishop). Gregorios was given the charge of Niranam Diocese.

== Metropolitan ==
In his bishopric, in the Niranam Diocese, Mar Gregorios established various churches and was the motivator to establish schools in different parts of Malankara. In the late 1890s, many educational institutions were started by the Malankara Church under the initiative and guidance of him and Joseph Mar Dionysius. Examples of these include St. Thomas School at Mulanthuruthy, St. Ignatius School at Kunnamkulam, and the Syrian English School (now known as MGM High School) at Thiruvalla.

Following the death of fellow metropolitans (bishops), the administration of Thumpamon and Kollam dioceses was also passed down to him. In 1887, the first block of the Parumala Seminary was consecrated.

By 1895, Mar Gregorios had made Parumala his main spiritual centre. The church that he founded there in that year was consecrated to Saint Peter and Saint Paul. He would wake at 4 am to pray the Shehimo prayers and he fasted on Wednesday and Fridays, as well as during Lent.

Mar Gregorios visited Jerusalem in 1895. He visited almost all the important places of Christendom and led the Passion Week services at Syrian Orthodox Church in the Holy City with accompanied members Geevarghese Mar Dionysius of Vattasseril, Kochuparambil Paulose Mar Koorilos and Sleeba Mor Osthathios of Arthat (Later Patriarchal Delegate of Malankara) led as guide. On his return, he collected a certain amount from all the Parishes in Malankara and sent a Silver Cross as offering to the Holy church in Jerusalem.

== Spiritual interventions ==
In the 1890s, Mar Gregorios of Parumala visited Mazhuvannoor near Kolenchery and stayed there for a period of time. Local traditions link his visit to events such as efforts to protect the paddy fields of Njeriyamkuzhi Paadam from pest infestations and a prophecy concerning the Periyar River, which later became a key source of irrigation for the region through the Periyar Valley High Level Canal Project, even though the Muvattupuzha River is geographically closer. According to these accounts, he prayed that the river’s flow would reach the area and that the land would yield “a hundred, sixty, and thirtyfold harvest.”

== Disciples ==
Among the many disciples of Mar Gregorios, five deserve special notice

1. Sleeba of Amid (later Sleeba Mor Osthathios, Syriac Orthodox Patriarchal Delegate of India)
2. Vattasseril Geevarghese (later, Malankara Metropolitan Geevarghese Mar Dionysius of Vattasseril) (served as the Private Secretary of Mar Gregorios)
3. Pampady Paulose (later, Paulose Mar Coorilose ).
4. Kuttikattu Paulose (later, Paulose Mar Athanasios)
5. Kallasseril Geevarghese (later, Catholicos of Malankara Church and Malankara Metropolitan Baselios Geevarghese II)
6. Rev Fr. V.I.Zachariah of Vadakkethalackal Mahakudumbam, Mavelikkara, the priest who involved himself in rebuilding Sabarimala Temple after the fire and on the death of his father in law, Kochummen Muthalali of Polachirackal family who had contracted and funded the construction.

== Death ==
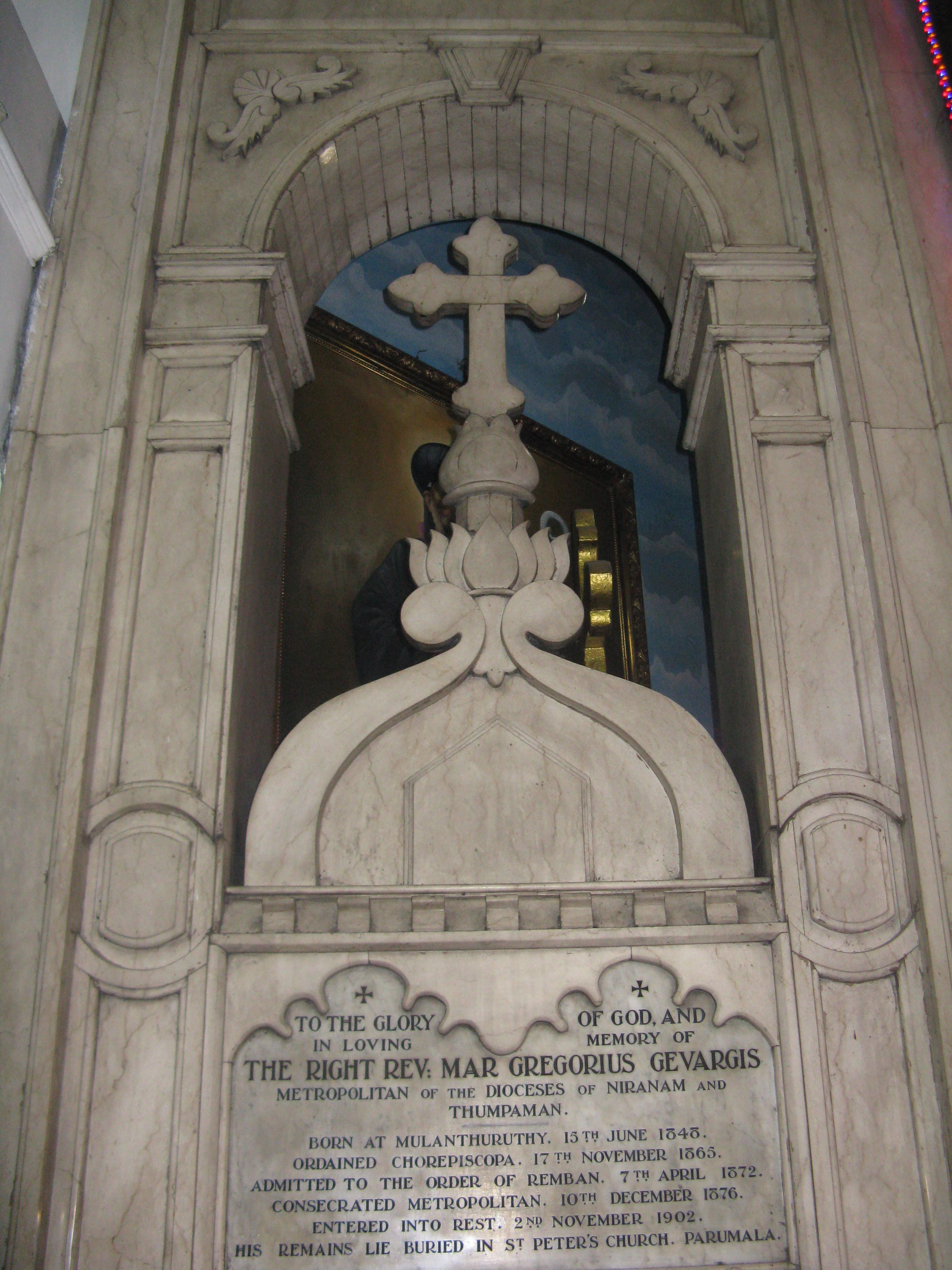
Tomb of Gregorios at St. Peter and St. Paul Orthodox Syrian Church, Parumala

Mar Gregorios had been subjected to a stomach ulcer and it became chronic in 1902. Treatment proved futile and he grew weaker and weaker. On 2 November 1902, Thirumeni left for his heavenly abode. The funeral was conducted at Saint Peter's and Saint Paul's Orthodox Church, Parumala, on 3 November 1902. Thousands of people and hundreds of priests were present at the funeral who gave testimony of the saintly Gregorios. The mausoleum which Gregorios was interred in, has become a popular pilgrimage site.

== Canonization ==
=== Malankara Orthodox Syrian Church ===
On the occasion of 45th death anniversary of Geevarghese Mar Gregorios, based on the decision of the episcopal synod held in 1947, Baselios Geevarghese II, Catholicos of the East and Malankara Metropolitan, declared Mar Gregorios as a saint for the Malankara Orthodox Syrian Church on 2 November 1947.

=== Syriac Orthodox Church ===
According to the recommendation of the local synod of Church in India, held on 22 August 1987 Ignatius Zakka I, Patriarch of Antioch, head of Syriac Orthodox Church declared Mar Gregorios as canonized saint for Jacobite Syrian Christian Church on 20 October 1987.

== Major Shrines ==
- St. Peter and St. Paul's Church, Parumala - It is a major pilgrimage site for all Christians in Kerala. The tomb of the late bishop is located in this church, administered by the Malankara Orthodox Syrian Church.
- St. Thomas Orthodox Cathedral, Mulanthuruthy - One of the major shrines of Parumala Mar Gregorios, known as the church where he was baptized.
