= Anthrayos of Kallada =

Syriac Orthodox Metropolitan (d. 1692)

Metropolitan Mor Anthrayos
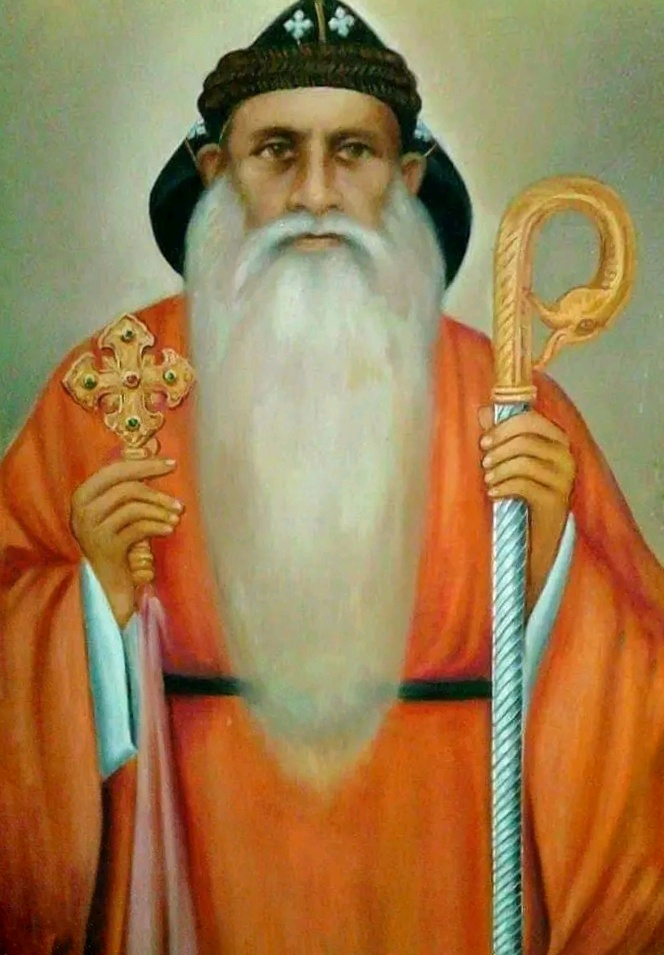
- Portrait of Mor Anthrayos

Mor Anthrayos of Kallada
- Died: 2 March, 1692; Kallada
- Major shrine: St. Mary's Orthodox Syrian Church, Kallada
- Patronage: Jacobite Syrian Orthodox Church; Malankara Orthodox Church

Mor Anthrayos was a Syriac Orthodox Metropolitan of Jerusalem. He arrived in Kerala in 1678 CE with three brothers. Together, they stayed in Mulanthuruthy for many years; after, he founded a chapel known as Vettikal Dayaro. He then left and travelled to Piravom, Kuruppampady, Puthencavu, Manarcad and later stayed in Kallada. Legend holds that he used a white horse and traveled throughout the region. He also visited Kundara, lighting a candle during rainy times. Upon his death he was entombed in Kallada Church.

== Srambikal family ==
The Another two brother staying at Srambikkal (Church building) in Kuravilangad. The one of Joseph married from Palasana family. Two sons were born to them. One married into the Kattumangadu family, and the other settled down with Thanangattil (Thanangukadu) family near Mulanthuruthy. They are popularly known as Srambikal family.

The Mor Gregorios of Parumala, Kattumangattu family and the present Catholicos Mor Baselios Joseph of Jacobite Syrian Christian Church from this route family.

== Major churches ==
=== St. Mary's Orthodox Church, Kallada ===
St. Mary's Orthodox Syrian Church, Kallada is famous for the entombed church of Mor Anthrayos. The thousands of pilgrims gathered together in the feast of Mor Anthrayos also known as Mor Anthrayos Pilgrim Centre.

=== St. Thomas Orthodox Syrian Church, Kundara ===
St. Thomas Orthodox Syrian Church in Kundara is famous for the feast of Mor Anthrayos. Many people are coming to the Occasional Memorial ceremony of the holy father to celebrate the feast without any caste or religion, also known as festival of the Land.

== Gallery ==
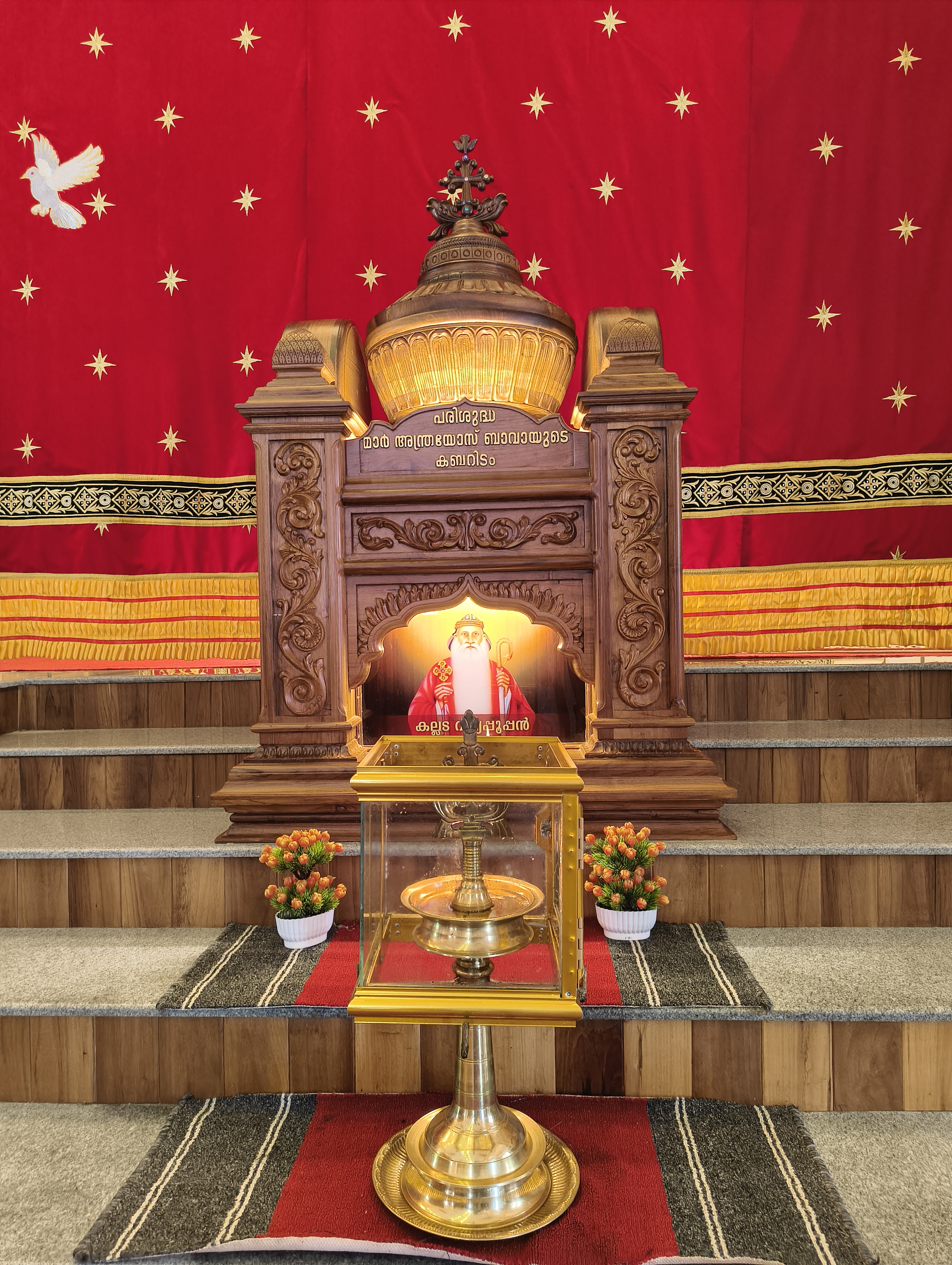
Holy tomb of Mor Anthrayos

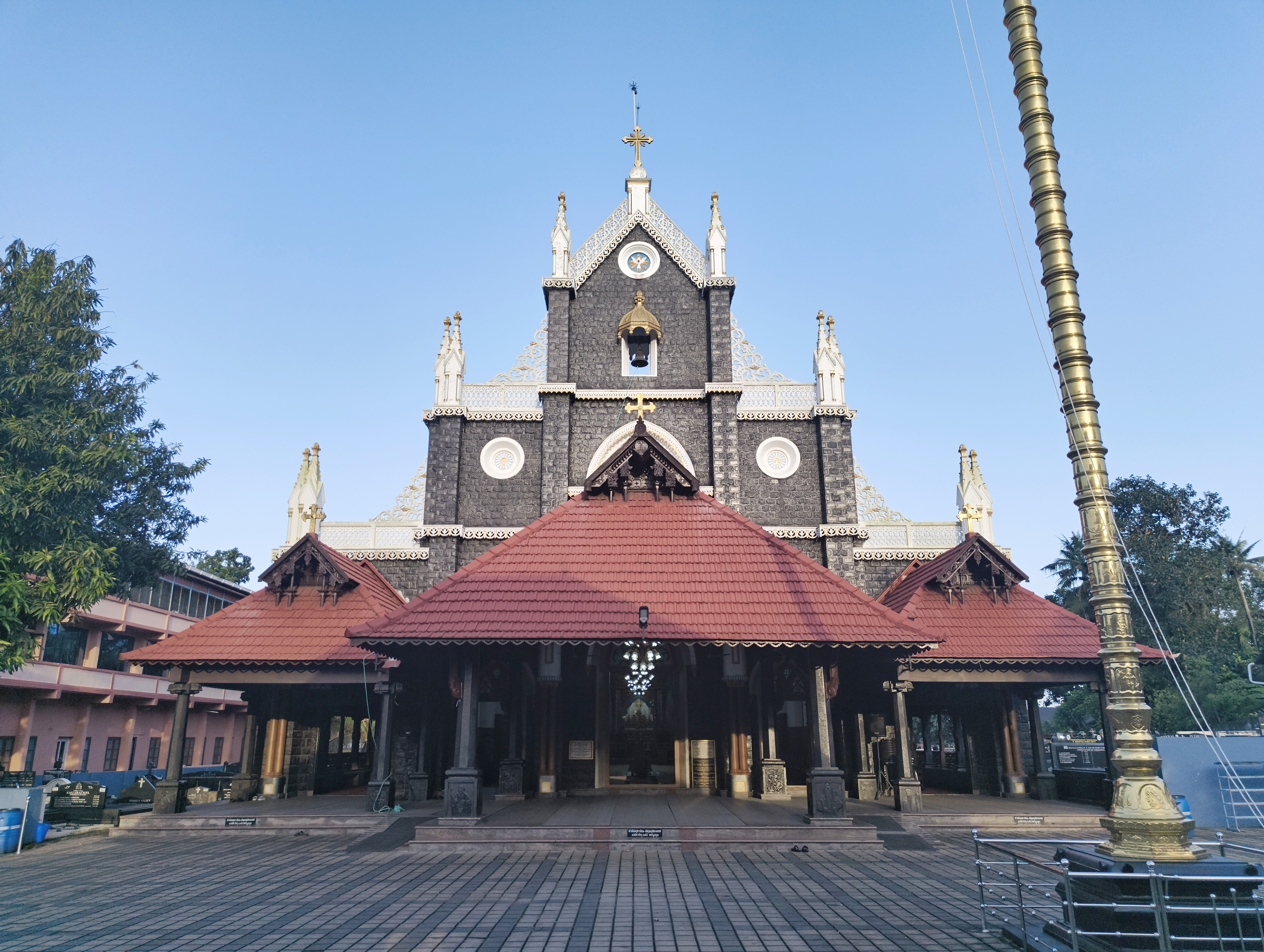
St. Thomas Orthodox Syrian Church, Kundara

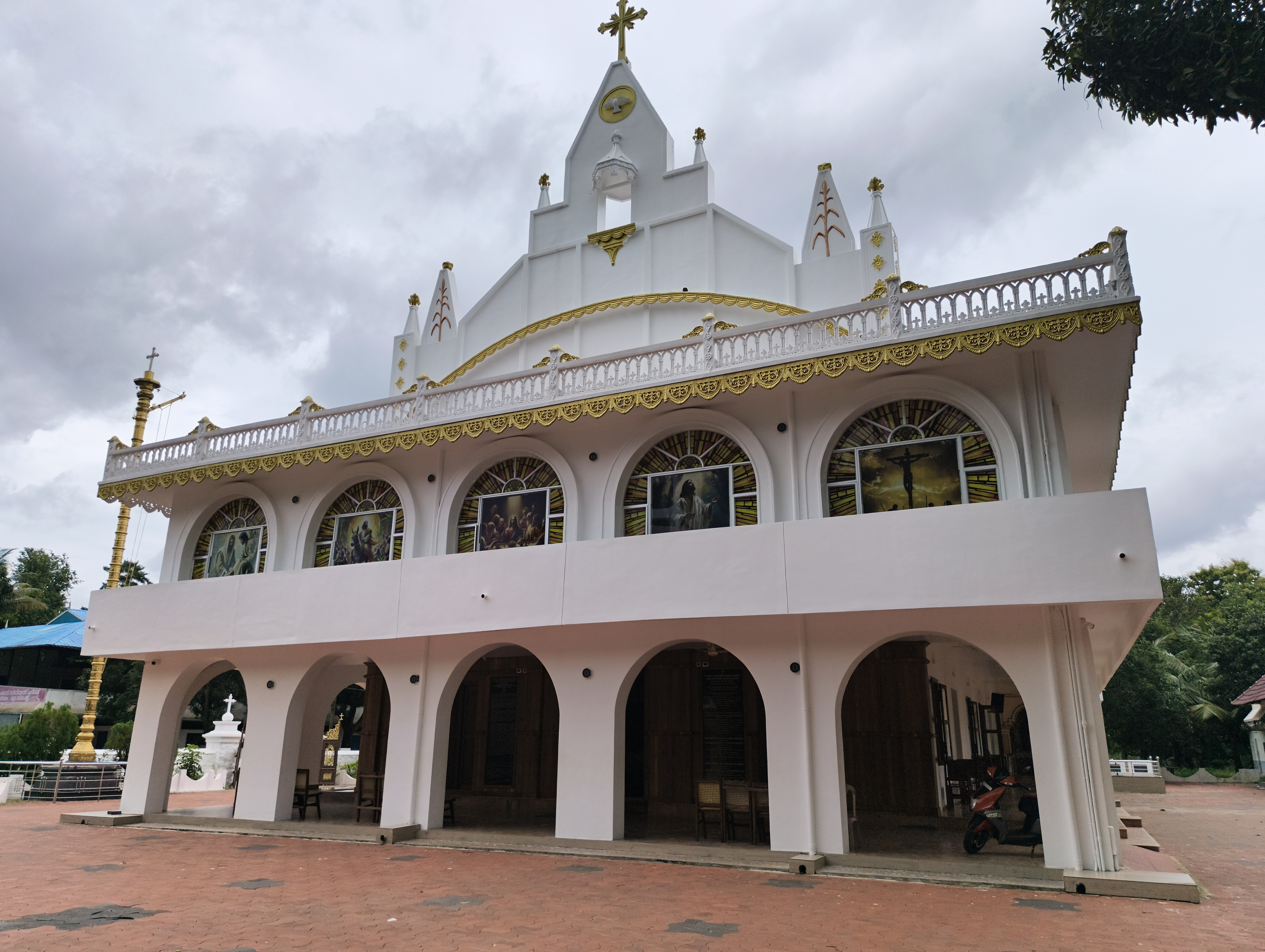
St. Mary's Orthodox Syrian Church, Kallada

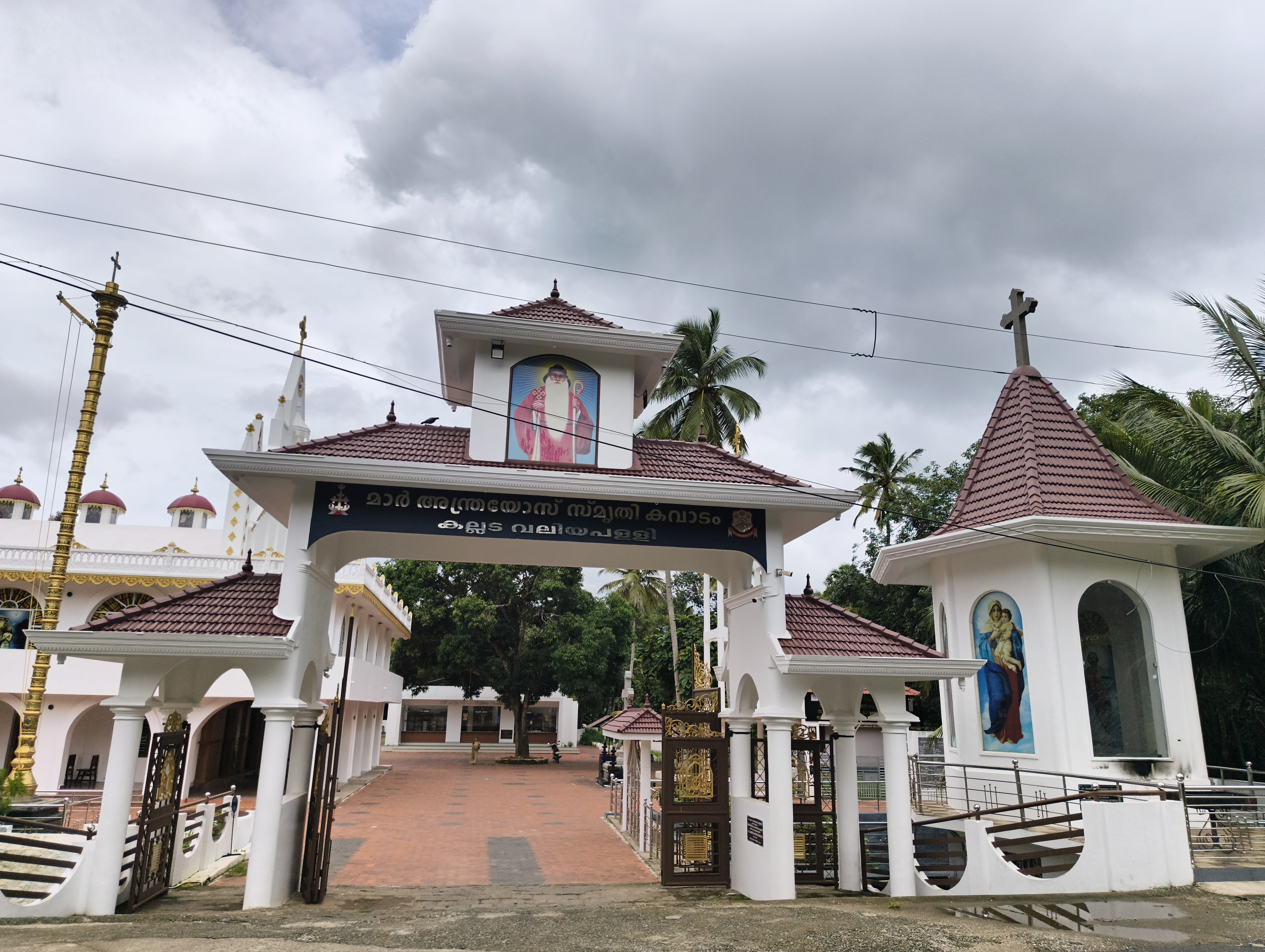
Entry arch of Kallada Church

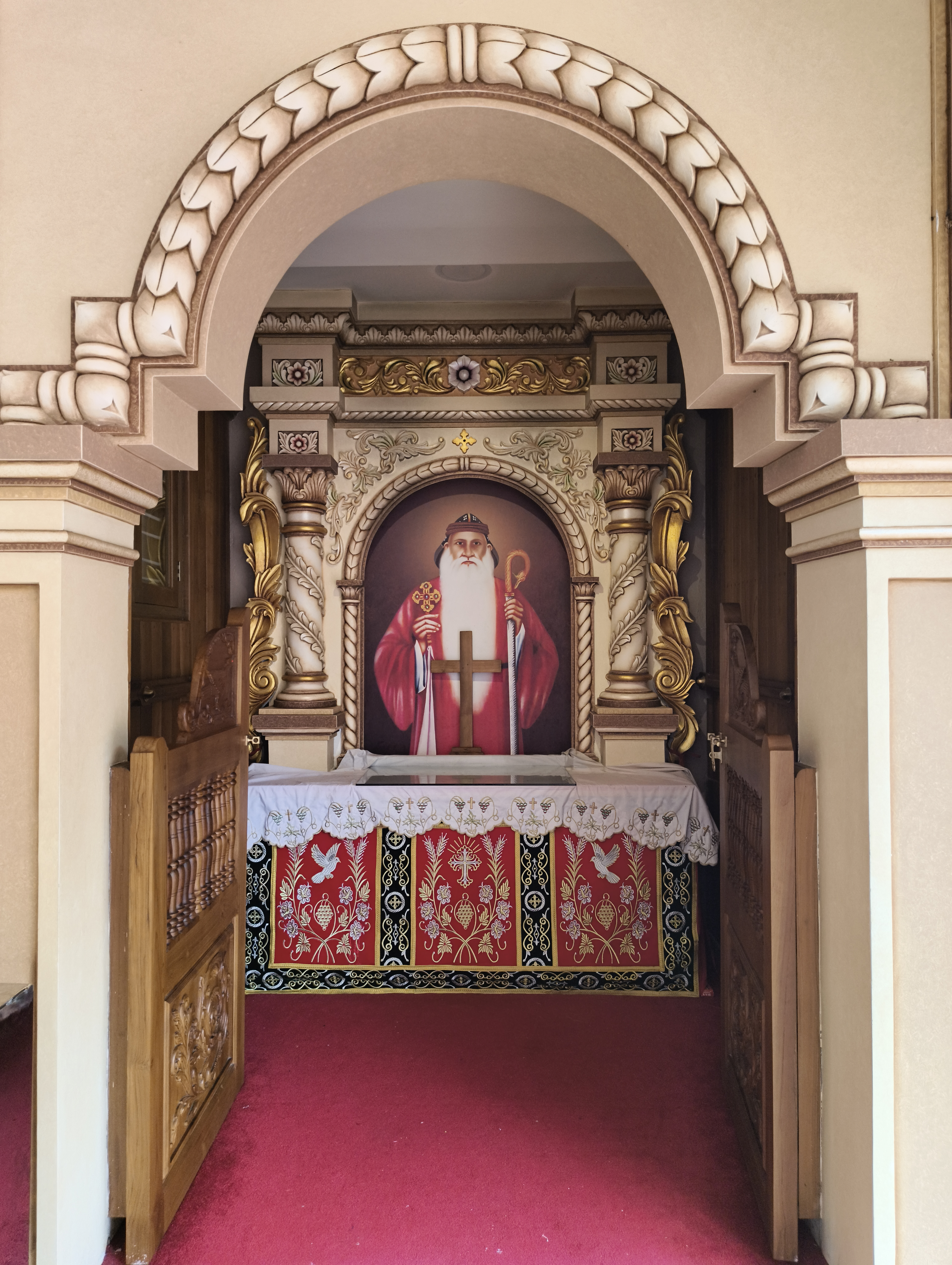
Prayer room of Mor Anthrayos

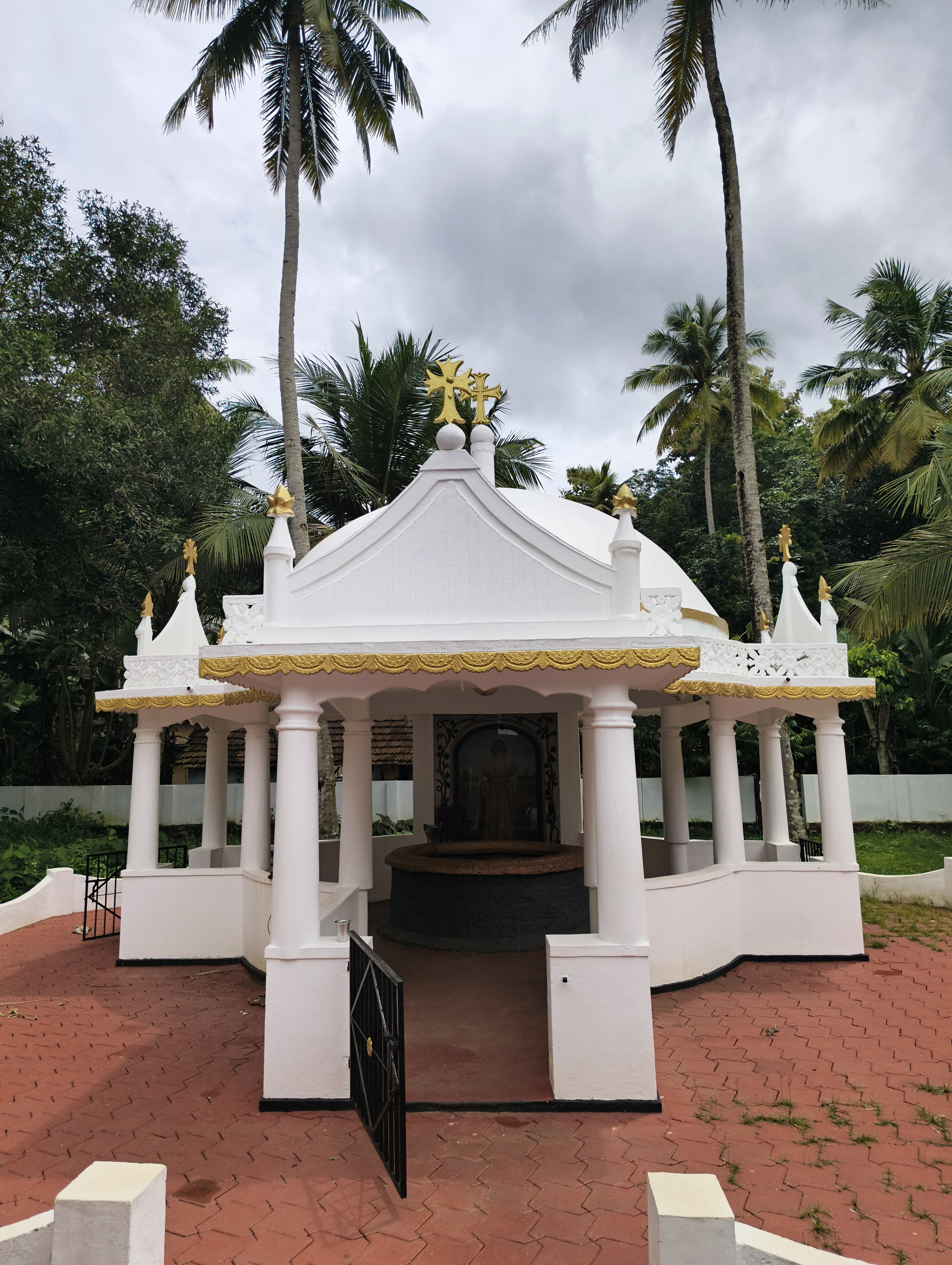
Holy Well of Kallada Church

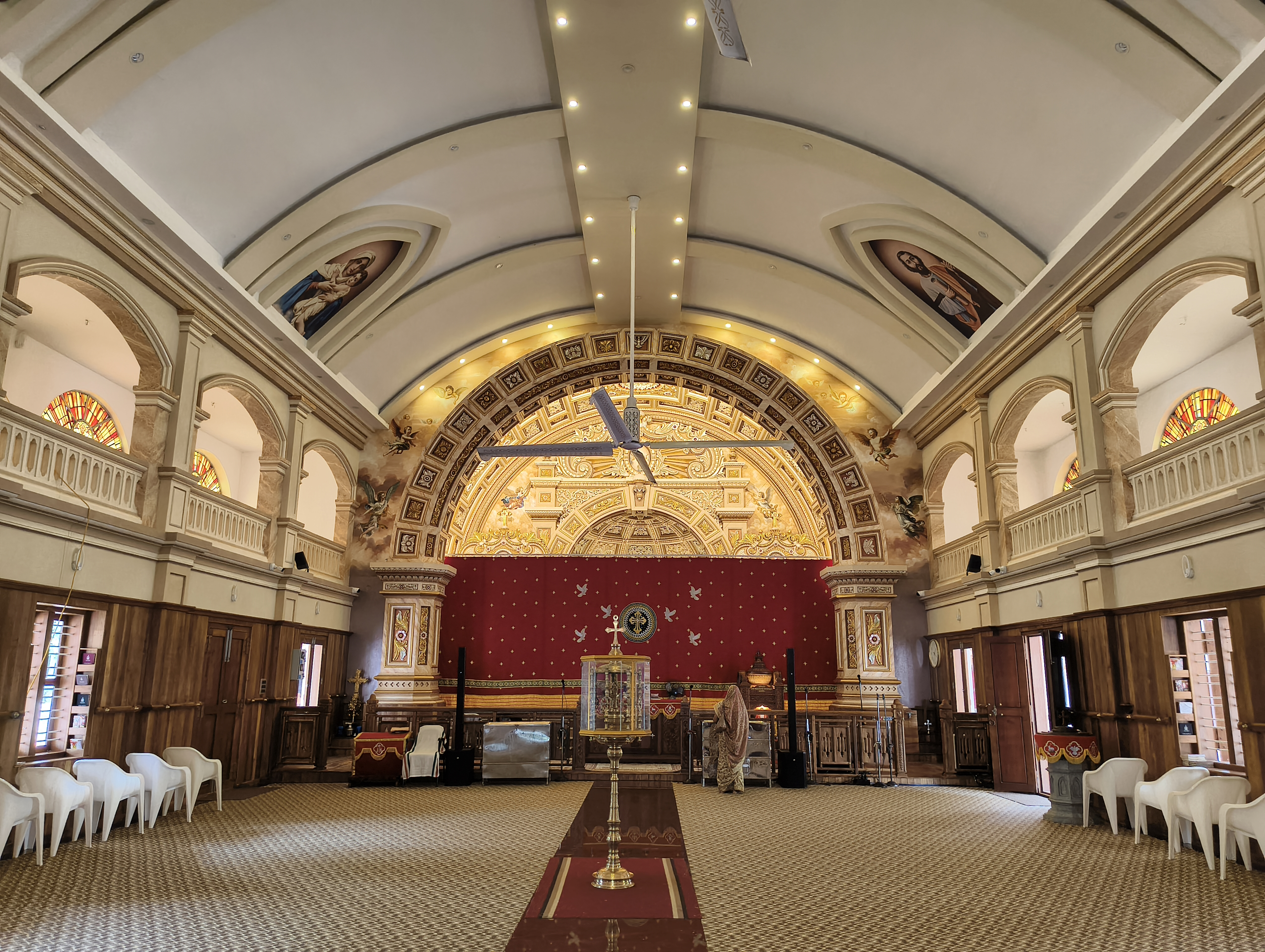
Inside view of Kallada Church

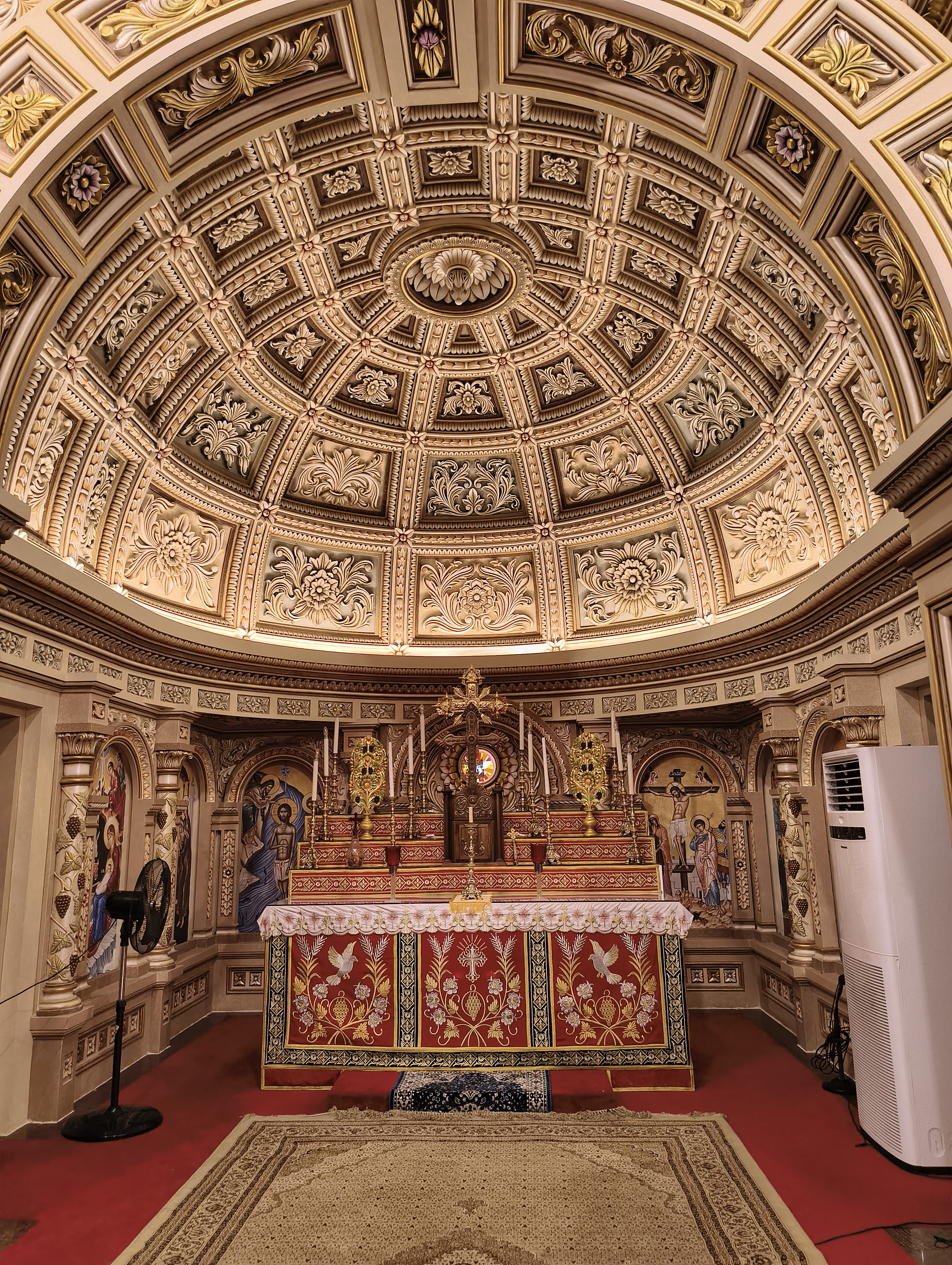
Main throne (holy altar) of Kallada Church

== See also ==
- Saint Thomas Christians
- Jacobite Syrian Christian Church
