= St. John the Baptist Church, South Parur =

Church in Kerala, India

St. John The Baptist is a Syrian Catholic church situated in South Parur, a village located on southern border of Ernakulam District, Kerala, India. This area is landmarked by the busy Kottayam-Ernakulam Road (Vaikom Road).

== History ==
The Syrian Christian tradition of South Parur dates back to the 9th century, after the Synod of Diamper, the Jacobites built a new church on the east side of the main road.

=== Holy visits ===
Many men known as Holy Spiritual Fathers visited the church, including Parumala Thirumeni, Yuyakeem mor Kooreelos (entombed at Marthoman church). The Holy Qurbana was celebrated by Geevarghese mor Gregorius (Parumala Thirumeni) in the old church. This church was also visited by Moran Mor Ignatius Zakka I, the Patriarch of Antioch and all the east during the First Holy Apostolic visit in 1982.

=== Recent history ===
The Jacobite church was rebuilt in 1991 and was consecrated by Basalious Paulose II, Catholicos of the East.

On 2008 January 5, Ignatius Zakka I, Patriarch of Antioch and all the East, upgraded this church with the title "Valiya Pally". Basalious Thomas I, Catholicos of East and several Metropolitans were present.

Now the Jacobite church is to be known as St.John The Baptist Jacobite Syrian "Valiya Pally" Church.
