= Parumala Valiya Panayannarkavu Devi Temple =

Hindu temple in Kerala, India

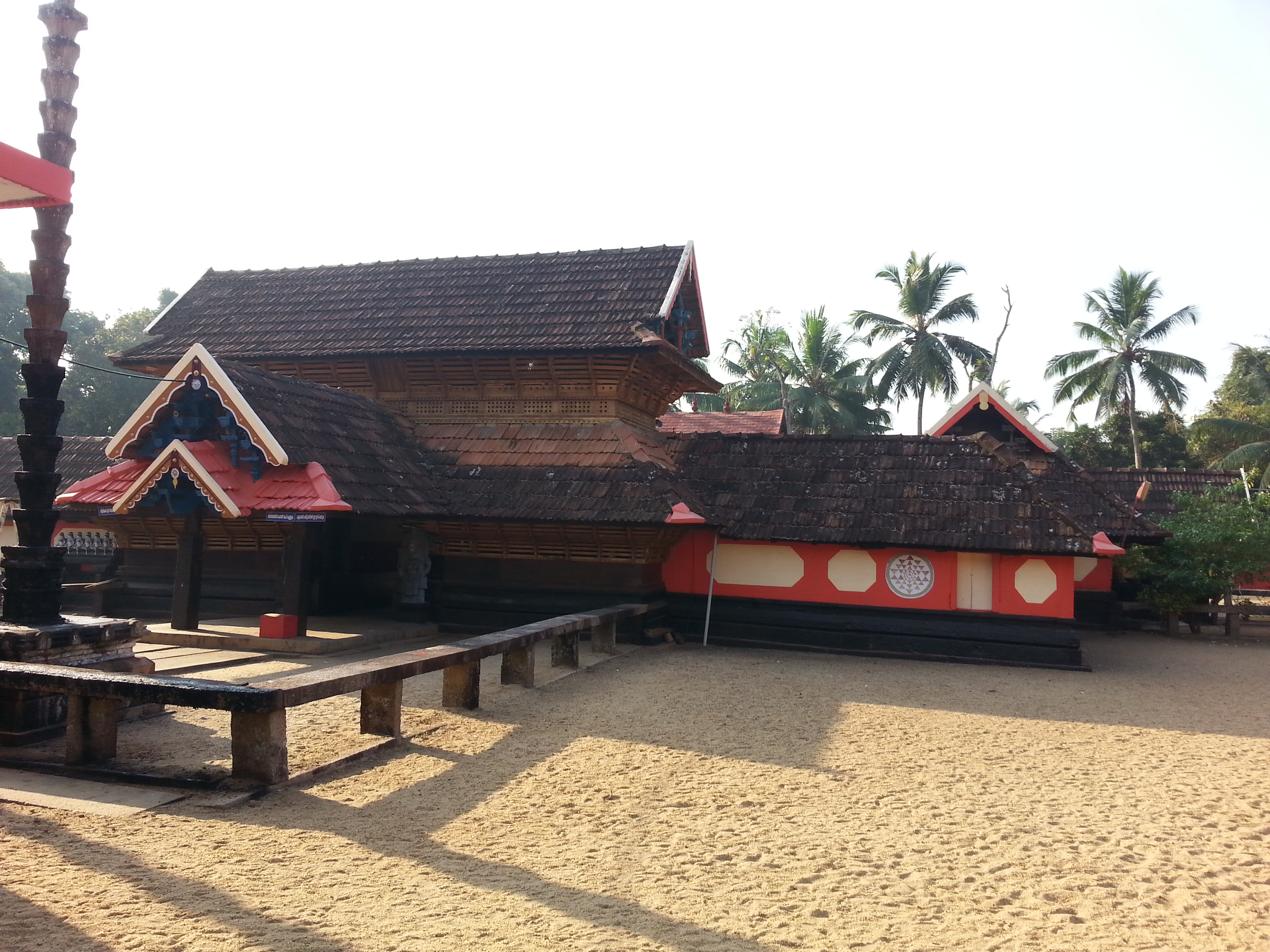
- North Nalambalam

- Valiya Panayannarkavu Devi Temple, Parumala, Pathanamthitta, Kerala

Religion
- Affiliation: Hinduism
- District: Pathanamthitta
- Deity: Badrakali, Shiva
- Festivals: Maha Shivaratri, Navarathri

Location
- Location: Parumala
- State: Kerala
- Country: India
- Interactive map of Parumala Valiya Panayannarkavu Devi Temple
- Coordinates: 9.332307°N 76.537234°E

Architecture
- Type: Kerala style
- Completed: more than 5000 years

Specifications
- Temple: 2
- Elevation: 29.32 m (96 ft)

Parumala Valiya Panayannarkavu Devi Temple (Malayalam: പരുമല വലിയ പനയന്നാർകാവ് ദേവി ക്ഷേത്രം) is an ancient Hindu temple dedicated to Sri Badrakali and Lord Shiva, situated on the banks of the Pampa river at Parumala of Pathanamthitta District in Kerala state in India. The Panaynararkavu Temple is one of the three most important Bhadrakali temples in Kerala. Thirumandhamkunnu Temple in Malabar, Kodungallur Temple in Cochin and Panayannarkavu Temple in Travancore is almost equally important. References to this temple are found in Aithihyamala of Kottarathil Sankunni and Unnuneeli Sandesam, the classics of Malayalam Literature. According to folklore, sage Parashurama has installed the idol of Lord Shiva and devi idol installed by sage Durvasa and Narada in the Treta Yuga. The temple is a part of the 108 famous Shiva temples in Kerala.

== Temple, Architecture ==
The temple is situated in Parumala village island of the Pamba River in Pathanamthitta district. The temple comprises a plot of land about four acres, surrounded by tall Palmira trees and pristine green forest. River Pamba is flowing on the west side of the temple. The temples of Lord Shiva are of great significance when inspecting temple architecture. The over-all temple complex faces north.

== Temple deity ==
Main deity of the temple is Lord Shiva; however Saptha matha (Seven Goddess) is the presiding power in Parumala Valiya Panayannarkavu Devi Temple. This is one of the temple in Kerala having Saptha matha are worshiped as the governing power in day-to-day pujas. Chamundi, the ferocious aggressiveness out of seven deities, displaying the strongest place as Kali in the temple. According to Hindu mythology, Goddess Chamundi destroys asura Raktabija and refers to Devi-Mahatma. There was a blessing him from Brahma when each drop of his blood fell on the earth from his body, will produce a new asura like him. The goddess killed and stabbed him with spear and drinking the blood.

== Temple Murals ==
The collection of mural paintings of the Panayannarkavu Devi temple is very famous in India that the murals are precision and suitable color combinations for linear accuracy. The age of these paintings are hard to find. However it believe that these crystal structure happened in two stages. Frescoes surrounding the rectangular main shrine were early paintings and paintings on the square sanctum sanctorum were completed later. It believe that temple murals were completed in the period of the last king of the Odanad (ml:ഓടനാട്) Royal House. During this period, the Vaishnava customs and the practice of pure worship were made in a more colorful, ceremonial way.

== See also ==
- 108 Shiva Temples
- Temples of Kerala
- Kodungallur Bhagavathy Temple
- Thirumandhamkunnu Devi Temple

== Temple Photos ==
Parumala Valiya Panayannarkavu Devi Temple

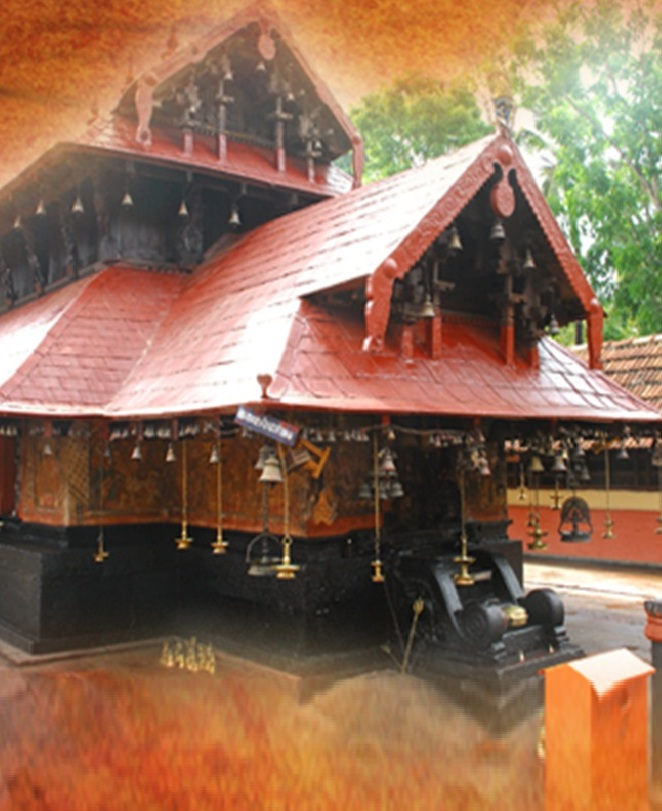
Sreekovil (MahaKali)

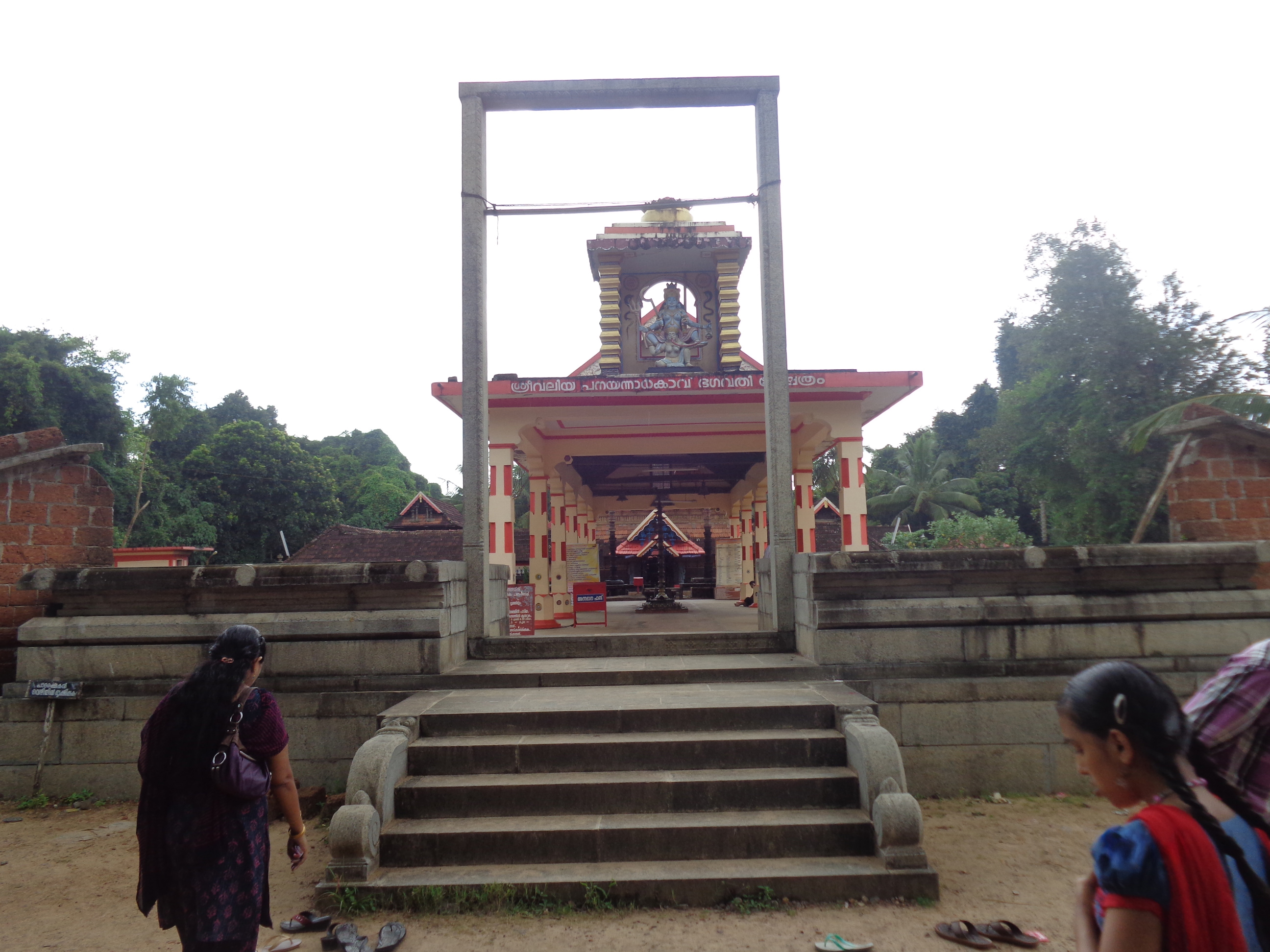
North Nalambalam (Badrakali)

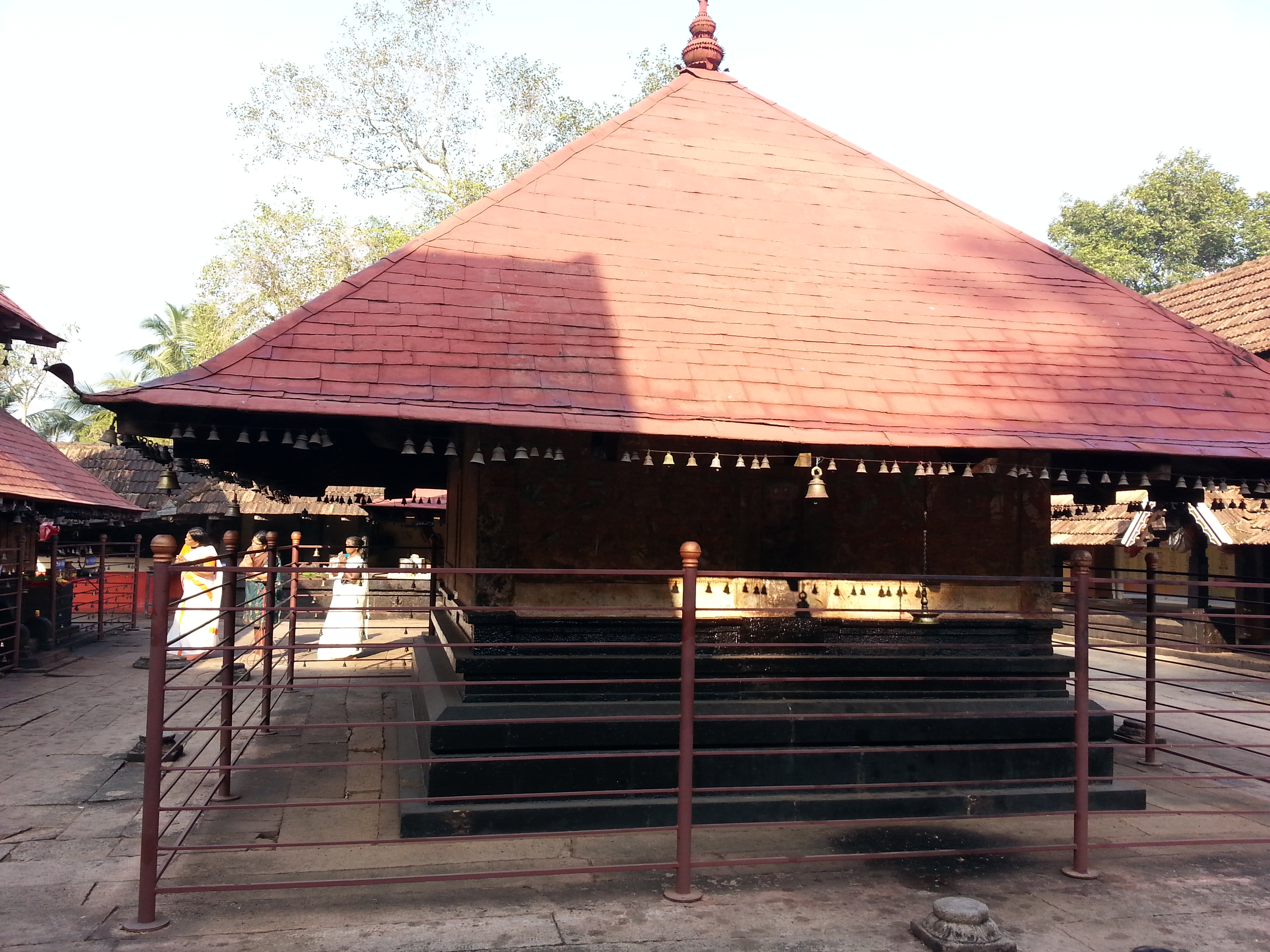
Sreekovil (Lord Shiva)

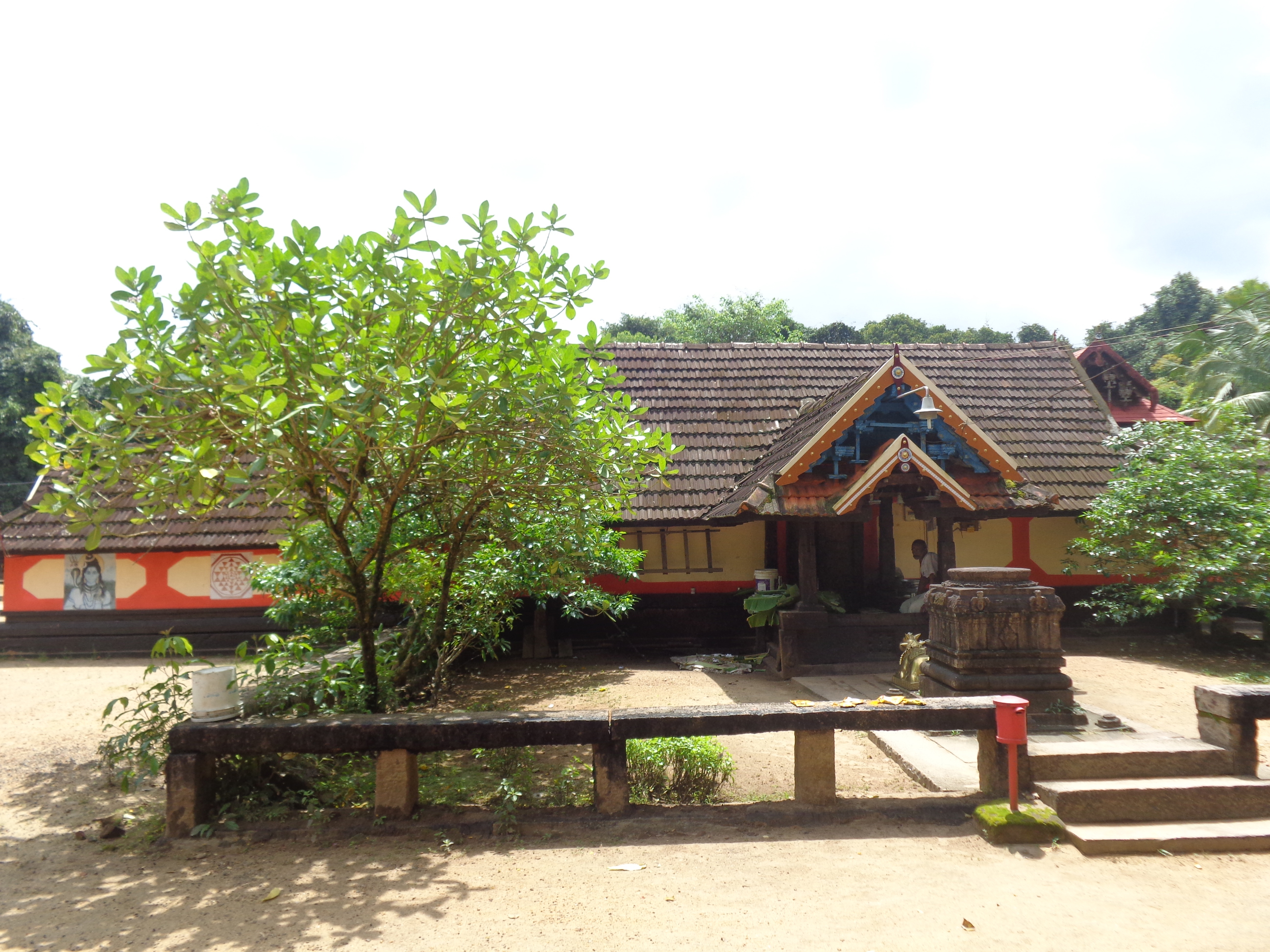
West Nalambalam (Lord Shiva)

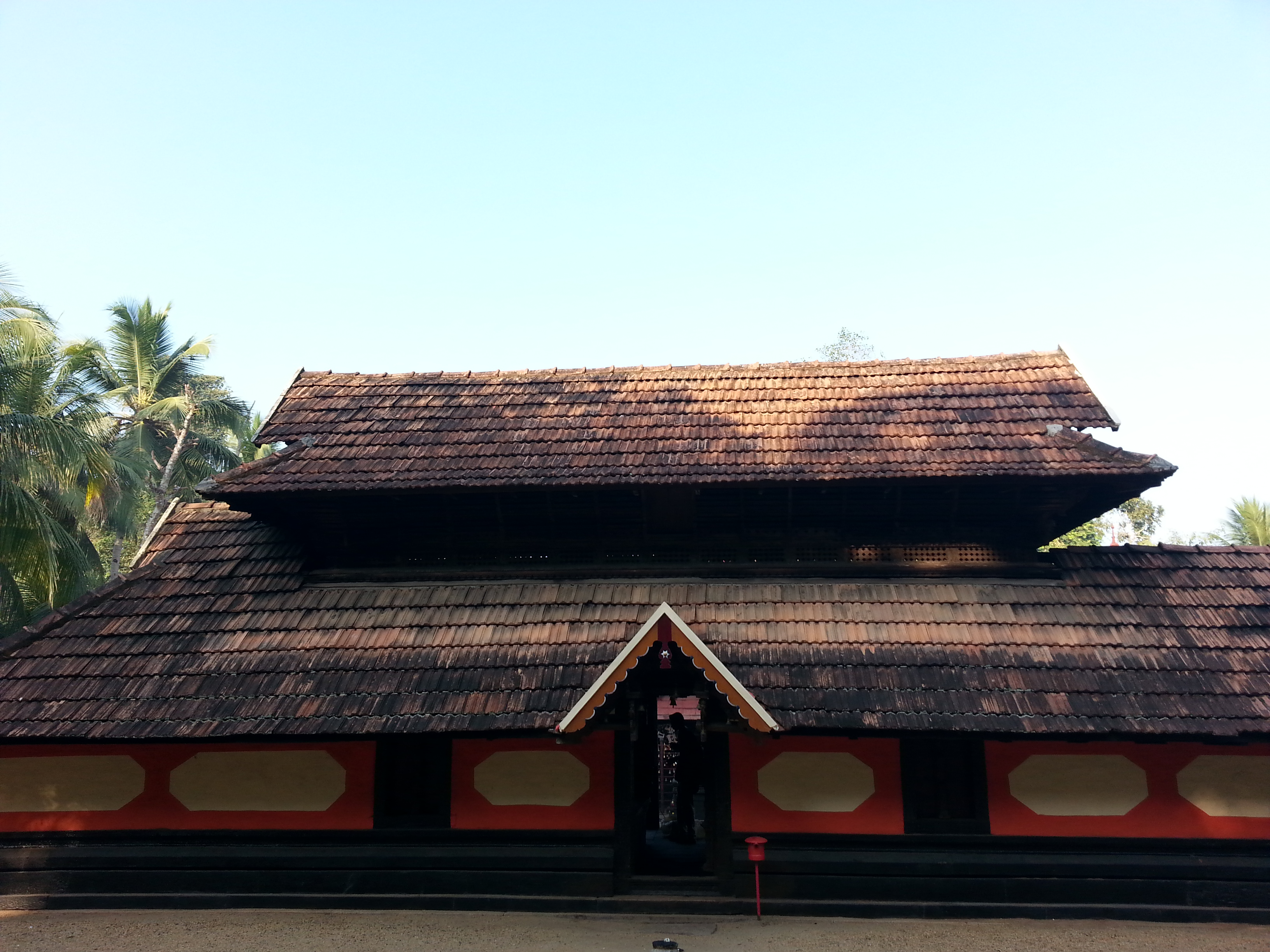
East Nalambalam (Mahakali)
