= Osthathios Sleeba Of Arthat =

18th and 19th-century Jacobite Syrian patriarch and saint

Saint His Grace Sleeba Mor Osthathios
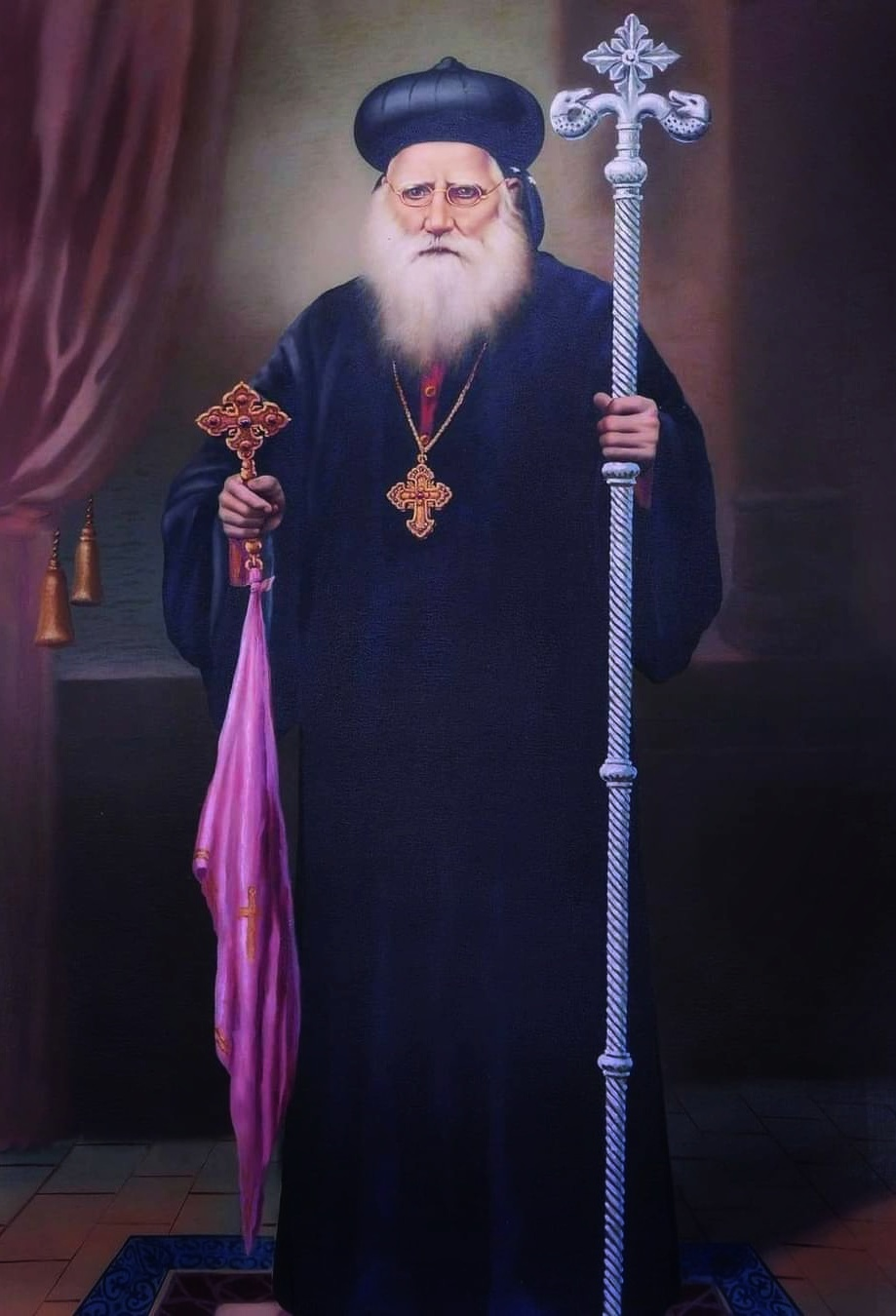

Patriarchal Delegate of Malankara
- Born: Sleeba; 1 January 1854; Amid
- Hometown: Mesopotamia (Diyarbakır); Turkey
- Residence: Puthen Pally, Kottayam; Old Seminary, Kottayam; St. Mary's Simhasana Church, Arthat, Kunnamkulam
- Died: 19 March 1930; St. Mary's Simhasana Church, Arthat,Kunnamkulam
- Venerated in: Jacobite Syrian Orthodox Church; Oriental Orthodox Christianity
- Canonized: 4 April 2000 by Patriarch Ignatius Zakka I Iwas, Syriac Orthodox Church.
- Major shrine: Arthat St Mary's Simhasana church
- Feast: 13 March
- Patronage: Jacobite Syrian Orthodox Church

Mor Osthathios Sleeba (Syriac: ܡܪܝ ܐܘܣܛܬܝܘܣ ܨܠܝܒܐ, Malayalam: മോർ ഒസ്താത്തിയോസ് സ്ലീബാ) (1 January 1854 – 13 March 1930) was a Syriac Orthodox Metropolitan who served as the Syriac Orthodox Patriarchal Delegates of India. He is venerated as a saint by the Jacobite Syrian Christian Church.

His tomb is located at St. Mary's Simhasana Church in Kunnamkulam, Kerala. His feast day is celebrated annually on 19 March. Mor Osthathios Sleeba was officially canonised as a saint by the Syriac Orthodox Patriarch Moran Mor Ignatius Zakka I Iwas on 4 April 2000.

== Biography ==
=== Early life and education ===
Sleeba was born on 1 January 1854 in Amid, Mesopotamia (modern-day Diyarbakır, Turkey). He pursued religious studies, learning theology and the Syriac language under the tutelage of Reverend Samuel Monk, the vicar of the Damascus Church.

=== Mission to Malankara ===
Sleeba arrived in Malankara Church (Kerala, India) in 1881 to assist the local church during a period of perceived theological conflict brought about by the activities of Protestant missionaries sponsored by CMS Missionaries. He served for eight years as a monk under Metropolitan Mor Athanasius Shemvun. During this era, prominent church properties, including the Old Seminary, Kottayam in Kottayam and the Cheriya Pally, Kottayam, was under the control of Protestant missionaries. Consequently, the Syriac Orthodox community established a new place of worship known as Puthen Pally.

Following a court order in 1889, control of the Old Seminary in Kottayam returned to the Syriac Orthodox Church. After the demise of Metropolitan Mor Athanasius Shemvun, Sleeba continued his missionary work in India alongside Geevarghese Mor Gregorios (later canonised as St. Gregorios of Parumala). Also, Sleeba taken the ministry to visit Holy Land for making arrangements for Mor Geevargese Gregorious(Parumala) purpose. He knows the Malayalam language to better communicate with the local populace.

== Metropolitan and Patriarchal Delegate ==
Patriarch Ignatius Abded Aloho II ordained Sleeba as a Metropolitan of Jerusalem, bestowing upon him the episcopal name Mor Osthathios Sleeba. He was subsequently appointed as the Syriac Orthodox Patriarchal Delegates of India, representing the Holy See of Antioch and the East.

His tenure coincided with a period of internal tension within the Malankara Church regarding the extent of the Holy See of Patriarch authority, specifically involving Mor Dionysius Vattasseril Metropolitan.

Mor Osthathios was active in expanding the church infrastructure in India. He established St. Mary's Simhasana Church in Arthat, Kunnamkulam, in the name of the Virgin Mary. He was also founding churches in St. Mary's Church in Vadavucodu and establishing the St. George Dayaro (monastery) in Malecruz.

== Death and Canonization ==
Mor Osthathios Sleeba died on 13 March 1930. He was interred at St. Mary's Simhasana Church in Kunnamkulam.

On 4 April 2000, the Patriarch of Antioch, Ignatius Zakka I Iwas, officially declared Mor Osthathios Sleeba as a saint of the Jacobite Syriac Orthodox Church by the Apostolic bull. No. E71/2000.

== See also ==
- Malankara Church
- Jacobite Syrian Orthodox Church
- Malankara Orthodox Church
- Moran Mor Ignatius Elias III
- Mor Dionysius Vattasseril
