= St. Thomas Orthodox Cathedral, Mulanthuruthy =

St. Thomas Orthodox Cathedral Mulanthuruthy
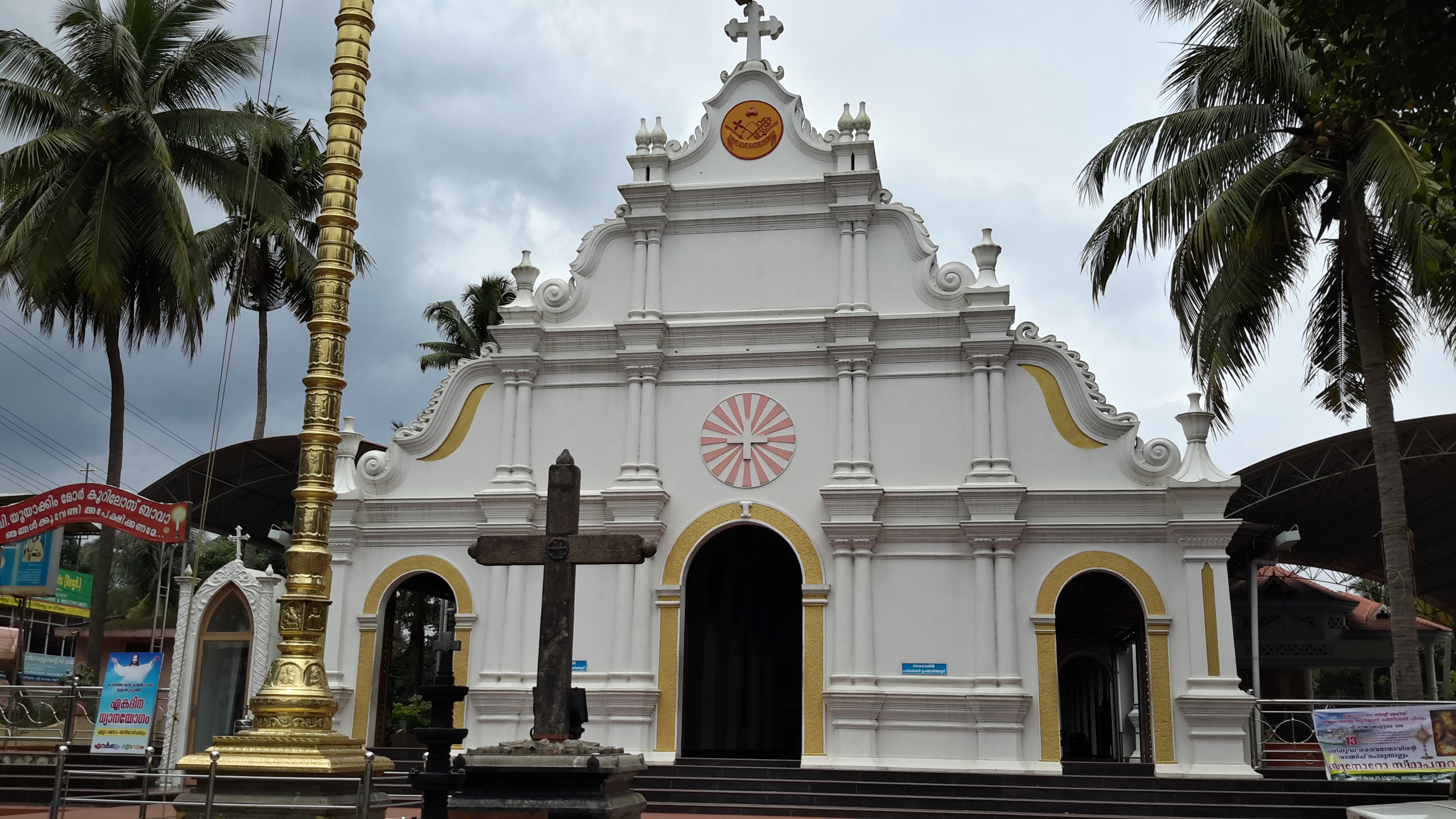
- Front view of Mulanthuruthy Marthoman Cathedral

- Location within Kerala Location within India
- 11.1750°N 75.9187°E
- Location: Mulanthuruthy, Ernakulam district, Kerala
- Country: India
- Denomination: Malankara Orthodox Syrian Church
- Tradition: Syriac, Malayalam

History
- Founded: 1100 AD
- Dedication: St. Thomas

Administration
- Diocese: Kochi Diocese

Mulanthuruthy Mar Thoman Cathedral is an ancient church located at Mulanthuruthy in Ernakulam district in Kerala, India. It is part of the Malankara Orthodox Syrian Church. This church was founded and established in the 11th century A.D. The church was consecrated on 3rd Karkkidakkam (July), in between 1100 and 1125 A.D. The church was modified in the 16th century A.D. The carvings on the main door of the church, made of granite, on which is inscribed in Syrian script, read as ʹʹthe door of the Mar Thoman Church was re-erected on 9th Thulam 1575 A.D.ʹʹ.

The church is a fine example of the indigenous Kerala architectural style. The carvings, sculptures, symbolic icons and wall paintings are a blend of Middle Eastern, South Indian (Keralite) and European architecture.

The altar of the church, featuring wooden carvings and paintings of unique design, is reminiscent of the altar in the Church of the Holy Sepulchre in Jerusalem. There is a massive sculptural covering on the eastern side of the main altar, with carvings of cherubim faces and representations of the Holy Father, the Son and the Holy Spirit.

The floor tiles are imported from abroad. The rare antique paintings on the ceiling above have their own stories to narrate.

The baptismal stand of this church is carved out of a huge granite block, and it is about a thousand years old. The two-story parish building is about three hundred years old. Its wooden walls and sculptured ceiling, as well as its strong room, have withstood the ravages of time.

The church is associated with the head circlets worn by the bride and the bridegroom during their marriage ceremonies. The practice dates back to the time of Knai Thoma and his contemporaries.

Even though Christianity was rooted in this country from the 1st century onwards, there was no constitution or rules and regulations for the church. This vacuum was filled by Ignatius Peter III, Patriarch of Antioch. He came to Malankara and convened the famous Mulanthuruthy Synod in 1876 A.D. at this church, in which, an association was formed by name Syrian Christian Association and a democratic set-up for the administration of the Malankara Church, was adopted. Holy Mooron was consecrated by the Malankara Church, for the first time in India. Holy Mooron was again consecrated here, in 1911 A.D, by Ignatius Abdulla II, Patriarch of Antioch.

== History ==
The church was established in 11th century and modified in 16th century (in 1550) by the Knanaya Tharakan (minister) Kunchacko of the Kunnassery family. Due to an altercation between the Syrian Christians and the Kingdom of Vadakkumkur Kunchacko had gathered the Knanaya of Kaduthuruthy Church as well as all Syrian Christians he could find within Vadakkumkur and moved them to Mulanthuruthy. Upon arrival Kunchacko had sanctioned the building of the Mulanthuruthy Church. Later the Knanaya were called back to their home church of Kaduthuruthy by the descendants of the King of Vadakkumkur, leaving Mulanthuruthy Church in the care of the Syrian Christians who remained there.

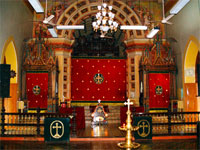
Interior of the church

The church is home to a relic of Thomas the Apostle, which was brought from Mosul and given as a gift by the then Patriarch of Antioch. The church also contains tombs of Mor Kurilos Yuyakim from tur'abdin, Mor Ivanius Hidayatulla (Patriarchal Delegates of Malankara), Mor Gregorius Yuhanan the Patriarch of Jerusalem and relics of Parumala Mar Gregorios entombed at Parumala Church and Ignatius Elias III the Patriarch of Antioch entombed at Manjinikkara Church. Pilgrims visit the church to view the murals and the tombs of holy fathers.

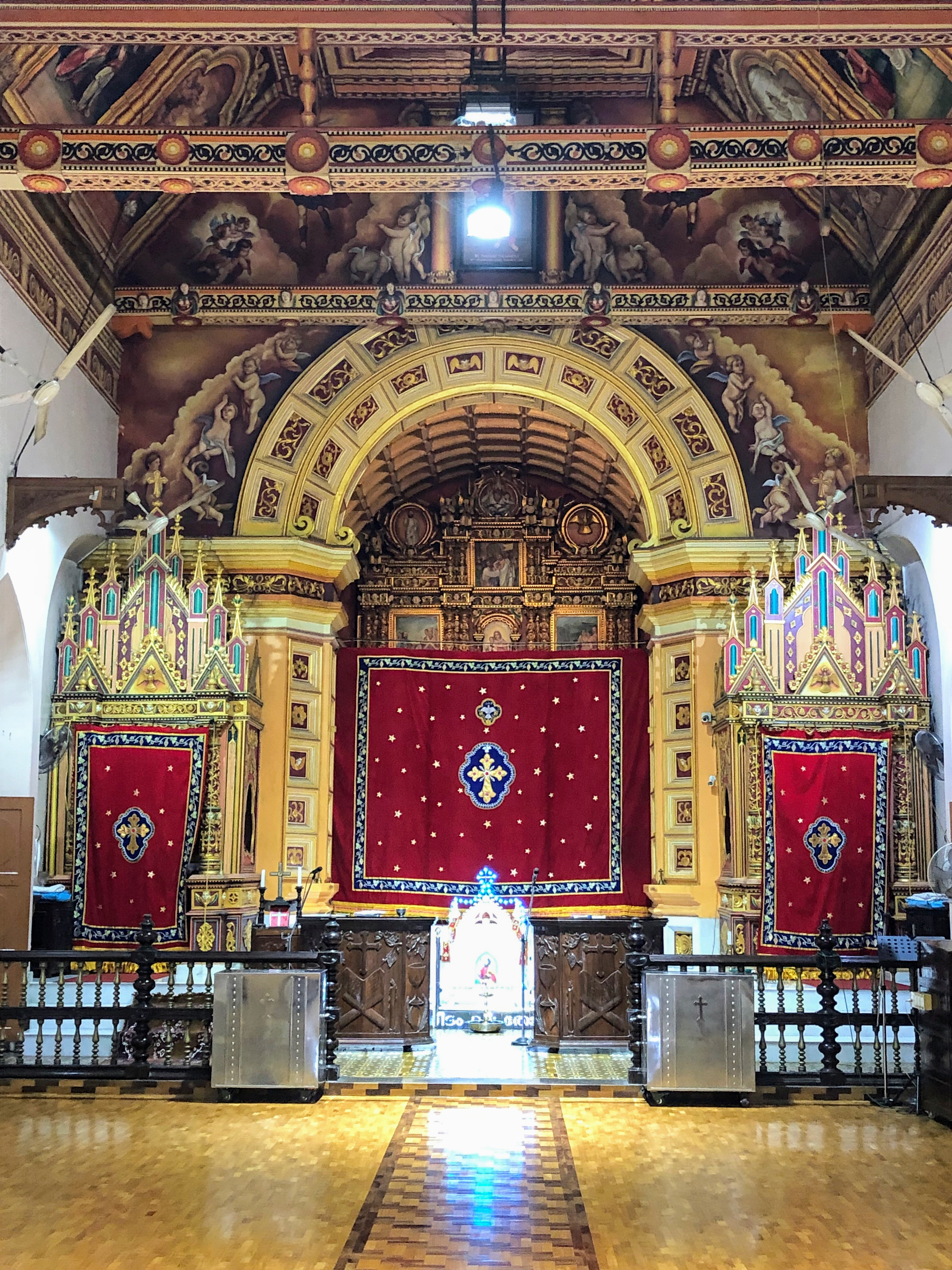
Mulanthuruthy Marthoman Cathedral Church interior

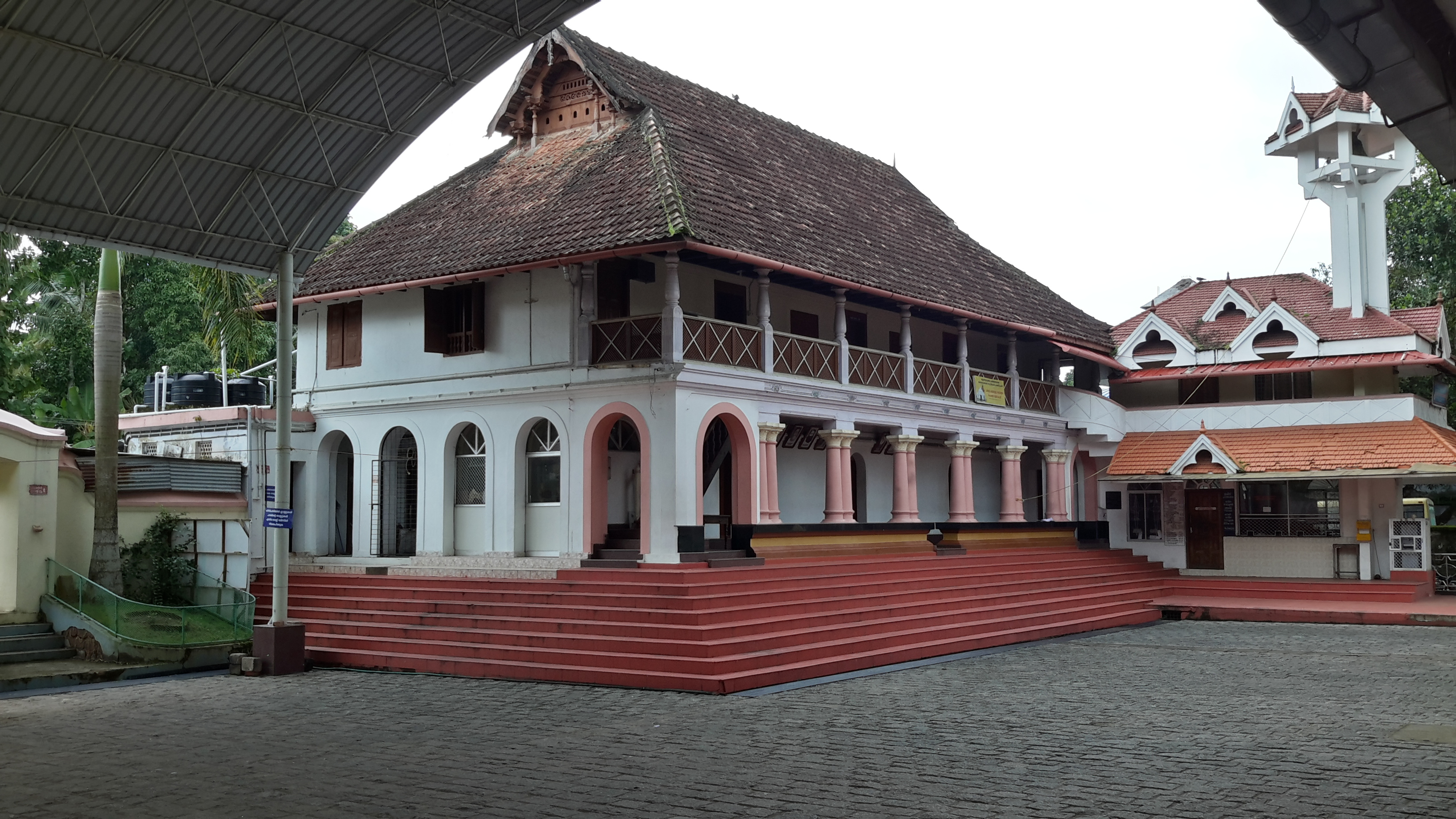
Pallimeda – Building next to the church

Mulanthuruthy church is prominent in Malankara Church history. This church was the venue of the Mulanthuruthy Synod held in the year 1876. Ownership of this church was under dispute after the splits in Malankara Church into the 2 factions of the Malankara Church and the factions had been engaged in dispute over ownership of many churches including Mulanthuruthy Church.

== Location ==
The church is situated 32 kilometres (20 mi) from Cochin International Airport. The nearest railway station is Mulanthuruthy Railway Station.

== Gregorios of Parumala ==
Geevarghese Mar Gregorios took charge of the Niranam Diocese and started staying at Parumala. He established various churches and was the motivator to establish schools in different parts of Kerala including St. Thomas School at Mulanthuruthy. On 2 November 1902, at the age of 54, Mar Gregorios died. He was entombed at St. Peter's and St. Paul's Orthodox Syrian Church, Parumala. He was added to the 5th diptych of the Syriac Orthodox Church in 1987.

On the occasion of 45th death anniversary of Geevarghese Mar Gregorios, based on the decision of the episcopal synod held in 1947, Baselios Geevarghese II, Catholicos of the East and Malankara Metropolitan declared Mar Gregorios as a saint for the Malankara Orthodox Syrian Church on 2 November 1947.

== Sources ==
- Karukaparambil, George (2005). Marganitha Kynanaitha: Knanaya Pearl. Deepika Book House. ASIN B076GCH274.
- Whitehouse, Richard (1873). Lingerings of Light in a Dark Land: Being Researches Into the Past History and Present Condition of the Syrian Church of Malabar. Kessinger Publishing. ISBN 116492317X.
