= Parumala =

- Village
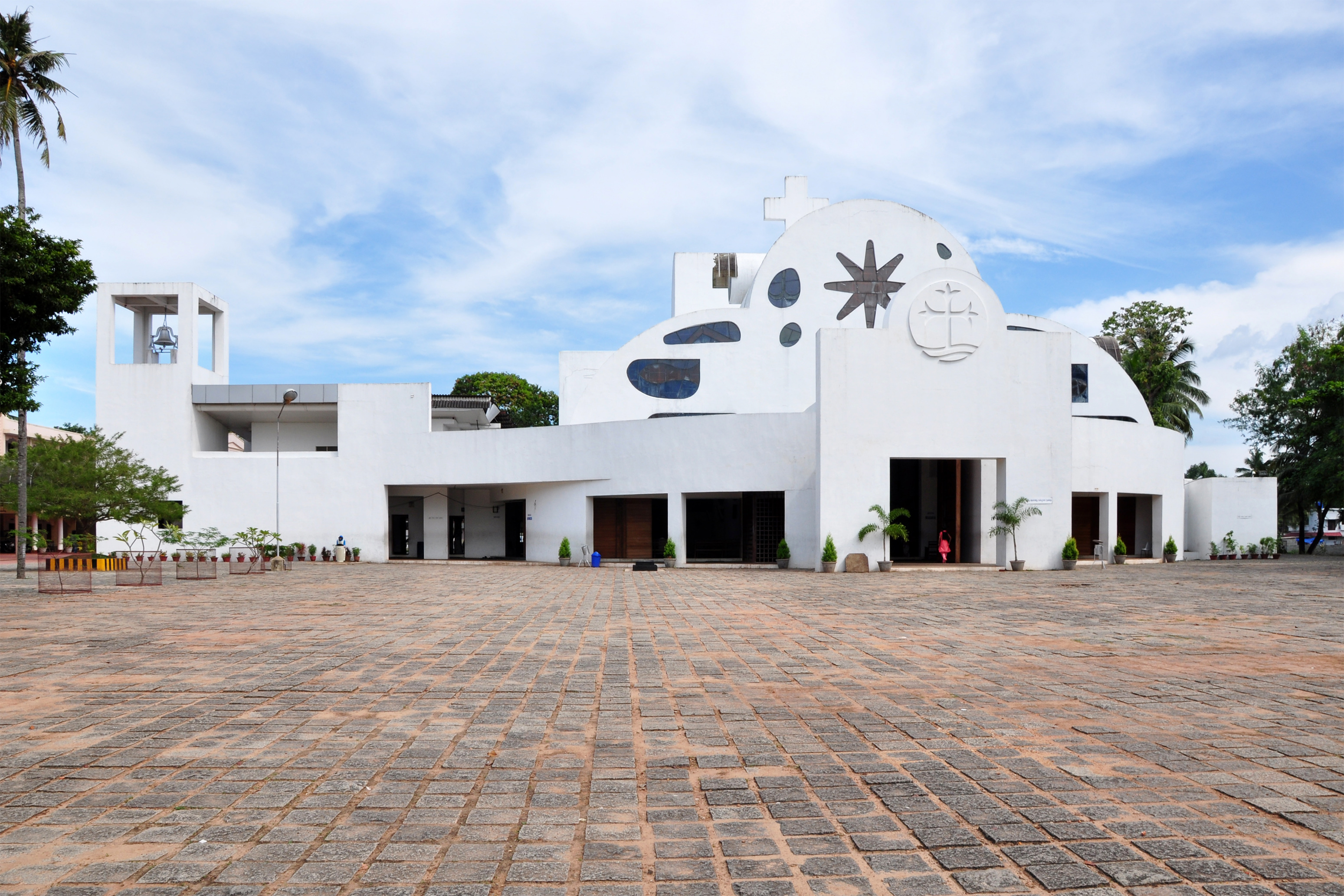
- St. Peter's and St. Paul's Indian Orthodox Church (Parumala Church)

- Parumala, Pathanamthitta, Kerala
- Coordinates: 9°19′49.4″N 76°32′30.5″E
- Country: India
- State: Kerala
- District: Pathanamthitta
- Elevation: 32.74 m (107.4 ft)

Languages
  - Official: Malayalam, English
- Time zone: UTC+5:30 (IST)
- PIN: 689626 (Parumala Post Office)
- Telephone code: +91479******* (Mannar telephone exchange)
- Vehicle registration: KL-27 (Thiruvalla Sub RTO)
- Nearest city: Thiruvalla
- Lok Sabha constituency: Pathanamthitta

Parumala is a village and island on the Pampa River in Thiruvalla Taluk, Pathanamthitta district in Kerala, India. It is a part of Thiruvalla sub-district, Thiruvalla Revenue Division & Thiruvalla constituency.

== Description ==
The Parumala Island is located in Pathanamthitta district of Kerala. It can be reached by traveling seven kilometres from Thiruvalla and ten kilometres from Chengannur. The Parumala Church located here, which houses the tomb of the Holy Parumala Thirumeni, is also a major Christian pilgrimage center in Kerala.

== See also ==
- Saint Gregorios of Parumala
- Parumala Seminary
- Parumala Church
- Parumala Valiya Panayannarkavu Devi Temple
