= Syriac Orthodox Patriarchal Delegates of India =

Syriac Orthodox Patriarchal Delegates of India or the Syriac Orthodox Patriarchal delegate to the India (for the Jacobite Syrian Christian Church) is the representative of the patriarch of the Syriac Orthodox Church, who is sent to India to guide and administer the church, or on special occasions, as the representative of the Holy See of Antioch.

== List of delegates ==
1. Ignatius Ahatullah (1653; Portuguese had drowned him in Cochin harbour before the ships even left for Goa)
2. Gregorios Abdal Jaleel (1665-1681)
  ▪ entombed at St. Thomas Jacobite Syrian Church, North Paravur
3. Anthroyos (1678-1692)
  ▪ entombed at Kallada St. Mary's Church
4. Baselios Yeldo Maphrian of the East (1685)
  ▪ entombed at St. Thomas Church, Kothamangalam
5. Ivanios Hidayathullah (1685-1694)
  ▪ entombed at Mulanthuruthy Church
6. Ivanios II (1751)
7. Baselios Sakralla Maphrian of the East (1751-1764)
  ▪ entombed at Kandanad St. Mary's Church
8. Gregorios Yuhanon (1751-1773)
  ▪ entombed at Mulanthuruthy Church
9. Ivanios Yuhanon (1751-1794)
  ▪ entombed at Old Syrian Church, Chengannur
10. Dioscorus (1806-1808; Deported by British Government)
11. Athanasius Abdul Messiah (1825; Deported by British Government)
12. Kurillos Yuyakkim (1846-1874)
  ▪ entombed at Mulanthuruthy Church
13. Athanasius Stephanos (1849-1852)
14. Gregorios Abded 'Aloho (Later Ignatius Abded Aloho II Patriarch of Antioch) (1875-1876)
15. Athanasius Shemvun (1849-1889)
  ▪ entombed at Mor Barsaumo church(Kottayam Puthenpally, Kottayam)
16. Osthatheos Sleeba (1881-1930)
  ▪ entombed at Kunnamkulam Simhasana Church
17. Yulios Elias (1923-1962)
  ▪ entombed at St. Ignatius Monastery Manjinikkara
18. Abded Ahodod Ramban (Later Ignatius Jacob III Patriarch of Antioch) (1933-1980)
  ▪ entombed at St. George's Patriarchal Cathedral, Damascus, Syria
19. Aphrem Paulose Ramban (-1964)
20. Aphrem Aboodi Ramban (1964-1977) (Later Themotheos Aphrem Aboodi Metropolitan of Canada)

== Patriarchal Delegates in Special Occasions ==
The Patriarchal Delegates of the Syriac Orthodox Church visit on special occasions of the Jacobite Syrian Christian Church to participate as representative of the Syriac Orthodox Patriarch of Antioch. Every year, the Syriac Orthodox Patriarchal Delegates participate in Manjanikkara Church Feast.
