= St. Peter and St. Paul's Church, Parumala =

Saint Peter's and Saint Paul's Orthodox Church, Parumala
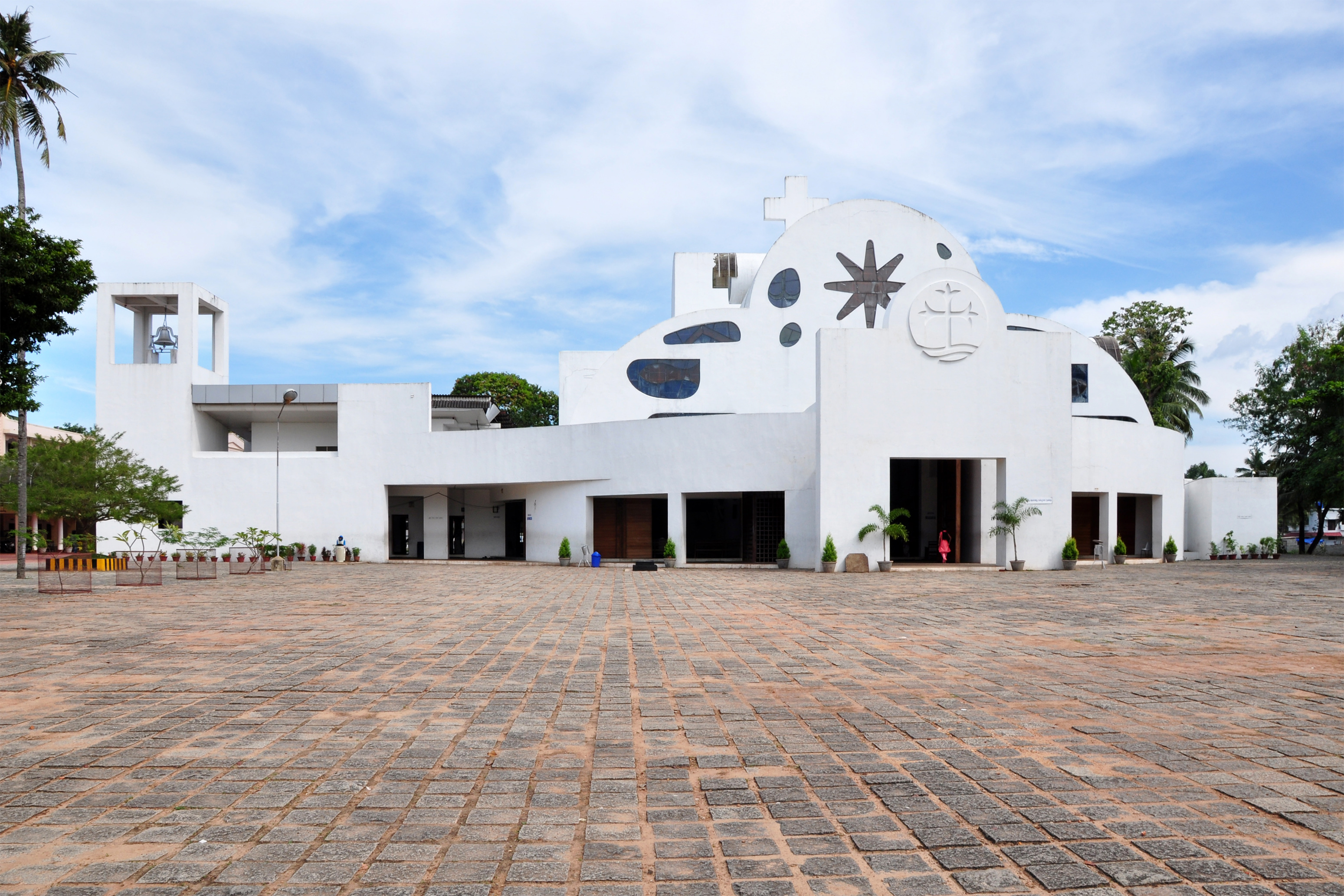
- St. Peter's and St. Paul's Orthodox Seminary, Parumala

- Location within India
- 9.3247°N 76.5369°E
- Location: Parumala, Kerala
- Country: India
- Denomination: Malankara Orthodox Syrian Church
- Website: https://www.parumalachurch.org/

History
- Founded: 1895
- Founder(s): Dionysius V, Malankara Metropolitan
- Consecrated: 1895

Architecture
- Architect: Charles Correa

Specifications
- Capacity: 2000

Administration
- Diocese: Niranam Diocese

Clergy
- Bishop: H.G Yuhanon Mar Chrysostomos
- Priest(s): J. Mathukutty, Eldhos Elias

St. Peter's and St. Paul's Orthodox Church (also known as Parumala Pally or Parumala Seminary) in Parumala, Thiruvalla Taluk, Pathanamthitta district, Kerala, India, is a pilgrimage centre and mausoleum of the Malankara Orthodox Syrian Church.

== History ==
The village of Parumala is a small stretch of land on the shores of the river Pamba. Before the church was built, the Malankara Metropolitan, Pulikkottil Joseph Mar Dionysius II wanted to establish a seminary in the area. In 1885 a two-acre plot of land was donated by Arikupurathu Mathen Karnavar to Mar Dionysius. With the land there was already a temporary church built by the Arikupurathu Family. Chathurithiyil Geevarghese Mar Gregorios decided to rebuild the temporary church into a more befitting and beautiful church.

Mar Gregorios used the personal gifts he received as well as the donations from parishes to build a church and adjoining seminary building. On the feast of the Mother of God, Gregorios temporarily consecrated the church and celebrated the divine Eucharist in the presence of Mar Dionysius V (Pulikkottil Joseph Mar Dionysius II).

The first building was called "Azhippura" and was used for teaching church functionaries for the Orthodox Church, including providing lessons in Syriac. Dionysius eventually passed the responsibility for the seminary to Mar Gregorios in order to carry on the Syriac teaching sessions more efficiently and also to help him in other church matters. The Church is dedicated to the Apostles Peter and Paul.

== Gregorios of Parumala ==
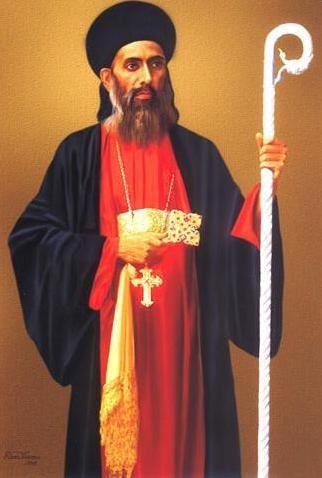
Gregorios of Parumala (1905 portrait)

The church contains the tomb of the first canonized Christian saint from India, Gregorios of Parumala, who died on 2 November 1902 at the age of 54. In 1947 he was declared a saint by Baselios Geevarghese II, the then Catholicos of the East and Malankara Metropolitan, and the church became a pilgrimage centre.

== Building ==
The church, which can accommodate more than 2000 worshipers, was designed by Charles Correa. It is a circle with an inner diameter of 39 meters, divided into three segments by two chords of 16 meters length.

In 2018 the main altar wall of the church was adorned with a large icon painting.

== Gallery ==
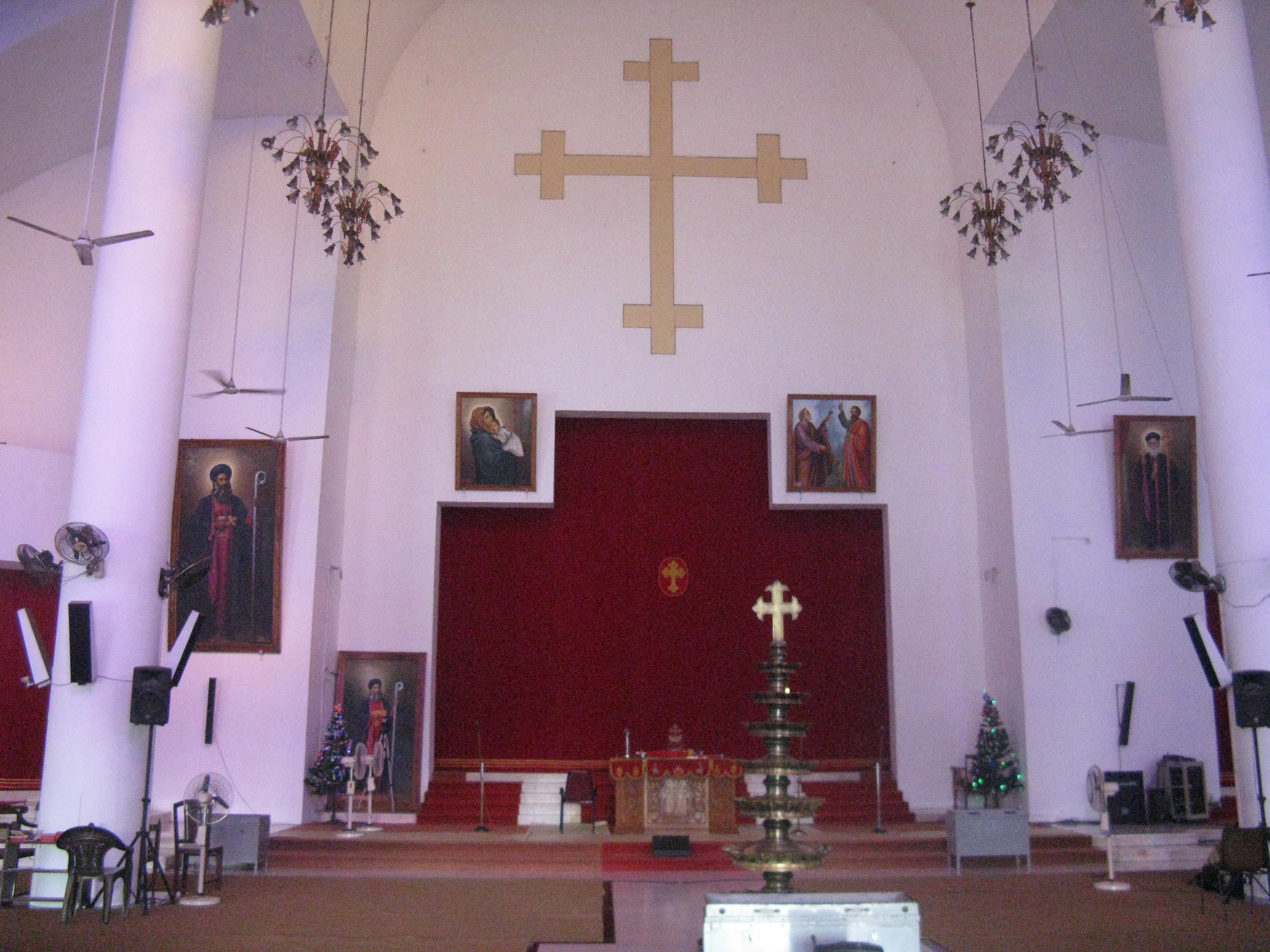
Interior of Parumala church

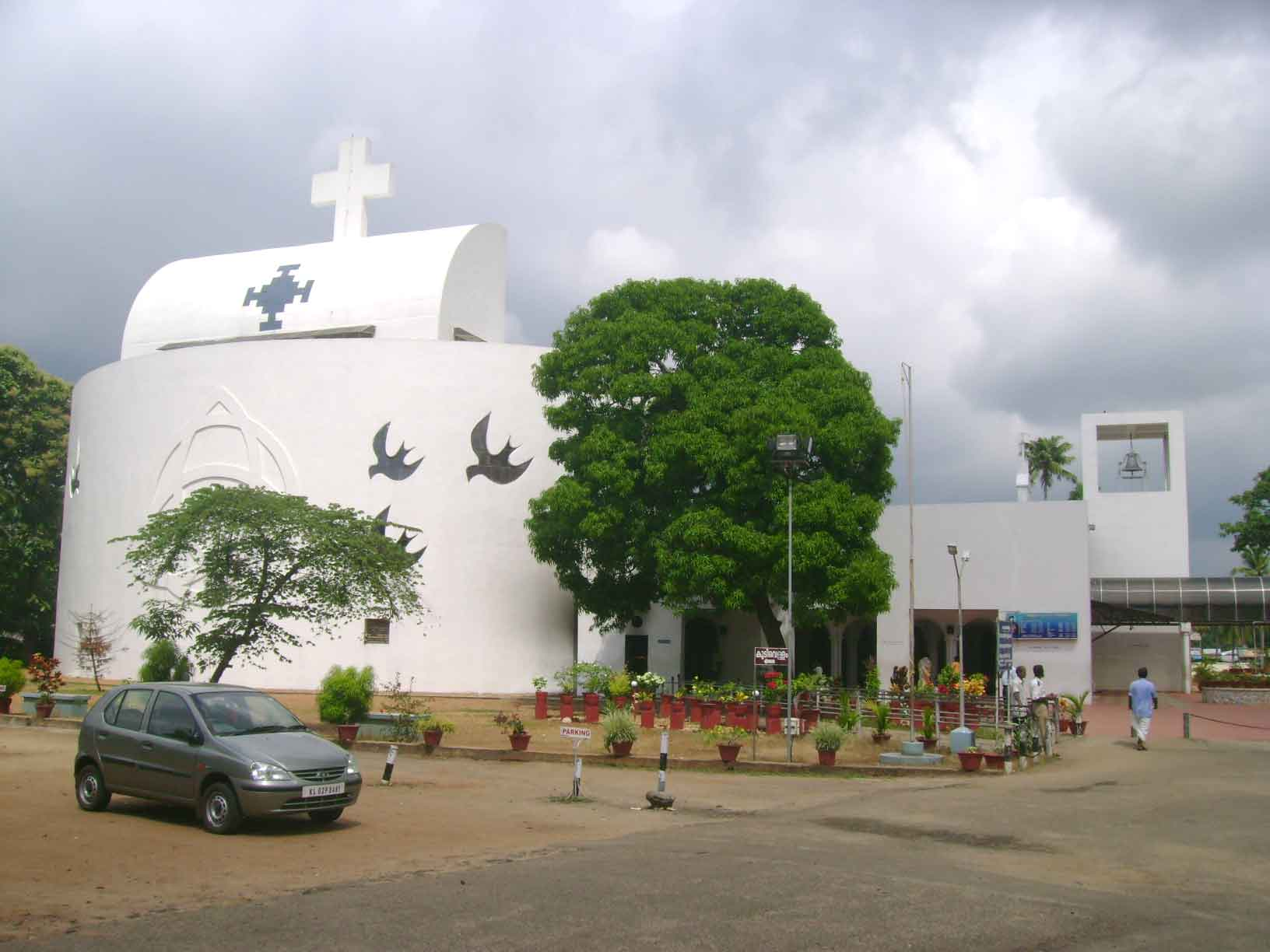
Front view of the church

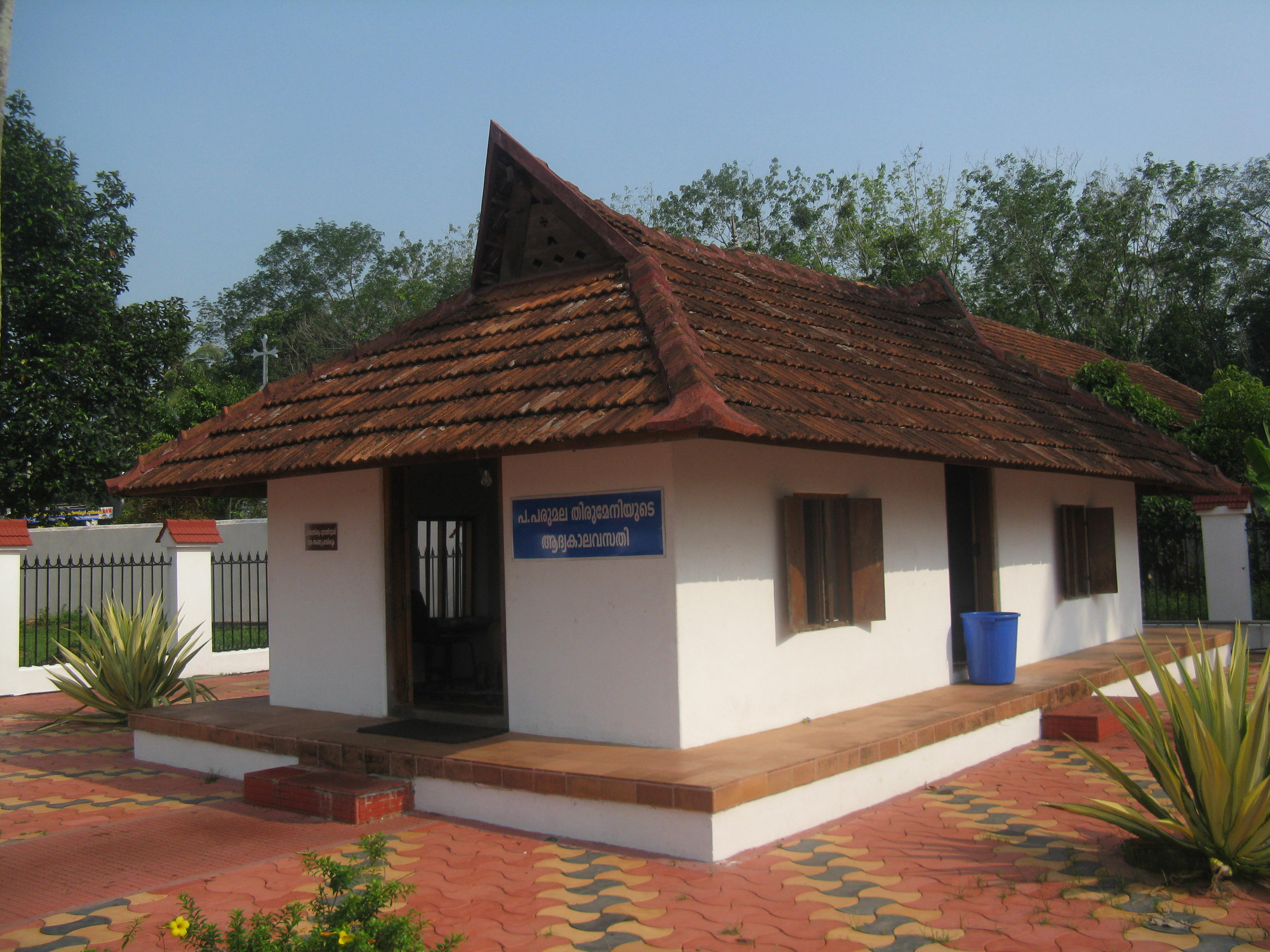
Azhippura - Small building where Mar Gregorios stayed in Parumala
