= Mshamshono =

Mshamshono, pronounced Shamshono, is a rank of deacons in the Syriac Orthodox Church. The word mshamshono means Deacon.

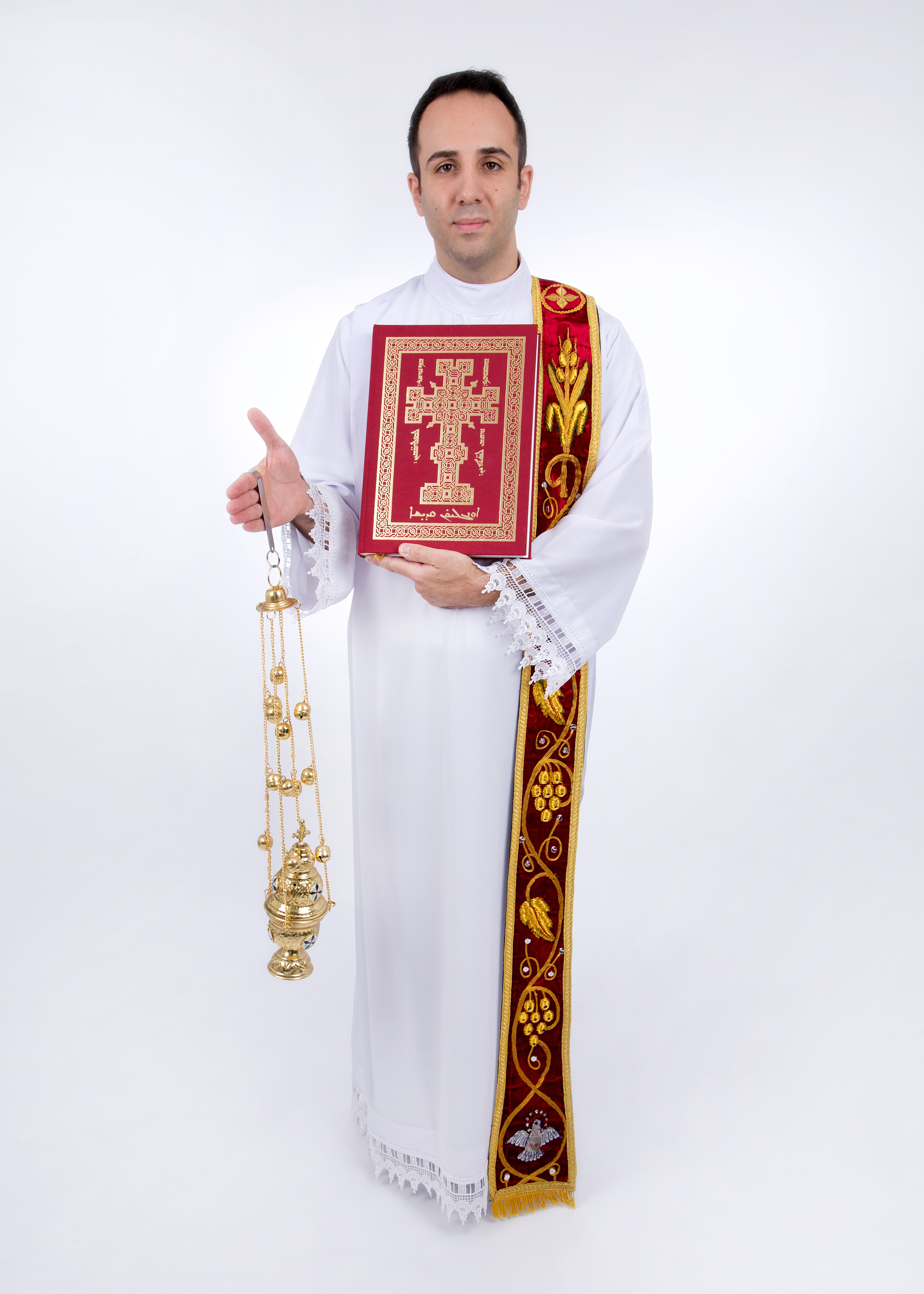
Syriac Orthodox deacon with the Orarion above the alb, a censer and the Gospel
