= Mulanthuruthy =

- Suburb
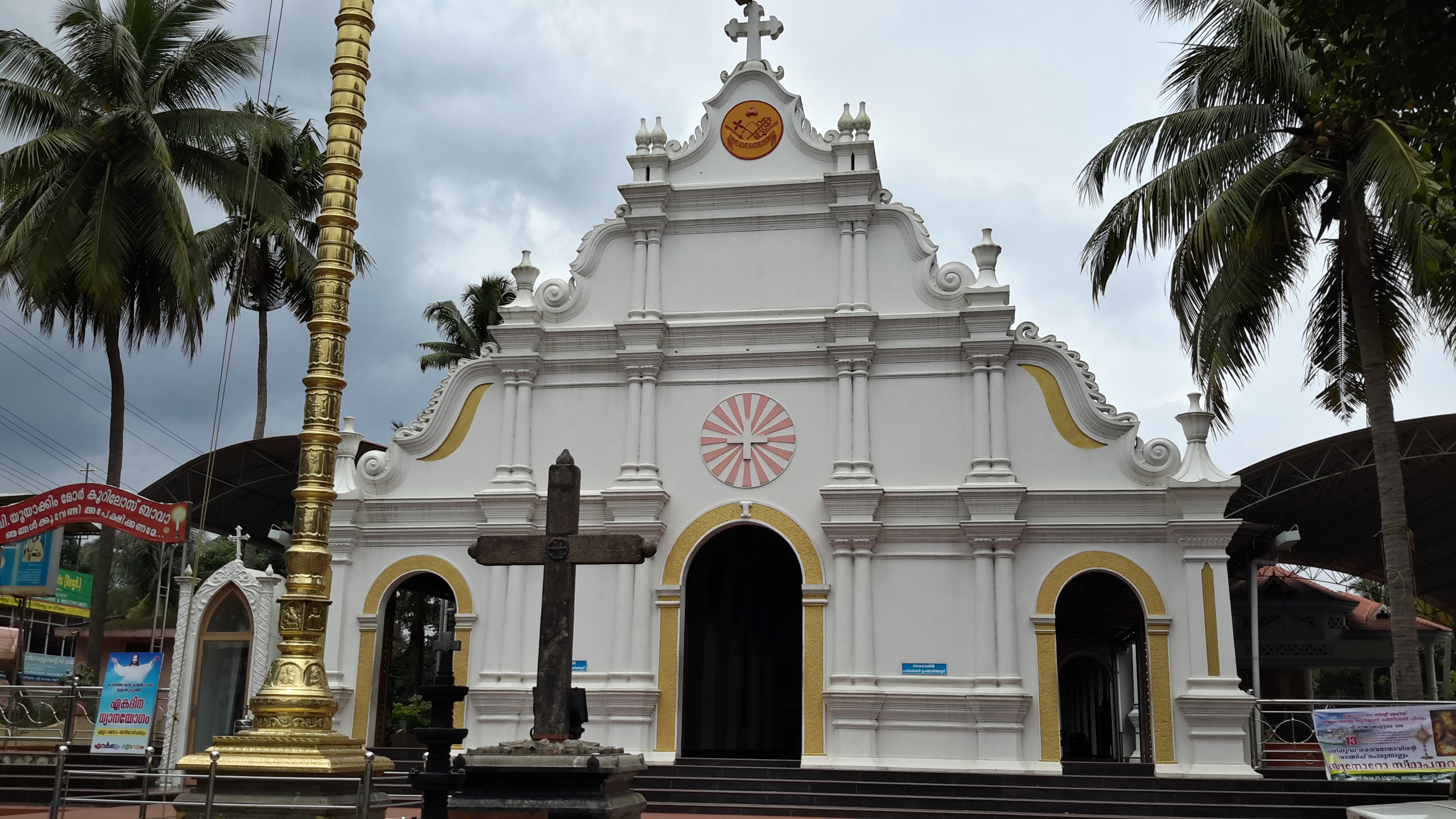

- Location in Kerala, India Mulanthuruthy (India)
- Coordinates: 9°54′3″N 76°23′24″E
- Country: India
- State: Kerala
- District: Ernakulam

Population (2011)
  - Total: 25,852

Languages
  - Official: Malayalam, English
- Time zone: UTC+5:30 (IST)
- Postal code: 682314
- Vehicle registration: KL39

Mulanthuruthy, also spelt Mulamthuruthy, is a south-eastern suburb of the city of Kochi in Kerala, India. The historic Marthoman church is located here. Chottanikkara Temple is situated nearby Mulanthuruthy.

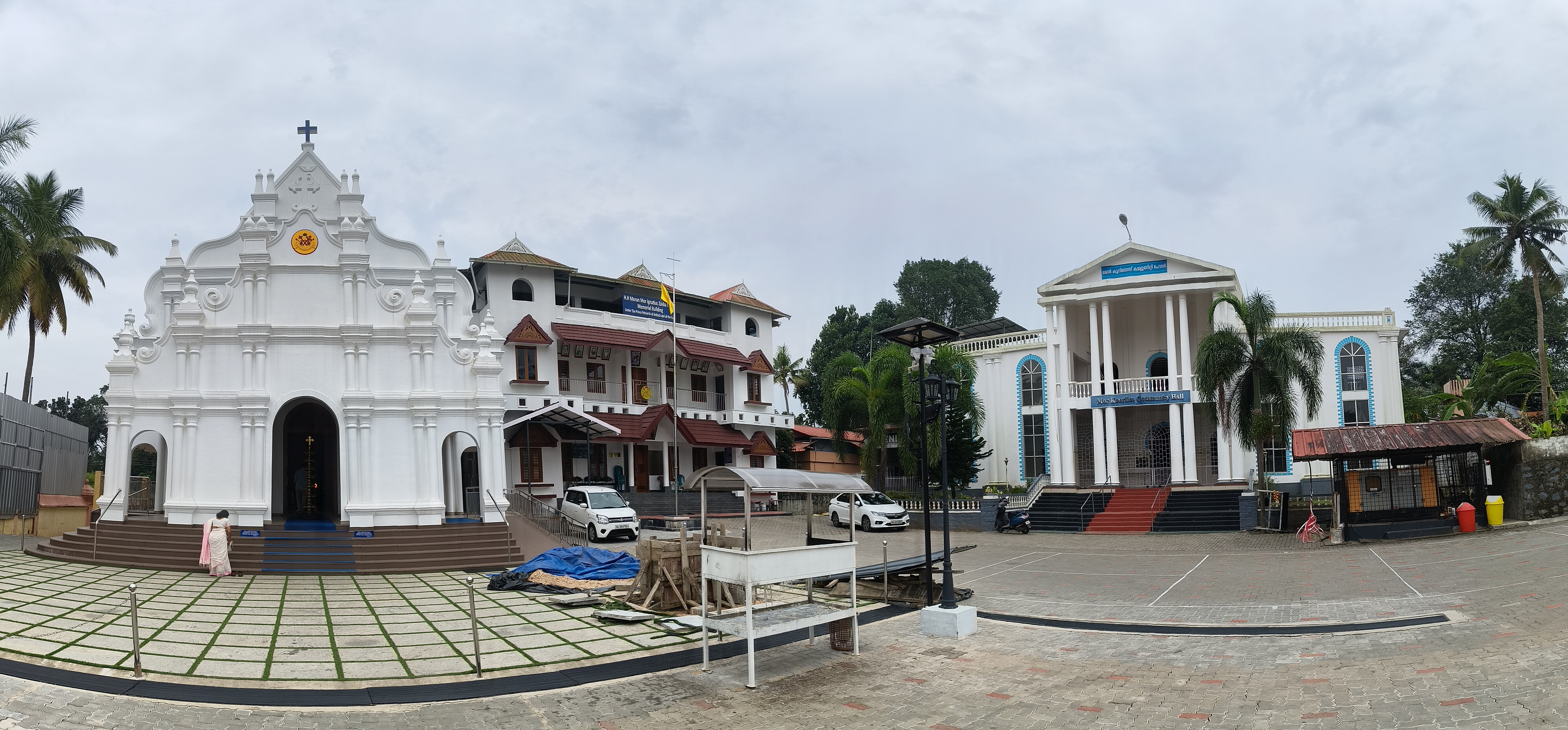
St. Thomas Jacobite Syrian Church, Mulanthuruthy, The Largest Parish of Mulanthuruthy.

== Location ==
It is about 15 km southeast of Kochi city centre and around 8 km east of Tripunithura. Mulanthuruthy is accessible by road from Kanjiramattom (5 km), Piravom (13 km), Tripunithura, and Ernakulam. It is situated on the banks of the Cochin Backwaters, part of the Vembanad Lake. A minor distributary of the Muvattupuzha River passes through Mulanthuruthy.

Mulanthuruthy Railway Station is the local railhead. Cochin International Airport is the nearest airport.

== Demographics ==
As of 2011 India census, Mulamthuruthy had a population of 25852 with 12709 males and 13,143 females.
