= Elisabeth Lukas =

Austrian psychiatrist

Elisabeth Lukas (born 12 November 1942) is an Austrian psychiatrist and one of the central figures in logotherapy, a branch of psychotherapy founded by Viktor Frankl. She has won multiple awards for her contributions and founded an institute of logotherapy in Germany, training hundreds of logotherapists

== Biography ==
Elisabeth Lukas was born on 12 November 1942 in Vienna, where she would go on to study psychology. There, she met Viktor Frankl, and later wrote her dissertation on a topic related to logotherapy. She found an interest in the topic due to becoming disillusioned with studying animals to explain human behaviours. She felt that human spirituality and individual needs were not being adequately addressed by researching rat behaviours. She has been described as "one of Dr Frankl's foremost living disciples".

Lukas moved to Germany in 1973 with her husband and children, and went on to found the South German Institute of Logotherapy in Fürstenfeldbruck in 1986, where she trained hundreds of logotherapists.

Lukas has authored 30 books, translated into 16 languages. She developed a Logo-Test to measure Viktor Frankl's principles of logotherapy, primarily the perceived degree of meaning in life on the part of the individual. The test also attempts to measure possible noogenic neurosis.

Lukas returned to live in Austria in 2003, where she worked as a therapist until 2011. In 2012 she took a position of Academic Supervisor at the Endowed Viktor Frankl Chair for Philosophy and Psychology at the International Academy for Philosophy in the Principality of Liechtenstein. She is academic supervisor of Alexander Batthyány, Austrian philosopher, cognitive scientist and psychotherapy researcher.

== Awards ==
In 1991, Lukas received the Honorary Medal from Santa Clara University in California for “Outstanding Contributions in Counseling Psychology to the World Community”. Lukas received the Grand Award from the Viktor Frankl Institute in 2001, and in 2014 she was given an honorary professorship from the University of Moscow's Institute of Psychoanalysis.

== Books ==
- Meaning in Suffering: Comfort in Crisis Through Logotherapy (1986)
- The Therapist and the Soul: From Fate to Freedom (1985)
- Quand la vie retrouve un sens, Introduction à la logothérapie (2014, Ed. Téqui - Traduction de Lebensbesinnung (1995))
- Logotherapy: Principles and Methods (2020)
- Understanding Man's Search for Meaning: Reflections on Viktor Frankl's Logotherapy (2019)
- Meaningful Living: Introduction to Logotherapy Theory and Practice (2019) with Bianca Hirsch
- A Unique Approach to Family Counseling: Logotherapy, Crisis, and Youth (2019)

== See also ==
- Joseph Fabry
