= Will to meaning =

Will to meaning may refer to:

- The Will to Meaning, a book by Viktor Frankl, founder of logotherapy
- Will to meaning (Frankl), a concept in logotherapy
