= Human condition =

Ultimate concerns of human existence

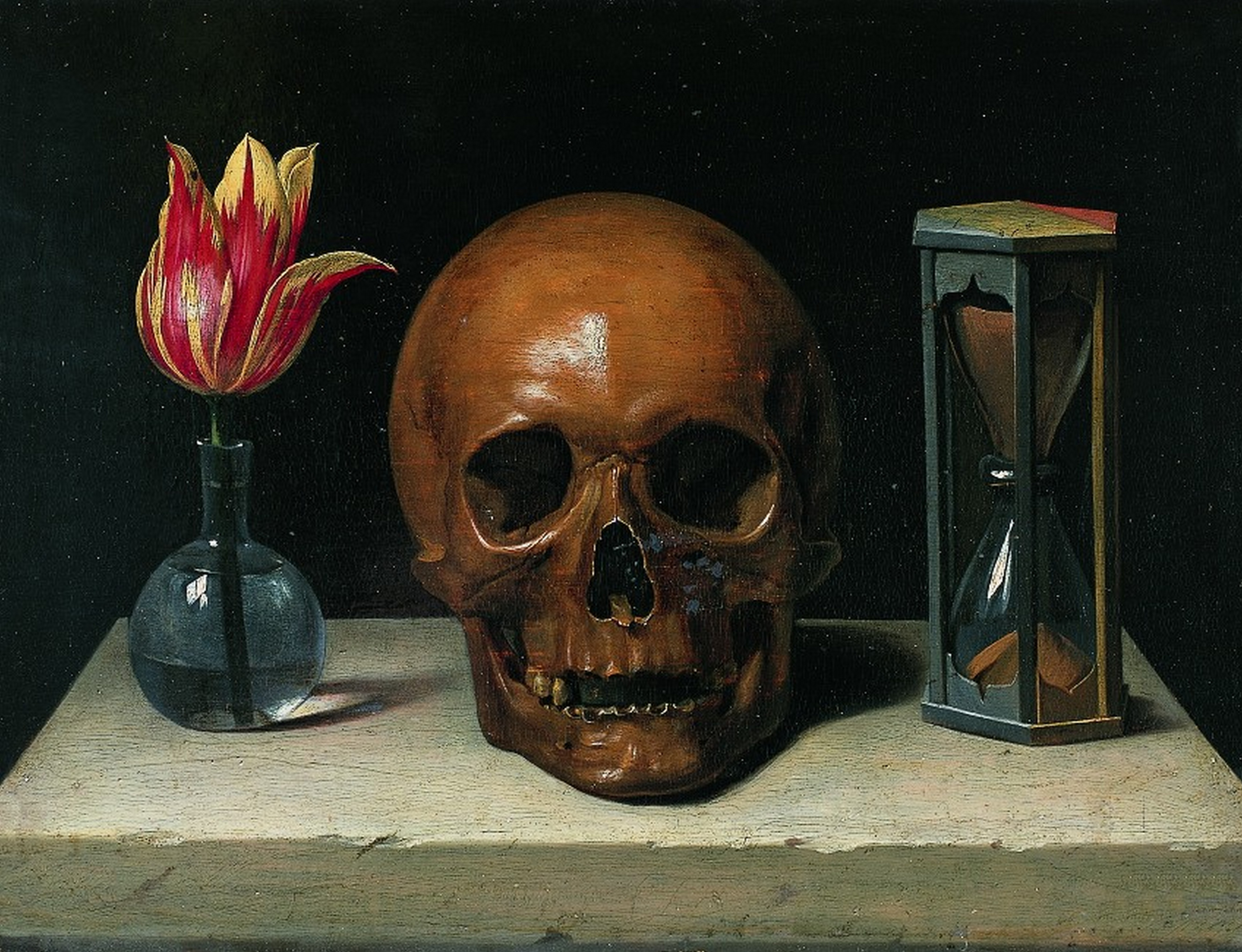
This painting, with symbols of life, death, and time, is an example of memento mori art.

The human condition can be defined as the characteristics and key events of human life, including birth, learning, emotion, aspiration, reason, morality, sexuality, conflict, and death. This is a very broad topic that has been and continues to be pondered and analyzed from many perspectives, including those of art, biology, literature, philosophy, psychology, theology and religion.

As a literary term, "human condition" is typically used in the context of ambiguous subjects, such as the meaning of life or moral concerns.

== Perspectives ==
Each major religion has definitive beliefs regarding the human condition. For example, Buddhism teaches that existence is a perpetual cycle of suffering, death, and rebirth from which humans can be liberated via the Noble Eightfold Path. Meanwhile, many Christians believe that humans are born in a sinful condition and are doomed in the afterlife unless they receive salvation through Jesus Christ.

Philosophers have provided many perspectives. An influential ancient view was that of the Republic in which Plato explored the question "what is justice?" and postulated that it is not primarily a matter among individuals but of society as a whole, prompting him to devise a utopia. Two thousand years later René Descartes declared "I think, therefore I am" because he believed the human mind, particularly its faculty of reason, to be the primary determiner of truth; for this he is often credited as the father of modern philosophy. One such modern school, existentialism, attempts to reconcile an individual's sense of disorientation and confusion in a universe believed to be absurd.

Many works of literature provide a perspective on the human condition, often portraying it as a system of tensions that characters might not fully resolve. Conflicts such as belonging versus individuality, control versus uncertainty, perception versus reality, stability versus change, and equality versus hierarchy are central to developing humanity and shaping the process of self development. Famous examples of this in literature are Shakespeare's monologue "All the world's a stage" which pensively summarizes seven phases of human life, and Fitzgerald’s The Great Gatsby where characters are chasing illusions of wealth, love, and status that doesn’t match their reality.

Psychology has many theories, including Maslow's hierarchy of needs and the notions of identity crisis and terror management. It also has various methods, e.g. the logotherapy developed by Holocaust survivor Viktor Frankl to discover and affirm a sense of meaning. Another method, cognitive behavioral therapy, has become a widespread treatment for clinical depression.

Charles Darwin established the biological theory of evolution, which posits that the human species is related to all others, living and extinct, and that natural selection is the primary survival factor. This led to subsequent beliefs, such as social Darwinism, which eventually lost its connection to natural selection, and theistic evolution of a creator deity acting through laws of nature, including evolution.

== See also ==
- Human nature
- Know thyself
