= Tragic triad =

Three experiences which often lead to existential crisis: guilt, suffering, death

The tragic triad is a term used in logotherapy, coined by Dr. Viktor Frankl. The tragic triad refers to three experiences which often lead to existential crisis, namely, guilt, suffering or death. The concept of the tragic triad is used in identifying the life meanings of patients, or the relatives of patients, experiencing guilt, suffering or death. These life meanings are analyzed using logotherapy's existential analysis with the intent of assisting the patient overcome their existential crisis by discovering meaning or purpose in the experience.

Frankl argued that all human beings at one point in their lives will encounter the tragic triad.
