= The Unconscious God =

Book by Viktor Frankl

- Cover of the 1949 German edition
- Author: Viktor E. Frankl
- Original title: Der Unbewußte Gott
- Language: German
- Subject: Logotherapy
- Publisher: Simon & Schuster
- Publication date: 1949
- Media type: Print (Paperback)
- Pages: 161
- ISBN: 978-0671220990
- Preceded by: The Doctor and the Soul

The Unconscious God (German: Der Unbewußte Gott) is a 1949 book by Viktor E. Frankl, the Viennese psychiatrist and founder of Logotherapy. The book was the subject of his dissertation for a Ph.D. in philosophy in 1948.

The Unconscious God is an examination of the relation of psychology and religion.

== Key ideas ==
The term "the unconscious God" refers to a "hidden relationship with the hidden God".

In his work, Frankl advocates for the use of the Socratic dialogue or "self-discovery discourse" to be used with clients to get in touch with their "Noetic" (or spiritual) unconscious.

Human religiousness is a deeply individual decision, and aligns with the process of discovering meaning in even the most difficult of situations.

In comparing Protestant ministers and parishioners, Frankl contends that a mature involvement with a religious group increases the sense of purpose in life.

== Published editions ==
Frankl's book was originally published as Der Unbewußte Gott by Ehrlich Schmidt in 1949; the English language version was published by Simon & Schuster in 1975 under the title The Unconscious God: Psychotherapy and Theology.
