= Diocese of Delhi =

Diocese of Delhi may refer to:

- Delhi Orthodox Diocese
- Roman Catholic Archdiocese of Delhi
- Diocese of Delhi (Church of North India)
