= Fabray =

Fabray is a surname. Notable people with the surname include:

- Nanette Fabray (1920-2018), American actress, comedian, singer, dancer, and activist
- Quinn Fabray, a fictional character from the musical comedy-drama TV series Glee

== See also ==
- Fabry
