= Statue of Responsibility =

Proposed monument

The Statue of Responsibility is a proposed monument that is meant to complement the Statue of Liberty. Inspired by the Austrian neurologist, psychologist, philosopher, and Holocaust survivor Viktor Frankl, the project was endorsed by the governor of Utah in 2023, and it is planned to be built on the site of a former prison.

In his book Man's Search for Meaning, Frankl states:

Freedom, however, is not the last word. Freedom is only part of the story and half of the truth. Freedom is but the negative aspect of the whole phenomenon whose positive aspect is responsibleness. In fact, freedom is in danger of degenerating into mere arbitrariness unless it is lived in terms of responsibleness. That is why I recommend that the Statue of Liberty on the East Coast be supplemented by a Statue of Responsibility on the West Coast.

Frankl's concept for the statue grew in popularity after the publication of Man's Search for Meaning, and drew the affection of Stephen Covey, author of The 7 Habits of Highly Effective People. Covey teamed up with Kevin Hall to push the idea of the statue forward in the 1990s, and eventually commissioned the sculptor Gary Lee Price, who came up with the concept of two hands clasped together, one lifting the other up, symbolizing the need for people to help each other. The edge of the structure features a multi-coloured stained glass design and the top will have an observation deck. The design was approved by Frankl's widow, and they began looking for a location to construct it. Their first choice was California, to have it in a Pacific Ocean harbour to complement the Statue of Liberty's position in the Atlantic harbour of New York.

When the approval process in California proved too difficult, the governor of Utah, Spencer Cox, endorsed the project and suggested a location in his state in 2023. Construction has not yet started, and the board overseeing development of the proposed site has not yet approved the project. The proposed design will stand 300 feet tall and is expected to cost $350 million USD, which is being raised through private donations to the Statue of Responsibility Foundation. The design of the site and construction is being led by Utah architecture firm FFKR Architects.
