= Man's Search for Meaning =

1946 book by Viktor Frankl

- Second edition (1947)
- Author: Viktor E. Frankl
- Original title: Ein Psychologe erlebt das Konzentrationslager
- Translator: Ilse Lasch (Part One)
- Language: German
- Genre: Autobiography, psychotherapy
- Publisher: Verlag für Jugend und Volk (Austria); Beacon Press (English)
- Publication date: 1946 (Vienna, Austria); 1959 (United States)
- Publication place: Austria
- Pages: 200
- ISBN: 080701429X
- OCLC: 233687922
- Followed by: The Doctor and the Soul: From Psychotherapy in Logotherapy

Man's Search for Meaning (German: ... trotzdem Ja zum Leben sagen. Ein Psychologe erlebt das Konzentrationslager, lit. '... Saying Yes to Life nonetheless: A Psychologist Experiences the Concentration Camp') is a 1946 book by Viktor Frankl chronicling his experiences as a prisoner in Nazi concentration camps during World War II, and describing his psychotherapeutic method, which involved identifying a purpose to each person's life through one of three ways: the completion of tasks, caring for another person, or finding meaning by facing suffering with dignity.

Frankl observed that among the fellow inmates in the concentration camp, those who survived were able to connect with a purpose in life to feel positive about and who then immersed themselves in imagining that purpose in their own way, such as conversing with an (imagined) loved one. According to Frankl, the way a prisoner imagined the future affected their longevity.

The book intends to answer the question "How was everyday life in a concentration camp reflected in the mind of the average prisoner?" Part One constitutes Frankl's analysis of his experiences in the concentration camps, while Part Two introduces his ideas of meaning and his theory for the link between people's health and their sense of meaning in life. He called this theory logotherapy, and there are now multiple logotherapy institutes around the world.

According to a survey conducted by the Book-of-the-Month Club and the Library of Congress, Man's Search for Meaning belongs to a list of "the ten most influential books in the United States." At the time of the author's death in 1997, the book had sold over 10 million copies and had been translated into 24 languages.

== Editions ==
The book's original title is Ein Psychologe erlebt das Konzentrationslager ("A Psychologist Experiences the Concentration Camp"). Later German editions prefixed the title with Trotzdem Ja zum Leben Sagen ("Nevertheless Saying Yes to Life"), taken from a line in Das Buchenwaldlied, a song written by Friedrich Löhner-Beda while an inmate at Buchenwald. The title of the first English-language translation was From Death-Camp to Existentialism. The book's common full English title is Man's Search for Meaning: An Introduction to Logotherapy, although this subtitle is often not printed on the cover of modern editions.

== Experiences in a concentration camp ==
Frankl identifies three psychological reactions experienced by all inmates to one degree or another:

1. Shock during the initial admission phase to the camp,
2. Apathy after becoming accustomed to camp existence, in which the inmate values only that which helps himself and his friends survive, and
3. Reactions of depersonalization, moral deformity, bitterness, and disillusionment if he survives and is liberated.

Frankl concludes that the meaning of life is found in every moment of living; life never ceases to have meaning, even in suffering and death. In a group therapy session during a mass fast inflicted on the camp's inmates trying to protect an anonymous fellow inmate from fatal retribution by authorities, Frankl offered the thought that for everyone in a dire condition there is someone looking down, a friend, family member, or even God, who would expect not to be disappointed. Frankl concludes from his experience that a prisoner's psychological reactions are not solely the result of the conditions of his life, but also from the freedom of choice he always has even in severe suffering. The inner hold a prisoner has on his spiritual self relies on having a hope in the future, and that once a prisoner loses that hope, he is doomed.

Frankl also concludes that there are only two races of men, decent men and indecent. No society is free of either of them, and thus there were decent Nazi guards and indecent prisoners, most notably the kapo who would torture and abuse their fellow prisoners for personal gain.

His concluding passage in Part One describes the psychological reaction of the inmates to their liberation, which he separates into three stages. The first is depersonalization—a period of readjustment in which a prisoner gradually returns to the world. Initially, the liberated prisoners are so numb that they are unable to understand what freedom means or to emotionally respond to it. Part of them believes that it is an illusion or a dream that will be taken away from them. In their first foray outside their former prison, the prisoners realized that they could not comprehend pleasure. Flowers and the reality of the freedom they had dreamed about for years were all surreal, unable to be grasped in their depersonalization.

The body is the first element to break out of this stage, responding by big appetites of eating and wanting more sleeping. Only after the partial replenishing of the body is the mind finally able to respond, as "feeling suddenly broke through the strange fetters which had restrained it" (p. 111).

This begins the second stage, in which there is a danger of deformation. As the intense pressure on the mind is released, mental health can be endangered. Frankl uses the analogy of a diver suddenly released from his pressure chamber. He recounts the story of a friend who became immediately obsessed with dispensing the same violence in judgment of his abusers that they had inflicted on him.

Upon returning home, the prisoners had to struggle with two fundamental experiences that could damage their mental health: bitterness and disillusionment. The last stage is bitterness at the lack of responsiveness of the world outside—a "superficiality and lack of feeling... so disgusting that one finally felt like creeping into a hole and neither hearing nor seeing human beings any more" (p. 113). Worse was disillusionment, the discovery that suffering does not end, that the longed-for happiness will not come. This was the experience of those who—like Frankl—returned home to discover that no one awaited them. The hope that had sustained them throughout their time in the concentration camp was now gone. Frankl cites this experience as the most difficult to overcome.

As time passed, however, the prisoner's experience in a concentration camp became nothing but a remembered nightmare. What is more, he comes to believe that he has nothing left to fear "except his God" (p. 115).

== Reception ==
In a 1991 survey conducted for the Library of Congress and the Book of the Month Club, Man's Search for Meaning was named one of the 10 most influential books in the US. At the time of Frankl's death in 1997, the book had sold over 10 million copies and had been translated into 24 languages. As of 2022 the book has sold 16 million copies and been printed in 52 languages.

Gordon Allport, who wrote a preface to the book, described it as a "gem of dramatic narrative" which "provides a compelling introduction to the most significant psychological movement of our day". Sarah Bakewell describes it as "an incredibly powerful and moving example of what existentialist thought can actually be for in real life" while Mary Fulbrook praises "the way [Frankl] explores the importance of meaning in life as the key to survival."

However, aspects of the book have garnered criticism. One of Frankl's main ideas in the book is that a positive attitude made one better equipped for surviving the camps. Richard Middleton-Kaplan has said that this implies, whether intentionally or unintentionally, that those who died had given up and that this paved the way for the idea of the Jews going like sheep to the slaughter. Holocaust analyst Lawrence L. Langer criticises Frankl's promotion of logotherapy and says the book has a problematic subtext. He also accuses Frankl of having a tone of self-aggrandizement and a general inhumane sense of studying-detachment towards victims of the Holocaust.

In his book Faith in Freedom, psychiatrist Thomas Szasz states that Frankl's survivor testimony was written to misdirect, and betrays instead an intent of a transparent effort to conceal Frankl's actions and his collaboration with the Nazis, and that, in the assessment of Raul Hilberg, the founder of Holocaust Studies, Frankl's historical account contains distortions akin to Binjamin Wilkomirski's memoirs, which were translated into nine languages before being exposed as deeply problematic (and according to the most radical interpretation false) in Hilberg's 1996 Politics of Memory. Szasz's criticism of Frankl is not universally embraced. Similarly, Hilberg's allegations have been rebutted by several reviewers. Comparison between Frankl's memoirs and Wilkomirski's memoirs leveled by Szasz, however, could legitimately be dismissed altogether as an inapt and misleading analogy insofar as questions arose (and remained) as to whether or not Wilkomirski had ever been an inmate at a concentration camp, whereas this was never a question in Frankl's case: there is no doubt that he is a survivor.

Briefly: Conflicting views about the nature of memory under extreme conditions, as well as the sort of instinctual opportunism (for the sake of survival) or positive thinking mentality that often (one might even say "usually" or "almost always") correlated with long-term survival in the Nazi death camps, makes the memoir an important document of witness during the holocaust but also highlight the way in which it displays the cognitive and psychological limits of representing a situation like the Nazi extermination from an "impartial" first person perspective.

Based on a suggestion in Man's Search for Meaning, a proposed Statue of Responsibility has been designed by Utah sculptor Gary Lee Price and endorsed for construction by the Utah governor. In the book, Frankl makes the following statement about the sculpture:

Freedom, however, is not the last word. Freedom is only part of the story and half of the truth. Freedom is but the negative aspect of the whole phenomenon whose positive aspect is responsibleness. In fact, freedom is in danger of degenerating into mere arbitrariness unless it is lived in terms of responsibleness. That is why I recommend that the Statue of Liberty on the East Coast be supplemented by a Statue of Responsibility on the West Coast.

== See also ==
- Existential anxiety
- Jonathan Livingston Seagull
- Maslow's hierarchy of needs
- Statue of Responsibility – proposed in the book to complement the Statue of Liberty
- Life Is Beautiful (1997), a film on how a positive attitude can be maintained in the worst of circumstances, including a concentration camp
