= St. Thomas Orthodox Syrian Church, Prayagraj =

Malankara Orthodox Syrian Church in Uttar Pradesh, India

St. Thomas Orthodox Syrian Church
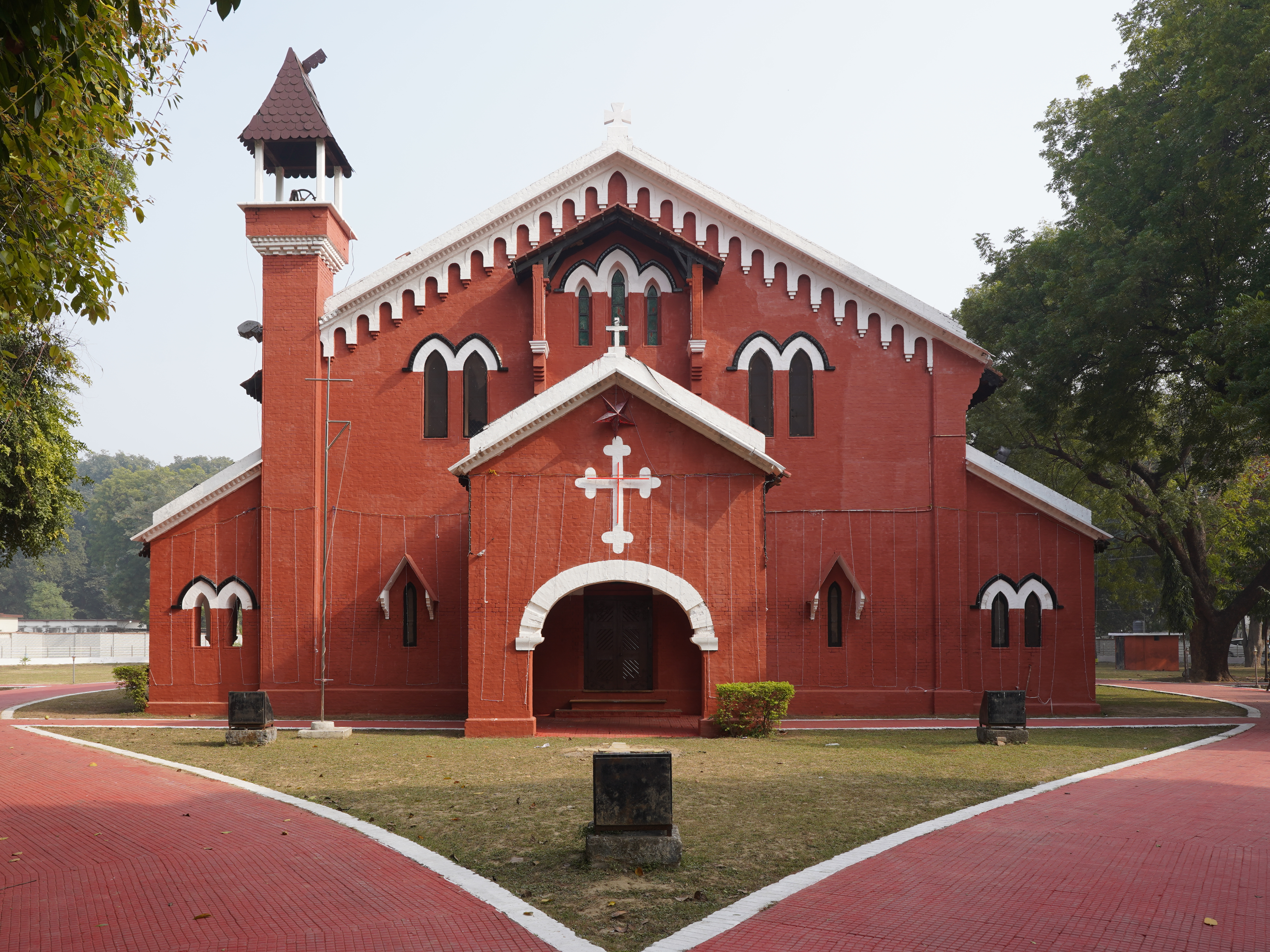
- Front view in 2024
- Country: India
- Language(s): Malayalam and English
- Denomination: Malankara Orthodox Syrian Church
- Website: delhiorthodoxdiocese.com/directory/parish-directory/parishes-in-uttar-pradesh/st-thomas-orthodox-church-allahabad/

History
- Former name: Garrison Church
- Status: Known as St. Thomas Orthodox Syrian Church from 1948 (78 years ago)
- Dedication: Queen Victoria
- Dedicated: 1897 (129 years ago)
- Consecrated: 8 February 1889 (137 years ago)

Architecture
- Functional status: Active

Specifications
- Materials: Wood

Administration
- Diocese: Diocese of Delhi

Clergy
- Vicar: Rev. Fr. Binu B. Thomas

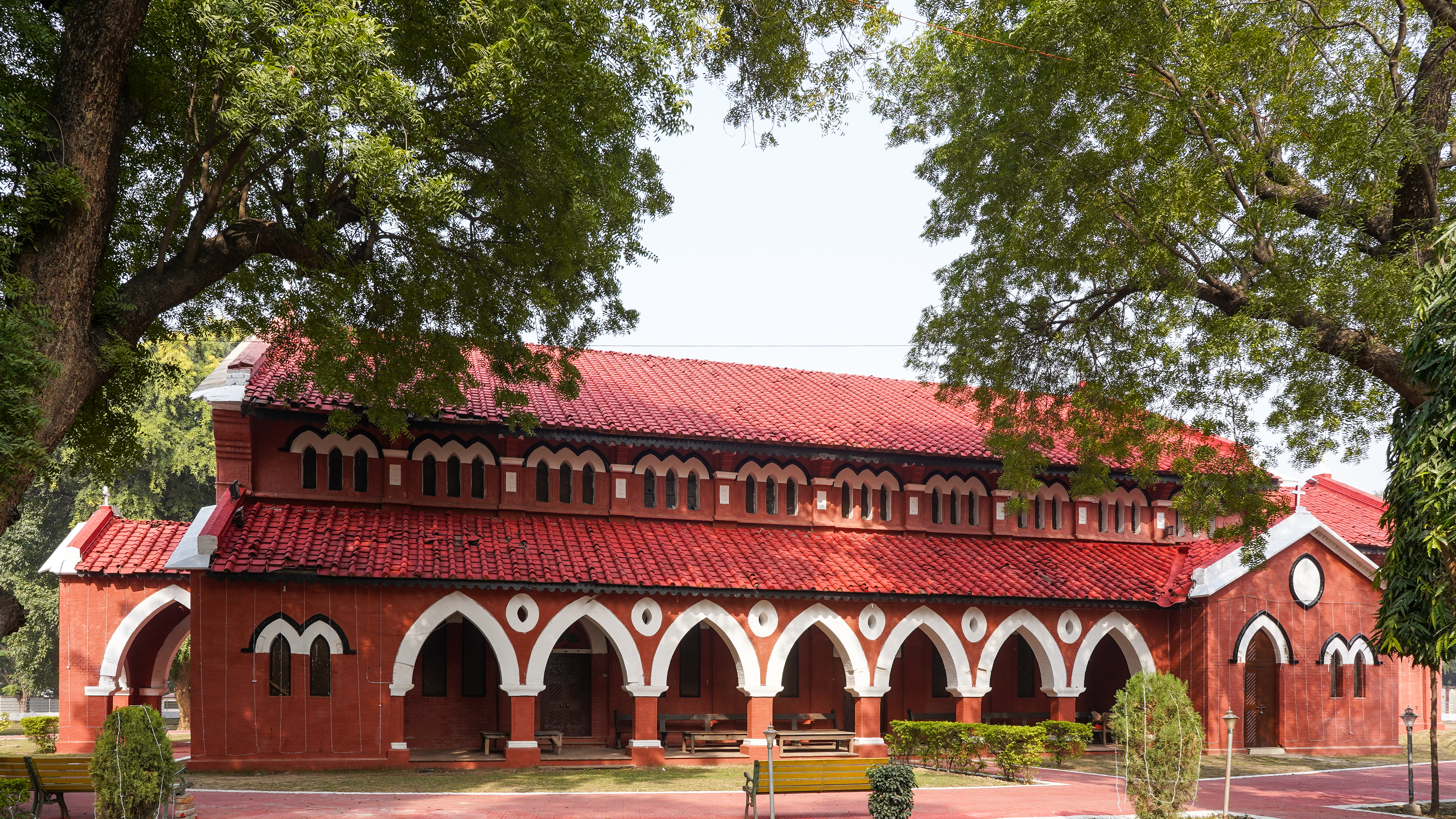
Right (south) facade

St. Thomas Orthodox Syrian Church is located in the Cantonment of Prayagraj (formerly Allahabad) in Uttar Pradesh in north India. The wooden building was completed in 1889 as the Garrison Church. In 1948 it was renamed as the St. Thomas Orthodox Syrian Church. The church is a parish in the Diocese of Delhi, Malankara Orthodox Syrian Church.

== History ==
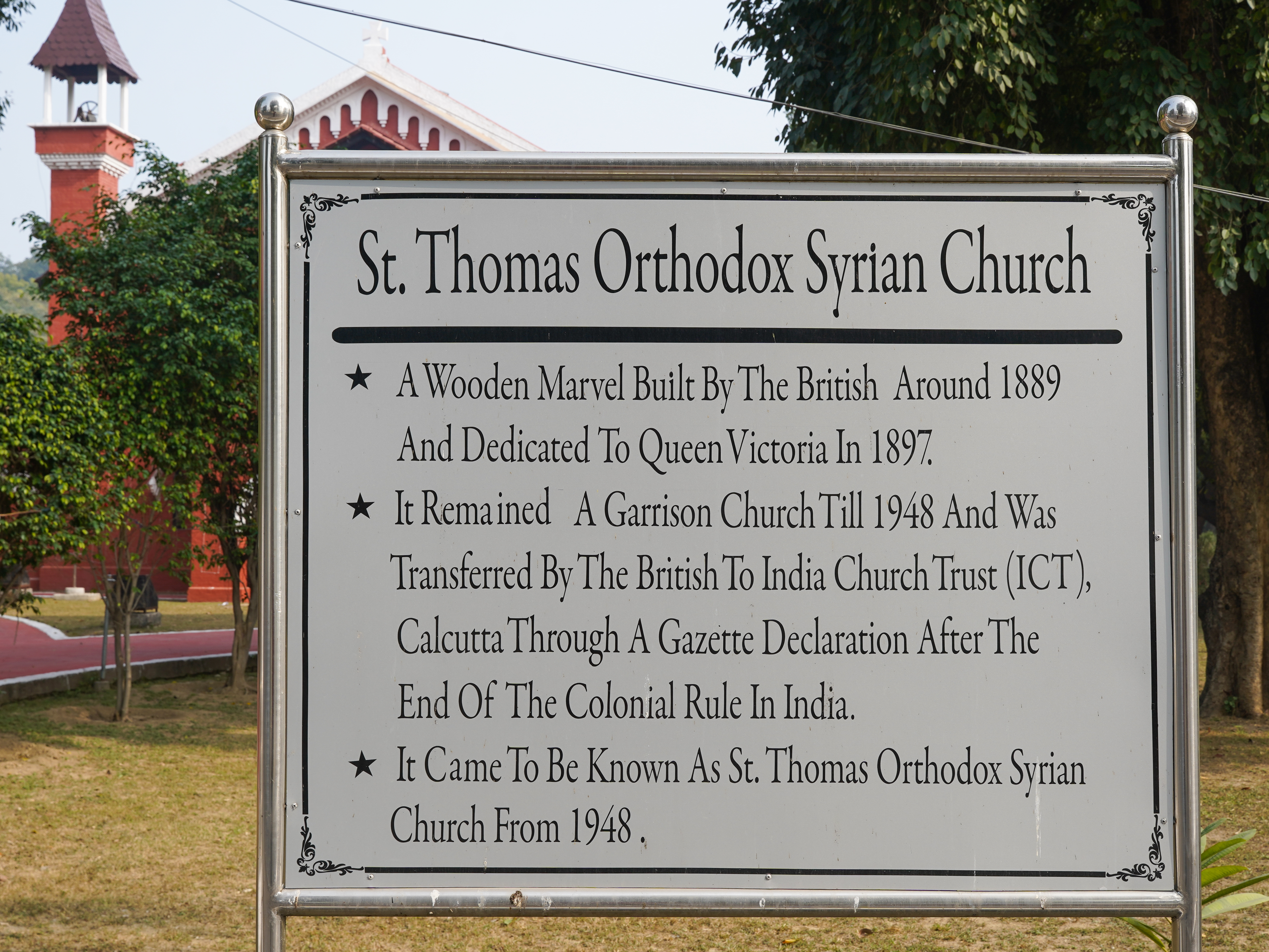
Historic information board

The church was built by Horace Barnet, a military engineer. It was consecrated as the St. David's Garrison Church on 8 February 1889 by the Bishop of Calcutta Ralph Johnson. The church was dedicated to Queen Victoria in 1897. On 1st April 1948, after Indian independence it was transferred to the Indian Church Trustees, Calcutta. Later, it was transferred to the Malankara Syrian Church and given its current name, St. Thomas Orthodox Syrian Church.

== Architecture ==
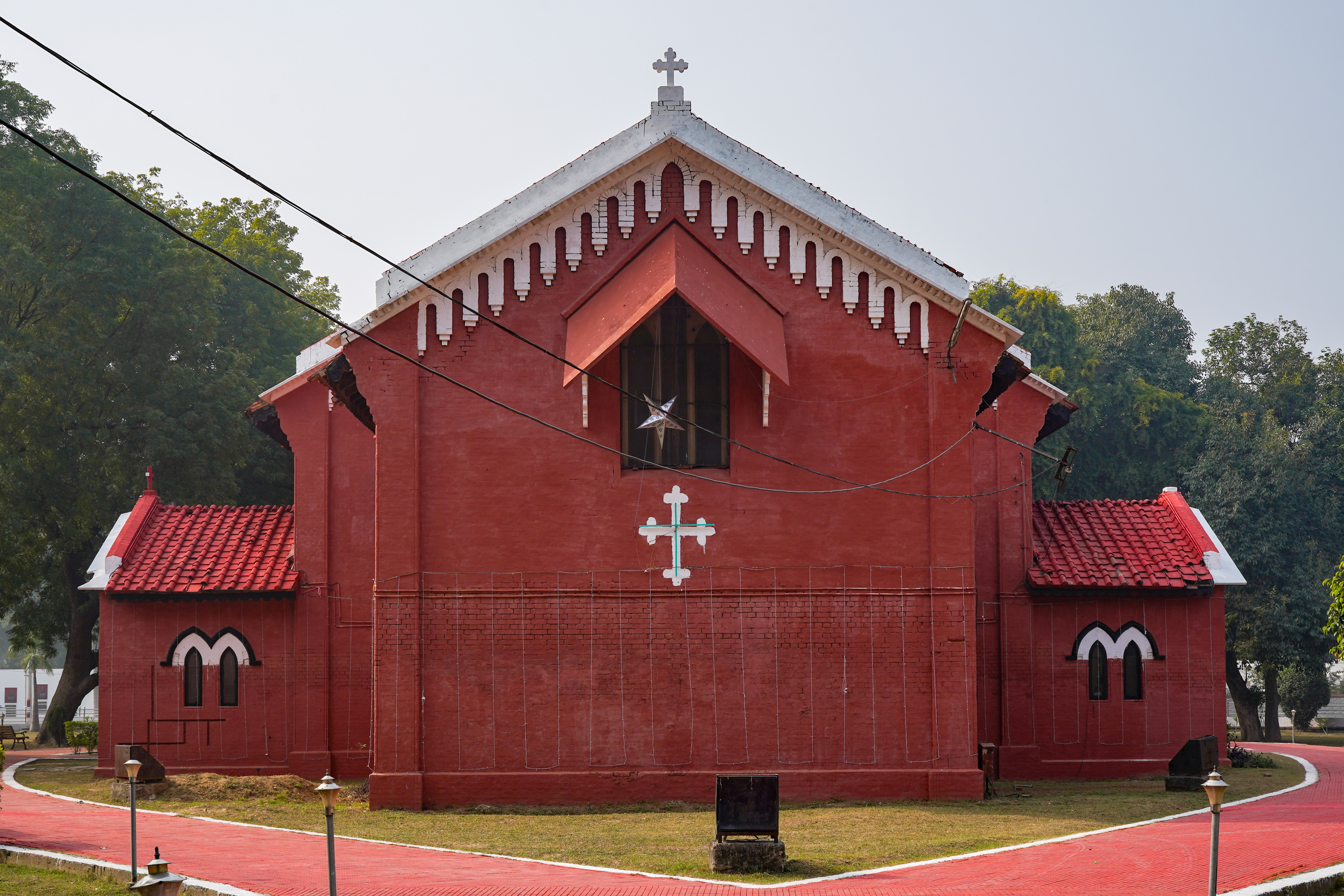
Rear of the church

The church is notable for its unique, entirely wooden construction, which is a rarity among the prominent colonial-era stone and brick religious buildings in Prayagraj. Designed by British military engineer Horace Barnet, the structure is often regarded as a marvel of British military engineering. It was originally erected as a Garrison Church to accommodate the British soldiers stationed in the Allahabad Cantonment. The building features a single spire, a raised wooden foundation, and an east-west orientation typical of traditional colonial church designs.

== Services ==
The parish has several activities for the parishioners.

- Holy Qurbana Eucharistic liturgy services are conducted in Malayalam every Sunday and on feast days
- Prayer services held weekly
- Sunday School
- Martha Mariam Samajam (women's wing)
- Mar Gregorios Orthodox Christian Student Movement (MGOCSM)
- The Orthodox Christian Youth Movement of the East (OCYM)
- Akhila Malankara Orthodox Shusrushaka Sangham (AMOSS)

== See also ==
- All Saints Cathedral, Prayagraj
- St. Joseph's Cathedral, Prayagraj
- Delhi Orthodox Diocese
