= Youhanon Demetrios =

Oriental Orthodox bishop

Dr. Youhanon Mar Demetrios
- Church: Malankara Orthodox Syrian Church
- Diocese: Delhi Diocese
- In office: 2010–present
- Predecessor: Job Mar Philoxenos

Orders
- Ordination: 12 May 2010

Personal details
- Born: 28 May 1964 (age 60)

Youhanon Mar Demetrios (born May 28, 1964), is the Metropolitan of Delhi Diocese of the Malankara Orthodox Syrian Church. He was born to Palamoottil Mathews and Mercy. Home parish is St. Thomas Orthodox Cathedral, Kollam Diocese. He took his Ph.D. - Fordham University and M. R. E - Gorden Conwell Theological Seminary, America

Youhanon Demetrios speaks Malayalam, English, Greek, Hebrew, Amarac, and Syriac.

He took several key positions of the church as Professor, Orthodox Theological Seminary, Kottayam, Secretary, Ecumenical Relations Committee, General Secretary, Orthodox Vydikasangam, Co-Secretary, Orthodox – Catholic Church Dialogue, Delegate, W. C. C Commission of Educational and Ecumenical Formation, Representative of the Church in many international Conferences, Registrar, F.F.R.R.C, Dean, Doctoral Studies.

He was elected as the Metropolitan candidate on 17 February 2010 at the Malankara Association held at Sasthamkotta. He was consecrated as Metropolitan on 12 May 2010 at Mar Elia Cathedral, Kottayam, serving the Delhi Diocese as its Metropolitan.
