= Oskar Pfister Award =

- Awarded for: Outstanding contributions to the understanding of the interrelationships between religion and psychiatry.
- Sponsored by: American Psychiatric Association (APA) and the Association of Professional Chaplains (APC).
- Date: Annually
- Venue: APA Annual Meeting or Institute on Psychiatric Services
- Rewards: \$1,000, plaque, and the Oskar Pfister Award Lecture
- Established: 1983
- First award: 1983
- Latest Recipient: Peter John Verhagen, M.D., Ph.D.

The Oskar Pfister Award was established by the American Psychiatric Association (APA), with the Association of Mental Health Clergy (now the Association of Professional Chaplains), in 1983 to honor those who have made significant contributions to the field of religion and psychiatry. The recipient delivers a lecture at an APA conference during the year of award, although the 2002 lecture was delivered by Susan Larson on behalf of her late husband. The award is named in honor of Oskar Pfister, a chaplain who discussed the religious aspects of psychology with Sigmund Freud.

== Award winners ==
- Source: Association of Professional Chaplains
- 1983 – Jerome D. Frank
- 1984 – Wayne Oates
- 1985 – Viktor Frankl
- 1986 – Hans Küng
- 1987 – Robert Jay Lifton
- 1988 – Oliver Sacks
- 1989 – William W. Meissner
- 1990 – Peter Gay
- 1991 – Robert Coles
- 1992 – Paulos Mar Gregorios
- 1993 – Paul R. Fleischman
- 1994 – James W. Fowler III
- 1995 – Prakash Desai
- 1996 – Ann Belford Ulanov
- 1997 – Ana-Maria Rizzuto
- 1998 – Allen Bergin
- 1999 – Don S. Browning
- 2000 – Paul Ricoeur
- 2001 – Irvin D. Yalom
- 2002 – David Larson
- 2003 – Abraham Twerski
- 2004 – Elizabeth Bowman
- 2005 – Armand Nicholi
- 2006 – Ned H. Cassem
- 2007 – William R. Miller
- 2008 – Dan G. Blazer
- 2009 – Kenneth I. Pargament
- 2010 – George E. Vaillant
- 2011 – Clark S. Aist
- 2012 – Harold G. Koenig
- 2013 – Marc Galanter
- 2014 - C. Robert Cloninger
- 2015 – Allan Josephson
- 2016 - James W. Lomax
- 2017 - James Griffith
- 2018 - John Swinton
- 2019 - George Fitchett
- 2020 - Chris Cook
- 2021 - John Peteet
- 2022 - Tanya Marie Luhrmann
- 2023 - William Gaventa
- 2024 - Peter John Verhagen
- 2025 - Alexander Moreira-Almeida

== See also ==
- List of psychology awards
- List of awards named after people
