= Noogenic neurosis =

Noogenic neurosis is a term in logotherapy denoting a form of neurosis stemming from "existential frustration" (see existential crisis). The term was coined by Dr. Viktor Frankl, the founder of logotherapy.

Noogenic refers to the noetic or spiritual dimension in humans.

== Prevalence ==
Frankl contended that this new type of neurosis increased in the recent years. He estimated that 20% of all neurotic cases were also cases of noogenic neurosis.
