= Paulos Gregorios =

Indian Oriental Orthodox metropolitan

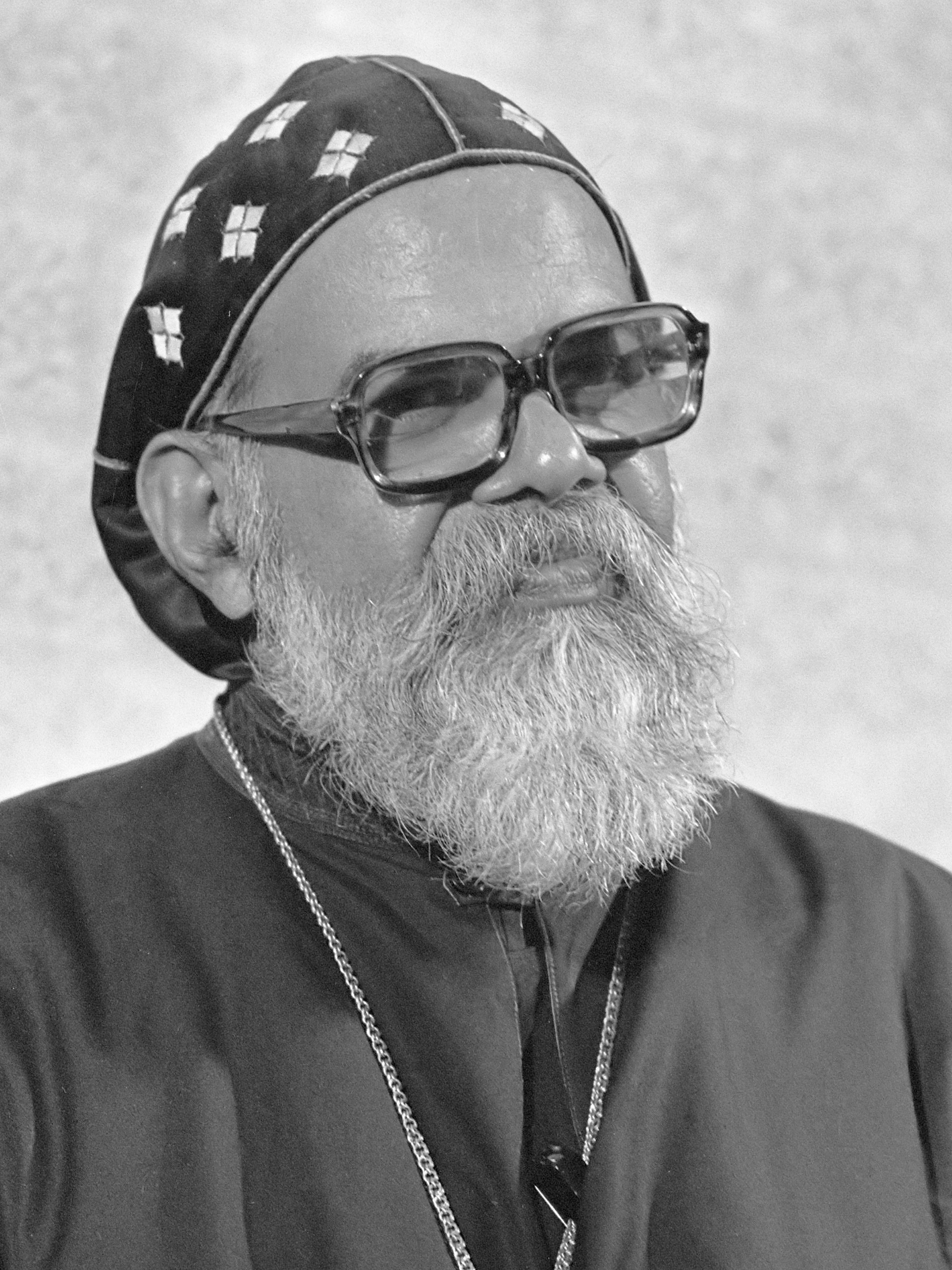
- Gregorios in 1981

Personal details
- Born: Paul Varghese; 9 August 1922 Thrippunithura, Kochi, India
- Died: November 24, 1996 (aged 74)

Paulos Gregorios, born Paul Varghese or Vargīsa Pôla (9 August 1922 – 24 November 1996), was the first metropolitan of the Delhi Diocese of the Malankara Orthodox Syrian Church and served for over two decades.

== Life ==
Varghese was born in Tripunithura to a Christian family called Thadikkal. He started his career as a freelance journalist, contributing articles and reports to various newspapers in Kochi and Malabar. Later, after working with the Cochin Transport Company, he joined the Post & Telegraphs Department in 1942. He then took up a job as a teacher in Ethiopia. He came to the attention of the Emperor of Ethiopia, Haile Selassie I. The relationship that developed between them led Varghese to appointments as the head of various institutions in Ethiopia. He was sent to the United States for higher studies. He received his education there from Goshen College, the University of Oklahoma, Princeton Theological Seminary and Yale. In 1954, he returned to India with a master's degree in theology. He worked as a director of the Fellowship house in Aluva and a visiting professor of Union Christian College Aluva. In 1955, he joined the faculty of the Orthodox Theological Seminary, Kottayam. He also served as the general secretary of the Orthodox Students Christian Movement. During the Ethiopian emperor's visit to India in 1956, Varghese was persuaded to return to Ethiopia. There he served as the emperor's personal aide and advisor.

In 1959, he returned to India and in 1961 he was ordained as a priest. Varghese continued to pursue theological studies. He did his doctoral studies in Oxford and Germany and received his Doctorate in Theology from Serampore College in Calcutta.

In 1975, Varghese was elevated as a bishop with the name of Paulos Mar Gregorios. He took charge of the newly formed Diocese of Delhi, a position he held until his death. He established the Delhi Orthodox Centre, where he began such ambitious projects as the Neeti Shanti Kendra for promoting peace and justice, and Sarva Dharma Nilaya for inter-religious dialogue and cooperation.

Concurrently, Gregorios was the principal of the Orthodox Theological Seminary at Kottayam, a teaching and training institution for the priests of the church. He raised it to a college recognized for the awarding of graduate and postgraduate degrees. He established the Sophia Centre linked to the seminary.

He held various positions in the World Council of Churches (WCC). There he headed the Division of Ecumenical Action as an associate general secretary. Later, he was a member of the central committee and of the executive committee, moderator of the Commission on Church and Society (1975–83), and one of its presidents (1983–91). He led WCC delegations to major conferences including the UN General Assembly Special Sessions on Disarmament (1983,1988). In WCC forums and beyond, he persistently opposed apartheid and the old and new colonialism. He chaired the World Conference on Faith, Science and the Future in Cambridge, United States (1979). He was the vice-president of the Christian Peace Conference (1970–90).

A member of the senate of the Kerala and Serampore universities for a number of years, Gregorios was a visiting professor at Denver, Harvard, Wooster, and Princeton Theological Seminary. He was a fellow at the Indian Institute of Advanced Study at Shimla, the vice-president of the Kerala philosophical Congress, and the president of the Indian Philosophical Congress.

== Selected works ==
- The Joy of Freedom: Eastern Worship and Modern Man, London, Lutterworth P., (1967)
- The Freedom of Man; an Inquiry Into Some Roots of the Tension Between Freedom and Authority in Our Society, Westminster Press (1972) ISBN 0-664-20928-9
- The St. Thomas Christian Encyclopaedia of India Editorial Board Member, Vol.2, 1973; v.1 1982; v.3 2009. Ch. Ed. George Menachery Trichur and Ollur (OCLC 73 - 905568)
- Freedom and Authority, Madras, Christian Literature Society, (1974)
- The Human Presence: an Orthodox View of Nature, Geneva, World Council of Churches, (c1978) ISBN 2-8254-0575-2
- Truth Without Tradition: Special Lectures, Tirupati, Sri Venkateswara University, (c1978)
- Science for Sane Societies, Paragon House, (c1987) ISBN 0-913757-70-5
- Cosmic Man : the Divine Presence : the Theology of St. Gregory of Nyssa, Paragon House, (1988) ISBN 0-913757-91-8
- The Meaning and Nature of Diakonia, WCC Publications, (c1988) ISBN 2-8254-0926-X
- Enlightenment, East & West: Pointers in the Quest for India’s Secular Identity, Indian Institute of Advance Study in association with B.R. Pub. Corp. (1989) ISBN 81-7018-560-2
- 'A light too Bright - An Assessment of the values of European Enlightenment'
- A Human God, Kottayam, MGF Publications (1992)
- Love's Freedom: The Grand Mystery, Kottayam, MGF Publications, (1997)
- Science, technology, and the future of humanity, Kottayam, MGF Publications, (2007)

== Awards ==
Certificate of Merit for Distinguished Service and Inspired Leadership of the World Church, Cambridge (UK); Order of St.Vladimir (USSR); Order of St.Sergius, First Rank (USSR); Order of St.Mary Magdalene (Poland); "Doctor of Theology" - Leningrad Theological Academy (USSR); "Doctor of Theology" - Lutheran Theological Academy (Budapest); "Doctor of Theology"- Jan Hus Faculty (Prague); "Doctor of Theology (h.c.)" - Orthodox Faculty (Czechoslovakia); The International Biographical Roll of Honour for Distinguished Service to World Unity and Understanding Among Religions (USA); Distinguished Leadership Award for Extraordinary Service, Peace and Unity (USA); Hall of Fame Award for Extraordinary Services to Peace and Unity (USA); Hidalgo de San Antonio de Bejar (Texas, USA); Otto Nuschke Prize for Peace (GDR); Soviet Land Nehru Award (India); "Man of the Year Award", Bhai Param Vir Singh International Award (India); Golden Academy Award for Lifetime Achievement (USA); Kerala Sahitya Akademi Award for Scholarly Literature (India); Eminent Ecumenical Educator Award (India); Acharya Award (India); Distinguished Alumnus Award, Princeton Theological Seminary (USA); Oskar Pfister Award, American Psychiatric Association (USA); Social Services Award, Goshen College (USA).

== See also ==
- Mar Gregorios Orthodox Church Janakpuri

K.M. Seethi, "Paulos Mar Gregorios: Doyan of Peace and Freedom," Global South Colloquy, 9 August 2022 https://globalsouthcolloquy.com/paulos-mar-gregorios-a-doyen-of-peace-and-freedom/
