= Paradoxical intention =

Psychotherapeutic method

Paradoxical intention (PI) is a psychotherapeutic technique used to treat recursive anxiety by repeatedly rehearsing the anxiety-inducing pattern of thought or behaviour, often with exaggeration and humor. Paradoxical intention has been shown to be effective in treating psychosomatic illnesses such as chronic insomnia, public speaking phobias, etc. by making patients do the opposite of their hyper-intended goal, hindering their ability to perform the activity.

== The term ==
Dr. Viktor Frankl, the founder of Logotherapy, coined the term in 1939 and advocated for its use by patients with severe anxiety disorders. Though therapists had been utilizing paradoxical treatments for a long time before the term was coined. Later on paradoxical intention was incorporated into Logotherapy.

== Technique ==
Within the framework of Logotherapy, two techniques have been developed: 'paradoxical intention' and 'dereflection.'

Most anxious behaviours are a result of performance anxiety due to the inability to perform an action, leading to a vicious circle of anticipatory anxiety. Paradoxical intention teaches the patient to distance themselves from the action, gain control over it and eventually, bring about its removal. It attempts to break this circle by replacing the pathogenic fear with a paradoxical wish. Furthermore, by learning to appreciate the humour in their exaggerated responses, individuals observe the non-catastrophic consequences of their fear-inducing stimuli first-hand, accepting the unlikelihood of the feared anxiety-producing outcome occurring. Paradoxical intention is mainly employed to combat discomfort associated with internal causes while fear of external stimuli can still be treated through conventional treatments such as systematic desensitisation, cognitive behavioural therapy, etc. For example, if the patient has a fear of public speaking, paradoxical intention would be employed only if the feelings of apprehension stem from an internal source, e.g. having an increased heart rate leading to a heart attack and not due to external factors such as the size of the crowd, their judgement, etc. In this case, the therapist would prescribe the individual to present to the public while focusing on the most salient aspect of their fear – in this case, trying to increase heart rate.

=== For phobic and obsessive compulsion ===
The patient is encouraged to do, or to wish to happen, the very things he fears (the former applying to the phobic patient, the latter to the obsessive-compulsive)

— Viktor Frankl, Paradoxical intention and dereflection,

=== For insomnia ===
Paradoxical intention has been shown as an effective therapy in the treatment of chronic insomnia. It attempts to eradicate the anxiety associated with the inability to sleep by instructing patients to do the opposite and attempt to stay awake. By asking patients to keep their eyes open, while lying comfortably in a dark room without sleeping, they are taught to understand the non-disastrous implications of staying awake and thus, the anxiety associated with it diminishes. Thereby in this manner, by eliminating voluntary sleep effort, paradoxical intention minimises sleep performance anxiety, promoting rapid sleep onset. Similarly, it is also suggested that by diverting attention from sleep performance, it allows for cognitive de-arousal leading to relaxation and sleep.

A study investigating the effects of paradoxical intention on sleep effort, sleep anxiety and objective and subjective sleep showed that relative to control conditions, participants allocated to PI displayed noteworthy reductions in sleep effort and sleep performance anxiety. It has also been found that subjectively measured sleep onset latency [SOL] (time taken to fall asleep) is significantly lower in the PI conditions, with SOL change amongst PI participants being strongly associated with sleep effort change. This shows that sleep effort and sleep anxiety are integral mechanisms overridden by PI to achieve normal sleep functions. A 1984 study analysing cases of paradoxical intention as a treatment showed that PI rapidly reduced SOLs and was also successful at maintaining sleep onset and maximising total sleep time.

A 2021 meta-analysis conducted a systematic review of randomised control trials and experimental studies comparing PI for insomnia to passive and active comparators. Results showed that relative to passive comparators, PI showed radical improvements in several key insomnia symptoms with moderate improvements as compared to active comparators. It also promoted decreased sleep-related performance anxiety. Additionally, a 2018 meta-analysis contrasted cognitive and behavioural interventions with passive comparators and when compared to recent relations between PI and passive comparators, it is found that the effects of PI on SOL are larger.

=== Recursive anxiety ===
Research has also configured links between the effectiveness of paradoxical intention as a treatment towards recursive anxiety. Patients whose phobias originate from recursive anxiety have shown greater improvement with PI related treatments. This occurs due to paradoxical intention overcoming performance anxiety and facilitating natural sleep, unlike situations where external factors e.g. noise, temperature, etc. affect sleeping ability. Recursive anxiety is also a result of the anticipatory fear that anxiety causes a lack of self-control leading to public embarrassment and judgement. Therefore, recursive anxiety leads to individuals attempting to control their cognitive environment by adjusting thoughts and behaviour to minimize stimuli inhibiting calmness.

== Dereflection ==
Dereflection is the technique of diverting the client's attention away from their symptoms, as hyper-reflection can lead to inaction.

Dereflection has been developed for people with sexual disorders, in which the patient's desire for sexual pleasure becomes an obstruction to achieving it. The therapist discourages intercourse and breaks the cycle of desire, striving, and disappointment.

== Criticisms ==
=== Relative effectiveness ===
The effectiveness of paradoxical intention as a substantial treatment for insomnia has been challenged. In fact, research indicates that stimulus control therapies and sleep restriction therapies have been proven to be more effective in treating insomnia.

The current understanding of paradoxical intention with regards to sleep states that it alleviates the patient's “effort associated with sleep”. Espie and Lindsay argue that instead of eradicating the anxiety, it may simply be redirected towards the “effort to stay awake”. Espie says that since the objective of sleep therapy is to view sleep as an involuntary physiological process that occurs passively, trying to put it under voluntary control by instructing patients to deliberately stay awake could be counterintuitive.

=== Lack of reliable and objective research ===
Turner and Ascher say that paradoxical intention has not gained complete acceptance in behaviour therapy because the research supporting its clinical efficacy is mainly limited to uncontrolled case studies.

Some have argued that studies have also shown a lack of evidence directly gleaned from the clients in order to explain the effectiveness of PI approaches, rendering the data unreliable, and that the insomniac self-reports are unreliable as participants may provide socially desirable answers.

Thereby, paradoxical intention is viewed as a last case resort in the event of the ineffectiveness of other relaxation-desensitisation programs.

== See also ==
- Kavka's toxin puzzle
