= Gary Lee Price =

American sculptor (born 1955)

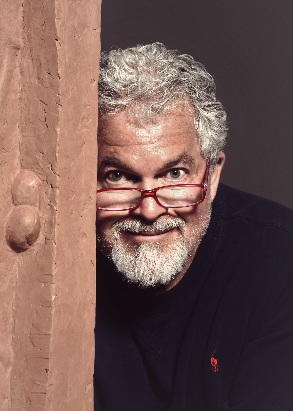
Gary Lee Price

Gary Lee Price (born May 2, 1955) is an American sculptor.

== Biography ==
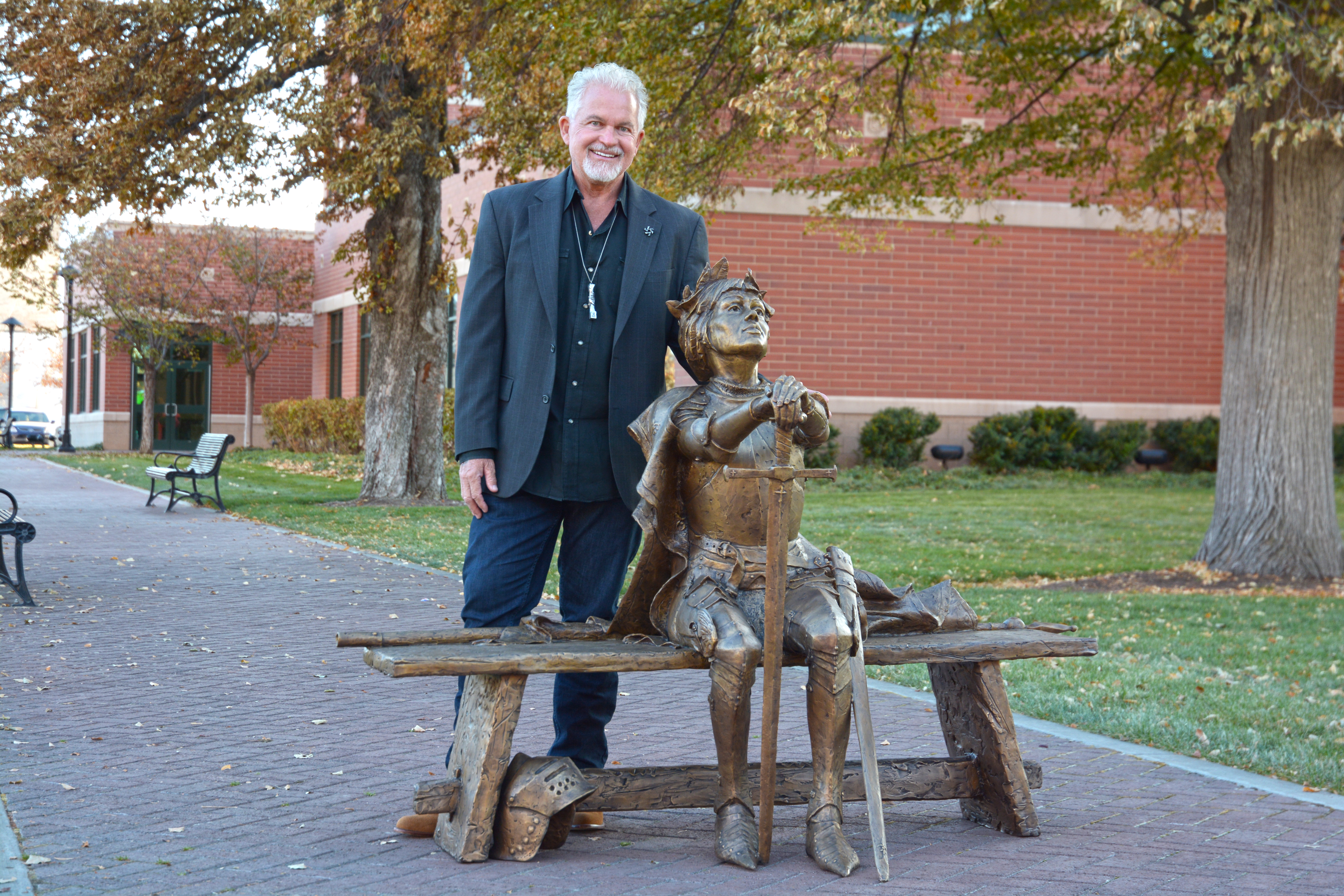
Price with his sculpture of Joan of Arc, part of his Great Contributors Bench Series

At the age of 6 years old Gary Lee Price witnessed the murder-suicide of his mother, Betty Jo Reeder, and his step-father, Ted Reeder in Manheim, Germany. He was shipped back to the states to be raised by his mom's first husband, Wayne Price. Price went to both grade school and high school in Montpelier, Idaho. After graduating from Montpelier High School, he went on to study at Ricks College in Rexburg, Idaho. He then served a two-year mission for the Church of Jesus Christ of Latter-day Saints in southern Germany. Following his mission, Price studied in Jerusalem for six months through Brigham Young University’s Study Abroad program. He then studied at the Utah Technical College in Orem, Utah (now Utah Valley University), where he met and studied with sculptor Stan Johnson. With Johnson's encouragement, Price decided to continue his education at the University of Utah where he graduated with a BA in Art. His professional sculpting career took off almost immediately with the sales of his early Western and Native American pieces, including Sacred Meat and Ascent. Price credits the piece Ascent as the inspiration for his "Statue of Responsibility". Stephen R. Covey was instrumental in introducing Gary Lee Price to the Statue of Responsibility. Dr Covey was a friend and colleague of holocaust survivor, Viktor E. Frankl, author of Man's Search for Meaning, Covey made a commitment to Frankl to make sure that Frankl's vision of a Statue of Responsibility on the West coast would one day "bookend" the Statue of Liberty on the East coast. Price holds the trademarks and copyrights, and is the official sculptor for this project. Price and his wife, Leesa Clark-Price have created a non-profit organization, Statue of Responsibility Foundation which is currently in the third phase of this endeavor. Price's memoirs, a book titled Divine Turbulence: Navigating the Amorphous Winds of Life, were released in 2022.

== Career ==
Photo of sculpture called The Book Worm, sculpted by Price, and photographed outside of the Doylestown Branch of Bucks County Free Library in 2025.

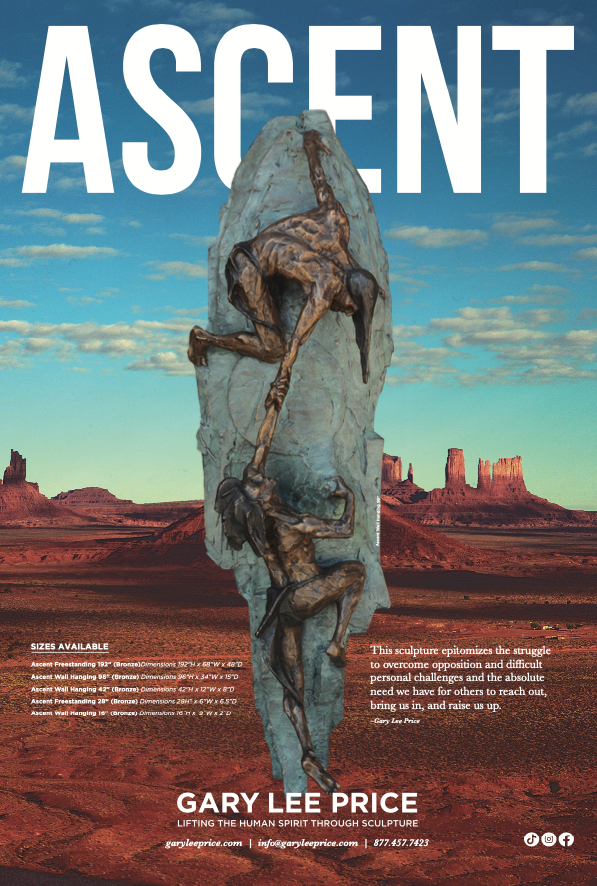
Photo of Price’s sculpture called They Rise Highest Who Lift As They Go, also known as Ascent

After leaving Utah Valley University, Price enrolled at the University of Utah to study painting, drawing, and anatomy. He studied under Alvin Gittins as well as Stan Johnson. In 1982, he earned his B.F.A in painting and drawing. During his high-school years, Price painted and sold his landscape paintings. Later on, he worked as a ranch hand, a farmer, a jewelry salesperson and manager, and worked in Stan Johnson’s studio and foundry in Mapleton, Utah. Price gained many skills through his work including mold making, wax and slurry casting, and welding. These skills would later become very important in influencing the direction of his art. Some of his earliest subjects include Southwestern and wildlife themes, such as Buffalo Nickel and Return of Fury. His first recognition came with the Death Valley Art Show, followed by recognition for his sculpture They Rise Highest Who Lift As They Go, also known as Ascent.

In 1991, Gary Lee Price was elected a member of the National Sculpture Society. In November 2001, he received the "Governor's Mansion Artist Award," from Governor Michael Leavitt of Utah, for his support of the arts. Aside from his sculpture images appearing on the covers of a few various magazines and books, the December 2003 issue of Utah Valley Magazine featured a cover story on Gary and his career entitled, "The Spirit of Giving." In 2005, it was announced that he had been selected to create the 305-foot Statue of Responsibility on the west coast of the United States. Price is currently in Phase III of this history making project. In 2014 Gary was elected by his National Sculpture Society peers to the status of Fellow.
