= Ann Belford Ulanov =

American psychoanalyst and academic

Ann Belford Ulanov (born January 1, 1938) is an American academic and Jungian psychoanalyst. She is the Christiane Brooks Johnson Memorial Professor Emerita of Psychiatry and Religion at Union Theological Seminary in New York City. She maintains a private practice as a Jungian analyst.

== Early life and education ==
Ulanov was born on January 1, 1938, in Princeton, New Jersey. Her father, Ralph J. Belford, was a surgeon, and her mother, Ruth Belford, worked as a nurse prior to her marriage.

She earned a B.A. degree cum laude from Radcliffe College in 1959. Between 1957 and 1959, she participated in private study with theologian Paul Tillich. She completed an M.Div. magna cum laude in 1962 and a Th.D. in psychiatry and religion in 1967, both at Union Theological Seminary. She completed a pastoral psychotherapy residency at the Blanton-Peale Graduate Institute of Religion and Health from 1962 to 1965, and graduated as a Certified Jungian Analyst from the C.G. Jung Training Center in New York City, where she trained from 1963 to 1967.

== Career ==
Ulanov established a private psychoanalytic practice in New York City in 1965. She joined the faculty of Union Theological Seminary in 1966 as an instructor in the Department of Psychiatry and Religion. She became an assistant professor in 1967, associate professor in 1971, and full professor in 1974. She was appointed as the Christiane Brooks Johnson Memorial Professor of Psychiatry and Religion in 1987, and directed the Psychiatry and Religion program for over two decades before retiring in 2014. She is an Episcopalian.

Her teaching and research cover prayer, aggression, anxiety, identity, and the feminine from a Jungian perspective.

Ulanov married English professor and writer Barry Ulanov in 1968. They co-authored six books on religion and depth psychology before his death in 2000. She has authored 14 books independently.

== Awards and honors ==
The American Psychiatric Association awarded Ulanov the Oskar Pfister Award for religion and psychology in 1996. The National Association for the Advancement of Psychoanalysis gave her the Gradiva Award for her book Finding Space: Winnicott, God, and Psychic Reality. She received the Sapientia et Doctrina award from Fordham University and holds honorary doctorates from Virginia Theological Seminary, Loyola University Maryland, and Christian Theological Seminary.

== Selected works ==
Ulanov is the author of 14 books and the co-author of 6 books.

- The Feminine in Jungian Psychology and in Christian Theology (1971)
- Receiving Woman: Studies in the Psychology and Theology of the Feminine
- Picturing God; The Wisdom of the Psyche; The Female Ancestors of Christ
- The Wizards' Gate
- The Functioning Transcendent
- Religion and the Spiritual in Carl Jung
- Finding Space: Winnicott, God, and Psychic Reality
- Attacked by Poison Ivy, A Psychological Study
- Spiritual Aspects of Clinical Work (2004)
- The Unshuttered Heart: Opening to Aliveness/Deadness in the Self
- Creativity and Madness (2013)
- Knots and Their Untying: Essays on Psychological Dilemmas (2014)

=== With Barry Ulanov ===
- Religion and the Unconscious (1975)
- Primary Speech: A Psychology of Prayer (1988)
- Cinderella and Her Sisters: The Envied and Envying (1983)
- The Witch and The Clown: Two Archetypes of Human Sexuality
- The Healing Imagination
- Transforming Sexuality: The Archetypal World of Anima and Animus
