= David Larson =

David Larson may refer to:

- David Larson (swimmer) (born 1959), former competition swimmer
- David Larson (Paralympian), American Paralympic athlete
- David Larson (poker player), amateur poker player, winner of the WPT Rolling Thunder (2018)

== See also ==
- David Larsen (born 1980), American actor
