= Dan Blazer =

American psychiatrist

Daniel German Blazer (born February 23, 1944, in Nashville, Tennessee) is the J.P. Gibbons Professor of Psychiatry Emeritus at Duke University School of Medicine.

== Education ==
After graduating from Cohn High School in 1962, Blazer received his bachelor's degree from Vanderbilt University in 1965. He later received his MD from the University of Tennessee College of Medicine in 1969 and his MPH and PhD in epidemiology from the University of North Carolina at Chapel Hill in 1979 and 1980, respectively.

== Career ==
Blazer joined Duke in 1976 as an assistant professor of psychiatry, where he became an associate professor in 1980 and a full professor in 1985. He became an adjunct professor of epidemiology at the UNC Gillings School of Global Public Health in 1986, and a professor of community and family medicine there in 1988. He became the J.P. Gibbons Professor of Psychiatry at Duke University School of Medicine in 1990. He has served on three Institute of Medicine boards, and was the chair of two of them. He has also been a member and the chair of the Institute of Medicine's Membership Committee.

== Research ==
Blazer is known for researching the epidemiology of depression, substance use disorders, and the occurrence of suicide among the elderly. He has also researched the differences in the rate of substance use disorders among races.

== Honors and awards ==
Blazer was elected into the Institute of Medicine in 1995, and received their Distinguished Service Medal in 2014. He has also received the Distinguished Alumni Award at the University of North Carolina School of Public Health in 1989, the Rema LaPouse Award from the American Public Health Association in 2001, the First Annual Geriatric Psychiatry Research Award from the American College of Psychiatrists in 2004, the Kleemeier Award from the Gerontological Society of America, the Distinguished Faculty Award from Duke Medical School in 2005, and the Oskar Pfister Award for the integration of religion and psychiatry from the American Psychiatric Association in 2008.
