= The Doctor and the Soul =

1946 book by Viktor Frankl

- First edition (German)
- Author: Viktor E. Frankl
- Original title: Ärztliche Seelsorge
- Translator: Richard and Clara Winston
- Cover artist: Matt Mahurin
- Language: English
- Genre: Psychology, logotherapy
- Publisher: Franz Deuticke (Austrian); Knopf (English)
- Publication date: 1946 (Vienna, Austria); 1955 (United States)
- Pages: 318
- ISBN: 0394743172
- Preceded by: Man's Search for Meaning
- Followed by: The Unconscious God

The Doctor and the Soul (German: Ärztliche Seelsorge; subtitled From Psychotherapy to Logotherapy in English translations) is a 1946 book by Viktor E. Frankl, the Viennese psychiatrist and founder of logotherapy.

The book explores topics on the meaning of life in general as well as the meaning of specific areas of one's life, such as work and personal relationships.

Frankl took the original manuscript of the book with him into the Nazi concentration camps where he was held. However, it was soon discarded by other inmates. Frankl later reconstructed the manuscript from memory while still in the concentration camps, and published after the end of World War II.

== Contents ==
The Doctor and the Soul is divided into five sections:

- From Psychotherapy to Logotherapy
- From Psychoanalysis to Existential Analysis
- Logotherapy as a Psychotherapeutic Technique
- From Secular Confession to Medical Ministry
- Psychotherapy on Its Way to Rehumanization

== Writing ==
Frankl wrote the book initially during Nazi occupation of Austria. However, he was not able to publish at that time. Instead, he was forced to hide his manuscript and take it with him to the concentration camps. Soon after arriving at the concentration camp, Frankl was forced to discard his work.

A few years later, while still incarcerated, Frankl began reconstructing the manuscript from memory on scraps of paper. Sometime after his release, after the war had ended, Frankl published both Man's Search for Meaning as well as The Doctor and the Soul.

Frankl attributed his survival during the war years to his awareness of the topics written in The Doctor and the Soul. He countered the image of him as portrayed in the American media, that he discovered these ideas in the concentration camps. Instead, said Frankl, discovering these ideas prior to his arrest and detainment helped him overcome the existential crises of losing everything dear to him.
