= Joseph Fabry =

Joseph B. Fabry (November 6, 1909 – May 7, 1999) was an Austrian-American writer associated with the logotherapy movement.

== Background ==
Fabry was born in 1909 and earned his doctorate from the University of Vienna. Being Jewish, he had attempted to flee from the Nazis, but was arrested and held in the Merxplas detention camp in Belgium. After the Second World War, he migrated to the United States, eventually moving to Berkeley where he became an editor for the University of California Press. He met Viktor Frankl in 1965 and developed a lifelong friendship with him. Fabry became involved in the logotherapy movement, writing and editing a number of works, as well as organizing conferences. He also helped to found the Viktor Frank Institute of Logotherapy in California.

== Books ==
- The Pursuit of Meaning: Logotherapy Applied to Life (1968)
- Guideposts to Meaning: Discovering What Really Matters (1988)
- The Calls of Meaning (1998)
