= Fabry =

Fabry or Fábry is a surname related to the occupation of blacksmith. Notable people with the surname include:

- Branislav Fábry (born 1985), Slovak ice hockey player
- Charles Fabry, French physicist, co-inventor of the Fabry-Pérot etalon
- Emile Fabry (1865–1966), Belgian artist and painter
- Eugène Fabry (1856-1944), French mathematician who studied the singularities of analytic functions
- Jean Fabry (1876-1968), French politician
- Johannes Fabry, German dermatologist who provided the first description of Fabry disease
- Joseph Fabry, author and editor of logotherapy
- Pál Fábry, Hungarian politician and journalist
- Sándor Fábry, Hungarian showman

Fictional characters:

- Fabry, Chief Engineer at Rossum's Universal Robots in the play R.U.R.

== See also ==
- Fabry disease - a genetic disorder that can affect the kidneys, heart, and skin caused by a deficiency in the enzyme alpha-galactosidase
