= Delhi Orthodox Diocese =

Diocese of the Malankara Orthodox Syrian Church

Diocese of Delhi

Orthodox
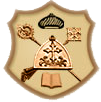
- Catholicate Emblem

Location
- Country: India
- Territory: Delhi
- Metropolitan: H. G. Youhanon Mar Demetrios
- Headquarters: Delhi Orthodox Centre 2, Institutional Area Tughlakabad, New Delhi 110 062

Information
- First holder: Paulos Mar Gregorios
- Rite: Malankara Rite
- Established: 1975
- Diocese: Delhi Diocese
- Parent church: Malankara Orthodox Syrian Church

Website
- Delhi Diocese

The Diocese of Delhi is one of the 32 dioceses of the Malankara Orthodox Syrian Church.

== History ==
The episcopal synod of the Malankara Orthodox Syrian Church created the Delhi Diocese in the year 1975, by carving it out of the erstwhile Outside Kerala Diocese. The newly created diocese was headed by Dr. Paulos Mar Gregorios.

== Timeline ==
- 1942 – A congregation is formed and liturgical worship started by Fr. Mathews (later Catholicos Baselios Mar Thoma Mathews II)
- 1944 – Metropolitan Alexios Mar Theodosios of Kollam and the "Diocese outside Kerala" visits Delhi to explore the feasibility of building an Orthodox Church in Delhi.
- 1952 – During the second visit of Mar Theodosios, the congregation decided to take steps to construct a church of their own. The Delhi parish is formally launched and Fr. K.C Thomas (later the Metropolitan of Canada, U.K, and Europe Diocese, Thomas Mar Makarios) is appointed as the first resident Vicar of the parish of Delhi.
- 1961 – The Delhi Orthodox Syrian Church Society is registered with the threefold aim of establishing a place of worship for the parish, an educational institution, and a healthcare facility to the public.
- 1964 – The Foundation stone of the St. Mary's Church (later Cathedral) at Hauz Khas, is laid by the Patriarch of Antioch, Ignatius Jacob III with the participation of the Diocesan Metropolitan Mathews Mar Athanasios (later Catholicos Baselios Mar Thoma Mathews I).
- 1968 – The St. Mary's Church is consecrated by the Diocesan Metropolitan, Mathews Mar Athanasios.
- 1975 – The Holy Synod establishes the new Diocese of Delhi.
- 1976 – Paulos Mar Gregorios takes charge as the Metropolitan of Delhi.
- 1981 – Foundation stone of the Delhi Orthodox Center is laid by Paulos Mar Gregorios, the Metropolitan of the Diocese.
- 1984 – The Delhi Orthodox Centre is dedicated by the Catholicos, Baselios Mar Thoma Mathews I and is inaugurated by the Vice President of India, R. Venkataraman.
- 1991 – Job Mar Philoxenos joins the Diocese as the Assistant Metropolitan.
- 1996 – Paulose Mar Gregorios Metropolitan dies.
- 2002 – Job Mar Philoxenos is consecrated as the Metropolitan on 26 December.
- 2011 – Job Mar Philoxenos Metropolitan dies on 20 November.
- 2012 – Youhanon Mar Demetrios is consecrated as new Metropolitan of the Delhi Diocese on 7 October 2012
- 2019 – The Renovated Delhi Orthodox Centre is consecrated by Baselios Mar Thoma Paulose II on 26–27 July 2019

== Diocesan Metropolitan ==
- Paulos Mar Gregorios (1976–1996)
- Job Mar Philoxenos (1996–2011)
- Youhanon Mar Demetrios (2011 – present)

== The Diocese today ==
Once the nucleus of the Orthodox Church in North India was formed in the capital of the country, the growth of parishes in adjacent centres was rapid and the establishment of the Diocese of Delhi followed in a few years. Outside Delhi, there are several parishes spread across the various States at Ambala, Alwar, Gurgaon, Kherti Nagar, Bharatpur, Gwalior, Jhansi, Dholpur, Agra, Dehradun, Hardwar, Bhatinda, Hanumangarh, Chandigarh, Ludhiana, Jalandhar, Hissar, Jaipur, Kanpur, Udaipur, Bhilwara, Banswara, Chittorgarh, Dungarpur, Pratapgarh, Singrauli, Obra., Renukoot, Varanasi, Ajmer, Kota, Rawat Bhatta, Lucknow, Rae Bareli, Allahabad, Jodhpur, Bikaner, and Jaisalmer. New congregations have also been started at BITS Pilani, and Pali. Allahabad has also witnessed an amicable settlement with the CNI Church, and a vicar has been nominated for the church there.

Today, there are thirteen parishes in and around Delhi alone – Hauz Khas, Janakpuri, Tughlakabad, Sarita Vihar, Mayur Vihar-I, Mayur Vihar-III, Rohini, Dwarka, Dilshad Garden, Ghaziabad, Noida, Gurugram and Faridabad. Overall, there are sixty one parishes including some congregations looked after by one Ramban and thirty six priests, spread over Uttar Pradesh, Rajasthan, Madhya Pradesh, Haryana, Delhi and United Arab Emirates.

In 1975, the Delhi Diocese was constituted by the Holy Synod, along with the four other new dioceses of Madras, Bombay, Calcutta and America. The next year, Paulose Mar Gregorios took charge as the Metropolitan of Delhi. By 1985, the Diocesan headquarters moved to its own building, the Delhi Orthodox Centre in Tughlaqabad in South Delhi. An architecturally distinctive three-storey building, the centre was dedicated by Catholicos Baselios Mar Thoma Mathews I and inaugurated by the Vice-President of India, R Venkataraman, in November 1984. With the St. Thomas Chapel in the middle, the centre is the residence of the Metropolitan and houses, besides the secretariat of the Diocesan Council, a library, a publication unit, the People's Education Society, Sophia Society, Sarva Dharma Nilaya, Dhyan Mandir and Niti Santi Kendra, engaged in a variety of complementary activities. In 1991, the Diocese was strengthened by the arrival of Job Mar Philoxenos as the Assistant Metropolitan.

== Parish list ==
- Agra St. Thomas Orthodox Church
- Ajmer St. George Orthodox Church
- Allahabad St. Thomas Orthodox Church
- Al Ain St. Dionysius Orthodox Church
- Ambala St.Thomas Orthodox Church
- Bharatpur Mar Gregorios Orthodox Church
- Bhiwadi Mar Gregorios Orthodox Church
- Bikaner St. Marys Orthodox Church
- Chandigarh St. Marys Orthodox Church
- Dholpur St. Marys Orthodox Church
- Dilshad Garden St. Stephens Orthodox Church
- Dubai St. Thomas Orthodox Cathedral
- Dwarka St. George Orthodox Church
- Faridabad St. Mary's Orthodox Church
- Ghaziabad St.Thomas Orthodox Church
- Gurugram St. Gregorios Orthodox Church
- Gwalior St. Paul's Orthodox Church
- Ganganagar St. George Orthodox Church
- Haridwar St. George Orthodox Church
- Hauz Khas St. Marys Orthodox Cathedral
- Jaipur St.Thomas Orthodox Church
- Jalandhar St. George Orthodox Church
- Janakpuri Mar Gregorios Orthodox Church
- Jebel Ali St.Gregorios Orthodox Church
- Jhansi St. George Orthodox Church
- Jodhpur Mar Gregorios Orthodox Church
- Kanpur St. Marys Orthodox Church
- Lucknow Mar Gregorios Orthodox Church
- Ludhiana Mar Gregorios Orthodox Church
- Mayur Vihar Phase I St. John's Orthodox Church
- Mayur Vihar Phase III St. James Orthodox Church
- Meerut Mar Gregorios Orthodox Church
- Noida Mar Gregorios Orthodox Church
- Pali St. George Orthodox Church
- Renukoott St.Thomas Orthodox Church
- Rohini St. Basil Orthodox Church
- Sarita Vihar St.Thomas Orthodox Church
- Sharjah Mar Gregorios Orthodox Church
- Singrauli Mar Gregorios Orthodox Church
- Varanasi St. Mary's Orthodox Church
- V.K.I Area (Jaipur) St. Marys Orthodox Church
- Tughlakabad St. Joseph's Orthodox Church
