= David Larson (poker player) =

Amateur poker player

World Series of Poker
- Bracelet: None
- Final table: None
- Money finishes: 11

World Poker Tour
- Title: 1
- Final table: 1
- Money finish: 1

David Larson is an amateur poker player best known for winning the World Poker Tour Rolling Thunder (2018).

Other results include five cashes on the World Poker Tour DeepStacks Tour (WPT sub (amateur) tour), a DeepStack Extravaganza ($970 + 130 No Limit Hold'em - Mid-States Poker Tour (MSPT) (Event #29)) final table ($22,876), and a Venetian DeepStack Extravaganza ($2,500 No Limit Hold'em - UltimateStack (Event 27)) 14th place ($14,180).

As of August 2023, Larson's total live tournament winnings exceeds $500,000.
