= Logotherapy =

Psychotherapeutic approach

Logotherapy is a form of existential therapy developed by neurologist and psychiatrist Viktor Frankl. It is founded on the premise that the primary motivational force of individuals is to find meaning in life. Frankl describes it as "the Third Viennese School of Psychotherapy" along with Freud's psychoanalysis and Alfred Adler's individual psychology.

Logotherapy is based on an existential analysis focusing on Kierkegaard's will to meaning as opposed to Adler's Nietzschean doctrine of will to power or Freud's will to pleasure. Rather than power or pleasure, logotherapy is founded upon the belief that striving to find meaning in life is the primary, most powerful motivating and driving force in humans. A short introduction to this system is given in Frankl's most famous book, Man's Search for Meaning (1946), in which he outlines how his theories helped him to survive his Holocaust experience and how that experience further developed and reinforced his theories. Presently, there are a number of logotherapy institutes around the world.

== Basic principles ==
The notion of logotherapy was created with the Greek word logos ("meaning"). Frankl's concept is based on the premise that the primary motivational force of an individual is to find meaning in life. The following list of tenets represents basic principles of logotherapy:

- Life has meaning under all circumstances, even the most miserable ones.
- Our main motivation for living is our will to find meaning in life.
- We have freedom to find meaning in what we do, and what we experience, or at least in the stance we take when faced with a situation of unchangeable suffering.

The human spirit is referred to in several of the assumptions of logotherapy, but the use of the term spirit is not "spiritual" or "religious." In Frankl's view, the spirit is the will of the human being. The emphasis, therefore, is on the search for meaning, which is not necessarily the search for God or any other supernatural being. Frankl also noted the barriers to humanity's quest for meaning in life. He warns against "...affluence, hedonism, [and] materialism..." in the search for meaning.

Purpose in life and meaning in life constructs appeared in Frankl's logotherapy writings with relation to existential vacuum and will to meaning, as well as others who have theorized about and defined positive psychological functioning. Frankl observed that it may be psychologically damaging when a person's search for meaning is blocked. Positive life purpose and meaning were associated with strong religious beliefs, membership in groups, dedication to a cause, life values, and clear goals. Adult development and maturity theories include the purpose in life concept. Maturity emphasizes a clear comprehension of life's purpose, directedness, and intentionality which contributes to the feeling that life is meaningful.

Furthermore, Frankl’s (2006) theory also supports that logotherapy can help individuals discover meaning in their lives, leading to increased self-confidence and happiness. Frankl also emphasized the individuality of human purpose, stating that “Everyone has his own specific vocation or mission in life to carry out a concrete assignment which demands fulfillment… Everyone's task is as unique as is his specific opportunity to implement it.” Frankl’s Logotherapy encourages individuals to recognize and pursue their unique meaning in life.

Frankl's ideas were operationalized by Crumbaugh and Maholick's Purpose in Life (PIL) test, which measures an individual's meaning and purpose in life. With the test, investigators found that meaning in life mediated the relationships between religiosity and well-being; uncontrollable stress and substance use; depression and self-derogation. Crumbaugh found that the Seeking of Noetic Goals Test (SONG) is a complementary measure of the PIL. While the PIL measures the presence of meaning, the SONG measures orientation towards meaning. A low score in the PIL but a high score in the SONG, would predict a better outcome in the application of Logotherapy.

=== Discovering meaning ===
According to Frankl, "We can discover this meaning in life in three different ways: (1) by creating a work or doing a deed; (2) by experiencing something or encountering someone; and (3) by the attitude we take toward unavoidable suffering" and that "everything can be taken from a man but one thing: the last of the human freedoms – to choose one's attitude in any given set of circumstances". On the meaning of suffering, Frankl gives the following example:

"Once, an elderly general practitioner consulted me because of his severe depression. He could not overcome the loss of his wife who had died two years before and whom he had loved above all else. Now how could I help him? What should I tell him? I refrained from telling him anything, but instead confronted him with a question, "What would have happened, Doctor, if you had died first, and your wife would have had to survive without you?:" "Oh," he said, "for her this would have been terrible; how she would have suffered!" Whereupon I replied, "You see, Doctor, such a suffering has been spared her, and it is you who have spared her this suffering; but now, you have to pay for it by surviving and mourning her." He said no word but shook my hand and calmly left the office.

Frankl emphasized that realizing the value of suffering is meaningful only when the first two creative possibilities are not available (for example, in a concentration camp) and only when such suffering is inevitable – he was not proposing that people suffer unnecessarily.

== Philosophical basis of logotherapy ==
Frankl described the meta-clinical implications of logotherapy in his book The Will to Meaning: Foundations and Applications of Logotherapy. He believed that there is no psychotherapy apart from the theory of the individual. As an existential psychologist, he inherently disagreed with the "machine model" or "rat model", as it undermines the human quality of humans. As a neurologist and psychiatrist, Frankl developed a unique view of determinism to coexist with the three basic pillars of logotherapy (the freedom of will). Though Frankl admitted that a person can never be free from every condition, such as, biological, sociological, or psychological determinants; based on his experience during his life in the Nazi concentration camps, he believed that a person is "capable of resisting and braving even the worst conditions". In doing such, a person can detach from situations and themselves, choose an attitude about themselves, and determine their own determinants, thus shaping their own character and becoming responsible for themselves.

== Logotherapeutic views and treatment ==
=== Overcoming anxiety ===
By recognizing the purpose of our circumstances, one can master anxiety. Anecdotes about this use of logotherapy are given by New York Times writer Tim Sanders, who explained how he uses its concept to relieve the stress of fellow airline travelers by asking them the purpose of their journey. When he does this, no matter how miserable they are, their whole demeanor changes, and they remain happy throughout the flight. Overall, Frankl believed that the anxious individual does not understand that their anxiety is the result of dealing with a sense of "unfulfilled responsibility" and ultimately a lack of meaning.

=== Treatment of neurosis ===
Frankl cites two neurotic pathogens: hyper-intention, a forced intention toward some end which makes that end unattainable; and hyper-reflection, an excessive attention to oneself which stifles attempts to avoid the neurosis to which one thinks oneself predisposed. Frankl identified anticipatory anxiety, a fear of a given outcome which makes that outcome more likely. To relieve the anticipatory anxiety and treat the resulting neuroses, logotherapy offers paradoxical intention, wherein the patient intends to do the opposite of their hyper-intended goal.

A person, then, who fears (i.e. experiences anticipatory anxiety over) not getting a good night's sleep may try too hard (that is, hyper-intend) to fall asleep, and this would hinder their ability to do so. A logotherapist would recommend, then, that the person go to bed and intentionally try not to fall asleep. This would relieve the anticipatory anxiety which kept the person awake in the first place, thus allowing them to fall asleep in an acceptable amount of time.

=== Depression ===
Viktor Frankl believed depression occurred at the psychological, physiological, and spiritual levels. At the psychological level, he believed that feelings of inadequacy stem from undertaking tasks beyond our abilities. At the physiological level, he recognized a "vital low", which he defined as a "diminishment of physical energy". Finally, Frankl believed that at the spiritual level, the depressed individual faces tension between who they actually are in relation to what they should be. Frankl refers to this as the gaping abyss. Finally Frankl suggests that if goals seem unreachable, an individual loses a sense of future and thus meaning, resulting in depression. Thus logotherapy aims "to change the patient's attitude toward their disease as well as toward their life as a task".

In order to overcome depressed feelings and thoughts, Frankl challenges individuals who have depression to find meaning in their suffering. Frankl frequently cites Nietzsche's words, "If we have our own why in life, we shall get along with almost any how". Suffering and all the negative emotions that come with it are a normal part of the human experience and should even be expected. Edith Weisskopf-Joelson, a psychologist and follower of logotherapy, argues that "our current mental-hygiene philosophy stresses the idea that people ought to be happy, that unhappiness is a symptom of maladjustment. Such a value system might be responsible for the fact that the burden of unavoidable unhappiness is increased by unhappiness about being unhappy".

=== Obsessive–compulsive disorder ===
Frankl believed that those with obsessive–compulsive disorder lack the sense of completion that most other individuals possess. Instead of fighting the tendencies to repeat thoughts or actions, or focusing on changing the individual symptoms of the disease, the therapist should focus on "transform[ing] the neurotic's attitude toward their neurosis". Therefore, it is important to recognize that the patient is "not responsible for his obsessional ideas", but that "he is certainly responsible for his attitude toward these ideas". Frankl suggested that it is important for the patient to recognize their inclinations toward perfection as fate, and therefore, must learn to accept some degrees of uncertainty. Ultimately, following the premise of logotherapy, the patient must eventually ignore their obsessional thoughts and find meaning in their life despite such thoughts.

=== Schizophrenia ===
Though logotherapy was not intended to deal with severe disorders, Frankl believed that logotherapy could benefit even those with schizophrenia. He recognized the roots of schizophrenia in physiological dysfunction. In this dysfunction, the person with schizophrenia "experiences himself as an object" rather than as a subject. Frankl suggested that a person with schizophrenia could be helped by logotherapy by first being taught to ignore voices and to end persistent self-observation. Then, during this same period, the person with schizophrenia must be led toward meaningful activity, as "even for the schizophrenic there remains that residue of freedom toward fate and toward the disease which man always possesses, no matter how ill he may be, in all situations and at every moment of life, to the very last".

=== Terminally ill patients ===
In 1977, Terry Zuehlke and John Watkins conducted a study analyzing the effectiveness of logotherapy in treating terminally ill patients. The study's design used 20 male Veterans Administration volunteers who were randomly assigned to one of two possible treatments – (1) group that received eight 45-minute sessions over a 2-week period and (2) group used as control that received delayed treatment. Each group was tested on five scales – the MMPI K Scale, MMPI L Scale, Death Anxiety Scale, Brief Psychiatric Rating Scale, and the Purpose of Life Test. The results showed an overall significant difference between the control and treatment groups. While the univariate analyses showed that there were significant group differences in 3/5 of the dependent measures. These results confirm the idea that terminally ill patients can benefit from logotherapy in coping with death.

=== Forms of treatment ===
Ecce Homo is a method used in logotherapy. It requires of the therapist to note the innate strengths that people have and how they have dealt with adversity and suffering in life; to ask the patient to consider how, despite everything a person may have gone through, they made the best of their suffering. The method is called "Ecce Homo", which is Latin for "Behold the Man", because the method involves beholding how other people have made the best of their adversity.

== Critiques ==
=== Authoritarianism ===
In 1961 Rollo May argued that logotherapy is, in essence, authoritarian. He suggested that Frankl's therapy presents a plain solution to all of life's problems, an assertion that would seem to undermine the complexity of human life itself. May contended that if a patient could not find their own meaning, Frankl would provide a goal for his patient. In effect, this would negate the patient's personal responsibility, thus "diminish[ing] the patient as a person". Frankl explicitly replied to May's arguments through a written dialogue, sparked by Rabbi Reuven Bulka's article "Is Logotherapy Authoritarian?". Frankl responded that he combined the prescription of medication, if necessary, with logotherapy, to deal with the person's psychological and emotional reaction to the illness, and highlighted areas of freedom and responsibility, where the person is free to search and to find meaning.

=== Religiousness ===
Critical views of the life and word of logotherapy's founder and his work assume that Frankl's religious background and experience of suffering guided his conception of meaning within the boundaries of the person and therefore that logotherapy is founded on Viktor Frankl's worldview. Some researchers argue that logotherapy is not a "scientific" psychotherapeutic school in the traditional sense but a philosophy of life, a system of values, or a secular religion that is not fully coherent and based on questionable metaphysical premises.

Frankl openly spoke and wrote on religion and psychiatry, throughout his life, and specifically in his last book, Man's Search for Ultimate Meaning (1997). He asserted that every person has a spiritual unconscious, independently of religious views or beliefs, yet Frankl's conception of the spiritual unconscious does not necessarily entail religiosity. In Frankl's words: "It is true, Logotherapy, deals with the Logos; it deals with Meaning. Specifically, I see Logotherapy in helping others to see meaning in life. But we cannot 'give' meaning to the life of others. And if this is true of meaning per se, how much does it hold for Ultimate Meaning?" The American Psychiatric Association awarded Viktor Frankl the 1985 Oskar Pfister Award (for important contributions to religion and psychiatry).

== Recent developments ==
Since the 1990s, the number of institutes providing education and training in logotherapy continues to increase worldwide. Numerous logotherapeutic concepts have been integrated and applied in different fields, such as cognitive behavioral therapy, acceptance and commitment therapy (ACT), and burnout prevention. The logotherapeutic concepts of noogenic neurosis and existential crisis were added to the ICD 11 under the name demoralisation crisis, i.e. a construct that features hopelessness, meaninglessness, and existential distress as first described by Frankl in the 1950s. Logotherapy has also been associated with psychosomatic and physiological health benefits. Besides Logotherapy, other meaning-centered psychotherapeutic approaches such as positive psychology and meaning therapy have emerged. Paul Wong's meaning therapy attempts to translate logotherapy into psychological mechanisms, integrating cognitive behavioral therapy, positive psychotherapy and the positive psychology research on meaning. Logotherapy is also being applied in the field of oncology and palliative care (William Breitbart). These recent developments introduce Viktor Frankl's logotherapy to a new generation and extend its impact to new areas of research.

== Locations ==
A number of logotherapeutic institutes have been established in various countries around the world and include:

=== Africa ===
- Viktor Frankl Institute of Logotherapy South Africa

=== Asia ===
- The Viktor Frankl Center for Logotherapy in Israel
- Japan Logotherapist Association

=== Australia ===
- Viktor Frankl Institute Australia

=== Europe ===
- Viktor Frankl Zentrum Wien
- Viktor Frankl Institute of Ireland
- Logotherapy Institute of Finland
- Logotherapy Institute of Serbia
- Viktor Frankl Institute of Logotherapy – Prague, Czech Republic
- Viktor Frankl Institute of Turkey

=== North America ===
- Viktor Frankl Institute of America - USA
- Viktor Frankl Institute of Logotherapy - USA
- Ottawa Institute of Logotherapy - Canada
- Sociedad Mexicana de Análisis Existencial y Logoterapia

=== South America ===
- Fundacion Argentina de Logoterapia – Buenos Aires
- Associação Brasileira de Logoterapia e Análise Existencial Frankliana (SOBRAL)

=== Online ===
- Viktor Frankl Institute – Vienna, Austria
- Viktor Frankl Institute of America
- Viktor Frankl Institute of Logotherapy - USA
- Graduate Theologial Foundation: Doctoral Programs with a Concentration in Logotherapy and Existential Analysis

== See also ==
- Existential therapy
- Ikigai, similar Japanese concept

== Bibliography ==
- Frankl, Viktor Man's Search for Meaning. An Introduction to Logotherapy, Beacon Press, Boston, MA, 2006. ISBN 978-0-8070-1427-1
- Frankl, Viktor (12 October 1986). The Doctor and the Soul: From Psychotherapy to Logotherapy. Random House Digital, Inc. ISBN 978-0-394-74317-2. Retrieved 17 May 2012.
- Frankl, Viktor Psychotherapy and Existentialism. Selected Papers on Logotherapy, Simon & Schuster, New York, 1967. ISBN 0-671-20056-9
- Frankl, Viktor The Will to Meaning. Foundations and Applications of Logotherapy, New American Library, New York, 1988 ISBN 0-452-01034-9
- Frankl, Viktor The Unheard Cry for Meaning. Psychotherapy and Humanism, Simon & Schuster, New York, 2011 ISBN 978-1-4516-6438-6
- Frankl, Viktor On the Theory and Therapy of Mental Disorders. An Introduction to Logotherapy and Existential Analysis, Brunner-Routledge, London-New York, 2004. ISBN 0-415-95029-5
- Frankl, Viktor Viktor Frankl Recollections. An Autobiography, Basic Books, Cambridge, MA 2000. ISBN 978-0-7382-0355-3.
- Frankl, Viktor Man's Search for Ultimate Meaning. Perseus Book Publishing, New York, 1997; ISBN 978-0-7382-0354-6.
