= Viktor Frankl =

Austrian neurologist (1905–1997)

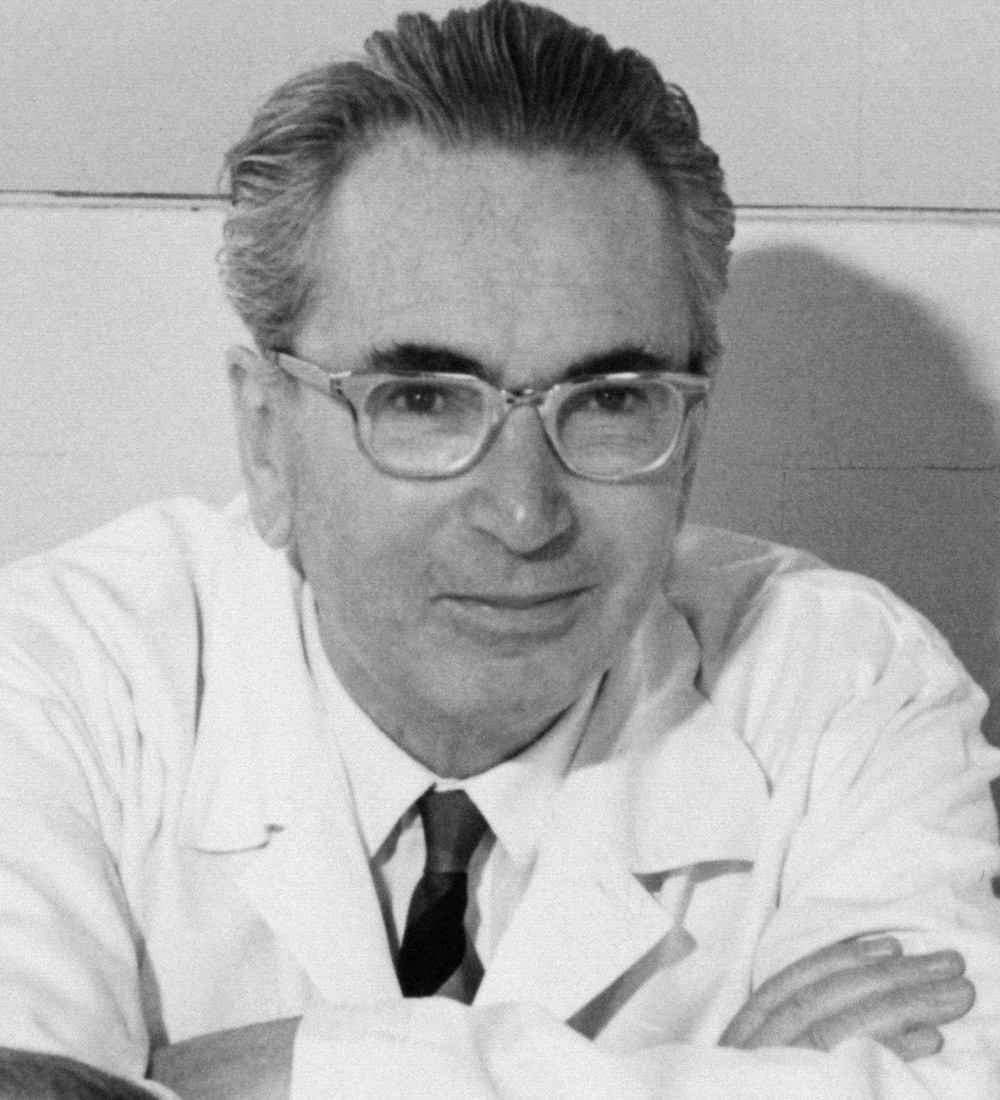
- Frankl in 1965
- Born: Viktor Emil Frankl; 26 March 1905; Vienna, Austria-Hungary
- Died: 2 September 1997 (aged 92); Vienna, Austria
- Resting place: Vienna Central Cemetery
- Occupations: Neurologist, psychiatrist, philosopher, author
- Known for: Logotherapy; Existential analysis
- Spouse(s): Tilly Grosser, m. 1941–1945 (her death); Eleonore Katharina Schwindt, m. 1947
- Children: 1

Academic background
- Education: University of Vienna (MD, 1930; PhD, 1948)
- Doctoral advisor: Hubert Rohracher (PhD advisor)

Viktor Emil Frankl (Austrian German: [ˈfraŋkl̩]; 26 March 1905 – 2 September 1997) was an Austrian neurologist, psychiatrist, philosopher, and Holocaust survivor, who founded logotherapy, a school of psychotherapy that describes a search for a life's meaning as the central human motivational force. Logotherapy is part of existential and humanistic psychology theories.

Logotherapy was promoted as the third school of Viennese Psychotherapy, after those established by Sigmund Freud and Alfred Adler.

Frankl wrote 39 books. The best-selling autobiographical book Man's Search for Meaning is based on his experiences in various Nazi concentration camps.

== Early life ==
Frankl was the second among three children of Gabriel Frankl, a civil servant in the Ministry of Social Service, and Elsa (née Lion), a Jewish family in Vienna, in what was then the Austro-Hungarian Empire. His interest in psychology and the role of meaning developed when he began taking night classes on applied psychology while in junior high school. As a teenager, he began a correspondence with Sigmund Freud and Freud asked for permission to publish one of his papers. After graduation from high school in 1923, he studied medicine at the University of Vienna.

In 1924, Frankl's first scientific paper was published in the Internationale Zeitschrift für Psychoanalyse. In the same year, he was president of the Sozialistische Mittelschüler Österreich, the Social Democratic Party of Austria's youth movement for high school students. Frankl's father was a socialist who named him after Viktor Adler, the founder of the party. During this time, Frankl began questioning the Freudian approach to psychoanalysis. He joined Alfred Adler's circle of students and published his second academic paper, "Psychotherapy and Worldview" ("Psychotherapie und Weltanschauung"), in Adler's International Journal of Individual Psychology in 1925. Frankl was expelled from Adler's circle when he insisted that meaning was the central motivational force in human beings. From 1926, he began refining his theory, which he termed logotherapy.

== Career ==
=== Psychiatry ===
Between 1928 and 1930, while still a medical student, he organized youth counselling centers to address the high number of teen suicides occurring around the time of end-of-the-year report cards. The program was sponsored by the city of Vienna and free of charge to the students. Frankl recruited other psychologists for the center, including Charlotte Bühler, Erwin Wexberg, and Rudolf Dreikurs. In 1931, not a single Viennese student died by suicide.

After earning his M.D. in 1930, Frankl gained extensive experience at Steinhof Psychiatric Hospital, where he was responsible for the treatment of suicidal women. In 1937, he began a private practice, but the Nazi annexation of Austria in 1938 limited his opportunity to treat patients. In 1940, he joined Rothschild Hospital, the only hospital in Vienna still admitting Jews, as head of the neurology department. Prior to his deportation to the concentration camps, he helped numerous patients avoid the Nazi euthanasia program that targeted the mentally disabled.

In 1942, just nine months after his marriage, Frankl and his family were sent to the Theresienstadt concentration camp. His father died there of starvation and pneumonia. In 1944, Frankl and his surviving relatives were transported to Auschwitz, where his mother and brother were murdered in the gas chambers. His wife Tilly died later of typhus in Bergen-Belsen. Frankl spent three years in four concentration camps.

Following the war, he became head of the neurology department of the General Polyclinic Vienna hospital, and established a private practice in his home. He worked with patients until his retirement in 1970.

In 1948, Frankl earned a PhD in philosophy from the University of Vienna. His dissertation, The Unconscious God, examines the relationship between psychology and religion, and advocates for the use of the Socratic dialogue (self-discovery discourse) for clients to get in touch with their spiritual unconscious.

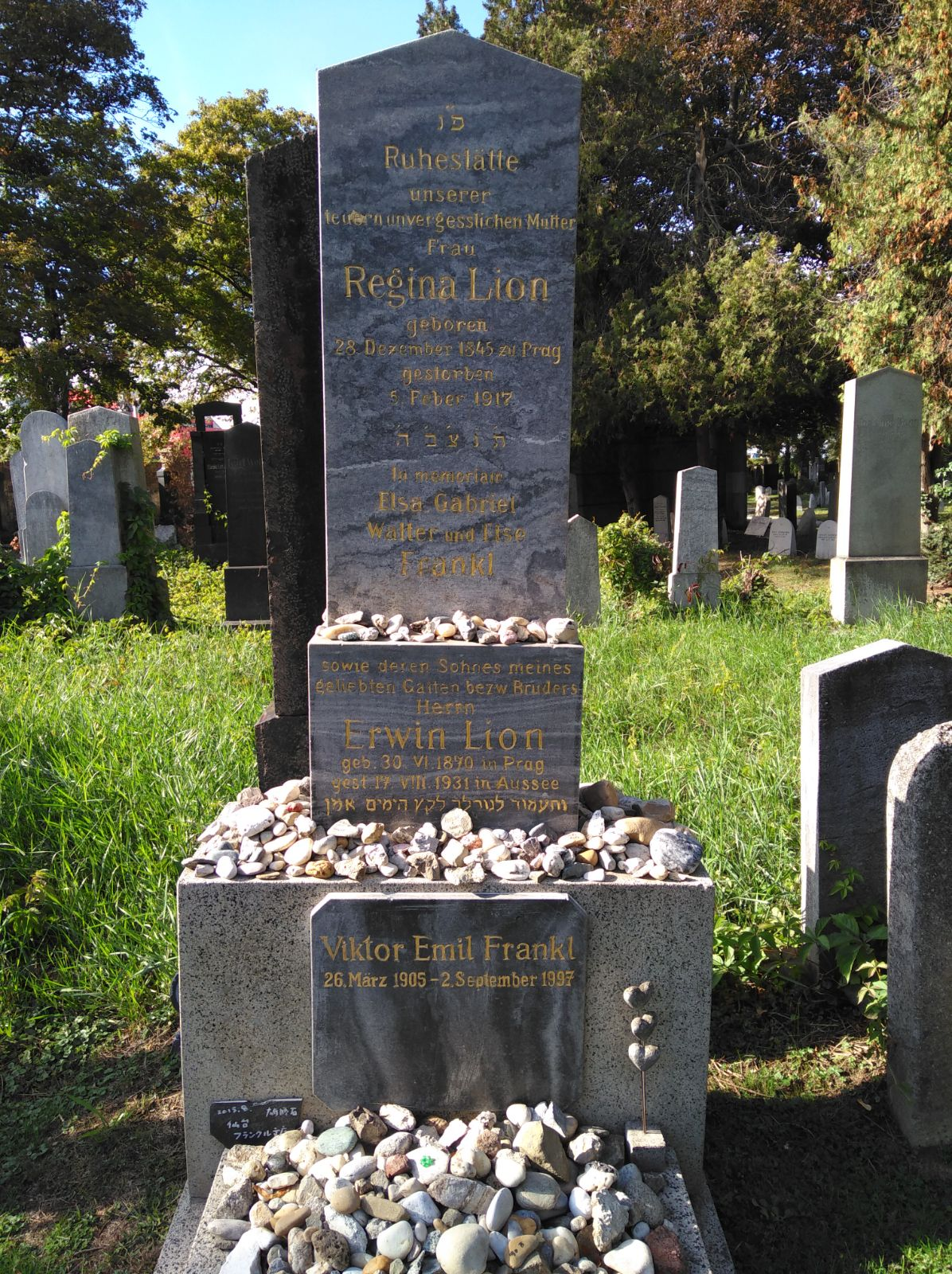
Grave of Viktor Frankl in Vienna

In 1955, Frankl was awarded a professorship of neurology and psychiatry at the University of Vienna, and, as visiting professor, lectured at Harvard University (1961), Southern Methodist University, Dallas (1966), and Duquesne University, Pittsburgh (1972).

Throughout his career, Frankl argued that the reductionist tendencies of early psychotherapeutic approaches dehumanised the patient, and advocated for a rehumanisation of psychotherapy.

The American Psychiatric Association awarded Frankl the 1985 Oskar Pfister Award for his contributions to religion and psychiatry.

=== Man's Search for Meaning ===
While head of the Neurological Department at the General Polyclinic Hospital, Frankl wrote Man's Search for Meaning over a nine-day period. The book, originally titled A Psychologist Experiences the Concentration Camp, was released in German in 1946. The English translation of Man's Search for Meaning was published in 1959, and became an international bestseller. Frankl saw this success as a symptom of the "mass neurosis of modern times," since the title promised to deal with the question of life's meaningfulness. Millions of copies were sold in dozens of languages. In a 1991 survey conducted for the Library of Congress and the Book of the Month Club, Man's Search for Meaning was named one of the ten most influential books in the US.

There is much wisdom in the words of Nietzsche: "He who has a why to live for can bear almost any how." I can see in these words a motto which holds true for any psychotherapy. In the Nazi concentration camps, one could have witnessed that those who knew that there was a task waiting for them to fulfill were most apt to survive.

=== Logotherapy and existential analysis ===
Frankl developed logotherapy and existential analysis, which are based on philosophical and psychological concepts, particularly the desire to find a meaning in life and free will. Frankl identified three main ways of realizing meaning in life: by making a difference in the world, by having particular experiences, or by adopting particular attitudes.

The primary techniques offered by logotherapy and existential analysis are:

- Paradoxical intention: clients learn to overcome obsessions or anxieties by self-distancing and humorous exaggeration.
- Dereflection: drawing the client's attention away from their symptoms, as hyper-reflection can lead to inaction.
- Socratic dialogue and attitude modification: asking questions designed to help a client find and pursue self-defined meaning in life.

His acknowledgement of meaning as a central motivational force and factor in mental health is his lasting contribution to the field of psychology. It provided the foundational principles for the emerging field of positive psychology. Frankl's work has also been endorsed in the Chabad philosophy of Hasidic Judaism.

His first book on the subject of Logotherapy, The Doctor and the Soul, was originally written while he was detained in concentration camps. He had the first manuscript hidden in the lining of his jacket, but when he was transferred to Auschwitz, the guards took his clothes away. In Man's Search for Meaning, Frankl says that the effort to reconstruct the book from memory on little slips of paper helped keep him alive and motivated.

=== Statue of Responsibility ===
In Man's Search for Meaning, Frankl states:

Freedom, however, is not the last word. Freedom is only part of the story and half of the truth. Freedom is but the negative aspect of the whole phenomenon whose positive aspect is responsibleness. In fact, freedom is in danger of degenerating into mere arbitrariness unless it is lived in terms of responsibleness. That is why I recommend that the Statue of Liberty on the East Coast be supplemented by a Statue of Responsibility on the West Coast.

Frankl's concept for the statue grew in popularity, and drew the affection of Stephen Covey, author of The 7 Habits of Highly Effective People. Covey teamed up with Kevin Hall to push the idea of the statue forward in the 1990s, and eventually commissioned the sculptor Gary Lee Price who came up with the concept of two hands clasped together. The design was approved by Frankl's widow, and they began looking for a location to construct it. Their first choice was California, to have it in a Pacific Ocean harbour to complement the Statue of Liberty's position in the Atlantic harbour of New York. However, the state regulations proved difficult to navigate, and the governor of Utah, Spencer Cox, suggested a location in his state for the project, which was approved in 2023.

On 6 June 2025, Alliant International University unveiled a 15-foot statue that honors Frankl titled: "Statue of Responsibility".

== Controversy ==
=== "Auschwitz survivor" testimony ===
In The Missing Pieces of the Puzzle: A Reflection on the Odd Career of Viktor Frankl, Professor of history Timothy Pytell of California State University, San Bernardino, surveys the numerous discrepancies and omissions in Frankl's "Auschwitz survivor" account and later autobiography, which many of his contemporaries, such as Thomas Szasz, similarly have raised. Frankl's book Man's Search for Meaning devotes approximately half of its contents to describing Auschwitz and the psychology of its prisoners, suggesting a long stay at the death camp. However his wording is contradictory and, according to Pytell, "profoundly deceptive". Contrary to the impression Frankl gives of staying at Auschwitz for months, he was held close to the train in the "depot prisoner" area of Auschwitz, and for no more than a few days. Frankl was neither registered at Auschwitz nor assigned a number there before being sent on to a subsidiary work camp of Dachau, known as Kaufering III. That camp, together with Terezín, is the true setting for much of what is described in his book.

In the book Man's Search for Meaning there is no suggestion that Frankl was detained in Auschwitz long term, and most of his experience is specified to take place at a work-camp detachment of Dachau.

=== Origins and implications of logotherapy ===
Frankl's doctrine was that one must instill meaning in the events in one's life, that work and suffering can lead to finding meaning, and that this would ultimately lead to fulfillment and happiness. In 1982, the scholar and Holocaust analyst Lawrence L. Langer was critical of what he called Frankl's distortions of the true experience of those at Auschwitz, and of Frankl's amoral focus on "meaning". In Langer's assessment, that view could just as equally be applied to Nazis "finding meaning in making the world free from Jews". He continued, "if this [logotherapy] doctrine had been more succinctly worded, the Nazis might have substituted it for the cruel mockery of Arbeit Macht Frei" ("work sets free"), which was read by those entering Auschwitz]. In Pytell's view, Langer also challenged Frankl's disturbing subtext that Holocaust "survival [was] a matter of mental health." He criticized Frankl's tone as self-congratulatory and promotional, so that "it comes as no surprise to the reader, as he closes the volume, that the real hero of Man's Search for Meaning is not man, but Viktor Frankl".

Pytell later remarked that with Langer's criticism published prior to Pytell's biography, the former had thus drawn the controversial parallels, or accommodations in ideology without the knowledge that Victor Frankl was an advocate (had "embraced") the key ideas of the Nazi psychotherapy movement ("will and responsibility") as a form of therapy in the late 1930s. Frankl submitted a paper at that time and contributed to the Göring institute in Vienna 1937 and again in early 1938, connecting the logotherapy focus on "world-view" to the "work of some of the leading Nazi psychotherapists", both at a time before Austria was annexed by Nazi Germany in 1938. Frankl's founding logotherapy paper was published in the Zentrallblatt fuer Psychotherapie [sic], the journal of the Göring Institute, with the "proclaimed agenda of building psychotherapy that affirmed a Nazi-oriented worldview".

The origins of logotherapy raise a major issue of continuity, which Pytell argues was potentially problematic for Frankl because he had laid out the main elements of logotherapy while contributing to the Nazi-affiliated Göring Institute. This association was a source of controversy, since it suggested that logotherapy was palatable to Nazism. Pytell suggested that Frankl took two different stances on how the concentration-camp experience affected the course of his psychotherapy theory. Over the years, Frankl would switch between the idea that logotherapy took shape in the camps and the claim that the camps were merely a testing ground of his already preconceived theories.

=== Post-war Jewish relations ===
In the post war years, Frankl's preference for neither pursuing justice nor assigning collective guilt to the Austrian people for collaboration with or acquiescence to Nazism led to "frayed" relationships with many Viennese and the larger American Jewish community. In 1978, when attempting to give a lecture at the institute of Adult Jewish Studies in New York, Frankl was confronted with an outburst of boos from the audience and was called a "nazi pig". Frankl supported forgiveness and held that many in Germany and Austria had been powerless to do anything about the atrocities which occurred and could not be collectively blamed.

In 1988 Frankl would further "stir up sentiment against him" by being photographed next to the president of Austria President Waldheim and accepting the Great Silver Medal with Star for Services to the Republic of Austria from him. At the time Waldheim was embroiled in a controversy over revelations that he had lied about his Second World War military record and was under investigation for complicity in Nazi war crimes. Although it was later concluded that Waldheim was not involved in war crimes, Frankl's acceptance of the medal was viewed by many in the international Jewish community as a betrayal.

=== Response to Timothy Pytell ===
According to Alexander Batthyány (the director of the Viktor Frankl Institute and the Viktor Frankl Archives in Vienna), Pytell's critique of Viktor Frankl was used by Holocaust denier Theodore O'Keefe. Throughout the first chapter of his book Viktor Frankl and the Shoah, Batthyány reflects on the flaws in Pytell's work about Frankl. Batthyány points out that Pytell never visited the archive to consult primary sources, nor did he interview Viktor Frankl. Pytell wrote in his book on Frankl that he had the opportunity to meet him – as a friend offered it – yet decided that he could not.

== Decorations and awards ==
- 1956: Promotion Award for Public Education of the Ministry of Education, Austria
- 1962: Cardinal Innitzer Prize, Austria
- 1969: Austrian Cross of Honour for Science and Art, 1st class
- 1976: Prize of the Danubia Foundation
- 1980: Honorary Ring of Vienna, Austria
- 1981: Austrian Decoration for Science and Art
- 1985: Oskar Pfister Award, US
- 1986: Honorary doctorate from the University of Vienna, Austria
- 1986: Honorary member of the association Bürgervereinigung Landsberg im 20. Jahrhundert
- 1988: Great Silver Medal with Star for Services to the Republic of Austria
- 1995: Hans Prinzhorn Medal
- 1995: Honorary Citizen of the City of Vienna
- 1995: Great Gold Medal with Star for Services to the Republic of Austria

== Personal life ==
In 1941, Frankl married Tilly Grosser, who was a station nurse at Rothschild Hospital. Soon after they were married she became pregnant, but they were forced to abort the child. Tilly died in the Bergen Belsen concentration camp.

Frankl's father, Gabriel, originally from Pohořelice, Moravia, died in the Theresienstadt Ghetto concentration camp on 13 February 1943, aged 81, from starvation and pneumonia. His mother and brother, Walter, were both killed in Auschwitz. His sister, Stella, escaped to Australia.

In 1947, Frankl married Eleonore "Elly" Katharina Schwindt, who was a practicing Catholic. The couple respected each other's religious backgrounds, both attending church and synagogue, and celebrating Christmas and Hanukkah. Although it was not known for 50 years, his wife and son-in-law reported after his death that he prayed every day and had memorized the words of daily Jewish prayers and psalms.

Viktor and Elly Frankl had one daughter, Gabriele, who went on to become a child psychologist. Frankl's grandson, Alexander Vesely, is a licensed psychotherapist, producer and documentary film director, who co-founded the Viktor Frankl Institute of America. Alexander Vesely produced, filmed, and edited the documentary Viktor & I.

Frankl was also an "avid mountain climber," until he was 80 years old. There are three "difficult" trails in the Austrian Alps named after him.

Frankl died of heart failure in Vienna on 2 September 1997. He is buried in the Jewish section of the Vienna Central Cemetery.

== Bibliography ==
His books in English are:

- Man's Search for Meaning: An Introduction to Logotherapy, Beacon Press, Boston, 2006. ISBN 978-0807014271. (English translation 1959. Originally published in 1946 as Ein Psychologe erlebt das Konzentrationslager, A Psychologist Experiences the Concentration Camp.)
- The Doctor and the Soul (originally titled Ärztliche Seelsorge), Random House, 1955.
- On the Theory and Therapy of Mental Disorders: An Introduction to Logotherapy and Existential Analysis. Translated by James M. DuBois. Brunner-Routledge, London & New York, 2004. ISBN 0415950295.
- Psychotherapy and Existentialism: Selected Papers on Logotherapy. Simon & Schuster, New York, 1967. ISBN 0671200569.
- The Will to Meaning: Foundations and Applications of Logotherapy. New American Library, New York, 1988. ISBN 0452010349.
- The Unheard Cry for Meaning: Psychotherapy and Humanism. Simon & Schuster, New York, 2011 ISBN 978-1451664386.
- Recollections: An Autobiography; Basic Books, Cambridge, MA 2000. ISBN 978-0738203553.
- Man's Search for Ultimate Meaning. (A revised and extended edition of The Unconscious God; with a foreword by Swanee Hunt.) Perseus Book Publishing, New York, 1997; ISBN 0306456206. Paperback edition: Perseus Book Group; New York, 2000; ISBN 0738203548.
- Yes to Life: In Spite of Everything. Beacon Press, Boston, 2020. ISBN 978-0807005552.

== See also ==
- List of logotherapy institutes, many named after Frankl
